= Sly and the Family Stone discography =

Cataloging of published recordings by Sly and the Family Stone

- Studio albums: 10
- Live albums: 3
- Compilation albums: 7
- Singles: 19

This is the discography of the American band Sly and the Family Stone and the work of Sly Stone (Sylvester Stewart) outside of his band. The group had three number one singles on the Billboard Hot 100: "Everyday People" in 1968, "Thank You (Falettinme Be Mice Elf Agin)" in 1969 and "Family Affair" in 1971. Three of the band's albums were certified platinum by the Recording Industry Association of America (RIAA) and two were certified gold.

== Albums ==
=== Studio albums ===
Title	Album details	Peak chart positions						Certifications
Title	Album details	US	US R&B HH	AUS	CAN	JPN	UK	Certifications
A Whole New Thing	Released: October 1967; Label: Epic	—	—	—	—	195	—	
Dance to the Music	Released: April 1968; Label: Epic	142	11	—	—	155	—	
Life	Released: September 1968; Label: Epic	195	—	—	—	163	—	
Stand!	Released: May 1969; Label: Epic	13	3	9	11	66	—	RIAA: Platinum
There's a Riot Goin' On	Released: November 1971; Label: Epic	1	1	—	4	59	31	RIAA: Platinum; BPI: Silver
Fresh	Released: June 1973; Label: Epic	7	1	—	17	84	—	RIAA: Gold
Small Talk	Released: July 1974; Label: Epic	15	—	—	13	200	—	RIAA: Gold
Heard Ya Missed Me, Well I'm Back	Released: December 1976; Label: Epic	—	33	—	—	—	—	
Back on the Right Track	Released: November 1979; Label: Warner Bros.	152	31	—	—	—	—	
Ain't but the One Way	Released: 1982; Label: Warner Bros.	—	—	—	—	—	—	
"—" denotes releases that did not chart or were not released in that territory.

=== Solo career ===
Year	Album	Peak chart positions			Certifications (sales threshold)
Year	Album	US	US R&B	CAN	Certifications (sales threshold)
1975	High on You	45	11	98	
2011	I'm Back! Family & Friends	—	—	—	

=== Live albums ===
Title	Album details	Peak chart positions					Certifications
Title	Album details	US	US R&B	BEL (WA)	JPN	NL	Certifications
Live at the Fillmore East October 4th & 5th 1968	Released: 2015; Label: Epic/Legacy	—	24	129	114	71	
Woodstock: Sunday August 17, 1969	Released: March 2019; Label: Epic/Legacy	— (Note: Woodstock: Sunday August 17, 1969 did not enter the Billboard 200, but it peaked at number 79 on the Billboard Album Sales chart.)	—	—	—	—	
The First Family: Live at Winchester Cathedral 1967	Released: April 2025; High Moon Records	—	—	—	—	—	
"—" denotes releases that did not chart or were not released in that territory.

=== Charted compilation albums ===
Title	Album details	Peak chart positions				Certifications
Title	Album details	US	US R&B HH	CAN	JPN	Certifications
Greatest Hits	Released: October 1970; Label: Epic	2	1	10	164	RIAA: 5× Platinum
Ten Years Too Soon	Released: 1979; Label: Epic	—	62	—	—	
Different Strokes by Different Folks	Released: July 2005; Label: Epic/Hear	—	55	—	61	
The Collection	Released: 2007; Label: Epic/Legacy	—	62	—	—	
Higher!	Released: 2013; Label: Epic/Legacy	—	47	—	—	
Higher! (Highlights)	Released: 2013; Label: Epic/Legacy	—	72	—	—	
Stone Soul - The Origins Of Sly And The Family Stone	Released: 2023; Label: Regrooved	—	—	—	—	
"—" denotes releases that did not chart or were not released in that territory.

=== Solo compilations and other releases ===
- 1994: Precious Stone – Sly Stone in the Studio 1963-1965
- 2010: Listen to the Voices – Sly Stone in the Studio 1965-1970
- 2014: I'm Just Like You: Sly's Stone Flower 1969-70 – Light in the Attic

== Singles ==
=== Sly and the Family Stone ===
Title	Year	Peak chart positions							Certifications	Album
Title	Year	US	US R&B HH	BEL (FL)	BEL (WA)	GER	NL	UK	Certifications	Album
"Underdog"	1967	—	—	—	—	—	—	—		A Whole New Thing
"Dance to the Music"	1967	8	9	—	49	—	—	7	RIAA: Gold	Dance to the Music
"Life"	1968	93	—	—	—	—	—	—		Life
"Everyday People"	1968	1	1	—	—	—	—	36	RIAA: 2× Platinum; BPI: Silver	Stand!
"Stand!"	1969	22	14	—	—	—	—	—		Stand!
"Hot Fun in the Summertime"	1969	2	3	—	—	—	—	—	RIAA: Gold	Greatest Hits
"Thank You (Falettinme Be Mice Elf Agin)" / "Everybody Is a Star" (Note: "Thank You (Falettinme Be Mice Elf Again)" and "Everybody Is a Star" were marketed as a double A-side.)	1969	1	1	—	—	—	—	—	RIAA: Platinum (Note: Only "Thank You (Falettinme Be Mice Elf Agin)" was certified platinum.)	Greatest Hits
"I Want to Take You Higher"	1970	38	24	—	—	—	—	—		Stand!
"Family Affair"	1971	1	1	24	41	33	18	15	RIAA: Platinum	There's a Riot Goin' On
"Runnin' Away"	1972	23	15	—	—	—	—	17		There's a Riot Goin' On
"(You Caught Me) Smilin'"	1972	42	21	—	—	—	—	—		There's a Riot Goin' On
"If You Want Me to Stay"	1973	12	3	—	—	—	—	—	RIAA: Platinum	Fresh
"Frisky"	1973	79	28	—	—	—	—	—		Fresh
"Time for Livin'"	1974	32	10	—	—	—	—	—		Small Talk
"Loose Booty"	1974	84	22	—	—	—	—	—		Small Talk
"Family Again"	1976	—	85	—	—	—	—	—		Heard Ya Missed Me, Well I'm Back
"Remember Who You Are"	1979	105	38	—	—	—	—	—		Back on the Right Track
"The Same Thing (Makes You Laugh, Makes You Cry)"	1979	—	—	—	—	—	—	—		Back on the Right Track
"High Y'all"	1983	—	—	—	—	—	—	—		Ain't but the One Way
"—" denotes releases that did not chart or were not released in that territory.

=== Solo career ===
Title	Release info	Year	US Hot 100	US R&B	Notes
"A Long Time Alone" / "I'm Just a Fool"^{1}	Luke Record Co. AR-1008	1961	—	—	as Danny "Sly" Stewart
"Help Me With My Broken Heart" / "Long Time Alone"²	G&P 901	1962	—	—	as Sylvester Stewart
"I Just Learned How to Swim" / "Scat Swim"³	Autumn Record No. 3	1964	—	—	as Sly Stewart
"Buttermilk, Part 1" / "Buttermilk, Part 2"^{4}	Autumn Record No. 14	1965	—	—	as Sly
"Temptation Walk, Part 1" / "Temptation Walk, Part 2"^{4}	Autumn Record No. 26	1965	—	—	as Sly
"Rock Dirge, Part 1" / "Rock Dirge, Part 2"^{5}	Woodcock Records WOO-0001	1971	—	—	demos from Recorded in San Francisco
"I Get High on You" / "That's Lovin' You"	Epic 8–50135	1975	52	3	from High on You
"Le Lo Li" / "Who Do You Love?"	Epic 8-50175	1975	—	75	from High on You
"Crossword Puzzle" / "Greed"	Epic 8-50201	1976	—	—	from High on You
"Dance to the Music" / "Sing a Simple Song"	Epic 9-50795	1979	—	—	remixes from Ten Years Two Soon
"Eek-ah-Bo-Static Automatic"	A&M AM-2890	1986	—	—	backed with "Black Girls" by Rae Dawn Chong
"Love and Affection" (with Martha Davis)	A&M SP-17438	1986	—	—	12" single promo, backed with "Evolution" by Models
"Santa Claus Is Coming To Town (2023 Mix)"	Cleopatra Records	2023	—	—	Released single

== Other charted songs ==
Title	Year	Peak chart positions				Album
Title	Year	US	US R&B HH	UK	CAN	Album
"M'Lady" (B-side to "Life")	1968	93	—	32	89	Life
"Sing a Simple Song" (B-side to "Everyday People")	1968	89	28	—	91	Stand!
"If It Were Left Up to Me" (B-side to "Frisky")	1974	—	57	—	—	Fresh
"—" denotes releases that did not chart or were not released in that territory.

== Solo soundtrack contributions ==
TItle	Film	Year
"Eek-ah-Bo-Static Automatic" and "Love and Affection"	Soul Man	1986
"I'm a Burglar"	Burglar	1987

== Solo session work ==
=== Stone Flower Productions ===
Sly Stone wrote, produced, and performed instrumentation for each single released on his Stone Flower label:

=== Little Sister ===
For details on this group, see Little Sister (band)

- 1970: "You're the One [Part 1]" / "You're the One [Part 2]" (US #22, R&B #4)
- 1970: "Somebody's Watching You" / "Stanga" (US #32, R&B #8)

=== Joe Hicks ===
- 1969: "I'm Goin' Home" / "Home Sweet Home" (backed by Sly & the Family Stone on both sides)
- 1970: "Life and Death in G&A" [Part 1] / "Life and Death in G & A" [Part 1]

=== 6IX ===
- 1970: "I'm Just Like You" / "Dynamite"

=== Other solo collaborations ===
Year	Title	Main artist	Sly Stone's role
1966	The Wildest Organ in Town!	Billy Preston	arranger, writing
1973	Mighty Joe Hicks	Joe Hicks	writing, "Train of Thought" and "Water Water"
1974	Lost in a Dream	REO Speedwagon	guitar and piano on "You Can Fly"
1974	Let It Flow	Elvin Bishop	organ
1974	Insane Asylum	Kathi McDonald	vocals, "Insane Asylum"
1975	Oh, What a Mighty Time	New Riders of the Purple Sage	organ and piano on "Mighty Time"
1976	Wings of Love	The Temptations	writing, arrangements, and instrumentation^{1}
1976	Don't Know What the World Is Coming To	Bobby Womack	background vocals, "Don't Know What the World Is Coming To"
1978	Bonnie Pointer (1978)	Bonnie Pointer	writing, instrumentation^{1}
1979	Bonnie Pointer (1979)	Bonnie Pointer	writing, instrumentation
1981	The Electric Spanking of War Babies	Funkadelic	writing and instrumentation, "Funk Gets Stronger, Part 1" and "Funk Gets Stronger, Part 2"
1982	Godmoma Here	Godmoma	writing and instrumentation, "Be All You Can Be"
1983	Urban Dancefloor Guerillas	P-Funk All-Stars	writing, instrumentation
1983	"Chasing the Rock"	Gene Page Headlines featuring Sly Stone & Danny Pearson	guest leads
1986	Shockadelica	Jesse Johnson	guest leads on "Crazay"
1987	The Last Soul Man	Bobby Womack	guest leads, "When the Weekend Comes"
1988	Blueberry Gossip	Ta Mara and the Seen	vocals, "Everyday People"
1988	Kickin'	The Brothers Johnson	horn arrangement, "Ball of Fire"
1989	Animal	The Bar-Kays	writer and producer, "Just Like a Teeter-Totter"
1990	For All the King's Men	Maceo Parker	guest leads, "Tell the World"
1990	Heritage	Earth, Wind & Fire	guest leads, "Good Time"
1991	March of the 13CATS	13CATS	guitar, "Thank You"
1992	Go Fer Yer Funk (Clinton Family Series Volume I)	P-Funk All-Stars	contains 1981 demo version of "Who in the Funk Do You Think You Are", from Ain't But the One Way
1994	Testing Positive for the Funk (Clinton Family Series Volume IV)	P-Funk All-Stars	bass on "Superstar Madness", recorded in 1980
1995	Funkcronomicon	Axiom Funk	Co-writer, keyboards on "Tell the World" with Maceo Parker and Bootsy Collins
2008	George Clinton and His Gangsters of Love	George Clinton	vocals, "Ain't That Peculiar" and "Fever"
2008	BabyStone EP	BabyStone	vocals, "Stonetro"; backing vocals & R3 Vocoder, "Ask Me"
2014	First Ya Gotta Shake the Gate	Funkadelic	vocals, instruments, "Man in the Box"
Notes: 1. Because of tax problems, Sly Stone could not take credit on some of these works. In these cases, one of his associates, Truman Thomas, was credited with the work in Stone's place (although Stone or both Stone and Thomas worked on each listed item).

== As a member of other groups ==
=== The Stewart Four ===
Members Sylvester Stewart, Freddie Stewart, Rose Stewart, and Vaetta Stewart

- 1952: "On the Battlefield" / "Walking in Jesus' Name" (Church of God in Christ, Northern Sunday School Department)

=== The Viscaynes ===
- 1961: "Stop What You are Doing" / "I Guess I'll Be" (Tropo Records) ^{1}
- 1961: "Yellow Moon" / "Uncle Sam Needs You (My Friend)" (VPM Records) ²
- 1961: "Yellow Moon" / "Heavenly Angel" (VPM Records)
- 1976: "Oh What a Nite" / "You've Forgotten Me" (Subarro Records) ³

^{1} Tropo 101. Released as by "THE VISCAYNES AND THE RAMBLERS"

² VPM 1006. "Yellow Moon" comp.: Geo. Motola - R. Page. Record was first misprinted as The Biscaynes. This was a mistake because the band has always used the name VISCAYNES.

³ Subarro 489. A leftover George Motola production, "Oh What a Nite" (a remake of the Dells' 1956 hit), b/w "You've Forgotten Me" was credited "Sly Stone & the Biscaynes" when issued in 1976.

^{4} Sylvester Stewart / Sly Stone has nothing to do with the Stewart Brother singles released in the late 50s on the LA based Keen and Ensign labels. This was a different Sylvester Stewart.
