= Are You Ready (Sly and the Family Stone song) =

1968 song by Sly and the Family Stone

Song by Sly and the Family Stone

from the album Dance to the Music
- Released: 1968
- Recorded: 1968
- Length: 2:50
- Label: Epic
- Songwriter: Sly Stone
- Producer: Sly Stone

"Are You Ready" is a song written by Sly Stone that was first released on Sly and the Family Stone's 1968 album Dance to the Music. It also appears on several Sly and the Family Stone live and compilation albums.

== Music and lyrics ==
The music of "Are You Ready" is a variation of the music of the album's hit single "Dance to the Music". Allmusic critic Matthew Greenwald felt that the song is a precursor to the disco music of the 1970s. Greenwald noted the song's "relentless, 4/4 backbeat and overall sense of funk.">ref mame=allmusic/> The Guardian critic Angus Batey said that "2min 48sec of strident, direct, raw musical intensity, and foreshadows the sound and style [the group] would make their own at the close of the 1960." Batey credited drummer Greg Errico with "brilliantly combining uncompromising physicality with what ought to be an incompatible embrace of funk bounce and sophisticated jazz-tinged swing." Batey also praised the way the trumpet played by Cynthia Robinson and the saxophone played by Jerry Martini interact with Larry Graham’s "intuitive, deceptively complicated bass part." Batey suggests that at times Robinson and Martini sound like they are playing an incorrect note bot that this gives the song "immediacy and urgency".

The lyrics make a "positive, affirmative statement" with respect to racial acceptance. They include the line "Don't hate the black, don't hate the white / If you get bitten, just hate the bite." Stewart read that line to the audience before the group performed on the Ed Sullivan Show in December 1968.

== Reception ==
Batey rated "Are You Ready" as one of Sly and the Family Stone's 10 best songs. Greenwald suggested that it could have been a successful single if it had been released as such. Stylus critic Nick Southall described the song as "scintillating".

"Are You Ready" was included on the live album Live at the Fillmore East October 4th & 5th, 1968. It also appears on the compilation albums The Essential Sly & the Family Stone and Higher!.
