= Coming Back for More (film) =

- Directed by: Willem Alkema
- Produced by: DWARSPRODUCTIES; Edwin Konings; Arno Konings; NPS TELEVISION
- Cinematography: Willem Alkema; Marc Willighagen
- Edited by: Shoot The Rabbit: Marcel Buunk; Bart Leferink; Dwars Producties: Willem Alkema; Donatello: Marc Willighagen
- Music by: Sly Stone
- Release date: 2009
- Running time: 74 mins
- Country: Netherlands
- Language: English
- Box office

Coming Back for More is a documentary about Sly Stone, lead singer of Sly and the Family Stone. It was directed by Willem Alkema.

== Background ==
Coming Back for More, also known as Dance to the Music, is a documentary about Sly Stone, his absence from the music scene, and a quest to find out what happened to the artist. This is the first documentary Sly Stone has collaborated on since the 80s. The film features the first filmed interviews with the reclusive artist since his last TV appearance at Late Night With David Letterman: February 21, 1983.

Coming Back for More is the second documentary about Stone, Dutch director Willem Alkema had made. The film looks at the hardships endured by Stone and alleges that this problem was caused by former manager Jerry Goldstein. The film features interviews with Stone's family members and former bandmates and concludes with an interview between the filmmaker and Stone himself.

Prior to this film, Alkema had made a documentary Dance to the Music which was also about Stone. It was released in 2008. In 2010 the film won the audience award at Biografilm Festival in Bologna, Italy.The latest version is from 2015, the film was updated for release in Japan. This version features Sly's final public appearance in a tribute with fans during Love City: A Convention Celebrating Sly & the Family Stone on January 24, 2015 in Oakland.

== Story ==
Director Willem Alkema starts searching in 2002 for Sly Stone who has lived for years as a hermit and is rarely seen. In 2006, during the rehearsals for the Grammy Awards, a first meeting takes place. Alkema is accompanied by the Dutch twin biographers Arno and Edwin Konings. Sly Stone's sister Vaetta Stewart gives a series of performances in Europe where Sly performs a number of songs.

This is where the documentary Dance to the Music ends.

In Coming Back for More, the story continues. Alkema speaks to Sly in hotel rooms. Sly tells Alkema about his relationship with Jimi Hendrix, the origin of his songs, the writing process and his connections with Doris Day and Charles Manson. In the film, Sly plays new songs. According to the documentary, Sly is forced to live in a motor home because of a royalty conflict with his manager Jerry Goldstein. Thanks to Arno and Edwin Konings, Alkema is in possession of an agreement from the past, which contributes to the lawsuit that Sly is conducting against his manager.

In an interview with the San Francisco Bay View, Alkema said that this project had changed his view on the barriers between black and white as he was quite naïve in thinking they didn't exist.

=== Premiere ===
The film premiered at the Hot Springs Documentary Film Festival on Friday 16 October 2009.

== Cast ==
- Frank Arellano
- George Clinton
- Greg Errico
- Jerry Martini
- Nile Rodgers
- Sly Stone
- Cynthia Robinson
- Larry Graham
- Stephen Paley
- Clive Davis
- Pat Rizzo
- Novena Carmel
- Phunne Robinson
- Peter D. Coogan
