= Dance to the Music =

Dance to the Music may refer to:

- Dance to the Music (Sly and the Family Stone album), a 1968 album by Sly & the Family Stone
  - "Dance to the Music" (song), a 1968 hit single from said album
- Dance to the Music (Bruce Haack album), a 1972 album by Bruce Haack

== See also ==
- A Dance to the Music of Time, a twelve-volume cycle of novels by Anthony Powell
