= Remember Who You Are =

Song by Sly & The Family Stone

from the album Back on the Right Track
- A-side: "Remember Who You Are"
- B-side: "Sheer Energy"
- Released: 1979
- Length: 3:13
- Songwriter(s): Sylvester Stewart, Hamp Banks
- Producer(s): Mark Davis

Sly & The Family Stone singles chronology
"Family Again" (1976)	"Remember Who You Are" (1979)	"The Same Thing (Makes You Laugh, Makes You Cry)" (1979)

"Remember Who You Are" was a 1979 single for Sly & The Family Stone. It became a hit for them that year.

== Background ==
The song was written by Sylvester Stewart and Hamp Banks. The producer was Mark Davis. Hamp Banks was also the executive producer for the song. Banks also served as executive producer for the album.

Following Sly and The Family Stone's signing to Warner Bros. Records and the recent release of "Remember Who You Are", Sly, referred to as Sylvester Stone was pictured with Warner Bros. staff producer Mark Davis and Warner Bros. board chairman and president Mo Ostin in the 15 September issue of Record World.

== Reception ==
The record was one of the Feature Picks in the 8 September 1979 issue of Cash Box. The reviewer said that Sly had returned with a smooth, slithering mixture of bluesy funk and pop from the album, Back on the Right Track. The solid rhythm section backing a sharp horn arrangement and the jazzy guitar were also mentioned. The reviewer said that Sly growled and glided his way through the hook. This was also the first single release from the album.

"Remember Who You Are" was one of the Record World Single Picks for the week of 15 September. The reviewer said that it seemed like Sly had the funk in his blood and lungs and it came out in full force. The reviewer said that the backing vocals and the guitar were first rate, and the song should score across the boards.

In a 20 October review of the Back on the Right Track album in Cash Box, the reviewer said that "Remember Who You Are" was a Sly Classic if there ever was one.

== Airplay ==
The 22 September issue of Cash Box recorded that Sly & The Family Stone had been added to the playlist of Black radio station KDAY in Los Angeles.

It was reported by Cash Box in the 29 September issue that "Remember Who You Are" was no. 2 on the list of Most Added Singles on Black Contemporary radio. The stations that added the single were KMJQ, WENZ, WGIV, WAOK, WCIN, WYBC, KKTT, WOL, WWDM and WXEL-FM. Also that week, FM stations that added Sly & The Family Stone to their playlists were WNEW-FM in New York and KROQ-FM in Pasadena.

== Charts ==
=== Cash Box ===
For the week of 22 September 1979 "Remember Who You Are" debuted at no. 86 on the Cash Box Black Contemporary Top 100 chart. "Remember Who You Are" peaked at no. 28 on the week of 10 November. It spent a total of twelve weeks in the chart.

=== Billboard ===
"Remember Who You Are" debuted at no. 83 on the ''Billboard Hot Soul Singles chart the week of 29 September. The single reached its peak position at no. 38 on the week of 3 November 1979. It reached its peak at no. 105 on the Bubbling Under the Hot 100 chart the same week.
