= Different Strokes by Different Folks =

Remix album by Sly and the Family Stone
- Released: July 13, 2005
- Genre: Soul
- Length: 61:49
- Label: Hear Music (12-track release); Epic Records (14-track release)
- Producer: Sylvester Stewart; Jerry Goldstein, Glenn Stone, Steve Berkowitz

Alternative cover
- Starbucks 12-track version

Professional ratings
Review scores
Source	Rating
Allmusic	2.5/5 stars
PopMatters	4/10 stars

Different Strokes by Different Folks is a remix and cover album by American funk, and soul band Sly and the Family Stone.

== Description ==
Released first as a Starbucks-exclusive in 2005, this version (recognizable by its black background cover) featured 12 tracks. The extended 14-track version of the album was released in 2006 by Epic Records It included two additional tracks: "Don't Call Me Nigger, Whitey" and "Thank You Rhythm Nation 1814". Each track is a remix of a previously released Sly and the Family Stone song.

== Track listing ==
No.	Title	Guest Artists	Length
1.	"Dance to the Music"	will.i.am	4:04
2.	"Everyday People"	Maroon 5	2:46
3.	"Star"	The Roots	4:25
4.	"Runnin' Away"	Big Boi feat. Sleepy Brown & Killer Mike	4:04
5.	"Family Affair"	John Legend & Joss Stone with Van Hunt	3:42
6.	"(You Caught Me) Smilin'"	Scar, CeeLo Green, Big Boi & DJ Swiff	3:52
7.	"If You Want Me to Stay"	Devin Lima	3:32
8.	"I Get High On You"	The Wylde Bunch	3:36
9.	"Love City"	Moby	4:57
10.	"You Can Make It If You Try"	Buddy Guy & John Mayer	5:34
11.	"Sing a Simple Song"	Chuck D, D'Angelo & Isaac Hayes	6:37
12.	"I Want to Take You Higher"	Steven Tyler & Robert Randolph	5:09
13.	"Don't Call Me Nigger, Whitey"	Nappy Roots feat. Martin Luther	4:07
14.	"Thank You Rhythm Nation 1814"	Janet Jackson & DJ Reset	5:17
