= Heard Ya Missed Me, Well I'm Back =

Studio album by Sly and the Family Stone
- Released: December 18, 1976
- Recorded: 1976
- Genre: Funk
- Length: 33:30
- Label: Epic
- Producer: Sly Stone

Sly and the Family Stone chronology
High on You (1975)	Heard Ya Missed Me, Well I'm Back (1976)	Back on the Right Track (1979)

Professional ratings
Review scores
Source	Rating
AllMusic	2/5 stars
Christgau's Record Guide	B−

Heard Ya Missed Me, Well I'm Back is the eighth studio album by American funk-soul and rock band Sly and the Family Stone, released by Epic and CBS Records in 1976. This album is an effort to return the idea of the "Family Stone" band to singer/songwriter/multi-instrumentalist Sly Stone's work, after his previous album, High on You, was released without the Family Stone name. It also reflects the beginnings of change in the concept of "Sly and the Family Stone". The original Family Stone had broken up in 1975, and a new Family Stone was assembled for this album: the only holdover is stalwart Family Stone trumpet player Cynthia Robinson. Vet Stone and Elva Mouton, both formerly members of Family Stone backing band Little Sister, provide additional background vocals, and Johnny Colla, later a co-founder of Huey Lewis and the News, plays saxophone.

== Background ==
Formerly a tangible self-contained band, the Family Stone broke up in January 1975 after a disastrous booking at Radio City Music Hall. Subsequent to his 1975 solo album, Stone returned to using the name of his former band, although they were largely solo recordings.

From this point on, each "Sly & the Family Stone" album would essentially be a Sly Stone solo recording, with contributions from a varying group of collaborators. Sometimes, members of the original Family Stone would participate in the sessions, and sometimes session players and new members would work with Stone as well. For the most part, however, Stone performed a large part of the instrumentation for each song on his own using multitracking (as he had been doing for Family Stone LPs since There's a Riot Goin' On in 1971). This album, like the others, includes a combination of all three types of recordings.

Only one single was released from this LP, "Family Again" b/w "Nothing Less than Happiness", which failed to chart. Epic released Sly from his recording contract in 1977, and released a remix album Ten Years Too Soon, in 1979, which took several Sly & the Family Stone hits (among them "Dance to the Music", "Stand!" and "Everyday People") and had them reimagined as disco songs.

== Track listing ==
All songs credit Sly Stone as songwriter and producer.

=== Side A ===
1. "Heard Ya Missed Me, Well I'm Back" - 3:55
2. "What Was I Thinkin' in My Head" - 3:58
3. "Nothing Less Than Happiness" - 2:57
4. "Sexy Situation" - 2:55
5. "Blessing in Disguise" - 3:48

=== Side B ===
1. "Everything in You" - 3:14
2. "Mother Is a Hippie" - 3:01
3. "Let's Be Together" - 3:36
4. "The Thing" - 3:20
5. "Family Again" - 2:46

== Personnel ==
=== Sly & the Family Stone ===
- Sly Stone - vocals, keyboards, guitar, bass, various instruments
- Cynthia Robinson - trumpet, vocals
- Joe Baker - guitar, vocals
- Dwight Hogan - bass, vocals
- John Colla (aka Johnny Colla) - alto and soprano saxophone, vocals
- Steve Schuster - tenor saxophone, flute
- John Farey - keyboards, percussion
- Virginia Ayers - vocals, percussion
- Anthony Warren - drums
- Lady Bianca - vocals, clavinet
- Vicki Blackwell - violin

=== Assisting musicians ===
- Ed Bogas and Sly Stone - string arrangements
- Armando Peraza - timbales, congas
- Peter Frampton - guitar on "Let's Be Together"
- Sister Vet and Cousin Tiny - vocals
- Karat Faye - engineer

== Tour ==
Date	City	Country	Venue
3 November 1976	San Antonio	United States	San Antonio Convention Center
5 November 1976	Dallas	United States	Convention Center
6 November 1976	Norman	United States	University Of Oklahoma
7 November 1976	Tulsa	United States	Assemble Center
10 November 1976	Shreveport	United States	Hirsch Coliseum
12 November 1976	Nashville	United States	Civic Auditorium
14 November 1976	Baltimore	United States	Civic Auditorium
18 November 1976	Pittsburgh	United States	Civic Arena
19 November 1976	Roanoke	United States	Civic Auditorium
20 November 1976	Charlotte	United States	Charlotte Coliseum
21 November 1976	Greensboro	United States	Coliseum
24 November 1976	Birmingham	United States	Coliseum
25 November 1976	Montgomery	United States	Civic Auditorium
26 November 1976	Macon	United States	Coliseum
27 November 1976	Columbus	United States	Entertainment Centre
28 November 1976	Mobile	United States	Coliseum
1 December 1976	St. Petersburg	United States	Bay Front Centre
3 December 1976	Jacksonville	United States	Jacksonville Coliseum
4 December 1976	Hollywood	United States	Hollywood Sportatorium
5 December 1976	Lakeland	United States	Civic Auditorium
7 December 1976	Savannah	United States	Civic Auditorium
9 December 1976	Fayetteville	United States	Memorial Auditorium
10 December 1976	Hampton	United States	Hampton Roades Coliseum
11 December 1976	Columbia	United States	Carolina Coliseum
12 December 1976	Charleston	United States	Civic Auditoruim
17 December 1976	New York City	United States	Madison Square Garden
26 December 1976	Largo	United States	Community Center
27 December 1976	Philadelphia	United States	The Spectrum
30 December 1976	Atlanta	United States	The Omni
31 December 1976	Atlanta	United States	The Omni
1 January 1977	Huntsville	United States	Van Braun Coliseum
