= A Whole New Thing (Sly and the Family Stone album) =

Studio album by Sly and the Family Stone
- Released: October 1967; 1970 (re-release)
- Recorded: June–September 1967
- Genre: Psychedelic funk; psychedelic soul
- Length: 38:01
- Label: Epic
- Producer: Sly Stone

Sly and the Family Stone chronology
A Whole New Thing (1967)	Dance to the Music (1968)

Cover for 1970 reissue
- 1970 reissue cover for A Whole New Thing. Note the use of photographs similar to those on the cover of the Sly & the Family Stone Greatest Hits album, and the inclusion of Rose Stone as a member of the Family Stone. Rose Stone was not a member of the band at the time of this LP.

Professional ratings
Review scores
Source	Rating
AllMusic	3/5 stars
Austin Chronicle	3/5 stars
BBC Music	favorable
The Guardian	2/5 stars
Rolling Stone (1967)	unfavorable
Rolling Stone (2007)	2.5/5 stars
Stylus	B−
Uncut	5/5 stars

A Whole New Thing is the debut album by American funk-soul band Sly and the Family Stone, released in 1967 on Epic and CBS Records. The album was released to mixed criticism and failed to make an impact from a commercial standpoint and did not chart. CBS Records executive Clive Davis prevailed upon band leader Sly Stone to create a more commercial album; the result was the album Dance to the Music. Unlike later Sly and the Family Stone albums, A Whole New Thing was recorded live in the studio instead of being overdubbed and featured less of a pop feel than later releases such as Dance to the Music and Stand!. The lead vocals are shared between Sly Stone, Freddie Stone, and Larry Graham; Rose Stone would not join the band until they began work on Dance to the Music.

== Track listing ==
All tracks written, arranged and produced by Sly Stone for Stone Flower Productions.

=== Side one ===
1. "Underdog" – 3:59
2. "If This Room Could Talk" – 3:00
3. "Run, Run, Run" – 3:14
4. "Turn Me Loose" – 1:52
5. "Let Me Hear It from You" – 3:35
6. "Advice" – 2:22

=== Side two ===
1. "I Cannot Make It" – 3:20
2. "Trip to Your Heart" – 3:43
3. "I Hate to Love Her" – 3:30
4. "Bad Risk" – 3:04
5. "That Kind of Person" – 4:25
6. "Dog" – 3:10

=== CD bonus tracks ===
- 1995 CD reissue:
  - "What Would I Do" - 4:05
- 2007 CD limited edition reissue:
  - "Underdog" (mono B-side version) - 3:04
  - "Let Me Hear It From You" (mono B-side version) - 3:28
  - "Only One Way Out of This Mess" - 3:51
  - "What Would I Do" - 4:05
  - "You Better Help Yourself" (instrumental version) - 4:19

== Personnel ==
Sly and the Family Stone

- Sly Stone – vocals, organ, guitar, piano, celeste, harmonica, and more
- Freddie Stone – vocals, guitar
- Larry Graham – vocals, bass guitar
- Cynthia Robinson – trumpet, vocal ad-libs
- Jerry Martini – saxophone
- Greg Errico – drums
- Little Sister (Vet Stone, Mary McCreary, Elva Mouton) – background vocals
