= Dance to the Music (Sly and the Family Stone album) =

Studio album by Sly and the Family Stone
- Released: April 1968
- Recorded: 1967
- Genre: Psychedelic funk
- Length: 37:54
- Label: Epic
- Producer: Sly Stone

Sly and the Family Stone chronology
A Whole New Thing (1967)	Dance to the Music (1968)	Life (1968)

Dance to the Music is the second studio album by American funk-soul band Sly and the Family Stone, released in April 1968 on Epic and CBS Records. It contains the Top Ten hit single of the same name, which was influential in the formation and popularization of the musical subgenre of psychedelic soul and helped lay the groundwork for the development of funk music.

== Music ==
The Family Stone itself never thought very highly of Dance to the Music while they were recording it; its existence was the result of CBS executive Clive Davis' request for Sly Stone to make his sound more pop friendly. To appease his employer, Sly developed a formula for the band's recordings, which would still promote his visions of peace, brotherly love, and anti-racism while appealing to a wider audience. Most of the resulting Family Stone songs feature each lead singer in the band (Sly, Freddie Stone, Larry Graham, and newcomer Rose Stone) sharing the lead vocals by either singing them in unison or taking turns singing bars of each verse. In addition, the songs contained significant amounts of scat singing and prominent solos for each instrumentalist.

The formula not only worked in selling records, but influenced the entire music industry. When "Dance to the Music" became a Top 10 pop hit, R&B/soul producers and labels immediately began appropriating the new "psychedelic soul" sound. By the end of 1968, the Temptations had gone psychedelic, and the Impressions and Four Tops would join them within the space of two years. New acts such as the Jackson 5 and the Undisputed Truth would show heavy influence from Dance to the Music and its follow-ups, Life and Stand!. Many of the songs on this album (particularly the title track, "Are You Ready", "Ride the Rhythm", and the tracks that make up the "Dance to the Medley" that closes Side A) adhere closely to the formula, and also share chord progressions. Exceptions include "Color Me True", a more somber selection about how one fits in with society, Sly's solo number "Don't Burn Baby", and "I'll Never Fall in Love Again", a slow ballad sung by Larry Graham. Also included is the band's first Epic single, "Higher" (later reworked as "I Want to Take You Higher"), and a rerecording of their only release for Loadstone Records, "I Ain't Got Nobody".

Professional ratings
Review scores
Source	Rating
AllMusic	3/5 stars
The Austin Chronicle	3/5 stars
The Guardian	4/5 stars
Q	3/5 stars
Rolling Stone	3/5 stars
Stylus	C+
Uncut	4/5 stars
Yahoo! Music	(favorable)

== Track listing ==
All songs written by Sylvester Stewart unless noted; arranged and produced by Sly Stone for Stone Flower Productions.

=== Side one ===
1. "Dance to the Music" – 3:00
2. "Higher" – 2:49
3. "I Ain't Got Nobody (For Real)" – 4:26
4. Dance to the Medley – 12:12
  1. "Music Is Alive"
  2. "Dance In"
  3. "Music Lover"

=== Side two ===
1. "Ride the Rhythm" – 2:48
2. "Color Me True" – 3:10
3. "Are You Ready" – 2:50
4. "Don't Burn Baby" – 3:14
5. "I'll Never Fall in Love Again" – 3:25

=== CD bonus tracks ===
- 1995 CD limited edition reissue
  - "Soul Clappin'" - 2:38
- 2007 CD limited edition reissue
  - "Dance to the Music" (mono single version) - 2:57
  - "Higher" (mono single version) - 2:53
  - "Soul Clappin'" - 2:38
  - "We Love All" (previously unreleased) - 4:30
  - "I Can't Turn You Loose" (Otis Redding) (previously unreleased) - 3:33
  - "Never Do Your Woman Wrong" (previously unreleased instrumental) - 3:33
- Note: "Never Will I Fall In Love Again" is listed as "I'll Never Fall in Love Again" on this reissue, both on the sleeve and in the booklet.

== Personnel ==
Sly and the Family Stone

- Sly Stone - vocals, organ, guitar, piano, harmonica, and more
- Freddie Stone - vocals, guitar
- Larry Graham - vocals, bass guitar
- Rose Stone - vocals, piano, keyboards
- Cynthia Robinson - trumpet, vocal ad-libs
- Jerry Martini - saxophone, clarinet
- Greg Errico - drums
- Little Sister (Vet Stone, Mary McCreary, Elva Mouton) - backing vocals

Technical

- Marty Wekser - production supervision
- Brian Ross-Myring - engineer (California)
- Don Puluse - engineer (New York)
