= DJ Reset =

American DJ

DJ Reset is a Los Angeles based record producer and mashup musician, best known for his work with Beck, Jay Z, Pharrell Williams, and Janet Jackson. His work has been featured in Rolling Stone, Entertainment Weekly, People, Popular Science, The New Yorker, The New York Times, The New York Times Magazine, The Washington Post, Q Magazine, Mixmag, Billboard, Wired and The Village Voice. DJ Reset has performed guest DJ sets on 106.7 FM KROQ (Los Angeles), 89.9 FM KCRW (Los Angeles), 104.9 FM XFM (London), 102.3 FM OUI FM (Paris), and Sirius Satellite Radio. He has opened for numerous electronic and hip-hop acts including The Chemical Brothers, Fatboy Slim, The Prodigy, Ja Rule, Chingy, Fabolous and 112.

DJ Reset created an original score for an episode of the TV show Biography (A&E Networks). His music has also been featured on 90210 (CW), Made (MTV), and others.

== Selected discography ==
- Frontin' On Debra (DJ Reset Mash-Up): Beck, Jay-Z and Pharrell Williams (Interscope Records)
- Thank You Nation 1814: Sly and the Family Stone with Janet Jackson and DJ Reset (Epic Records)
- Glory Days (DJ Reset Remix): The Incredibles Remixes (Disney Records)
- Step Out On Faith (DJ Reset Remix): Michelle Weeks and Craig Mitchell (Slanted Black)
- Sympathy Dayz: Mary J. Blige with The Rolling Stones
- With a Little 1999: Paul McCartney and Prince
- Seven Nation Superman: The White Stripes with Eminem
- My Girl Hotel: The Temptations and Cassidy feat. R. Kelly
