= I'm Back! Family & Friends =

Studio album by Sly Stone
- Released: August 16, 2011
- Genre: Funk
- Length: 44:12
- Label: Cleopatra
- Producer: Sly Stone, Chris Lietz, Jürgen Engler

Sly Stone chronology
Ain't but the One Way (1982)	I'm Back! Family & Friends (2011)

Professional ratings
Aggregate scores
Source	Rating
Metacritic	37/100
Review scores
Source	Rating
AllMusic	1/5 stars
The A.V. Club	D
Entertainment Weekly	C
Rolling Stone	3/5 stars
The Washington Post	(unfavorable)

I'm Back! Family & Friends is the second and final solo album by singer-songwriter and multi-instrumentalist Sly Stone, released by Cleopatra Records in 2011. It contains remixes and covers of his old material with the Family Stone, along with three new tracks.

== Track listing ==
All tracks composed by Sly Stone; except where noted

1. "Dance to the Music" (featuring Ray Manzarek) – 3:01
2. "Everyday People" (featuring Ann Wilson) – 2:58
3. "Family Affair" – 3:19
4. "Stand!" (featuring Carmine Appice and Ernie Watts) – 3:14
5. "Thank You (Falettinme Be Mice Elf Agin)" (featuring Johnny Winter) – 4:55
6. "(I Want to Take You) Higher" (featuring Jeff Beck) – 4:44
7. "Hot Fun in the Summertime" (featuring Bootsy Collins) – 2:54
8. "Dance to the Music" (Extended Mix) – 6:39
9. "Plain Jane" – 4:24
10. "His Eye Is on the Sparrow" (Traditional; arranged by Sly Stone) – 4:18
11. "Get Away" – 3:46

Bonus mixes

1. "Dance to the Music" (Club Mix) – 4:12
2. "Family Affair" (Dubstep Mix) – 4:44
3. "Thank You (Falettinme Be Mice Elf Agin)" (Electro Club Mix) – 4:32

== Personnel ==
- Sly Stone - vocals
- Ava Cherry, Eugene Henderson - backing vocals
- Jürgen Engler - additional instruments
- Chris Lietz - additional instruments

== Critical reception ==
Although expressing disappointment that most of the tracks were remakes of previous hits, Rolling Stone praised the new elements of the album: "a brass-and-organ-driven take on the gospel standard "His Eye Is on the Sparrow" and two originals: the gutbucket funk of "Plain Jane" and "Get Away," a gorgeous soul vamp with a refrain – "Keep singin' that melody!" – that whets the appetite for a full-fledged Sly comeback."

AllMusic's Stephen Thomas Erlewine was less positive, noting of the new tracks that they were "saddled with the same awful production that hobbles the re-creations, the same sticky, tacky, desperate replication of the past that only underscores just how long ago Sly's golden years were."

The Washington Post's Allison Stewart was also unfavourable towards the release, stating that "Stone seems more like a visitor to these tracks, like somebody assembled them and he showed up sometimes. He sounds tired."
