= High on You (Sly Stone album) =

Studio album by Sly Stone
- Released: November 8, 1975
- Recorded: 1974–75
- Genre: Funk
- Length: 34:46
- Label: Epic (PE 33835)
- Producer: Sly Stone

Sly Stone chronology
Small Talk (1974)	High on You (1975)	Heard Ya Missed Me, Well I'm Back (1976)

Professional ratings
Review scores
Source	Rating
AllMusic	3.5/5 stars
Christgau's Record Guide	B−

High on You is the first solo album by singer-songwriter and multi-instrumentalist Sly Stone, released by Epic and CBS Records in 1975. The Family Stone broke up in January 1975 after a disastrous booking at the Radio City Music Hall. At this point, the band members parted company with Stone, except for trumpeter Cynthia Robinson, his brother and guitarist Freddie Stone, and backup singers Little Sister. With subsequent recordings, Stone returned to using the name of his former band, although they were largely solo recordings.

== Overview ==
Stone performed a large part of the instrumentation for each song on his own using multitracking (as he had been doing for Family Stone LPs since There's a Riot Goin' On in 1971). This album includes a combination of newly recorded solo material with a handful of songs recorded before the Family Stone's dissolution.

High on You's first single was the R&B number-three hit "I Get High on You". The LP's second single, "Le Lo Li", failed to chart within the R&B top 40, as did the third, "Crossword Puzzle". All three singles missed the U.S. Pop top 40.

Besides its standard stereo release, High on You was also released in quadraphonic sound.

== Track listing ==
All songs written by Sylvester Stewart and produced by Sly Stone, unless otherwise noted.

=== Side one ===
1. "I Get High on You" – 3:15
2. "Crossword Puzzle" – 2:57
3. "That's Lovin' You" – 2:58
4. "Who Do You Love?" – 3:42
5. "Green Eyed Monster Girl" – 3:55

=== Side two ===
1. "Organize" (Sylvester Stewart, Frederick Stewart) – 3:22
2. "Le Lo Li" – 3:20
3. "My World" – 3:26
4. "So Good to Me" – 3:24
5. "Greed" – 4:13

== Personnel ==
- Sly Stone – vocals, keyboards, guitar, bass, various instruments
- Little Sister (Dawn Silva, Tiny Melton, Vet Stewart, Rudy Love) – background vocals
- Freddie Stone – vocals, guitar
- Jerry Martini – saxophones
- Dennis Marcellino – saxophone
- Cousin Gale (Gail Muldrow) – guitar
- Bobby Vega – bass on "I Get High on You"
- Rusty Allen – bass on "Organize"
- Michael Samuels – drums on "Crossword Puzzle" and "Monster Girl"
- Jim Straussburg – drums on "I Get High on You", "Who Do You Love", "My World", "So Good to Me" and "Greed"
- Willie Wild Sparks – drums on "Le Lo Li"
- Bill Lordan – drums on "That's Lovin' You"
- Cynthia Robinson – trumpet, vocals
- "Little Moses" – organ on "I Get High On You"
- Bobby Lyles, Tricky Truman Governor (Truman Thomas) – keyboards
- Sid Page – violin
- Karat Faye – engineer

== Charts ==
=== Weekly charts ===
Chart (1975)	Peak positions
U.S. Billboard Pop Albums	45
U.S. Billboard Top Soul Albums	11
Canadian RPM Albums Chart	98
