= Back on the Right Track =

Studio album by Sly and the Family Stone
- Released: October 9, 1979
- Recorded: 1979
- Genre: Funk, soul
- Length: 26:07
- Label: Warner Bros. (BSK 3303)
- Producer: Mark Davis

Sly and the Family Stone chronology
| Heard Ya Missed Me, Well I'm Back (1976) | Back on the Right Track (1979) | Ain't But the One Way (1982) |

Back on the Right Track is the ninth studio album by American funk band Sly and the Family Stone, released by Warner Bros. Records in 1979. The album was, as its title alludes to, an overt comeback attempt for Sly Stone. However, the album and its singles, "Remember Who You Are" and "The Same Thing (Makes You Laugh, Makes You Cry)", failed to live up to expectations.

Some of the original Family Stone members, including Cynthia Robinson, Pat Rizzo, Freddie Stone, and Rose Stone, contributed to this album. Back on the Right Track was produced by Mark Davis.

== Background ==
Back on the Right Track and the following studio release, Ain't But the One Way, were combined by Rhino Records into a compilation called Who in the Funk Do You Think You Are: The Warner Bros. Recordings in 2001.

== Critical reception ==
Professional ratings
Review scores
| Source | Rating |
|---|---|
| AllMusic | 2/5 stars |
| Christgau's Record Guide | B |
| Record Mirror | 3.5/5 stars |
| Smash Hits | 2/10 |
| The Virgin Encyclopedia of R&B and Soul | 3/5 stars |

The Buffalo News called Back on the Right Track "a joyous, buoyant breakthrough album ... the music is as punchy as ever."

The album was reviewed in the October 20, 1979, issue of Cash Box. The reviewer said that Sly & the Family Stone avoided the disco trend and were sinking their teeth into some funky R&B meat on the neat comeback album. The reviewer said that "Remember Who You Are" was a Sly classic if there ever was one. Other picks for the album were "It Takes All Kinds" and "The Same Thing", which was referred to as wah-wah wacky. However, it was mentioned that the album's arrangements the more low key than efforts in the past.

It was also reviewed in the October 20 issue of Billboard. The reviewer said that the band returned with a strong outing and it was heavy on the funk. The best cuts were "The Same Thing", "Remember Who You Are", "Sheer Energy", and "Back on the Right Track".

== Track listing ==
All songs credit Sly Stone as songwriter; except "Remember Who You Are", written by Sly Stone and Hamp Banks

Side A

1. "Remember Who You Are" - 3:16
2. "Back on the Right Track" - 3:20
3. "If It's Not Addin' Up...." - 2:41
4. "The Same Thing (Makes You Laugh, Makes You Cry)" - 2:40

Side B

1. "Shine It On" - 4:51
2. "It Takes All Kinds" - 2:57
3. "Who's to Say" - 2:49
4. "Sheer Energy" - 3:33

== Personnel ==
- Sylvester Stewart - vocals, keyboards, harmonica
- Mark Davis - keyboards
- Walter Downing - keyboards
- Alvin Taylor - drums
- Keni Burke - bass
- Hamp Banks - guitar
- Joseph Baker - guitar
- Roscoe Peterson - guitar
- Ollie E. Brown - percussion
- Cynthia Robinson - trumpet
- Tom DeCourcey - trombone
- Pat Rizzo - saxophone
- Steve Madaio, Gary Herbig, Fred Smith - horns
- Rose Banks, Lisa Banks, Joe Baker, Freddie Stewart - backing vocals

Technical

- Karat Faye - engineer

== Re-releases ==
The album was released on Charley Records CPCD 8033 in 1996. In addition to the mix of the tracks being different, there is a difference in the song lengths. The song "It Takes All Kinds" has a completely different vocal from the Warner Bros. release.
