= Ain't but the One Way =

Studio album by Sly and the Family Stone
- Released: September 14, 1982
- Recorded: 1974–81
- Genre: Funk
- Length: 34:15
- Label: Warner Bros.
- Producer: Stewart Levine, Sly Stone

Sly and the Family Stone chronology
Back on the Right Track (1979)	Ain't but the One Way (1982)	I'm Back! Family & Friends (2011)

Ain't but the One Way is the tenth and final studio album by American funk band Sly and the Family Stone, released by Warner Bros. Records in September 1982. The album began its existence as a collaborative project between Sly Stone and George Clinton, a sequel to Stone's appearance on the 1981 Funkadelic album The Electric Spanking of War Babies. While working on Ain't but the One Way, Clinton and Funkadelic quarreled with and eventually left Warner Bros. Records, and Sly Stone went into self-seclusion and could not be found. Producer Stewart Levine was assigned to take control of the project, and do what he could to complete an album. Upon its 1982 release, Ain't but the One Way underperformed and marked the end of Sly Stone's tenure with Warner Bros. Records.

== Release ==
Both of Sly Stone's Warner Bros. albums, Ain't but the One Way and Back on the Right Track, along with five unissued recordings, were combined by Rhino Records into a compilation called Who in the Funk Do You Think You Are: The Warner Bros. Recordings in 2001.

== Critical reception ==
Professional ratings
Review scores
Source	Rating
AllMusic	1.5/5 stars
Rolling Stone	2.5/5 stars
The Village Voice	B

Reviewing the album in Rolling Stone, Steve Futterman judged it "Neither triumphant resurgence nor embarrassing failure". He elaborated that the album successfully recreates the funky grooves of "the classic Family Stone sound" but lacks the sociopolitical immediacy that the band had in their heyday. He concluded, "When a once politically astute pop statesman writes an ode to New Jersey called 'Hobo Ken,' you know something is wrong. But if you crave the beat, you'll find it here ..." The Village Voice critic Robert Christgau said "this may even be a little better" than Back on the Right Track, reasoning that "the aphoristic snap of the songwriting recalls better days, and the mix generates some heat." However, he questioned the significance of this progression: "[W]here in 1979 it seemed theoretically possible that Sly was on some track or other, there's no way this'll pull him through—often sounds as if he's not even there."

== Track listing ==
All songs written by Sylvester Stewart except where noted.

Side A

1. "L.O.V.I.N.U." - 4:39
2. "One Way" - 4:26
3. "Ha Ha, Hee Hee" (Pat Rizzo) - 3:53
4. "Hobo Ken" - 2:38

Side B

1. "Who in the Funk Do You Think You Are" - 4:34
2. "You Really Got Me" (Ray Davies) - 3:51
3. "Sylvester" - 0:44
4. "We Can Do It" - 3:45
5. "High, Y'all" - 5:45
