= The Viscaynes =

American doo-wop group

- Also known as: The Biscaynes; The Vi-Tones; The Viscaines
- Origin: Vallejo, California, United States
- Genres: Doo-wop
- Years active: 1961
- Labels: Tropo, VPM
- Past members: James Kozier; Frank Arellano; Maria Boldway; Charlie Gebhardt; Vern Gebhardt; Charlene Imhoff; Mike Stevens; Sylvester Stewart

The Viscaynes were an American doo-wop group from Vallejo, California, United States, that released a few singles in the early 1960s. They also had a regional hit with the song "Yellow Moon". One of their members Sylvester Stewart, later known as Sly Stone would front the multi-racial group Sly & the Family Stone. They were unique in being one of the very few integrated doo-wop groups of their time.

== Background ==
The Viscaynes was a high school group that Sylvester Stewart joined around 1961 when he was 17. The make up of the group consisted of two white females, two white males, a Filipino male (Frank Arellano ) and Stewart. According to Rickey Vincent's book, Party Music: The Inside Story of the Black Panthers' Band and How Black Power Transformed Soul Music, they were the only integrated doo-wop vocal act around. There was a romance going on in the group between Stewart and one of the girl singers, believed to be Maria Boldway.

=== Group formation and naming ===
The history given by the Rockportraits website is, in late 1959, a group called The Webs which Stewart formed at the age of 16 had merged with The Viscounts. The Viscounts, like The Webs, were a Vallejo High School vocal group. At this time the line up consisted of Frank Arellano, Charlene Imhoff, Sylvester Stewart, Maria "Ri" Boldway and Charles and Vern Gebhardt who were brothers. Also at this time the group was still known as The Viscounts. Due to another group already known as The Viscounts who had a hit with "Harlem Nocturne", and possible confusion with that band, they changed their name to The Viscaynes. The idea for their name came from the Chevrolet car model Biscayne. The B was removed and replaced with V because V is for Vallejo which is where they came from. By 1961 the line up consisted of Frank Arellano, Charlene Imhoff, Sylvester Stewart, Ria Boldway, Charlie Gebhardt and new member Mike Stevens possibly having replaced Vern Gebhardt.

== Career and recordings ==
In July 1961, the group had the single "Stop What You Are Doing" bw "I'll Guess I'll Be" released on the Tropo label. The A side was credited to The Viscaynes and The Ramblers. The B side was credited to The Viscaynes and The Continentals. This single which featured Stewart on harmony was also released on the Arteen label with the group credited as The Vi-Tones. The next single they released was a dual Stewart composition. "Yellow Moon" bw "Heavenly Angel" was released on the VPM label in 1961. However, the credited composers were George Motola and his wife Rickie Page. The record was a Motola-Lucas production. One of the saxophone players who played on the "Yellow Moon" recording was future Sly & The Family Stone member Jerry Martini. The record managed to sell well on the West Coast, and became a regional hit in October 1961. Also in 1961, the group provided the backing vocals for Jasper Woods (real name Richard Berry) on his single "Hully Gully Papa" / "I'm Coming Home", released on VPM 1009. The record which was written by Woods was produced by Vic Lucas and George Motola.

The amount of exposure "Yellow Moon" got on the radio got the attention of Tom Donahue, the co-founder of Autumn Records. As a result of that Sylvester Stewart was signed to the label as a producer / songwriter. Around the time the group's music was being heard on the radio they had disbanded.

In 1963, a couple of their songs found their way on to an album, Jumpin! With Pop Hits Of Tomorrow (Sutton SSU 321), released on Bob Blythe's "rack jobber serviced" budget record label, Sutton Records. The name for the group was incorrectly spelled as The Viscaines. Other artists on the album were Diane Coley, Sims Sisters, The Sparkplugs, and Dal Cory. It appears that some of the recordings that the Viscaynes backed Stewart on, credited to Sylvester Stewart / Danny Stewart / Sly Stewart may also appear on an earlier Sutton release. It was a Jimmy Witherspoon album, Stormy Monday And Other Blues (Sutton SSU 316), featuring Baby Moses, Mel Williams, and Sly Williams. The album has two songs "Help Me" and "Oh, What A Night" which are very similar to those recorded by Stewart and The Viscaynes. The two Viscaynes-backed Stewart recordings were "Help Me With My Broken Heart" and "Oh What A Night".

The Biscaynes that appear on the Tony Hilder produced compilation, Surf's Up with "Church Key" are a different group. This group which consisted of Bill Dodd, Jim Dodd, Frankie Echaveria, Augie Losada, and Jim Warren was from San Luis Obispo.

== Later years ==
In 1963, Maria Boldway was a runner up in the Miss California beauty pageant as Miss Solano County. During a very large parade, having come from Locust Street, the convertible she was in was overheating, so she put on her shoes and simply walked across Pacific Avenue to a substitute convertible that was waiting. Then she carried on, much to the delight of the onlookers.

In later years Vern Gebhardt graduated from the University of the Pacific in Stockton; he had received a football scholarship. He started work at the East Union High School in Manteca where he was a coach and teacher. He later received awards which included National Mentor Teacher of the Year and District Teacher of the Year. He would eventually become the President of the San Joaquin County School Board.

Frank Arellano is featured in two documentaries about Sly Stone. One is the Willem Alkema directed Coming Back For More, released in 2009. The other is Michael Rubenstone's On the Sly: In Search of the Family Stone. Charlene Imhoff (Davidson) died on December 18, 2023.

== Members ==
- Frank Arellano
- Maria Boldway
- Charlie Gebhardt
- Vern Gebhardt
- Charlene Imhoff
- Mike Stevens
- Sylvester Stewart

== Discography ==
Singles
Title	Release info	Year	Notes
"Stop What You Are Doing" / "I'll Guess I'll Be"	Tropo 101	1961	As The Viscaynes
"Stop What You Are Doing" / "I'll Guess I'll Be"	Tropo 101	1961	Side 1 as The Viscaynes and the Ramblers; Side 2 as The Viscaynes and The Continentals
"Stop What You Are Doing" / "I'll Guess I'll Be"	Arteen 1007	1961	As The Vi-Tones
"Yellow Moon" / "Heavenly Angel"	VPM 1006	1961	
"Uncle Sam Needs You (My Friend)" / "Yellow Moon"	VPM 1006	1961	As The Biscaynes and the Continental Band
"Oh What A Nite" / You've Forgotten Me"	Subarro 489	1976	As Sly Stone and Biscaynes

Singles (Viscaynes backing)
Artist	Title	Release info	Year	Notes
Danny Stewart	"A Long Time Alone" / "I'm Just A Fool"	Luke 1008	1961	Real name Sylvester Stewart
Sylvester Stewart	"A Long Time Alone" / "Help Me With My Broken Heart"	G&P 901	1961	
Jasper Woods	"I'm Coming Home" / "Hully Gully Papa"	VMP 1009	1962	Jasper Woods real name Richard Berry

Viscaynes album releases
Artist	Title	Release info	Year	Notes
The Viscaynes	The Viscaynes & Friends	Org Music ORG-2111	2019	LP USA release
Sly & Viscaynes	Yellow Moon The Complete Recordings 1961-1962	Regrooved RG-002	2021	2 LP Released in the Netherlands
Sly & Viscaynes	Yellow Moon The Complete Recordings 1961-1962	Ace MSIG 1442	2021	CD Japan release

VA compilations
Title	Release info	Year	F	Track	Notes
Jumpin! With Pop Hits Of Tomorrow	Sutton SSU 321	1963	LP	"You're My Only Love" "Heavenly Angels"	Diane Coley, The Viscaines; Sims Sisters, The Sparkplugs, Dal Cory
Dynamite Doo Wopps Vol 4	Dynamite Doo Wopps D-1104	1979?	LP	"Stop What You're Doing"	
Doo Wop Fast & Slow Vol. 1	Club Records DWFSLP001	1986	LP	"Stop What You're Doing"	
Group Harmony Bombshells Volume 4	Wing Ding GHB 1004	1996	CD	"Stop What You're Doing"	
Dynamite Group Sounds Vol. 28	Dynamite 128	2001	CD	"Stop What You Are Doing"	
Yesterdays Rarities Vol. 2	City Sounds CS 108		CD	"Stop What You Are Doing" "I Guess I'll Be"	
Soul City Los Angeles: West Coast Gems from the Dawn of Soul Music	Fantastic Voyage FVDD 192	2014	CD	"Heavenly Angel", "Yellow Moon" "Uncle Sam Needs You"	LP version FVDV 192
