= Rustee Allen =

American musician (born 1951)

- Born: March 3, 1951 (age 75); Monroe, Louisiana, US
- Genres: Rock, soul, funk, R&B, jazz fusion
- Occupation: Bass guitarist
- Instrument: Bass guitar
- Years active: 1969–present
- Formerly of: Sly and the Family Stone
- Website: rusteeallen.com

Rustee Allen (born March 3, 1951) is an American musician best known as the bass guitar player for the influential funk band Sly and the Family Stone from 1972 to 1975. Allen replaced founding Family Stone member Larry Graham, who was forced out of the band and went on to start his own, Graham Central Station.

== Biography ==
Born in Monroe, Louisiana, and raised in Oakland, California, Allen began teaching himself to play the guitar at age twelve. He later joined a local band, and was assigned to play the bass parts on the bottom four strings of his guitar. Penciling in a mustache on his face to obscure his being underage, he was soon playing in bars with blues guitarist Johnny Talbot. A stint with the Edwin Hawkins Singers led him to meet Freddie Stone, brother of Sly Stone and the guitarist in Sly and the Family Stone. Freddie hired Allen to play bass for Little Sister, a Family Stone offshoot group.

Larry Graham, the bass player for the Family Stone, was quoted as saying that if he ever left the group, he wanted Allen to replace him. In 1972, Allen got his chance, and assumed the role of bass player in the Family Stone after Graham was forced out of the band. Allen's recorded work with the Family Stone includes tracks from two LPs, Fresh (1973) and Small Talk (1974), along with the track "Organize" from High on You (1975). When the Family Stone dissolved in early 1975, Allen joined Robin Trower's hard blues-rock band, where he played on two albums, 1977's In City Dreams and 1978's Caravan to Midnight.

Allen has also played bass with a number of other artists, including George Clinton, Lenny Williams, The Temptations, and Lighthouse for the Blind. He led his own group, the jazz fusion band Second Wind, from 1977 to 1978. Since 1994, Allen has played bass for Bobby Womack. In 2006, Allen performed with Sly & the Family Stone at the 48th Grammy Awards. Allen is working on a solo CD entitled Simple Rules. It was issued on his own label, Rustee Nailz, on July 15, 2018. Rustee had his solo debut at the Uptown NightClub, in Oakland, CA, on July 15, 2018.

== Later years ==
Allen appeared in the documentary On the Sly: In Search of the Family Stone which was released in January 2017.
