= Vet Stone =

American soul singer (born 1950)

- Also known as: Vet Stewart
- Born: Vaetta Stewart; May 2, 1950 (age 76); Vallejo, California U.S.
- Occupation: Musician
- Instruments: Vocals, keyboard
- Years active: 1960s to present
- Formerly of: The Heavenly Tones, Sly & the Family Stone, Little Sister

Vet Stone (born Vaetta Stewart; May 2, 1950, Vallejo, California) is an American soul singer. She is the sister of Sly Stone, Rose Stone, and Freddie Stone. She was also a member of Little Sister.

== Background ==
Vaetta Stewart was born to parents K.C. and Alpha Stewart.

According to the book, Woodstock FAQ: All That's Left to Know About the Fabled Garden by Thomas E. Harkins, she was born in Denton Texas, the youngest of the Stewart children, Loretta, Sylvester, Frederick and Rose. But as the book reads, the family moved to San Francisco in the 1940s. As she was born in 1950, her birthplace would be in California.

At the age of seventeen she suffered a serious illness which could have stopped her musical direction, but she quickly recovered.

She was the lead singer in the funk group Little Sister, which had a #8 R&B hit of its own in 1970 entitled "You're the One". She also sang background for Sly & the Family Stone.

== Career ==
=== 1960s to 1980s ===
In 1966, the group she was a member of, The Heavenly Tones recorded an album, I Love the Lord which was released on Gospel MG 3050. The group's lineup also included Tramaine Hawkins. Sly Stone got the group to tour with him but Hawkins declined as she wanted to finish school. The group then became Little Sister, which was made up of Vaetta Stewart, Mary McCreary, and Elva Mouton.

In 1970, Sly & the Family Stone were in England and played at the Isle of Wight Festival. Vet went on tour with the band as sister Rose didn't participate in the tour.

Vet played keyboards and contributed backing vocals to the Small Talk album that was released in 1974. At that time the band was made up of Sly Stone, Freddie Stone, Rose Stone Banks, herself, Rusty Allen, Jerry Martini, Pat Rizzo, Cynthia Robinson, Bill Lordan and Sid Page.

Along with Dawn Silva and Tiny Melton, she contributed backing vocals to Sly Stone's solo album, High on You.

Both Vaetta (Vet) and Tiny Moulton contributed backing vocals to the 1977 album, Heard Ya Missed Me, Well I'm Back by Sly & the Family Stone.

=== 1990s to 2000s ===
As of 2005, she was a member of the band, Phunk Phamily Affair.

In 2007, Vet and the group Phunk Family Affair performed at the Lovebox in London. Sly Stone appeared with them after about half an hour to perform some of his songs. She was then the lead figure in a band called Family Stone (formerly Phunk Phamily Affair). The band includes Rose Stone and her daughter Lisa Stone among its members. Also in January that year, following Vet's efforts in persuasion, Sly performed for the first time in twenty years at the House of Blues in Anaheim, California.

In 2014, recordings she did with Little Sister were released on the I’m Just Like You: Sly’s Stone Flower 1969-1970 album, released on Light in the Attic Records.

In 2015, her book Blood is Thicker than the Mud was released. According to Blues Blast magazine, it chronicles her efforts to lead her brother, Sly Stone, back to performing live.

In 2019, she was interviewed by Ace Alan and Jay Stone for the Aced Out podcast, talking about her time with The Heavenly Tones, Sly & the Family Stone and her book.

== Film and television ==
- Small Talk About Sly, Under the Radar Films (c 2015/2016)
