= Sid Page =

American violinist (born 1947)

- Born: 1947 (age 78–79)
- Genres: Jazz; classical; pop; rock; blues; country; western swing
- Occupations: Musician; songwriter; concertmaster
- Instruments: Violin, Mandolin
- Formerly of: Dan Hicks and His Hot Licks, Sly & the Family Stone, The Point
- Website: web.archive.org/web/20090820223216/http://www.sidpageviolin.com/

Sid Page is an American violinist who has been active in many genres of music since the late 1960s.

== Background ==
He has been a member of Dan Hicks and His Hot Licks. From 1973 to 1974, he was a member of Sly and the Family Stone and appeared on their album Small Talk (1974).

Page has worked with Suzy Bogguss, Danny Elfman, Richard Elliot, Jerry Garcia, Mark Isham, James Newton Howard, Thomas Newman, Roy Orbison, Sam Phillips, Rod Stewart, John Tesh, Richard Thompson, and Suzanne Vega.

== Career ==
Page was working as a shoe salesman when he first came into contact with Dan Hicks at the El Rancho, a Santa Rosa Bar. At the time Page was in a small bebop ensemble. Hicks hired Page in 1969. He was told by his footwear employers that he could have his job back if things didn't work out. Things did work out and along the way Page grew his hair long and grew a beard.

Dan Hicks & his Hot Licks played at The Boarding House in San Francisco. The songs they covered were, Where's the Money?", "The Buzzard Was Their Friend", "Traffic Jam", "Shorty Falls in Love", "News from Up the Street", "He Don't Care He's stoned", "I Scare Myself", "Soda Fountain Baby", and "How Can I Miss You When You Won't Go Away? The performing ensemble included Jaime Leopold on bass, John Girton on lead guitar, Dan Hicks on rhythm guitar, Maryann Price on vocals and Naomi Eisenberg on violin. Page played both violin and mandolin during the performance.

By 1974, Page was a new member of Sly & the Family Stone. Drummer Bill Lordan had also joined, replacing Andy Newmark. Page's violin was a prominent feature on the album. Jeremy Shatan of Rock and Roll Globe writes that the addition Page to Sly & the Family Stone was wise and his violin adds some new swoops and swirls to the mix of "Say You Will", of which the sonics showed Sly at the top of his game.

The group appeared on Soul Train. On "Thank You (Falettinme Be Mice Elf Agin)", Page played his violin through a wah-wah pedal.

It was 1974 that Page and Lordan left Sly & the Family Stone. Page was replaced by Vicki Blackwell and Lordan was replaced by Jim Strassburg. However Page's violin playing can be heard on Sly Stone's High on You album that was released in 1975. An article about the album by Jive Time Records says, "“That’s Lovin’ You” creeps in with some excellent orchestral soul that’s lifted by Sid Page’s violin and a robust horn section."

In 1974, Page and bassist James Hutchinson formed a Latin jazz fusion group called The Point. The relocated to Austin, Texas in 1975. There they played at a club that went by the name of the Armadillo World Club Headquarters. There they were the house band for a while. Acts that they opened for included Jeff Beck, Jan Hammer, Weather Report, Charlie Daniels Band and Willie Nelson. In 1977 they won the Jazz Group of the Year at the Austin Music Awards.

Page played violin on the 1980 Love Uprising album by Tavares.

== Film work ==
Page has contributed to the music of

Abandon 2002 Paramount

at least 29 films including The Moderns in 1988, Little Man Tate in 1991, and Cold Creek Manor in 2003. He has also been concertmaster of at least eight films, including Passed Away in 1992, Son in Law in 1993, and Duma in 2005.
