= Sly Stone =

American musician (1943–2025)

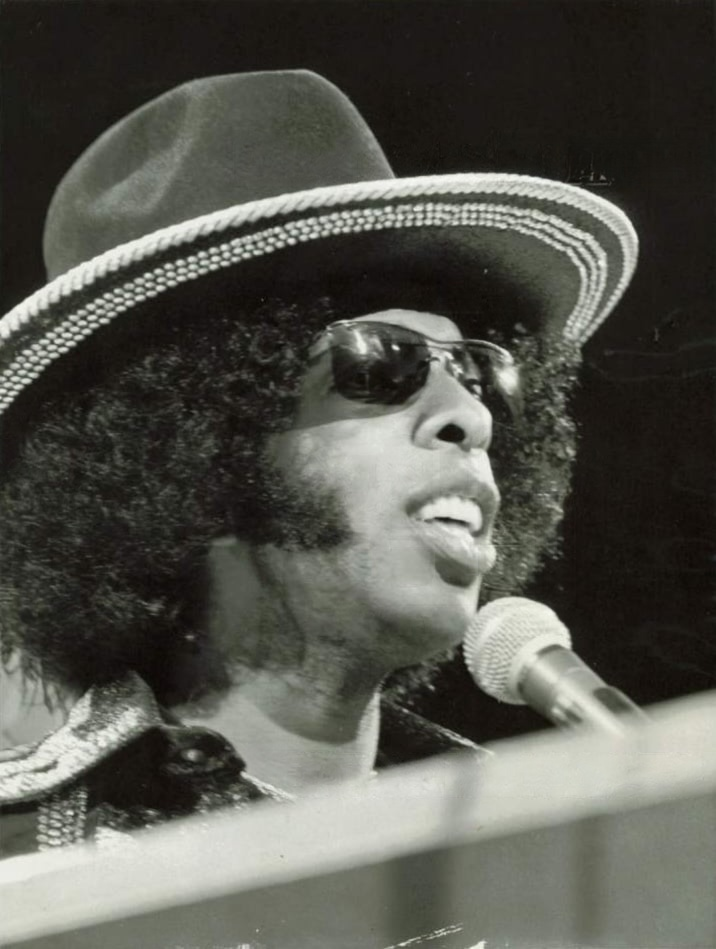
- Stone performing in 1973

Background information
- Born: Sylvester Stewart; March 15, 1943; Denton, Texas, U.S.
- Died: June 9, 2025 (aged 82) Granada Hills, Los Angeles, California, U.S.
- Genres: Funk; soul; psychedelic soul; progressive soul; funk rock; avant-funk
- Occupations: Singer; songwriter; musician; band leader; record producer
- Instruments: Vocals; keyboards; guitar; bass guitar; drums; harmonica
- Works: Solo; with the Family Stone
- Years active: 1956–2023
- Labels: Warner Bros.; Cleopatra; Epic
- Formerly of: Sly and the Family Stone; The Viscaynes
- Website: slystonemusic.com

Sylvester Stewart (March 15, 1943 – June 9, 2025), better known by his stage name Sly Stone, was an American musician, songwriter and record producer. He was the frontman of Sly and the Family Stone, playing a critical role in the development of psychedelic soul and funk with his pioneering fusion of soul, rock, psychedelia, and gospel in the 1960s and 1970s. AllMusic stated that "James Brown may have invented funk, but Sly Stone perfected it," and credited him with "creating a series of euphoric yet politically charged records that proved a massive influence on artists of all musical and cultural backgrounds". Crawdaddy! has credited him as the founder of the "progressive soul" movement.

Born in Denton, Texas, and raised in the Bay Area city of Vallejo in Northern California, Stone mastered several instruments at an early age and performed gospel music as a child with his siblings (and future bandmates) Freddie and Rose. In the mid-1960s, he worked as both a record producer for Autumn Records and a disc jockey for San Francisco radio station KDIA. In 1966, Stone and his brother Freddie joined their bands together to form Sly and the Family Stone, a racially integrated, mixed-gender act. The group would score hits including "Dance to the Music" (1968), "Everyday People" (1968), "Thank You (Falettinme Be Mice Elf Agin)" (1969), "I Want to Take You Higher" (1969), "Family Affair" (1971), and "If You Want Me to Stay" (1973) and acclaimed albums including Stand! (1969), There's a Riot Goin' On (1971), and Fresh (1973).

By the mid-1970s, Stone's drug use and erratic behavior effectively ended the group, leaving him to record several unsuccessful solo albums. He toured or collaborated with artists such as Parliament-Funkadelic, Bobby Womack, and Jesse Johnson. In 1993, he was inducted into the Rock and Roll Hall of Fame as a member of the group. He took part in a Sly and the Family Stone tribute at the 2006 Grammy Awards, his first live performance since 1987. In 2017, Stone was awarded the Grammy Lifetime Achievement Award. Stone was selected for induction into the National Rhythm and Blues Hall of Fame in September 2025.

Stone released his autobiography, Thank You (Falettinme Be Mice Elf Agin), in 2023.

== Early life and education ==
Sylvester Stewart was born in Denton, Texas, on March 15, 1943. Stewart was raised in Texas, before the family moved to Vallejo, California in 1950, in the North Bay of the San Francisco Bay Area. He was the second of five children born to K.C. and Alpha Stewart, a deeply religious couple. As part of the doctrines of the Church of God in Christ (COGIC), to which the Stewart family belonged, the parents encouraged musical expression in their middle-class household. Sylvester and his brother Freddie, along with their sisters Rose and Loretta, formed "the Stewart Four" as children, performing gospel music in church. They recorded and locally released a 78 rpm single, "On the Battlefield" b/w "Walking in Jesus' Name", in August 1956. Only their eldest sister Loretta did not pursue a musical career; the others, including youngest sister Vaetta or "Vet", would later adopt the surname "Stone" and pursue musical interests.

Sylvester was identified as a musical prodigy. By the time he was seven, he had already become proficient on the keyboards, and by the age of eleven, he had mastered the guitar, bass, and drums as well. While still in high school, Sylvester had settled primarily on the guitar and joined a number of high school bands. One of these was the Viscaynes, a doo-wop group in which Sylvester and his friend Frank Arellano—who was Filipino—were the only non-white members. During the same period, Sylvester also recorded a few solo singles under the name Danny Stewart. With his brother, Fred, he formed several short-lived groups, like the Stewart Bros. After high school Stone studied music at the Vallejo campus of Solano Community College. Early on, a fifth-grade classmate misspelled his name "Slyvester," and the nickname had followed him ever after.

== Career ==
=== As a disc jockey ===
In the mid-1960s, Stone worked as a disc jockey for San Francisco, California, soul radio station KSOL, where he included white performers such as The Beatles and The Rolling Stones on his playlists. During the same period, he worked as a staff record producer for Autumn Records, producing for predominantly white San Francisco-area bands such as The Beau Brummels, The Mojo Men, Bobby Freeman, and Grace Slick's first band, The Great Society.

Stone was influential in guiding KSOL-AM into soul music and started calling the station K-SOUL. The second station where he deejayed was a popular soul music station (sans the K-SOUL moniker), at 107.7 FM (now known as KSAN). While still providing "music for your mind, body, and your soul" on KSOL, Sly Stone played keyboard for numerous major performers including Dionne Warwick, Righteous Brothers, Marvin Gaye, and many more, including at least one of the three Twist Party concerts by then chart topper Chubby Checker held at the Cow Palace in San Francisco in 1962 and 1963.

In 1966, Sly was performing with his band Sly and the Stoners which included Cynthia Robinson on trumpet. His brother Freddie was working with his band called Freddie and the Stone Souls with Greg Errico and Jerry Martini. After also adding Larry Graham as a bassist, they fused the bands together. Working around the Bay Area in 1967, this multiracial band made a strong impression.

=== Sly and the Family Stone's success ===
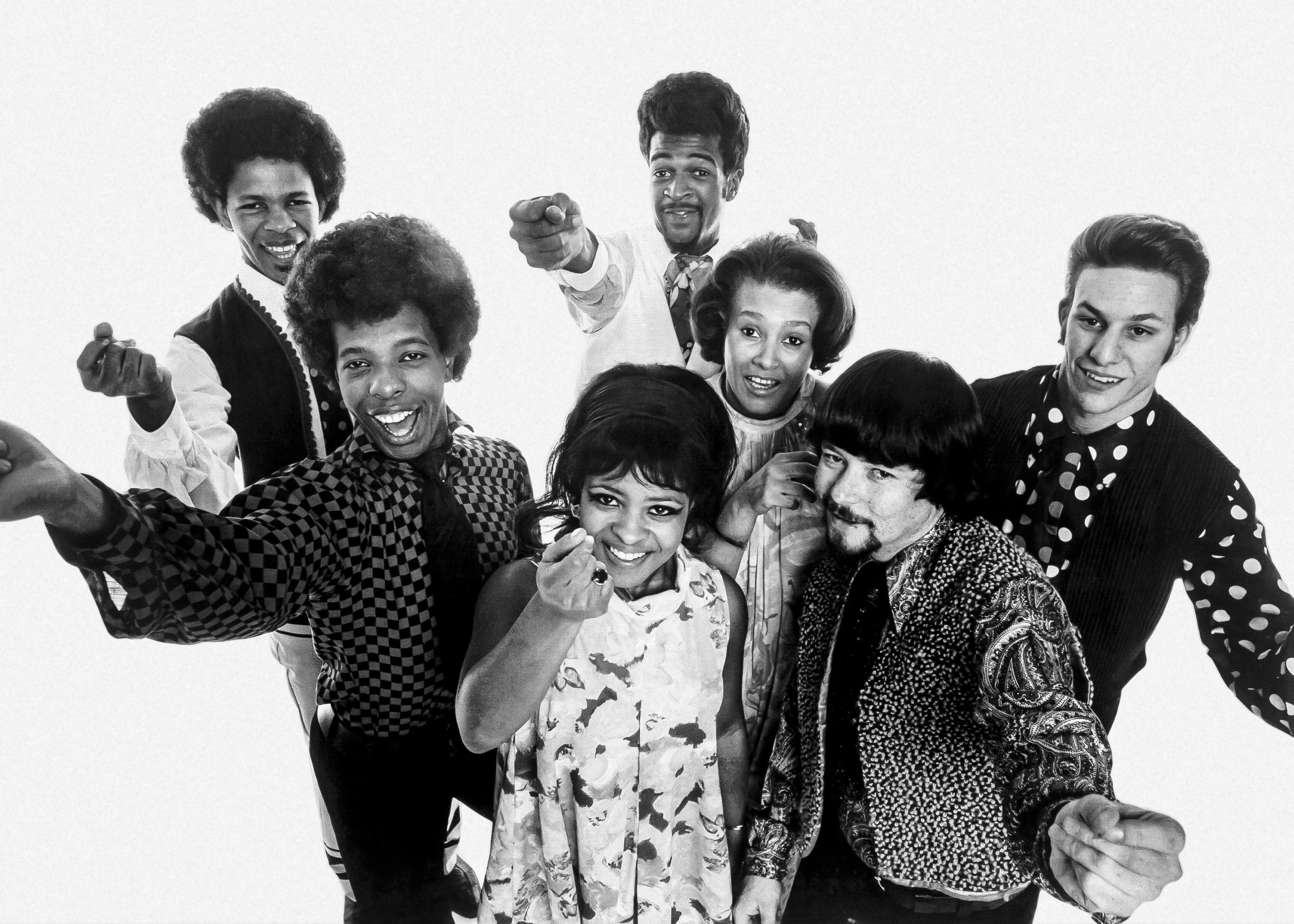
Sly and the Family Stone in 1968. Sly Stone pictured second from left.

After a mildly received debut album, A Whole New Thing (1967), Sly and the Family Stone had their first hit single with "Dance to the Music", which was later included on their second album of the same name (1968). Although their third album, Life (also 1968), also suffered from low sales, their fourth album, Stand! (1969), became a runaway success, selling over three million copies and spawning a number one hit single, "Everyday People". By the summer of 1969, Sly and the Family Stone were one of the biggest names in music, releasing two more top five singles, "Hot Fun in the Summertime" and "Thank You (Falettinme Be Mice Elf Agin)"/"Everybody Is a Star", before the end of the year and appearing at Woodstock. During the summer of 1969, Sly and the Family Stone also performed at the Summer of Soul concerts in Harlem and received an enthusiastic response from the large crowd.

After the group began touring following the success of Dance to the Music, The Family Stone drew praise for their explosive live show, which attracted black and white fans in equal measure. When Bob Marley first played in the U.S. in 1973 with his band The Wailers, he opened on tour for Sly and The Family Stone.

Along with David Kapralik who brought Sly and the Family Stone to Epic records, Stone co-formed Stone Flower Productions, a company that was jointly owned by both of them. Kapralik played multiple roles in Sly's career, serving as a producer and advisor. Sly was occasionally seen wearing a Star of David necklace, which some sources have interpreted as a personal nod to Kapralik. The label that had material produced by the company, Stone Flower Records, had their records distributed by Atlantic Records.

=== Personal problems ===
With the band's newfound fame and success came numerous problems. Relationships within the band were deteriorating; there was friction in particular between the Stone brothers and Larry Graham. Epic requested more marketable output. Jewish-American manager David Kapralik claimed that the Black Panther Party urged Stone to replace him with a black manager.

After moving to the Los Angeles area in fall 1969, Stone and his bandmates became heavy users of illegal drugs, primarily cocaine and PCP. As the members became increasingly focused on drug use and partying (Stone carried a violin case filled with illegal drugs wherever he went), recording slowed significantly. Between summer 1969 and fall 1971, the band released only one single, "Thank You (Falettinme Be Mice Elf Agin)"/"Everybody Is a Star", in December 1969. This song was one of the first recordings to employ the heavy, funky beats that would be featured in the funk music of the following decade. It showcased bass player Larry Graham's innovative percussive playing technique of bass "slapping". Graham later said that he developed this technique in an earlier band in order to compensate for that band's lack of a drummer.

"Thank You (Falettinme Be Mice Elf Agin)" hit No. 1 on the Billboard Hot 100 the week of February 14, 1970, and stayed there for two weeks. The single also peaked at No. 5 on the R&B chart, selling over a million copies.

Having relocated to Los Angeles with his girlfriend Deborah King, later Deborah Santana (wife of Carlos Santana from 1973 until filing for divorce in 2007), Stone's behavior became increasingly erratic. After a year since Stand! was released, the Greatest Hits album was released that November. One year later, the band's fifth album, There's a Riot Goin' On, was released. Riot featured a much darker sound, and most tracks were recorded with overdubbing as opposed to the Family Stone all playing at the same time as they had done previously. Stone played most of the parts himself and performed more of the lead vocals than usual. This was one of the first major label albums to feature a drum machine.

The band's cohesion slowly began to erode, and its sales and popularity began to decline as well. Errico withdrew from the group in 1971 and was eventually replaced with Andy Newmark. Larry Graham and Stone were no longer on friendly terms, and Graham was fired in early 1972 and replaced with Rustee Allen. He was also part of the band's later released albums, Fresh (1973) and Small Talk (1974), but still dealt with drug use and decline in popularity.

Live bookings for Sly and the Family Stone had steadily dropped since 1970, because promoters were afraid that Stone or one of the band members might miss the gig, refuse to play, or pass out from drug use. These issues were regular occurrences for the band during the 1970s, and had an adverse effect on their ability to demand money for live bookings. In 1970, 26 of 80 concerts were cancelled, and numerous others started late. At many of these gigs, concertgoers rioted if the band failed to show up, or if Stone walked out before finishing his set. Ken Roberts became the group's promoter, and later their general manager, when no other representatives would work with the band because of their erratic gig attendance record. In January 1975, the band booked itself at Radio City Music Hall in New York. The famed music hall was only one-eighth occupied, and Stone and company had to scrape together money to return home. Following the Radio City engagement, the band was dissolved.

Rose Stone was pulled out of the band by Hamp "Bubba" Banks, who was by then her husband. She began a solo career, recording a Motown-style album under the name Rose Banks in 1976. Freddie Stone joined Larry Graham's group, Graham Central Station, for a time; after collaborating with his brother one last time in 1979 for Back on the Right Track. He then retired from the music industry and eventually became the pastor of the Evangelist Temple Fellowship Center in Vallejo, California. Background vocalist trio Little Sister was also dissolved; Mary McCreary married Leon Russell and released recordings on Russell's Shelter Records label. Andy Newmark became a successful session drummer, playing with John Lennon, Roxy Music, B. B. King, Steve Winwood, and others.

=== Later years ===
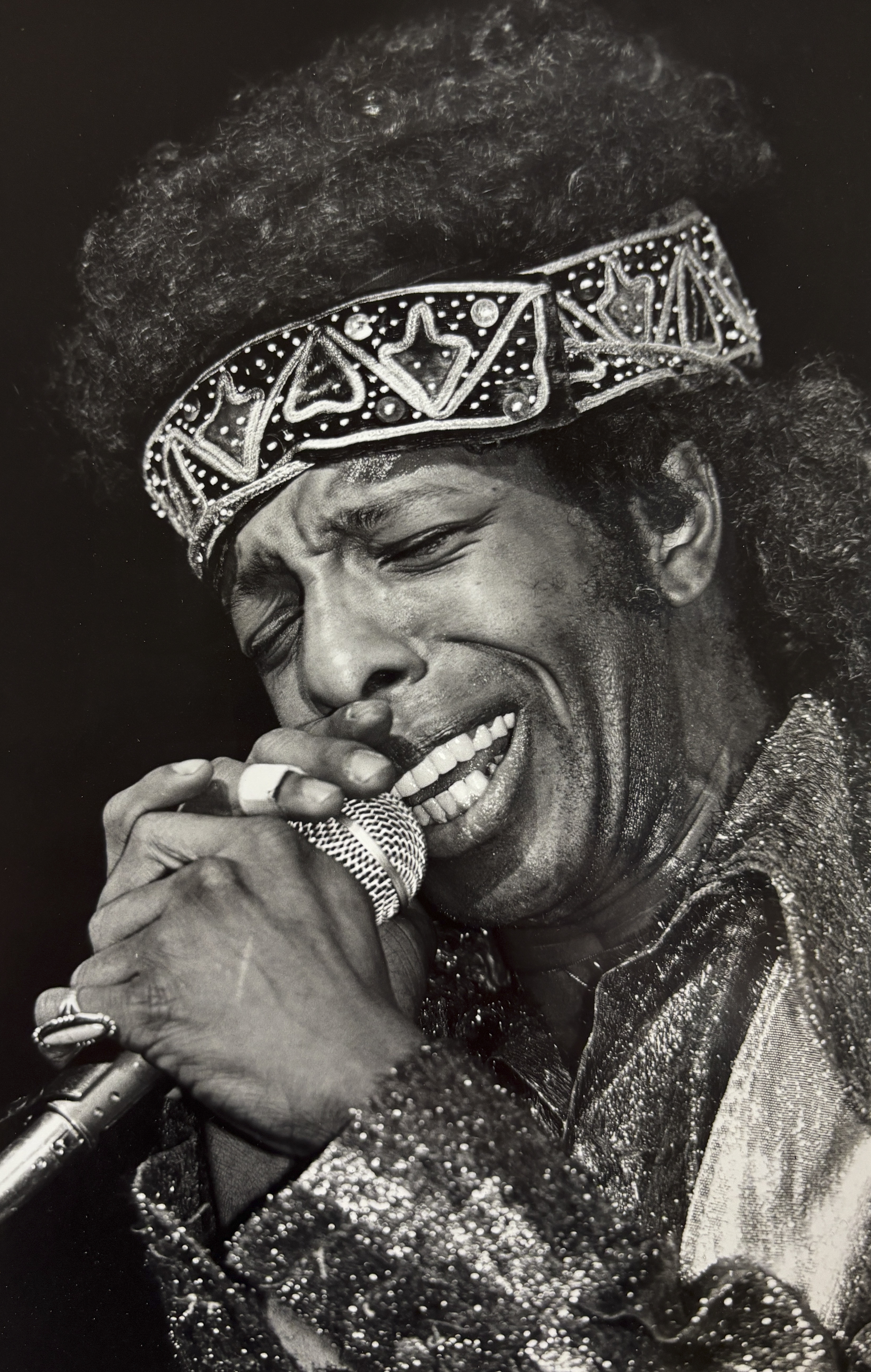
Stone performing at the Keystone Berkeley in 1982

Stone went on to record four more albums as a solo artist (only High on You (1975) was released under just his name; the other three were released under the "Sly & The Family Stone" name). In 1976, Stone assembled a new Family Stone and released Heard Ya Missed Me, Well I'm Back. 1979's Back on the Right Track followed, and in 1982 Ain't But the One Way was released, which began as a collaborative album with George Clinton, but was scrapped and later completed by producer Stewart Levine for release. None of these later albums achieved much success.

Stone also collaborated with Funkadelic on The Electric Spanking of War Babies (1981), but was unable to reinvigorate his career. In the early 1980s Sly Stone was also part of a George Clinton/Funkadelic family project with Muruga Booker called "The Soda Jerks".

In June 1983, Stone was arrested and charged with cocaine possession in Fort Myers, Florida. He served 3 years probation, and was then jailed again for violating parole.

Stone managed to do a short tour with Bobby Womack in the summer of 1984. and in 1986, Stone was featured on a track and its music video from Jesse Johnson's album Shockadelica called "Crazay".

In 1986, Stone released the single "Eek-ah-Bo-Static Automatic" and sang a duet version of "Love and Affection" with Martha Davis of The Motels for the Soul Man soundtrack. The following year, he contributed the song "I'm the Burglar" to the Burglar soundtrack. He also co-wrote and co-produced "Just Like A Teeter-Totter", which appeared on a Bar-Kays album from 1989.

In 1990, he gave an energetic vocal performance on the Earth, Wind & Fire song "Good Time". Stone also shared lead vocals with Bobby Womack on "When the Weekend Comes" from Womack's 1993 album I Still Love You. In 1992, Sly and the Family Stone appeared on the Red Hot Organization's dance compilation album, Red Hot + Dance, contributing an original track, "Thank You (Falettinme Be Mice Elf Agin) (Todds CD Mix)." The album attempted to raise awareness and money in support of the AIDS epidemic, and all proceeds were donated to AIDS charities.

In 1995, ex-landlord Chase Mellon III accused Stone of trashing the Beverly Hills mansion Mellon rented to him in 1993. Mellon says that he found bathrooms smeared with gold paint, marble floors blackened, windows broken and a gaunt Stone emerging from a guest house to say, "You’re spying on me." Sly Jr., then studying to be a recording engineer, told People, "Nobody purposely destroyed the house. I’d thrown parties. My dad had a few get-togethers. We weren't aware of the damage." The damage, however, was not just superficial. "Sly never grew out of drugs," says ex-wife Silva. "He lost his backbone and destroyed his future."

His last major public appearance until 2006 was during the 1993 Rock and Roll Hall of Fame induction ceremony where Stone showed up onstage to be entered into the Hall of Fame along with the Family Stone. His son, Sylvester Stewart Jr., told People Magazine in 1996 that his father had composed an album's worth of material, including a tribute to Miles Davis called "Miles and Miles."

On August 15, 2005, Stone drove his younger sister Vet Stone on his motorcycle to Los Angeles' Knitting Factory, where Vet was performing with her Sly and the Family Stone tribute band, the Phunk Phamily Affair. Stone kept his helmet on during the entire performance, and a film crew, conducting a documentary on Sly and the Family Stone later released as On the Sly: In Search of the Family Stone, was at the show and captured this rare sighting on film.

In 2009, the documentary film Coming Back for More detailed his dire financial situation. On August 18, 2009, The Guardian reported that the forthcoming documentary, Coming Back for More by Dutch director Willem Alkema, claims Stone was homeless and living off welfare while staying in cheap hotels and a camper van. The film alleges that Stone's former manager, Jerry Goldstein, cut off his access to royalty payments following a dispute over a 'debt agreement', forcing Stone to depend on welfare payments. On September 25, 2011, Alkema wrote in the New York Post that Sly Stone was homeless and living out of a white camper-van in Los Angeles: "The van is parked on a residential street in Crenshaw, the rough Los Angeles neighborhood where Boyz n the Hood was set. A retired couple makes sure he eats once a day, and Stone showers at their house."

Stone had filed suit against Goldstein for $50 million in January 2010, accusing Goldstein of cheating him out of years' worth of royalty payments for the songs he had written. He testified that he had not been paid any royalties between 1989 and 2009. The litigation further claimed that Goldstein had used fraudulent practices to convince him to give up the rights to his songs, and made the same claim about the Sly and the Family Stone trademark. Goldstein filed a countersuit for slander following a rant by Stone at the Coachella Festival. In January 2015, a Los Angeles jury ruled in favor of Stone, awarding him $5 million. However, in December 2015, the award was overturned when an appellate court ruled that the trial judge had not told the jury to take into account the fact that Stone had assigned his royalties to a production company in exchange for a 50% ownership stake. In May 2016, Stone's attorneys appealed that decision.

=== Mid-2000s tributes ===
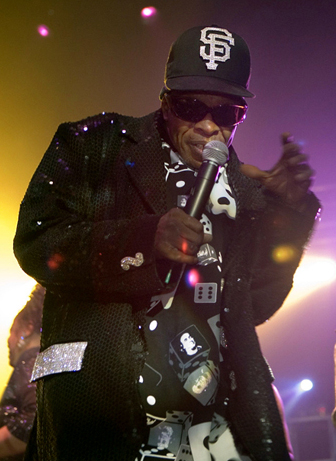
Stone in 2007

A Sly and the Family Stone tribute took place at the 2006 Grammy Awards on February 8, 2006, at which Stone gave his first live musical performance since 1987. Sly and the original Family Stone lineup (minus Larry Graham) performed briefly during a tribute to the band, for which the headliners included Steven Tyler, John Legend, Van Hunt, Nile Rodgers, and Robert Randolph. Sporting an enormous blonde mohawk, thick sunglasses, a "Sly" beltbuckle and a silver lamé suit, he joined in on the song "I Want To Take You Higher". Hunched over the keyboards, he wore a cast on his right hand (the result of a recent motorcycle accident), and a hunched back caused him to look down through most of the performance. His voice, though strong, was barely audible over the production. Stone walked to the front of the stage toward the end of the performance, sang a verse, and then, with a wave to the audience, sauntered offstage before the song was over.

A Sly and the Family Stone tribute album, Different Strokes by Different Folks, was released on July 12, 2005, by Starbucks' Hear Music label, and on February 7, 2006, by Epic Records. The project features both cover versions of the band's songs and songs which sample the original recordings. Among the artists on the record are The Roots ("Star", which samples "Everybody is a Star"), Maroon 5 and Ciara ("Everyday People"), John Legend, Joss Stone and Van Hunt ("Family Affair"), The Black Eyed Peas' will.i.am ("Dance to the Music"), and Steven Tyler, Joe Perry, and Robert Randolph ("I Want to Take You Higher"). Epic Records' version of the tribute album, which included two additional covers ("Don't Call Me Nigger, Whitey" and "Thank You (Falletinme Be Mice Elf Agin)") was released in January 2006.

=== Re-emergence ===
On Sunday, January 14, 2007, Stone made a short guest appearance at a show of The New Family Stone band he supported at the House of Blues. On April 1, 2007, Stone appeared with the Family Stone at the Flamingo Las Vegas Showroom, after George Wallace's standup act.

On July 7, 2007, Stone made a short appearance with the Family Stone at the San Jose Summerfest. He sang "Sing a Simple Song" and "If You Want Me to Stay", and walked off stage before the end of "Higher". Stone cut the set short, in part, because the band began their set over 90 minutes late and had to finish before a certain time. While many blamed Stone for this incident, others believed that the promoter was at fault. A similar scene took place at the Montreux Jazz Festival on July 13, 2007, where he played for only 20 minutes before exiting the stage. This was part of a European tour that Stone and the rest of the band went on in July that year.

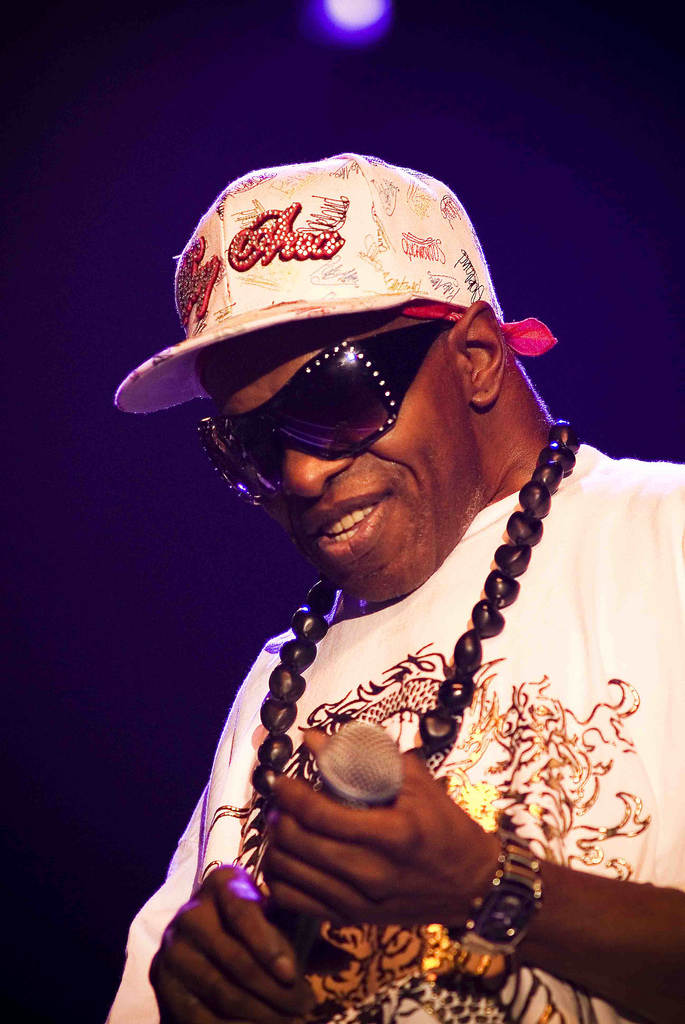
Stone in 2007

On October 17, 2008, Sly played with the Family Stone at the Wells Fargo Center for the Arts in Santa Rosa, California. He played a 22-minute set and ventured offstage, telling the crowd "I gotta go take a piss. I'll be right back." He never returned. On Memorial Day, May 25, 2009, Stone re-emerged once again, granting an hour-long interview with KCRW-FM, a Los Angeles NPR affiliate, to discuss his life and career.

On Labor Day, September 7, 2009, Stone appeared at the 20th annual African Festival of the Arts in Chicago, Illinois with George Clinton and Parliament-Funkadelic.

On December 6, 2009, Stone signed a new recording contract with the LA-based Cleopatra Records and on August 16, 2011, I'm Back! Family & Friends was released, his first album since 1982's Ain't But the One Way. The album features re-recorded versions of Sly and the Family Stone hits with guest appearances from Jeff Beck, Ray Manzarek, Bootsy Collins, Ann Wilson, Carmine Appice, and Johnny Winter, as well as three previously unreleased songs.

Stone appeared in later years with George Clinton and performed with his daughter Novena's band, Baby Stone.

In January 2015, Sly Stone, along with four of his bandmates, appeared at a convention dedicated to honoring the band and its legacy. Called LOVE CITY CONVENTION, it occurred in Oakland at the Den Lounge inside the Fox Oakland Theater. In October 2023, Stone's autobiography Thank You (Falettinme Be Mice Elf Agin) was published. In December 2023, a single titled "Santa Claus Is Coming to Town (2023 Mix)" was released by Cleopatra Records.

== Personal life ==
=== Relationships and children ===
From 1969 to 1972, Stone was in a tumultuous relationship with Deborah King (the daughter of blues musician Saunders King and later wife of Carlos Santana). After the couple relocated to Los Angeles in late 1969, their relationship became increasingly volatile and heavily involved domestic abuse and heavy drug use, including LSD and cocaine.

Stone married Kathy Silva (Kathleen Sharon Silva) on June 5, 1974, during a sold-out performance at Madison Square Garden. Their outfits were designed by Halston. They made elaborate plans for a laser-light show, a human "angel" flying on wires dropping gold glitter all over the crowd, and for thousands of doves to be released. The ASPCA threatened a lawsuit, which kept the doves from flying and the Garden wouldn't let the human "angel" fly unless Stone and company posted a $125,000 security bond. They declined to pay the fee, and also opted not to pay for the 200 extra security guards the venue demanded in order to allow the wedding party to stage a processional right through the audience. The $25,000 reception, courtesy of Columbia Records, was held at the Waldorf-Astoria's Starlight Roof.

Stone and Silva's son Sylvester Jr. was born in September 1973. Silva filed for divorce in October 1974, but the couple continued an unstable relationship until 1976, when they permanently separated after their son was mauled by Stone's dog. Silva later told People magazine. "I didn't want that world of drugs and weirdness." Still, she remembers, "He'd write me a song or promise to change, and I'd try again. We were always fighting, then getting back together."

Stone's daughter Sylvyette, who now goes by her middle name Phunne, was born in December 1975. Her mother was Stone's band member Cynthia Robinson. His second daughter, Novena Carmel, born February 1982 to Olenka Wallach (1954–2009), is a singer and performer, and also a booking agent at the Little Temple club in Los Angeles, and currently hosts Morning Becomes Eclectic for the public radio station KCRW.

=== Family ===
Moses Tyson, Jr., Stone's cousin, is a gospel musician and organist. Stone is also the first cousin of vocalist Lynn Mabry, whom he hired as a backing vocalist for the 1976 album Heard Ya Missed Me, Well I'm Back.

=== Terry Melcher ===
Stone and producer Terry Melcher spent time together at Melcher's home in the late 1960s, and on more than one occasion Stone saw Charles Manson there. According to Stone in a 2009 interview with LA Weekly's Randall Roberts, he was once at Melcher's home playing music and had a small disagreement with Manson there, though Stone did not know who Manson was at the time. Stone met Melcher's mother, Doris Day, through Melcher when Stone was interested in an old car that he thought one of them owned. When he met Day, he told her how much he liked her song "Whatever Will Be, Will Be", and they sat at the piano and sang it. After that, a rumor spread that Stone and Day were involved romantically.

=== Death ===
On June 9, 2025, Stone died at his home in Granada Hills, Los Angeles, at the age of 82. His family said in a statement provided to Rolling Stone that Stone had died of chronic obstructive pulmonary disease and "other underlying health issues". He was cremated at Hollywood Forever Cemetery in its crematory.

== Legacy ==
Along with James Brown and Parliament-Funkadelic, Sly and the Family Stone were pioneers of late 1960s and early 1970s funk. Their fusion of R&B rhythms, infectious melodies, and psychedelia created a new pop/soul/rock hybrid, the impact of which has proven lasting and widespread. Motown producer Norman Whitfield, for example, patterned the label's forays into harder-driving, socially relevant material (such as The Temptations' "Runaway Child" and "Ball of Confusion") based on their sound. The pioneering precedent of Stone's racial, sexual, and stylistic mix, had a major influence in the 1980s on artists such as Prince and Rick James. Legions of artists from the 1990s forward – including Public Enemy, Fatboy Slim, Beck, Beastie Boys, and LL Cool J's popular "Mama Said Knock You Out" along with many others – mined Stone's seminal back catalog for hook-laden samples.

=== Film and television ===
Greg Zola made a documentary about Sly Stone, Small Talk About Sly. It was begun on, or prior to 2006. It was completed prior to 2017. It has been described in Ellen Exner's book, Bach Perspectives, Volume 13 Bach Reworked, as a series of interviews about the musical background and contributions of Sly Stone. It is viewable in sections.

Michael Rubenstone's On the Sly: In Search of the Family Stone was released in 2017. In the film, Rubenstone travels across the United States in a bid to track down those who were involved with Sly Stone. The film played at the Slamdance Film Festival.

The documentary Sly Lives! (aka the Burden of Black Genius), directed by Ahmir "Questlove" Thompson, was released in 2025. It explores the challenges that black performers face, and celebrates how Stone was able to establish a healthy life after the pressures of show business and fame. Some interviews from Small Talk About Sly and Michael Rubenstone's On the Sly: In Search of the Family Stone were used in the documentary.

Before Stone died, he was working on a screenplay based on his 2024 memoir. His family commented: "Sly recently completed the screenplay for his life story, a project we are eager to share with the world in due course."

== Discography ==
- High on You (1975)
- I'm Back! Family & Friends (2011)

== Books ==
- Stone, Sly; Greenman, Ben (2023). Thank You (Falettinme Be Mice Elf Agin): A Memoir. New York: AUWA Books. ISBN 978-0-374-60698-5. OCLC 1404449224.
