= Sly and the Family Stone =

American funk and soul band (1966–1983)

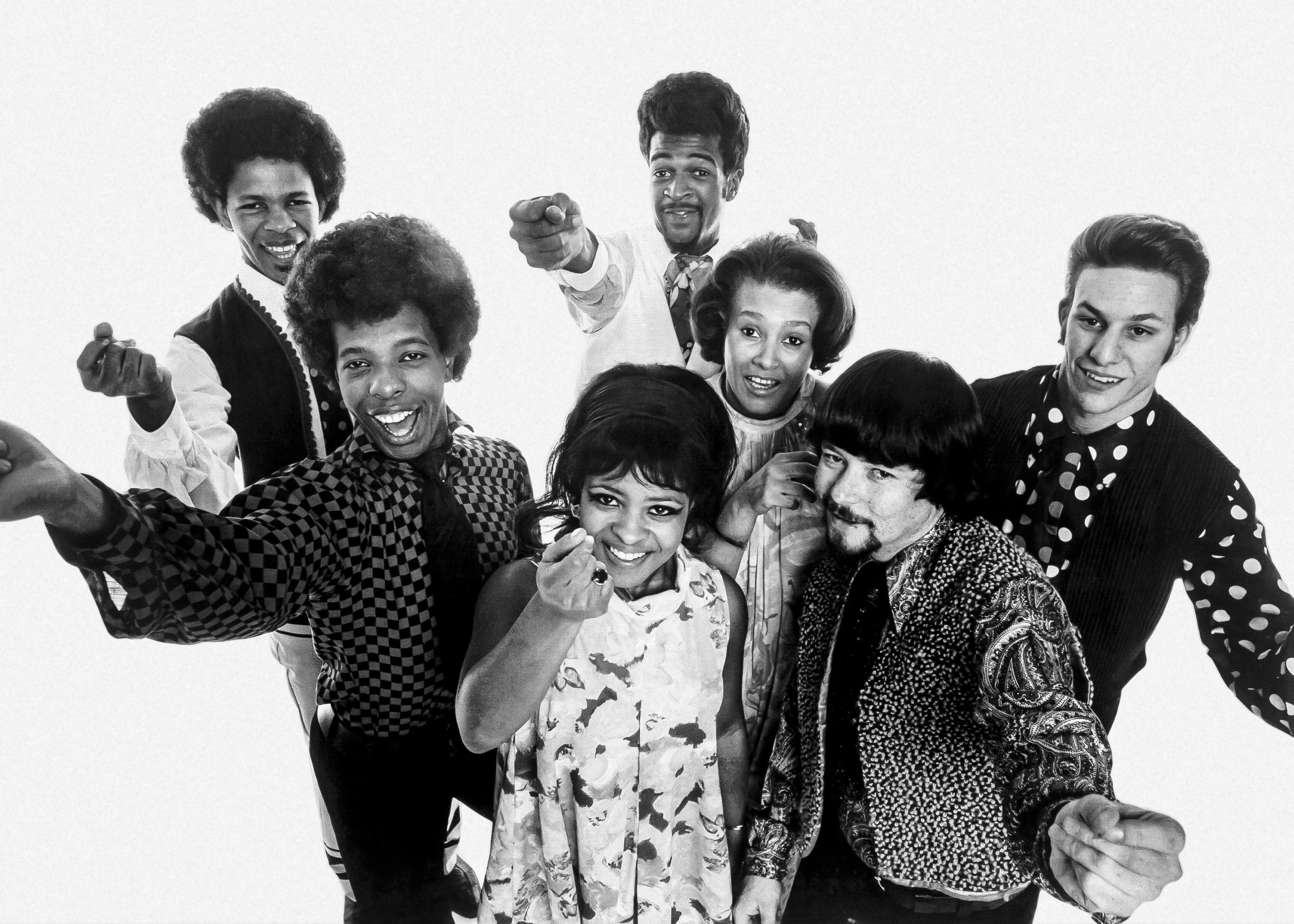
- Sly and the Family Stone in 1968. Left to right: Freddie Stone, Sly Stone, Rose Stone, Larry Graham, Cynthia Robinson, Jerry Martini, and Greg Errico.

Background information
- Origin: San Francisco, California, U.S.
- Genres: Psychedelic soul; funk; rock; progressive soul
- Works: Discography
- Years active: 1966–1983
- Labels: Epic, Stone Flower
- Spinoffs: Graham Central Station; Little Sister; The Brides of Funkenstein
- Past members: Sly Stone; Freddie Stone; Cynthia Robinson; Jerry Martini; Larry Graham; Greg Errico; Rose Stone; Vet Stewart; Mary McCreary; Elva Mouton; Gerry Gibson; Pat Rizzo; Rustee Allen; Andy Newmark; Bill Lordan; Sid Page; Vicki Blackwell; Jim Strassburg; Dennis Marcellino

Sly and the Family Stone was an American band formed in San Francisco, California, in 1966 and active until 1983. Their work, which blended elements of funk, soul, psychedelic rock, gospel, and R&B, became a pivotal influence on subsequent American popular music. Their core line-up was led by singer-songwriter, producer, and multi-instrumentalist Sly Stone, and included Stone's siblings Freddie Stone (guitar, vocals) and Rose Stone (keyboard, vocals) alongside Cynthia Robinson (trumpet, vocals), Greg Errico (drums), Jerry Martini (saxophone), and Larry Graham (bass, vocals). The band was the first major American rock group to have a racially integrated, mixed-gender lineup.

Formed in 1966, the group synthesized a variety of musical genres to pioneer the emerging "psychedelic soul" sound. They released a series of Top 10 Billboard Hot 100 hits such as "Dance to the Music" (1968), "Everyday People" (1968), “Hot Fun in the Summertime” (1969), and "Thank You (Falettinme Be Mice Elf Agin)" (1969), as well as critically acclaimed albums such as Stand! (1969), which combined pop sensibility with social commentary. In the 1970s, it transitioned into a darker and less commercial funk sound on releases such as There's a Riot Goin' On (1971) and Fresh (1973), proving as influential as their early work. By 1975, drug problems and interpersonal clashes led to dissolution, though Sly continued to record and tour with a new rotating lineup under the name "Sly and the Family Stone" until drug problems forced his effective retirement in 1987.

The work of Sly and the Family Stone influenced the sound of subsequent American funk, pop, soul, R&B, and hip-hop. Music critic Joel Selvin wrote, "there are two types of black music: black music before Sly Stone, and black music after Sly Stone". In 2010, they were ranked 43rd in Rolling Stone's 100 Greatest Artists of All Time, and three of their albums are included on the most recent version of Rolling Stone's 500 Greatest Albums of All Time. The band was inducted into the Rock and Roll Hall of Fame in 1993.

== Career ==
Sylvester Stewart was born into the Dallas, Texas, family of K.C. and Alpha Stewart, followers of the Church of God in Christ (COGIC), who encouraged musical expression in the household. After the Stewarts moved to Vallejo, California, the youngest four children (Sylvester, Freddie, Rose, and Vaetta) formed "The Stewart Four", who released a local 78 RPM single, "On the Battlefield of the Lord" b/w "Walking in Jesus' Name".

While attending high school, Sylvester and Freddie joined student bands. One of Sylvester's high school musical groups was a doo-wop act called the Viscaynes. The Viscaynes released a few local singles, and Sylvester recorded several solo singles under the name "Danny Stewart".

By 1964, Sylvester had become Sly Stone. He became a disc jockey for San Mateo, California-located R&B radio station KSOL, where he included white performers such as the Beatles and the Rolling Stones in his playlists. During the same period, he worked as a record producer for Autumn Records, producing for San Francisco-area bands such as the Beau Brummels and the Mojo Men. One of the Sylvester Stewart-produced Autumn singles, Bobby Freeman's "C'mon and Swim", was a national hit. Stewart recorded unsuccessful solo singles while at Autumn.

=== Early years ===
In 1966, Sly Stone formed a band called Sly & the Stoners, which included acquaintance Cynthia Robinson on trumpet. Around the same time, Freddie founded a band called Freddie & the Stone Souls, which included Greg Errico on drums, and Ronnie Crawford on saxophone. At the suggestion of Stone's friend, saxophonist Jerry Martini, Sly and Freddie combined their bands, creating Sly and the Family Stone in November 1966. At first the group was called Sly Brothers and Sisters but after their first gig at the Winchester Cathedral, a night club in Redwood City, California, they changed the name to Sly & the Family Stone. Since both Sly and Freddie were guitarists, Sly appointed Freddie the official guitarist for the Family Stone, and taught himself to play the electronic organ. Sly also recruited Larry Graham, Robinson's cousin, to play bass guitar.

Vaetta Stewart wanted to join the band as well. She and her friends, Mary McCreary and Elva Mouton, had a gospel group called the Heavenly Tones. Sly recruited the teenagers directly out of high school to become Little Sister, Sly and the Family Stone's background vocalists.

After a gig at the Winchester Cathedral, CBS Records executive David Kapralik signed the group to CBS's Epic Records label. The Family Stone's first album, A Whole New Thing, was released in 1967 to critical acclaim, particularly from musicians such as Mose Allison and Tony Bennett. However, the album's low sales restricted their playing venues to small clubs, and caused Clive Davis and the record label to intervene. Some musicologists believe the Abaco Dream single "Life and Death in G & A", recorded for A&M Records in 1967 and peaking at No. 74 in September 1969, was performed by Sly and the Family Stone.

Davis talked Sly into writing and recording a record, and he and the band reluctantly provided the single "Dance to the Music". Upon its November 1967 release, "Dance to the Music" became a widespread ground-breaking hit, and was the band's first charting single, reaching No. 8 on the Billboard Hot 100. Just before the release of "Dance to the Music", Rose Stone joined the group as a vocalist and a keyboardist. Rose's brothers had invited her to join the band from the beginning, but she initially had been reluctant to leave her steady job at a local record store.

The Dance to the Music album went on to decent sales, but the follow-up, Life, was not as successful commercially. In September 1968, the band embarked on its first overseas tour, to England. It was cut short after Graham was arrested for possession of marijuana and because of disagreements with concert promoters.

=== Stand! (1969) ===
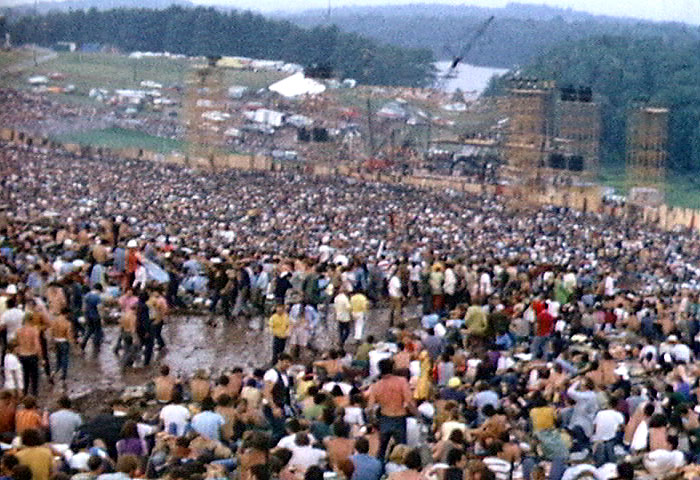
The Woodstock Music and Art Festival, at which Sly and the Family Stone performed on August 17, 1969.

In late 1968, Sly and the Family Stone released the single "Everyday People", which became their first No. 1 hit. "Everyday People" was a protest against prejudice of all kinds and popularized the catchphrase "different strokes for different folks". With its B-side "Sing a Simple Song", it served as the lead single for the band's fourth album, Stand!, which was released on May 3, 1969. The Stand! album eventually sold more than three million copies; its title track peaked at No. 22 in the U.S. Stand! is considered one of the artistic high points of the band's career. It contained the above three tracks as well as the songs "I Want to Take You Higher" (which was the B-side of the "Stand!" single), "Don't Call Me Nigger, Whitey", "Sex Machine", and "You Can Make It If You Try".

The band headlined the Harlem Cultural Festival before tens of thousands of spectators in Mount Morris Park in 1969. The concert series is the subject of a 2021 documentary film directed by Ahmir "Questlove" Thompson called Summer of Soul. The success of Stand! secured Sly and the Family Stone a performance slot at the landmark Woodstock Music and Art Festival. They performed their set during the early-morning hours of August 17, 1969; their performance was said to be one of the best shows of the festival. A new non-album single, "Hot Fun in the Summertime", was released the same month and went to No. 2 on the U.S. pop chart (peaking in October, after the summer of 1969 had already ended). In 1970, following the release of the Woodstock documentary, the single of "Stand!" and "I Want to Take You Higher" was reissued with the latter song now the A-side; it reached the Top 40.

=== Internal problems and a change of direction ===
With the band's new-found fame and success came numerous problems. Relationships within the band were deteriorating; there was friction in particular between the Stone brothers and Larry Graham. Epic requested more marketable output. Jewish-American manager David Kapralik claimed that Sly's sister Loretta, as well as the Black Panther Party, urged Sly to replace him with a black manager.

After moving to the Los Angeles area in fall 1969, Sly Stone and his fellow band members became heavy users of illegal drugs, primarily cocaine and PCP. As the members became increasingly focused on drug use and partying (Sly Stone carried a violin case filled with illegal drugs wherever he went), recording slowed significantly. Between summer 1969 and fall 1971, the band released only one single, "Thank You (Falettinme Be Mice Elf Agin)"/"Everybody Is a Star", released in December 1969. "Thank You" reached the top of the Billboard Hot 100 in February 1970.

During 1970, Sly Stone spent most of his waking hours on drugs. He became erratic and moody, and missed nearly a third of the band's concerts that year. The band did close out the Strawberry Fields Festival near Toronto, Ontario, in August, but live appearances on television talk shows such as The Mike Douglas Show and The Dick Cavett Show went unpredictably. Meanwhile, Sly hired his streetwise cohorts, Hamp "Bubba" Banks and J.B. Brown, as his personal managers; they in turn brought in gangsters such as Edward "Eddie Chin" Elliott and Mafioso J.R. Valtrano to be Sly's bodyguards. Sly enlisted these individuals to handle his business dealings, to retrieve drugs, and to protect him from those he considered his enemies, some of whom were his own bandmates and staff. A rift developed between Sly and the rest of the band; in early 1971, drummer Errico became the first to leave the band for other ventures. He was replaced with a succession of drummers until Sly settled on Gerry Gibson, who only remained with the band for a year before being replaced by Andy Newmark in 1973.

To appease fan demand for new songs, Epic began re-releasing material. A Whole New Thing was reissued with a new cover, and several of the Family Stone's most popular recordings were packaged into the band's first Greatest Hits album. Greatest Hits reached number two on the Billboard 200 in 1970.

During this period, Sly Stone negotiated a production deal with Atlantic Records, resulting in his own imprint, Stone Flower Productions. Stone Flower released four singles, including one by R&B artist Joe Hicks, one by a group called 6IX, and two pop Top 40/R&B Top 10 singles by Little Sister: "You're the One" and "Somebody's Watching You", a cover of a song from Stand!. For unclear reasons, Sly gradually withdrew his attention from Stone Flower, and the label was closed in 1971. Little Sister's "Somebody's Watching You" is the first popular recording to feature the use of a drum machine for its rhythm track.

=== There's a Riot Goin' On (1971) ===
In 1971, Sly and the Family Stone returned with a new single, "Family Affair", which became a number-one single on the Billboard Hot 100. "Family Affair" was the lead single from the band's long-awaited There's a Riot Goin' On.

Instead of the optimistic, rock-laced soul that had characterized the Family Stone's 1960s output, There's a Riot Goin' On was urban blues, filled with dark instrumentation, filtered drum machine tracks, and plaintive vocals representing the hopelessness Sly and many other people were feeling in the early 1970s. The album is characterized by a significant amount of tape hiss – the result of Sly's extensive re-recording and overdubbing during production. Allegedly, most of the album's instrumentation is performed by Sly alone, who enlisted the Family Stone for some of the additional instrumental parts and friends such as Billy Preston, Ike Turner, and Bobby Womack for others. "(You Caught Me) Smilin'" and "Runnin' Away" were also released as singles, and performed well on the charts.

After the release of Riot, additional lineup changes took place. In early 1972, reacting to Jerry Martini's probing about his share of the band's earnings, Sly hired saxophonist Pat Rizzo as a potential replacement though both ended up remaining in the band. Later that year, the tension between Sly Stone and Larry Graham reached its peak. A post-concert brawl broke out between the Graham and Sly entourages; Bubba Banks and Eddie Chin, having heard that Larry had hired a hit man to kill Sly, assaulted Graham's associates. Graham and his wife climbed out of a hotel window to escape, and Pat Rizzo gave them a ride to safety. Unable to continue working with Sly, Graham immediately quit the Family Stone and went on to start Graham Central Station, a successful band in the same vein as Sly and the Family Stone. Graham was replaced in the interim by Bobby Womack, and then by nineteen-year-old Rustee Allen.

=== Fresh (1973) and Small Talk (1974) ===
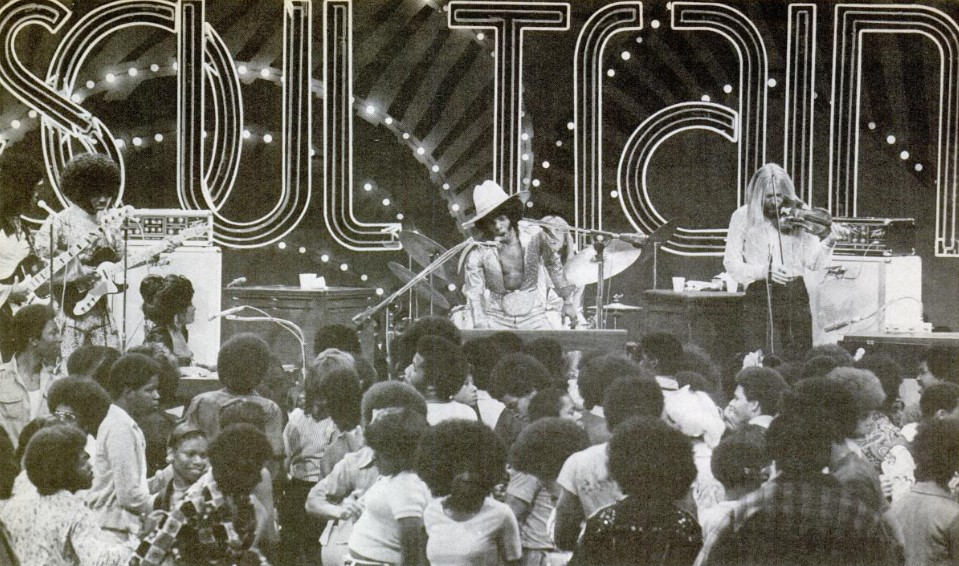
The band on Soul Train in 1974

Despite the loss of the original rhythm section and Sly's escalating cocaine use, the band's next album, Fresh, was released in 1973. By this time, Sly's sound had become more stripped down, yet more syncopated and rhythmically complex. Sly obsessively overdubbed the masters, as he had done with Riot. Although the record received mixed reviews at its release and did not attract the attention enjoyed by the band's earlier work, Fresh has become recognized as one of the most important funk albums ever made. Rose Stone sang lead on a gospel-styled cover of Doris Day's "Que Sera, Sera (Whatever Will Be, Will Be)", and the single "If You Want Me to Stay" became a Top 20 hit in the U.S. Its follow-up, Small Talk, was released in 1974 to mixed reviews and low sales. The first Small Talk single, "Time For Livin'", became the band's final Top 40 hit single. "Loose Booty", the second single, peaked at No. 84.

=== Dissolution ===
During the 1970s, Sly or another of the band members would often miss a gig, refuse to play, or pass out from drug use, impacting their live bookings. At many gigs, concert-goers rioted if the band failed to appear or if Sly walked out before finishing his set. Ken Roberts became the group's promoter, and later their general manager, when other representatives would not work with the band because of their erratic attendance. In January 1975, the band booked itself at Radio City Music Hall. The famed music hall was only one-eighth filled, and Sly and company had to scrape together money to return home. Following the Radio City engagement, the band was dissolved.

Rose Stone was pulled out of the band by Bubba Banks, who was then her husband. She began a solo career, recording a Motown-style album under the name Rose Banks in 1976. Freddie Stone joined Larry Graham's group, Graham Central Station, for a time; after collaborating with his brother one last time in 1979 for Back on the Right Track, he retired from the music industry and eventually became the pastor of the Evangelist Temple Fellowship Center in Vallejo. Little Sister was also dissolved; Mary McCreary married Leon Russell and worked with him on music projects. Andy Newmark became a successful session drummer, playing with Roxy Music, Pink Floyd, B. B. King, Steve Winwood and others.

=== Sly Stone's later career ===
Sly recorded two more albums for Epic: High on You (1975) and Heard You Missed Me, Well I'm Back (1976). High on You was billed as a Sly Stone solo album; Heard You Missed Me was a Sly and the Family Stone album in name only. Although Sly continued to collaborate with some of the original Family Stone members on occasion, the actual band no longer existed. Sly played most of the instruments on the record himself; he maintained a band to support him for live shows. Among his main collaborators were Cynthia Robinson and Pat Rizzo from the Family Stone, and background vocalists Lynn Mabry and Dawn Silva, who parted with Sly in 1977 and formed The Brides of Funkenstein in 1978. Epic released Stone from his contract in 1977, and in 1979 released 10 Years Too Soon, a remix album featuring disco versions of the 1960s Family Stone hits.

Sly signed with Warner Bros. and recorded Back on the Right Track (1979). Although the album featured contributions from Freddie and Rose Stone, Sly remained unable to return to the success of his late '60s and early '70s fame. He toured with George Clinton and Funkadelic during the late 1970s and early 1980s, and also appeared on the 1981 Funkadelic album The Electric Spanking of War Babies. That year, Clinton and Sly began work on a new Sly Stone album; however, recording halted when Clinton and Funkadelic disputed with and left Warner Bros. Records in late 1981. When Sly disappeared into seclusion, producer Stewart Levine completed the album, which was released as Ain't But the One Way in 1982. The album sold poorly and received mixed critical reception, but Sly made an appearance on Late Night With David Letterman that year. Overcome by drug addictions, Sly Stone toured the United States with various backup acts. In June 1983 in Ft. Myers, Florida, he was arrested on drug possession and entered court-ordered drug rehabilitation. Once released, Sly continued sporadically releasing new singles and collaborations until a 1987 arrest and conviction for cocaine possession and use. Afterwards, he stopped releasing music.

In 1992, Sly and the Family Stone appeared on the Red Hot Organization's dance compilation album, Red Hot + Dance, contributing an original track, "Thank You (Falettinme Be Mice Elf Agin) (Todds CD Mix)". The album attempted to raise awareness and money in support of the AIDS epidemic, and all proceeds were donated to AIDS charities.

In 2009, the documentary Coming Back for More was released. Sly tells director Willem Alkema about his conflicts with his manager Jerry Goldstein and that because of this he is forced to live in hotels.

On August 16, 2011, the album I'm Back! Family & Friends was released. The album features re-recorded versions of Sly and the Family Stone's greatest hits with guest appearances from Jeff Beck, Ray Manzarek, Bootsy Collins, Ann Wilson, Carmine Appice, and Johnny Winter, as well as three previously unreleased songs.

Sly Stone died on June 9, 2025, at the age of 82 from chronic obstructive pulmonary disease (COPD) and other underlying health conditions.

== Musical style and legacy ==
=== Early years ===
Sly Stone produced for and performed with black and white musicians during his early career, and he integrated music by white artists into black radio station KSOL's playlist as a DJ. Similarly, the Sly and the Family Stone sound was a melting pot of many influences and cultures, including James Brown funk, Motown pop, Stax soul, Broadway showtunes, and psychedelic rock music. Wah-wah guitars, distorted fuzz basslines, church-styled organ lines, and horn riffs provided the musical backdrop for the vocals of the band's four lead singers. Sly Stone, Freddie Stone, Larry Graham, and Rose Stone traded off on various bars of each verse, a style of vocal arrangement unusual and revolutionary at that time in popular music. Cynthia Robinson shouted ad-libbed vocal directions to the audience and the band; for example, urging everyone to "get on up and 'Dance to the Music'" and demanding that "all the squares go home!"

The lyrics for the band's songs were often pleas for peace, love, and understanding among people. These calls against prejudice and self-hate were underscored by the band's on-stage appearance. White musicians Gregg Errico and Jerry Martini were members of the band at a time when integrated performance bands were virtually unknown; integration had only recently become enforced by law. Female members Cynthia Robinson and Rosie Stone played instruments onstage, rather than just providing vocals or serving as visual accompaniment for the male members. The band's gospel-styled singing endeared them to black audiences; their rock music elements and wild costuming—including Sly's large Afro and tight leather outfits, Rose's blond wig, and the other members' loud psychedelic clothing—caught the attention of mainstream audiences, and helped the group enjoy success as a pop act.

Although "Dance to the Music" was the band's only hit single until late 1968, the impact of that single and the Dance to the Music and Life albums reverberated across the music industry. The smooth, piano-based "Motown sound" was out; "psychedelic soul" was in, and the band would become a leading exponent of the sound. Rock-styled guitar lines similar to the ones Freddie Stone played began appearing in the music of artists such as The Isley Brothers ("It's Your Thing") and Diana Ross & the Supremes ("Love Child"). Larry Graham invented the "slapping technique" of bass guitar playing, which became synonymous with funk music. Some musicians changed their sound completely to co-opt that of Sly and the Family Stone, most notably Motown in-house producer Norman Whitfield, who took his main act The Temptations into "psychedelic soul" territory starting with the Grammy-winning "Cloud Nine" in 1968. The early work of Sly and the Family Stone was also a significant influence on the music of Michael Jackson & The Jackson 5 and soul/hip-hop groups such as George Clinton & Parliament/Funkadelic, Arrested Development, and The Black Eyed Peas.

=== Later work ===
The later work of Sly and the Family Stone was as influential as the band's early work. There's a Riot Goin' On, Fresh, and Small Talk are considered among the first and best examples of the matured version of funk music, after prototypical instances of the sound in the band's 1960s work. A 2003 article for Rolling Stone commented; "Sly and the Family Stone created a musical utopia: an interracial group of men and women who blended funk, rock and positive vibes... Sly Stone ultimately discovered that his utopia had a ghetto, and he brilliantly tore the whole thing down on There's a Riot Goin' On, which does not refute the joy of his earlier music." In a retrospective review, Zeth Lundy of PopMatters called There's a Riot Goin' On "a challenging listen, at times rambling, incoherent, dissonant, and just plain uncomfortable" with "some episodic moments of pop greatness to be found" and viewed it as a radical departure from the band's previous work:

[It] sank their previously burgeoning idealism at a time when social disillusionment was all the rage. Sly had found something else to take him higher and, as a result, Riot is a record very much informed by drugs, paranoia, and a sort of halfhearted malcontent [...] listening to it isn't exactly a pleasurable experience. It's significant in the annals of pop and soul because it is blunt and unflinching, because it reflects personal and cultural crises in a manner unbecoming for pop records at the time. Riot can be classified as avant-soul only after being recognized as a soul nightmare—the 'nightmare', so to speak, being a reflection of an unfortunate and uncompromised reality, not a glossed-over pop-music approximation of reality.

Writer Colin Larkin described the album as "unlike anything heard before in black music". Herbie Hancock was inspired by Sly's new funk sound to move towards a more electric sound with his material, resulting in Head Hunters (1973). Miles Davis was similarly inspired by the band and worked with Sly Stone on his recordings, resulting in On the Corner; the sartorial and band lineup changes hallmarked jazz fusion. Davis was particularly impressed with material from Stone's 1973 album Fresh. British musician and ambient music pioneer Brian Eno cited Fresh as having heralded a shift in the history of recording, "where the rhythm instruments, particularly the bass drum and bass, suddenly [became] the important instruments in the mix." Artists such as Michael Jackson, Stevie Wonder, Prince, Outkast, Chuck D, the Red Hot Chili Peppers, and John Mayer have also shown significant inspiration from the post-1970 work of Sly and the Family Stone.

== Awards and tributes ==
Sly and the Family Stone were inducted into the Rock and Roll Hall of Fame in 1993. The original members of the Family Stone were in attendance, except Sly. Just as the band took the podium to receive their awards, Sly suddenly appeared. He accepted his award, made some very brief remarks ("See you soon"), and disappeared from public view. In December 2001, Sly and the Family Stone were awarded the R&B Foundation Pioneer Award. Two Family Stone songs, "Dance to the Music" and "Thank You (Falettinme Be Mice Elf Again)", are among The Rock and Roll Hall of Fame's 500 Songs that Shaped Rock and Roll. In 2004, Rolling Stone magazine ranked them 43rd on their list of the 100 Greatest Artists of All Time.

In 2003, Rolling Stone's 500 Greatest Albums of All Time list included Greatest Hits at number 60, There's a Riot Goin' On at number 99, Stand! at number 118, and Fresh at number 186. In 2004, on their 500 Greatest Songs of All Time list, Rolling Stone included "Family Affair" at number 138, "Everyday People" at number 145, "Dance to the Music" at number 223, "Stand!" at number 241, "Hot Fun in the Summertime" at number 247, and "Thank You (Falettinme Be Mice Elf Agin)" at number 402.

A Sly and the Family Stone tribute album, Different Strokes by Different Folks, was released on July 12, 2005, by Starbucks' Hear Music label. The project features cover versions of the band's songs, songs which sample the original recordings, and songs that do both. The artists included The Roots ("Star", which samples "Everybody Is a Star"), Maroon 5 ("Everyday People"), John Legend, Joss Stone & Van Hunt ("Family Affair"); the Black Eyed Peas' will.i.am ("Dance to the Music"), and Steven Tyler and Robert Randolph ("I Want to Take You Higher"). Epic Records' version of the tribute album (with two additional covers: "Don't Call Me Nigger, Whitey" and "Thank You (Faletinme Be Mice Elf Again)") was released on February 7, 2006. The version of "Family Affair" won the 2007 R&B Performance by a Duo or Group with Vocal Grammy.

The group was inducted into the Vocal Group Hall of Fame in 2007.

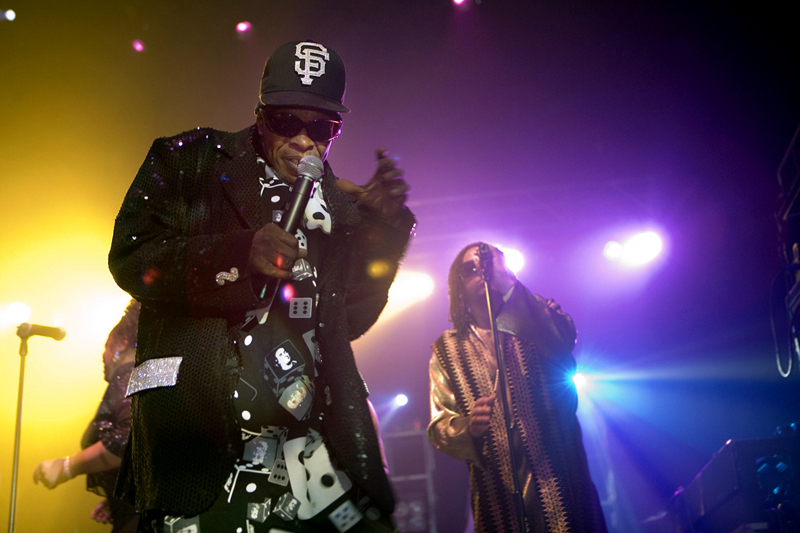
Sly Stone performing with the Family Stone in 2007.

=== 2006 Grammy Awards tribute ===
A Sly and the Family Stone tribute took place at the 2006 Grammy Awards on February 8, 2006. The original plan was to surprise the audiences by featuring a reunion performance of the original lineup as a highlight, but the organisers were concerned that Sly Stone would not appear after he was late or absent for rehearsals.

The tribute began halfway through the Grammy Awards ceremony, and was introduced by comedian Dave Chappelle. It featured Nile Rodgers, Joss Stone, Van Hunt, and John Legend performing "Family Affair"; Fantasia and Devin Lima performing "If You Want Me to Stay"; Adam Levine and Ciara performing "Everyday People"; will.i.am performing "Dance to the Music"; and Steven Tyler and Joe Perry of Aerosmith with Robert Randolph performing "I Want to Take You Higher".

After the first half of "I Want to Take You Higher", the Family Stone took the stage alongside the other musicians, and Tyler called backstage "Hey, Sly; let's do it the way we used to do it!" Sporting a blonde mohawk hairdo, sunglasses, and a silver lamé suit, Sly Stone emerged and contributed vocals and keyboards to a continuation of "I Want To Take You Higher." Three minutes into the performance, Sly tossed a wave to the audience and exited the stage, leaving the Family Stone and the guest performers to complete the number alone.

Sly's unusual appearance and brief performance garnered highly mixed reviews and was covered throughout the press. One Associated Press report referred to Sly as the "J. D. Salinger of funk" and simply referred to the performance as being "bizarre". Another AP report stated that "nineteen years after his last live performance, Sly Stone proved he's still able to steal the show." MTV News was much less complimentary: "The Grammy performance—Sly's first with the original Family Stone since 1971—was a halting, confused affair and a complete disservice to his music."

== Members ==
This listing features the lineup from 1967 to 1975. After 1975, the lineup changed with each of the last four LPs.

- Sly Stone (Sylvester Stewart) (1966–1975; died 2025): vocals, organ, guitar, bass guitar, piano, harmonica, and more
- Freddie Stone (Frederick Stewart) (1966–1975): vocals, guitar
- Cynthia Robinson (1966–1975; died 2015): trumpet, vocal ad libs
- Jerry Martini (1966–1975): saxophone
- Little Sister: Vet Stone (Vaetta Stewart), Mary McCreary, and Elva Mouton (1966–1975): background vocals
- Larry Graham (1966–1972): vocals, bass guitar
- Gregg Errico (1966–1971): drums
- Rose Stone (Rose Mary Stewart) (1967–1975): vocals, piano, electric piano
- Gerry Gibson (1971–1972): drums
- Pat Rizzo (1972–1975; died 2021): saxophone
- Rustee Allen (1972–1975): bass
- Andy Newmark (1973–1974): drums
- Bill Lordan (1974): drums
- Sid Page (1973–1974): violin
- Vicki Blackwell (1974–1975): violin
- Jim Strassburg (1974): drums
- Adam Veaner (1975): drums
- Dennis Marcellino (1975, died 2022): saxophone

== Discography ==
- A Whole New Thing (1967)
- Dance to the Music (1968)
- Life (1968)
- Stand! (1969)
- There's a Riot Goin' On (1971)
- Fresh (1973)
- Small Talk (1974)
- Heard Ya Missed Me, Well I'm Back (1976)
- Back on the Right Track (1979)
- Ain't but the One Way (1982)

== Bibliography ==
- Aronowitz, Al (November 1, 2002). "The Preacher". The Blacklisted Journal. Retrieved 2009-11-12.
- Ankeny, Jason (2005). "Sylvester 'Sly Stone' Stewart Allmusic.com. Retrieved 2005-03-29.
- Erlewine, Stephen Thomas (2005). Sly and the Family Stone. Allmusic.com. Retrieved 2005-03-29.
- Lewis, Miles Marshall (2006). There's a Riot Goin' On. 33-1/3. New York: Continuum. ISBN 0-8264-1744-2.
- Selvin, Joel (1998). For the Record: Sly and the Family Stone: An Oral History. New York: Quill Publishing. ISBN 0-380-79377-6.
- Williams, Otis and Romanowski, Patricia (1988, updated 2002). Temptations. Lanham, MD: Cooper Square. ISBN 0-8154-1218-5
