= Dance to the Music (song) =

1968 single by Sly and the Family Stone

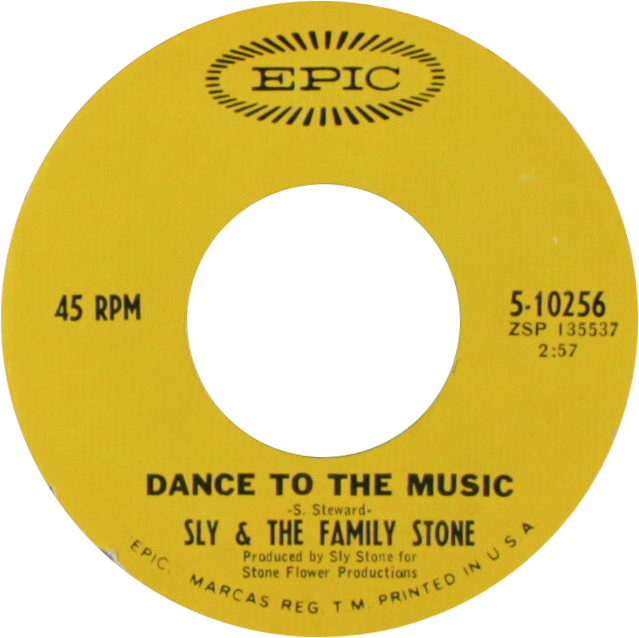
- Side A of the US single

Single by Sly and the Family Stone

from the album Dance to the Music
- B-side: "Let Me Hear It From You"
- Released: 17 November 1967
- Recorded: 1967
- Genre: Psychedelic soul; progressive soul; pop; R&B
- Length: 3:00
- Label: Epic; 5-10256; EMI Columbia; DB 8369 (March 1968 UK release); Direction; 58-3568 (June 1968 UK reissue)
- Songwriter: Sly Stone
- Producer: Sly Stone

Sly and the Family Stone singles chronology
"Higher" (1967)	"Dance to the Music" (1967)	"Life" / "M'Lady" (1968)

Music video
- "Dance to the Music" (audio) on YouTube

"Dance to the Music" is a 1967 hit single by American soul and funk band Sly and the Family Stone Released by Epic and CBS Records. It was the first single by the band to reach the Billboard Pop Singles Top 10, peaking at No. 8 and the first to popularize the band's sound, which would be emulated throughout the black music industry and dubbed "psychedelic soul". It was later ranked No. 223 on Rolling Stone's list of the 500 Greatest Songs of All Time.

"Dance to the Music" by Sly and the Family Stone was inducted into the Grammy Hall of Fame in 1998.

== History ==
"Dance to the Music"

=== Reluctance to adopt a pop sound ===
None of the band members particularly liked "Dance to the Music" when it was first recorded and released. The song, and the accompanying Dance to the Music LP, were made at the insistence of CBS Records executive Clive Davis, who wanted something more commercially viable than the band's 1967 LP, A Whole New Thing. Bandleader Sly Stone crafted a formula, blending the band's distinct psychedelic rock leanings with a more pop-friendly sound. The result was what saxophonist Jerry Martini called "glorified Motown beats. 'Dance to the Music' was such an unhip thing for us to do."

=== About the song ===
However, "Dance to the Music" did what it was supposed to do: it launched Sly and the Family Stone into the pop consciousness. Even toned down for pop audiences, the band's radical sound caught many music fans and fellow recording artists completely off guard. "Dance to the Music" featured four co-lead singers, black musicians and white musicians in the same band, and a distinct blend of instrumental sounds: rock guitar riffs from Sly's brother Freddie Stone, a funk bassline from Larry Graham, Greg Errico's syncopated drum track, Sly's gospel-styled organ playing, and Jerry Martini and Cynthia Robinson on the horns.

An unabashed party record, "Dance to the Music" opens with Robinson screaming to the audience, demanding that they "get on up...and dance to the music!" before the Stone brothers and Graham break into an a cappella scat before the song's verses begin. The actual lyrics of the song are sparse and self-referential. The song serves as a Family Stone theme song of sorts, introducing Errico, Robinson, and Martini by name. After calling on Robinson and Martini for their solo, Sly tells the audience that "Cynthia an' Jerry got a message that says...", which Robinson finishes: "All the squares go home!" The Stone Brothers and Graham repeat the a cappella portion before the refrain of the repeated title is mentioned over and over with the sound of the instruments dropping out, except for the electric guitar, being played in the upper register, before the song's fade.

The song mentions the line: "Ride, Sally, Ride", a lyric from the Wilson Pickett hit song "Mustang Sally" (1966).

=== Legacy ===
"Dance to the Music" was one of the most influential songs of the late-1960s. The Sly and the Family Stone sound became the dominating sound in African-American pop music for the next three years, and many established artists, such as The Temptations and their producer Norman Whitfield, Diana Ross & the Supremes, The Impressions, The Four Tops, The 5th Dimension, and War began turning out Family Stone-esque material. The Temptations' single "Cloud Nine" was inspired by "Dance to the Music" and was a top ten hit, winning a Grammy Award. "Dance to the Music" and the later Family Stone singles also helped lead to the development of funk music.

In 1998, "Dance to the Music" was admitted into the Grammy Hall of Fame.

== Certifications ==
Region	Certification	Certified units/sales
United States (RIAA)	Gold	500,000^{‡}
^{‡} Sales+streaming figures based on certification alone.

== Personnel ==
- Sly Stone – vocals, Hammond organ
- Freddie Stone – vocals, guitar
- Larry Graham – vocals, bass guitar
- Cynthia Robinson – trumpet, vocal ad-libs
- Jerry Martini – saxophone, clarinet
- Greg Errico – drums
- Written and produced by Sly Stone

== Charts ==
Chart performance for "Dance to the Music"
Chart (2025)	Peak position
Japan Hot Overseas (Billboard Japan)	8
