= Jerry Martini =

American saxophonist (born 1943)

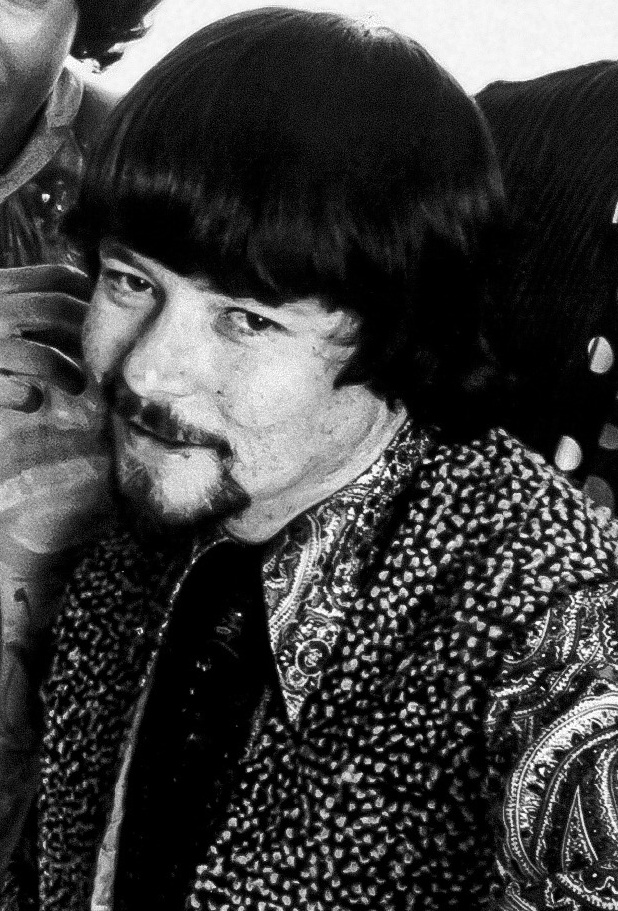
- Martini in 1968

Background information
- Born: Gerald L. Martini; October 1, 1942 (age 83)
- Genres: Funk, soul, R&B, rock
- Occupation: Saxophonist
- Years active: 1961–present

Gerald L. Martini (born October 1, 1942) is an American musician, best known for being the saxophonist for Sly and the Family Stone. He was inducted into the Rock and Roll Hall of Fame in 1993 as a member of Sly and the Family Stone.

== Early life ==
Martini was born in Denver, Colorado. He was introduced to music at an early age. By 12 years old, he had learned to play the ukulele, accordion, and clarinet. It was at 13 he learned the saxophone, his instrument of choice. Only two years later, he began gigging at local bars.

== Early career ==
While gigging, Martini attended San Francisco City College for three years attending music classes. Meanwhile, he played in a local band called Joe Piazza and the Continentals. It was here he befriended and first played alongside Sly Stone. The group frequently provided music for the popular television show KPIX Dance Party hosted by Dick Stewart. Martini's reputation grew even more when the Continentals backed the popular group The Viscaynes on the recording of their hit single "Yellow Moon". The Continentals were also believed to be the backing group for an early Janet Ericco recording, "It Was A Lie" b/w "Come Along With Me" under the pseudonym The Twilights.

After leaving the Continentals, Martini joined a popular interracial cover group called George and Teddy and the Condors, where he built his reputation even more. Sly Stone even used Martini to play on Bobby Freeman's 1964 single, "C'mon and Swim". After scoring a deal with Warner Brothers, George and Teddy and the Condors were sent to Italy in 1965 to build their fanbase. The tour bombed, and Martini realized that the band was going nowhere. While Stone held a disc jockey gig at KSOL, Martini stopped by once a week to visit. He approached him with an idea of forming a band, which Stone eventually took him up on.

== Sly and the Family Stone ==
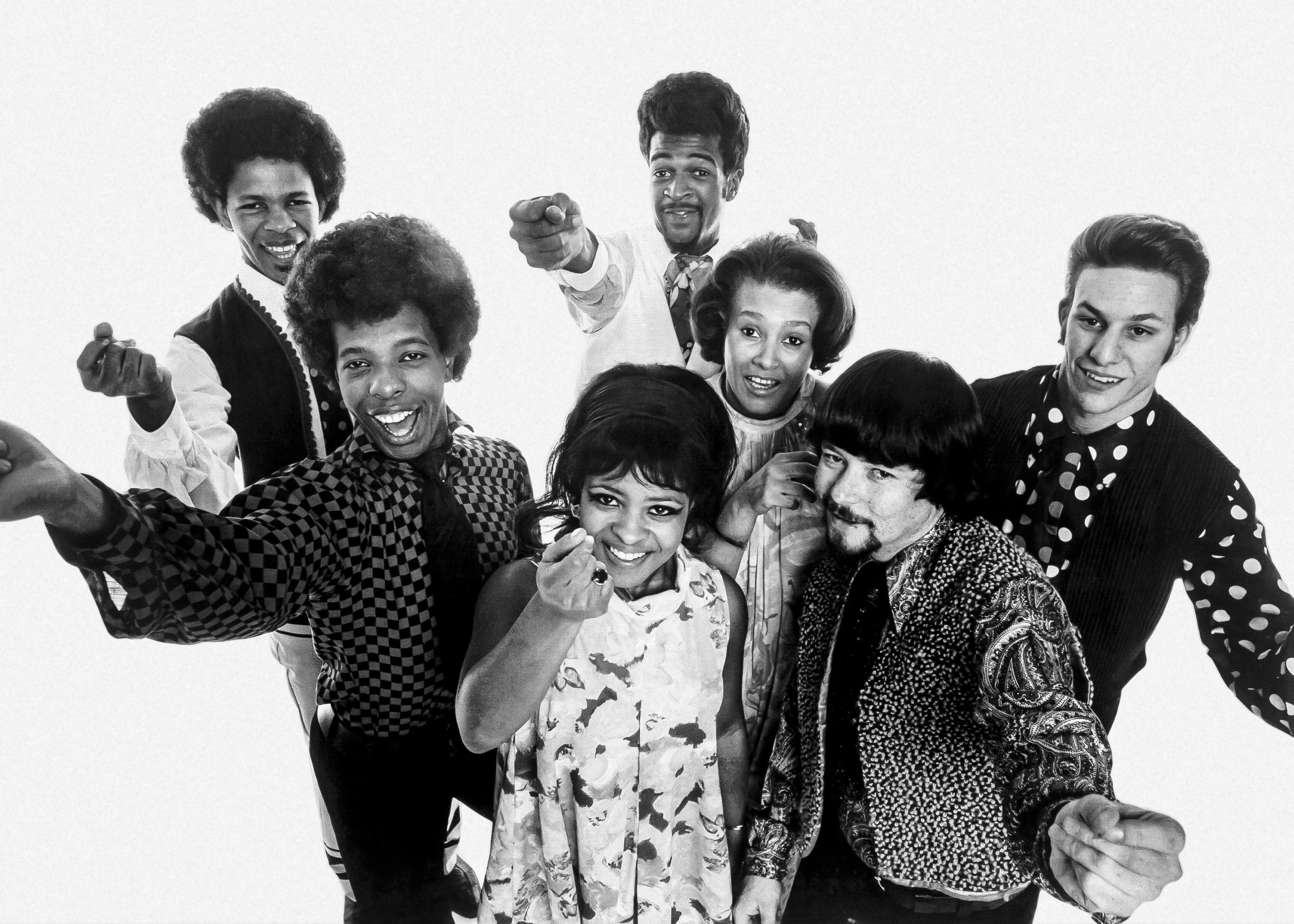
Sly and the Family Stone in 1968. Left to right: Freddie Stone, Sly Stone, Rose Stone, Larry Graham, Cynthia Robinson, Jerry Martini, and Greg Errico.

Sly and the Family Stone was formed at Martini's suggestion. The group, which also included some of Stone’s relatives achieved critical and commercial success by the end of 1960s, and would be known for tracks like "Everyday People", and for including both black and white members. He performed with the band from its inception in 1967 to its demise in 1975.

== Outside Sly and the Family Stone ==
In 1975, he appeared on Sly Stone's first solo album, High on You.

In 1977, he also performed on Larry Graham's Graham Central Station fifth album, Now Do U Wanta Dance. He was also in the band Rubicon during the late 1970s.

In 2004–2005, he helped form the tribute band Family Stone Experience bringing together several Family Stone alumni, including Greg Errico, Cynthia Robinson, Dawn Silva and Gail Muldrow amongst others.

In February 2017, Martini was performing with the band Family Stone at the La Mirada Theatre for the Performing Arts. In August 2019, Martini toured with Family Stone.
