= The Essential Sly & the Family Stone =

Greatest hits album by Sly and the Family Stone
- Released: March 11, 2002
- Recorded: 1967—1975
- Length: 2:05:13
- Labels: Epic; Legacy
- Producers: Bob Irwin; Jerry Goldstein

Sly and the Family Stone chronology
Precious Stone – Sly Stone in the Studio 1963-1965 (1994)	The Essential Sly & the Family Stone (2002)	Different Strokes by Different Folks (2005)

The Essential Sly & the Family Stone is a 2002 compilation album by the American band Sly & the Family Stone, released on March 11, 2002, on Epic Records and Legacy Recordings. It is a part of the multi-artist series of albums released under Sony Music and Legacy Recordings' The Essential series, although The Essential Sly & the Family Stone was released on Epic Records rather than Sony Music. A "special edition" version featuring an extra disc was released in 2008.

== Critical reception ==
Professional ratings
Review scores
Source	Rating
AllMusic	4.5/5 stars
The Encyclopedia of Popular Music	4/5 stars
Rolling Stone	5/5 stars
Tom Hull - on the Web	A−
Uncut	2/5 stars

In an AllMusic review, Richie Unterberger states that it "does what a double-CD best-of/career overview should do: it packs a lot of career highlights into a two-disc set for listeners who want more than the basic greatest hits, but don't want every last album" noting that "This doesn't quite deserve the highest rating, as the post-There's a Riot Goin' On material doesn't keep up the momentum of the rest of the set" concluding by noting that "This deserves better annotation than the cursory liner notes, but otherwise it's an excellent summary of a major rock and soul band. A staff writer of PopMatters called it "the most comprehensive compilation of the band’s greatest work, and it contains the latest digitally remastered versions of the group’s best songs" noting that "I fully expected to endorse this new package, but if truth be told, I do not recommend buying it", adding that "Anthology is more enjoyable to listen to than The Essential Sly and the Family Stone is. Plus, Anthology poetically concludes with an essential recording not found on this compilation, Sly’s stunning version of Ray Evans and Jay Livingston’s “Qué Sera, Sera (Whatever Will Be, Will Be)", concluding in a small paragraph by advising that readers do not buy the album, but rather buy Anthology and There’s A Riot Goin' On instead. Edward Gavin writes in a Rolling Stone magazine review that "The first disc of this masterly collection includes all the hits one would hope for". Uncut magazine writes that "This double-disc compilation is the latest in a long line of anthologies of the group’s work and is without doubt the best so far", adding that "Indeed, all the good stuff from these albums is collected here, rendering it almost unnecessary to buy them as separate issues. Highly recommended." Will Hermes wrote in a Spin magazine review that it has "One double CD with all the classics and plenty of hot also-rans." Mike Duquette called it a "nice, thick first step in a new Sly collection, but not as appealing as Greatest Hits by a long shot."

== Track listing ==
All tracks are written by Sylvester Stewart, except where noted.

Disc one
No.	Title	Original release	Length
1.	"Underdog"	A Whole New Thing (1967)	3:58
2.	"I Cannot Make It"	A Whole New Thing	3:19
3.	"Dance to the Music"	Dance to the Music (1968)	2:59
4.	"Are You Ready"	Dance to the Music	2:49
5.	"Fun"	Life (1968)	2:22
6.	"M'Lady"	Life	2:45
7.	"Life"	Life	3:00
8.	"Love City"	Life	2:43
9.	"Stand!"	Stand! (1969)	3:08
10.	"Don't Call Me Nigger, Whitey"	Stand!	5:59
11.	"I Want to Take You Higher"	Stand!	5:23
12.	"Somebody's Watching You"	Stand!	3:20
13.	"Sing a Simple Song"	Stand!	3:56
14.	"Everyday People"	Stand!	2:21
15.	"You Can Make It If You Try"	Stand!	3:39
16.	"Hot Fun in the Summertime"	Greatest Hits (1970)	2:38
17.	"Everybody Is a Star"	Greatest Hits	3:03
18.	"Thank You (Falettinme Be Mice Elf Agin)"	Greatest Hits	4:48

Disc two
No.	Title	Original release	Length
1.	"Family Affair"	There's a Riot Goin' On (1971)	3:05
2.	"Luv n' Haight"	There's a Riot Goin' On	4:03
3.	"Poet"	There's a Riot Goin' On	3:01
4.	"(You Caught Me) Smilin'"	There's a Riot Goin' On	2:54
5.	"Runnin' Away"	There's a Riot Goin' On	2:56
6.	"Brave & Strong"	There's a Riot Goin' On	3:30
7.	"Just Like a Baby"	There's a Riot Goin' On	5:12
8.	"Thank You for Talkin' to Me, Africa"	There's a Riot Goin' On	7:15
9.	"In Time"	Fresh (1973)	5:49
10.	"If You Want Me to Stay"	Fresh	3:01
11.	"Frisky"	Fresh	3:12
12.	"Skin I'm In"	Fresh	2:54
13.	"Babies Makin' Babies"	Fresh	3:39
14.	"If It Were Left Up to Me"	Fresh	1:58
15.	"Time for Livin'"	Small Talk	3:17
16.	"Loose Booty"	Small Talk	3:46
17.	"I Get High on You"	High on You (1975)	3:13
Total length:			2:05:13

Disc three (Special Edition 3.0 edition)
No.	Title	Lyrics	Music	Original release	Length
1.	"Fresh"			Dance to the Music	2:47
2.	"Dynamite!"			Life	2:44
3.	"Sex Machine"			Stand!	13:46
4.	"Time"			There's a Riot Goin' On	3:04
5.	"Que Sera, Sera (Whatever Will Be, Will Be)" (Doris Day cover)	Ray Evans	Jay Livingston	Fresh	5:20
6.	"Can't Strain My Brain"			Small Talk	4:08
