= Greatest Hits (Sly and the Family Stone album) =

Greatest hits album by Sly and the Family Stone
- Released: October, 1970
- Recorded: 1967–69
- Genres: Psychedelic soul; rock; funk; pop
- Length: 39:56
- Label: Epic
- Producer: Sly Stone

Sly and the Family Stone chronology
Stand! (1969)	Greatest Hits (1970)	There's a Riot Goin' On (1971)

Singles from Greatest Hits
- 1. "Hot Fun in the Summertime" / "Fun" Released: August 1969; 2. "Thank You (Falettinme Be Mice Elf Agin)" / "Everybody Is a Star" Released: December 1969

Greatest Hits is a compilation album by the American group Sly and the Family Stone. It was first released in October, by Epic Records and charted on Billboard 200 on November 7th 1970. The album includes all of the singles from the albums Dance to the Music (1968), Life (1968), and Stand! (1969).

Three tracks released on singles in 1969 appear on album for the first time here: "Hot Fun in the Summertime", "Everybody Is a Star", and "Thank You (Falettinme Be Mice Elf Agin)".

The recordings on this compilation are not the same as the single versions in all cases; some songs appear here in their album lengths and mixes. Mixes sometimes have different editing and changes in vocals and or instrumentation.

Greatest Hits was certified quintuple platinum by the Recording Industry Association of America (RIAA), having shipped five million copies in the United States. In 2003, Rolling Stone magazine ranked the album number 60 on its list of the 500 greatest albums of all time, 61 in a 2012 revised list, and number 343 in the 2020 rankings.

== Release ==
The album was released in the midst of an eighteen-month stretch from late 1969 to late 1971, during which Sly & the Family Stone released no new material, Greatest Hits was designed by Epic Records to appease consumer demand and keep the band's name and music in the public's eye. Greatest Hits peaked at #2 on the Billboard 200, and was the band's most successful album.

Prior to the release of this album in November 1970 the musicians were not able to make stereo mixes of "Hot Fun in the Summertime", "Everybody is a Star" and "Thank You (Falettinme Be Mice Elf Agin)". Epic "re-channelled" the mono singles tracks for the stereo LP, using technology similar to the Duophonic sound process.

The entire album was also remixed in 1971 for release in four channel quadraphonic sound. The quad album appeared in the SQ matrix format on LP and on quad 8-track tape. The SQ system was compatible with conventional stereo playback systems. Until 2007, the rather rare quadraphonic LP was the only source of "true stereo" versions of the three singles tracks.

Early Compact Disc copies in 1987 came from the stereo LP tapes with the re-channeled recordings. Standard stereo mixes of the three singles were finally done when the recordings were digitally remastered in the 1990s. In 2007, the CD was re-issued by Epic/Legacy with all true stereo mixes and improved overall sound quality.

The quadraphonic version was reissued as a hybrid multichannel Super Audio CD by Audio Fidelity in 2015. For this edition only, the mono single mixes were included in place of where the stereo recordings would otherwise be.

== Critical reception ==
Professional ratings
Review scores
Source	Rating
AllMusic	5/5 stars
Christgau's Record Guide	A+
Encyclopedia of Popular Music	4/5 stars
PopMatters	8/10
The Rolling Stone Album Guide	5/5 stars
Select	4/5

Reviewing for Rolling Stone in December 1970, Jon Landau said that Sly Stone's style is "so infinite and revolves around so many crucial aspects that it has only come together perfectly on a handful of his singles", the best of which are compiled on Greatest Hits. Although he found occasionally "trite" music and lyrics, Landau felt that most of the songs "alone stand as a tribute to one of the most original and creative rock musicians." In the March 1971 edition of Ebony, Phyl Garland hailed it as among the best recent "best of" LPs and "a true bonanza" of psychedelic soul, recommended especially for fans of the genre. In Christgau's Record Guide: Rock Albums of the Seventies (1981), Robert Christgau said that, although he has "doubts" about the band's studio albums, Greatest Hits is "among the greatest rock and roll LPs of all time", adding that Stone's political songs are "uplifting but never simplistic or sentimental". He also asserted that the music's flashy stereo separations, vocal sounds, and register alterations made Greatest Hits "the toughest commercial experiments in rock and roll history".

Reviewing the 1987 CD reissue in his Rock n Roll on Compact Disc guide, journalist David Prakel applauded the distinctive fusion Sly and the Family Stone had created in mixing "brassy funk and psychedelic heavy rock against a back beat", or "black soul and white rock" with "danceability". However, he was ambivalent about the remastering while observing "a dated boxy characteristic and compression in many of these tracks". Bill Shapiro was more enthusiastic in The CD Rock & Roll Library: 30 Years of Rock & Roll on Compact Disc, finding the sound "bright, crisp, clean, clear, detailed and dynamic" overall. Of Greatest Hits in general, he called it "one of the best compilation rock/pop/funk recordings ever" and "chock full of brilliant, influential, and too-often-overlooked pop greatness" that will make listeners "dance and smile". In his review of the 2007 reissue, Andrew Gilstrap from PopMatters said that, although it is not comprehensive, the "slapped-together feel" may be "part of what makes Greatest Hits work so well, as if it was put together with the same freewheeling spirit that characterized the band." AllMusic editor Stephen Thomas Erlewine deemed it "one of the greatest party records of all time". He went further in claiming that music is "rarely as vivacious, vigorous, and vibrant as this", and that greatest hits albums "don't come better than this – in fact, music rarely does."

== Track listing ==
All songs written by Sylvester Stewart, and produced and arranged by Sly Stone (Sylvester Stewart) for Stone Flower Productions. Superscripts denote original album sources, referenced below.

Side one

1. "I Want to Take You Higher" – 5:22 ^{c}
2. "Everybody Is a Star" – 3:00
3. "Stand!" – 3:08 ^{c}
4. "Life" – 2:58 ^{b}
5. "Fun" – 2:20 ^{b}
6. "You Can Make It If You Try" – 3:39 ^{c}

Side two

1. "Dance to the Music" – 2:58 ^{a}
2. "Everyday People" – 2:20 ^{c}
3. "Hot Fun in the Summertime" – 2:37
4. "M'Lady" – 2:44 ^{b}
5. "Sing a Simple Song" – 3:55 ^{c}
6. "Thank You (Falettinme Be Mice Elf Agin)" – 4:50

Notes

- ^{a} from Dance to the Music (1968)
- ^{b} from Life (1968)
- ^{c} from Stand! (1969)
- "Everybody is a Star", "Hot Fun in the Summertime" and "Thank You (Falettinme Be Mice Elf Agin)" make their first album appearance.

== Personnel ==
Sly and the Family Stone

- Sly Stone - vocals, organ, guitar, piano, harmonica, and more
- Freddie Stone - vocals, guitar
- Larry Graham - vocals, bass guitar
- Rose Stone - vocals, piano, keyboards
- Cynthia Robinson - trumpet, vocal ad-libs
- Jerry Martini - saxophone
- Greg Errico - drums
- Little Sister (Vet Stone, Mary McCreary, Elva Mouton) - background vocals

== Charts ==
Title	Information
"Hot Fun in the Summertime"	Epic single 10450, 1969; B-side: "Fun"
"Thank You (Falettinme Be Mice Elf Agin)"/ "Everybody Is a Star"	Epic single 10555, 1969; Double A-sided single

Name	Chart (1969 - 1970)	Peak position
Greatest Hits	U.S. Billboard Pop Albums	2
Greatest Hits	U.S. Top R&B Albums	1
"Hot Fun in the Summertime"	U.S. Billboard Pop Singles	2
"Hot Fun in the Summertime"	U.S. Billboard R&B Singles	3
"Thank You (Falettinme Be Mice Elf Agin)"/ "Everybody Is a Star"	U.S. Billboard Pop Singles	1
"Thank You (Falettinme Be Mice Elf Agin)"/ "Everybody Is a Star"	U.S. Billboard R&B Singles	1

=== Year-end charts ===
Chart (1971)	Position
US Billboard 200	9

== Certifications ==
Region	Certification	Certified units/sales
United States (RIAA)	5× Platinum	5,000,000^{^}
^{^} Shipments figures based on certification alone.

== See also ==
- List of number-one R&B albums of 1970 (U.S.)

== Bibliography ==
- Christgau, Robert (1981). Christgau's Record Guide: Rock Albums of the Seventies. Ticknor & Fields. ISBN 0-89919-026-X.
- Coleman, Mark; et al. (2004). Brackett, Nathan; Hoard, Christian (eds.). The New Rolling Stone Album Guide (4th ed.). Simon & Schuster. ISBN 0-7432-0169-8.
