= There's a Riot Goin' On =

Studio album by Sly and the Family Stone
- Released: November 1, 1971
- Recorded: 1970–71
- Studio: The Record Plant (Sausalito)
- Genres: Psychedelic funk; avant-soul; avant-pop; deep funk; psychedelic soul
- Length: 47:33
- Label: Epic
- Producer: Sly Stone

Sly and the Family Stone chronology
Greatest Hits (1970)	There's a Riot Goin' On (1971)	Fresh (1973)

Alternative cover
- 1986 LP reissue

Singles from There's a Riot Goin' On
- 1. "Family Affair" Released: November 6, 1971; 2. "Runnin' Away" Released: February 5, 1972; 3. "(You Caught Me) Smilin'" Released: April 22, 1972

There's a Riot Goin' On is the fifth studio album by the American funk and soul band Sly and the Family Stone. It was released on November 1, 1971, by Epic Records. The recording was dominated by band frontman-songwriter Sly Stone during a period of escalated drug use and intra-group tension. Recording sessions took place from 1970 to 1971 at Record Plant Studios in Sausalito, California and in Stone's home studio in Bel Air.

With the album, Sly and the Family Stone departed from the optimistic sound of their previous music and explored a darker, more challenging sound featuring edgy funk rhythms, a primitive drum machine, extensive overdubbing, and a dense mix. Conceptually and lyrically, There's a Riot Goin' On embraced apathy, pessimism, and disillusionment with both Stone's fame and 1960s counterculture amid a turbulent political climate in the United States at the turn of the 1970s, influenced by the decline of the civil rights movement and the rise of the Black Power movement. The album's title was originally planned to be Africa Talks to You, but it changed in response to Marvin Gaye's album What's Going On (1971), released six months before Riot.

A commercial success, There's a Riot Goin' On topped the Billboard Pop Album and Soul Album charts, while its lead single "Family Affair" reached number one on the Pop Singles chart. In 2001, the album was certified platinum by the Recording Industry Association of America (RIAA) for sales of at least one million copies in the US. Originally released to mixed reviews, the album has since been praised as one of the greatest and most influential recordings of all time, having impacted the funk, jazz-funk, and hip hop genres in particular. It has appeared in publications' best-album lists, including Rolling Stone's "500 Greatest Albums of All Time", on which it placed 99th in 2003 and 82nd in 2020.

In 1999, the album was inducted into the Grammy Hall of Fame.

== Background ==
Having achieved great success with their 1969 album Stand! and performance at Woodstock, Sly & the Family Stone were due to have submitted an album of new recordings to Epic Records by 1970. However, Sly Stone missed several recording deadlines, worrying CBS executive Clive Davis, and a Greatest Hits album was released in an eighteen-month stretch during which the band released no new material, except for the single "Thank You (Falettinme Be Mice Elf Agin)". Relationships within the band were deteriorating, with friction between the Stone brothers and bassist Larry Graham.

Jewish-American manager David Kapralik claimed that the Black Panther Party was urging Stone to replace him with a black manager. After moving to Los Angeles, California, in late 1969, Stone and his bandmates began to use cocaine and PCP heavily rather than recording music. During this time Sly & the Family Stone released only one single, "Thank You (Falettinme Be Mice Elf Agin)" / "Everybody Is a Star", issued in December 1969. Although "Star" was a positive song in the vein of their previous hit "Everyday People" (1968), "Thank You" featured a darker political theme.

By 1970, Stone had become erratic and moody, missing nearly a third of the band's concert dates. He hired streetwise friends Hamp "Bubba" Banks and J.B. Brown as his personal managers, and they enlisted gangsters Edward "Eddie Chin" Elliott and Mafioso J.R. Valtrano as his bodyguards. Stone assigned these individuals to handle his business dealings, find drugs and protect him from those he considered enemies, among them his own bandmates and staff. A rift developed between Sly and the rest of the band, which led to drummer Gregg Errico's departure in early 1971. Speculation arose as to the release of new studio material. In a December 24, 1970 article for Rolling Stone magazine, journalist Jon Landau wrote:

The man from Epic tells me that Sly hasn't recorded much lately. His last album of new material was released well over a year ago and even 'Thank You', his last single, is old by now. Greatest Hits was released only as a last resort in order to get something salable into the record stores. It was a necessary release and stands as the final record of the first chapter in Sly & the Family Stone's career. Whatever the reasons for his recording abstinence, I hope it ends soon so that he can get back to making new music and we can get back to listening to it.

Stone's intention of a darker, more conceptual work was influenced by drug use and the events that writer Miles Marshall Lewis called "the death of the Sixties"; political assassinations, police brutality, the decline of the civil rights movement and social disillusionment. According to The Austin Chronicle, "slowed down, [Sly's] quest for post-stardom identity mirrored black America's quest for post-Sixties purpose."

== Recording and production ==
Sly Stone mostly worked on There's a Riot Goin' On alone in a studio that he had built for himself at The Plant Studios, also known as The Record Plant, in Sausalito, California, or at his home studio in the loft of his Bel Air mansion. He would often lie down in the bed and record his vocals with a wireless microphone system. According to the other Family Stone members, most of the album was performed by him alone, overdubbing and sometimes using a drum machine to lay down beats, namely the Maestro Rhythm King MRK-2, which featured preset rhythms. Stone felt that the rhythm box made unrealistic sounds if used as designed, so he resorted to overdubbing the drum sounds manually, contributing to the dense mix.

Other band members contributed by overdubbing alone with Sly instead of playing together as before. For "Family Affair" and some other tracks Stone enlisted several other musicians including Billy Preston, Ike Turner, and Bobby Womack instead of his bandmates, and several female vocalists mostly omitted from the final mix. The album's muddy, gritty sound was due in part to this overdubbing and erasing and mixing techniques nearly drowned out undubbed sounds. Miles Marshall Lewis stated, "Never before on a Sly and the Family Stone album were songs open to so much interpretation, and even more so, dripping with cynicism. On the other hand you can hardly hear what he's saying for most of the album. Like Radiohead's Kid A (2000) or even the Rolling Stones' Exile on Main St. (1972) more recent to the time, a murkiness in the mix of the record inhibits complete comprehension of the words."

In the fall of 1971 Stone delivered the final mixes to the CBS Records offices, relieving the worried Davis. CBS issued "Family Affair" as the first single, the band's first in nearly two years. A somber, electric piano-based record sung by Sly (in a low, relaxed tone) and sister Rose Stone, it became their fourth and final number-one pop hit. It is one of the earliest hit recordings to use a drum machine – a slightly earlier Sly Stone production, Little Sister's "Somebody's Watching You", was also among the first.

== Music and lyrics ==
"Luv n' Haight"
The opening track's tough, experimental groove exemplifies the band's new direction in funk at the turn of the 1970s.

"(You Caught Me) Smilin'"
The minimalist soul song contains a horn-driven melody, raspy vocals and delicate keyboard lines.

"Thank You for Talkin' to Me, Africa"
The closing track ends Riot with its heavy funk and hedonistic themes throughout a dark soundscape.

There's a Riot Goin' On has been described as psychedelic funk, avant-soul, avant-pop, deep funk, and psychedelic soul. The album departs from the optimistic psychedelic soul sound of the group's 1960s records, instead embracing a darker sound featuring filtered drum-machine tracks. Songs such as "Luv 'n Haight", "Thank You for Talking to Me Africa", and "Spaced Cowboy" are characterized by edgier, unrelenting grooves with rhythmic sounds resembling murmuring noises. Conceptually, Riot embraces apathy as a source for deriving rhythmic and emotional energy, departing from the more welcoming sentiments of songs like "Dance to the Music" (1968). As The New York Times writer Jon Pareles explains, it was "about turning away from the post-1960s turbulence of the Nixon presidency and withdrawing into music as a hazy refuge", exemplified in the opening track "Luv n' Haight" and its declaration of "Feel so good inside myself, don't want to move".

"Luv n' Haight" is satirically titled as a reference to the Haight-Ashbury scene, while the music and lyrics express disillusionment with the 1960s counterculture. BBC Music's Stevie Chick cites the track, with its "desperate call-and-response set to fiercely combative lick", as an example of Riot's "dark" and "troubled" funk. "Africa Talks to You" is a nine-minute funk jam written in response to the backlash Sly Stone received from estranged fans and friends, record industry associates, and the media. According to biographer Eddie Santiago, the lyrics cynically portray "fame and its cold retrogression into perceived insanity", with a chorus that reflects "Sly's feelings on being cut down in his prime like a tree in the forest."

The album's title track is silent and listed as zero minutes and zero seconds long. For many years it was speculated that this cryptic track listing and the title of the album referred to a July 27, 1970, riot in Chicago for which Sly & the Family Stone had been blamed. The band was to play a free show in Grant Park but the crowd became restless before the band began and started rioting. Over a hundred people were injured, including several police officers, and the reason given to the press was that the band was late and/or refused to perform. The original LP jacket featured a photo collage with a picture of the band-shell in Grant Park overlaid with a photo of a police car. However, in 1997 Sly Stone said that the "There's a Riot Goin' On" track had no running time simply because "I felt there should be no riots."

The closing track "Thank You for Talking to Me Africa" is a slow reworking of Sly and the Family Stone's 1969 "Thank You" single. The result is described by AllMusic's Matthew Greenwald as a blues- and gospel-influenced examination of urban tension and the end of the 1960s. He goes on to say it is "perhaps the most frightening recording from the dawn of the 1970s, capturing all of the drama, ennui, and hedonism of the decade to come with almost a clairvoyant feel."

== Artwork ==
The original cover art for Riot featured a modified version of the flag of the United States, featuring a black canton with nine-point suns in place of a blue canton with five-point stars. No other text or titles appear on the cover, although Epic executives added a "Featuring the Hit Single 'Family Affair'" sticker to the LP for commercial viability and identification purposes. Family Stone A&R director Steve Paley took the photograph. Three of the custom flags were created: one for Sly, one for Epic Records, and one for Paley.

In an interview with Jonathan Dakss, Stone explained the album cover's concept, stating "I wanted the flag to truly represent people of all colors. I wanted the color black because it is the absence of color. I wanted the color white because it is the combination of all colors. And I wanted the color red because it represents the one thing that all people have in common: blood. I wanted suns instead of stars because stars to me imply searching, like you search for your star. And there are already too many stars in this world. But the sun, that's something that is always there, looking right at you. Betsy Ross did the best she could with what she had. I thought I could do better."

The outer album sleeve features a photo collage, by artist Lynn Ames, depicting American cultural images of the early 1970s. Featured on this collage were color photos and black & whites of the Family Stone, the Capitol, a grinning boy in plaid pants, the American flag with a peace sign in place of the stars, the Marina City twin towers of Chicago, a Department of Public Works caution sign, a piece of the Gettysburg Address, the tail end of a gas guzzler, drummer Buddy Miles, the Lincoln Memorial, soul musician Bobby Womack, a bulldog, several anonymous smiling faces, and Sly's pit bull, Gun.

== Reception and legacy ==
Retrospective professional reviews
Review scores
Source	Rating
AllMusic	5/5 stars
Christgau's Record Guide	A+
Encyclopedia of Popular Music	5/5 stars
The Guardian	4/5 stars
PopMatters	8/10
Q	4/5 stars
Rolling Stone	5/5 stars
The Rolling Stone Album Guide	5/5 stars
Stylus Magazine	A
Uncut	5/5 stars

There's a Riot Goin' On was met with a divided response from professional critics and general listeners, who found its production and lyrical content particularly challenging. Reviewing in November 1971 for the Los Angeles Times, Robert Hilburn disapproved of the Family Stone's stylistic change from "soulflavored" songs such as "Everyday People" and "Hot Fun in the Summertime", while saying that "there is little on the album that is worth your attention". Fellow critic Greil Marcus called the record "Muzak with its finger on the trigger." Others were more overt in their praise. Rolling Stone reviewer Vince Aletti wrote that, "At first I hated it for its weakness and its lack of energy and I still dislike these qualities. But then I began to respect the album's honesty". Aletti cited it as "one of the most important fucking albums this year" and "the new urban music... not about dancing to the music, in the streets. It's about disintegration, getting fucked up, nodding, maybe dying. There are flashes of euphoria, ironic laughter, even some bright stretches but mostly it's just junkie death, oddly unoppressive and almost attractive in its effortlessness". A columnist for Hit Parader magazine gave Riot a favorable review, and stated that the album has "a lot that makes Sly the in-person rave that he is." In The Village Voice, Robert Christgau concluded that "what's expressed is the bitterest ghetto pessimism", backed by "subtle production techniques and jarring song compositions", while declaring Riot to be "one of those rare albums whose whole actually does exceed the sum of its parts".

There's a Riot Goin' On was included on several music publications' "End of the Year" lists and critics' polls, including The Village Voice's Pazz & Jop albums list at number seven. The album achieved commercial success with two hit singles and reaching number-one on the Billboard Pop Albums and Soul Albums chart. It later came to be viewed by critics as one of the greatest and most influential albums. Christgau wrote in 2007 that the "temptations and contradictions" of commercial stardom consumed Sly Stone and resulted in "the prophetic 1971" album, "its taped-over murk presaging Exile on Main St., its drum-machine beats throwing knuckleballs at Miles [Davis] and JB [James Brown], it was darker than the Velvet Underground and Nico and funkier than shit, yet somehow it produced two smash hits, including the stark, deep 'Family Affair'." AllMusic described the album as "funk at its deepest and most impenetrable," stating that "what makes Riot so remarkable is that it's hard not to get drawn in with him, as you're seduced by the narcotic grooves, seductive vocals slurs, leering electric pianos, and crawling guitars." Zeth Lundy of PopMatters deemed it "a challenging listen, at times rambling, incoherent, dissonant, and just plain uncomfortable" with "some episodic moments of pop greatness to be found". Lundy went on to discuss its radical departure from the band's past music:

[It] sank their previously burgeoning idealism at a time when social disillusionment was all the rage. Sly had found something else to take him higher and, as a result, Riot is a record very much informed by drugs, paranoia, and a sort of halfhearted malcontent ... listening to it isn't exactly a pleasurable experience. It's significant in the annals of pop and soul because it is blunt and unflinching, because it reflects personal and cultural crises in a manner unbecoming for pop records at the time. Riot can be classified as avant-soul only after being recognized as a soul nightmare—the 'nightmare', so to speak, being a reflection of an unfortunate and uncompromised reality, not a glossed-over pop-music approximation of reality.

There's a Riot Goin' On has been considered one of the first instances of the funk music later popularized by George Clinton and Funkadelic, the Ohio Players, and similar acts. The album, as well as the follow-ups Fresh and Small Talk, are considered among the first and best examples of the matured version of funk music, after prototypical instances of the sound in Sly & the Family Stone's 1960s work. Riot's sound also helped inspire Miles Davis and Herbie Hancock to crossover to jazz-funk. It was called "a masterpiece of darkly psychedelic funk" by AllMusic contributor Steve Huey, and "a phenomenal, dirty, psychedelic funk album" by Drowned in Sound journalist Jon Falcone, who said it soundtracked the political and social turbulence that opened the 1970s. Paul Grimstad from Brooklyn Rail regarded it as a "frigid yet weirdly intimate" avant-pop record.

In 1994, There's a Riot Going On was ranked number 14 in Colin Larkin's Top 50 Soul Albums. Larkin described the album as "unlike anything heard before in black music". A 2003 article for Rolling Stone commented; "Sly and the Family Stone created a musical utopia: an interracial group of men and women who blended funk, rock and positive vibes... Sly Stone ultimately discovered that his utopia had a ghetto, and he brilliantly tore the whole thing down on There's a Riot Goin' On, which does not refute the joy of his earlier music." In addition to being featured near the top of several major publications' "best album" lists, Riot was also ranked at number 99 on Rolling Stone's 2003 list of the 500 Greatest Albums of All Time, maintaining the rating in a 2012 revised list, one of four Sly & the Family Stone entries to be included on the list; it is the second highest of the band's entries, preceded by Greatest Hits (No. 60), and followed by Stand! (No. 118) and Fresh (No. 186). In the 2020 updated list, the album was raised to No. 82 and became the highest ranked of the three Sly & The Family Stone entries, ahead of Stand! (No. 119) & Greatest Hits (No. 343). Pitchfork named it the fourth best album of the 1970s.

Riot's songs have been extensively covered and sampled. Artists who have covered or reworked its songs include Iggy Pop, John Legend, Lalah Hathaway, Ultramagnetic MC's, De La Soul, Beastie Boys and Gwen Guthrie. Dave Rosen of Ink Blot magazine said that the album sounds unique, ironically in view of its vast influence; "Sly employed the unconventional (and possibly entirely original) technique of mixing live drums with what was at the time a primitive drum machine ... The introspective, yet political lyrics, the hard and dirty funk grooves, the inspirational, yet depressing songs—all of these elements would come to influence not only peers like Marvin Gaye and James Brown, but two generations of rappers and funkateers who paid homage to Sly's vision by making his samples and beats an essential backbone of their own innovations. Sly's Riot is still goin' on." In a book on the album for the 33⅓ series, Miles Marshall Lewis described it as "one of the most powerful and haunting albums to inspire the hip hop movement" and in Rolling Stone, Micheangelo Matos called this music a "Rosetta stone of dark funk and proto-hip-hop blues". The singer Bilal names it among his 25 favorite albums, appreciating the drum machine sounds in particular.

== Track listing ==
All tracks written, produced and arranged by Sylvester "Sly Stone" Stewart for Stone Flower Productions.

Side one
No.	Title	Length
1.	"Luv n' Haight"	4:01
2.	"Just Like a Baby"	5:12
3.	"Poet"	3:01
4.	"Family Affair"	3:06
5.	"Africa Talks to You 'The Asphalt Jungle'"	8:45
6.	"There's a Riot Goin' On" (timed at 0:04 on compact disc)	0:00

Side two
No.	Title	Length
1.	"Brave & Strong"	3:28
2.	"(You Caught Me) Smilin'"	2:53
3.	"Time"	3:03
4.	"Spaced Cowboy"	3:57
5.	"Runnin' Away"	2:51
6.	"Thank You for Talkin' to Me Africa"	7:14

2007 CD bonus tracks
No.	Title	Length
13.	"Runnin' Away" (mono mix single version)	2:44
14.	"My Gorilla Is My Butler" (instrumental)	3:11
15.	"Do You Know What?" (instrumental)	7:16
16.	"That's Pretty Clean" (instrumental)	4:12

== Personnel ==
=== Musicians ===
- Sly Stone – arrangements, drums, drum programming, keyboard programming, synthesizers, guitar, bass, keyboards, vocals
- Rose Stone – vocals, keyboards
- Billy Preston – keyboards
- Jerry Martini – tenor saxophone
- Cynthia Robinson – trumpet, flugelhorn (track B5)
- Freddie Stone – guitar
- Ike Turner – guitar
- Bobby Womack – guitar
- Larry Graham – bass, backing vocals
- Greg Errico – drums
- Gerry Gibson – drums
- Little Sister – backing vocals

=== Production ===
- Sly Stone – producer
- Engineers
  - Chris Hinshaw
  - Jack Ashkinazy
  - James Conniff
  - James Greene
  - Robert Gratts
  - Willie Greer
  - Rich Tilles
- Artwork (collage, cover design)
  - Lynn Ames
  - John Berg
- Photography (reissue)
  - Debbie King
  - Don Hunstein
  - Fred Lombardi
  - Howard R. Cohen
  - Joey Franklin
  - Linda Tyler
  - Lynn Ames
  - Ray Gaspard
  - Steve Paley
  - Sylvester Stewart

== Charts ==
=== Weekly charts ===
Chart (1971–72)	Peak positions
U.S. Billboard 200	1
U.S. Billboard Top Soul Albums	1
Canadian RPM Albums Chart	4
UK Albums Chart	31

=== Year-end charts ===
Chart (1972)	Peak positions
U.S. Billboard 200	45
U.S. Billboard Top Soul Albums	9

=== Singles ===
Year	Name	US	US R&B	UK
1971	Family Affair	1	1	14
1972	Runnin' Away	23	15	17
1972	(You Caught Me) Smilin'	42	21	-

== See also ==
- List of Billboard 200 number-one albums of 1971
- List of Billboard 200 R&B number-one albums of 1972
