= Stand! =

Studio album by Sly and the Family Stone
- Released: May 3, 1969
- Recorded: 1968–1969
- Studio: Pacific High (San Francisco)
- Genres: Psychedelic soul; funk rock; funk; progressive soul; psychedelic funk
- Length: 41:27
- Label: Epic
- Producer: Sly Stone

Sly and the Family Stone chronology
Life (1968)	Stand! (1969)	Greatest Hits (1970)

Singles from Stand!
- 1. "Everyday People" / "Sing a Simple Song" Released: November 1968; 2. "Stand!" / "I Want to Take You Higher" Released: March 1969

Stand! is the fourth album by American soul-funk band Sly and the Family Stone, released on May 3, 1969. Written and produced by lead singer and multi-instrumentalist Sly Stone, Stand! is considered an artistic high-point of the band's career. Released by Epic Records, just before the group's celebrated performance at the Woodstock festival, it became the band's most commercially successful album to date. It includes several well-known songs, among them hit singles, such as "Sing a Simple Song", "I Want to Take You Higher", "Stand!", and "Everyday People". The album was reissued in 1987 on compact disc and vinyl, and again in 2007 as a remastered numbered edition digipack CD with bonus tracks and, in the UK, as only a CD with bonus tracks.

The album sold 500,000 copies in 1969 and was certified gold in sales by the RIAA on December 4 of that year. It peaked at number 13 on the Billboard 200 and stayed on the chart for nearly two years. By 1986, it had sold well over 1 million copies and was certified platinum in sales by the RIAA on November 21 of that same year. It then went on to sell over three million copies, becoming one of the most successful albums of the 1960s. In 2003, the album was ranked number 118 on Rolling Stone magazine's list of the 500 greatest albums of all time, 121 in a 2012 revised list, and number 119 in a 2020 reboot of the list. In 2015, the album was deemed "culturally, historically, or aesthetically significant" by the Library of Congress and selected for inclusion in the National Recording Registry. In 2015, Stand! was inducted into the Grammy Hall of Fame.

== Production ==
Stand! was recorded after Life, a commercially unsuccessful album. Although the Family Stone's single "Dance to the Music" was a top ten hit in early 1968, none of the band's first three albums reached above 100 on the Billboard 200. Stand! reached number thirteen and launched Sly Stone and his bandmates Freddie Stone, Larry Graham, Rose Stone, Cynthia Robinson, Jerry Martini, and Greg Errico into the pop music mainstream.

Much of the album was recorded at Pacific High Recording Studios in San Francisco. The band's A&R director and photographer Stephen Paley recalled how "together" Sly Stone was while working on Stand!, constantly referring to Walter Piston's Orchestration textbook, unlike his erratic behavior and work after he became dependent upon cocaine within a year of the album's success.

== Songs ==
Stand! begins with the title track on which Sly sings lead, a mid-tempo number launching into a gospel break for its final forty-nine seconds. Most of the Family Stone was unavailable for the session at which this coda was recorded: Sly, drummer Gregg Errico and horn players Cynthia Robinson and Jerry Martini were augmented by session players instead. Errico recalls that many liked the gospel extension more than they did the song proper, and that; "People would always ask, 'why didn't you go there and let that be the song?'" The second track, titled "Don't Call Me Nigger, Whitey", has few lyrics save for the chorus Don't call me "nigger", whitey/Don't call me "whitey", nigger and a single verse sung by Rose Stone. On "I Want to Take You Higher" Freddie Stone, Larry Graham, Rose Stone, and Sly Stone take turns delivering the lead vocal and all seven band-members deliver the shouted backing vocals. Sly Stone, Robinson, Freddie Stone, Graham, and Martini all play instrumental solos.

On "Somebody's Watching You" Sly Stone, Graham, Freddie Stone, and Rose Stone deliver the vocal in unison. The song's slightly pessimistic tone would be expanded upon later in the band's career with "Thank You (Falettinme Be Mice Elf Agin)" and the There's a Riot Goin' On LP, and would be a hit for the Family Stone's vocal group Little Sister, the first Top 40 single to use a drum machine. "Sing a Simple Song" urges the audience to "try a little do re mi fa so la ti do". Diana Ross & the Supremes, The Temptations and The Jackson 5 all recorded cover versions of the song. The track's guitar riff is heard on Ike & Tina Turner's "Bold Soul Sister" (from The Hunter, 1969), Jimi Hendrix's Band of Gypsys (1970) and Miles Davis' A Tribute to Jack Johnson (1971).

"Everyday People", already a number-one hit single in the United States by the time of the album's release, opens Side B. The most familiar song on the album, "Everyday People" popularized the expression "different strokes for different folks". Sly Stone, Rose Stone and Cynthia Robinson sing lead and Larry Graham introduces the slap-pop style of bass he expanded on "Thank You (Falettinme Be Mice Elf Agin)". "Sex Machine" is a thirteen-minute jam that features Sly scatting through amplified distortion and allows each band member a solo. Gregg Errico's drum solo closes the song and the band members are heard bursting into laughter during the final seconds. Stand! concludes with "You Can Make It If You Try", sung by Sly Stone, Freddie Stone, and Larry Graham. Sly Stone instead of Larry Graham played the bass. It was, at one point, planned for a single release in mid-1969, following up "Stand!", but this was dropped in favor of the non-album track "Hot Fun in the Summertime". The unused mono single mix was later included on the 2007 CD reissue.

== Critical reception and legacy ==
Retrospective professional reviews
Review scores
Source	Rating
AllMusic	5/5 stars
The Austin Chronicle	4/5 stars
The Guardian	4/5 stars
MusicHound R&B	5/5 stars
PopMatters	10/10
Q	5/5 stars
Rolling Stone	4.5/5 stars
Stylus Magazine	A
Uncut	5/5 stars

Reviewing for Rolling Stone in July 1969, Alec Dubro observed a "very evident sense of moral purpose" in the content and a rawness in its brand of soul music, which he said "depends on sheer energy more than anything else". Overall, he found the album provocative and "effective", recommended "for anyone who can groove on a bunch of very raucous kids charging through a record, telling you exactly what they think whether you want to hear it that way or not." In the same magazine, covering Epic-Legacy's 2007 reissue of the band's catalogue, Robert Christgau said that "Stand! revealed the magnificence of which this band would all too briefly be capable. 'Sex Machine,' which precipitated James Brown's, wah-wahs on a bit, but everything else is etched in Stone, from the equally precipitous 'Don't Call Me Nigger, Whitey' to the Chaka Khan fave 'Somebody's Watching You' to, yes you can, 'You Can Make It If You Try.'" Also appraising the reissue campaign, Peter Shapiro wrote in Uncut that Stand! was "the group’s true breakthrough" as its "seamless blend of rock, funk and soul, and the soaring mix of black and white voices, made crossover seem like Utopia." Commenting on the music's historical context, Shapiro added:

At a time when the civil rights coalition was breaking apart, when flower power was mutating into armed struggle, the Family Stone clung desperately to the belief that 'You Can Make it If You Try' and had the gall to deliver the decade's most powerful message of unity as a singsong nursery rhyme. Of course, maybe 'Everyday People' was believable as a nursery rhyme because, on songs like 'Don’t Call Me Nigger, Whitey' and 'Somebody’s Watching You', Sly watches the '60s dream disintegrate before his eyes.

The Jackson 5 covered "Stand!" on their first Album Diana Ross Presents the Jackson 5 (1969), the song was used as a set opener for their 1970 and 1971 concert tours. A live version appears along with "I Want to Take You Higher" on their soundtrack album Goin' Back to Indiana (1971).

Primal Scream sampled "Sex Machine" on their cover of the 13th Floor Elevators' "Slip Inside This House" from their album Screamadelica (1991).

Rapper Ice-T, Body Count, and Jane's Addiction performed "Don't Call Me Nigger, Whitey" during the 1991 Lollapalooza tour and in the 1993 Perry Farrell film Gift.

== Track listing ==
All songs written, produced and arranged by Sly Stone for Stone Flower Productions.

=== Side one ===
1. "Stand!" – 3:08
2. "Don't Call Me Nigger, Whitey" – 5:58
3. "I Want to Take You Higher" – 5:22
4. "Somebody's Watching You" – 3:20
5. "Sing a Simple Song" – 3:56

=== Side two ===
1. "Everyday People" – 2:21
2. "Sex Machine" – 13:45
3. "You Can Make It If You Try" – 3:37

=== 2007 limited edition CD reissue bonus tracks ===
- "Stand!" (mono single version) - 3:08
- "I Want to Take You Higher" (mono single version) - 3:01
- "You Can Make It If You Try" (mono single version) - 3:38
- "Soul Clappin' II" (previously unreleased) - 3:26
- "My Brain (Zig-Zag)" (previously unreleased instrumental) - 3:19

== Personnel ==
Sly and the Family Stone

- Sly Stone – vocals, organ, guitar, piano, harmonica, vocoder; bass guitar on "You Can Make it if You Try"
- Rose Stone – vocals, piano, keyboards
- Freddie Stone – vocals, guitar
- Larry Graham – vocals, bass guitar (except on "You Can Make it if You Try")
- Greg Errico – drums, background vocals on "I Want to Take You Higher"
- Cynthia Robinson – trumpet, vocal ad-libs; background vocals on "I Want to Take You Higher"
- Jerry Martini – saxophone; background vocals on "I Want to Take You Higher"
- Little Sister (Vet Stone, Mary McCreary, Elva Mouton) – background vocals on "Stand!", "Sing a Simple Song", "Everyday People" and "I Want to Take you Higher"

Technical

- Don Puluse, Brian Ross-Myring, Phil Macey – engineering

== Chart history ==
=== Album ===
Name	Chart (1969–1970)	Peak position
Stand!	U.S. Billboard Pop Albums	13
Stand!	U.S. Top R&B Albums	3
Stand!	Australia (Kent Music Report)	9

"Everyday People"	U.S. Billboard Pop Singles	1
"Everyday People"	U.S. Billboard R&B Singles	1
"Sing a Simple Song"	U.S. Billboard Pop Singles	89
"Sing a Simple Song"	U.S. Billboard R&B Singles	28
"Stand!"	U.S. Billboard Pop Singles	22
"Stand!"	U.S. Billboard R&B Singles	14
"I Want to Take You Higher"	U.S. Billboard Pop Singles	38
"I Want to Take You Higher"	U.S. Billboard R&B Singles	24

=== Singles ===
- "Everyday People"
  - Epic single 10407, 1968; B-side: "Sing a Simple Song"
- "Stand!"
  - Epic single 10450, 1969; B-side: "I Want to Take You Higher"
  - Later reissued in 1970 with sides reversed.
