= Fresh (Sly and the Family Stone album) =

Studio album by Sly and the Family Stone
- Released: June 1973
- Recorded: 1972–73
- Studio: Record Plant (Sausalito, California)
- Genre: Funk; deep funk; progressive soul
- Length: 39:39
- Label: Epic
- Producer: Sly Stone

Sly and the Family Stone chronology
There's a Riot Goin' On (1971)	Fresh (1973)	Small Talk (1974)

Singles from Fresh
- 1. "If You Want Me to Stay" Released: 1973; 2. "Frisky" Released: 1973

Fresh is the sixth album by American funk band Sly and the Family Stone, released by Epic and CBS Records in June 1973. Written and produced by Sly Stone over two years, Fresh has been described as a lighter and more accessible take on the dense, drum machine-driven sound of its landmark 1971 predecessor There's a Riot Goin' On.

It was the band's final album to reach the US Top 10, entering the Billboard Album Chart on June 30, and their last of three consecutive number-one albums on the R&B chart. In 2003, the album was ranked number 186 on Rolling Stone magazine's list of the 500 greatest albums of all time.

== Recording and release ==
As with There's a Riot Goin' On, Fresh features prominent use of drum machine rhythms and groove-based compositions. Sly Stone's vocals on the album are frequently sped-up using Varispeed technology, resulting in an artificially raised pitch. As with Riot, Stone held on to the Fresh masters well beyond the record's official release, constantly remixing and re-recording the tracks.

The album's biggest hit was "If You Want Me to Stay". Other singles include "Frisky" and "Que Sera, Sera (Whatever Will Be, Will Be)", a cover of Doris Day's Academy Award-winning song from Alfred Hitchcock's 1956 film The Man Who Knew Too Much, sung here by Rose Stone. "Que Sera, Sera" is notable as the only cover song issued on an original Family Stone album. The cover photo is by Richard Avedon. The track "If It Were Left Up to Me" is purportedly an outtake from 1968's Life.

Alternate and significantly different versions of at least ten songs from the album are known to exist. In 1991, Sony Music, by then owner of the Epic catalog, accidentally issued a sequencing of Fresh on CD featuring alternate takes of every song except "In Time", which remained unchanged. Sony allowed the alternate version to remain in stores to be bought up by fans and then later issued the standard 1973 version of the album. However, the mix-up sparked debate among fans over which release was superior. When Sony BMG reissued Fresh in CD and digital download formats for Sly & the Family Stone's 40th anniversary, five alternate mixes were included as bonus tracks. These tracks are extremely similar, if not identical, to the alternate, accidental 1991 release. The alternate version is known to be very accessible in Japan, while it is very scarce in the U.S.

== Critical reception ==
Professional ratings
Review scores
Source	Rating
AllMusic	4/5 stars
Christgau's Record Guide	A
The Guardian	5/5 stars
Rolling Stone	4/5 stars
Stylus Magazine	B+
Uncut	5/5 stars

Fresh was met with positive reviews. Writing for Creem in 1973, Dave Marsh believed Stone is "coming to terms with himself as rock star" on an album that is among the richest from 1973, if not all time. He went on to predict the album would produce hits "because Sly, however great the contradictions he feels may be, is a truly great rock singer in the first place." In a review for Crawdaddy!, Vernon Gibbs found the music to be "quite worthy of the founder of progressive soul", saying it offers "plenty of ass-shaking rhythms for the present and reason for optimism about the future". Stephen Davis from Rolling Stone hailed Fresh as Stone's "masterpiece", "in its own sense, and on its own terms", and "a growing step for Sly — out of the murky and dangerous milieu that infused Riot and into a greater perspective on his own capacity to make music a positive form of communication". While crediting Stone for "open[ing] himself up lyrically" albeit for the sake of making commercial music, he found the album to be "both new and cheeky: It aims for honesty and decadence at the same time. It focuses on certain of his hassles while thoroughly entrancing his listener with the conjuring charms of the rhythms of black life. It's a bitch."

In a year-end list for Newsday, Robert Christgau ranked Fresh sixth among 1973's best albums. He later called the album "Riot-lite, which equated to minor funk classic" and said both Fresh and its predecessor are "easily [Stone's] best albums-as-albums".

== Legacy ==
Jazz legend Miles Davis was so impressed by the song "In Time" from the album that he made his band listen to the track repeatedly for a full 30 minutes. Composer and music theorist Brian Eno cited Fresh as having heralded a shift in the history of recording, "where the rhythm instruments, particularly the bass drum and bass, suddenly [became] the important instruments in the mix."

George Clinton, who has listed Fresh as one of his favorite albums, later convinced the Red Hot Chili Peppers to cover "If You Want Me to Stay" on their second 1985 album Freaky Styley, which was produced by him.

In 2003, the album was ranked number 186 on Rolling Stone magazine's list of the 500 greatest albums of all time, maintaining the rating in a 2012 revised list.

In 2006, Robert Randolph and the Family Band recorded a cover of "Thankful N Thoughtful" for their second studio album Colorblind.

== Track listing ==
All songs written, produced and arranged by Sylvester "Sly Stone" Stewart, except where noted.

Side one

1. "In Time" – 5:48
2. "If You Want Me to Stay" – 3:03
3. "Let Me Have It All" – 2:56
4. "Frisky" – 3:10
5. "Thankful N' Thoughtful" – 4:40

Side two

1. "Skin I'm In" – 2:53
2. "I Don't Know (Satisfaction)" – 3:51
3. "Keep on Dancin'" – 2:23
4. "Qué Será, Será (Whatever Will Be, Will Be)" (Ray Evans, Jay Livingston) – 5:20
5. "If It Were Left Up to Me" – 1:58
6. "Babies Makin' Babies" – 3:38
- Sides one and two were combined on CD reissues as tracks 1–11.

CD reissue bonus tracks

12. "Let Me Have It All" (alternate mix) – 2:19
13. "Frisky" (alternate mix) – 3:27
14. "Skin I'm In" (alternate mix) – 2:48
15. "Keep On Dancin'" (alternate mix) – 2:44
16. "Babies Makin' Babies" (alternate version) – 4:20

== Personnel ==
Sly and the Family Stone

- Sly Stone – vocals, organ, guitar, bass guitar, piano, harmonica, and more
- Freddie Stone – vocals, guitar
- Rose Stone – vocals, piano, keyboards
- Cynthia Robinson – trumpet
- Jerry Martini – saxophone
- Pat Rizzo – saxophone
- Rustee Allen – bass guitar on "If You Want Me to Stay", "In Time", "Let Me Have it All" and "Keep on Dancin'"
- Larry Graham – bass guitar on "Que Sera, Sera (Whatever Will Be, Will Be)" and "If It Were Left Up to Me" (uncredited)
- Andy Newmark – drums
- Little Sister (Vet Stone, Mary McCreary, Elva Mouton) – vocals

== Charts ==
=== Weekly charts ===
Chart (1973)	Peak positions
U.S. Billboard Pop Albums	7
U.S. Billboard Top Soul Albums	1
Canadian RPM Albums Chart	17

Chart (2007)	Peak positions
Japanese Chart (Oricon)	84

=== Year-end charts ===
Chart (1973)	Peak positions
U.S. Billboard Pop Albums	76
U.S. Billboard Top Soul Albums	17

== See also ==
- List of Billboard number-one R&B albums of 1973
