= I'm Just Like You: Sly's Stone Flower 1969–70 =

Compilation album by various artists
- Released: 2014
- Recorded: 1969–1970
- Label: Light in the Attic Records LITA 121 in 2014
- Producer: Sly Stone

I'm Just Like You: Sly's Stone Flower 1969–70 is a 2014 compilation album that features Sly Stone's production work for his Stone Flower label from 1969 to 1970.

== Background ==
The album I'm Just Like You: Sly's Stone Flower 1969–70 was released on Light in the Attic Records LITA 121 in 2014. It is an example of the output of Sly Stone's production work for his Stone Flower record label. The label's run was brief. Artists on the album are Little Sister, Sly Stone, Joe Hicks and 6ix.

The album was also issued in the double vinyl LP format.

== Reception ==
Calling the album "A lost chapter from the funk master's golden era", Will Hermes of Rolling Stone also wrote that the rare tracks on the album constituted a lost solo set from Sly Stone's peak and the other star on the album was the Maestro Rhythm King MRK-2 drum machine. The album was given three-and-a-half stars. The review was published on 21 October 2014.

In his cover of the album, Randall Roberts of the Los Angeles Times wrote that the drum machine tracks were most striking on the collection.

Nate Patrin of Pitchfork wrote that the album "doubles as the clearest available sonic roadmap for one of the most radical transformations in pop history". Patrin gave it an 8.1 rating.

The album was at No. 6 on the Rolling Stone 20 Best Issues of 2014 which was published on 18 December 2014.

The Vinyl Factory review was published on 31 May 2016. The album was one of the Sly Stone / Sly and the Family Stone records in the review. Looking at the period between Stone's two biggest statement albums and calling the music "somewhere between good and fantastic", the reviewer also wrote that it was a side route into examining his creative process for that period.

In its 2021 assessment of the album, Aquarium Drunkard wrote that the album possessed an "incredible lo-fi charm" and referred to the music as "would-be anthems, and drum machine laden soul".

Album notes writer Alec Palao was nominated for a Grammy Award in the Best Album Notes category for the 57th Grammy Awards.

== Track listing ==
1. Little Sister – "You're the One" (Parts 1 & 2), 5:25
2. Sly –" Just Like a Baby", 4:02
3. Joe Hicks – "Home Sweet Home" (Part 2), 3:01
4. 6ix – "I'm Just Like You", 3:08
5. Little Sister – Somebody's Watching You (Full band version), 3:51
6. Joe Hicks – "Life & Death in G & A (Parts 1 & 2) 5:59
7. 6ix – "Trying to Make You Feel Good", 5:52
8. Little Sister – "Stanga", 3:43
9. 6ix – "Dynamite", 3:10
10. Little Sister – "You're the One" (Early version), 2:54
11. Sly – "Africa", 7:43
12. Joe Hicks –"I'm Goin' Home" (Part 1), 2:58
13. Little Sister – "Somebody's Watching You", 2:57
14. 6ix – "You Can, We Can", 5:33
15. Sly – "Spirit", 3:00
16. 6ix – "I'm Just Like You" (Full band version), 6:14
17. Sly – "Scared", 5:31
18. 6ix – "Dynamite (Alternate version)", 3:42
