= Sing a Simple Song =

Single by Sly and the Family Stone

from the album Stand!
- A-side: "Everyday People"
- Released: 1968
- Recorded: 1968
- Genre: Funk
- Length: 3:57
- Label: Epic; 5-10407
- Songwriter: Sly Stone
- Producer: Sly Stone

Sly and the Family Stone singles chronology
"Life" / "M'Lady" (1968)	"Everyday People" / "Sing a Simple Song" (1968)	"Stand!" / "I Want to Take You Higher" (1969)

"Sing a Simple Song" is a 1968 song by the soul-funk band Sly and the Family Stone, the B-side to their number 1 hit "Everyday People". The song is sung in turn by Sly Stone, Freddie Stone, Rose Stone, and Larry Graham, with shouted spoken word sections by Cynthia Robinson. As with nearly all of Sly and the Family Stone's songs, Sly Stone was credited as the sole songwriter.

The song is one of Sly and the Family Stone's signature songs, and has been covered by a number of acts, including Dusty Springfield, Diana Ross & the Supremes, The Temptations, The Jackson 5, The Commodores, Miles Davis, The Meters, Booker T. & the M.G.'s, Prince, The Budos Band, Maceo Parker and others.

It has also been sampled by numerous artists, including Ike & Tina Turner, 2Pac, Jodeci, Wu-Tang Clan, Public Enemy, De La Soul, Digital Underground ("Humpty Dance"), Cypress Hill, Gorillaz, Arrested Development, Backstreet Boys, Spice Girls, Alanis Morissette, and Adina Howard. Jimi Hendrix plays the song's main riff on "We Gotta Live Together" from his 1970 live album Band of Gypsys. The song's "yah-yah-yah" refrain was referenced in The Illusion's 1969 hit "Did You See Her Eyes".

The song's title is referenced in the band's 1969 hit "Thank You (Falettinme Be Mice Elf Again)."

== Personnel ==
- Sly Stone - co-lead vocals, organ, composer, producer
- Jerry Martini - tenor saxophone
- Cynthia Robinson - trumpet
- Freddie Stone - guitars, co-lead and backing vocals
- Rose Stone - piano, co-lead and backing vocals
- Larry Graham - bass, co-lead and backing vocals
- Greg Errico - drums
- Little Sister (Vet Stone, Mary McCreary, Elva Mouton) - backing vocals

== Samples ==
This is not an exhaustive list; a more comprehensive list can be found here.

- 2Pac ("Peep Game", "Souljah's Revenge", "Temptations", "Young Niggaz")
- Adina Howard ("Freak Like Me")
- Alanis Morissette ("Thank U")
- Arrested Development ("Mr. Wendal", "Revolution")
- Backstreet Boys ("Boys Will Be Boys")
- De La Soul ("Eye Know")
- Digital Underground ("The Humpty Dance", "The Return Of The Crazy One", "Your Life's A Cartoon")
- Domino (Getto Jam, Sweet Potato Pie)
- Dr. Dre ("Deep Cover")
- Gorillaz ("19-2000 (Soulchild Remix)")
- KRS-ONE ("Sound of Da Police")
- Main Source ("Watch Roger Do His Thing")
- MC Zappa ("Hardcore", "Video Dames")
- Pete Rock & C.L. Smooth ("Anger In The Nation", "For Pete's Sake")
- The Pharcyde ("I'm That Type Of Nigga")
- Eazy E ("Eazy-Duz-It")
- Public Enemy ("Can't Do Nuttin' For Ya Man (Dub Mixx)", "Can't Truss It", "Fight The Power", "Frankenstar", "Get The Fuck Outta Dodge", "Hit Da Road Jack", "Tie Goes To The Runner")
- Stetsasonic ("It's In My Song")
- TLC ("Ain't 2 Proud 2 Beg (Left Eye's 3 Minutes And Counting", "What About Your Friends")

== See also ==
- Sly and the Family Stone discography#Other charted songs
