= Stand! (song) =

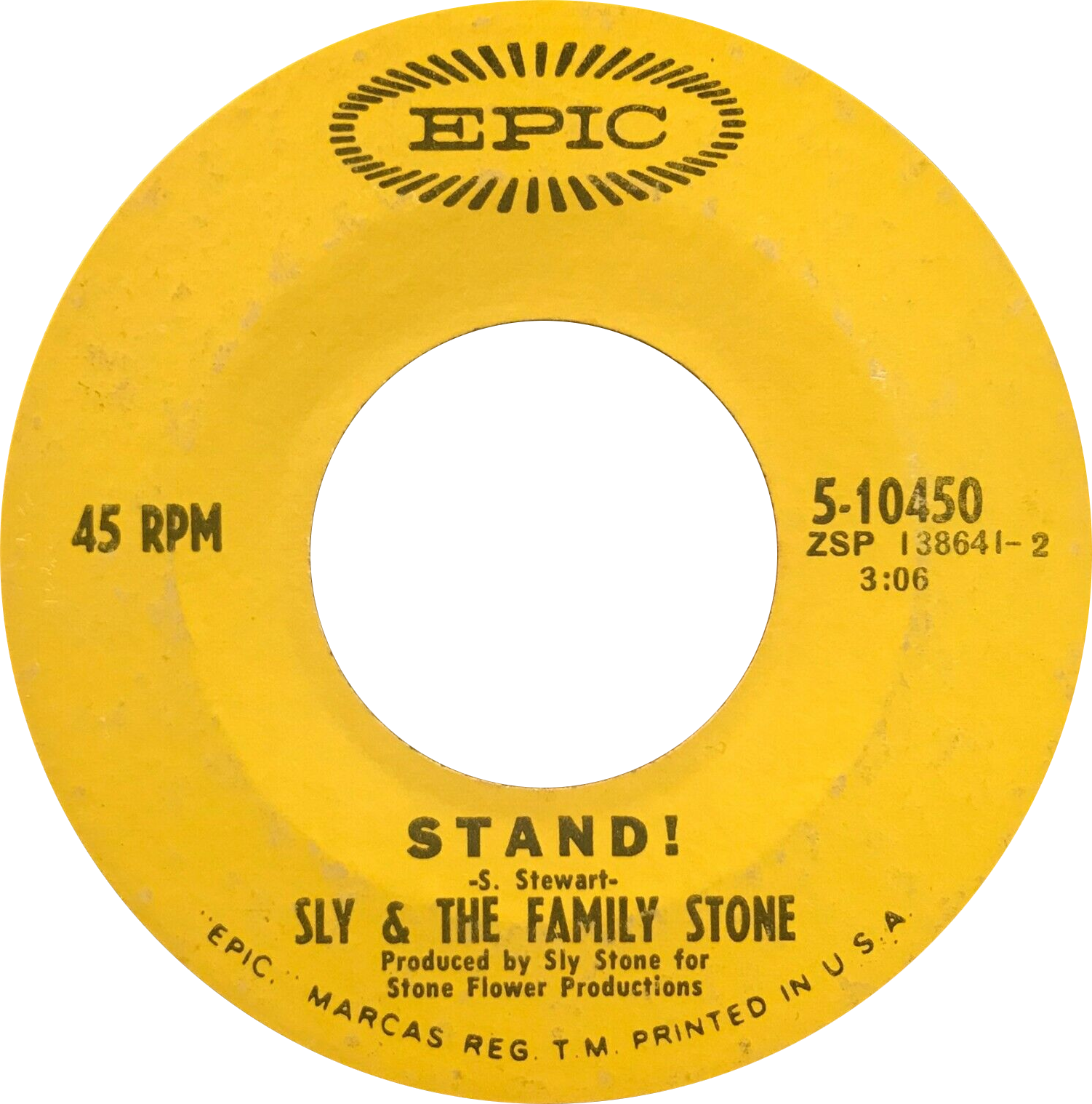
- Side A of the US single

Single by Sly and the Family Stone

from the album Stand!
- B-side: "I Want to Take You Higher"
- Released: March 1969
- Recorded: February 27, 1969
- Genre: Psychedelic soul, funk
- Length: 3:08
- Label: Epic
- Songwriter: Sly Stone
- Producer: Sly Stone

Sly and the Family Stone singles chronology
"Everyday People" / "Sing a Simple Song" (1968)	"Stand!" / "I Want to Take You Higher" (1969)	"Hot Fun in the Summertime" (1969)

Audio sample
- "Stand!": file; help

Audio video
- "Stand!" on YouTube

"Stand!" is a 1969 song by the soul/rock/funk band Sly and the Family Stone Issued as a single that year by Epic Records, it reached number 22 on the Billboard Hot 100 and number 14 on the Hot Soul Songs charts.

== Overview ==
The song's title and lyrics are a call for its listeners to "stand" up for themselves, their communities, and what they believe in. Like nearly all of Sly & the Family Stone's songs, Sylvester "Sly Stone" Stewart was credited as the sole songwriter.

The original mix of "Stand!" garnered a warm, yet unenthusiastic, reaction when Sly Stone had an early acetate of the record played in a San Francisco club. As a result, Stone went back into the studio and had the song's final section, a fevered gospel music-styled break, rerecorded. Most of the Family Stone was unavailable for the session, and Stone resorted to using mostly studio musicians for the rerecorded section.

"I Want to Take You Higher", the b-side of "Stand!", was also a hit single in 1969/1970.

In 2004 the song was ranked #241 on Rolling Stone's list of the 500 Greatest Songs of All Time.

== Personnel ==
- Sly Stone – vocals, organ
- Rose Stone – vocals, piano
- Freddie Stone – vocals, guitar
- Larry Graham – vocals, bass guitar
- Greg Errico – drums
- Cynthia Robinson – trumpet
- Jerry Martini – saxophone
- Little Sister (Vet Stone, Mary McCreary, Elva Mouton) – background vocals

== Cover versions ==
- In 1971, Solomon Burke covered the song on Electronic Magnetism
- Lonnie Smith included a instrumental version on his 1971 album Mama Wailer.
- The Jackson 5 covered the song on their debut album, Diana Ross Presents The Jackson 5, with it also being the opening song from their first and second tours. It was later released on Goin' Back to Indiana and it was used in the biopic Michael (2026 film)
- Liquid Jesus recorded the song for the film Pump Up the Volume.
- In 1991, the Minneapolis-Saint Paul-based ensemble Sounds of Blackness included a version of "Stand!" on their debut album, The Evolution of Gospel.
- In 1995, Pedro Aznar recorded a Spanish version of the song on his album David y Goliath.
- In 1997, Christian rock band Geoff Moore & The Distance covered the song as a hidden track on their "Threads" album.
- Kathy Troccoli has also released a cover of the song on her album "K.T.'s Groovy Medleys"
- Tony! Toni Tone! released a cover on the CD Panther released in 1995.
- Phish covered the song in concert on June 13, 1997, at SFX Hall in Dublin.
