= David Kapralik =

American A&R executive

- Born: Circa 1926; Plainfield, New Jersey
- Died: 2017; Maui, Hawaii
- Occupations: A&R executive, music producer, talent manager, club owner

David Kapralik was a music industry executive. An A&R executive, producer and talent manager, he was also a manager who at times managed Van McCoy and Sly & the Family Stone.

== Background ==
Kapralik brought Sly & the Family Stone to Epic records. He also co-formed Stone Flower Productions with Sly Stone, a company that was jointly owned by both of them.

He was also responsible for getting Barbra Streisand signed to Columbia Records. Some of the other artists that had a leg up from Kapralik were Bob Dylan, Aretha Franklin, Steve Lawrence & Eydie Gormé, Peaches & Herb, and Andy Williams. In addition to helping Tommy Mottola at an early stage in his career, he worked as a producer. He produced novelty record albums for Bette Davis and Cassius Clay.

== Career ==
In 1963, Kapralik was the head of the A&R department for Columbia. It was year prior to when Cassius Clay would knock out Sonny Liston when Clay had been signed up by Kapralik to record his I Am the Greatest comedy record album. The amount that Clay was signed up for was speculated to be around $25,000.

April Blackwood period

In October 1964, Billboard ran an article about David Kapralik and the April-Blackwood publishing company. Kapralik stepped into the role of General Manager around February that year. One of the tasks he completed was putting together a stable of composers which consisted of Herb Weiner, John Gluck, Dick Heard, Alan Jeffries, Van McCoy, and Herb Weiner. By mid-January, 1965, Kapralink had resigned from his position of General Manager at April Blackwood. Gerald Teifer stepped into the position. Kapralink had business interests in the Virgin Islands and wanted to concentrate on his recently opened supper club, The Loft which was located there. He also wanted to stay in the music business with a company that would handle publishing, personal management and record production. By February, he had visits from performers such as Barbra Streisand. He was also planning to an event under his direction with the island's governor to present Tony Bennett at a concert to be held at St. Thomas Ball Park.

Further activities

In 1965, Kapralik brought Van McCoy to the attention of Columbia vice-president, William P. Gallagher. This resulted in Columbia taking on McCoy as a recording artist. The signing to Columbia would impact on McCoy's intended marriage to singer Kendra Spotswood. He delayed their wedding plans to take on the contract and the relationship ended.

Kapralik produced the Peaches & Herb 1967 single, "Close Your Eyes" which became a US R&B #4 Hit and a US #8 pop Hit.

Kapralik was working as an A&R man for Epic. After an early Sly & the Family Stone album failed to make headway, Kapralik gave advice to Sly Stone that he should make simpler music. Taking the advice of Epic's A&R man Kapralik, Stone came back with Dance to the Music.

Stone Flower period

Having founded the production company, Stone Flower Music, Inc. with Sly Stone in 1967, Kapralik and Stone founded Stone Flower Records in 1969. Kapralik's job included seeking out new talent and singing them to the label. The acts that would record for the label were Little Sister, Joe Hicks and 6ix. 6ix was a group that was made up of members, Dale Radcliff, Paul Stallworth, Del Riker, Chuck Higgins, Gil Bottliiglieri, and Marvin Baxter. It was Kapralik who named them as such, having been inspired by a Bank of America commercial. According to bandmember Paul Stallworth, 6ix was a group that wasn't based on any particular person. It was basically an image or what Kapralik wanted to see in a band.

== Personal life ==
Kapralik was born in Plainfield, New Jersey to parents Samuel and Gertrude. The only son, he was the youngest of three children. He had two older sisters.

== Death ==
Kapralik died in Maui, Hawaii, in July 2017 at age 91.
