= Thank You (Falettinme Be Mice Elf Agin) =

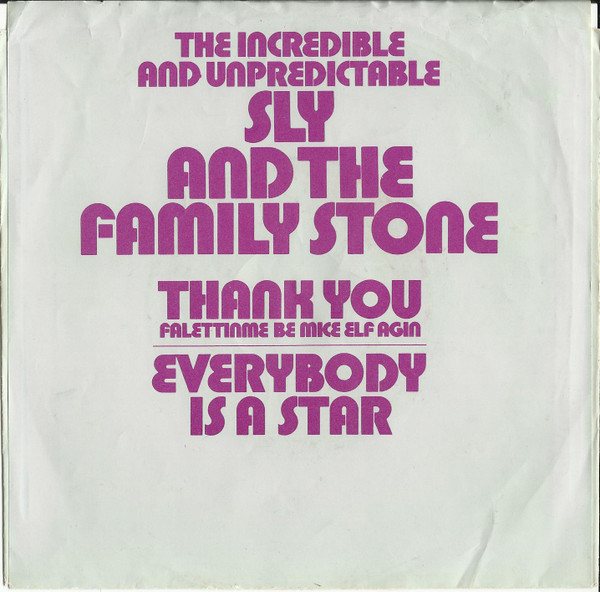
- Front sleeve of the US single

Single by Sly and the Family Stone

from the album Greatest Hits
- B-side: "Everybody Is a Star"
- Released: December 1969
- Recorded: 1969
- Genre: Funk
- Length: 4:50
- Label: Epic
- Songwriter: Sylvester Stewart
- Producer: Sly Stone

Sly and the Family Stone singles chronology
"Hot Fun in the Summertime" (1969)	"Thank You (Falettinme Be Mice Elf Agin)" / "Everybody Is a Star" (1969)	"Family Affair" (1971)

Music video
- "Thank You (Falettinme Be Mice Elf Agin)" (audio) on YouTube

Audio sample
- file; help

"Thank You (Falettinme Be Mice Elf Agin)" is a 1969 song recorded by Sly and the Family Stone. The song was released as a double A-side single with "Everybody Is a Star", and in February 1970 it reached number one on both Billboard's soul singles chart — where it stayed for five weeks — and the Hot 100, where it stayed for two weeks. The single ranked No. 5 for the year on the soul chart and No. 19 for the year on the Hot 100 chart.

== Background ==
The title is an intentional mondegreen or sensational spelling for "thank you for letting me be myself again." The third verse contains specific references to the group's previous successful songs: "Dance to the Music", "Everyday People", "Sing a Simple Song" and "You Can Make It If You Try". The song features co-lead vocals from Sly Stone, Rose Stone, Freddie Stone, Cynthia Robinson, Jerry Martini, Greg Errico and Larry Graham. On this song, Graham was widely credited with introducing the slap technique on the electric bass, which is heard prominently throughout the track.

"Thank You" was intended to be included on an in-progress album with "Everybody Is a Star" and "Hot Fun in the Summertime"; but the LP was never completed, and the three tracks were instead included on the band's 1970 Greatest Hits LP. "Thank You" and "Everybody Is a Star" were the final Family Stone recordings issued in the 1960s and marked the beginning of a 20-month gap of releases from the band, which would finally end with the release of "Family Affair" in 1971.

The song's length on the original hit single and the Greatest Hits LP is 4:48 and was re-channeled to simulate stereo on the popular Greatest Hits LP. The 1971 quadraphonic release of the Greatest Hits LP did use a true 4-channel remix of the song, however. The previously unreleased full-length version (6:18) was mixed by Bob Irwin in true stereo and its only issue for 35 years was on a 1990 Columbia promotional CD Legacy: Music for the Next Generation until it was included on the soundtrack for Sly Lives! (aka The Burden of Black Genius) in 2025. On the subsequent (and available as of 2015) The Essential Sly & The Family Stone 2-CD set, the track is in stereo but is the standard 4:48 length hit version.

== Release and reception ==
The song was ranked number 410 on Rolling Stone magazine's "500 Greatest Songs of All Time" in 2010. Janet Jackson's 1989 signature song "Rhythm Nation" is based on a guitar sample from the song.

The song was followed by a re-working on the closing track, "Thank You for Talkin' to Me, Africa", from the group's subsequent 1971 album, There's A Riot Goin' On.

In 1980, British post punk outfit Magazine released a cover version of the song, produced by Martin Hannett, and included it on their 1980 live album Play.

British hip-hop group Big Brovaz recorded a version for the soundtrack of the 2004 film Scooby-Doo 2: Monsters Unleashed.

In 2017, the song was inducted into the Grammy Hall of Fame.

== Personnel ==
- Sly Stone – co-lead vocals, guitar, writer, producer
- Rose Stone – co-lead vocals
- Jerry Martini – tenor saxophone and co-lead vocals
- Cynthia Robinson – trumpet and co-lead vocals
- Freddie Stone – guitar, co-lead vocals
- Larry Graham – bass, co-lead vocals
- Greg Errico – drums and co-lead vocals

== Certifications ==
Region	Certification	Certified units/sales
United States (RIAA)	Platinum	1,000,000^{‡}
^{‡} Sales+streaming figures based on certification alone.

== See also ==
- List of Billboard Hot 100 number ones of 1970
- List of Best Selling Soul Singles number ones of 1970
