= Hot Fun in the Summertime =

1969 single by Sly and the Family Stone

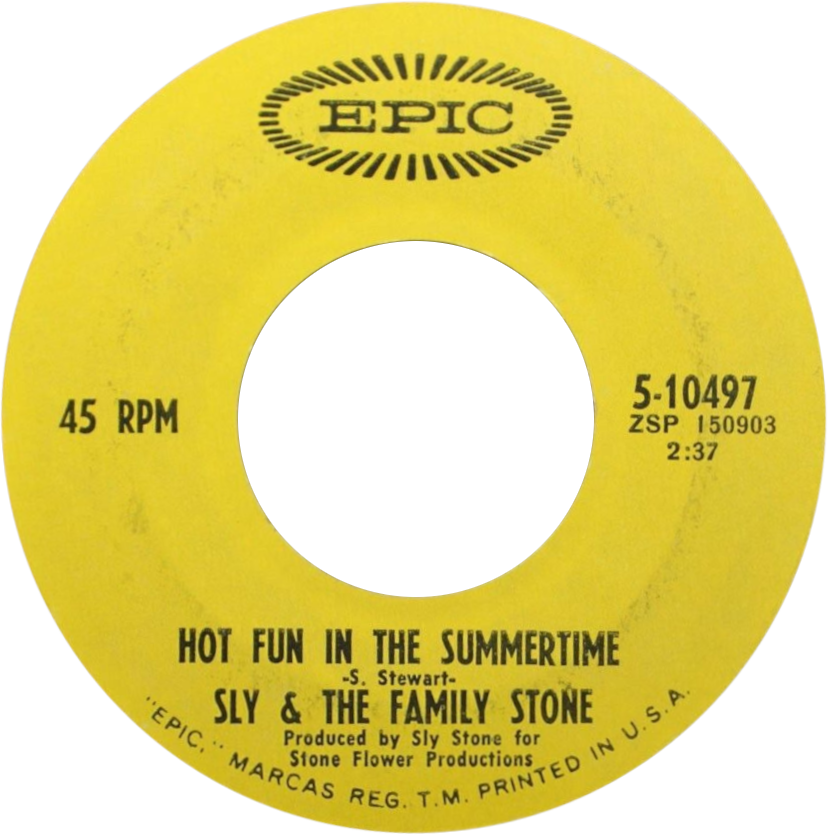
- Side A of the US single

Single by Sly and the Family Stone

from the album Greatest Hits
- B-side: "Fun"
- Released: July 21, 1969
- Recorded: 1969
- Genre: Psychedelic soul; funk
- Length: 2:37 (mono single version & stereo album version)
- Label: Epic; 5-10497
- Songwriter: Sly Stone
- Producer: Sly Stone

Sly and the Family Stone singles chronology
"Stand!" / "I Want to Take You Higher" (1969)	"Hot Fun in the Summertime" / "Fun" (1969)	"Thank You (Falettinme Be Mice Elf Agin)" / "Everybody is a Star" (1969)

Music video
- "Hot Fun in the Summertime" (audio) on YouTube

"Hot Fun in the Summertime" is a 1969 song recorded by Sly and the Family Stone. The single was released just prior to the band's high-profile performance at Woodstock, which greatly expanded their fanbase. The song peaked at number 2 on the U.S. Billboard Hot 100 singles chart, kept out of the number 1 spot by "I Can't Get Next to You" by the Temptations. "Hot Fun in the Summertime" also peaked at number 3 on the U.S. Billboard Soul Singles chart in autumn 1969. It is ranked as the seventh biggest U.S. hit of 1969, and the 65th in Canada.

Rolling Stone ranked the song #247 on their list of the "500 Greatest Songs of All Time", and it has also been named in lists by Yahoo! Music and AskMen as an all-time "summer anthem."

== Background ==
Thematically, "Hot Fun in the Summertime" is a dedication to the fun and games to be had during the summer. "Hot Fun in the Summertime" was intended to be included on an in-progress album with "Everybody Is a Star" and "Thank You (Falettinme Be Mice Elf Agin)"; the LP was never completed, and the three tracks were instead included on the band's 1970 Greatest Hits LP. This song is known for its rare use of strings in a Sly and the Family Stone song, featuring violins being played in the upper register.

The B-side to this single is "Fun," a song taken from the group's third album (Life) from 1968.

== Chart performance ==
=== Weekly charts ===
Chart (1969)	Peak position
Canada Top Singles (RPM)	4
US Billboard Hot 100	2
US Hot R&B/Hip-Hop Songs (Billboard)	3
US Cash Box Top 100	6

=== Year-end charts ===
Chart (1969)	Rank
Canada	65
U.S. Billboard Hot 100	7
U.S. R&B (Billboard)	8
U.S. Cash Box Top 100	60

== Certifications ==
Region	Certification	Certified units/sales
United States (RIAA)	Gold	500,000^{‡}
^{‡} Sales+streaming figures based on certification alone.

== The Beach Boys version ==
"Hot Fun in the Summertime"

Single by The Beach Boys

from the album Summer in Paradise
- B-side: "Summer of Love"
- Released: July 14, 1992
- Recorded: late 1991 – mid 1992
- Genre: Rock
- Length: 3:29
- Label: Brother Records
- Songwriter: Sly Stone
- Producer: Terry Melcher

The Beach Boys singles chronology
"Problem Child" (1990)	"Hot Fun in the Summertime" (1992)	"I Just Wasn't Made for These Times" (1996)

The track was covered by the Beach Boys on their 1992 album Summer in Paradise. The song was also released as a single during that same year, backed with "Summer of Love." A video was made to accompany the song.

=== Chart history ===
Chart (1992)	Peak position
Canada Top Singles (RPM)	66
US Adult Contemporary (Billboard)	17
US Gavin Report Adult Contemporary	10
US Radio & Records Adult Contemporary	13

== Other covers ==
It was performed on stage in HBO's 1981 television special The Pee-wee Herman Show.

The song was covered by The Party, which was originally supposed to be on their 1992 album, Free, but was then released on their 1993 album, "The Party's Over...Thanks For Coming".

It was covered in 1982 with somewhat greater chart success by a funk outfit known as Dayton, and again in 1995 by The Manhattan Transfer featuring vocals by Chaka Khan.

Genesis vocalist and drummer Phil Collins cited the song as one of the musical inspirations for "Misunderstanding". The members of Toto have also cited it as an inspiration for "Hold the Line".

Dave Koz and Friends (Gerald Albright, Mindi Abair and Richard Elliot) did an instrumental jazz cover on their 2013 collaboration album Summer Horns.

== Personnel ==
Sly and the Family Stone

- Sly Stone - vocals, piano
- Freddie Stone - vocals, guitar
- Larry Graham - vocals, bass guitar
- Rose Stone - vocals
- Cynthia Robinson - trumpet
- Jerry Martini - saxophone
- Greg Errico - drums
- Uncredited: Strings with violins in the upper register.
- Written and produced by Sly Stone
