= Everyday People =

Single by Sly and the Family Stone

from the album Stand!
- B-side: "Sing a Simple Song"
- Released: November 1968
- Recorded: 1968
- Genre: Rock; pop; psychedelic soul
- Length: 2:22
- Label: Epic; 5-10407
- Songwriter: Sly Stone
- Producer: Sly Stone

Sly and the Family Stone singles chronology
"Life" / "M'Lady" (1968)	"Everyday People" / "Sing a Simple Song" (1968)	"Stand!" / "I Want to Take You Higher" (1969)

Music video
- "Everyday People" on YouTube

Audio sample
- "Everyday People": file; help

"Everyday People" is a 1968 song composed by Sly Stone and first recorded by his band, Sly and the Family Stone. It was the first single by the band to go to No. 1 on the Soul Singles chart and the U.S. Billboard Hot 100 chart. It held that position on the Hot 100 for four weeks, from February 9 to March 8, 1969, and is remembered as one of the most popular songs of the 1960s. Billboard ranked it as the No. 5 song of 1969.

== Overview ==
The song is one of Sly Stone's pleas for peace and equality between differing races and social groups, a major theme and focus for the band. The Family Stone featured white members Greg Errico and Jerry Martini in its lineup, as well as female members Rose Stone and Cynthia Robinson; making it an early major integrated band in rock history. Sly and the Family Stone's message was about peace and equality through music, and this song reflects the same.

Unlike the band's more typically funky and psychedelic records, "Everyday People" is a mid-tempo number with a more mainstream pop feel. Sly, singing the main verses for the song, explains that he is "no better / and neither are you / we are the same / whatever we do."

Sly's sister Rose Stone and Cynthia Robinson sing bridging sections using the cadence of the "na-na na-na boo-boo" children's taunt, also known as the children's nursery rhyme Five Little Monkeys Swinging From a Tree. The chant mocks the futility of people hating each other for being tall, short, rich, poor, fat, skinny, white, black, or anything else. The bridges of the song contain the line "different strokes for different folks", which became a popular catchphrase in 1969 (and inspired the name of the later television series, Diff'rent Strokes). Rose's singing ends each part of the bridge with the words: "And so on, and so on, and scooby dooby dooby". (Note: The children's animated TV series Scooby-Doo (often featuring the phrase "scooby dooby doo") debuted on CBS in September 1969, seven months after “Everyday People” hit #1.)

During the chorus, all of the singing members of the band (Sly, Rosie, Larry Graham, and Sly's brother Freddie Stone) proclaim that "I am everyday people," meaning that each of them (and each listener as well) should consider himself or herself as parts of one whole, not of smaller, specialized factions.

Bassist Larry Graham contends that the track featured the first instance of the "slap bass technique", which would become a staple of funk and other genres. The technique involves striking a string with the thumb of the right hand (or left hand, for a left-handed player) so that the string collides with the frets, producing a metallic "clunk" at the beginning of the note. Later slap bass songs – for example, Graham's performance on "Thank You (Falettinme Be Mice Elf Again)" – expanded on the technique, incorporating a complementary "pull" or "pop" component.

The third verse of Sly and the Family Stone's 1969 "Thank You (Falettinme Be Mice Elf Agin)", a No. 1 hit by February 1970, references the titles of "Everyday People" and several of the band's other successful songs.

"Everyday People" was included on the band's album Stand! (1969), which sold over three million copies.

== Cover versions ==
Joan Jett covered the song for her 1983 album Album. Her version of the song peaked at No. 37 on the Billboard Hot 100 and No. 43 on the US Dance Club Songs charts.

Maroon 5 also recorded a cover of the song for a Sly and the Family Stone tribute album. Cher and Future covered the song for a 2017 Gap advertisement. The latter's duet later went viral on TikTok in 2025.

== Legacy ==
1970s Canadian rock group, Everyday People which was formed by Bruce Wheaton named themselves after the song. They recorded their version of "Everyday People" for B side of their single, "Don't Wait for Tomorrow".

Hip-hop group Arrested Development used the song as the basis of their 1992 hit, "People Everyday", which reached No. 2 on the UK singles chart and No. 8 on the Hot 100.

Rolling Stone ranked "Everyday People" as No. 145 on their list of the 500 Greatest Songs of All Time in 2004 and No. 109 on their updated list in 2021. It was listed on Billboard's 500 Best Pop Songs.

== Personnel ==
- Sly Stone – vocals
- Rose Stone – vocals, piano
- Freddie Stone – vocals, guitar
- Larry Graham – vocals, bass guitar
- Greg Errico – drums, background vocals
- Jerry Martini – saxophone, background vocals
- Cynthia Robinson – trumpet, vocal ad-libs
- Engineered by Don Puluse
- Written and produced by Sly Stone

== Charts ==
The song was ranked No. 5 on Billboard magazine's Top Hot 100 songs of 1969.

Chart (1968–1969)	Peak position
Canada RPM Top Singles	2
New Zealand (Listener)	10
UK Singles (Official Charts Company)	36
US Billboard Hot 100	1
US Hot R&B/Hip-Hop Songs (Billboard)	1

2025 chart performance for "Everyday People"
Chart (2025)	Peak position
Japan Hot Overseas (Billboard Japan)	15

== Certifications ==
Region	Certification	Certified units/sales
New Zealand (RMNZ)	Gold	15,000^{‡}
United Kingdom (BPI)	Silver	200,000^{‡}
United States (RIAA)	2× Platinum	2,000,000^{‡}
^{‡} Sales+streaming figures based on certification alone.
