= Stone Flower Records =

Stone Flower
- Parent company: Stone Flower Productions, Inc.
- Founder: Sly Stone, David Kapralik
- Status: Defunct
- Distributor: Atlantic
- Genre: Soul, funk
- Country of origin: United States
- Location: 1771 North Vine Street, Los Angeles, California, United States

Stone Flower was a record label founded by Sly Stone with David Kapralik. It served as an outlet for some of the artists that Stone had written for and produced.

== Background ==
The label was founded by Sly Stone and his manager David Kapralik in 1969. Its parent company was Stone Flower Music, Inc., a production company they had founded two years prior.

Stone was the head of A&R and had the responsibility of producing singles and albums for the label. Kapralik who had a twelve-year history with CBS / Columbia had the job of seeking out new talent and singing them to the label. The label had two locations. The Hollywood location was at 1771 North Vine Street, Los Angeles. This was the home office and Steve Topley; the director of national promotion worked from there. The other office was at 180 Madison Ave., New York. Barbara Baccus, the vice-president of administration was based at that location.

== History ==
It was reported in the 6 December 1969 issue of Record World that Stone Flower was one of the important record labels that Atlantic Records had entered into a distribution deal with. The other two were, San Francisco Records and Track Records. According to the magazine, a release from Stone Flower was expected in early January.

Little Sister recorded "You're the One" which was released on Stone Flower 9000. It was reviewed in the 7 February 1970 issue of Cash Box where it was one of the three Newcomer Picks. Having already broken in some markets the reviewer wrote that with the "peculiar rhythmic drive and hypnotic repetition", it should be a teen blockbuster.

As published in the 22 August 1970 issue of Billboard, Stone Flower had three places in the "Top Soul Records, Artists and Labels For 1st 6 Months of 1970" charts. "You're the One" was at No. 15 on the Top Soul Singles chart, Little Sister was at No. 25 on the Top Soul Singles Artists chart, and the Stone Flower label was at No. 25 on the Top Soul Singles chart.

6ix was a group that was made up of Dale Radcliff, Paul Stallworth, Del Riker, Chuck Higgins, Gil Bottliiglieri, and Marvin Baxter. Their name came from David Kapralik who had been inspired by a Bank of America commercial. According to band member Paul Stallworth, 6ix was a group that wasn't based on any particular person and was basically an image or what Kapralik wanted to see in a band. They had backed Little Sister for a period of time. released a single of their own, "I'm Just Like You" / "Dynamite" on the Stone Flower label in 1970. It was a Four-Star Single Pick in the 31 October issue of Record World. The reviewer wrote that the sound of the group was like Screamin' Jay Hawkins and Pink Floyd. There was also a question on how the name of the group should be pronounced.

Little Sister recorded "Somebody's Watching You" which was produced by Sly Stone. Backed with "Stanga", it was released on Stone Flower S-9001. The record debuted at No. 34 on the Record World Singles Coming Up chart for the week of 31 October. The song was a Four Star Pick in the 7 November issue of Record World. The reviewer referred to the single as perfect. It had also moved up to No. 26 on the Singles Coming Up chart that week. The following week, the single was at No. 18. The chart would then change its format and name. It was now the 101 to 150 Singles Chart, and "Somebody's Watching You" had moved from No. 118 to No 104. By 12 December, the single was in its second week on the Record World Singles Chart, having moved up from No. 96 to No. 89.

The last record released on the label was "Life and Death in G&A" in October 1970. According to Ed Ward in his article "Sly Stone: The Early Days In The East Bay" which was published on NPR on 18 August 2011, the record remained one of the most disturbing records he'd ever heard.

== Later years ==
In 2014, the I'm Just Like You: Sly's Stone Flower 1969–70 album was released on the Light in the Attic label. It featured releases by 6ix, Little Sister, Joe Hicks and Sly Stone. There were also ten unreleased tracks on the album. The album was reviewed by Randall Roberts of the Los Angeles Times in 2014.
