= Life and Death in G&A =

1969 song written by Sylvester Stewart

"Life and Death in G&A" aka "Life and Death in G & A" is a song written by Sylvester Stewart, also known as "Sly Stone". It has been recorded by Joe Hicks, Abaco Dream and Love Childs Afro Cuban Blues Band. Both Abaco Dream's and Love Childs Afro Cuban Blues Band's versions charted, performing best on the R&B/Soul-oriented charts, with critics praising both songs as well.

== Abaco Deam version ==
"Life and Death in G & A"
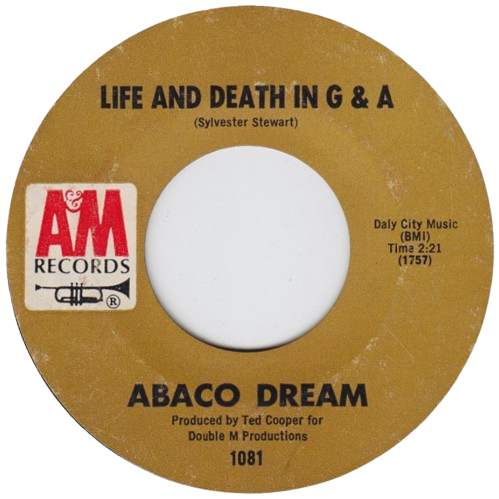

Song by Abaco Dream
- B-side: "Cat Woman"
- Released: August 1969
- Length: 2:21
- Label: A&M 1081
- Composer: Sylvester Stewart
- Producer: Ted Cooper

US chronology
"Life and Death in G & A" (1969)	"Another Night of Love" (1970)

=== Reception ===
According to Money Music in the August 9, 1969 issue of Record World, radio station WMCA was all out on the Abaco Dream single. The magazine also later wrote that the flip, "Cat Woman" was "groovy" and performed with "style", giving it a four-star rating. Billboard described it as a "Driving rocker with far out lyric line aimed right at the underground and Top 40 outlets," adding that it was "Loaded with sales appeal and chart activity."

=== Charts ===
The single eventually peaked at No. 74 on the Billboard Hot 100 and at No. 25 on the Billboard Hot Soul Singles chart in 1969. "Life and Death in G&A" was ranked higher on the Record World charts, reaching No. 61 on the 100 Top Pops and at No. 23 on the Top 50 R&B chart. The single also managed to climb to No. 58 on the Cashbox Top 100 Singles during a seven-week run on it. "Life and Death in G & A" reached No. 34 in Canada and the b-side "Cat Woman" was No. 66.

== Joe Hicks version ==
"Life and Death In G&A"

Song by Joe Hicks
- A-side: "Life and Death In G&A (Part I)"
- B-side: "Life and Death In G&A (Part II)"
- Released: 1970
- Length: 2:44
- Label: Stone Flower 45-9003
- Composer: Sylvester Stewart
- Producer: Sly Stone

Joe Hicks singles chronology
"Home Sweet Home Part II" (1969)	"Life and Death In G&A" (1970)	"Ruby Dean" (1973)

=== Background ===
Joe Hicks recorded "Life and Death In G&A". It was released as a single on Stone Flower 45-9003 with "Life and Death in G&A-Part II" as the A side. The B side was "Life and Death in G&A-Part I".

According to Ed Ward in his article "Sly Stone: The Early Days In The East Bay" which was published on NPR on 18 August 2011, Joe Hicks' version of "Life and Death in G and A" was one of the most disturbing records he'd ever heard. Hicks' version of the song is included on the I'm Just Like You: Sly's Stone Flower 1969–70 album. According to Sly Stone Music, "Life And Death In G&A" is "one of the bleakest moments Sly Stone ever created on disc".

== Love Childs Afro Cuban Blues Band version ==
"Life and Death in G&A"
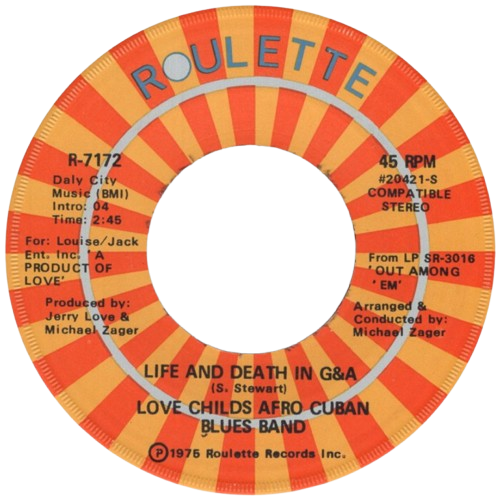

Song by Love Childs Afro Cuban Blues Band
- A-side: "Life and Death in G&A"
- B-side: "Bang Bang"
- Released: June 1975
- Genre: R&B; Disco
- Length: 2:45
- Label: Roulette R-7172
- Composer: S. Stewart
- Producers: Jerry Love & Michael Zager

Love Childs Afro Cuban Blues Band singles chronology
"Life and Death in G&A" (1975)	"Black Skin Blue Eyed Boys" (1975)

=== Background ===
Love Childs Afro Cuban Blues Band worked with producers Jerry Love and Michael Zager, and recorded their version of "Life And Death In G&A". Backed with "Bang Bang", it was released on Roulette R-7172 in 1975 as the band's debut single.

=== Reception ===
The single received a positive critical reception upon its release. Record World believed that the single is "already making it a renewed staple of the dance floor and soon to see it through to its charttoppin' due." Cashbox magazine stated that it had a "meaty rhythm section," with a "vibrant brass arrangement." They also noted that "The song is set into motion with strong vocals which come through to perk up the mostly instrumental track." Blues & Soul wrote that the "Heavy bass lines are cleverly accentuated by some excellent brass parts," adding that the song "Builds into a strong disco item as the girl chorus steps in to add a new dimension."

=== Charts ===
"Life and Death in G&A" debuted at No. 103 on the Billboard Bubbling Under the Hot 100 chart for the week of 5 July 1975, climbing to No. 48 on the Hot 100. It also debuted at No. 100 on the Billboard Hot Soul Singles chart that same week, peaking at No. 90 during its three-week total run on it.

== Other versions ==
The song was also recorded by Chairmen of the Board.
