= I Want to Take You Higher =

1969 single by Sly and the Family Stone

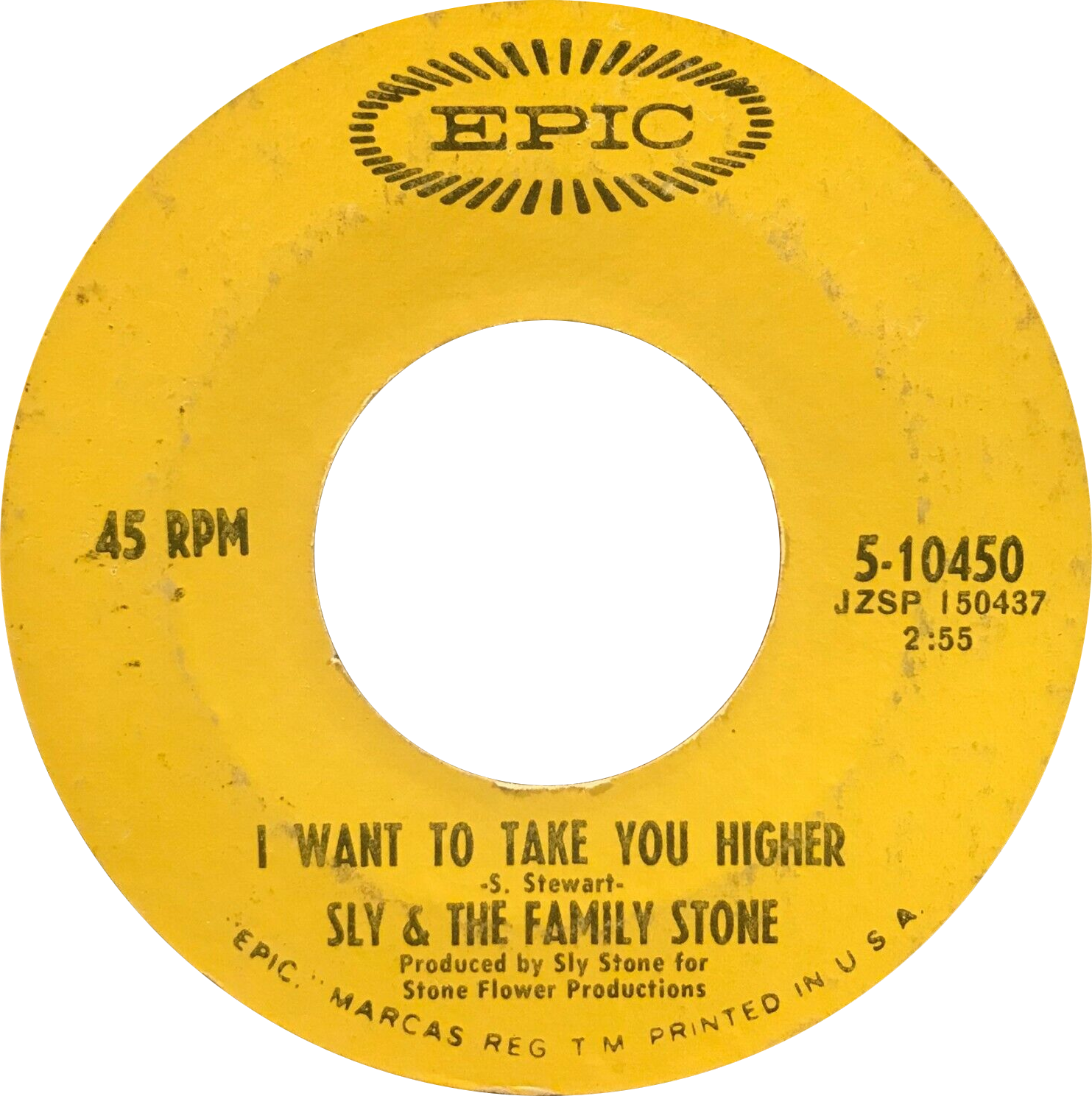
- Side B of the US single

Single by Sly and the Family Stone

from the album Stand!
- A-side: "Stand!"
- Released: March 1969 (B-side); March 1970 (A-side)
- Recorded: 1969
- Genre: Psychedelic soul; psychedelic funk
- Length: 5:23; 2:55 (single version)
- Label: Epic; 5-10450
- Songwriter: Sly Stone
- Producer: Sly Stone

Sly and the Family Stone singles chronology
"Everyday People" / "Sing a Simple Song" (1968)	"Stand!" / "I Want to Take You Higher" (1969)	"Hot Fun in the Summertime" (1969)

"I Want to Take You Higher" is a song by the soul/rock/funk band Sly and the Family Stone, the B-side to their top 30 hit "Stand!". Unlike most of the other tracks on the Stand! album, "I Want to Take You Higher" is not a message song; instead, it is simply dedicated to music and the feeling one gets from music. Like nearly all of Sly & the Family Stone's songs, Sylvester "Sly Stone" Stewart was credited as the sole songwriter.

== Composition ==
"I Want to Take You Higher" opens with a bluesy guitar riff played by Freddie Stone. The song, one of the most upbeat recordings in the Family Stone canon, is a remake of sorts of "Higher", a song from the band's 1968 Dance to the Music LP. "Higher" itself has its origins in "Advice", a song Sly Stone co-wrote and arranged for Billy Preston's album The Wildest Organ in Town in 1966.

== Performances ==
"Higher" made the setlist for the band's performance at Woodstock alongside "Dance to the Music" and "Music Lover"; Sly Stone used the song during a memorable interlude, during which he had the Woodstock crowd repeating, at three in the morning, the song's frantic cry of "higher!".

Sly & the Family Stone performed a medley of "Dance to the Music" and "I Want to Take You Higher" on Soul Train on June 29, 1974.

== Chart performance ==
Even though it was a B-side, "I Want to Take You Higher" became a top 40 hit (No. 38) of its own in 1970. That same year, Ike & Tina Turner released a cover of the song that became a hit as well, peaking above the original Family Stone recording on the Billboard Hot 100 (at No. 34), and one position below the original on the R&B singles chart.

== Legacy ==
The song was featured prominently in the classic Canadian children's show Hilarious House of Frightenstein. It was the theme song for the Wolfman character.

The song's chorus was referenced in the 1993 arcade game NBA Jam, where announcer Tim Kitzrow exclaims "Boomshakala!" when a player makes a slam dunk.

From May 10, 1997 through February 28, 1998, the Rock and Roll Hall of Fame and Museum presented their first temporary exhibit entitled I Want to Take You Higher: The Psychedelic Era 1965-1969, timed to correspond with the 30th anniversary of the Summer of Love. It opened with a day-long outdoor festival MC'd by Chet Helms that drew thousands to the Museum's plaza, featuring Big Brother and the Holding Company, Country Joe McDonald, and Donovan, with guests Ken Kesey and his Merry Pranksters (complete with the Further Bus). It accompanied the publishing of a book of the same name in 1997 (Chronicle Books) documenting the exhibit and the period. The last day featured an appearance by sixties icons Wavy Gravy and Paul Krassner, provided by the Cleveland-based group ACE.

In March 2005, Q magazine placed "I Want to Take You Higher" at No. 84 in its list of the 100 Greatest Guitar Tracks.

In 2008, Backbeat Books published the biography I Want to Take You Higher: The Life and Times of Sly & the Family Stone, by Jeff Kaliss, featuring a foreword and the first interview in twenty-one years with Sly Stone.

In 2014 it was used in the trailer for Inherent Vice.

== Personnel ==
- Sly Stone – lead and background vocals, harmonica, organ, songwriting & production
- Rose Stone – lead and background vocals, piano
- Freddie Stone – lead and background vocals, guitar
- Larry Graham – lead and background vocals, bass guitar
- Greg Errico – drums, background vocals
- Jerry Martini – tenor saxophone, background vocals
- Cynthia Robinson – trumpet, background vocals

== Charts ==
Chart (1969–1970)	Peak position
Canada (RPM 100)	24
US Billboard Hot 100	38
US Billboard R&B	24

== Ike & Tina Turner version ==
"I Want to Take You Higher"
- German picture sleeve

Single by Ike & Tina Turner & the Ikettes

from the album Come Together
- B-side: "Contact High"
- Released: May 1970
- Recorded: 1970
- Genre: Soul, funk rock
- Length: 2:51
- Label: Liberty Records
- Songwriter: Sly Stone
- Producer: Ike Turner

Ike & Tina Turner singles chronology
"Come Together" (1969)	"I Want to Take You Higher" (1970)	"Workin' Together" (1970)

The Ikettes singles chronology
"Make 'Em Wait" (1968)	"I Want to Take You Higher" (1970)	"Got What It Takes (To Get What I Want)" (1971)

In 1970, Ike & Tina Turner released a cover of "I Want to Take You Higher" which was also credited to the Ikettes. It was a top 40 hit, peaking at No. 34 on the Billboard Hot 100 chart and No. 25 on the Billboard R&B chart.

=== Charts ===
==== Weekly charts ====
Chart (1970)	Peak position
Canada (RPM 100)	36
US Billboard Hot 100	34
US Billboard R&B	25
US Cash Box Top 100	42
US Cash Box Top 50 R&B	21
US Record World 100 Top Pops	63
US Record World Top 50 R&B	24

==== Year-end charts ====
Chart (1970)	Rank
US Billboard Hot 100 singles	79

== Other versions ==
- Brian Auger & the Trinity covered the song as "I Wanna Take You Higher" on their 1970 album Befour.
- Kool & the Gang covered the song on their 1971 Live at the Sex Machine album.
- The Jackson 5 covered the song on their 1971 TV soundtrack album Goin' Back to Indiana.
- Randy Hansen covered the song on his eponymous LP released in 1980.
- Australian rock band Noiseworks recorded the song as "Take You Higher" with Michael Hutchence of INXS in 1991, for the third Noiseworks album Love Versus Money. Their version was released as a single in Australia.
- Marcella Detroit covered the song as a B-side to her 1994 single "I Believe", and later included it on her album Jewel. It was also released as a promotional 7" single from that album.
- Duran Duran recorded two versions for their 1995 covers album Thank You.
- Sonia Dada recorded "I Want to Take You Higher" for their 1999 live album Lay Down and Love it Live. Also released as a single, it did not chart.
- Tesla recorded a version for Real to Reel (2007).
- The guitar riff from the original version was sampled for "Woodstock Hood Hop", by Slaughterhouse featuring M.O.P., in 2009.
- Hanson covered the song on their Roots & Rock 'N' Roll EP in 2015.
- Toto covered the song on their album Live at Montreux 1991, released in September 2016.
- A cover of this song can be heard in the end credits sequence of the Bob's Burgers bonus episode "Into the Mild", first aired on June 11, 2017.
- Blues Traveler covered this song on the album Hempilation: Freedom Is NORML released in November 1995.
