= Joe Hicks (musician) =

American singer

- Origin: United States
- Genres: R&B, soul blues
- Occupation: Singer
- Years active: 1960s–1970s
- Labels: Stone Flower, Enterprise

Joe Hicks is an American R&B and soul blues singer and songwriter. He hailed from San Francisco, California, United States, and found limited success in the late 1960s and early 1970s. Hicks recorded an album for a subsidiary label of Stax Records.

== Career ==
His 1968 recording, "Don't It Make You Feel Funky", was produced by Pat Vegas and released by AGC Records; it later appeared on the 1995 compilation album, A Treasure Chest of Northern Soul. In 1969, backed by the Family Stone rhythm and horn section, he recorded the single, "I'm Goin' Home" b/w "Home Sweet Home - Part II", which was written and produced by Sly Stone, and released on the latter's Stone Flower label as well as the Scepter label. It was reported in the Money Music section of the 18 October issue of Record World that Scepter Records was all-out on "Home Sweet Home.

His joint compositions with Delaney Bramlett, "Sound of the City" and " I Know Something Good About You", were featured on Delaney & Bonnie & Friends' 1972 album, D&B Together. With Bobby Womack, Hicks co-wrote "Simple Man" and "Ruby Dean" (which both appeared on Womack's 1972 Understanding album), plus Womack's hit single, "That's The Way I Feel About Cha".

In 1973, Hicks recorded the album, Mighty Joe Hicks, which was released by Enterprise Records (a subsidiary label of Stax). It included the track, "Ruby Dean".

He is not to be confused with a similarly named, Missisissippi raised, Delta blues drummer and singer, who performed with the Fieldstones. Hicks is also not to be confused with a similarly named, English singer-songwriter, who has been releasing music since 2017.

== Later years ==
In 2014, the album, I'm Just Like You: Sly's Stone Flower 1969–70 was released. In addition to tracks by Sly Stone, Little Sister and 6ix, the tracks "Home Sweet Home (Part 2)", "Life & Death in G & A" and " I'm Goin' Home (Part 1)" by Hicks were included.

== Discography ==
=== Albums ===
Year	Title	Record label
1973	Mighty Joe Hicks	Enterprise

=== Singles ===
Year	A-side	B-side	Record label
1968	"Soul Meetin'"	"Don't It Make You Feel Funky"	AGC 0001 Records
1968	"I Gotta Be Free"	"Don't It Make You Feel Funky"	AGC 2 Records
1969	"I'm Goin' Home"	"Home Sweet Home - Part II"	Scepter / Stone Flower
1970	"Life and Death in G&A Part I"	"Life and Death in G&A - Part II"	Stone Flower
1973	"Ruby Dean"	"Train of Thought"	Enterprise
