= (You Caught Me) Smilin' =

1972 single by Sly and the Family Stone

Single by Sly and the Family Stone

from the album There's a Riot Goin' On
- B-side: "Luv N' Haight"
- Released: April 22, 1972
- Genre: Funk; soul; pop
- Length: 2:54
- Label: Epic
- Songwriter: Sylvester Stewart
- Producer: Sly Stone

Sly and the Family Stone singles chronology
"Runnin' Away" (1972)	"(You Caught Me) Smilin'" (1972)	"If You Want Me to Stay" (1973)

"(You Caught Me) Smilin'"
The minimalist soul song contains a horn-driven melody, raspy vocals and delicate keyboard lines.

"(You Caught Me) Smilin'" is a song by American band Sly and the Family Stone from their fifth studio album There's a Riot Goin' On (1971). It was released April 22, 1972 as the album's third single.

== Content ==
The song revolves around Sly Stone feeling sad and lost despite smiling. He is implied to be taking drugs to suppress his emotional pain.

== Critical reception ==
Reviewing There's a Riot Goin' On for AllMusic, Stephen Thomas Erlewine cited "(You Caught Me) Smilin'" as an instance of when "Sly's songwriting remains remarkably sharp". Stevie Chick of BBC Music described the song as "winningly vulnerable, a brief flash of joy".

== Charts ==
Chart (1972)	Peak position
US Billboard Hot 100	42
US Hot R&B/Hip-Hop Songs (Billboard)	21
