= You're the One (Little Sister song) =

You're the One was the debut single for the group Little Sister in 1970. Making its way into multiple charts, it became a hit for them that year.

== Little Sister version ==
"You're the One"

Single by Little Sister
- A-side: "You're the One Part 1"
- B-side: "You're the One Part 2"
- Released: 1970
- Genre: Funk
- Label: Stone Flower 45-9000
- Composer: S. Stewart
- Producer: Sly Stone

Little Sister singles chronology
"You're the One" (1970)	"Somebody's Watching You" (1970)

=== Background ===
It was produced by Sly Stone and released on the Stone Flower label. The single was predicted to chart by manufacturers in the February 14, 1970 issue of Billboard.

=== Charts ===
In the US the single made its debut at no. 86 on February 28, 1970, on the Billboard Hot 100 chart and peaked at no. 22.

Making its debut at no. 47 on the Billboard Best Selling Soul Singles chart on the week ending February 28, it peaked at no. 4 on the Billboard R&B chart.

In Canada it made its debut on the RPM chart at no. 85 on March 28, 1970. It peaked at no. 23 on week seven.

Chart summary 1970
Publication	Chart	Peak	Weeks on chart
Billboard (USA)	Hot 100	22	11
Billboard (USA)	Best Selling Soul Singles	4	13
RPM Weekly (Canada)	RPM 100	23	7

== Three Degrees version ==
"You're the One"

45 rpm single by The Three Degrees

from the album Maybe
- A-side: "You're the One"
- B-side: "Stardust"
- Released: 1970
- Length: 3:23
- Label: Roulette R-7097
- Songwriter: S. Stewart
- Producer: Richard Barrett

The Three Degrees singles chronology
"I Do Take You" (1970)	"You're the One" (1970)	"There's So Much Love All Around Me" (1970)

=== Background ===
The Three Degrees recorded a version of "You're the One". It was released on Roulette 7097 in 1971.

=== Reception ===
One of the Record World of the Week singles for the week of 26 December, it had a positive review with a high potential to register in the chart being noted.

It was reported in the 16 January 1971 issue of Record World that in spite of a large amount of radio airtime being devoted to holiday programming, Sonny Kirshen, the VP of sales and marketing for Roulette Records had noted major breakouts of two of the label's records. They were "You're the One" by the Three Degrees from their Maybe album and "I Love You for All Seasons" by The Fuzz. Due to the recent exposure of the group on television, the song was "surging" and the record had become a hot item with one-stops for juke box locations. With the momentum of the single, vendors had been motivated to stock the album and sales had increased.

=== Charts ===
The single debuted at No. 139 on the Record World 101 - 150 singles chart for the week of 26 December 1970.

The single debuted at No. 59 on the Record World R&B Singles chart for the week of 2 January 1971.
