= Mary McCreary =

American singer, pianist and composer

- Also known as: Mary Russell, Mary Rand
- Occupation: Singer
- Instruments: Vocals, piano
- Labels: MCA, Shelter Records, Philips, Paradise Records
- Formerly of: The Heavenly Tones, Little Sister, New Generation, Leon & Mary Russell

Mary McCreary is an American singer, pianist and composer. She has been a member of hit making recording acts, Little Sister and Leon & Mary Russell. She has recorded her own albums for the MCA and Shelter labels. As a session singer she has sung on a multitude of artists' recordings such as Sly & the Family Stone, Michael Bolotin, Melba Moore and Denny Laine.

== Background ==
Mary McCreary is a singer and musician who plays piano and did her own arrangements on her recordings.

In 1961, when she was aged ten, she sang on stage with the folk group the Limeliters, performing the song, "Run Little Donkey Run" which appeared on the group's album, Through Children's Eyes (Little-Folk Songs for Adults).

She was part of The Heavenly Tones and then later, Little Sister who had three hits in the early 1970s, "You're the One (Part 1)", "Somebody's Watching You" and "Stanga". After her time with Little Sister, McCrary joined the rock choir New Generation.

She was part of the duo, Leon & Mary Russell who had the hit "Rainbow in Your Eyes" in 1975 which got to no. 52 on the Billboard singles chart.

In 1973, she signed with Shelter Records and made her debut album with Butterflies in Heaven.

She is now known as Mary Rand.

== Career ==
=== 1973 ===
Butterflies in Heaven album

Her album Butterflies in Heaven was released in 1973. It was produced by D. J. Rogers and included the songs "My Soul Is Satisfied", "God Is Always Near", "Evil Woman" and "Butterflies In Heaven". She composed most of the songs and played piano on all except for one. Maxayn Lewis sang backup and Marlo Henderson played guitar on one track. It was reported by Billboard in the week ending July 7, 1973 Butterflies in Heaven was an FM action pick with airplay on WHCN.FM, one of the country's leading progressive radio stations. The following week it was an FM action pick on another leading progressive station, WNEW.FM.

Her single "Evil Woman" that she co-wrote with Lawrence Hill was produced by D. J. Rogers. It was reviewed in the First Time Around section of the July 28 issue of Billboard. Her powerful vocals and the piano playing were noted as well as the pop and soul audience potential.

Further activities

On August 5, she was appearing at the Oakland Alamedia County fair. She opened the concert at the Ontario Motor Speedway in Ontario, California that also featured Leon Russell and Loggins & Messina. The review of her performance in the August 11 issue of Billboard was favorable which noted her powerful vocals and good piano ability. She was appearing at the Schaeffer Stadium in Foxborough, Massachusetts on August 13, the Atlanta Stadium in Atlanta, Georgia on August 16 and at the American Legion Memorial Stadium in Charlotte, North Carolina on August 18.

Billboard reported in the September 29, 1973 issue that McCreary and Phoebe Snow were part of an experiment by Shelter Records in connection with Capitol for a four recorder, four camera video bus. Shelter president Denny Cordell was at the controls and Leon Russell was present.

=== 1974 ===
She composed the song "Singin' the Blues" which was released on Shelter 40217. It was backed with " High Flying Me". It was a recommended single in the May 11, 1974 issue of Billboard.. Eric Clapton covered the track on his album There's One in Every Crowd that was released in 1975.

Jezebel album

Her Jezebel album had already been released by November, 1974. It was mentioned in the November 9 issue of Billboard which noted a mix of material that drew from the soul, rock and reggae genres. The musicians that played on the album were Leon Russell, Chuck Rainey, Andy Newmark, Jose Feliciano, the Tower of Power and Charles Larkey.

On the week of November 9, the record was at no. 210 on the Billboard Bubbling Under The Top LP's chart that week. On the week ending October 19, it was sharing the no. 13 spot with Dragonfly by Jefferson Starship and Free Beer and Chicken by John Lee Hooker on the Billboard FM Action chart. On the week ending November 16, her album was at no. 209 on the Billboard Bubbling Under The Top LP's chart.

On the week of November 23, the album had made its debut at no. 188 on the Record World 151 - 200 New & Active chart. On the week of December 7, it was at no. 183 on the Record World 151 - 200 Album chart. With the chart now renamed as the 151-200 Album Chart, the record reached its peak position of 181 on the week of December 14. It was still in the chart at no. 195 on December 28.

Singles from album

She composed the song "Brother" which was released on Shelter SR-40327. Produced by Denny Cordell and Leon Russell, it was a recommended single in the Top Single Picks in the November 9 issue of Billboard. It was culled from the album. It was also reviewed by Cash Box that week. Her gutsy voice and the backing vocals that augmented her voice beautifully were noted. It was given chart movement potential. "Brother" was in the Record World Hits of the Week section for the week of November 23.

Further activities

She contributed her backing vocals to Tina Turner's album, Rough that was released in 1977.

In 1979, her album Heart of Fire was released on the Paradise label. It was credited to Mary Russell. It was reviewed in the March 3 issue of Record World. It received positive review with the quality of her musicianship and vocals were noted. The tracks "Body Music" and "Heart of Fire" were noted as potential for instant adds at BOS stations. It was also reviewed in the March 12 issue of Walrus. The drawing from classic R&B moves, pleasing tunes and solidity were noted but the singular sense of style was pointed out as a drawback. The magazine also reported that she was getting moderate airplay on WBAB in Long Island NY and was added to the playlist of KZEL in Eugene, Oregon. Cash Box reported that the album was added to the playlist of KRST-FM in Albuquerque. It was also recorded as an Album Breakout at Radio Doctors, the well-established record store in Milwaukee.

=== As Mary Rand ===
In 2005, she released her Still Together album and in 2015 she released Love & Praise, and Go Just Go.

== Personal life ==
She was married to Leon Russell and they had a son, Teddy Jack Willie John Russell Bridges. He is also a musician.
