= Little Sister (band) =

American vocal harmony group

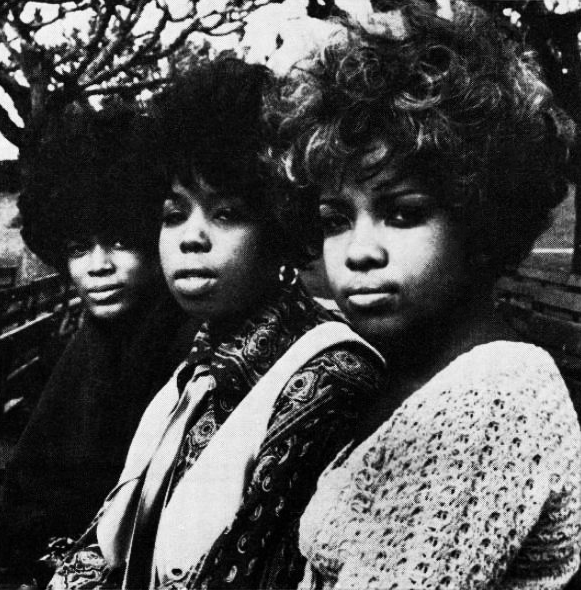
- Little Sister in 1970

Background information
- Origin: United States
- Genres: Funk; psychedelic soul
- Label: Stone Flower
- Past members: Vet Stewart; Mary McCreary; Elva Mouton; Lucy Hambrick

Little Sister was an American all-female vocal harmony group that served primarily as the background vocalists for the influential rock/funk band Sly and the Family Stone in concert and on record. Originally a gospel music group called the Heavenly Tones, Little Sister was composed of Vet Stewart (Family Stone frontman Sly Stone's younger sister), Mary McCreary, and Elva Mouton, and became a recording act of its own for a brief period in 1970–1971.

== Background ==
=== Formation ===
While still in high school, Vaetta Stewart and her friends Mary McCreary, Elva Mouton and Tramaine Hawkins had a gospel group called the Heavenly Tones and performed at various venues around the Oakland/San Francisco area. In 1966 they recorded the album I Love the Lord for the Gospel label, and a 45 for the Music City label called "He's Alright". When Vaetta's older brother Sylvester aka Sly Stone formed Sly and the Family Stone with their brother Freddie, and friends Larry Graham, Cynthia Robinson, Jerry Martini, and Greg Errico, the Heavenly Tones were recruited directly out of high school to become Little Sister, Sly & the Family Stone's background vocalists for their recording. Sly Stone got the group to tour with him but Hawkins declined as she wanted to finish school. The group then became Little Sister, which was made up of Vaetta Stewart, Mary McCreary, and Elva Mouton.

Tramaine Hawkins would later have a successful solo career.

=== Stone Flower ===
During the interim period between the releases of the Family Stone albums Stand! and There's a Riot Goin' On, Sly Stone negotiated a production deal with Atlantic Records, resulting in his own imprint, Stone Flower. Stone Flower released four singles, including one by R&B artist Joe Hicks, one by 6IX, and two by Little Sister: "You're the One" and "Somebody's Watching You", a cover of a song from Stand!.

== Career ==
For a period of time, Little Sister was backed by the group 6ix. 6ix did release a single of their own, "I'm Just Like You" / "Dynamite" on the Stone Flower label in 1970. It was a Four-Star Single Pick in the 31 October issue of Record World. Sometime later, Freddie Stone was preparing and coaching another band for Little Sister. This group was Lighthouse for the Blind which included future Sly & the Family Stone bassist, Rustee Allen. According to Allen, the idea for the group's name came from Freddie Stone.

Little Sister recorded the single "You're the One". It was reported in the 21 February issue of Record World that it had exploded on the pop play lists. The single also debuted at No. 96 in the Record World 100 Top Pops singles chart for that week.

=== Hit singles ===
Both Little Sister 45s reached the Billboard Hot 100 Top 40 and the Billboard R&B Top 10:

- "You're the One", part 1/"You're the One, part 2" made it to No. 4 R&B and No. 22 pop (2/28/70)
- "Somebody's Watching You" did quite well, peaking at no. 19 in the Top 60 in R and B Locations chart on the week of January 23, 1971, and peaking at no. 22 in the Cash Box Top 100 on the week of February 13, 1971. On Billboard, it reached no. 32 in the Hot 100 and peaked at no. 8 on the Billboard soul singles chart.
- "Stanga" made it to No. 8 R&B and No. 32 pop (11/28/70)

Eventually, Sly ceased production of further Little Sister recordings, and Little Sister were relegated to background vocal work for the rest of its existence. Atlantic flipped the 2nd single over and reserviced it and it charted, as well;

- "Stanga"/"Somebody's Watching You" made it to No. 44 R&B but did not chart again on the pop chart (2/19/72).

=== Later period ===
During the post-1971 period of Sly & the Family Stone, Mary McCreary left the group and began a solo career. She was replaced by Lucy Hambrick.

McCreary eventually married singer-songwriter Leon Russell and, with him, recorded Wedding Album in 1976 and Make Love to the Music in 1977. Little Sister continued to provide background vocals and perform live with Sly & the Family Stone. Little Sister was dissolved when the Family Stone did, in 1975, after the band's fortunes slowly fell due to Sly Stone's drug abuse problems.

== Members ==
- Vet Stewart
- Elva "Tiny" Mouton
- Mary McCreary
- Lucy Hambrick (replaced McCreary in 1972)

== Discography ==
=== Albums ===
- 1966: I Love the Lord by the Heavenly Tones

=== Singles ===
- 1966: "He's Alright" b/w "Precious Lord" by the Heavenly Tones (Music City)
- 1970: "You're the One (Part 1)" b/w "You're The One (Part 2)" (Stoneflower) (US No. 22, R&B No. 4)
- 1970: "Somebody's Watching You" b/w "Stanga" (Stoneflower) (US No. 32, R&B No. 8)
- 1972: "Stanga" b/w "Stanga" (radio promo release only) (Stoneflower) (US No. 44 R&B)
