= Somebody's Watching You =

1969 song by Sly and the Family Stone

Song by Sly and the Family Stone

from the album Stand!
- Released: 1969
- Recorded: 1968–1969
- Label: Epic
- Composer: Sylvester Stewart
- Producer: Sly Stone

"Somebody's Watching You"

Single by Little Sister
- B-side: "Stanga"
- Released: 1970
- Label: Stone Flower 45-9001
- Composer: Sylvester Stewart
- Producer: Sly Stone

Little Sister singles chronology
"You're The One-Part I & II" (1970)	"Somebody's Watching You" (1970)	"Stanga" (1970)

"Somebody's Watching You" is a song by Sly and the Family Stone. It was a single for Little Sister in 1970. It became a hit for the group and registered in the Billboard and Cash Box charts.

== Background ==
This single was a follow up to Little Sister's previous single, "You're the One". Composed by Sylvester Stewart, it was previously recorded by Sly and the Family Stone and appeared on the group's 1969 Stand! album

The recording by Little Sister was reviewed in the November 7, 1970 issue of Record World where it was a four star pick with the reviewer calling it "perfect". It was also at no. 26 in the magazine's Singles Coming Up chart that week.

The song made number 16 on the Cash Box Top Hits of the Year list.

"Stanga" charted as well and made it to no. 44 on the Billboard Soul chart.

== Airplay ==
The November 14 issue of Record World reported that the record was getting played on KATZ in St. Louis.

On the week of January 23, 1971, Record World reported the song at #13 on WAYS; #14 on WQXI; #8 on WBBQ ; #10 on KXOK ; #14 on WSAI; #24 on WRKO; and #11 on WHBQ. It was also on CKLW, WLS, KRLA, KHJ.

== Charts ==
=== Record World ===
For the week of October 31, 1970, the single debuted at no. 34 on the Record World Singles Coming Up chart. On November 14, the single was at no. 7 on the Record World One Stop Top Ten chart, Nor Cal (San Francisco) section. It also peaked at no. 7 on the Record World R&B chart on January 23, 1971.

=== Cash Box ===
On the week of November 28, the single made its debut in the Cash Box Looking Ahead chart at no. 28. It also debuted that week at no. 54 in the Cash Box Top 60 in R and B Locations chart.

On the week of December 5, and at is second week in the Looking Ahead chart, it got to no. 21. On the week of December 12, it made its debut at no. 78 in the Cash Box Top 100.

On the week of January 23, 1971, it peaked at no. 19 in the Top 60 in R and B Locations chart. On the week of February 13, 1971 it peaked at no. 22 in the Cash Box Top 100.

=== Billboard ===
On the Billboard Hot 100, it reached no. 32 and peaked at no. 8 on the Billboard soul singles chart.

== Other versions ==
A version was recorded by U.F.O. and released on the Semp label. Al Jarreau recorded a version which appeared on a release in 1976. Black Uhuru recorded a version that was released in 1984. Eternity's Children recorded a version that was released in 2003. Clarence Burke recorded a live version that was released in 2011, and Marcus Shelby had a version that was released in 2014. The song also appeared on a 1979 compilation by Climax. Reissued in 2014 on another compilation. SFJazz Collective had a live version that appeared on a release in 2020.
