= Rose Stone =

American singer and musician

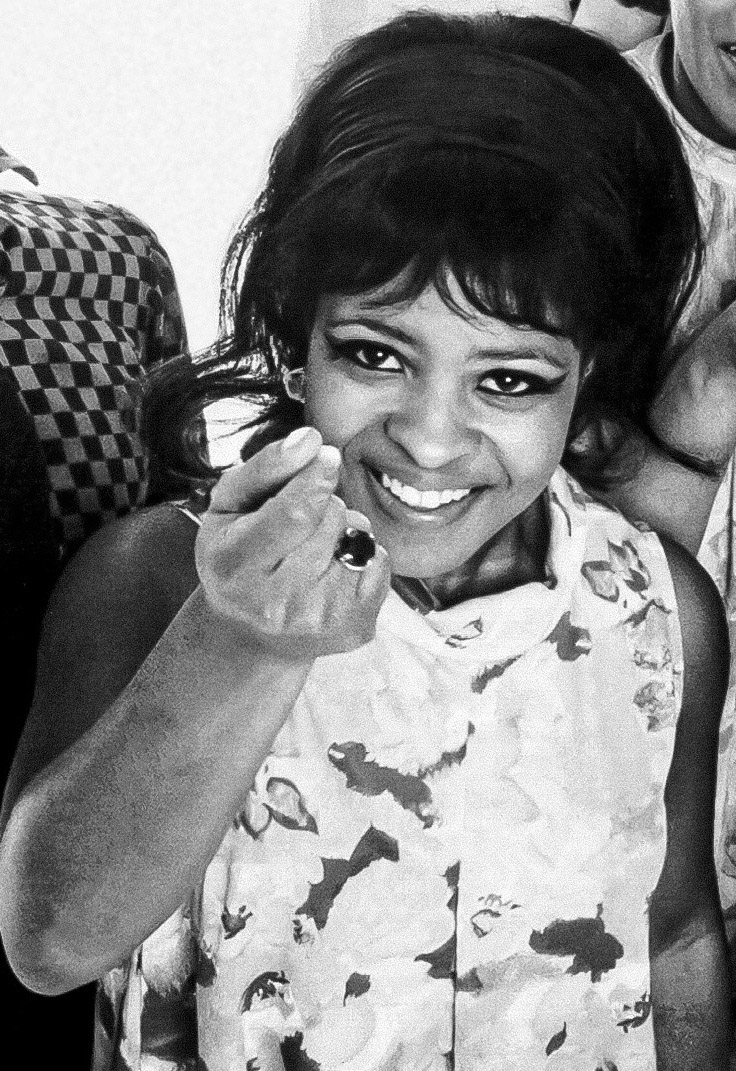
- Stone in 1968

Background information
- Also known as: Rose Banks
- Born: Rose Mary Stewart; March 21, 1945 (age 81); Solano, California, U.S.
- Genres: Soul; funk; R&B; psychedelic soul; Black gospel
- Occupations: Singer, musician
- Instruments: Vocals, keyboards
- Years active: 1952–present
- Labels: Epic, Motown

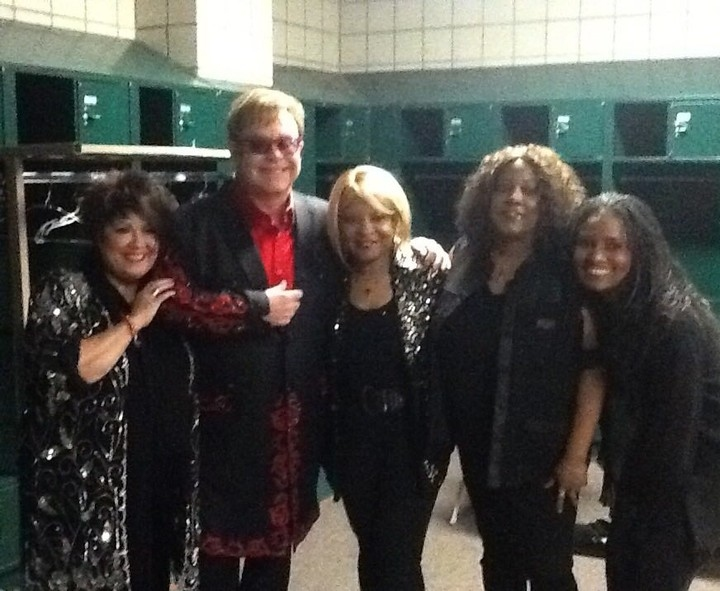
Stone with Elton John and other singers, including her daughter Lisa

Rose Stone (born Rose Mary Stewart, March 21, 1945) is an American singer and keyboardist. She is best known as one of the lead singers in Sly and the Family Stone, a popular psychedelic soul/funk band founded by her brothers, Sly Stone and Freddie Stone.

== Career ==
=== 1960s – 1980s ===
Her brothers Sly and Freddie, formed Sly and the Family Stone in 1966. Stewart later officially joined in late 1967. She often wore a platinum-colored wig while performing with the band, and was noted for her strong vocals.

"Sister Rose" (as she was also known) married Sly's confidant/former manager/co-producer, Hamp 'Bubba' Banks III in February 1973. After the band's dissolution in 1975, she later recorded a solo album on Motown Records, billed as Rose Banks.

During the 1980s and 1990s, Stone worked as a backing session singer, appearing on recordings by Michael Jackson, Phish, Ringo Starr, Reef and Bobbysocks!. Stone is today part of the musical department at her brother Freddie's church. She returned to her gospel roots in 1983 when she sang on Sandra Crouch's Grammy Award-winning album We Sing Praises, soloing on the old hymn "Power in the Blood". She has been associated with the Crouch family and the music department of Christ Memorial COGIC in California for many years.

=== 1990s – present ===
She sang backing vocals on the gospel-influenced tracks "You R Loved" and "Get Away" from Victoria Williams' 1994 album Loose. Also in 1994, she sang backing vocals on two songs on psychedelic rock band Phish's fifth album Hoist.

She also appears on Robbie Williams' album Escapology on the track "Revolution", a duet with Williams. She is the featured soloist in the church choir in the movie The Ladykillers. She is heard also in the music in the final credits. Her daughter, Lisa Stone, sang with Vet Stone and Cynthia Robinson in a Sly & the Family Stone tribute band. In 2006, Stone reunited with the original Family Stone.

In 2011 and 2012, Stone and her daughter Lisa toured with Elton John as members of his vocal backing group.

Stone appears briefly in a deleted scene "Judith's Youth" on the DVD of the movie 20 Feet from Stardom.

== Legacy ==
She was inducted into the Rock and Roll Hall of Fame in 1993 as a member of Sly and the Family Stone.

== Discography ==
Albums

- Rose (1976)

No.	Title	Writer(s)	Length
1.	"Whole New Thing"	Jeffrey Bowen, James Ford, Truman Thomas	3:30
2.	"Right's Alright"	Hamp 'Bubba' Banks III	4:07
3.	"I Get High On You"	Sylvester Stewart	3:45
4.	"Darling Baby"	Holland-Dozier-Holland	3:34
5.	"I've Got to Make It on My Own"	Victor Orsborn, Eric Jay Robinson	4:30
6.	"You're Much Too Beautiful For Words"	Victor Orsborn, Eric Jay Robinson	3:36
7.	"I'm So Glad You're Here"	Victor Orsborn, Eric Jay Robinson	4:05
8.	"It's Not The Season (It's The Reason)"	Jeffrey Bowen, James Ford, Hamp 'Bubba' Banks III	4:05
9.	"My Life Is Loving You"	Victor Orsborn, Eric Jay Robinson	5:00

- Already Motivated (2007)
