= Cynthia Robinson =

American musician (1944–2015)

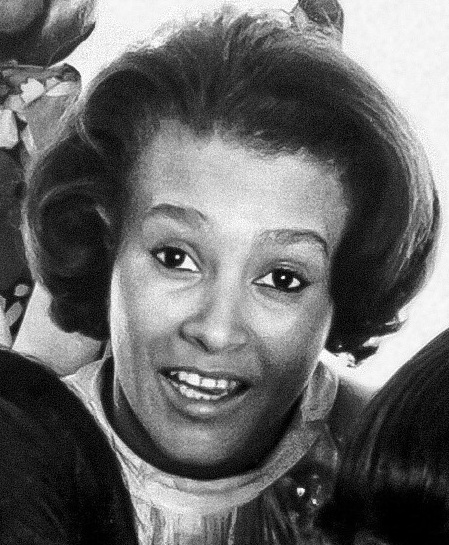
- Robinson in 1968

Background information
- Born: Cynthia Margaret Robinson; January 12, 1944; Sacramento, California, U.S.
- Died: November 23, 2015 (aged 71) Carmichael, California, U.S.
- Genres: Funk, soul, R&B
- Occupation: Musician
- Instruments: Trumpet, vocals, flugelhorn
- Years active: 1966–2015
- Formerly of: Sly and The Family Stone; Funkadelic

Cynthia Robinson (January 12, 1944 – November 23, 2015) was an American musician, best known for being a founding member of Sly and the Family Stone, for which she was the trumpeter and a vocalist. Her voice and presence were featured in the hits "Dance to the Music" and "I Want to Take You Higher." Questlove of the hip hop band the Roots has called Robinson the original "hypeman."

== Early life ==
Robinson grew up in Sacramento, California. She lived in Oak Park, a neighborhood in Sacramento. She played flute in elementary school, but there were no flutes available at her high school, and she was told to play the clarinet. Unhappy, she asked a fellow student, whom she had heard playing the trumpet in a practice room, if she could give his instrument a try.

“Everything I blew was off key, but I knew it could sound good if you worked on it, and that’s what I wanted to do,” she told the online magazine Rookie in 2013.

She attended Sacramento High School where she played trumpet in the school band. Robinson was taunted by the boys in her band class for being a black girl playing a "white boy's instrument". Robinson even recalled teachers suggesting she take up a different activity and save the trumpet for the boys, but Robinson was in love with the trumpet.

Her first trumpet belonged to a beatnik, who told her she could have it if she played at one of his parties. “It smelled bad, it had all kinds of green crud inside the tubing, so I took it home, cleaned it, soaked it in hot water, cleaned it all out, and it was mine,” she told Rookie.

Around 1959 to 1960, Sylvester Stewart (later known as Sly Stone) reconnected with Robinson by bringing a group of local musicians to her family home in Sacramento for a rehearsal. After being questioned on the porch by Robinson's mother, who knew how to play the guitar, the group held a spontaneous jam session where they performed a rendition of the Ray Sharpe song "Linda Lu."

After high school, Robinson continued playing trumpet in the Bay Area despite facing gender discrimination. In the mid-1960s, she learned Stewart was working as a prominent radio disc jockey under the pseudonym "Sly Stone" at KSOL and visited him at the studio. This reunion led directly to her joining his group, Sly and the Stoners, in 1966, the immediate precursor to Sly and the Family Stone.

== Sly and the Family Stone ==
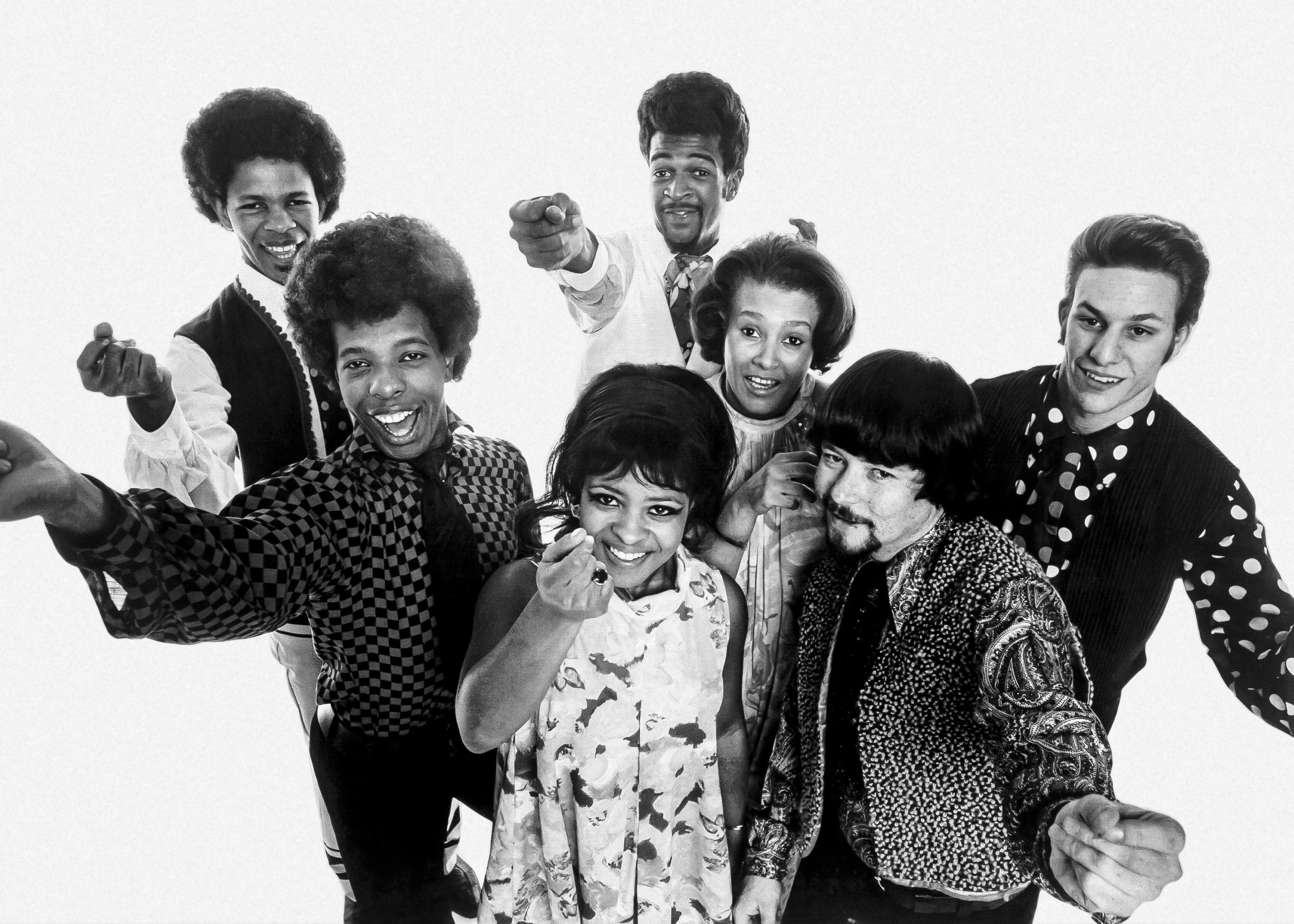
Sly and the Family Stone in 1968. Left to right: Freddie Stone, Sly Stone, Rose Stone, Larry Graham, Cynthia Robinson, Jerry Martini, and Greg Errico.

Robinson was a founding member of Sly and the Family Stone, starting in 1966. She was among the first female trumpeters in a major American band, and the first such player in the Rock and Roll Hall of Fame. Robinson's career with Sly Stone began in 1966 when the bandleader put together a group called the Stoners. They fell apart quickly, though, and she became a fixture of the Family Stone – a group whose members were male and female and represented different races, a novel idea at the time. She was the only trumpet player throughout the band's history.

At the height of their fame in 1969, Sly Stone cancelled 3 months worth of booked performances, including the Ed Sullivan Show, due to Cynthia recovering from a gall bladder operation.

Robinson was inducted into the Rock and Roll Hall of Fame as a member of Sly and the Family Stone in 1993. In 2006, she reunited with the original band members of Family Stone.

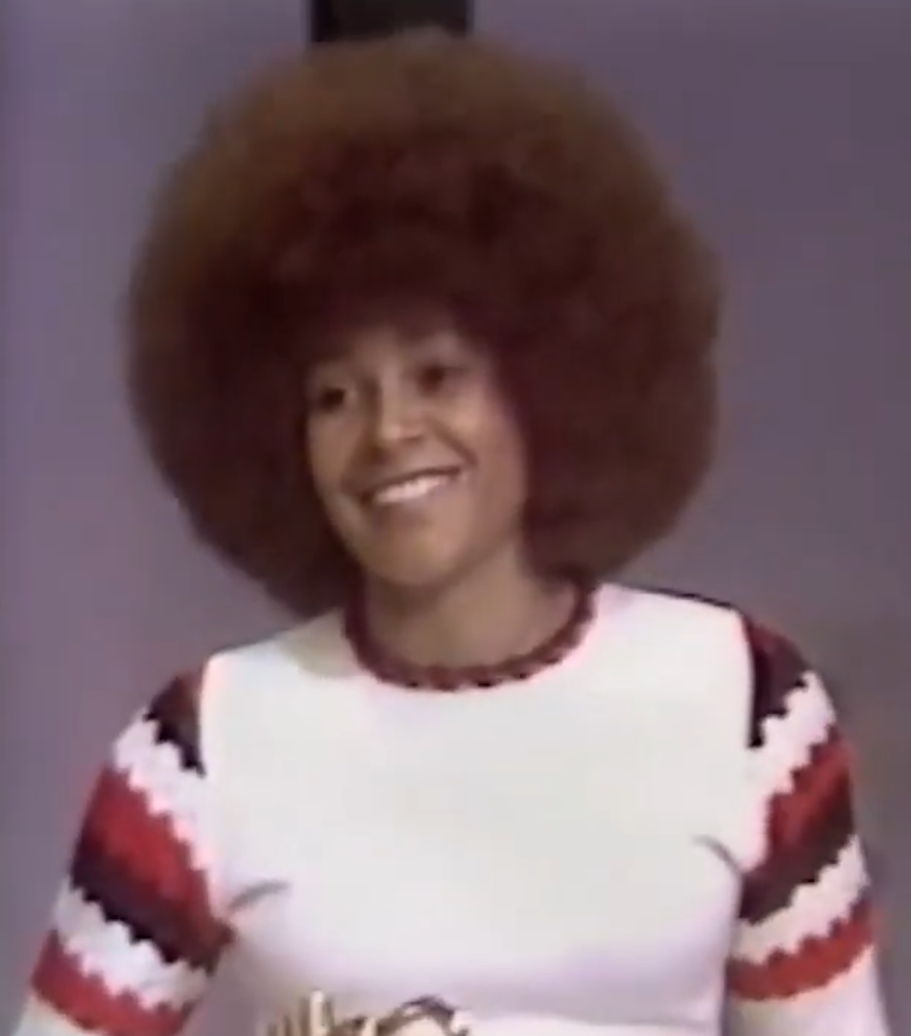
Robinson in 1974

== Later career ==
Robinson was the only member of the original Family Stone to continue working with Sly Stone after the band fell apart in 1975. She also played in the funk band Graham Central Station with Family Stone bandmate Larry Graham, starting in the 1990s. She also worked with George Clinton and Prince.

== Personal life and death ==
Robinson was the mother of two daughters. Her first daughter, Laura Marie Cook, was born in 1964 to Robinson and her former boyfriend Harold Andrews, an Oakland-based singer-songwriter and producer. She also had a relationship with Sly Stone, with whom she had a daughter, Sylvyette Phunne Robinson, born in December 1975.

On November 23, 2015, Robinson died of cancer in Carmichael, California at the age of 71.

== Appears on ==
- Little Ronnie And The Chromatics – I Was Wrong - HLS Records – 1001 (1966) [As a co-writer]
- Stargard – Back 2 Back – Warner Bros. Records – BSK 3456 (1981)
- Funkadelic – The Electric Spanking of War Babies – Warner Bros. Records – BSK 3482 (1981) – Tracks: "Funk Gets Stronger" (Part I)”, "Funk Gets Stronger" (Killer Millimeter Longer Version)”/ "She Loves You"
- Graham Central Station – GCS 2000 – NPG Records (1998) – Track: "GCS2000"
- The Robert Cray Band – Time Will Tell – Sanctuary Records 06078-84613-2 (2003) – Track: "Your Pal"
