= Freddie Stone =

American musician

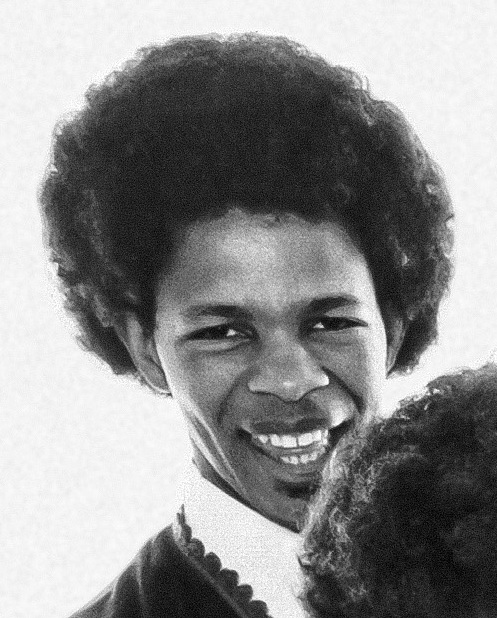
- Stone in 1968
- Born: Frederick Jerome Stewart; June 5, 1947 (age 79); Vallejo, California, U.S.
- Other name: Freddie Stewart
- Occupations: Musician, pastor, guitarist, vocalist
- Years active: Musician (1966–present); Pastor (1994–present)
- Known for: Founding member of Sly & The Family Stone
- Children: 6

Frederick Jerome Stewart (born June 5, 1947), known professionally as Freddie Stone, is an American pastor and musician, known for being a member of Sly and the Family Stone.

== Career ==
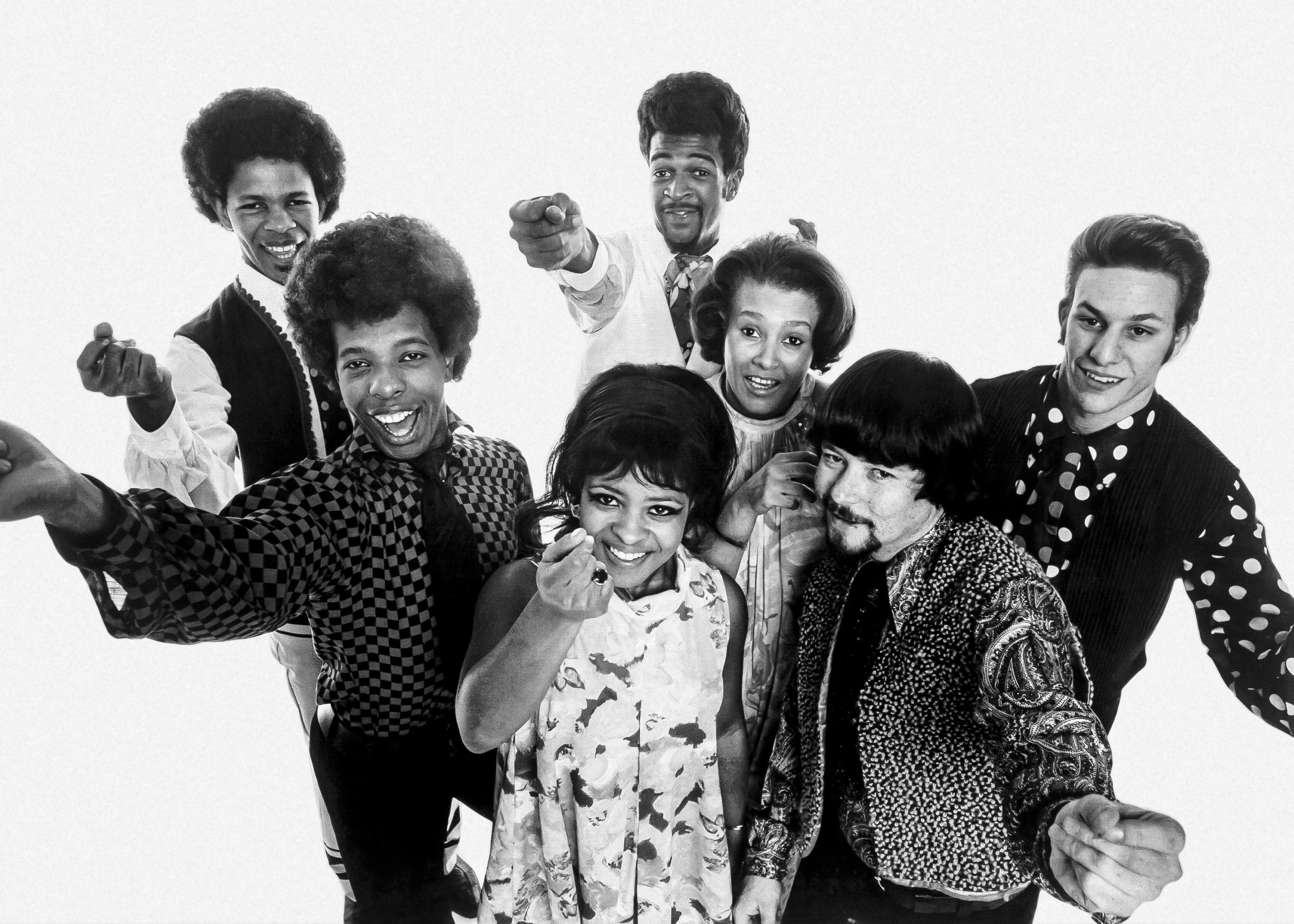
Sly and the Family Stone in 1968. Left to right: Freddie Stone, Sly Stone, Rose Stone, Larry Graham, Cynthia Robinson, Jerry Martini, and Greg Errico.

Born Frederick Stewart, he started playing music when he was twelve. In 1966, Freddie co-founded the band Sly and the Family Stone, fronted by his brother Sly and including his sister Rose. He was the guitarist and vocalist. After leaving the band in the late 1970s, Stone signed a short recording contract with Motown Records. He was inducted into the Rock and Roll Hall of Fame in 1993 as a member of Sly and the Family Stone.

== Personal life ==
His childhood years were spent in Vallejo, California. His parents were Christians and they attended the Pentecostal church. They also were musicians with his father playing violin, harp and guitar and his mother playing guitar as well as piano. His early years were spent at church and without racial inhibition. His mother would babysit the children in the neighborhood who happened to be of all colors.

As a result of fighting at Vallejo High School, he was expelled and had to attend Benicia High School. He did quite well there and in his junior year he was MVP on his basketball team. In his senior year he was president of the student body. Not long after he graduated, the Stewart family along with Freddie moved to San Francisco.

== Ministry ==
According to a 2009 KCRW interview with Sly Stone, Freddie has been, since 1994, Pastor Frederick Stewart, a preacher in his native Vallejo. He became a committed Christian in 1980 and in 1988 he was ordained as a pastor. Over a period of time he was being prepared to take over his uncle's church, the Evangelist Temple Fellowship Center, of which he is currently Pastor. The church is located on Sonoma Boulevard in Vallejo, California.

== Releases ==
Albums

- Everywhere You Are - (2001; released as Right Now in 2012)

Singles

- "Steadfast" - (2019)
