= Empty light bulb sign =

Imaging finding supporting a diagnosis of brain death

The empty light bulb sign, hollow skull sign, or empty skull sign, is a finding on radionuclide cerebral perfusion scintigraphy that supports a diagnosis of brain death. When a brain-specific lipophilic tracer is used, the brain takes up no activity, so the cranial vault appears empty within the outline of the surrounding scalp and facial soft tissue.

The appearance is produced with a lipophilic radiopharmaceutical such as technetium-99m hexamethylpropyleneamine oxime (Tc-99m HMPAO) or technetium-99m ethyl cysteinate dimer, which crosses an intact blood-brain barrier and is trapped in brain tissue in proportion to regional cerebral blood flow. In brain death, raised intracranial pressure arrests flow in the internal carotid arteries so that no tracer reaches the brain, while flow continues in the external carotid arteries and supplies the scalp and face. Prominent activity in the nasal region from this external carotid supply has been termed the hot nose sign, a label first applied to the comparable appearance on contrast-enhanced magnetic resonance imaging by Orrison and colleagues in 1994.

The hollow skull sign on Tc-99m HMPAO scintigraphy was first reported by Abdel-Dayem and colleagues in 1989.

== See also ==
- Brain death
- Hot nose sign
- Cerebral angiography
