= Lazarus sign =

Reflex movement in brain-dead or brainstem failure patients

Brain death – Lazarus sign. After the recording, his organs were donated.

The Lazarus sign or Lazarus reflex is a reflex movement in brain-dead or brainstem failure patients, which causes them to briefly raise their arms and drop them crossed on their chests. The phenomenon is named after Lazarus of Bethany, who the biblical Gospel of John states was raised from the dead by Jesus.

== Causes ==
Like the knee jerk reflex, the Lazarus sign is an example of a reflex mediated by a reflex arc—a neural pathway which passes via the spinal column but not through the brain. As a consequence, the movement is possible in brain-dead patients whose organs have been kept functioning by life-support machines, precluding the use of complex involuntary motions as a test for brain activity. Some neurologists believe that hypoxia could lead to Lazarus sign but this theory lost strength as incidents of new cases in patients with normal oxygen level began to arise. It has been suggested by neurologists studying the phenomenon that increased awareness of this and similar reflexes "may prevent delays in brain-dead diagnosis and misinterpretations."

The reflex is often preceded by slight shivering motions of the patient's arms, or the appearance of goose bumps on the arms and torso. The arms then begin to flex at the elbows before lifting to be held above the sternum. They are often brought from here towards the neck or chin and touch or cross over. Short exhalations have also been observed coinciding with the action.

== Occurrences ==
The phenomenon has been observed to occur several minutes after the removal of medical ventilators used to pump air in and out of brain-dead patients. It also occurs during testing for apnea—that is, suspension of external breathing and motion of the lung muscles—which is one of the criteria for determining brain death used for example by the American Academy of Neurology.

Occurrences of the Lazarus sign in intensive-care units have been mistaken for evidence of resuscitation of patients. They may frighten those who witness the movement, and have been viewed by some as miraculous events.

== See also ==
- Lazarus syndrome
- Abnormal posturing
