= John Derhak =

American writer (born 1957)

John E. Derhak (born 1957) is a Canadian-born, American novelist, writer, and historian. His works of fiction include, Tales from the moe.Republic, Chill Your Cockles, The Bones of Lazarus, and The Guardian Angel of Death.

His first novel, Tales from the moe.Republic (2007), tells the story of a humble, yet bungling innkeeper, "brother John," as he manages a small town inn, the moe.Republic Hotel, in a place called the Lost Kingdom of Moose Harbor, on the coast of rural Maine. The book is noted for its humor, character development, and storytelling. The book was optioned to Signet Entertainment, a division of Signet International Holdings, Inc., in 2007.

Chill Your Cockles (2008), his second book, follows a storyline from his first work, and is a collection of mysterious and haunting tales that serve to further the histories, and add layers to, the fantastic legends and characters that inhabit the Lost Kingdom of Moose Harbor, Maine.

The Bones of Lazarus (2012), is a supernatural thriller that traces intersecting lives on a war-torn, resource rich, Caribbean island. The plot revolves around the premise that Lazarus of Bethany, the man resurrected by the hand of Christ, became an immortal creature of Judgment, seeking the hearts and souls of the wicked. Other themes explored by Derhak include political and social manipulation, terrorism, arms proliferation, the selling of news as entertainment, greed, plunder of natural resources, and religion. The novel is based on a short work that originally appeared in Chill Your Cockles.

The Guardian Angel of Death (2017) is a prequel to Derhak's first novel, Tales from the moe.Republic Set on Halloween day, 1932, in rural Maine, the novel expands on a story from Tales, told by the fabled baseball-playing, Porter Gibson 'Digit.' Stalked by the Angel of Death, enchanted by a gypsy woman, haunted by a ghastly specter, and pursued by gangsters, Porter struggles for his sanity and survival amidst the backdrop of the Great Depression, Prohibition and rum-running, and government surveillance.

The author stated in a June 2010, interview with Jam Forums Jam Forums that three novels were currently in the works. One of them, The Bones of Lazarus, was published in 2012. A second, The Guardian Angel of Death, was published in 2017.

The song, "The Bones of Lazarus," by the rock band moe., on their 2012 album, "What Happened to the La Las" (Sugar Hill Records), was named for the novel.
