= Lazarus of Bethany =

Person resurrected by Jesus in the Gospel of John

Saint Lazarus of Bethany
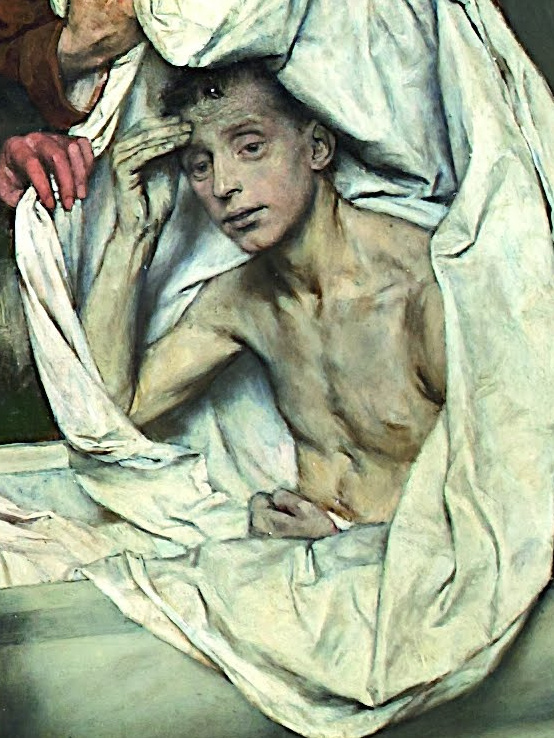
- Detail from The Raising of Lazarus by Eduard von Gebhardt, 1896

Four-days dead, friend of Christ
- Died: 1st century AD
- Venerated in: Catholic Church; Eastern Orthodox Church; Oriental Orthodox Church; Anglican Communion; Lutheran Church; Islam
- Feast: Eastern Churches: Lazarus Saturday; 17 March; 17 October; Western Churches: 29 July
- Attributes: Sometimes vested as an apostle, sometimes as a bishop. In the scene of his resurrection, he is portrayed tightly bound in mummified clothes, which resemble swaddling bands.
- Patronage: Lepers and beggars

Lazarus of Bethany (Note: Latin: Lazarus; from Ancient Greek: Λάζαρος, romanized: Lā́zāros; from Hebrew: אֶלְעָזָר, romanized: ʾelʿāzār) is a figure of the New Testament whose life is restored by Jesus four days after his death, as told in the Gospel of John. The resurrection is considered one of the miracles of Jesus. In the Eastern Orthodox Church, Lazarus is venerated as Righteous Lazarus, the Four-Days Dead. The Eastern Orthodox and Catholic traditions offer varying accounts of the later events of his life.

In the context of the seven signs in the Gospel of John, the raising of Lazarus at Bethany – today the town of Al-Eizariya in the West Bank, Palestine, which translates to "the place of Lazarus" – is the climactic narrative: exemplifying the power of Jesus "over the last and most irresistible enemy of humanity; death. For this reason, it is given a prominent place in the gospel."

The name Lazarus is frequently used in science and popular culture in reference to apparent restoration to life; for example, the scientific term Lazarus taxon denotes organisms that reappear in the fossil record after a period of apparent extinction, and also the Lazarus sign and the Lazarus syndrome.

A distinct character of the same name is also mentioned in the Gospel of Luke in Jesus's parable of the rich man and Lazarus, in which both eponymous characters die, and the former begs for the latter to comfort him from his torments in hell.

== Raising of Lazarus ==
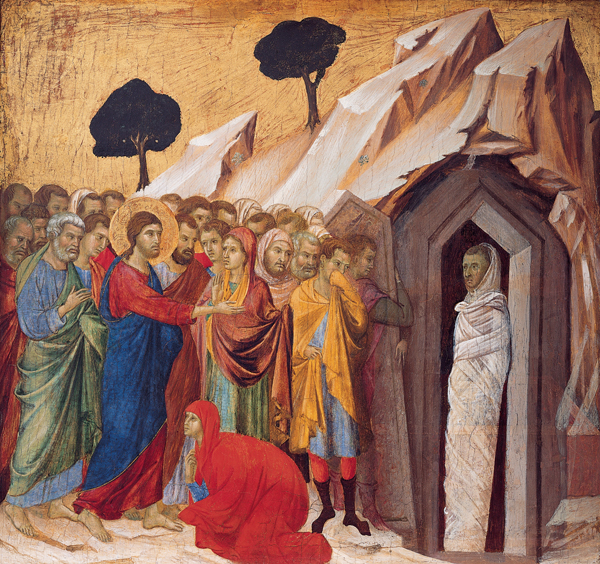
The Raising of Lazarus, by Duccio, 1310–11

The raising of Lazarus is a story of the miracle of Jesus recounted in the Gospel of John (John 11:1–44) in the New Testament, as well as in the Secret Gospel of Mark (a fragment of an extended version of the Gospel of Mark) in which Jesus raises Lazarus of Bethany from the dead four days after his entombment. The event took place at Bethany. In John, this is the last of the miracles that Jesus performs before the passion, crucifixion and his own resurrection.

=== Narrative ===
The biblical narrative of the raising of Lazarus is found in chapter 11 of the Gospel of John. A certain Lazarus, who lives in the town of Bethany near Jerusalem, is introduced as a follower of Jesus. He is identified as the brother of the sisters Mary and Martha. The sisters send word to Jesus that Lazarus, "the one You love is sick." Jesus tells his followers: "This sickness will not end in death. No, it is for the glory of God, so that the Son of God may be glorified through it." Instead of immediately traveling to Bethany, according to the narrator, Jesus intentionally remains where he is for two more days before beginning the journey. The disciples are afraid of returning to Judea, but Jesus says: "Our friend Lazarus has fallen asleep, but I am going there to wake him up." When the apostles misunderstand, he clarifies, "Lazarus is dead, and for your sake I am glad I was not there, so that you may believe. But let us go to him."

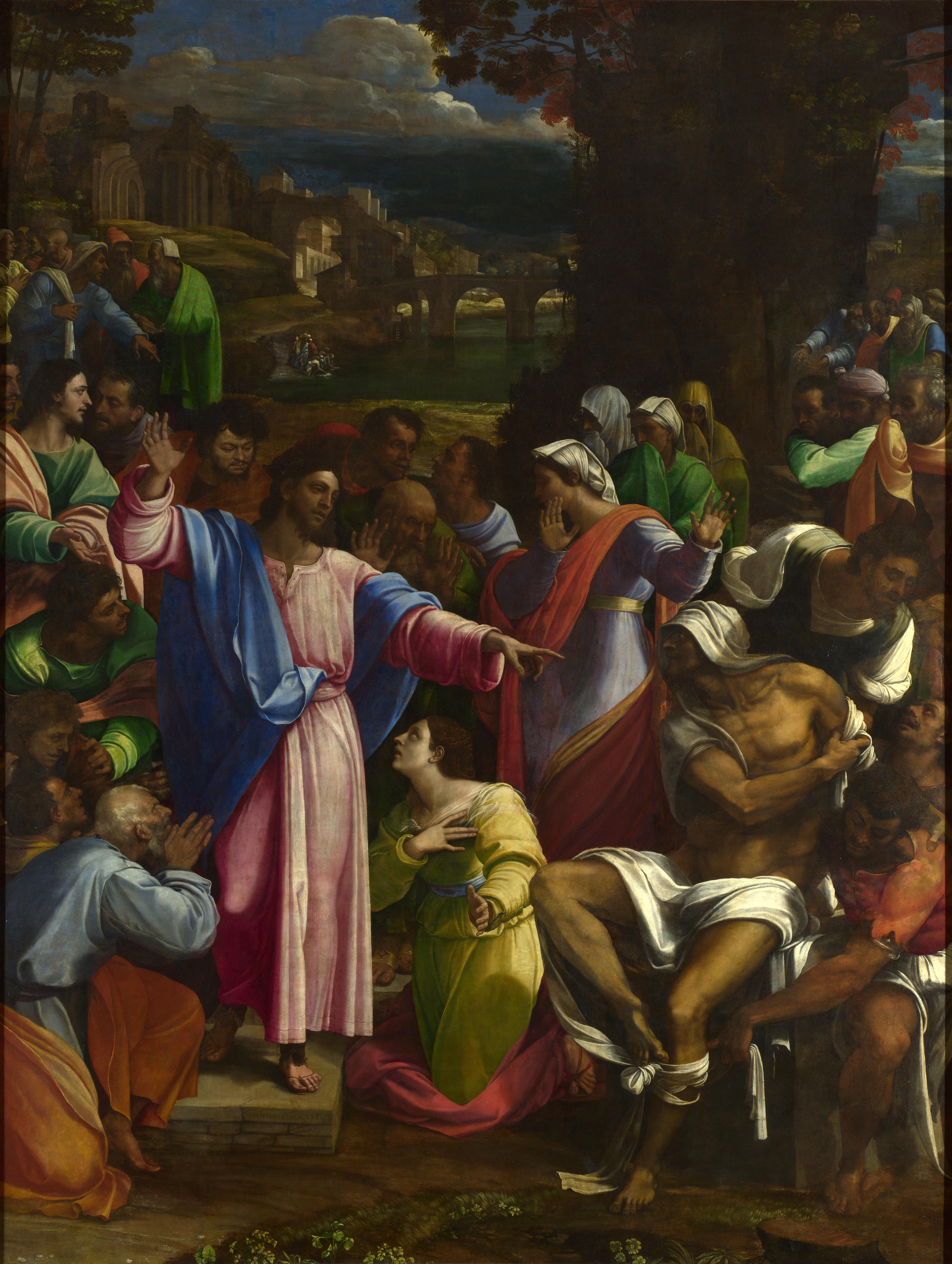
The Raising of Lazarus, Oil on canvas, c. 1517–1519, Sebastiano del Piombo (National Gallery, London)

When Jesus arrives in Bethany, he finds that Lazarus is dead and has already been in his tomb for four days. He meets first with Martha and Mary in turn. Martha laments that Jesus did not arrive soon enough to heal her brother ("Lord, if You had been here, my brother would not have died.") and Jesus replies with the well-known statement, "I am the resurrection and the life. He who believes in Me will live, even though he dies." Martha affirms that she does truly believe and states, "Yes, Lord; I believe that You are the Christ, the Son of God, who was to come into the world." Jesus then meets with Mary who likewise says "Lord, if You had been here, my brother would not have died." Here the narrator gives the famous simple phrase, "Jesus wept."

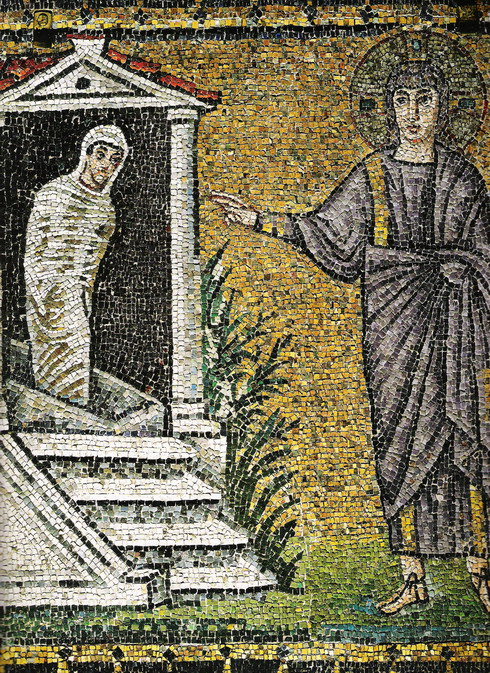
Raising of Lazarus, 6th-century, mosaic, church of Sant'Apollinare Nuovo, Ravenna, Italy

In the presence of a crowd of Jewish mourners, Jesus comes to the tomb. Jesus asks for the stone of the tomb to be removed, but Martha interjects that there will be a smell. Jesus responds, "Did I not tell you that if you believed, you would see the glory of God?" Over the objections of Martha, Jesus has them roll the stone away from the entrance to the tomb and says a prayer. They take the stone away then Jesus looks up and says: "Father, I thank you that you have heard me. I knew that you always hear me, but I say this for the benefit of the people standing here, so they may believe that you sent me." He then calls Lazarus to come out ("Lazarus, come out!") and Lazarus does so, still wrapped in his grave-cloths. Jesus then calls for someone to remove the grave-cloths, and let him go.

The narrative ends with the statement that many of the witnesses to this event "believed in him". Others are said to have reported the events to the religious authorities in Jerusalem.

The Gospel of John mentions Lazarus again in chapter 12. Six days before the Passover on which Jesus is crucified, Jesus returns to Bethany and Lazarus attends a supper that Martha, his sister, serves. Jesus and Lazarus together attract the attention of many Jews and the narrator states that the chief priests consider having Lazarus put to death because so many people are believing in Jesus on account of this miracle.

The miracle of the raising of Lazarus, the longest coherent narrative in John aside from the Passion, is the culmination of John's "signs". It explains why there were crowds seeking Jesus on Palm Sunday, and leads directly to the decision of Caiaphas and the Sanhedrin to put Jesus on trial.

A resurrection story that is very similar is also found in the controversial Secret Gospel of Mark, although the young man is not named there specifically. Some scholars believe that the Secret Mark version represents an earlier form of the canonical story found in John.

=== Interpretation ===
==== The name "Lazarus" ====
The name "Lazarus" is the Greek rendering of the Hebrew אֶלְעָזָר (Eleazar) which means "God has helped". Bede comments that "Of all the dead which our Lord raised, he was most helped, for he had lain dead four days, when our Lord raised him to life."

==== Theological commentary ====
Theologians Moloney and Harrington view the raising of Lazarus as a "pivotal miracle" which starts the chain of events that leads to the Crucifixion of Jesus. They consider it as a "resurrection that will lead to death", in that the raising of Lazarus will lead to the death of Jesus, the Son of God, in Jerusalem which will reveal the Glory of God.

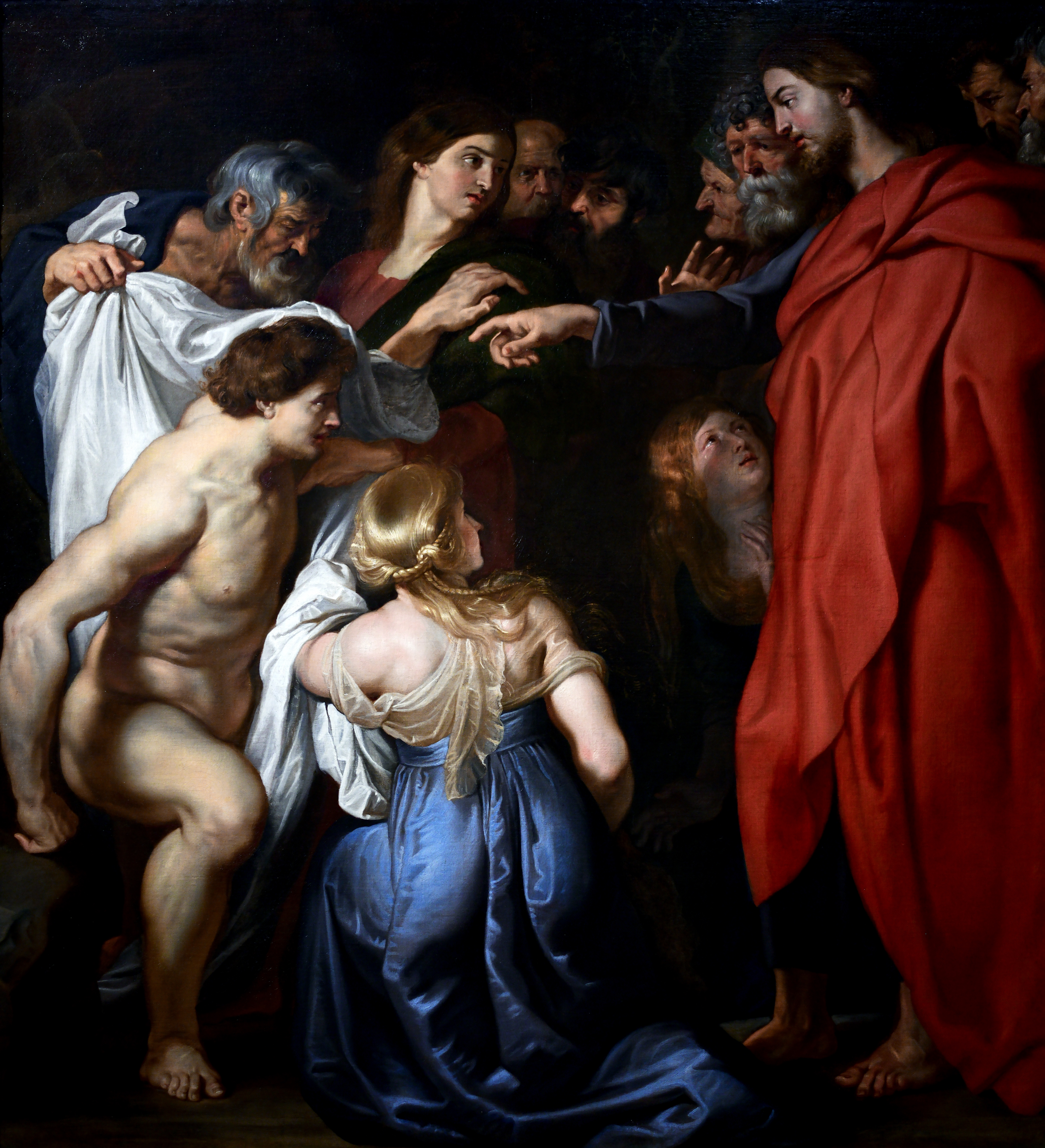
The raising of Lazarus, by Peter Paul Rubens, 1625

The Catechism of the Catholic Church states that the miracle performed by Jesus returned Lazarus to ordinary earthly life, as with the son of the widow of Nain and Jairus' daughter, and that Lazarus and the others who were raised from the dead would later die again. The Russian Orthodox Church's Catechism of St. Philaret states that among the miracles performed by Jesus was the raising of Lazarus from the dead on the fourth day after Lazarus' death. In the Southern Baptist Convention's 2014 resolution On the Sufficiency of Scripture Regarding the Afterlife, the raising of Lazarus is noted among the Bible's "explicit accounts of persons raised from the dead", and comments on those raisings that, "in God's perfect revelatory wisdom, He has not given us any report of their individual experience in the afterlife".

John Calvin notes that, "not only did Christ give a remarkable proof of his Divine power in raising Lazarus, but he likewise placed before our eyes a lively image of our future resurrection." French Protestant minister Jakob Abbadie wrote that Jesus had intentionally delayed his return to Bethany for, "four days, that it might not be said, he [Lazarus] was not really dead." In 2008, Pope Benedict XVI said that the Gospel story of the raising of Lazarus, "shows Christ's absolute power over life and death and reveals His nature as true man and true God" and that "Jesus' lordship over death does not prevent him from showing sincere compassion over the pain of this separation."

Matthew Poole and others saw Lazarus' ability to move despite having his hands and feet wrapped together as a second miracle, but Charles Ellicott disputed that Lazarus' movement would have been restricted by his burial garments.

Justus Knecht wrote that the object of this miracle related to the fact that, "the time of our Lord's Passion and Death was at hand, and He wrought this mighty miracle beforehand in order that the faith of His disciples, and more especially of His apostles, might be strengthened, and 'that they might believe' and not doubt when they saw their Lord and Master in the hour of His abasement; and most of all to enable them to hope, when they saw His Body laid in the sepulchre, that He who had raised up Lazarus would Himself rise again."

In Roger Baxter's Meditations, he reflects on the verse "His sisters therefore sent to Him saying, Lord, behold he whom Thou lovest is sick", writing that "they do not prescribe to Him what they wish Him to do; to a loving friend it is sufficient to intimate our necessities. Such ought to be the nature of our prayers, particularly in regard to health and other temporal blessings, for we do not know in such cases what is expedient for our salvation."

==== Narrative criticism ====
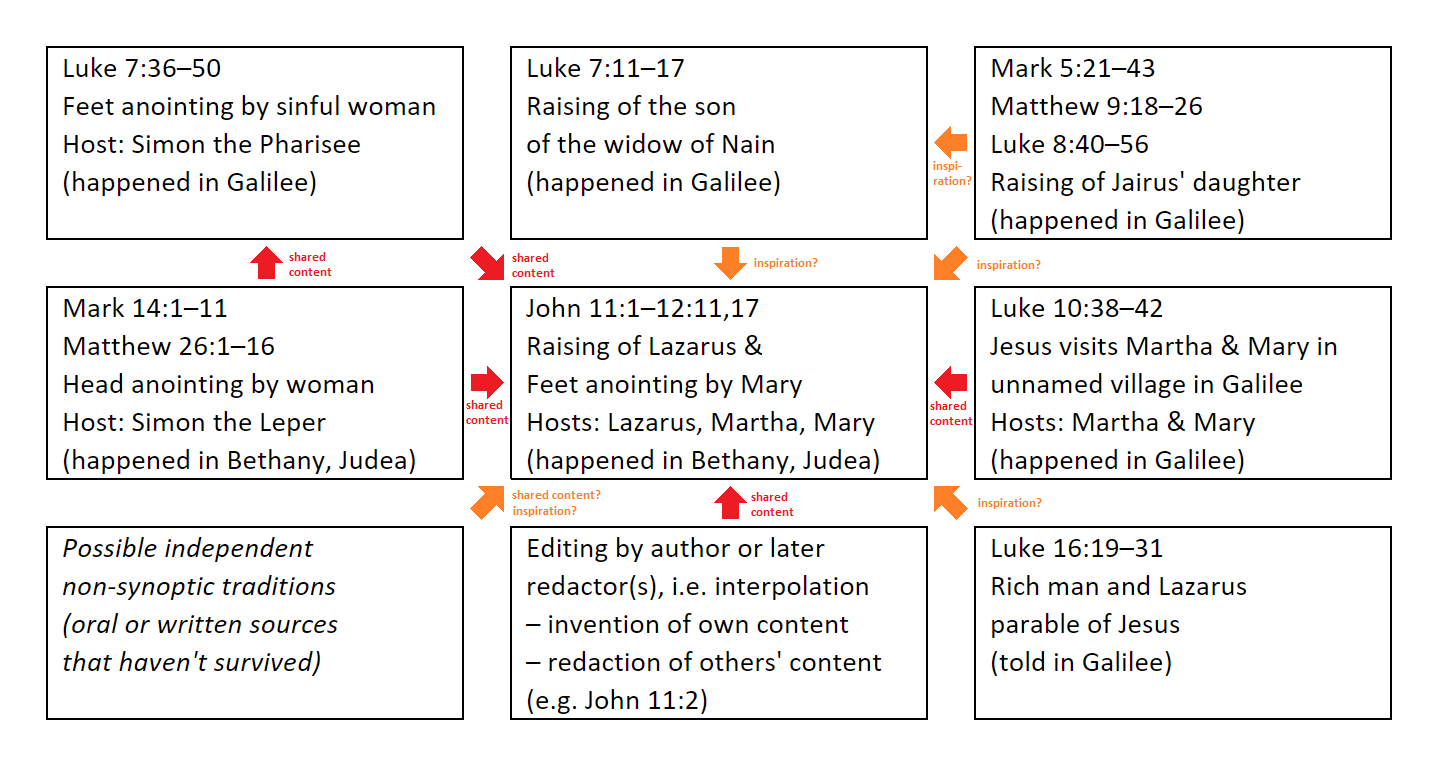
New Testament scholars have sought to explain how the story of Lazarus was probably composed.

New Testament scholars try to establish how John's narrative of the raising of Lazarus and the subsequent feet-anointing of Jesus by Mary of Bethany (John 11:1–12:11,17) was composed by seeking to explain its apparent relationships with the older textual traditions of the Synoptic Gospels. Scholars such as Mark Goodacre and B. H. Streeter have argued that the evangelist may have used elements and presupposed the earlier accounts in the Synoptics, from the unnamed woman's head-anointing of Jesus in Bethany (Mark 14, Matthew 26), the sinful woman's feet-anointing (and hair-wiping) of Jesus in Galilee (Luke 7; these first two may have a common origin, the Lukan account likely being derived from Mark), Jesus' visit to Martha and Mary in the unnamed Galilean village (Luke 10), Jesus' parable of the rich man and Lazarus (Luke 16), and possibly others involving Jesus' miraculous raising of the dead (the raising of Jairus' daughter and the raising of the son of the widow of Nain). Simon the Leper/Simon the Pharisee was replaced by Lazarus as the host of the feast in Jesus' honour, and Bethany in Judea was chosen as the setting, while most elements of John's narrative correspond to traditions that the Synoptics set in Galilee. Scholars pay particular attention to verse 11:1-2, which may represent an effort by the author to stress a connection between these stories not found in the older canonical gospels. They further note that the actual anointing will not be narrated until verse 12:3, and that neither Mary, nor Martha, nor the village of these sisters, nor any anointing is mentioned in the Gospel of John before this point, suggesting that the author assumes the readers already have knowledge of these characters, this location and this event, and wants to tell them that these were connected (which he apparently knew the readers did not commonly know/believe yet) long before giving the readers more details. Elser and Piper (2006) posited that verse 11:2 is evidence that the author of the Gospel of John deliberately mixed up several traditions in an 'audacious attempt (...) to rework the collective memory of the Christ-movement.' The author did not strive to give a historically accurate account of what had happened, but instead, for theological purposes, combined various existing narratives in order to construct Lazarus, Mary and Martha of Bethany as a prototypical Christian family, whose example is to be followed by Christians. Zangenberg (2023), however, doubts that John 11 was dependent on the other synoptic stories, finding the evidence for this theory insufficient. He also argues that John displays an accurate knowledge of Jewish burial customs at the time, as attested by archaeology and ancient Jewish texts.

Earlier commentators include deist Lysander Spooner, who wrote in 1836 that it was unusual that the Synoptic Gospels (Matthew, Mark and Luke) do not mention the miracle of the raising of Lazarus, which seems as if it could have been a demonstration of the miraculous powers of Jesus. The Synoptic Gospels do include passages concerning the activities of the sisters of Lazarus but fail to mention their brother's resurrection. Spooner wrote that this seemed to indicate that the author of the Gospel of John, "was actually dishonest, or that he took up, believed and recorded a flying story, which an occurrence of some kind had given rise to, but which was without any foundation in truth." In 1892, agnostic speaker Robert G. Ingersoll found the narrative historically implausible, writing that, if Lazarus had in fact died, potentially participating in an afterlife, and then subsequently had been resurrected, the experiences Lazarus could have shared with others would likely have been more interesting than everything else in the New Testament, would have drawn widespread attention to Lazarus during his lifetime and might have made him less afraid than others that did not have his experience when Lazarus approached death for a second time. Exegesis in the Interpreter's Bible (1953) comparing the raising of Lazarus to other resurrections in the Bible comments that, "The difference between revival immediately after death, and resurrection after four days, is so great as to raise doubts about the historicity of this story, especially in view of the unimaginable details in vs. 44. Yet there are features in this story which have the marks of verisimilitude." Other scholars posit that the events leading to Jesus's death in Synoptic Gospels were based on an early account, before the Gospel of Mark was written, in which many characters are anonymous because they were still living and would be subject to persecution, whereas John's account of the same events was written much later and could name the anonymous characters and could also include the raising of Lazarus because all of the individuals had died, and were no longer subject to persecution.

=== Tomb of Lazarus ===
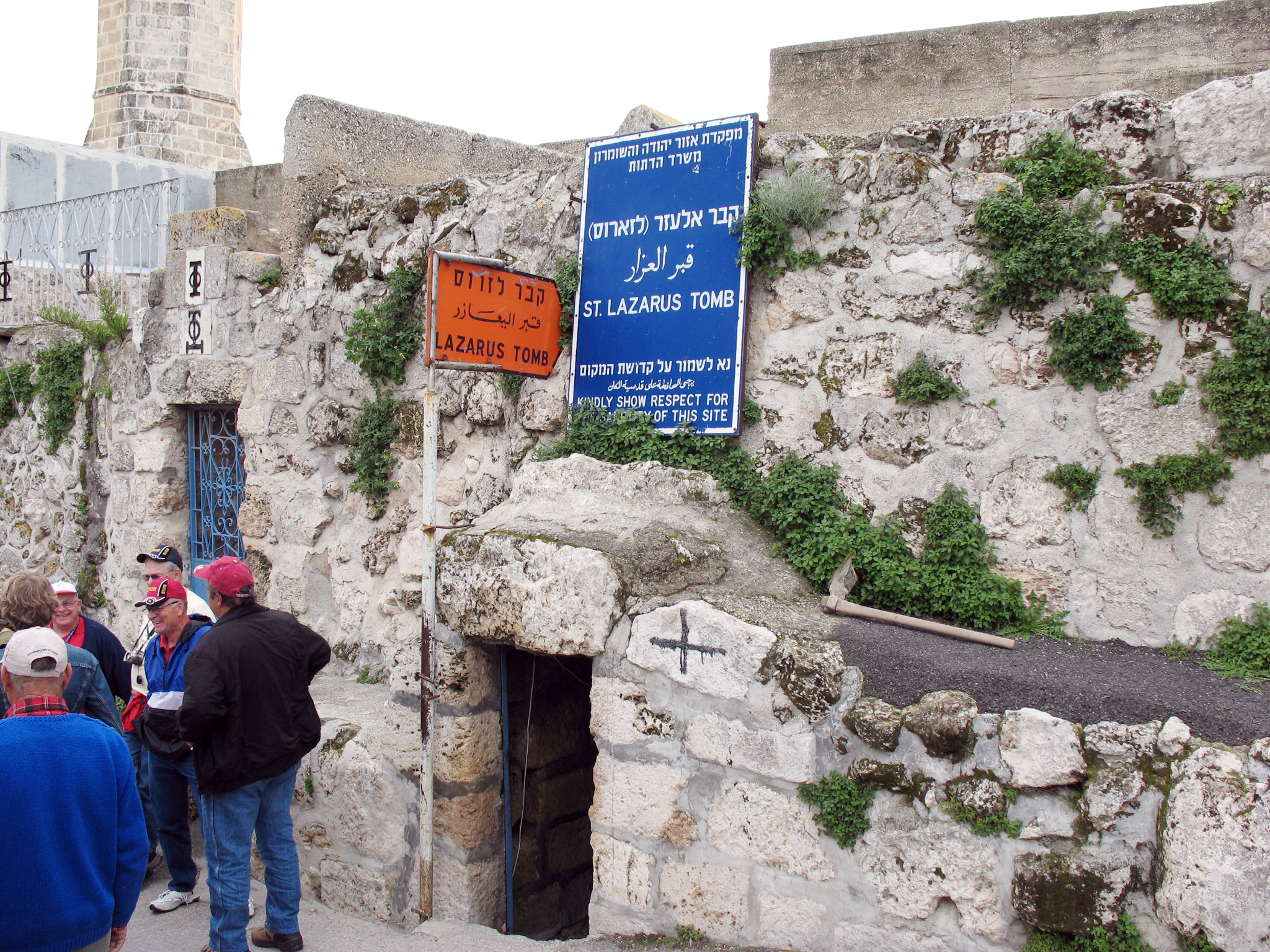
Reputed tomb of Lazarus in al-Eizariya

The reputed first tomb of Lazarus is in Bethany and continues to be a place of pilgrimage to this day. Several Christian churches have existed at the site over the centuries. Since the 16th century, the site of the tomb has been occupied by the al-Uzair Mosque. The adjacent Roman Catholic Church of Saint Lazarus, designed by Antonio Barluzzi and built between 1952 and 1955 under the auspices of the Franciscan Order, stands upon the site of several much older ones. In 1965, a Greek Orthodox church was built just west of the tomb.

The entrance to the tomb today is via a flight of uneven rock-cut steps from the street. As it was described in 1896, there were twenty-four steps from the then-modern street level, leading to a square chamber serving as a place of prayer, from which more steps led to a lower chamber believed to be the tomb of Lazarus. The same description applies today.

The first mention of a church at Bethany is in the late 4th century, but both the historian Eusebius of Caesarea (c. 330) and the Bordeaux pilgrim do mention the tomb of Lazarus. In 390 Jerome mentions a church dedicated to Saint Lazarus, called the Lazarium. This is confirmed by the pilgrim Egeria in about the year 410. Therefore, the church is thought to have been built between 333 and 390. The present-day gardens contain the remnants of a mosaic floor from the 4th-century church. The Lazarium was destroyed by an earthquake in the 6th century, and was replaced by a larger church. This church survived intact until the Crusader era.

In 1143 the existing structure and lands were purchased by King Fulk and Queen Melisende of Jerusalem and a large Benedictine convent dedicated to Mary and Martha was built near the tomb of Lazarus. After the fall of Jerusalem in 1187, the convent was deserted and fell into ruin with only the tomb and barrel vaulting surviving. By 1384, a simple mosque had been built on the site. In the 16th century, the Ottomans built the larger al-Uzair Mosque to serve the town's (now Muslim) inhabitants and named it in honor of the town's patron saint, Lazarus of Bethany.

Lazarus' tomb, Bethany

According to the Catholic Encyclopedia of 1913, there were scholars who questioned the reputed site of the ancient village (though this was discounted by the Encyclopedia's author):

Some believe that the present village of Bethany does not occupy the site of the ancient village; but that it grew up around the traditional cave which they suppose to have been at some distance from the house of Martha and Mary in the village; Zanecchia (La Palestine d'aujourd'hui, 1899, I, 445ff.) places the site of the ancient village of Bethany higher up on the southeastern slope of the Mount of Olives, not far from the accepted site of Bethphage, and near that of the Ascension. It is quite certain that the present village formed about the traditional tomb of Lazarus, which is in a cave in the village. The identification of this cave as the tomb of Lazarus is merely possible; it has no strong intrinsic or extrinsic authority. The site of the ancient village may not precisely coincide with the present one, but there is every reason to believe that it was in this general location."

== Other traditions ==
While there is no further mention of Lazarus in the Bible, the Eastern Orthodox and Roman Catholic traditions offer varying accounts of the later events of his life. He is most commonly associated with Cyprus, where he is said to have become the first bishop of Kition (Larnaka), and Provence, where he is said to have been the first bishop of Marseille.

=== Bishop of Kition ===
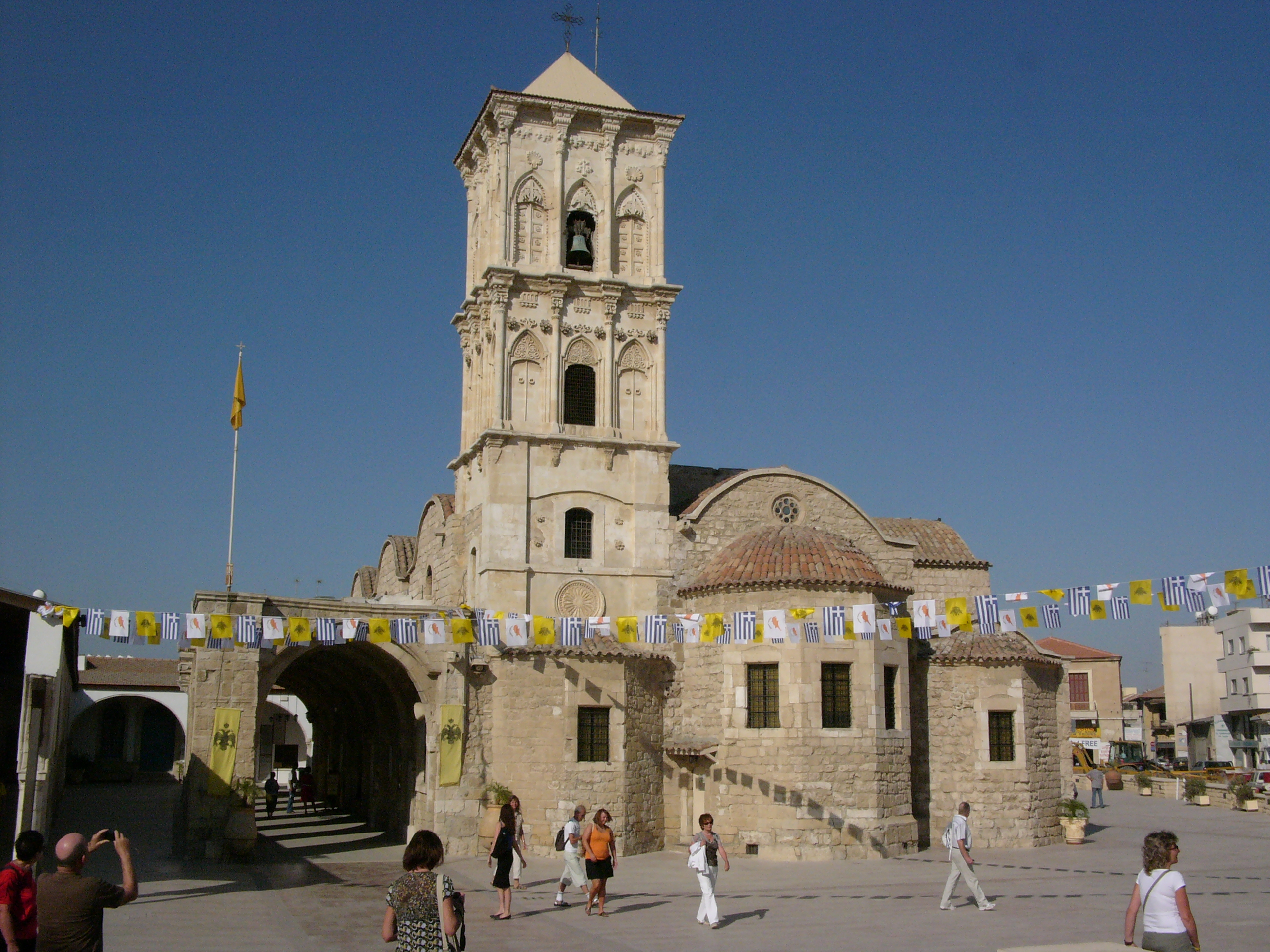
Church of Saint Lazarus, Larnaca

According to Eastern Orthodox Church tradition, sometime after the Resurrection of Christ, Lazarus was forced to flee Judea because of rumoured plots on his life (cf. John 12:10–11 for previous such plots) and came to Cyprus. There he was appointed by Barnabas and Paul the Apostle as the first bishop of Kition (present-day Larnaca). He lived there for thirty more years, and on his death was buried there for the second and last time.

Further establishing the apostolic nature of Lazarus' appointment was the story that the bishop's omophorion was presented to Lazarus by the Virgin Mary, who had woven it herself. Such apostolic connections were central to the claims to autocephaly made by the bishops of Kition—subject to the patriarch of Jerusalem—during the period 325–431. The church of Kition was declared self-governing in 431 AD at the Third Ecumenical Council.

According to tradition, Lazarus never smiled during the thirty years after his resurrection, worried by the sight of unredeemed souls he had seen during his four-day stay in Hell. The only exception happened when, seeing someone stealing a pot, he smilingly said: "the clay steals the clay."

In 890, a tomb was found in Larnaca bearing the inscription "Lazarus the friend of Christ". Emperor Leo VI of Byzantium had Lazarus' remains transferred to Constantinople in 898. The transfer was apostrophized by Arethas, bishop of Caesarea, and is commemorated by the Eastern Orthodox Church each year on 17 October.

In recompense to Larnaca, Emperor Leo had the Church of St. Lazarus, which still exists today, erected over Lazarus' tomb. The marble sarcophagus can be seen inside the church under the Holy of Holies.

In the 16th century, a Russian monk from the Monastery of Pskov visited Lazarus's tomb in Larnaca and took with him a small piece of the relics. Perhaps that piece led to the erection of the St. Lazarus chapel at the Pskov Monastery (Spaso-Eleazar Monastery, Pskov), (Note: (in Russian) Спасо-Елеазаровский монастырь. Russian Wikipedia.) where it is kept today.

In November 1972, human remains in a marble sarcophagus were discovered under the altar, during renovation works in the church of Church of St. Lazarus at Larnaca, and were identified as part of the saint's relics. (Note: In 1970 a fire that broke out in Church of St. Lazarus at Larnaca destroyed almost all of the internal furnishings of the church. Subsequent archaeological excavations and renovations led to the discovery of a portion of the saint's relics.)

In June 2012 the Church of Cyprus gave a part of the holy relics of Saint Lazarus to a delegation of the Russian Orthodox Church, led by Patriarch Kirill of Moscow and All Russia, after a four-day visit to Cyprus. The relics were brought to Moscow and were given to Archbishop Arseniy of Istra, who took them to the Zachatievsky monastery (Conception Convent), where they were put up for veneration.

=== Bishop of Marseille ===
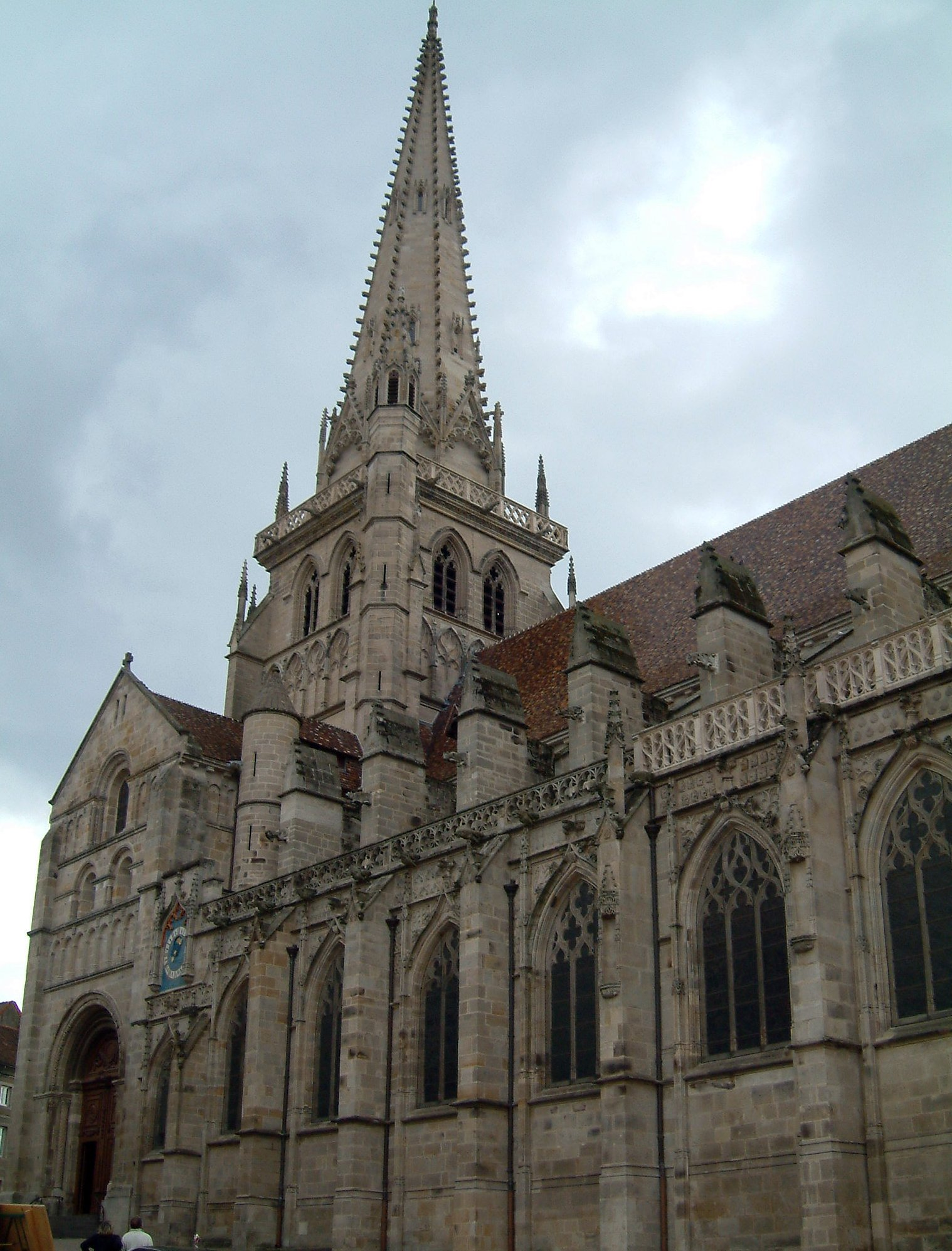
Autun Cathedral (Cathédrale Saint-Lazare d'Autun), Autun, France, also said to be built over the tomb of Lazarus

In the West, according to an alternative medieval tradition (centered in Provence), Lazarus, Mary, and Martha were "put out to sea by the Jews hostile to Christianity in a vessel without sails, oars, or helm, and after a miraculous voyage landed in Provence at a place called today the Saintes-Maries." The family is then said to separate and go in different parts of southeastern Gaul to preach; Lazarus goes to Marseille. Converting many people to Christianity there, he becomes the first Bishop of Marseille. During the persecution of Domitian, he is imprisoned and beheaded in a cave beneath the prison Saint-Lazare. His body is later translated to Autun, where he is buried in the Autun Cathedral, dedicated to Lazarus as Saint Lazare. However, the inhabitants of Marseille claim to be in possession of his head which they still venerate.

Pilgrims also visit another purported tomb of Lazarus at the Vézelay Abbey in Burgundy. The Abbey of the Trinity at Vendôme was said to hold a tear shed by Jesus at the tomb of Lazarus.

The Golden Legend, compiled in the 13th century, records the Provençal tradition. It also records a grand lifestyle imagined for Lazarus and his sisters (note that therein Lazarus' sister Mary is identified with Mary Magdalene):

Mary Magdalene had her surname of Magdalo, a castle, and was born of right noble lineage and parents, which were descended of the lineage of kings. And her father was named Cyrus, and her mother Eucharis. She with her brother Lazarus, and her sister Martha, possessed the castle of Magdalo, which is two miles from Nazareth, and Bethany, the castle which is nigh to Jerusalem, and also a great part of Jerusalem, which, all these things they departed among them. In such wise that Mary had the castle Magdalo, whereof she had her name Magdalene. And Lazarus had the part of the city of Jerusalem, and Martha had to her part Bethany. And when Mary gave herself to all delights of the body, and Lazarus entended all to knighthood, Martha, which was wise, governed nobly her brother's part and also her sister's, and also her own, and administered to knights, and her servants, and to poor men, such necessities as they needed. Nevertheless, after the ascension of our Lord, they sold all these things.

The 15th-century poet Georges Chastellain draws on the tradition of the unsmiling Lazarus: "He whom God raised, doing him such grace, the thief, Mary's brother, thereafter had naught but misery and painful thoughts, fearing what he should have to pass". (Le pas de la mort, VI).

== Liturgical commemorations ==
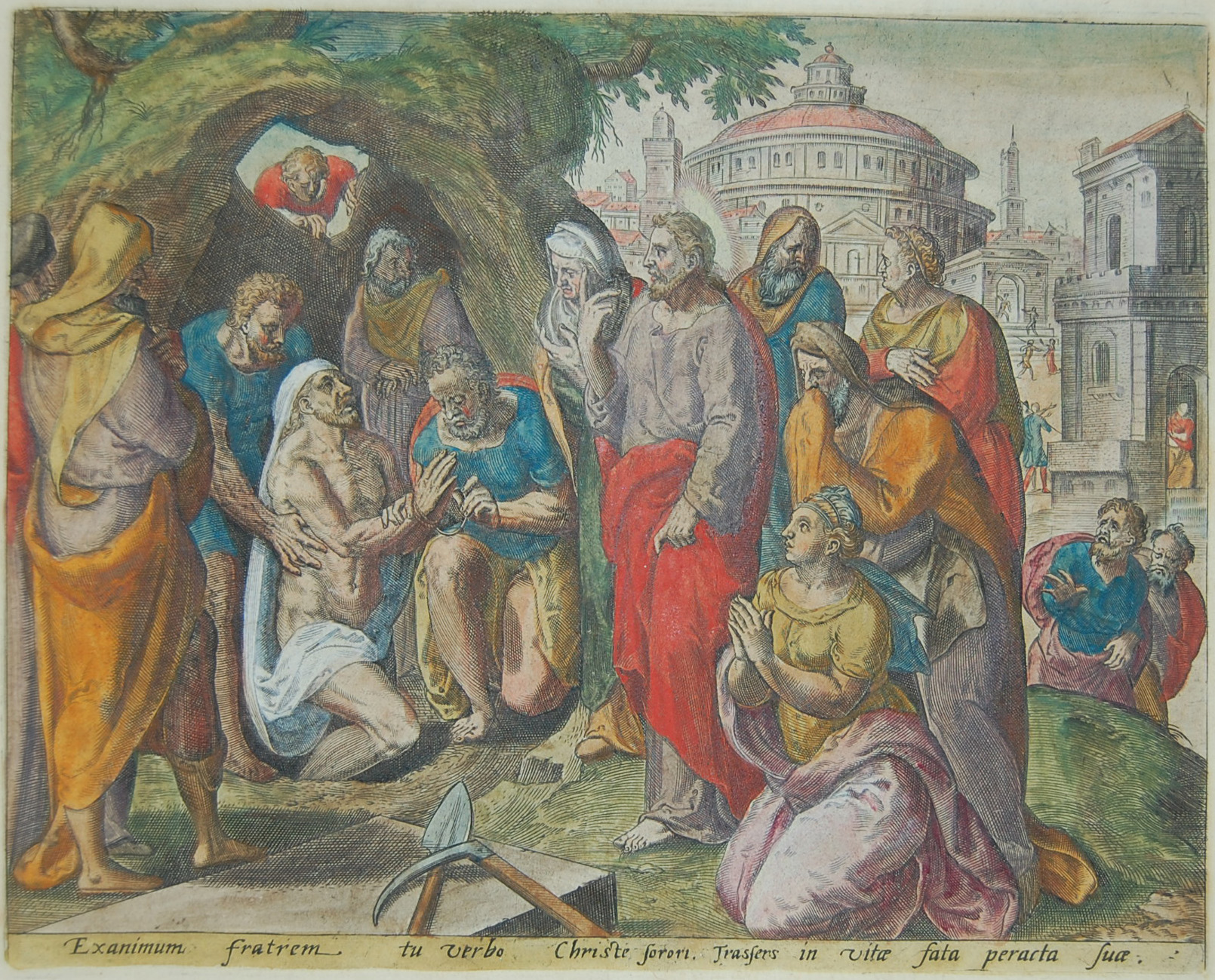
The raising of Lazarus by Johannes Wierix, 1585

Lazarus is honored as a saint by those Christian churches which keep the commemoration of saints, although on different days, according to local traditions.

In Christian funerals the idea of the deceased being raised by the Lord as Lazarus was raised is often expressed in prayer.

=== Eastern Orthodoxy ===
The Eastern Orthodox Church and Byzantine Catholic Church commemorate Lazarus on Lazarus Saturday, the day before Palm Sunday, which is a moveable feast day. This day, together with Palm Sunday, hold a unique position in the church year, as days of joy and triumph between the penitence of Great Lent and the mourning of Holy Week. During the preceding week, the hymns in the Lenten Triodion track the sickness and then the death of Lazarus, and Christ's journey from beyond Jordan to Bethany. The scripture readings and hymns for Lazarus Saturday focus on the resurrection of Lazarus as a foreshadowing of the Resurrection of Christ, and a promise of the General Resurrection. The Gospel narrative is interpreted in the hymns as illustrating the two natures of Christ: his humanity in asking, "Where have ye laid him?", and his divinity by commanding Lazarus to come forth from the dead.

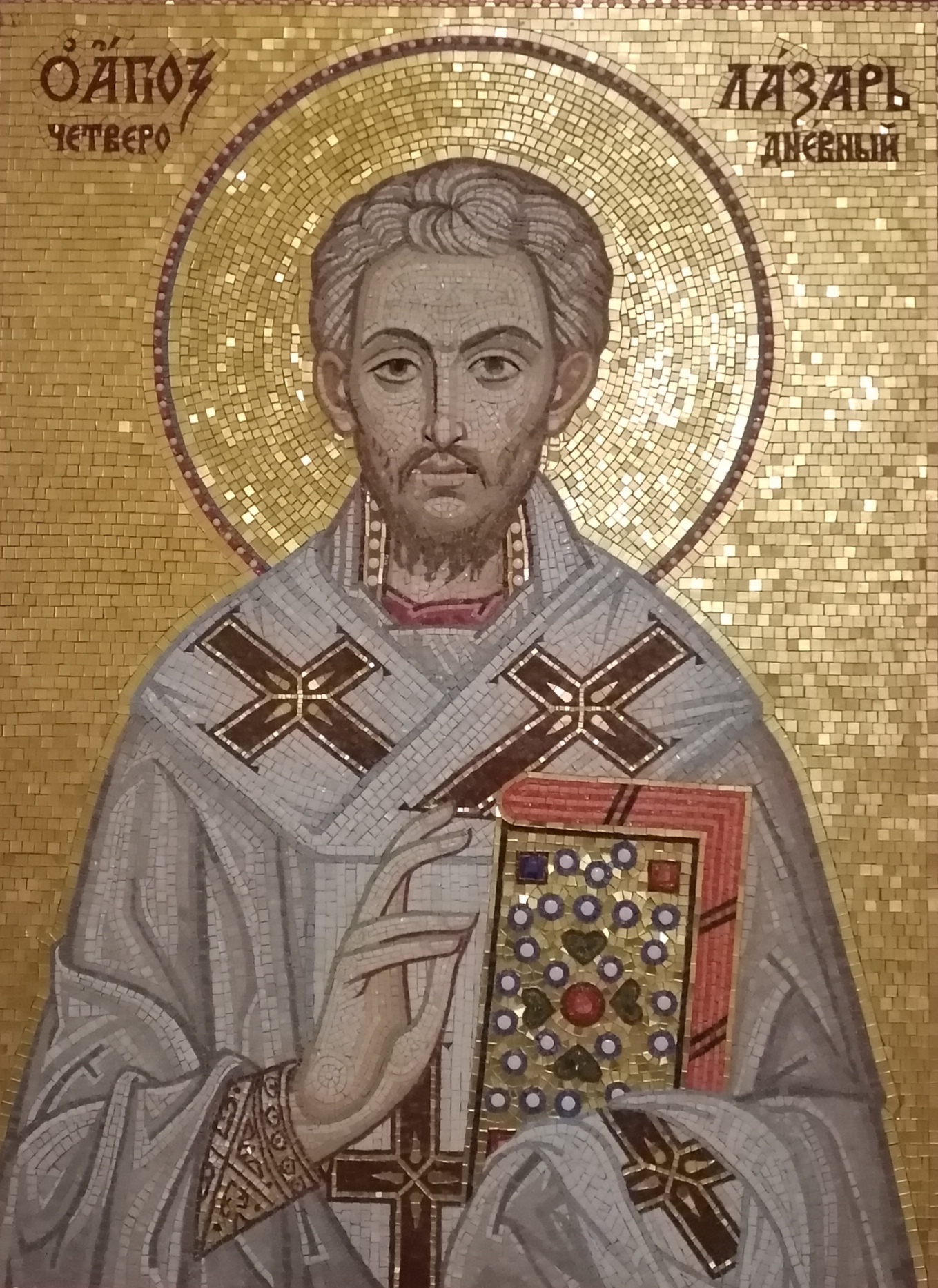
Lazarus, mosaic in Belgrade, Serbia

Many of the resurrectional hymns of the normal Sunday service which are omitted on Palm Sunday are chanted on Lazarus Saturday. During the Divine Liturgy, the Baptismal Hymn, "As many as have been baptized into Christ have put on Christ", is sung in place of the Trisagion. Although the forty days of Great Lent end on the day before Lazarus Saturday, the day is still observed as a fast; however, it is somewhat mitigated. In Russia, it is traditional to eat caviar on Lazarus Saturday.

Lazarus is also commemorated on the liturgical calendar of the Eastern Orthodox Church on the fixed feast day of 17 March, (Note: In the Synaxarion of Constantinople and in the Lavreotic Codex, reference is made to the "Raising of Lazarus" – the Holy and Just Lazarus, the friend of Christ. The entry for 17 October in the Prologue from Ohrid also states that "Lazarus's principle feasts are on 17 March and Lazarus Saturday during Great Lent.") while the translation of his relics from Cyprus to Constantinople in 898 AD is observed on 17 October. (Note: "...Under today's date is commemorated the translation of his relics from the island of Cyprus to Constantinople. This occurred when Emperor Leo the Wise built the Church of St. Lazarus in Constantinople, and translated Lazarus's relics there in the year 890. When, after almost a thousand years, Lazarus's grave in the town of Kition on Cyprus was unearthed, a marble tablet was found with the inscription: "Lazarus of the Four Days, the friend of Christ.")

=== Roman Catholicism ===
On the General Roman Calendar, Lazarus is celebrated, together with his sister Mary of Bethany and their sister Martha, on a memorial on 29 July. Earlier editions of the Roman Martyrology placed him among the saints of 17 December.

In Cuba, the celebration of San Lázaro on 17 December is a major festival. The date is celebrated with a pilgrimage to a chapel housing an image of Saint Lazarus, one of Cuba's most sacred icons, in the village of El Rincon, outside Havana.

=== Anglicanism ===
Lazarus is commemorated in the calendars of some Anglican provinces. Lazarus is remembered (with Martha and Mary) under the title "Mary, Martha, and Lazarus, Companions of Our Lord", on 29 July in the Church of England with a Lesser Festival and as such is provided with proper lectionary readings and collect.

=== Lutheranism ===
Lazarus is commemorated in the Calendar of Saints of the Lutheran Church on 29 July together with Mary and Martha.

== Conflation with the beggar Lazarus ==
The name "Lazarus" also appears in the Gospel of Luke in the story of Lazarus and Dives (Luke 16:19-31), which is attributed to Jesus. Also called "Dives and Lazarus", or "The Rich Man and the Beggar Lazarus", the narrative tells of the relationship (in life and in death) between an unnamed rich man and a poor beggar named Lazarus. In Hell, the dead rich man calls to Abraham in Heaven to send Lazarus from his side to warn the rich man's family against sharing his fate. Abraham replies, "If they do not listen to Moses and the Prophets, they will not be convinced even if someone rises from the dead."

Historically within Christianity, the begging Lazarus of the parable (feast day 21 June) and Lazarus of Bethany have sometimes been conflated, with both being depicted in iconography with sores and crutches.

Romanesque iconography carved on portals in Burgundy and Provence might be indicative of such a conflation. For example, at the west portal of the Church of St. Trophime at Arles, the beggar Lazarus is enthroned as Saint Lazarus. Similar examples are found at the church at Avallon, the central portal at Vézelay, and the portals of the cathedral of Autun.

=== Order of Saint Lazarus ===
The Order of Saint Lazarus of Jerusalem is an order of chivalry that originated in a leper hospital founded by Knights Hospitaller in the 12th century by Crusaders of the Latin Kingdom of Jerusalem. Sufferers of leprosy regarded the beggar Lazarus (of Luke 16:19-31) as their patron saint and usually dedicated their hospices to him.

== In Islam ==
Lazarus also appeared in medieval Islamic tradition, in which he was honored as a pious companion of Jesus. Although the Quran mentions no figure named Lazarus, among the miracles with which it credits Jesus includes the raising of people from the dead (QS. Al-Imran [3]:49). Muslim lore frequently detailed these miraculous narratives of Jesus, but mentioned Lazarus only occasionally. Al-Ṭabarī, for example, in his Taʾrīk̲h̲ talks of these miracles in general. Al-T̲h̲aʿlabī, however, related, closely following the Gospel of John: "Lazarus [Al-ʿĀzir] died, his sister sent to inform Jesus, Jesus came three (in the Gospel, four) days after his death, went with his sister to the tomb in the rock and caused Lazarus to arise; children were born to him". Similarly, in Ibn al-At̲h̲īr, the resurrected man is called "ʿĀzir", which is another Arabic rendering of "Lazarus".

== Lazarus as Babalu Aye in Santería ==
Via syncretism, Lazarus (or more precisely the conflation of the two figures named "Lazarus") has become an important figure in Santería as the Yoruba deity Babalu Aye. Like the beggar of the Christian Gospel of Luke, Babalu-Aye represents someone covered with sores licked by dogs who was healed by divine intervention. Silver charms known as the crutch of St. Lazarus or standard Roman Catholic–style medals of St. Lazarus are worn as talismans to invoke the aid of the syncretized deity in cases of medical suffering, particularly for people with AIDS. In Santería, the date associated with Saint Lazarus is 17 December, despite Santería's reliance on the iconography associated with the begging saint whose feast day is 21 June.

== Depictions in art ==
The raising of Lazarus is a popular subject in religious art. Two of the most famous paintings are those of Michelangelo Merisi da Caravaggio (c. 1609) and Sebastiano del Piombo (1516). Among other prominent depictions of Lazarus are works by Rembrandt, Van Gogh, Ivor Williams, and Lazarus Breaking His Fast by Walter Sickert.

The Raising of Lazarus is one of the most popular artistic themes in the Catacombs of Rome including examples from the 2nd century.

Depictions of the Resurrection of Lazarus in art

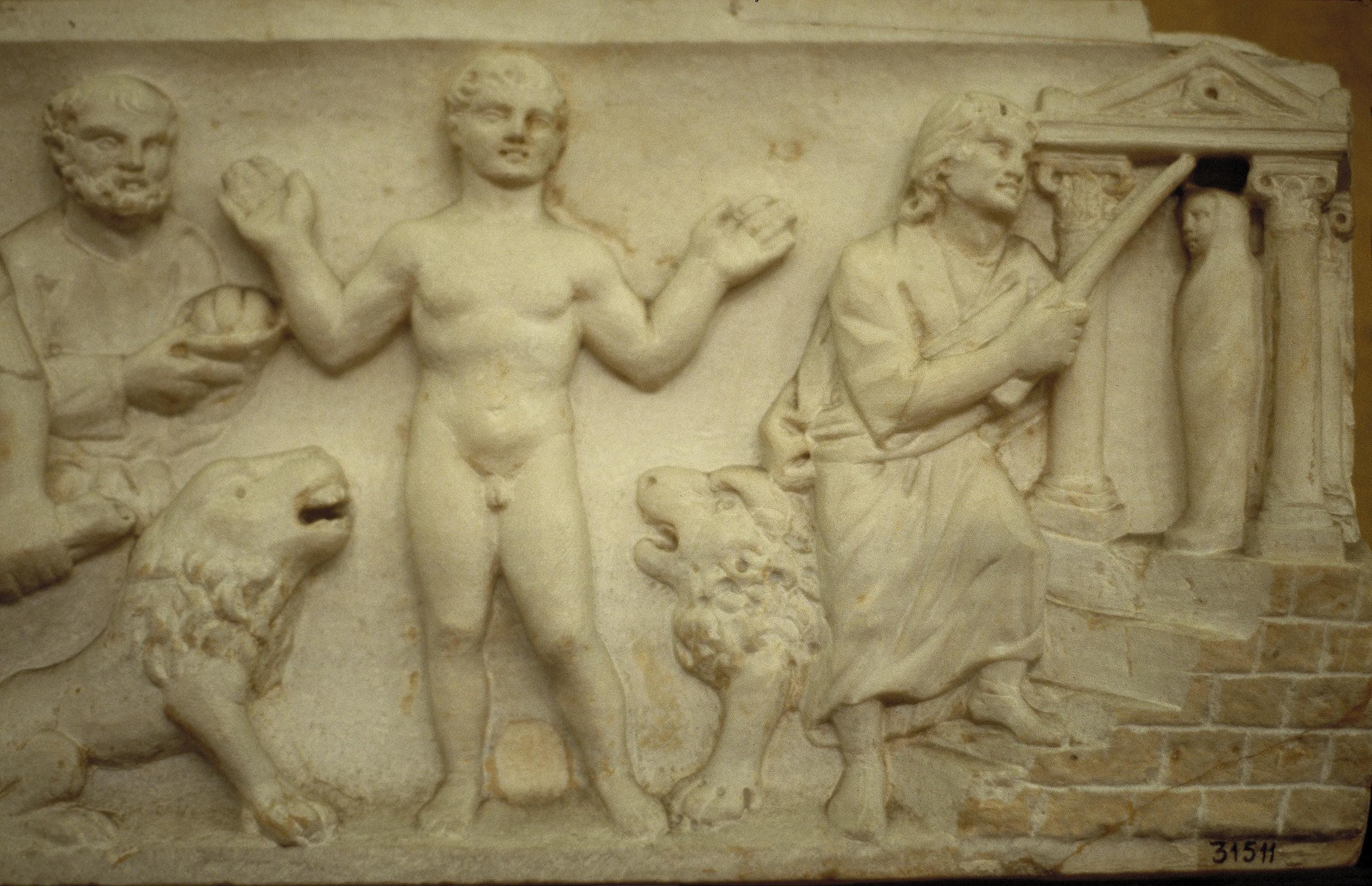
Early Christian sarcophagus relief: Daniel in the Lions' Den and the Raising of Lazarus

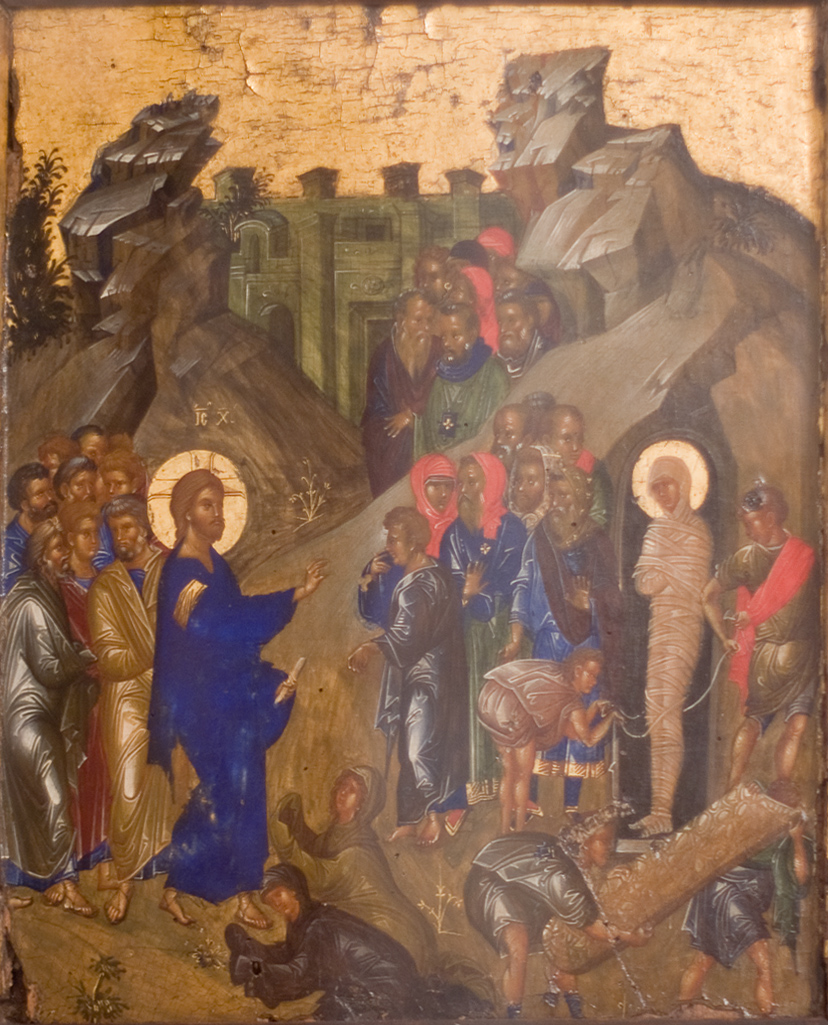
The Resurrection of Lazarus, Byzantine icon, late 14th – early 15th century (From the Collection of G. Gamon-Gumun, Russian museum)

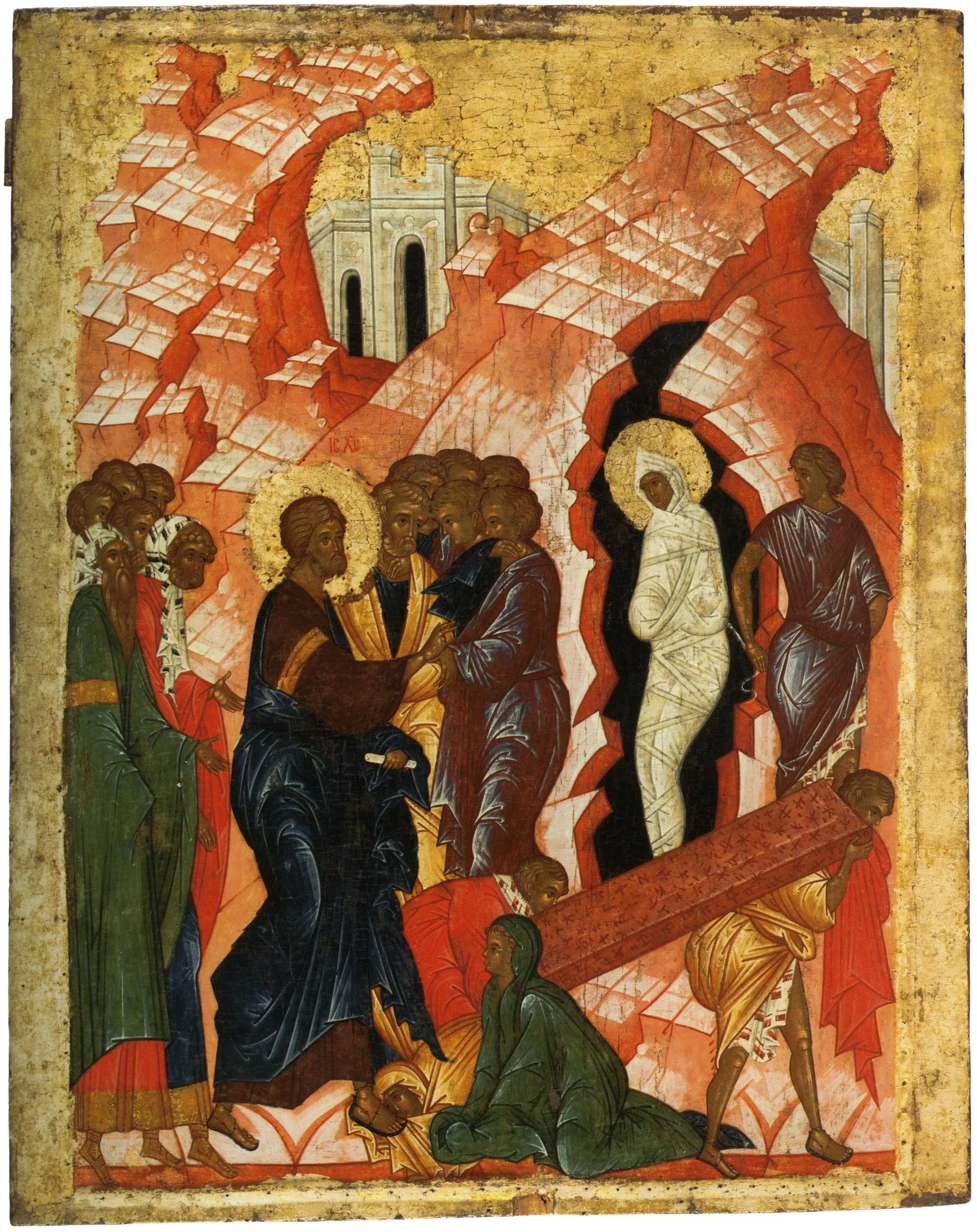
The Resurrection of Lazarus, Russian icon, 15th century, Novgorod school (State Russian Museum, Saint Petersburg)

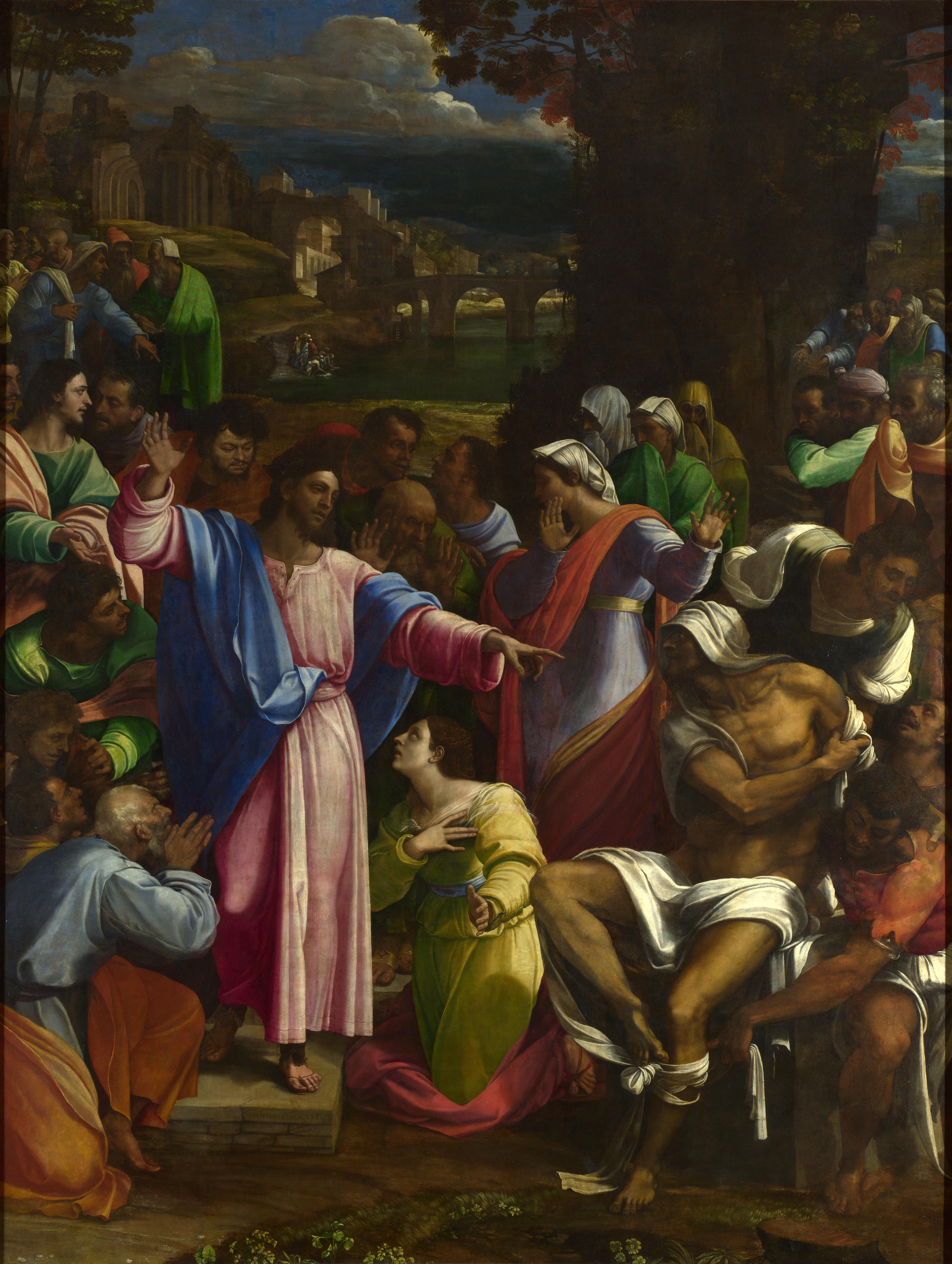
The Raising of Lazarus, Oil on canvas, c. 1517–1519, Sebastiano del Piombo (National Gallery, London)

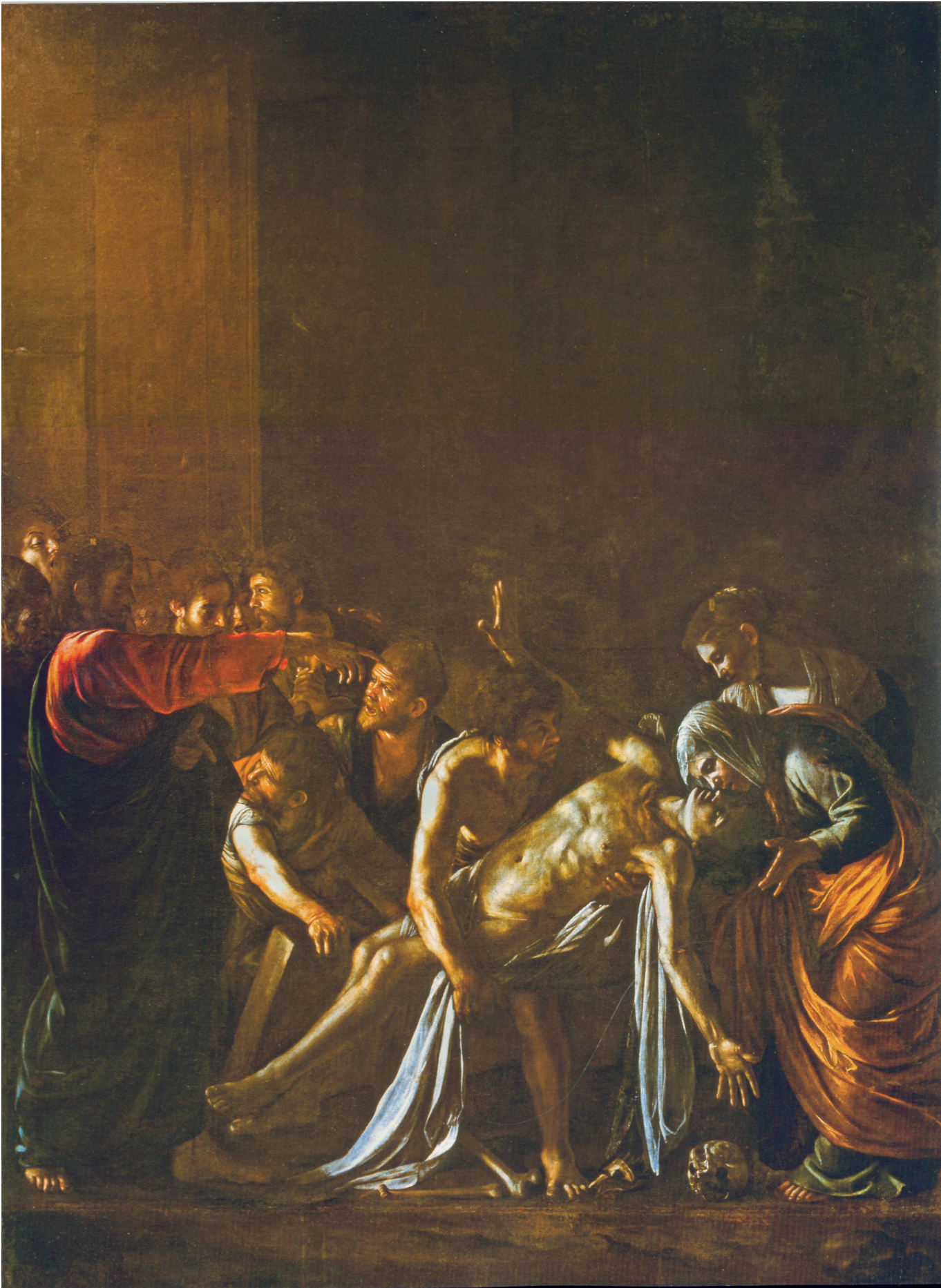
The Raising of Lazarus, Oil on canvas, c. 1609, Michelangelo Merisi da Caravaggio (Museo Regionale, Messina)

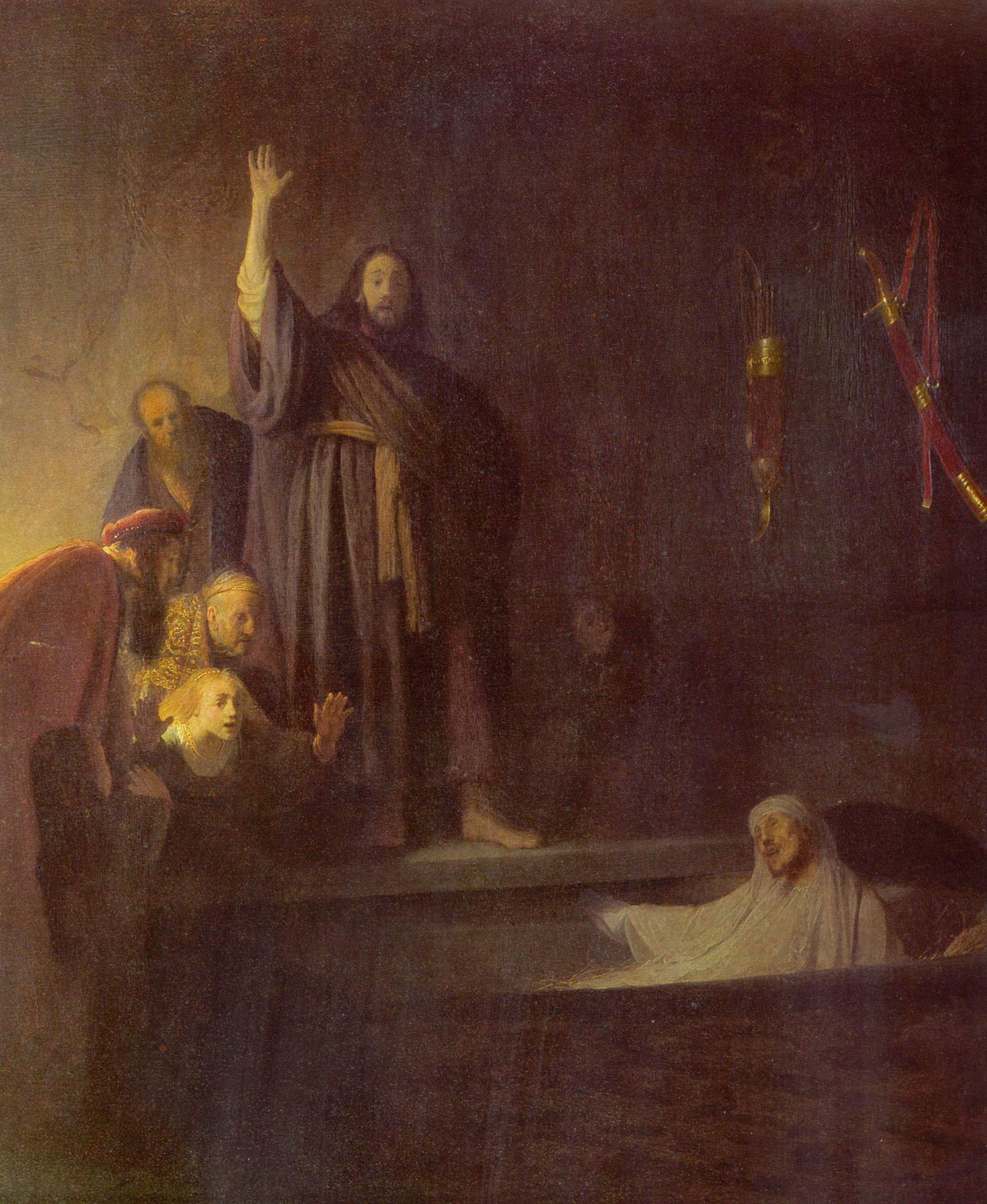
The Raising of Lazarus, 1630–1631, Rembrandt van Rijn (Los Angeles County Museum of Art, Los Angeles)

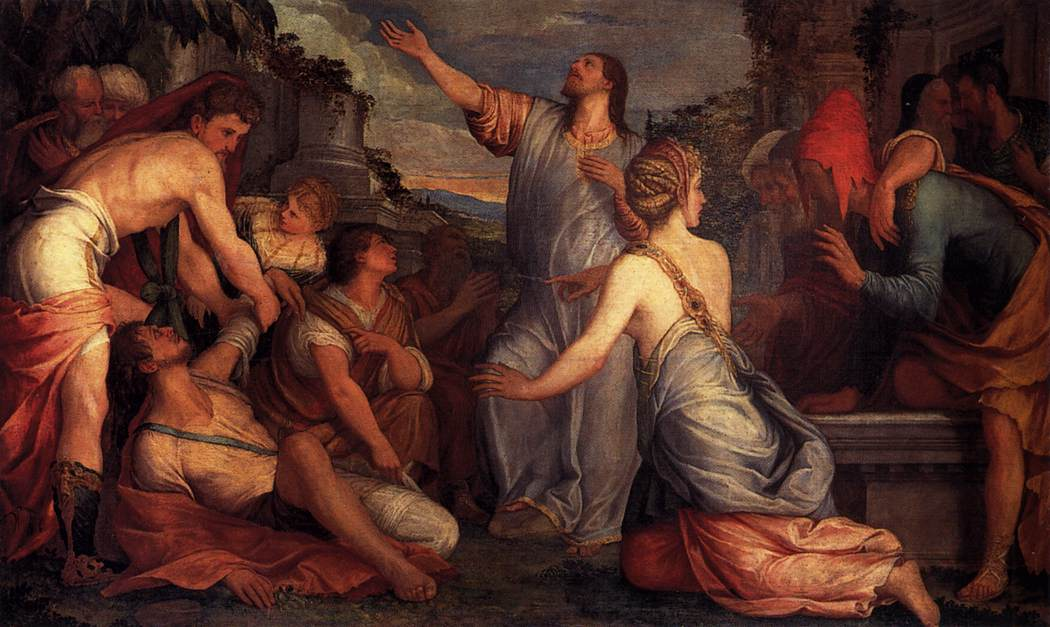
The Raising of Lazarus, 1540–1545, Giuseppe Salviati

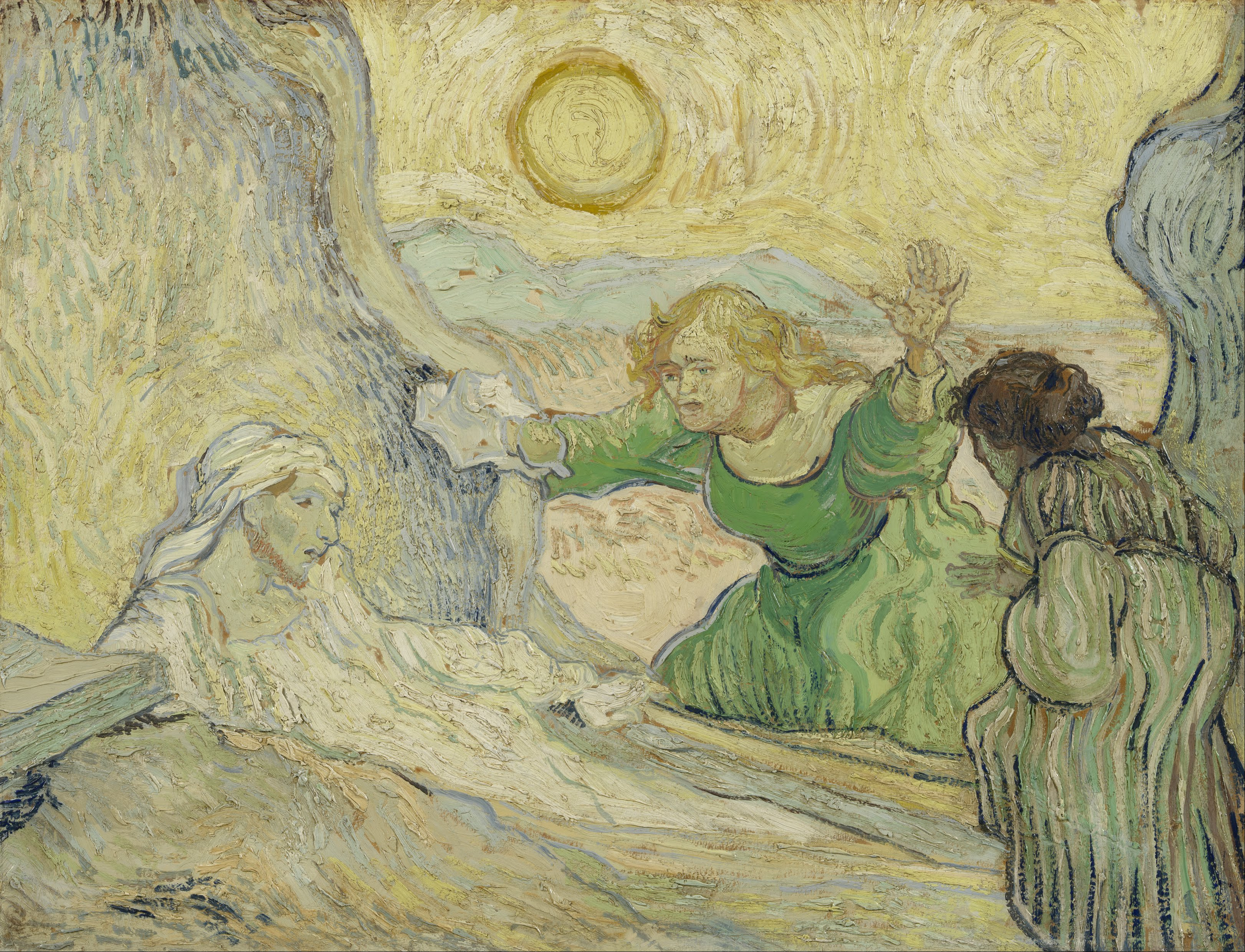
The Raising of Lazarus (after Rembrandt), Oil on paper, 1890, Vincent van Gogh (Van Gogh Museum, Amsterdam)

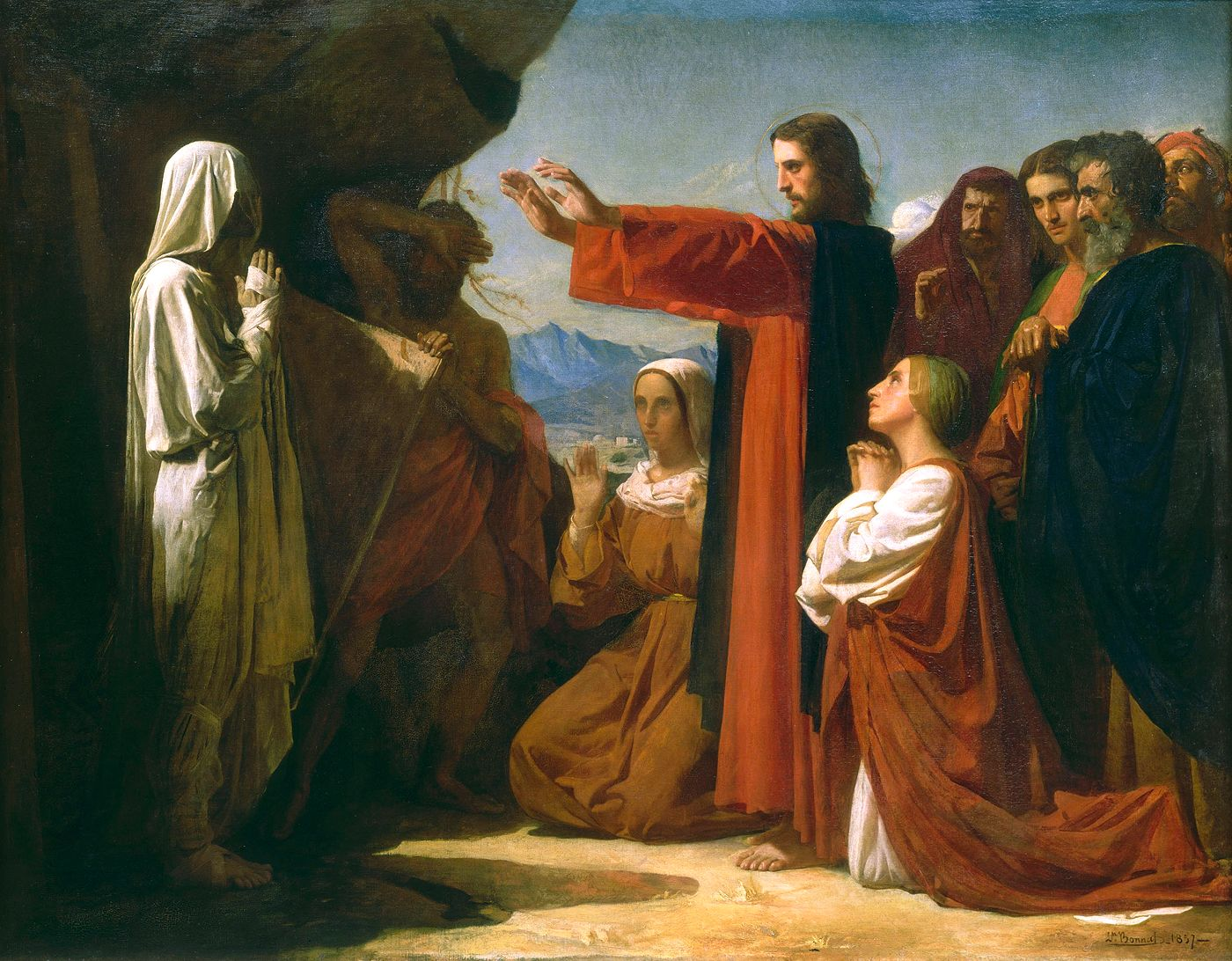
The Raising of Lazarus, 1857, Léon Joseph Florentin Bonnat

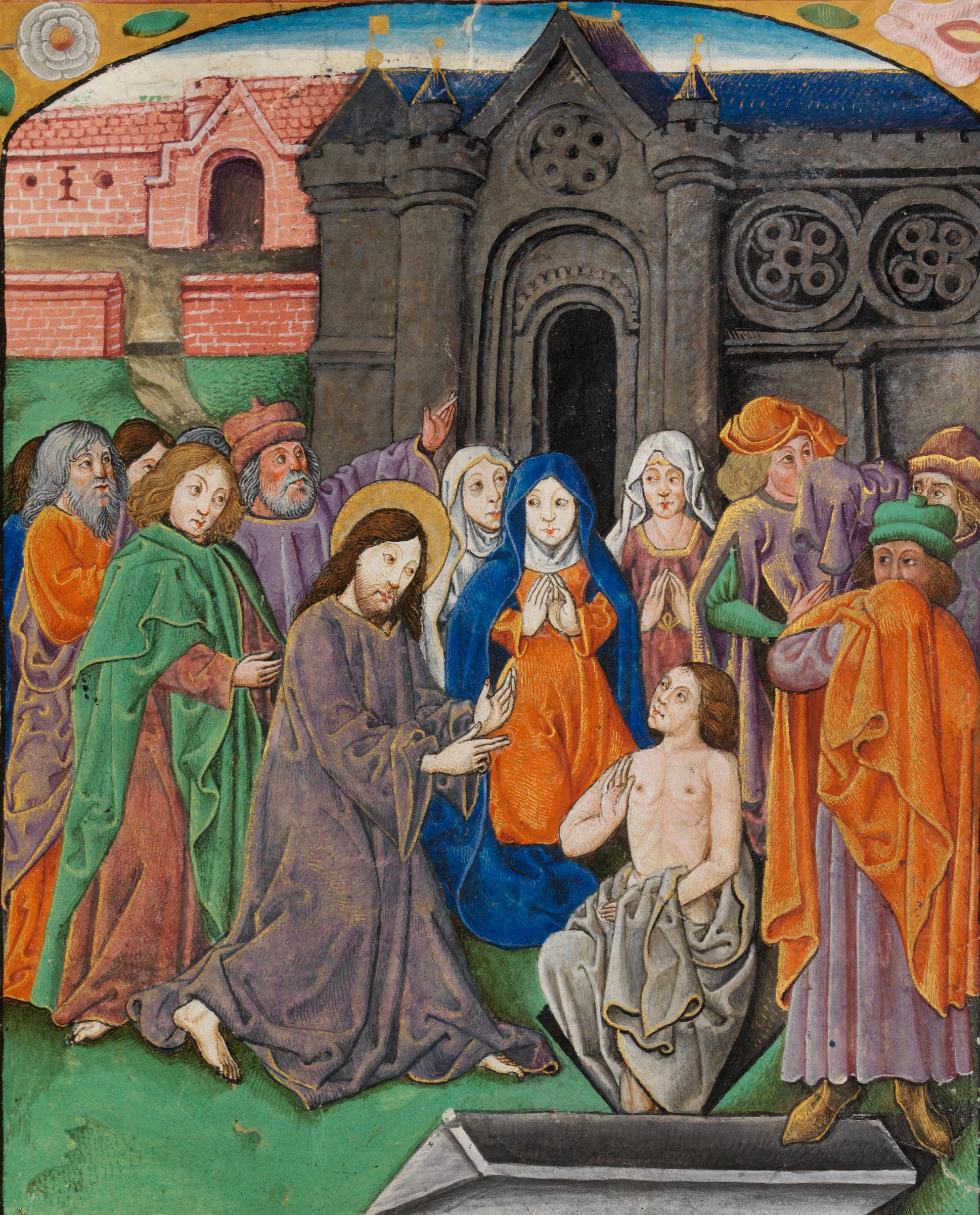
The Raising of Lazarus illumination on parchment, c. 1504

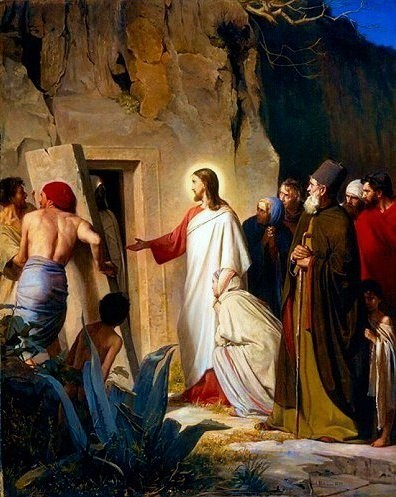
Raising Lazarus, Oil on Copper Plate, 1875, Carl Heinrich Bloch (Hope Gallery, Salt Lake City)

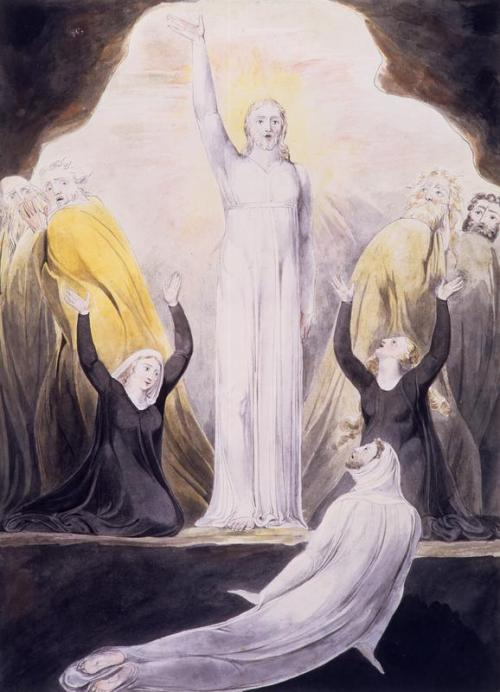
The Raising of Lazarus, 1800, William Blake, Aberdeen Art Gallery

== Cultural references ==
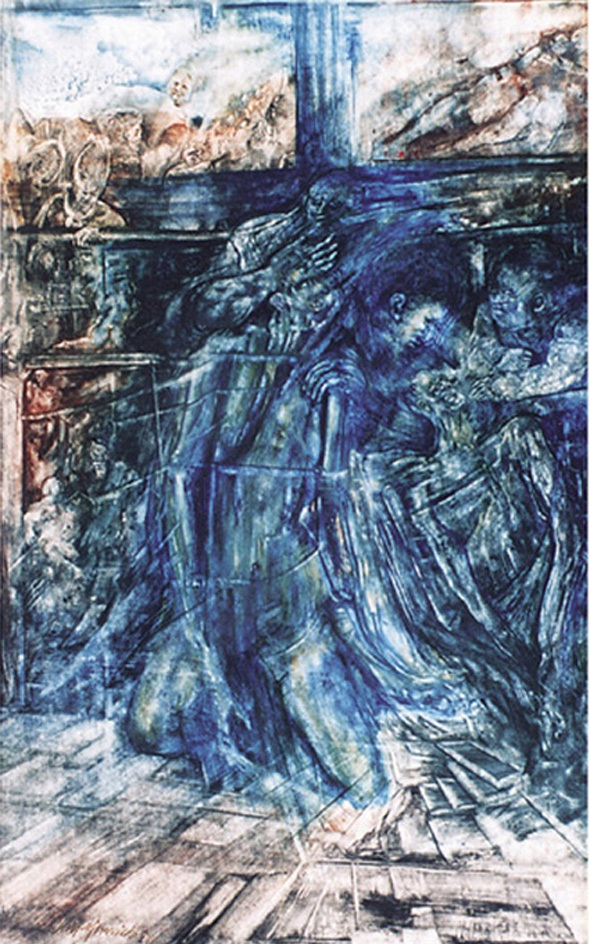
Resurrection of Lazarus by Mauricio García Vega

Well known in Western culture from their respective biblical tales, both figures named Lazarus (Lazarus of Bethany and the Beggar Lazarus of "Lazarus and Dives"), have appeared many times in music, writing and art. The majority of the references are to Lazarus of Bethany.

=== In literature ===
In the 1851 novel Moby-Dick by Herman Melville, after writing his will and testament for the fourth time, Ishmael remarks that, "all the days I should now live would be as good as the days that Lazarus lived after his resurrection; a supplementary clean gain of so many months or weeks as the case might be."

In Fyodor Dostoevsky's 1866 novel Crime and Punishment, the protagonist Raskolnikov asks his lover Sonia to read this section of John's Gospel for him. Raskolnikov reads the same passage again in the novel's epilogue.

In two short stories written by Mark Twain and posthumously published in 1972, a lawyer argues that Lazarus' heirs had an indisputable claim to any property the resurrected Lazarus had owned before his death.

Playwright Eugene O'Neill in 1925 wrote the play Lazarus Laughed, his largest-cast play, presenting Lazarus' life after his resurrection. The play has only been produced once in full, though in reduced-cast versions at other times.

Many works of literature from the 20th century allude to Lazarus, including Truman Capote's short story "A Tree of Night" in A Tree of Night and Other Stories (1945) and John Knowles's novel A Separate Peace (1959). Allusions in 20th-century poetry occur in works such as Leonid Andreyev's novella Lazarus (1906), T.S. Eliot's poem "The Love Song of J. Alfred Prufrock" (1915), Edwin Arlington Robinson's poem "Lazarus" (1920), and Sylvia Plath's poem "Lady Lazarus" published in her posthumous anthology Ariel (1965). An allusion to Lazarus also appears in the memoir Witness (1952) by Whittaker Chambers (who acknowledged the influence of Dostoevsky's works), which opens its first chapter, "In 1937, I began, like Lazarus, the impossible return."

Science fiction allusions to Lazarus occur in Robert A. Heinlein's Lazarus Long novels (1941–1987), Walter M. Miller Jr.'s A Canticle for Leibowitz (1960), and Frank Herbert's The Lazarus Effect (1983).

In the 2010 book The Big Questions: A Short Introduction to Philosophy written by American professors of philosophy Kathleen Higgins and Robert C. Solomon, at the end of Chapter 5, The Search for Truth, readers are asked to consider: "Could a scientist give an adequate account of the biblical story of the raising of Lazarus?"

Lazarus Is Dead (2011) by Richard Beard is an innovative novel. It amplifies a detail of the Gospel: Lazarus was Jesus's friend; however Jesus has disciples, but not many friends. Beard traces the story back to Jesus and Lazarus's childhood in Nazareth. After, the two friends' paths have diverged. The novel was described by the Sunday Business Post as "no ordinary novel: it is a brilliant, genre-bending retelling and subversion of one of the oldest, most sensational stories in the western canon."

John Derhak's The Bones of Lazarus (2012), is a darkly funny, fast-paced, supernatural thriller that traces intersecting lives on a war-torn, resource rich, Caribbean island. The plot revolves around the premise that Lazarus of Bethany, upon his resurrection by Christ, becomes an immortal creature of Judgment, seeking the hearts and souls of the wicked throughout time.

Larry: A Novel of Church Recovery (2019) by Brian L. Boley is a short novel, in which a character named "Larry" appears. "Larry" gives suggestions to a pair of pastors about improving their churches and leading them to growth. But as we read along, we begin to understand that "Larry" may actually be the biblical Lazarus of Bethany, an immortal evangelistic servant of Jesus.

Richard Zimler's bestselling novel The Gospel According to Lazarus (2019 in English) is written from the perspective of Lazarus himself. The book presents Yeshua ben Yosef (Jesus' Hebrew name) as an early Jewish mystic and explores the deep friendship between Lazarus and Yeshua, who - within the fictional setting - have been best friends since childhood. The themes of the book include how we cope with a loss of faith, the terrible sacrifices we make for those we love, the transcendent meaning of Yeshua's mission, and how we go on after suffering a shattering trauma. The Observer review summarized the novel as "A very human tale of rivalry, betrayal, power-grabbing and sacrifice.... Perhaps the most remarkable aspect of this brave and engaging novel...is that Zimler manages to make the best-known narrative in western culture a page-turner."

=== In music ===
In music, a popular retelling of the biblical Lazarus story from the point of view of Lazarus in heaven is the 1984 gospel story-song "Lazarus Come Forth" by Contemporary Christian Music artist Carman. A modern reinterpretation of the story is the title track to the album Dig, Lazarus, Dig!!! by the Australian alternative band Nick Cave and the Bad Seeds. Several other bands have composed songs titled "Lazarus" in allusion to the resurrection story, including Porcupine Tree, Conor Oberst, Circa Survive, Chimaira, moe., Wes King, Placebo, and David Bowie (written while he was terminally ill).

=== In popular culture ===
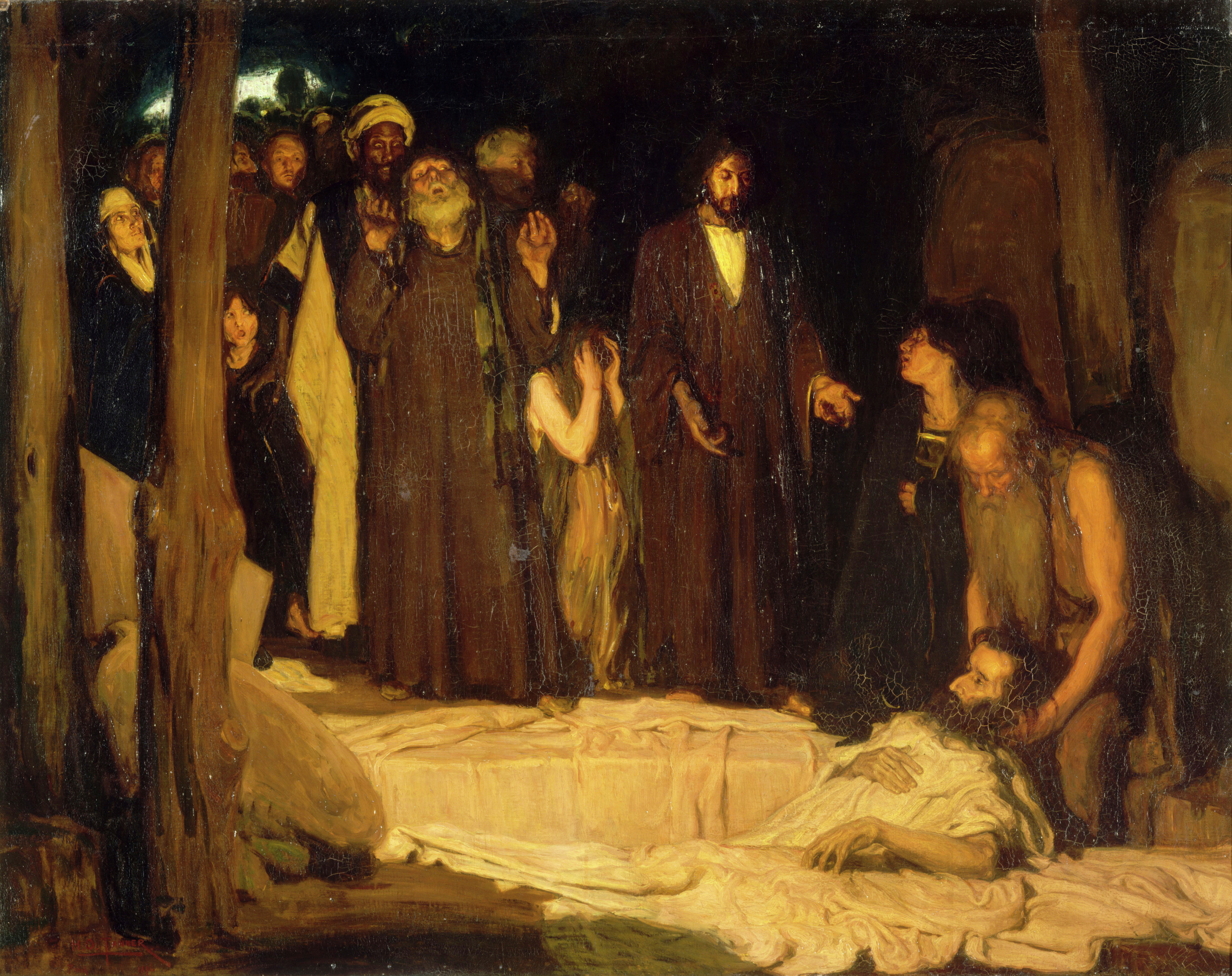
In the 1896, artist Henry Ossawa Tanner brought Lazarus to the forefront of popular culture in Paris, entering Resurrection of Lazarus in the Paris Salon, winning a medal. It was so respected that the French government bought the painting.

Lazarus is sometimes referenced in political figures returning to power in unlikely circumstances. When John Howard lost the leadership of the Liberal Party of Australia, he rated his chances of regaining it as "Lazarus with a triple bypass". Howard did regain the leadership and went on to become Prime Minister of Australia. Former President of Haiti, Jean Bertrand Aristide, was termed the "Haitian Lazarus" by journalist Amy Wilentz, in her description of his return to Haiti from exile and the political significance of this event.

In the Batman comic book series, Ra's al Ghul is often restored to life by a pool known as the Lazarus Pit.

A futuristic, dystopian, four-part television series set in the 24th century, Cold Lazarus, was written by Dennis Potter when he was terminally ill with pancreatic cancer. A 20th-century writer, Danial Feeld, is cryogenically frozen, and the plot revolves around attempts to resurrect his thoughts from his frozen head.

In the 2007 Doctor Who episode "The Lazarus Experiment", has Professor Richard Lazarus demonstrate an experiment that causes him to look like a younger man, before an error in his work turns him into a life-force sucking monster.

In the 2014 indie roguelike video game, The Binding of Isaac, one of the playable characters is called Lazarus; this character is resurrected after death once each floor in the game.

== See also ==
- Lazarus of Bethany, patron saint archive
- Corpse decomposition
- Lazarus Saturday
- Ministry of Jesus
- Panagia Alexiotissa, Patras
- Seven signs in the Gospel of John
- Category:Paintings of the Resurrection of Lazarus
