= Klaus Schäfer =

German catholic theologian, priest and author

- Born: 1958 (age 67–68)
- Occupations: Priest, writer

Klaus Schäfer SAC (born 1958) is a German Catholic theologian, priest and author. As a Pallotine Father, he is known by the abbreviation of the order SAC after his name. The focus of his work is attending the sick and terminal care for the dying as well as helping those mourning. He has published many books on such themes as stillbirth, brain death and organ donation as well as travelogues on pilgrimage by bicycle.

== Life and work ==
After his time at school Schäfer studied to be an electrical engineer, after which he served for twelve years as a soldier in the German Bundeswehr. In 1988 he joined the Pallotine Order and after training and study was ordained as a priest (German Priesterweihe.) As a Pallottiner the abbreviation SAC was added after his name (for the Latin Societas Apostolatus Catholici, translated as "Community of the Catholic Apostles") in the form of a Postnominale.

In 1999 Peter Schäfer was a church minister in Kippenhausen in Baden-Württemberg, after which he worked as a hospital chaplain at the Vincentius-Hospital in Karlsruhe. From 2014 to 2017 Schäfer was rector of the congregation in Bruchsal.

As hospital chaplain he was founder of the Karlsruhe Solace Church Service. Since 2017 he has been hospital chaplain at the University Clinic in Regensburg. He is much in demand as a speaker and debater on the themes of brain death and organ donation.

Schäfer runs several internet sites on various topics:

- Schäfer-SAC.de – in which he campaigns for peace. He also has the care of war graves very much at heart. Pictures of 200 military cemeteries are to be found on this web site.
- SantiagoWiki.eu – here he gives information about pilgrimage routes to Santiago de Compostela (from/via Paris, Vézelay, Le Puy, Arles and various routes in Spain) with numerous pictures and documents.
- Organspende-Wiki.de – here he has endeavoured since January 2014 to give factually correct and comprehensive elucidation about brain death and organ donation.

== Selected publications ==
- Trösten – aber wie? Ein Leitfaden zur Begleitung von Trauernden und Kranken. Regensburg 2009 ISBN 978-3-7917-2204-7.
- Trauerfeiern beim Tod von Kindern: liturgische Hilfen und Modelle für Segnung, Verabschiedung und Beerdigung. Regensburg 2010 ISBN 978-3-7917-2299-3.
- Sterben – aber wie? Leitfaden für einen guten Umgang mit dem Tod. Pustet, Regensburg 2011, ISBN 978-3791723815.
- Leben – dank dem Spender 20 Transplantierte berichten. Books on Demand 2014, ISBN 978-3734741463.
- Hirntod, Medizinische Fakten – diffuse Ängste – Hilfen für Angehörige. Topos plus 2014, ISBN 978-3836708791.
- 25 x 25 geschenkte Jahre 25 Transplantierte berichten über die mindestens 25 Jahre ihres 2. Lebens. Books on Demand 2015, ISBN 978-3734785337.
- JA, Mein Bekenntnis zur Organspende. Pallotti 2016 ISBN 978-3876140353.
- Gottesbilder des Korans und der Bibel, Die 99 Namen Allah's im Koran im Vergleich zu den biblischen Gottesbildern. Books on Demand 2016, ISBN 978-3837009064.
- Vom Koma zum Hirntod: Pflege und Begleitung auf der Intensivstation. Kohlhammer Verlag, Stuttgart 2017 ISBN 978-3-17-033090-0.

=== Freebooks ===
- 2016 Der Ausweis.
- 2017 Hirntod verstehen.
