= Panagia Alexiotissa, Patras =

Panagia Alexiotissa
- Παναγία Αλεξιώτισσα
- 38°14′18″N 21°44′57″E
- Location: Patras, Achaia
- Country: Greece
- Language: Greek
- Denomination: Greek Orthodox

History
- Status: Open

Architecture
- Completed: 1805

Administration
- Metropolis: Metropolis of Patras

The Panagia Alexiotissa (Greek: Παναγία Αλεξιώτισσα) is a church in the Greek city of Patras with a cemetery in its forecourt, which is located between 12ou Syntagmatos and Marangopoulou streets. The local neighbourhood is named after the church as Agia Alexiotissa (Αγία Αλεξιώτισσα).

== Historical evidence ==
The church has a special historical significance as it played an important role during the period of the late Turkish rule. Its opening ceremony took place in 1805. In 1821, on Palm Sunday, the Turks burned alive (or slaughtered) the local priest, Georgios, while he was celebrating the Divine Liturgy, which he did not interrupt despite the news of their arrival. Today, a monument has been placed in the forecourt area of the church in his memory.

The chapels of Saint Lazarus and Saint Anne also belong to its ecclesiastical complex.

In the adjacent cemetery, which is the 3rd Municipal Cemetery of the city, are the tombstones of Olympic champion Nikolaos Andriakopoulos and politician Achilleas Gerokostopoulos.
