= The Bones of Lazarus =

Paranormal suspense novel by John Derhak

- Book cover
- Authors: John Derhak
- Cover artist: Edward W. Derhak
- Language: English
- Genre: Paranormal, suspense
- Publisher: Back Channel Press
- Publication date: 2012
- Publication place: United States
- Media type: Print (paperback)
- Pages: 266
- ISBN: 978-1934582503

The Bones of Lazarus (Back Channel Press, 2012) is a novel by John Derhak. Originally a short story that appeared in Chill Your Cockles (2008), The Bones of Lazarus is also the title of a song by the rock band, moe., from the 2012 studio album, What Happened to the La Las. The song was named in recognition of the novel.

== Plot summary ==
The Bones of Lazarus is a fast-paced, supernatural thriller and mystery that traces intersecting lives on a war-torn, resource rich, Caribbean island. The plot revolves around the premise that Lazarus of Bethany, upon his resurrection by the hand of Christ, becomes an immortal creature of Judgment, seeking the hearts and souls of the wicked throughout time.

== Major themes ==
Themes explored by Derhak include political and social manipulation, terrorism, arms proliferation, the selling of news as entertainment, plunder of natural resources, and religious exploitation.
