= Lazarus phenomenon =

Medical phenomenon

- Other names: Lazarus syndrome, Lazarus effect, Lazarus heart, autoresuscitation after failed cardiopulmonary resuscitation
- Specialty: Cardiology

Lazarus phenomenon is the spontaneous return of a normal cardiac activity after a person has been pronounced dead. It was named by Jack G. Bray in 1993 referring to Lazarus of Bethany who, according to the New Testament, was raised from the dead by Jesus. It is also used to refer to the spontaneous return of cardiac rhythm after failed attempts at resuscitation; as such it is called autoresuscitation after failed cardiopulmonary resuscitation. The phenomenon was first described in medical journals in 1982, and has been noted at least 38 times since then.

Occurrences of the syndrome are extremely rare, and the causes are not well understood. One hypothesis for the phenomenon is that a chief factor (though not the only one) is the buildup of pressure in the chest as a result of cardiopulmonary resuscitation (CPR). The relaxation of pressure after resuscitation efforts have ended is thought to allow the heart to expand, triggering the heart's electrical impulses and restarting the heartbeat. Other possible factors are hyperkalemia or high doses of adrenaline.

== Notable cases ==
- A 27-year-old man in the UK collapsed after overdosing on heroin and cocaine. Paramedics gave him a naloxone injection, and he recovered enough to walk to the ambulance. He went into cardiac arrest in transit. After 25 minutes of resuscitation efforts, the patient was verbally declared dead. About a minute after resuscitation ended, a nurse noticed a rhythm on the heart monitor and resuscitation was resumed. The patient recovered fully.
- A 66-year-old man suffering from a suspected abdominal aneurysm suffered cardiac arrest and received chest compressions and defibrillation shocks for 17 minutes during treatment for his condition. Vital signs did not return; the patient was declared dead and resuscitation efforts ended. Ten minutes later, the surgeon felt a pulse. The aneurysm was successfully treated, and the patient fully recovered with no lasting physical or neurological problems.
- According to a 2002 article in the journal Forensic Science International, a 65-year-old prelingually deaf Japanese man was found unconscious in the public home he lived in. CPR was attempted on the scene by home staff, emergency medical personnel and also in the emergency department of the hospital and included appropriate medications and defibrillation. He was declared dead after attempted resuscitation. However, a policeman found him moving in the mortuary after 20 minutes. The patient survived for 4 more days.
- Judith Johnson, 61, went into cardiac arrest at Beebe Medical Center in Lewes, Delaware, United States, in May 2007. She was given "multiple medicines and synchronized shocks", but never regained a pulse. She was declared dead at 8:34 p.m. but was later discovered to be alive and breathing. She sued the medical center where it happened for damages due to physical and neurological problems stemming from the event.
- A 45-year-old woman in Colombia was pronounced dead, as there were no vital signs showing she was alive. Later, a funeral worker noticed the woman moving and alerted his co-worker that the woman should go back to the hospital.
- A 65-year-old man in Malaysia regained vital signs two-and-a-half hours after doctors at Seberang Jaya Hospital, Penang, pronounced him dead. He died three weeks later.
- Anthony Yahle, 37, in Bellbrook, Ohio, United States, was breathing abnormally at 4:00 a.m. on 5 August 2013, and could not be woken. After finding that Yahle had no pulse, first responders administered CPR and were able to retrieve a stable-enough heartbeat to transport him to the emergency room. Later that afternoon, he again suffered cardiac arrest for 45 minutes at Kettering Medical Center and was pronounced dead after all efforts to resuscitate him failed. When his son arrived at the hospital to visit his supposed-to-be deceased father, he noticed a heartbeat on the monitor that was still attached to his father. Resuscitation efforts were resumed, and Yahle was successfully revived.
- Walter Williams, 78, from Lexington, Mississippi, United States, was at home when his hospice nurse called a coroner who arrived and declared him dead at 9:00 p.m. on 26 February 2014. Once at a funeral home, he was found to be moving, possibly resuscitated by a defibrillator implanted in his chest. The next day he was well enough to be talking with family, but died fifteen days later.
- Siti Masfufah Wardah, 12, from Probolinggo, Indonesia, was declared dead from chronic diabetes with organ complications. After being taken to her home, she was found with her eyes open by her parents who immediately called a medical professional. After her initial recovery she died one hour later.
- Timesha Beauchamp, 20, from Southfield, Michigan, United States, was declared dead by a doctor on August 23, 2020 after 30 minutes of resuscitation efforts by rescue professionals failed, and the doctor was informed via telephone. Beauchamp was not examined by the physician at the time, and did not have to be according to best practices. Hours later, after her body arrived at a Detroit funeral home, morticians realized Beauchamp was still alive. After it was announced that Beauchamp was alive, Southfield Fire Chief Johnny Menifee suggested in a news conference that Beauchamp's revival may be a case of Lazarus syndrome. She later died on October 18, 2020.
- Camila Roxana Martinez Mendoza, 3, of Villa de Ramos, Mexico, was declared dead by doctors on August 17, 2022, due to complications from a stomach infection, but at her funeral, family members noticed she was breathing and had a pulse. She was taken back to the same hospital that initially treated her for the infection and declared her dead, but she could not be saved.
- Velma Thomas, 59, of Nitro, West Virginia, United States, went into cardiac arrest at her home in May 2008. Medics were reportedly able to establish a faint pulse after eight minutes of CPR. Her heart stopped twice after arriving at the hospital and she was placed on life support. Doctors attempted to lower her body temperature to prevent additional brain injury. She was declared clinically dead for 17 hours after doctors failed to detect brain activity. Her son, Tim Thomas, stated that "her skin had already started hardening, her hands and toes were curling up, they were already drawn". She was taken off life support and funeral arrangements were in progress. However, ten minutes after being taken off life support, she revived and recovered.

== Implications ==
The Lazarus phenomenon raises ethical issues for physicians, who must determine when medical death has occurred, resuscitation efforts should end, and postmortem procedures such as autopsies and organ harvesting may take place.

Medical literature has recommended observation of a patient's vital signs for five to ten minutes after cessation of resuscitation before certifying death.

== See also ==
- Lazarus sign
- Lazarus taxon
- Near-death experience
- Premature burial
- Suspended animation
- Terminal lucidity
