= Brainstem death =

Clinical syndrome

Brainstem death is a clinical syndrome defined by the absence of reflexes mediated through the brainstem, which connects the spinal cord to the mid-brain, cerebellum and cerebral hemispheres in a deeply comatose, ventilator-dependent patient. Identification of this state carries a very grave prognosis for survival; cessation of heartbeat often occurs within a few days, although it may continue for weeks if intensive support is maintained.

In the United Kingdom, death can be certified on the basis of a formal diagnosis of brainstem death, provided that the diagnosis is made in accordance with the procedure established in "A Code of Practice for the Diagnosis and Confirmation of Death", published in 2008 by the Academy of Medical Royal Colleges. The premise of this is that a person is dead when consciousness and the ability to breathe are permanently lost, regardless of continuing life in the body and parts of the brain, and that death of the brain stem alone is sufficient to produce this state.

This concept of brainstem death is also accepted as grounds for pronouncing death for legal purposes in India and Trinidad & Tobago. Elsewhere in the world, the concept upon which the certification of death on neurological grounds is based is that of permanent cessation of all function in all parts of the brain – whole brain death – with which the British concept should not be confused. The United States' President's Council on Bioethics made it clear, for example, in its White Paper of December 2008, that the British concept and clinical criteria are not considered sufficient for the diagnosis of death in the United States.

== Evolution of diagnostic criteria ==
The United Kingdom (UK) criteria were first published by the Conference of Medical Royal Colleges (with advice from the Transplant Advisory Panel) in 1976, as prognostic guidelines. They were developed in response to a need for guidance in the management of deeply comatose patients with severe brain damage who were receiving mechanical ventilators but showed no signs of recovery. The Conference sought "to establish diagnostic criteria of such rigour that on their fulfilment the mechanical ventilator can be switched off, in the secure knowledge that there is no possible chance of recovery". The published criteria – negative responses to bedside tests of some reflexes with pathways through the brainstem and a specified challenge to the brainstem respiratory centre, with caveats about exclusion of endocrine influences, metabolic factors and drug effects – were held to be "sufficient to distinguish between those patients who retain the functional capacity to have a chance of even partial recovery and those where no such possibility exists". Recognition of that state required the withdrawal of artificial support allowing death to occur, thus "sparing relatives from the further emotional trauma of sterile hope".

In 1979, the Conference of Medical Royal Colleges promulgated its conclusion that identification of the state defined by those same criteria – then thought sufficient for a diagnosis of brain death – "means that the patient is dead". Death certification on those criteria has continued in the United Kingdom (where there is no statutory legal definition of death) since that time, particularly for organ transplantation purposes, although the conceptual basis for that use has changed.

In 1995, after a review by a Working Group of the Royal College of Physicians of London, the Conference of Medical Royal Colleges formally adopted the "more correct" term for the syndrome, "brainstem death" – championed by Pallis in a set of 1982 articles in the British Medical Journal – and advanced a new definition of human death as the basis for equating this syndrome with the death of the person. The suggested new definition of death was the "irreversible loss of the capacity for consciousness, combined with irreversible loss of the capacity to breathe". It was stated that the irreversible cessation of brainstem function will produce this state and "therefore brainstem death is equivalent to the death of the individual".

== Diagnosis ==
In the UK, the formal rules for the diagnosis of brainstem death have undergone only minor modifications since they were first published in 1976. The most recent revision of the UK's Department of Health Code of Practice governing use of that procedure for the diagnosis of death reaffirms the preconditions for its consideration. These are:

1. There should be no doubt that the patient's condition – deeply comatose, unresponsive and requiring artificial ventilation – is due to irreversible brain damage of known cause.
2. There should be no evidence that this state is due to depressant drugs.
3. Primary hypothermia as the cause of unconsciousness must have been excluded, and
4. Potentially reversible circulatory, metabolic and endocrine disturbances likewise.
5. Potentially reversible causes of apnoea (dependence on the ventilator), such as muscle relaxants and cervical cord injury, must be excluded.

With these pre-conditions satisfied, the definitive criteria are:

1. Fixed pupils which do not respond to sharp changes in the intensity of incident light.
2. No corneal reflex.
3. Absent oculovestibular reflexes – no eye movements following the slow injection of at least 50ml of ice-cold water into each ear in turn (the caloric reflex test).
4. No response to supraorbital pressure.
5. No cough reflex to bronchial stimulation or gagging response to pharyngeal stimulation.
6. No observed respiratory effort in response to disconnection of the ventilator for long enough (typically 5 minutes) to ensure elevation of the arterial partial pressure of carbon dioxide to at least 6.0 kPa (6.5 kPa in patients with chronic carbon dioxide retention). Adequate oxygenation is ensured by pre-oxygenation and diffusion oxygenation during the disconnection (so the brainstem respiratory centre is not challenged by the ultimate, anoxic, drive stimulus). This test – the apnoea test – is dangerous, and may prove lethal.

Two doctors, of specified status and experience, are required to act together to diagnose death on these criteria and the tests must be repeated after "a short period of time ... to allow return of the patient's arterial blood gases and baseline parameters to the pre-test state". These criteria for the diagnosis of death are not applicable to infants below the age of two months.

== Prognosis and management ==
Testing for the purpose of diagnosing death on brainstem death grounds may be delayed beyond the stage where brainstem reflexes may be absent only temporarily. In cases where cerebral blood flow is inadequate to support synaptic function despite sufficient blood flow to keep brain cells alive , patients may be capable of recovery. Thus prognosis must be made with due regard for the cause of the coma, and the rapidity of its onset. There has recently been renewed interest in the possibility of neuronal protection during this phase by use of moderate hypothermia and by correction of the neuroendocrine abnormalities commonly seen in this early stage.

Studies of patients meeting the criteria for brainstem death or whole brain death under American definitions record that even if ventilation is continued after diagnosis, the heart stops beating within only a few hours or days. However, there have been some very long-term survivals and it is noteworthy that expert management can maintain the bodily functions of pregnant brain dead women for long enough to bring them to term.

== Criticism ==
The diagnostic criteria were originally published for the purpose of identifying a clinical state associated with a fatal prognosis (see above). The change of use, in the UK, to criteria for the diagnosis of death itself was protested immediately. The initial basis for the change of use was the claim that satisfaction of the criteria sufficed for the diagnosis of the death of the brain as a whole, despite the persistence of demonstrable activity in parts of the brain. In 1995, that claim was abandoned and the diagnosis of death (acceptable for legal purposes in the UK in the context of organ procurement for transplantation) by the specified testing of brainstem functions was based on a new definition of death – the permanent loss of the capacity for consciousness and spontaneous breathing. There are doubts that this concept is generally understood and accepted and that the specified testing is stringent enough to determine that state. It is, however, associated with substantial risk of exacerbating the brain damage and even causing the death of the apparently dying patient so tested (see "the apnoea test" above). This raises ethical problems which seem not to have been addressed.

It has been argued that sound scientific support is lacking for the claim that the specified purely bedside tests have the power to diagnose true and total death of the brainstem, the necessary condition for the assumption of permanent loss of the intrinsically untestable consciousness-arousal function of those elements of the reticular formation which lie within the brainstem (there are elements also within the wider brain). Knowledge of this arousal system is based upon the findings from animal experiments as shown by pathological studies in humans. The current neurological consensus is that the arousal of consciousness depends upon reticular components which reside in the midbrain, diencephalon and pons. It is said that the midbrain reticular formation may be viewed as a driving centre for the higher structures, loss of which produces a state in which the cortex appears, on the basis of electroencephalographic (EEG) studies, to be awaiting the command or ability to function. The role of diencephalic (higher brain) involvement is stated to be uncertain and we are reminded that the arousal system is best regarded as a physiological rather than a precise anatomical entity. There should, perhaps, also be a caveat about possible arousal mechanisms involving the first and second cranial nerves (serving sight and smell) which are not tested when diagnosing brainstem death but which were described in cats in 1935 and 1938. In humans, light flashes have been observed to disturb the sleep-like EEG activity persisting after the loss of all brainstem reflexes and of spontaneous respiration.

There is also concern about the permanence of consciousness loss, based on studies in cats, dogs and monkeys which recovered consciousness days or weeks after being rendered comatose by brainstem ablation and on human studies of brainstem stroke syndrome raising thoughts about the "plasticity" of the nervous system. Other theories of consciousness place more stress on the thalamocortical system. Perhaps the most objective statement to be made is that consciousness is not currently understood. That being so, proper caution must be exercised in accepting a diagnosis of its permanent loss before all cerebral blood flow has permanently ceased.

The ability to breathe spontaneously depends upon functioning elements in the medulla – the 'respiratory centre'. In the UK, establishing a neurological diagnosis of death involves challenging this centre with the strong stimulus offered by an unusually high concentration of carbon dioxide in the arterial blood, but it is not challenged by the more powerful drive stimulus provided by anoxia – although the effect of that ultimate stimulus is sometimes seen after final disconnection of the ventilator in the form of agonal gasps.

No testing of testable brain stem functions such as oesophageal and cardiovascular regulation is specified in the UK Code of Practice for the diagnosis of death on neurological grounds. There is published evidence strongly suggestive of the persistence of brainstem blood pressure control in organ donors.

A small minority of medical practitioners working in the UK have argued that neither requirement of the UK Health Department's Code of Practice basis for the equation of brainstem death with death is satisfied by its current diagnostic protocol and that in terms of its ability to diagnose de facto brainstem death it falls far short.
