= Brain death =

Permanent loss of brain function

- Other names: Brain stem death, neurological death, coma dépassé, grade IV coma, irreversible coma, biological death, death
- A brain-dead patient due to stray bullet injury. The patient can also be seen here executing the Lazarus sign. After the recording, his organs were donated.
- Specialty: Neurology, neurosurgery, palliative care, critical care medicine
- Complications: Total organ failure
- Causes: Cardiac arrest, myocardial infarction, stroke, blood clot, hypoxia, traumatic brain injury, circulatory shock, neurodegenerative disease
- Diagnostic method: Stimulation testing, EEG, pupil reactivity test
- Differential diagnosis: Coma, persistent vegetative state, hypothermia, hypoglycemia, sedation, chemical paralysis
- Treatment: Artificial life support, Final disposition, Organ donation
- Prognosis: Death
- Frequency: Universal
- Deaths: 56 million

Brain death is the permanent, irreversible, and complete loss of brain function, which may include cessation of involuntary activity (e.g., breathing) necessary to sustain life. It differs from persistent vegetative state, in which the person is alive and some autonomic functions remain. It is also distinct from comas as long as some brain and bodily activity and function remain, and it is also not the same as the condition locked-in syndrome. A differential diagnosis can medically distinguish these differing conditions. In humans, brain death is physiologically irreversible, and therefore establishing brain death is the most certain metric by which humans can be considered to have died.

Brain death is used as an indicator of legal death in many jurisdictions, but it is defined inconsistently and often confused by the public. Various parts of the brain may keep functioning when others do not anymore, bringing questions about whether they should truly be considered dead. The term "brain death" has been used to refer to various combinations. For example, although one major medical dictionary considers "brain death" to be synonymous with "cerebral death" (death of the cerebrum), the US National Library of Medicine Medical Subject Headings (MeSH) system defines brain death as including the brainstem. The distinctions are medically significant because, for example, in someone with a dead cerebrum but a living brainstem, spontaneous breathing may continue unaided, whereas in whole-brain death (which includes brainstem death), only life support equipment would maintain ventilation. In certain countries, patients classified as brain-dead may legally have their organs surgically removed for organ donation.

== Medicolegal history ==
Brain death is a medicolegal death of a person due to the complete and irreversible loss of all brain functions, including the brain stem. The definition of brain death is accepted in numerous regions, yet it is one of the most complicated topics in medical ethics today. In operational definitions of death have obvious medicolegal implications (in medical jurisprudence and medical law). Traditionally, both the legal and medical communities determined death through the permanent end of certain bodily functions in clinical death, especially respiration and heartbeat. With the increasing ability of the medical community to resuscitate people with no respiration, heartbeat, or other external signs of life, the need for another definition of death occurred, raising questions of legal death. This gained greater urgency with the widespread use of life support equipment and the rising capabilities and demand for organ transplantation.

Since the 1960s, laws governing the determination of death have been implemented in all countries that have active organ transplantation programs. The first European country to adopt brain death as a legal definition (or indicator) of death was Finland in 1971, while in the United States, the state of Kansas had enacted a similar law earlier.

An ad hoc committee at Harvard Medical School published a pivotal 1968 report to define irreversible coma. The Harvard criteria gradually gained consensus toward what is now known as brain death. In the wake of the 1976 Karen Ann Quinlan case, state legislatures in the United States moved to accept brain death as an acceptable indication of death. In 1981, a presidential commission issued a landmark report entitled Defining Death: Medical, Legal, and Ethical Issues in the Determination of Death, which rejected the "higher-brain" approach to death in favor of a "whole-brain" definition. This report formed the basis for the Uniform Determination of Death Act, since enacted in 39 states. Today, both the legal and medical communities in the US use "brain death" as a legal definition of death, allowing a person to be declared legally dead even if life support equipment maintains the body's metabolic processes.

In the UK, the Royal College of Physicians reported in 1995, abandoning the 1979 claim that the tests published in 1976 sufficed for the diagnosis of brain death, and suggesting a new definition of death based on the irreversible loss of brain-stem function alone. This new definition, the irreversible loss of the capacity for consciousness and for spontaneous breathing, and the essentially unchanged 1976 tests held to establish that state, have been adopted as a basis of death certification for organ transplant purposes in subsequent Codes of Practice. The Australia and New Zealand Intensive Care Society (ANZICS) states that the "determination of brain death requires that there is unresponsive coma, the absence of brain-stem reflexes and the absence of respiratory centre function, in the clinical setting in which these findings are irreversible. In particular, there must be definite clinical or neuro-imaging evidence of acute brain pathology (e.g. traumatic brain injury, intracranial haemorrhage, hypoxic encephalopathy) consistent with the irreversible loss of neurological function." In Brazil, the Federal Council of Medicine revised its regulations in 2017, including "a requirement for the patient to meet specific physiological prerequisites and for the physician to provide optimized care to the patient before starting the procedures for diagnosing brain death and to perform complementary tests, as well as the need for specific training for physicians who make this diagnosis."

In 2020, an international panel of experts, the World Brain Death Project, published a guideline that:

provides recommendations for the minimum clinical standards for determination of brain death/death by neurologic criteria (BD/DNC) in adults and children with clear guidance for various clinical circumstances. The recommendations have widespread international society endorsement and can serve to guide professional societies and countries in the revision or development of protocols and procedures for determination of brain death/death by neurologic criteria, leading to greater consistency within and between countries (Greer et al., 2020).

The World Brain Death Project, published in 2020 by Greer et al., provides some of the most comprehensive and globally recognized recommendations for determining brain death. The agreement statement offers detailed evidence in protocols for diagnosing brain death in adults and children. It focuses on a standard clinical process, additional testing when necessary, and special considerations in difficult cases. One of the project's main goals is to reduce differences in brain death diagnosis by creating a consistent, international framework.

== Medical criteria ==
Natural movements also known as the Lazarus sign or Lazarus reflex can occur on a brain-dead person whose organs have been kept functioning by life support. The living cells that can cause these movements are not living cells from the brain or brain stem; these cells come from the spinal cord. Sometimes these body movements can cause false hope for family members.

A brain-dead individual has no clinical evidence of brain function upon physical examination. This includes no response to pain and no cranial nerve reflexes. Reflexes include pupillary response (fixed pupils), oculocephalic reflex, corneal reflex, no response to the caloric reflex test, and no spontaneous respirations.

Brain death can sometimes be difficult to differentiate from other medical states such as barbiturate overdose, acute alcohol poisoning, sedative overdose, hypothermia, hypoglycemia, coma, and chronic vegetative states. Some comatose patients can recover to pre-coma or near pre-coma level of functioning, and some patients with severe irreversible neurological dysfunction will nonetheless retain some lower brain functions, such as spontaneous respiration, despite the losses of both cortex and brain stem functionality. Such is the case with anencephaly.

Brain electrical activity can stop completely, or drop to such a low level as to be undetectable with most equipment. An EEG will therefore be flat, though this is sometimes also observed during deep anesthesia or cardiac arrest. Although in the United States a flat EEG test is not required to certify death, it is considered to have confirmatory value. In the UK it is not considered to be of value because any continuing activity it might reveal in parts of the brain above the brain stem is held to be irrelevant to the diagnosis of death on the Code of Practice criteria.

The diagnosis of brain death is often required to be highly rigorous, in order to be certain that the condition is irreversible. Legal criteria vary, but in general require neurological examinations by two independent physicians. The tests for brain death must show complete and irreversible absence of brain function (brain stem function in UK), and may include two isoelectric (flat-line) EEGs 24 hours apart (less in other countries where it is accepted that if the cause of the dysfunction is a clear physical trauma there is no need to wait that long to establish irreversibility). The patient should have a normal temperature and be free of drugs that can suppress brain activity if the diagnosis is to be made on EEG criteria.

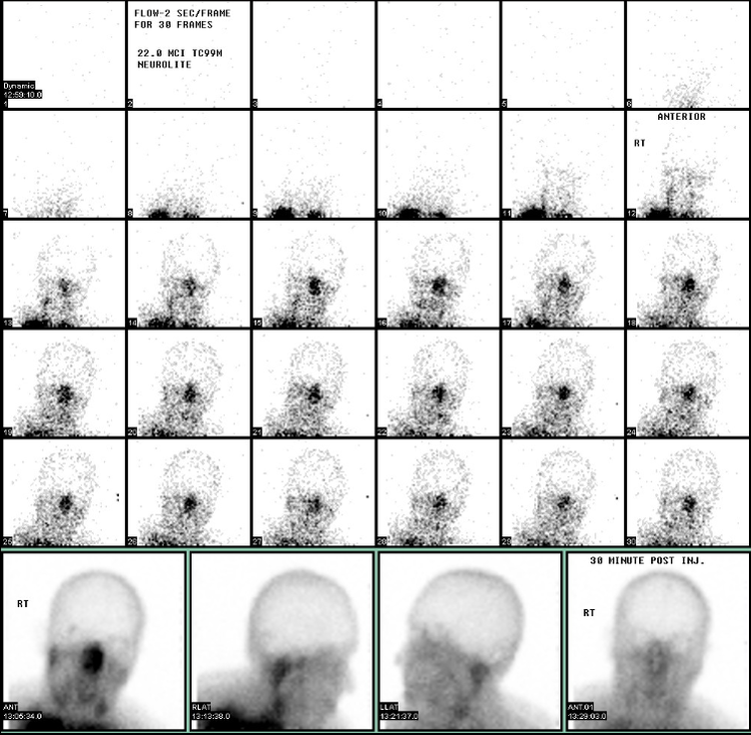
Radionuclide scan: No intracranial blood flow. The "hot-nose" sign is shown.

Also, a radionuclide cerebral blood flow scan that shows complete absence of intracranial blood flow must be considered with other exams – temporary swelling of the brain, particularly within the first 72 hours, can lead to a false positive test on a patient that may recover with more time.

CT angiography is neither required nor sufficient test to make the diagnosis.

Confirmatory testing is only needed under the age of 1. For children and adults, testing is optional. Other situations possibly requiring confirmatory testing include severe facial trauma where determination of brainstem reflexes will be difficult, pre-existing pupillary abnormalities, and patients with severe sleep apnea and/or pulmonary disease. Confirmatory tests include: cerebral angiography, electroencephalography, transcranial Doppler ultrasonography, and cerebral scintigraphy (technetium Tc 99m exametazime). Cerebral angiography is considered the most sensitive confirmatory test in the determination of brain death.

== Organ donation ==
While the diagnosis of brain death has become accepted as a basis for the certification of death for legal purposes, it is a very different state from biological death – the state universally recognized and understood as death. The continuing function of vital organs in the bodies of those diagnosed brain-dead, if mechanical ventilation and other life-support measures are continued, provides optimal opportunities for their transplantation.

When mechanical ventilation is used to support the body of a brain-dead organ donor pending a transplant into an organ recipient, the donor's date of death is listed as the date that brain death was diagnosed.

In some countries (for instance, Spain, Finland, the United Kingdom, Portugal, France, and Switzerland), everyone is automatically an organ donor after diagnosis of death on legally accepted criteria, although some jurisdictions (such as Singapore, Spain, the United Kingdom, France, Czech Republic, Poland and Portugal) allow opting out of the system. Elsewhere, consent from family members or next-of-kin may be required for organ donation. In New Zealand, Australia and most states in the United States, drivers are asked upon application if they wish to be registered as an organ donor.

In the United States, if the patient is at or near death, the hospital must notify a designated Organ Procurement Organization (OPO) of the details, and maintain the patient while the patient is being evaluated for suitability as a donor. The OPO searches to see if the deceased is registered as a donor, which serves as legal consent; if the deceased has not registered or otherwise noted consent (e.g., on a driver's license), the OPO will ask the next of kin for authorization. The patient is kept on ventilator support until the organs have been surgically removed. If the patient has indicated in an advance health care directive that they do not wish to receive mechanical ventilation or has specified a do-not-resuscitate (DNR) order and the patient has also indicated that they wish to donate their organs, some vital organs such as the heart and lungs may not be able to be recovered.

== Demographics ==
=== United States ===
Brain death is responsible for 2% of all adult and 5% of pediatric in-hospital deaths in the United States. In a nationwide survey of pediatric intensive care units (PICU) in the United States in 2019; there were more than 3,000 pediatric brain deaths out of a total of more than 15,344 children who died in PICUs. According to a national study, "brain death evaluations are performed infrequently, even in large PICUs."

== See also ==
- Brainstem death
- Clinical death
- Consciousness after death
- Death
- Persistent vegetative state
- Information-theoretic death
- Klaus Schäfer
