= Hot nose sign =

Radiologic sign

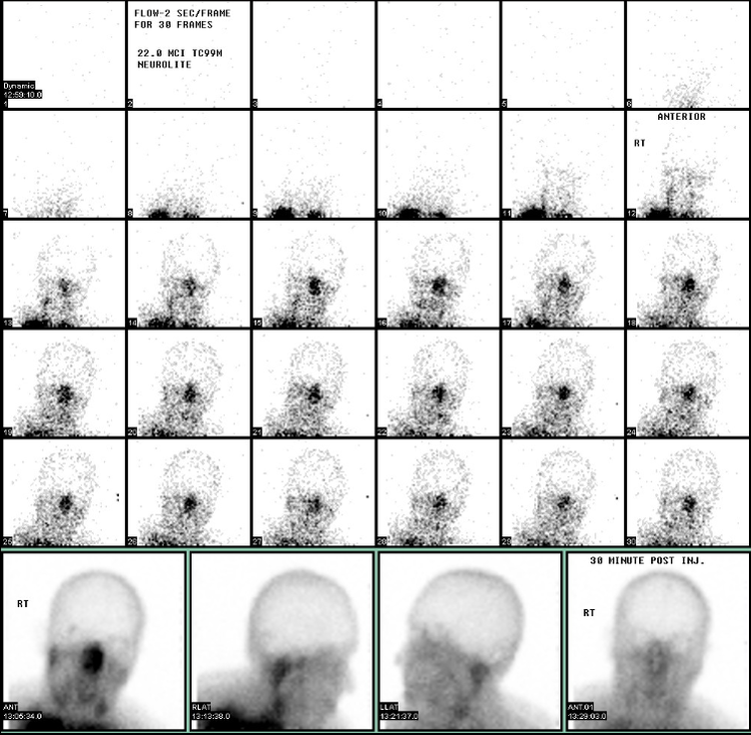
Radionuclide scan showing no intracranial blood flow. The hot nose sign is manifest.

The hot nose sign refers to increased perfusion in the nasal region on nuclear medicine cerebral perfusion studies in the setting of brain death. The absent or reduced flow in the internal carotid arteries is thought to lead to increased flow within the external carotid arteries and subsequent increased perfusion in the nasal region. Normally little or no tracer is seen in the nasopharyngeal region, or it appears only in the venous phase, so early and increased activity is the abnormal finding.

The appearance was first described in 1970 by Fred Mishkin and Mark Dyken, who reported marked nasal activity on radionuclide angiograms in patients with anatomical or functional occlusion of one or both internal carotid arteries and a patent external carotid artery. In brain death the occlusion is functional, caused by intracranial pressure rising above cerebral perfusion pressure, and the sign has been reported in about 52% of cases. It is not limited to brain death and may also be seen with mechanical carotid occlusion or with functional occlusion from raised intracranial pressure in cerebrovascular accident, transient ischemic attack, subdural hematoma and hepatic encephalopathy.

The clinical usefulness of the sign has been questioned, as it lacks sensitivity and specificity, and radionuclide studies are only rarely used to confirm brain death. One study using anterior and lateral views suggested that the diverted blood flow is directed mainly to the brainstem and only to a lesser extent to the nasopharynx, rather than truly representing increased flow to the nose.
