= Warts and All: Volume 2 =

Live album by Moe
- Released: September 10, 2002
- Recorded: February 23, 2002
- Genre: Rock
- Length: 209:47
- Label: Fatboy Records
- Producer: Moe

Moe chronology
Warts and All: Volume 1 (2001)	Warts and All: Volume 2 (2002)	Season's Greetings from moe. (2002)

Professional ratings
Review scores
Source	Rating
AllMusic	3/5 stars

Warts and All: Volume 2 is the second volume in a collection of commercially released, full-concert live albums by the American jam band Moe. It was recorded live on February 23, 2002 at the Tabernacle in Atlanta, Georgia. This set features the first released version of "Kids", predating its release on Wormwood by five months.

This album is one of 10 "live jam releases of this century" according to the August issue of Guitar One magazine.

== Track listing ==
All tracks by Moe except where noted.

=== Disc one ===
1. "Intro"* - 1:04
2. "Okayalright" - 5:04
3. "She Sends Me" - 4:54
4. "Spaz Medicine" - 9:58
5. "Understand" - 7:08
6. "Letter Home" - 5:34
7. "Timmy Tucker -> Kids jam ->" - 28:19

=== Disc two ===
1. "Kids" - 23:32
2. "Mexico ->" - 22:38
3. "Happy Hour Hero ->" - 14:38
4. "Seat of My Pants ->" - 12:03
5. "Sensory Deprivation Bank" - 6:06

=== Disc three ===
1. "Four ->" - 13:41
2. "Rebubula" - 20:28
  Encore
3. "Bantor"* - 2:05
4. "Fire" (Jimi Hendrix) - 2:05
  "Spine of a Dog" -> "Buster"** - 28:12
- * "Intro" and "Bantor" are not songs, but names given to the opening/talking sections.
- ** hidden track from 2/22/02 at The Tabernacle, Atlanta, GA

== Personnel ==
=== Moe ===
- Vinnie Amico – drums
- Rob Derhak – bass, vocals
- Chuck Garvey – guitar, vocals, artwork
- Jim Loughlin – guitar (acoustic), percussion, piccolo bass
- Al Schnier – guitar, mandolin, vocals, moog synthesizer

=== Technical ===
- Chris Burrows – production coordination, stage manager
- Becca Childs Derhak – art direction, photography
- Fred Kevorkian – mastering
- Steve Young – mixing
