= Warts and All: Volume 5 =

Live album by moe.
- Released: June 12, 2007
- Recorded: February 22, 2005
- Genre: Rock
- Label: Fatboy Records
- Producer: moe.

Moe. chronology
The Conch (2007)	Warts and All: Volume 5 (2007)	Sticks and Stones (2008)

Warts and All: Volume 5 is a live album recorded on February 22, 2005 at the Val Air Ballroom in Des Moines, Iowa. It is the fifth set in a collection of commercially released full-concert live albums by the American jam band moe. Unlike most of the Warts and All releases, it does not contain any filler track(s). It was released on June 12, 2007.

This set features the first released versions of "George" and "Tijuana Donkey Show".

== Track listing ==
All tracks recorded live on February 22, 2005 at the Val Air Ballroom in Des Moines, IA.

=== Disc one ===
1. "intro" — 0:56
2. "Bring You Down ->" (Schnier) — 12:45
3. "Shoot First" (Garvey, moe.) — 7:42
4. "Captain America ->" (Derhak) — 9:19
5. "She" (Schnier) — 14:48
6. "Y.O.Y. ->" (Garvey) — 7:59
7. "George" (Schnier) — 15:33

=== Disc two ===
1. "intro" — 1:24
2. "Spine of a Dog ->" (Garvey) — 6:29
3. "Mexico ->" (Schnier) — 21:51
4. "Plane Crash ->" (Derhak) — 18:08
5. "Spine of a Dog ->" (Garvey) — 4:37
6. "Yodelittle" (Schnier) — 1:29

=== Disc three ===
1. "Yodelittle ->" (Schnier) — 27:48
2. "Spine of a Dog ->" (Garvey) — 6:42
3. "Buster" (Derhak) — 13:09
4. "Tijuana Donkey Show"* (Derhak) — 6:08
5. "New York City"* (Derhak) — 5:11
- "Tijuana Donkey Show" and "New York City" were the encore songs.

== Personnel ==
moe.:

- Chuck Garvey — vocals, guitar, cover art
- Rob Derhak — vocals, bass guitar
- Vinnie Amico — drums
- Al Schnier — guitar, vocals, keyboards, Moog synthesizer
- Jim Loughlin — percussion, acoustic guitar

Production:

- Becca Childs Derhak — art direction
- Fred Kevorkian — mastering

== Charts ==
Album - Billboard

Year	Chart	Position
2007	Top Heatseekers	44
