= Warts and All: Volume 1 =

Live album by Moe
- Released: November 6, 2001
- Recorded: February 28, 2001
- Genre: Rock, jam
- Length: 184:57
- Label: Fatboy Records
- Producer: Moe

Moe chronology
Dither (2001)	Warts and All: Volume 1 (2001)	Warts and All: Volume 2 (2002)

Professional ratings
Review scores
Source	Rating
AllMusic	3/5 stars

Warts and All: Volume 1 is the first volume in a collection of commercially released, full-concert live albums by the American jam band Moe. It was recorded live on February 28, 2001 at the Scranton Cultural Center in Scranton, Pennsylvania.

This set features the first released version of the live favorite, "Waiting For The Punchline", as well as "Crab Eyes" and "Kyle's Song", which predate their release on Wormwood by over a year.

== Track listing ==
All tracks by Moe except where noted.

=== Disc one ===
1. "Intro" – 1:09
2. "Head" – 15:47
3. "The Ghost of Ralph's Mom" (also known as TGORM) – 4:36
4. "Nebraska" – 4:55
5. "Crab Eyes" – 10:22

=== Disc two ===
1. "Moth" -> – 17:33
2. "Timmy Tucker" – 30:39
3. "Intro" – 0:53
4. "Happy Hour Hero" -> – 15:13
5. "Seat of My Pants" – 9:48

=== Disc three ===
1. "Tambourine" – 8:37
2. "Waiting for the Punchline" – 16:40
3. "Kyle's Song" -> – 13:43
4. "Meat" -> – 29:18
5. "Moth" (reprise) – 1:46
6. "Encore Intro" – 0:56
7. "I Wanna Be Sedated" (Ramones cover) – 3:14

== Personnel ==
=== Moe ===
- Vinnie Amico – drums
- Rob Derhak – bass, vocals
- Chuck Garvey – guitar, vocals, illustrations
- Jim Loughlin – percussion
- Al Schnier – guitar, vocals

=== Technical ===
- Becca Childs Derhak – art direction, photography
- Fred Kevorkian – mastering
- Steve Young – mixing
