= Warts and All: Volume 4 =

Live album by moe.
- Released: March 8, 2005
- Recorded: July 18, 1998
- Genre: Rock
- Length: 229:28
- Label: Fatboy
- Producer: moe.

Moe. chronology
Warts and All: Volume 3 (2003)	Warts and All: Volume 4 (2005)	The Conch (2007)

Professional ratings
Review scores
Source	Rating
Allmusic	3/5 stars

Warts and All: Volume 4 is a live album recorded on July 18, 1998, at the Copper Dragon in Carbondale, Illinois. It is the fourth set in a collection of commercially released full-concert live albums by the American jam band moe.

This set features the first released versions of "Backwoods" and "Bearsong".

== Track listing ==
=== Disc one ===
All tracks recorded live on July 18, 1998, at the Copper Dragon in Carbondale, Illinois, with the exception of "Brent Black".

1. "tuning" — 1:23
2. "Threw It All Away" (Schnier) — 4:56
3. "St. Augustine" (Derhak) — 11:07
4. "Waiting for the Punchline" (Schnier) — 13:39
5. "Happy Hour Hero" (Derhak) — 11:25
6. "Backwoods" — 4:40
7. "Y.O.Y." -> (Garvey) — 12:22
8. "Recreational Chemistry" (Schnier) — 16:52

=== Disc two ===
1. "The Harder They Come" (Cliff) — 7:30
2. "tuning" — 0:40
3. "Dr. Graffenburg" -> (Derhak) — 22:37
4. "Havah Negliah" -> (traditional) — 5:07
5. "Time Ed" (Derhak) — 16:08
6. "Water" (Derhak) — 7:30
7. "Brent Black -> Low Rider -> Brent Black"* — 15:16
- "Brent Black" recorded 11/15/1997 in Knoxville, TN.

=== Disc three ===
1. "Yodelittle" -> (Schnier) — 22:58
2. "Rebubula" -> (Derhak) — 28:51
3. "I Know You Rider" (traditional) — 12:36
4. "banter" — 1:26
5. "Bearsong" (Schnier) — 9:04

== Personnel ==
=== moe. ===
- Vinnie Amico – drums
- Rob Derhak – bass, vocals
- Chuck Garvey – guitar, vocals, illustrations
- Al Schnier – guitar, vocals

=== Additional personnel ===
- Steve Young – mixing
- Fred Kevorkian – mastering
- Becca Childs Derhak – art direction, photography
