= Warts and All: Volume 6 =

Live album by moe.
- Released: 2008
- Recorded: January 28, 2007
- Genre: Rock
- Label: Fatboy Records
- Producer: moe.

Moe. chronology
Sticks and Stones (2008)	Warts and All: Volume 6 (2008)	Dr. Stan's Prescription, Volume 1 (2008)

Warts and All: Volume 6 is a live album recorded on January 28, 2007 at Liberty Hall in Lawrence, Kansas. It is the sixth set in a collection of commercially released full-concert live albums by the American jam band moe. The cover art is an homage to The Best of Kansas.

This set features the first released versions of "Bring It Back Home" and "Jazz Wank".

== Track listing ==
All tracks recorded live on January 28, 2007 at Liberty Hall in Lawrence, Kansas.

=== Disc one ===
1. "intro"
2. "Captain America"
3. "It"
4. "Bring It Back Home>"
5. "Lost Along the Way"
6. "Jazz Wank ->"

=== Disc two ===
1. "Rebubula"
2. "Spine of a Dog"
3. "Dr. Graffenburg"

=== Disc three ===
1. "Four"
2. "Head ->"
3. "Brent Black"
4. "Gone"*
5. "The Ghost of Ralph's Mom"*
- "Gone" and "TGORM" were the evening's encore songs.
