= Sticks and Stones (Moe album) =

Studio album by Moe
- Released: January 22, 2008
- Recorded: Fall 2007
- Genre: Rock
- Label: Fatboy Records
- Producer: Moe

Moe chronology
Warts and All: Volume 5 (2007)	Sticks and Stones (2008)	Warts and All: Volume 6 (2008)

Sticks and Stones is the ninth studio album by the American rock band, Moe. It was released on January 22, 2008, by Fatboy Records, almost one year to the day after the release of their last studio album, The Conch. It was the first Moe album to also be released on vinyl.

== History ==
In the fall of 2007, Moe rented an old church/cathedral in the New England area where they could record new material at their leisure. This is a departure for the band since on their last two previous studio albums, The Conch (2007) and Wormwood (2003), the band had performed their new songs for a live audience extensively and even used audio recordings from the shows to mix with the studio recordings. The seven songs not previously displayed for the album were "wrote and recorded ... in about three weeks" according to guitarist Al Schnier.

Allaire Studios provided final mixing while the mastering was done by Bob Ludwig. Guest appearances by Allie Kral, Umphrey's McGee, Swampadelica's Nadine LaFond and others were included on Sticks and Stones.

== Reception ==
Professional ratings
Review scores
Source	Rating
AllMusic	3.5/5 stars
Rolling Stone	3.5/5 stars

The album received mostly positive reviews. Rolling Stone, Allmusic, and Glide magazine all rated the album 3.5 stars out of 5. The album also received a very positive review at Jambase, which states that "...the result is moe.'s most concise and well-written album to date," and, "The ten tunes on Sticks And Stones are short and to the point, with the focus on moe's skill as songwriters rather than their collective and considerable musical prowess"

Based on 16 customer reviews at Amazon.com, 10 people gave it 4 stars or better. Most common criticisms of the album included the lack of extended solos, and that the songs could have used some better development by testing them out on the road more (only "Conviction Song" and "All Roads Lead to Home" had been previously performed live).

Overall, the album fared about the same as their previous studio album, The Conch, on the Billboard Music charts.

== Track listing ==
1. Cathedral – 3:56
2. Sticks and Stones – 3:36
3. Darkness – 2:50
4. Conviction Song – 5:04
5. Z0Z (Zed Nought Zee)* – 4:38
6. Deep This Time – 4:15
7. All Roads Lead to Home – 3:16
8. September – 3:48
9. Queen of Everything – 6:13
10. Raise a Glass – 2:59

== Personnel ==
- Chuck Garvey – lead vocals, guitar
- Rob Derhak – lead vocals, bass guitar
- Vinnie Amico – drums, percussion, vocals
- Al Schnier – lead vocals, guitar, keyboards, mandolin, accordion
- Jim Loughlin – percussion, marimba, vibraphone, vocals

== Credits ==
- John Siket – producer

== Chart performance ==
=== Album ===
Chart	Provider(s)	Peak position	Certification	Sales/ shipments
Billboard 200 (U.S.)	Billboard	119	Not certified	N/A
Billboard Top Independent Albums (U.S.)	Billboard	16	Not certified	N/A
Billboard Heatseekers (U.S.)	Billboard	2	Not certified	N/A
