= Dr. Stan's Prescription, Volume 1 =

Live album by moe.
- Released: September 2, 2008
- Recorded: March 8, 2004; March 17, 1995
- Genre: Rock
- Label: Fatboy Records
- Producer: moe.

Moe. chronology
Warts and All: Volume 6 (2008)	Dr. Stan's Prescription, Volume 1 (2008)	Dr. Stan's Prescription, Volume 2 (2009)

Dr. Stan's Prescription, Volume 1 is a live album by the American rock band moe. It contains the complete concert recorded on board their Caribbean cruise on March 8, 2004, with bonus tracks recorded in Vail, Colorado on March 17, 1995.

This set features the first released versions of "Armageddon Jig" and "Farmer Ben".

== Critical reception ==
Professional ratings
Review scores
Source	Rating
Allmusic	3/5 stars

On AllMusic, Patrick Leahey said, "The band sounds loose and comfortable during the [2004] cruise ship segment, a mood no doubt indebted for the sunshine and tropical vibes that permeated the pool deck... Rounding out the latter halves of discs two and three is the 1995 performance... Fans of the band will be interested in hearing the "then and now" switcheroo that this collection presents."

== Track listing ==
Disc one
March 8, 2004 first set:

1. Intro – 1:25
2. "Bring It Back Home" (Vinnie Amico, Jim Loughlin, Al Schnier, Rob Derhak, Chuck Garvey) – 6:56
3. "New York City" (Schnier, Derhak, Garvey) – 7:05
4. "Hi & Lo" (Schnier, Derhak, Garvey) – 9:48
5. "Bring You Down" (Schnier, Derhak, Garvey) – 10:48
6. "Kyle's Song" (Schnier, Derhak, Garvey) – 10:24
7. "Interstellar Overdrive" (Syd Barrett, Nick Mason, Roger Waters, Richard Wright) – 9:34
8. "Brent Black" (Schnier, Derhak, Garvey) – 18:54

Disc two
March 8, 2004 second set:

1. Intro – 4:41
2. "Recreational Chemistry" (Schnier, Derhak, Garvey) – 13:06
3. "Turn On Your Lovelight" (Deadric Malone, Joseph Scott) – 6:19
4. "Recreational Chemistry" (Schnier, Derhak, Garvey) – 3:50
5. "Lost Pirate Jam" (Amico, Loughlin, Schnier, Derhak, Garvey) – 9:57
6. "Captain America" (Schnier, Derhak, Garvey) – 8:27
7. "Lost Along the Way" (Schnier, Derhak, Garvey) – 11:18

March 17, 1995 bonus tracks:

8. "St. Augustine" (Schnier, Derhak, Garvey) – 3:46
9. "Mexico" (Schnier, Derhak, Garvey) – 7:54
10. "Armageddon Jig" (Loughlin, Schnier, Derhak, Garvey) – 2:15
11. "Farmer Ben" (Loughlin, Schnier, Derhak, Garvey) – 6:38

Disc three
March 8, 2004 second set, continued:

1. "Spine of a Dog" (Schnier, Derhak, Garvey) – 8:10
2. "Jazz Wank" (Schnier, Derhak, Garvey) – 11:36
3. "Buster" (Schnier, Derhak, Garvey) – 15:54

March 8, 2004 encore:

4. "The Weight" (Robbie Robertson) – 6:06

March 17, 1995 bonus tracks:

5. "Dr. Graffenberg" (Schnier, Derhak, Garvey) – 6:52
6. "Havah Negilah" (traditional) – 1:47
7. "Moth" (Schnier, Derhak, Garvey) – 6:06
8. "Timmy Tucker" (Schnier, Derhak, Garvey) – 9:32
9. "Seat of My Pants" (Schnier, Derhak, Garvey) – 7:47
10. "Brent Black" (Schnier, Derhak, Garvey) – 5:49

== Personnel ==
moe.

- Vinnie Amico – drums (except bonus tracks)
- Rob Derhak – bass, vocals
- Chuck Garvey – guitar, vocals
- Jim Loughlin – percussion, piccolo bass, acoustic guitar, Mallet Kat; drums (on bonus tracks)
- Al Schnier – guitar, keyboards, vocals

Production

- Produced by moe.
- Archived by Dr. Stan Lobitz
- Mixing: Steve Young
- Filler recording and mixing: Brendan O'Neil
- Mastering: Fred Kevorkian
- Art direction: Becca Childs Derhak
