= Warts and All =

Series of albums by Moe

Warts and All is an album series of live recorded shows by the American jam band Moe.

As of mid-2007, there are six volumes.

The fourth volume was recorded in 1998 at the Copper Dragon in Carbondale, Illinois.

== Warts and All series ==
- Volume 1: Recorded live on February 28, 2001, at the Scranton Cultural Center in Scranton, Pennsylvania.
- Volume 2: Recorded live on February 23, 2002, at the Tabernacle in Atlanta, Georgia.
- Volume 3: Recorded live on November 13, 1998, at the Vic Theater in Chicago, Illinois.
- Volume 4: Recorded live on July 18, 1998, at the Copper Dragon in Carbondale, Illinois.
- Volume 5: Recorded live on February 22, 2005, at the Val Air Ballroom in Des Moines, Iowa.
- Volume 6: Recorded live on January 28, 2007, at Liberty Hall in Lawrence, Kansas.
