= Moe.: Live at the Fillmore =

- DVD cover
- Written by: moe.
- Directed by: Hank Lena
- Starring: moe.
- Music by: moe.
- Original language: English

Production
- Producer: Evan Haiman
- Running time: 100 mins

Original release
- Release: October 3, 2006

moe.: Live at the Fillmore is the first live concert DVD released by moe., an American rock band. It was recorded on April 2, 2005 at the Fillmore Denver in Denver, Colorado and released to the public on October 3, 2006.

== History ==
During three shows in the first half of 2005, the band professionally filmed their performances. The first show was at the Fillmore Denver on April 2. Even though the band is taper friendly, it prohibited fans from taping this show, since the band's performance was originally contracted to broadcast on HDnet as part of their music series. The recorded show was broadcast in 5.1 audio and High Definition video on HDNet as part of their Sunday Night Concert Series on July 23, 2006 (with repeats the following week).

The band also filmed two special shows in Portland, Maine and recorded the audio for possible inclusion on the new album, The Conch. For this reason, the band did not allow audio taping by the fans for these shows either. The Portland shows from June 10, 2005 and June 11, 2005 were originally going to be part of the band's first DVD release, but that idea was scrapped and the show at the Fillmore was the one selected.

== Track listing ==
1. "Crab Eyes" (Derhak, Schnier, Garvey)
2. "Lost Along the Way" (Schnier)
3. "Moth" (Schnier)
4. "Wind It Up" (Garvey)
5. "Timmy Tucker" (Derhak, Garvey)
6. "Tailspin" (Schnier)
7. "Big World" (Schnier)
8. "Brittle End" (Derhak)
9. "Rebubula" (Derhak)

Bonus tracks:

- "McBain" (moe.)
- "Kyle's Song" (Derhak, Schnier)

Bonus material:

- Band commentary
- Band interviews

== Personnel ==
moe.:

- Chuck Garvey - vocals, guitar
- Rob Derhak - vocals, bass guitar
- Vinnie Amico - drums
- Al Schnier - guitar, vocals, keyboards
- Jim Loughlin - percussion

Production:

- Kenneth Gregory Allen - taping
- Bill Emmons - engineer, mixing
- Hank Lena - director
- Jon Topper, Alana Sarratore - associate producers
