= What Happened to the La Las =

Studio album by moe.
- Released: January 24, 2012
- Genre: Rock
- Length: 45:25
- Label: Sugar Hill
- Producer: John Travis

Moe. chronology
Dr. Stan's Prescription, Volume 2 (2009)	What Happened to the La Las (2012)	No Guts, No Glory (2014)

Professional ratings
Review scores
Source	Rating
AllMusic	3.5/5 stars
Premier Guitar	4.5/5 stars
American Songwriter	4/5 stars
PopMatters	7/10 stars
Glide Magazine	3.5/5 stars

What Happened to the La Las is the tenth studio album by the American rock band moe. It was released on January 24, 2012.

As per usual, most of the songs on this album were road-tested prior to being recorded. "The Bones Of Lazarus" is a reworking of an earlier live favorite, simply called "Lazarus." The composition was renamed in recognition of the 2012 novel, The Bones of Lazarus. Two of the songs – "Chromatic Nightmare" and "Suck A Lemon" – were originally conceived for a themed 2010 performance known as "The Electric Lemoe.nade Acid Test". Although "Haze" was written and originally sung by guitarist Al Schnier, the mic was handed over to bassist Rob Derhak for this album version, and he has handled the vocals on most versions performed since.

A deluxe edition of the album was released with a second disc containing acoustic versions of all the songs.

== Track listing ==
1. "The Bones of Lazarus" (Rob Derhak) – 3:56
2. "Haze" (Al Schnier) – 5:12
3. "Downward Facing Dog" (Schnier) – 7:54
4. "Rainshine" (Schnier) – 4:39
5. "Smoke" (Schnier) – 3:39
6. "Paper Dragon" (Derhak) – 4:48
7. "Chromatic Nightmare" (Jim Loughlin) – 3:43
8. "Puebla" (Schnier) – 4:10
9. "One Way Traffic" (Derhak) – 2:54
10. "Suck a Lemon" (Chuck Garvey) – 4:30

== Personnel ==
- Rob Derhak – lead vocals, bass guitar
- Al Schnier – lead vocals, guitar, keyboards, mandolin
- Chuck Garvey – lead vocals, guitar
- Vinnie Amico – drums
- Jim Loughlin – percussion, MalletKat, DrumKat, timpani, Rhodes on "Downward Facing Dog"
