= Dr. Stan's Prescription, Volume 2 =

Live album by moe.
- Released: February 10, 2009
- Recorded: August 31, 2001
- Genres: Rock, jam band
- Producer: moe.

Moe. chronology
| Dr. Stan's Prescription, Volume 1 (2008) | Dr. Stan's Prescription, Volume 2 (2009) | What Happened to the La Las (2012) |

Professional ratings
Review scores
| Source | Rating |
|---|---|
| AllMusic | 3.5/5 stars |

Dr. Stan's Prescription, Volume 2 is a limited edition, live archival recording by the American rock band moe. Chosen by band archivist Dr. Stan Lobitz, it chronicles the first night of the second annual moe.down in Turin, New York on August 31, 2001. It was released on February 10, 2009.

== Track listing ==
Disc one

1. "Intro" – 2:31
2. "Moth" – 16:02
3. "Lazarus" – 20:47
4. "Bring You Down" – 18:27
5. "Brent Black" – 18:58

Disc two

1. "Bass Jam" – 15:24
2. "St. Augustine" – 17:48
3. "Time Ed" – 26:15
4. "Moth (Reprise)" – 6:20
5. "Banter" – 3:29
6. "(Don't Fear) The Reaper" – 8:01

== Personnel ==
moe.

- Vinnie Amico – drums
- Rob Derhak – bass, vocals
- Chuck Garvey – guitar, vocals
- Jim Loughlin – percussion
- Al Schnier – guitar, keyboards, vocals

Production

- Produced by moe.
- Archived by Dr. Stan Lobitz
