= Season's Greetings from Moe =

Studio album (Christmas) by Moe
- Released: October 31, 2002
- Recorded: September 2002
- Genre: Rock
- Label: Fatboy Records
- Producer: Moe

Moe chronology
Warts and All: Volume 2 (2002)	Season's Greetings from Moe (2002)	Wormwood (2003)

Professional ratings
Review scores
Source	Rating
Allmusic	3/5 stars

Season's Greetings from Moe is a Christmas-themed album by the American jam band Moe.

When explaining the album on the band's official website, Moe member Chuck Garvey wrote the following:

"OK, here's the deal. Recently, we were going out to do a short group of shows. Early on, Rob (who is a complete Christmasaholic) came up with the idea to record a Holiday album. We had just finished with mixing and mastering a studio album that was set to be released in about five months, yet here we were talking about making ANOTHER recording that had to be ready in one-fifth the time. So all sudden-like, we were in backstage rooms across the midwest, listening to Christmas albums IN SEPTEMBER to "get in the mood". (It's not even HALLOWEEN yet!!!) We adopted a commando style of learning songs, arranging and recording live during our sound checks - sometimes three songs a day! This was definitely a fun thing to do, yet also a little surreal considering the fact that I refuse to let go of summer at this time. This recording exists primarily because Rob IS "Robbie Christmas" and he infected us all with his "sickness" early in the year!"

== Track listing ==
1. Carol of the Bells (Mykola Leontovych)
2. Together at Christmas (Rob Derhak)
3. Blue Christmas (Billy Hayes / Jay W. Johnson)
4. We're a Couple of Misfits (Johnny Marks)
5. Oh Hanukah (traditional)
6. Home (Al Schnier)
7. Silent Night/Jesu, Joy of Man's Desiring (Franz Xaver Gruber/Joseph Mohr // J.S. Bach)
8. Linus and Lucy (Vince Guaraldi)
9. Little Drummer Boy (Simeone/Davis/Onorati)
10. Jingle Bells (James Lord Pierpont)

All songs arranged by Moe.

== Personnel ==
- Moe
  - Vinnie Amico – drums
  - Rob Derhak – bass, percussion, vocals
  - Chuck Garvey – guitar (acoustic, electric), percussion, vocals
  - Jim Loughlin – guitar (acoustic), percussion
  - Al Schnier – guitar, piano, vocals, moog synthesizer
- Becca Childs Derhak – art direction
- Bill Emmons – engineer, mixing
- Catherine Henderson – vocals
- Reuben Kaller – assistant engineer
- Fred Kevorkian – mastering
- Amy Ross – album art
