= Live at the Fillmore =

Live at the Fillmore and similar names may refer to any of the following live albums, recorded at any of the concert venues known as "the Fillmore".

== Fillmore venues ==
- The Fillmore in San Francisco
- The Fillmore West in San Francisco
- The Fillmore East in New York City
- The Fillmore New York at Irving Plaza in New York City
- The Fillmore Auditorium in Denver
- The Fillmore Detroit in Detroit
- The Fillmore Silver Spring in Silver Spring, Maryland

== Albums with names like Live at the Fillmore ==
| Album name | Performer | Venue | Date recorded | Year released |
|---|---|---|---|---|
| At Fillmore East | The Allman Brothers Band | Fillmore East, New York City | March 12–13,1971 | 1971 |
| Fillmore East, February 1970 | The Allman Brothers Band | Fillmore East, New York City | February 1970 | 1996 |
| Fillmore West '71 | The Allman Brothers Band | Fillmore West, San Francisco | January 29–31, 1971 | 2019 |
| Between the Lines: Sara Bareilles Live at the Fillmore | Sara Bareilles | The Fillmore, San Francisco | 2008 | 2008 |
| Live at Fillmore Auditorium | Chuck Berry | The Fillmore, San Francisco | June 1967 | 1967 |
| Live at the Fillmore - February 1969 | The Byrds | Fillmore West, San Francisco | February 1969 | 2000 |
| Mad Dogs & Englishmen: The Complete Fillmore East Concerts | Joe Cocker | Fillmore East, New York City | March 27-28,1970 | 2006 |
| Live at Fillmore West | King Curtis | Fillmore West, San Francisco | March 5–7,1971 | 1971 |
| Live at the Fillmore | Cypress Hill | The Fillmore, San Francisco | 2000 | 2000 |
| Live at the Fillmore | Dark Star Orchestra | The Fillmore, San Francisco | May 8, 2004 | 2005 |
| Live at the Fillmore East, March 7, 1970: It's About that Time | Miles Davis | Fillmore East, New York City | March 7,1970 | 2001 |
| Black Beauty: Miles Davis at Fillmore West | Miles Davis | Fillmore West, San Francisco | April 10,1970 | 1973 |
| Miles at the Fillmore – Miles Davis 1970: The Bootleg Series Vol. 3 | Miles Davis | Fillmore East, New York City and Fillmore West, San Francisco | April 11 & June 17–20,1970 | 2014 |
| Miles Davis at Fillmore | Miles Davis | Fillmore East, New York City | June 17–20,1970 | 1970 |
| Live at the Fillmore | Derek and the Dominos | Fillmore East, New York City | October 23-24,1970 | 1994 |
| Live at the Fillmore | Dredg | The Fillmore, San Francisco | 2006 | 2006 |
| Aretha Live at Fillmore West | Aretha Franklin | Fillmore West, San Francisco | 1971 | 1971 |
| At the Fillmore | Hanson | The Fillmore, San Francisco | 2000 | 2001 |
| Live at the Fillmore East 2-11-69 | Grateful Dead | Fillmore East, New York City | February 11,1969 | 1997 |
| Fillmore West 1969: The Complete Recordings | Grateful Dead | Fillmore West, San Francisco | February 27 - March 2, 1969 | 2005 |
| Fillmore Auditorium, San Francisco, CA, July 3, 1966 | Grateful Dead | The Fillmore, San Francisco | July 3, 1966 | 2026 |
| Live at the Fillmore East | Jimi Hendrix | Fillmore East, New York City | 1969–70 | 1999 |
| Fillmore East 1968 | Iron Butterfly | Fillmore East, New York City | 1968 | 2011 |
| Live at the Fillmore East | Jefferson Airplane | Fillmore East, New York City | 1968 | 1998 |
| Sweeping Up the Spotlight: Live at the Fillmore East 1969 | Jefferson Airplane | Fillmore East, New York City | 1969 | 2007 |
| Live at the Fillmore Auditorium 10/15/66: Late Show – Signe's Farewell | Jefferson Airplane | The Fillmore, San Francisco | October 15, 1966 | 2010 |
| Live at Fillmore East: November 21 & 22, 1969 | King Crimson | Fillmore East, New York City | November 21-22, 1969 | 2004 |
| Fillmore East: The Lost Concert Tapes 12/13/68 | Al Kooper and Mike Bloomfield | Fillmore East, New York City | December 13–14, 1968 | 2003 |
| Live at the Fillmore | Los Lonely Boys | The Fillmore, San Francisco | 2005 | 2005 |
| moe.: Live at the Fillmore | moe. | Fillmore Auditorium, Denver | 2005 | 2006 |
| Live at the Fillmore 1969 | The Move | The Fillmore, San Francisco | 1969 | 2011 |
| Spread Your Wings and Fly: Live at the Fillmore East | Laura Nyro | Fillmore East, New York City | 1971 | 2004 |
| Live at the Fillmore | Ozomatli | The Fillmore, San Francisco | 2005 | 2005 |
| Live at the Fillmore 1997 | Tom Petty and the Heartbreakers | The Fillmore, San Francisco | January 31 – February 7, 1997 | 2022 |
| Live at the Fillmore | The Residents | The Fillmore, San Francisco | 1997 | 1998 |
| Live at the Fillmore 1968 | Santana | Fillmore West, San Francisco | December 19-22, 1968 | 1997 |
| Live at the Fillmore East: October 4th & 5th, 1968 | Sly and the Family Stone | Fillmore East, New York City | October 4–5, 1968 | 2015 |
| Live at the Fillmore East 1970 | Ten Years After | Fillmore East, New York City | February 27–28, 1970 | 2001 |
| Live at the Fillmore | Testament | Fillmore West, San Francisco | 1995 | 1995 |
| Fillmore: The Last Days | various artists | Fillmore West, San Francisco | June 29–July 4,1971 | 1972 |
| Live at the Fillmore | Vida Blue | The Fillmore, San Francisco | 2004 | 2004 |
| Live at the Fillmore East 1968 | The Who | Fillmore East, New York City | April 5-6, 1968 | 2018 |
| Live @ the Fillmore | Lucinda Williams | The Fillmore, San Francisco | 2003 | 2005 |
| Live at the Fillmore East 10/3/70 | Johnny Winter | Fillmore East, New York City | October 3, 1970 | 2010 |
| Live at the Fillmore East | Neil Young | Fillmore East, New York City | March 6-7, 1970 | 2006 |
| Fillmore East - June 1971 | Frank Zappa/The Mothers | Fillmore East, New York City | June 5–6, 1971 | 1971 |

== Other albums recorded at the Fillmore ==
| Album name | Performer | Venue | Date recorded | Year released |
|---|---|---|---|---|
| Eat a Peach | The Allman Brothers Band | Fillmore East, New York City (except for the 6 studio tracks) | March 12–13 & June 27,1971 | 1972 |
| Wheels of Fire | Cream | Lp two is titled 'Live at the Fillmore': but only 1 track recorded at The Fillmore, San Francisco, rest at Winterland | March 1968 | 1968 |
| On the Crest of the Airwaves | Miles Davis | Disc 2 of this boxed set recorded at the Fillmore West, San Francisco | October 15,1970 | 2011 |
| Dick's Picks Volume 16 | Grateful Dead | Fillmore Auditorium, San Francisco | November 7-8,1969 | 2000 |
| History of the Grateful Dead, Volume One (Bear's Choice) | Grateful Dead | Fillmore East, New York City | February 13-14, 1970 | 1973 |
| Dick's Picks Volume 4 | Grateful Dead | Fillmore East, New York City | February 13-14, 1970 | 1996 |
| Road Trips Volume 3 Number 3 | Grateful Dead | Fillmore East, New York City | May 5, 1970 | 2010 |
| Ladies and Gentlemen... the Grateful Dead | Grateful Dead | Fillmore East, New York City | April 25-29, 1971 | 2000 |
| Performance: Rockin' the Fillmore | Humble Pie | Fillmore East, New York City | May 28-29, 1971 | 1971 |
| Bless Its Pointed Little Head | Jefferson Airplane | Fillmore West, San Francisco, and Fillmore East, New York City | October and November 1968 | 1969 |
| The Turning Point | John Mayall | Fillmore East, New York City | July 12, 1969 | 1969 |
| Happy Trails | Quicksilver Messenger Service | Fillmore West, San Francisco, and Fillmore East, New York City | November 1968 | 1969 |
