= No Guts, No Glory (Moe album) =

Studio album by moe.
- Released: May 27, 2014
- Genre: Rock
- Length: 60:28
- Label: Sugar Hill, Vanguard
- Producer: Dave Aron

Moe. chronology
What Happened to the La Las (2012)	No Guts, No Glory (2014)	This Is Not, We Are (2020)

No Guts, No Glory is the eleventh studio album by the American rock band moe. It was released by Sugar Hill Records and Vanguard Records on May 27, 2014. moe. debuted the album live over the course of the 2014 Summer Camp Music Festival in Chillicothe, Illinois, allowing attendees to purchase the album at the concessions the weekend before its official release date.

The digital download and vinyl versions of the album contain three bonus tracks.

== Recording ==
According to moe. bassist and vocalist Rob Derhak, "Basically, everything we started out to do turned into completely something else. An album that was supposed to be an acoustic based album recorded in a barn turned into a hard rock album recorded in Connecticut with a hip-hop producer. Go figure."

== Critical reception ==
On jambands.com, Bill Clifford wrote, "No Guts, No Glory is a fitting title for the eleventh studio release from upstate New York’s improv rock stalwart moe. Having been making music together for nearly a quarter of a century, the quintet had intended to record an acoustic album, having previously recorded a bonus set of songs acoustically for their last studio recording. However, the band set those plans aside and threw caution to the wind, but it's a risk that has paid off."

On AllMusic, Stephen Thomas Erlewine said, "This is a group where interplay trumps all, which sometimes means they ride a groove, sometimes they lay back and solo, sometimes they cluster around a microphone and harmonize, sometimes they just enjoy the ruckus they cause.... This nimbleness, along with little bits of color like the sly marimba on "Calyphornya", is why No Guts, No Glory can seem simultaneously fresh and familiar."

In Relix, Jeff Miller wrote, "No other band in the scene is both as resilient and as divisive, which is why their new album, No Guts, No Glory, while absolutely likeable, isn't quite a revelation: This is the sound of a band getting older, comfortably, in a scene that sometimes would prefer some sort of evolution.... That said, by the end of the album... there's probably a problem if your head's not bobbing, even if it’s in a totally recognizable way."

On Live for Live Music, David Melamed said, "All in all, No Guts, No Glory is a fantastic album. The band runs the gamut of their musical styles, mixing longer, complicated compositions with simple, down-to-earth ones. A song like "Blonde Hair and Blue Eyes" will keep you singing along, while something like "Billy Goat" will have you on the edge of your seat."

On Grateful Web, Tim Hurley wrote, "It would appear they intended to go in one direction leaning heavily towards a relaxed, acoustic vibe but the finished product is far from that. The songs on No Guts, No Glory instead blend those elements of acoustic instrumentation with moe.'s usual upbeat electric rock, and in the end works out much better than previously planned. The mixing and reformation of song presentations give many of the tracks a truly progressive feel."

== Track listing ==
1. "Annihilation Blues" (Chuck Garvey) – 4:20
2. "White Lightning Turpentine" (Rob Derhak) – 4:41
3. "This I Know" (Alan Schnier) – 4:26
4. "Same Old Story" (Derhak) – 4:22
5. "Silver Sun" (Schnier) – 9:41
6. "Calyphornya" (Derhak) – 5:11
7. "Little Miss Cup Half Empty" (Schnier) – 5:18
8. "Blonde Hair and Blue Eyes" (Derhak) – 4:58
9. "Do or Die" (Schnier) – 3:49
10. "The Pines and the Apple Trees" (Derhak) – 3:52
11. "Billy Goat" (Derhak) – 9:36

Bonus tracks:

12. "Hey O" – 3:20
13. "Mar De Ma" – 3:11
14. "Runaway Overlude" – 5:28

== Personnel ==
moe.

- Chuck Garvey – guitar, acoustic guitar, vocals
- James Loughlin – percussion, mallets
- Rob Derhak – bass, vocals
- Vinnie Amico – drums
- Alan Schnier – guitar, acoustic guitar, piano, Hammond B3, mandolin, vocals

Additional musicians

- Dave Aron – clarinet on "Blond Hair and Blue Eyes"
- Willie Waldman – trumpet on "Blond Hair and Blue Eyes"
- Lukky Martin – trombone on "Blond Hair and Blue Eyes"

Production

- Produced and recorded by Dave Aron
- Mastering: Adam Ayan
- Cover art: Emek
- Design: Sue Meyer
- Photos: Jay Blakesberg
