= Loaf (album) =

Live album by moe.
- Released: February, 1996
- Recorded: November 24, 1995
- Label: Fatboy Records
- Producer: moe.

Moe. chronology
Headseed (1994)	Loaf (1996)	No Doy (1996)

Professional ratings
Review scores
Source	Rating
Allmusic	link

Loaf is the first live album release by the jam band moe. Recorded live at The Wetlands Preserve in New York City, New York on November 24 and 25 1995. 2,000 copies were released. It is out of print.

== Track listing ==
1. "Moth" (Schnier) – 6:55
2. "Rebubula" (Derhak) – 13:13
3. "Al's Ticket Spiel" (Schnier) – 0:17
4. "32 Things" (Schnier) – 9:27
5. "Buster" (Derhak) – 9:40
6. "Newt Slander" (moe.) – 0:29
7. "Meat" (moe.) – 14:05
8. "Seat of My Pants" (Schnier) – 8:52

== Personnel ==
moe.

- Rob Derhak – bass, songwriter, vocals, producer
- Chuck Garvey – guitar, songwriter, vocals, producer
- Al Schnier – guitar, songwriter, vocals, producer
- Mike Strazza – drums

Production:

- Brendan O'Neil – engineer, mixing
