= Moe. Sells Out =

Live album by moe.
- Released: September __, 1998
- Recorded: July 17, 1998
- Genre: Rock, jam
- Label: 550 Music

Moe. chronology
Tin Cans and Car Tires (1998)	Moe. Sells Out (1998)	L (2000)

Moe. Sells Out was a promotional tie-in with the jam band Moe's 1998 album Tin Cans & Car Tires. It was recorded live on July 17, 1998 at the Vic Theater in Chicago, Illinois. The album title is a take off from The Who's 1967 album The Who Sell Out.

== Track listing ==
1. "Stranger Than Fiction"
2. "Nebraska"
3. "Letter Home"
