= The Conch =

Studio album by Moe
- Released: January 23, 2007
- Recorded: 2005–2006
- Genre: Rock, jam, progressive rock
- Label: Fatboy Records
- Producer: Moe

Moe chronology
Warts and All: Volume 4 (2003)	The Conch (2007)	Warts and All: Volume 5 (2007)

Professional ratings
Review scores
Source	Rating
AllMusic	4/5 stars
Rolling Stone	4/5 stars

The Conch is the eighth studio album by the American rock band Moe. It was released on January 23, 2007, by Fatboy Records. The Conch was Moe's first studio release in four years.

== History ==
Since 2004, the band had been working on the follow-up to their 2003 release Wormwood. The band had debuted well over a dozen new songs since Wormwood, but had indicated in articles and interviews that there were some songs that they had recorded that they hadn't even performed live yet. As with the previous album, the band decided to try to record and then mix in live samples of their new songs from shows on June 10, 2005 and June 11, 2005 in order to create a meld between studio and live settings. The band performed these two special shows in Portland, Maine and recorded the audio for possible inclusion on the new album. For this reason, the band, usually taper-friendly, did not allow audio taping by the fans for these two shows.

- Rob Derhak on the new album (2/24/06):

We thought we were done [with the new 2006 album], but we're not. We're going back into the studio to adjust a few things, and we'll probably end up replacing a couple songs that we were originally going to put on there ... Sometimes it's hard to get enough time [between the album and touring]. What we really need is a second band.

In 2006, it was announced that the new album would be released in January 2007 and would be called The Conch.

From clips that were available at the MTV and VH1 websites, it was determined that one track, "Y Eaux Massa", would be audio from the aforementioned shows. During intermission at the June 11, 2005 show, Al Schnier led the crowd in a repeating chant of "be on my side, I'll be on your side," which is a line from the chorus of "Wind It Up," the previous track on the album. When the pre-release sale for the album began on November 20, 2006, a free five song live EP was offered with each purchase. The EP included over 65 minutes of music from the shows mentioned above.

== Track listing ==
=== The Conch ===
1. "Blue Jeans Pizza" (Derhak) – 5:16
2. "Lost Along the Way" (Schnier) – 6:39
3. "The Conch" (Moe) – 0:54
4. "Tailspin" (Schnier) – 5:00
5. "Tubing the River Styx" -> (Moe) – 0:56
6. "The Pit" (Derhak) – 5:20
7. "Another One Gone" (Derhak) – 3:29
8. "Wind It Up" -> (Garvey) – 7:55
9. "Y Eaux Massa" (Moe) – 1:09
10. "Down Boy" (Derhak) – 5:51
11. "She" (Schnier) – 5:05
12. "Where Does the Time Go?" (Garvey) – 5:54
13. "Summer o i" (Derhak) – 4:16
14. "The Road" (Schnier) – 6:45
15. "MacIntyre Range" (Schnier) – 3:58
16. "The Col" (Moe) – 0:48
17. "Brittle End" (Derhak) – 5:36
18. "McBain" (iTunes Bonus Track) – 6:46

=== High and Congress ===
Bonus CD offered during preorder sale.

1. "The Road"
2. "The Pit"
3. "32 Things" (Schnier)
4. "St. Augustine" (Derhak)
5. "Rebubula" (Derhak)

== Personnel ==
Moe:

- Chuck Garvey – vocals, guitar, keyboards
- Rob Derhak – vocals, bass guitar, keyboards
- Vinnie Amico – drums, percussion
- Al Schnier – vocals, guitar, keyboards
- Jim Loughlin – percussion, marimba, vibraphone, MalletKat

== Charts ==
Album – Billboard

Year	Chart	Position
2007	Billboard 200 (U.S.)	120
2007	Billboard Heatseekers (U.S.)	1
2007	Billboard Top Independent Albums (U.S.)	9
2007	Billboard Top Internet Albums (U.S.)	120
