= Direction Records =

Direction Records may refer to:

- Direction Records (British label), a British record label founded by CBS Records (now Sony Music) in 1967 specializing in American R&B acts.
- Direction Records (Bobby Darin's label), a custom record label founded by Bobby Darin to issue his own recordings.
