= Life (Sly and the Family Stone album) =

Studio album by Sly and the Family Stone
- Released: September 1968
- Recorded: May 1968
- Studio: Pacific High (San Francisco)
- Genre: Psychedelic soul, psychedelic funk
- Length: 30:33
- Label: Epic
- Producer: Sly Stone

Sly and the Family Stone chronology
Dance to the Music (1968)	Life (1968)	Stand! (1969)

Singles from Life
- 1. "Life" Released: June 14, 1968

Professional ratings
Review scores
Source	Rating
AllMusic	4.5/5 stars
Austin Chronicle	3.5/5 stars
The Guardian	3/5 stars
PopMatters	9/10 stars
Rolling Stone (1968)	(Favorable)
Rolling Stone (2007)	3.5/5 stars
Stylus	(B)
Uncut	4/5 stars
Yahoo! Music	(Favorable)

Life is the third studio album by American funk-soul band Sly and the Family Stone, released in September 1968 on Epic and CBS Records. The album was titled M'Lady in the United Kingdom.

== Music ==
Unlike its predecessor, Dance to the Music, Life was not a commercial success, although it has received mostly positive reviews from music critics over the years. Many of its songs, including "M'Lady", "Fun", "Love City", as well as the title track, became popular staples in the Family Stone's live show. A middle ground between the fiery A Whole New Thing and the more commercial Dance to the Music, Life features very little use of studio effects, and is instead more driven by frontman Sly Stone's compositions. Topics for the album's songs include the dating scene ("Dynamite!", "Chicken", "M'Lady"), groupies ("Jane is a Groupee"), and "plastic" (or "fake") people (the Beatlesque "Plastic Jim", which references "Eleanor Rigby" in its chorus). Of particular note is that the Family Stone's main themes of unity and integration are explored here in several songs ("Fun", "Harmony", "Life", and "Love City"). The next Family Stone LP, Stand!, would focus almost exclusively on these topics.

Much of Life has been heavily sampled for hip hop and electronica recordings, particularly Gregg Errico's drum solo on "Love City". The opening riff on "Into My Own Thing" was sampled for Fatboy Slim's 2001 hit "Weapon of Choice".

== Reception ==
The September 24th issue of Cash Box suggests that the album was issued in a 7" album format (cat Epic 26397). The reviewer said that Sly & the Family Stone had emerged as one of the most popular groups to jukebox audiences across the US. The reviewer said that the group came across better live but the songs on the disc, "Chicken", "Harmony", "Fun", "Into My Own Thing", "Love City" and "M’Lady" should excite spots from coast to coast.

Released in the UK as M'Lady on the Direction label, the album was reviewed by Melody Maker in the UK magazine's 18 January 1969 issue. Reviewer Chris Welch gave it a positive review with emphasis on the appeal being more for those who like discotheque excitement rather than for those who like their pop subtle or progressive. He finished off with, "if you like balling, you won't miss out on this."

It was reviewed in the 8 February 1969 issue of UK magazine Record Mirror. It was given four stars. After mentioning the liner notes by Rosko and how he was in favor of the "all-out attacking music of this violent group", the reviewer said that there was no room for delicacy when Sly & the Family Stone were on the move. The reviewer also said that the group went for the party atmosphere and hammer everything in sight. It may have been a bit strong on the ear for the reviewer, but the dancing value was mentioned.

== Track listing ==
All tracks written by Sylvester Stewart, and produced and arranged by Sly Stone for Stone Flower Productions.

Side one

1. "Dynamite!" – 2:44
2. "Chicken" – 2:13
3. "Plastic Jim" – 3:29
4. "Fun" – 2:23
5. "Into My Own Thing" – 2:13
6. "Harmony" – 2:51

Side two

1. "Life" – 3:01
2. "Love City" – 2:43
3. "I'm an Animal" – 3:21
4. "M'Lady" – 2:46
5. "Jane Is a Groupee" – 2:49

=== CD bonus tracks ===
- 1995 limited edition CD reissue
  - "Only One Way Out of This Mess" – 3:51
- 2007 limited edition CD reissue
  - "Dynamite" (mono single version) - 2:08
  - "Seven More Days" (previously unreleased) - 3:24
  - "Pressure" (previously unreleased) - 3:44
  - "Sorrow" (previously unreleased) - 3:19

== Personnel ==
Sly and the Family Stone

- Sly Stone – vocals, organ, guitar, piano, harmonica, and more
- Freddie Stone – vocals, guitar
- Larry Graham – vocals, bass guitar
- Rosie Stone – vocals, piano, keyboard
- Cynthia Robinson – trumpet, vocal ad-libs
- Jerry Martini – saxophone
- Greg Errico – drums
- Little Sister (Vet Stone, Mary McCreary, Elva Mouton) – backing vocals

Technical

- Marty Wekser – editing supervisor
- Don Puluse, Fred Catero, Roy Segal – engineer
