= Dave Aron =

Multi-platinum recording engineer/live/studio mixer/record producer/musician

David Aron in 2019.

David Royce Aron (August 29, 1964 – March 11, 2019) was an American recording engineer, live and studio mixer, record producer, and musician.

== Early life ==
Aron was born and raised in Asbury Park, New Jersey, the son of 1950s be-bop trumpet player Al Aron and twenty-year band director Dotte Marshall. He attended Asbury Park High School, where he played the clarinet in his school's marching and jazz bands. In 1982, after attending Rutgers University for a year, he enrolled in the University of Memphis' recording program, where he split his time between the recording studios and the football field as a walk-on tight end.

== Career ==
Dave Aron began with an internship at WHBQ radio and Ardent Studios in Memphis, Tennessee. In 1987, he landed his first professional job at Sun Studios, where he worked as studio manager and chief engineer, eventually working with U2 when the band recorded some songs for their Rattle and Hum album. In 1990, Aron moved to Los Angeles and began working at Music Grinder Recording. He later landed a staff engineer position at Larrabee Sound Studios.

While at Larrabee, Dave worked with multiple artists and producers such as Dr. Dre, Prince on "My Name is Prince", "Sexy MF", and an acoustic version of "7", which Aron mixed and released as a single. In 1993, Dave Aron would engineer at Can-Am Studios and begin a long affiliation with Death Row Records. He served as engineer and mixer for Tupac Shakur's album All Eyez on Me, featuring K-Ci & JoJo and DeVante Swing of Jodeci, with seven famous songs released — "Ambitionz az a Ridah", "How Do U Want It", "2 of Amerikaz Most Wanted", "I Ain't Mad at Cha", "California Love", "Can't C Me" and "All Eyez on Me" — the album took the No. 1 spot on the Billboard 200 and R&B/Hip-Hop Albums charts. All Eyez On Me became 2Pac's highest-selling album officially going 10× Multi-Platinum as of July 23, 2014.

Dave Aron is responsible for mixing all of Snoop Dogg's albums from Doggystyle to Tha Blue Carpet Treatment. In 1996, ska reggae-tinged rock band Sublime hired Aron as the producer for their self-titled debut Sublime. His influence can be heard on their single "What I Got" which reached #1 on Billboard's Modern Rock chart and helped sell over five million copies of their album. Dave also collaborated on a Snoop Dogg and Sublime remix of "Doin' Time", released in 2005. Snoop Dogg hired Aron to be his exclusive live sound engineer. Dave would go on to mix every show for over 20 years professionally with Snoop Dogg until health problems intervened, making extensive touring impossible.

In 2011, Dave Aron built his own studio called Hollywood Way Studios in Burbank, California where he would record, track and mix national recording artists. Def Jam Recording Artist YG recorded his platinum debut album titled My Krazy Life produced by DJ Mustard at Hollywood Way with the multi-platinum hit single "My Nigga" which peaked at number 19 on the US Billboard Hot 100. On April 4, 2018, the single was certified quadruple platinum by the Recording Industry Association of America for combined sales and streaming data of over 4,000,000 units in the United States. Along with many famous American rappers, DJ Quik recorded, tracked and mixed his ninth studio album The Midnight Life at Dave Aron's Hollywood Way Studios. Dave held educational seminars worldwide to help teach music, mixing, engineering and the music industry to aspiring students. He created a series of instructional mixing tutorial videos entitled Platinum Hip Hop Mixing.

== Select discography ==
Aron's credits adapted from AllMusic catalog include

Year	Album/song	Artist
1992	"7"	Prince
1992	"My Name Is Prince"	Prince
1995	Dogg Food	Tha Dogg Pound
1995	Friday (Original Motion Picture Soundtrack)	various artists
1996	All Eyez on Me	2Pac
1996	Death Row Greatest Hits	various artists
1996	Sublime	Sublime
1997	Gridlock'd – The Soundtrack	various artists
1999	Still I Rise	2Pac + Outlawz
2000	Snoop Dogg Presents: Tha Eastsidaz	Tha Eastsidaz
2001	The Wash (The Original Motion Picture Soundtrack)	various artists
2001	Music & Me	Nate Dogg
2001	Duces 'n Trayz: The Old Fashioned Way	Tha Eastsidaz
2002	Paid tha Cost to Be da Boss	Snoop Dogg
2004	The Hard Way	213
2004	R&G (Rhythm & Gangsta): The Masterpiece	Snoop Dogg
2005	Naked Truth	Lil' Kim
2006	Tha Blue Carpet Treatment	Snoop Dogg
2007	Double Up	R. Kelly
2007	Running Your Mouth	The Notorious B.I.G.
2008	Snoop Dogg Presents: Dubb Union	Dubb Union
2014	No Guts, No Glory	moe.
