= Oropharyngeal cancer =

Pharynx cancer that is located in the oropharynx

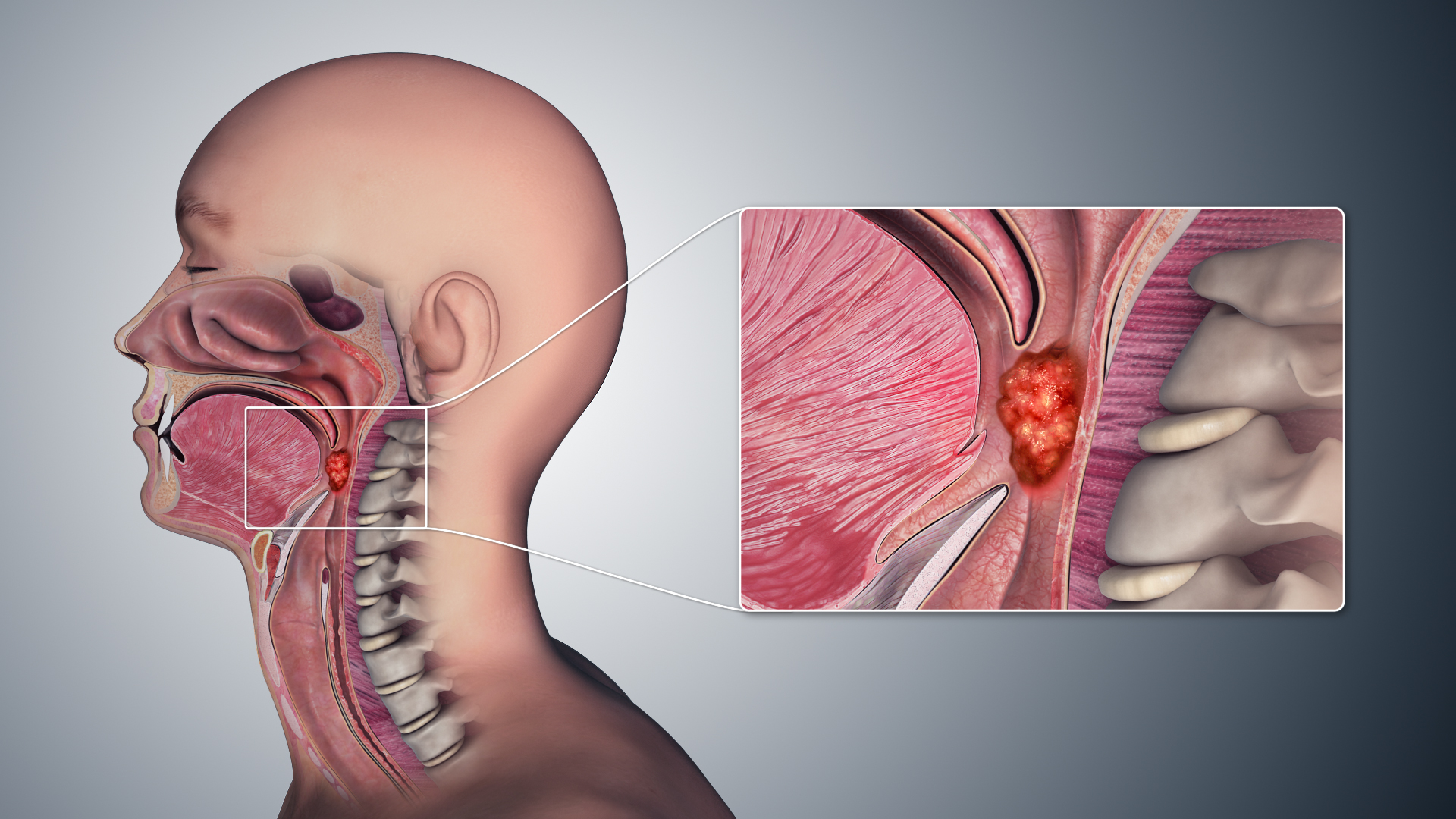
- 3D medical illustration showing the cancer formation in the tissues of the oropharynx
- Specialty: Oncology, head and neck surgery
- Symptoms: Sore or blister in back of mouth, difficulty with speech, swallowing or breathing, swelling in neck, loss of appetite, loss of weight, and weakness
- Causes: Human papillomavirus (HPV), tobacco use (smoking and chewing), alcohol use disorder (long-term effects)
- Diagnostic method: Endoscopy, biopsy, staining for p16, CT scan
- Prevention: HPV vaccine
- Treatment: Surgery, radiation, chemotherapy

Oropharyngeal cancer, also known as oropharyngeal squamous cell carcinoma and tonsil cancer, is a disease in which abnormal cells with the potential to both grow locally and spread to other parts of the body are found in the oral cavity, in the tissue of the part of the throat (oropharynx) that includes the base of the tongue, the tonsils, the soft palate, and the walls of the pharynx.

The two types of oropharyngeal cancers are HPV-positive oropharyngeal cancer, which is caused by an oral human papillomavirus infection; and HPV-negative oropharyngeal cancer, which is linked to use of alcohol, tobacco, or both.

Oropharyngeal cancer is diagnosed by biopsy of observed abnormal tissue in the throat. Oropharyngeal cancer is staged according to the appearance of the abnormal cells on the biopsy coupled with the dimensions and the extent of the abnormal cells found. Treatment is with surgery, chemotherapy, or radiation therapy, or some combination of those treatments.

== Signs and symptoms ==
The signs and symptoms of oropharyngeal cancer may include:

- A sore throat that persists for over 2 weeks
- Throat pain or difficulty swallowing
- Unexplained rapid weight loss
- Voice changes (more hoarse)
- Ear pain
- A lump in the back of the throat or mouth
- A lump in the neck
- A dull pain behind the sternum
- Persistent cough
- Breathing problems

== Risk factors ==
The risk factors that can increase the risk of developing oropharyngeal cancer are:

=== Major ===
- Performing open-mouthed kissing or oral/mouth-genital sex on a person(s) with a human papillomavirus infection (HPV); there are nearly 200 distinct human papillomaviruses (HPVs), and many HPV types are carcinogenic.
- Smoking and chewing tobacco (see Health effects of tobacco);
- Heavy alcohol use (see Long-term effects of alcohol consumption).

=== Minor ===
- A diet low in fruit and vegetables;
- Chewing paan (betel quid), a stimulant commonly used in Southern and Southeast Asia;
- Marijuana smoking (see Effects of cannabis);
- Asbestos exposure (see Asbestos-related diseases);
- Certain genetic changes including: P53 mutation and CDKN2A (p16) mutations;
- Poor nutrition;
- Plummer–Vinson syndrome.

=== Precancerous lesions ===
==== High-risk ====
- Erythroplakia;
- Speckled erythroplakia;
- Chronic hyperplastic candidiasis.

==== Medium-risk ====
- Oral submucosal fibrosis;
- Syphilitic glossitis;
- Sideropenic dysphagia (Paterson-Kelly-Brown syndrome).

==== Low-risk ====
- Oral lichen planus;
- Discoid lupus erythematosus;
- Discoid keratosis congenita.

== Pathophysiology ==
The cancer can spread three ways:

- Cancer invades the surrounding normal tissues;
- Cancer invades the lymph system and travels through the lymph vessels to other places in the body;
- Cancer invades the veins and capillaries and travels through the blood to other places in the body.

== Diagnosis ==
Oropharyngeal cancer (from right tonsil, HPV-negative), T4a N2c, 48-year-old man

Diagnosis is by biopsy of observed abnormal tissue in the oropharynx.

=== Stages ===
The National Cancer Institute (2016) provides the following definition:

==== Stage 0 (carcinoma in situ) ====
Abnormal cells are found in the lining of the oropharynx. These may become cancer and spread into nearby normal tissue.

==== Stage 1 ====
Cancer has formed and is 20 mm or smaller and has not spread outside the oropharynx.

==== Stage 2 ====
Cancer has formed and is larger than 20 mm, but not larger than 40 mm. Also, it has not yet spread outside the oropharynx.

==== Stage 3 ====
- Cancer is larger than 40 mm and has not spread outside the oropharynx.
- Any size and has spread to only one lymph node on the same side of the neck as the cancer. The lymph node with cancer is 30 mm or smaller.

==== Stage 4A ====
- Cancer has spread to tissues near the oropharynx, including the larynx (voice box), roof of the mouth, lower jaw, muscle of the tongue, or central muscles of the jaw, and may have spread to one or more nearby lymph nodes; none is larger than 60 mm.
- Cancer is any size and has spread to one lymph node that is larger than 30 mm, but not larger than 60 mm on the same side of the neck as the cancer or to more than one lymph node, none larger than 60 mm, on one of both sides of the neck.

==== Stage 4B ====
- Cancer surrounds the main artery in the neck or has spread to bones in the jaw or skull, to muscle in the side of the jaw, or to the upper part of the throat behind the nose, and may have spread to nearby lymph nodes.
- Cancer has spread to a lymph node that is larger than 60 mm and may have spread to tissues around the oropharynx.

==== Stage 4C ====
Cancer has spread to other parts of the body; the tumor may be any size and may have spread to lymph nodes.

== Prevention ==
Regarding the primary prevention of HPV-positive oropharyngeal cancer, HPV vaccines show more than 90% efficacy in preventing vaccine-type HPV infections and their correlated anogenital precancerous lesions. A research conducted in 2017 demonstrated that HPV vaccination induces HPV antibodies levels at the oral cavity that correlate with circulating levels.

Regarding the primary prevention of HPV-positive oropharyngeal cancer, safe oral sex habits should be advised (see Sex education). Regarding the primary prevention of HPV-negative oropharyngeal cancer, educating people on the risks of chewing betel quid, alcohol use, and tobacco smoking is of the prime importance in the control and prevention of oropharyngeal cancers.

== Prognosis ==
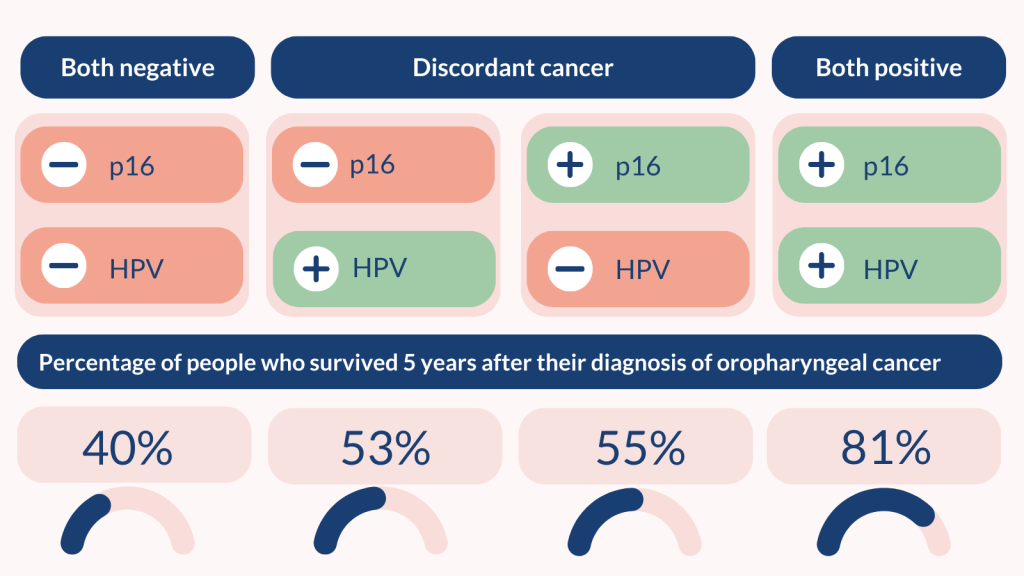
Types of oropharyngeal cancer and associated survival rates

People with HPV-positive oropharyngeal cancer tend to have higher survival rates. However, HPV is tested for by the presence of the biomarker p16, which normally increases in the presence of HPV. Some people can have elevated levels of p16 but test negative for HPV and vice versa. This is known as discordant cancer. The five-year survival for people who test positive for HPV and p16 is 81%, for discordant cancer it is 53 – 55%, and 40% for those who test negative for p16 and HPV. The prognosis for people with oropharyngeal cancer depends on the age and health of the person and the stage of the disease. It is important for people with oropharyngeal cancer to have follow-up exams for the rest of their lives, as cancer can occur in nearby areas. In addition, it is important to eliminate risk factors such as smoking and drinking alcohol, which increase the risk for second cancers.

== Management ==
Traditionally, oropharyngeal cancer has been managed through combination of surgery and radiotherapy. Other treatments have been developed including a combination of surgery, radiotherapy, chemotherapy and immunotherapy, but with limited improvement in survival rates. Studies comparing different combinations of treatment on patient outcomes have shown insufficient evidence that any treatment combination is superior to others.

== Society and culture ==
- In 1989, Monty Python member Graham Chapman died of oropharyngeal cancer, on the eve of the 20th anniversary of the first broadcast of Flying Circus.
- In 1995, actress Lana Turner died from oropharyngeal cancer three years after diagnosis.
- In 2010, American actor Michael Douglas reported that he was diagnosed with oropharyngeal cancer.
- In 2014, Japanese musician and composer Ryuichi Sakamoto released a statement indicating that he had been diagnosed with oropharyngeal cancer in late June of the same year.
- In 2014, American musician and rhythm guitar player of Green Day, Jason White, was diagnosed with oropharyngeal cancer on December 3.
- In 2015, British musician Bruce Dickinson was diagnosed, and took a one-year break from Iron Maiden while undergoing treatment.
- In 2017, Rob Derhak, bassist of the jam band moe, was diagnosed, prompting the band to go on indefinite hiatus.
- In 2023, Mike Ness, frontman of the punk band Social Distortion announced he had tonsil cancer and since recovered.

== See also ==
- Head and neck cancer
- Cancer of the larynx
- Thyroid cancer
