= Live at the Fillmore East October 4th & 5th, 1968 =

Live at the Fillmore East: October 4th & 5th 1968

Live album by Sly and the Family Stone
- Released: July 17, 2015
- Recorded: October 4–5, 1968
- Venue: Fillmore East, East Village, Manhattan, New York City, New York, US
- Genre: Funk
- Length: 208:05
- Language: English
- Label: Epic/Legacy
- Producer: Bob Irwin (2015 release); Sly Stone (original recordings)

Sly and the Family Stone chronology
Higher! (2013)	Live at the Fillmore East: October 4th & 5th 1968 (2015)	Woodstock: Sunday August 17, 1969 (2019)

Live at the Fillmore East: October 4th & 5th 1968 is a 2015 live album by American funk music group Sly and the Family Stone, released by Epic Records/Legacy Recordings. It has received positive reviews from critics.

== Reception ==
According to the review aggregator Metacritic, Live at the Fillmore East October 4th & 5th, 1968 received "universal acclaim" based on a weighted average score of 89 out of 100 from eight critic scores. Editors at AllMusic rated this album 4 out of 5 stars, with critic Andy Kellman writing that on this box set, "despite playing roughly the same songs each set while knowing that they were being recorded, the band continually switched up the sequencing of the set lists... and the musicians played loose enough to allow for some spontaneity and variable interaction" and "the whole gang is at the top of their game". In The Boston Globe, Colin Fleming praised several elements of the performance and ended by stating that "vintage audiophiles will just about bow down before the quality of these tapes". Douglas Wolk of Pitchfork Media rated this album a 7.9 out of 10 and stated that "a 35-minute, six-song Live at the Fillmore East would have been a drop-dead classic on the order of Sly and the Family Stone's next three actual albums, or nearly so... but if you care about Sly Stone in 2015, after decades of dashed expectations and bungled comebacks, you probably care enough to want to hear the outtakes and alternate versions from the album-that-might-have-been alongside the real thing". In PopMatters, Joe Sweeney wrote that the band "sounded like a perpetual motion machine far too powerful to ever break down" and rated Live at the Fillmore East October 4th & 5th, 1968 a 9 out of 10. Relix's Jesse Lauter worte that "the energy on these tapes is undeniable, displaying one of the most formidable bands ever assembled".

== Track listing ==
All songs written by Sylvester Stewart, except where noted

October 4, 1968 (1st Night) The Early Show

1. "Are You Ready" – 4:57
2. "Color Me True" – 4:55
3. "Won’t Be Long" (J. Leslie McFarland) – 6:55
4. "We Love All (Freedom)" – 8:25
5. Medley: "Turn Me Loose" / "I Can’t Turn You Loose" (Otis Redding) – 5:14
6. "Chicken" – 9:23
7. "Love City" – 8:53

October 4, 1968 (1st Night) The Late Show

1. "M'Lady" – 5:12
2. "Don’t Burn Baby" – 4:39
3. "Color Me True" – 6:03
4. "Won’t Be Long" (McFarland) – 6:41
5. "St. James Infirmary" – 7:40
6. Medley: "Turn Me Loose" / "I Can’t Turn You Loose" (Redding) – 5:47
7. "Are You Ready" – 5:46
8. "Dance to the Music" – 5:11
9. "Music Lover" – 8:08
10. Medley: "Life" / "Music Lover" – 9:12

October 5, 1968 (2nd Night) The Early Show

1. "Life" – 3:05
2. "Color Me True" – 6:03
3. "Won’t Be Long" (McFarland) – 7:15
4. "Are You Ready" – 6:20
5. "Dance to the Music" – 5:24
6. "Music Lover" – 6:19
7. "M’Lady" – 5:43

October 5, 1968 (2nd Night) The Late Show

1. "M’Lady" – 5:24
2. "Life" – 3:03
3. "Are You Ready" – 7:59
4. "Won’t Be Long" (McFarland) – 7:53
5. "Color Me True" – 6:26
6. "Dance to the Music" – 5:31
7. "Music Lover" – 5:51
8. "Love City" – 5:34
9. Medley: "Turn Me Loose" / "I Can’t Turn You Loose" (Redding) – 5:26
10. "The Riffs" – 1:49

== Personnel ==
Sly and the Family Stone

- Greg Errico – percussion
- Larry Graham – bass guitar, vocals
- Jerry Martini – saxophone
- Cynthia Robinson – trumpet
- Brother Freddie Stone – guitar, vocals
- Sister Rosie Stone – electric piano, vocals
- Sly Stone – organ, vocals, production for Stone Flower Productions

Additional personnel

- Vic Anesini – mastering at Battery Studios, New York City, New York, United States
- Bob Irwin – production for Legacy Recordings
- Arno Konings – liner notes
- Edwin Konings – liner notes
- Joseph M. Palmaccio – mixing at The Place...For Mastering Nashville, Tennessee, United States
- Amalie R. Rothschild – photography

== See also ==
- 1968 in music
- 2015 in American music
- List of 2015 albums
