= No Guts No Glory =

No Guts No Glory may refer to:

- No Guts...No Glory (Molly Hatchet album) (1983)
- No Guts No Glory!!, an album by Sunspot Jonz (2005)
- No Guts. No Glory., an album by Airbourne (2010)
- No Guts No Glory (Phyno album) (2014)
- No Guts, No Glory (Moe album) (2014)
- "No Guts, No Glory", theme song of The Adventures of the Galaxy Rangers
- "No Guts, No Glory", song by Bolt Thrower from Mercenary
- No Guts, No Glory, a song by Ran-D featuring Skits Vicious
- Adolf H. Lundin: No Guts No Glory, a biography about Adolf H. Lundin by Robert Eriksson (2003)
- No Guts, No Glori, a 2016 episode of The Loud House
