= Larrabee Sound Studios =

Recording studio complex in North Hollywood, US

Coordinates: 34.1456°N 118.3629°W

Larrabee Studios
- Industry: Recording studio
- Founded: North Hollywood, California, U.S. (1969)
- Founder: Carole King, Gerry Goffin
- Headquarters: North Hollywood, California, U.S.
- Number of locations: 1
- Owner: Manny Marroquin
- Website: www.larrabeestudios.com

Larrabee Sound Studios is a recording studio complex in North Hollywood, California, originally established in 1969.

== Facilities ==
Located at 4162 Lankershim Boulevard in North Hollywood, Larrabee has six studios, three tracking spaces, and a production/mastering suite, centered around a large, extensively-decorated atrium.

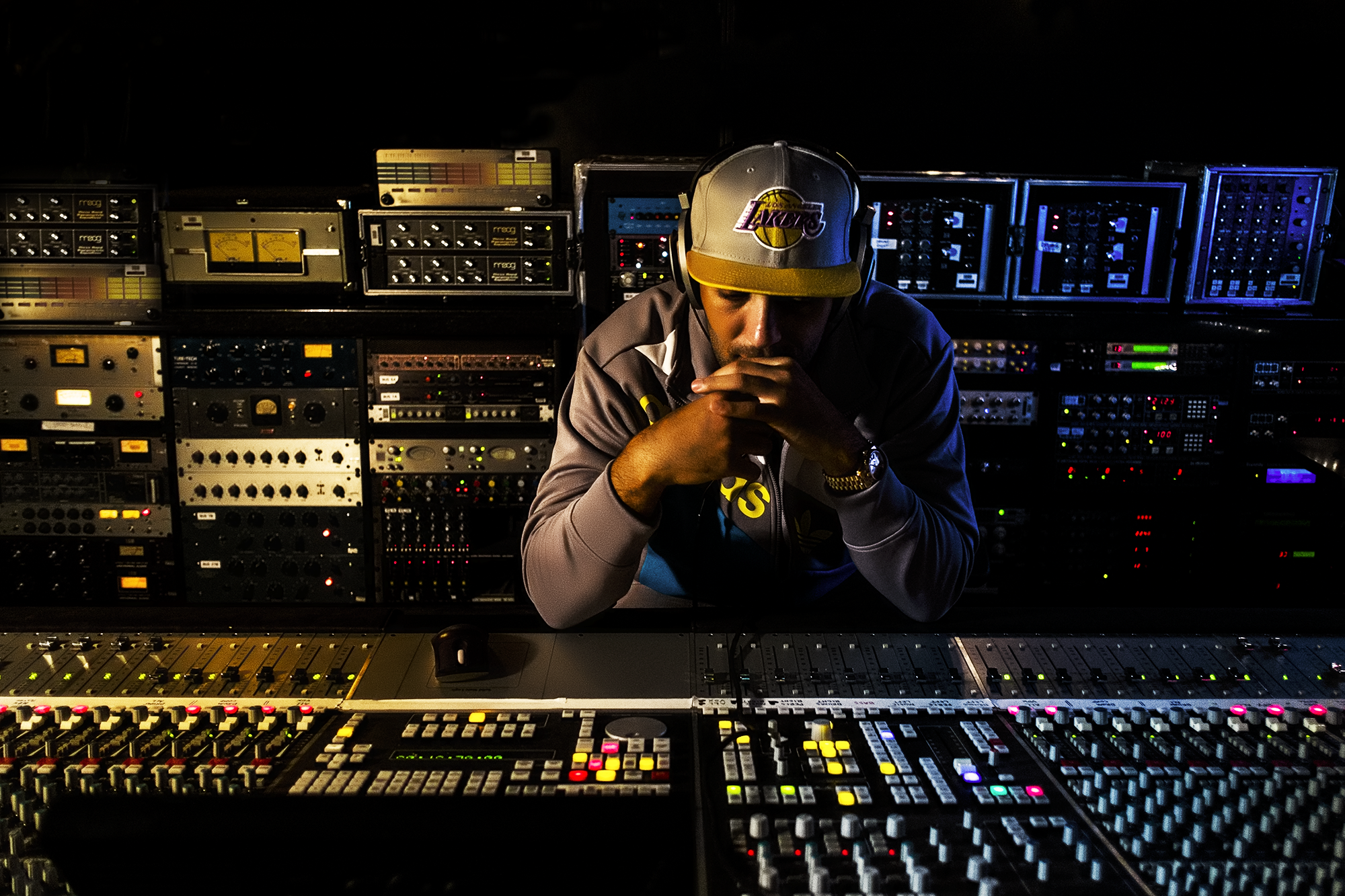
Jaycen Joshua at Larrabee

Studio 1, where Jaycen Joshua is resident mix engineer, is the second-largest studio space at Larrabee, with a 700-square-foot live room. An 80-channel Solid State Logic 9098 XL K-series console is the hub of this studio's 430-square-foot control room.

Studio 2, the home studio of mix engineer Manny Marroquin, has similar proportions and a similar console to Studio 1.

Studio 3 is slightly larger, and also has a recording console similar to Studio 1.

Studio 4, sometimes referred to as "The Rat Pack Room" has a 48-channel Solid State Logic Duality Delta console.

Studio 5 is a production room with two isolation booths.

Studio 6, formerly the Schnee Studio control room, has a 72-channel Solid State Logic Duality console.

Studio A, sometimes called the "Bordello Room" because of its crimson walls and velvet fabrics, is a smaller studio set up for mastering.

== History ==
=== Larrabee West ===
The original Larrabee Studio location, named after its location on Larrabee Street in West Hollywood, California was co-founded by singer-songwriter Carole King and her husband, lyricist Gerry Goffin in the 1960s. In 1969, Jackie Mills, a jazz drummer, record producer, and co-founder of the short-lived Ava Records, purchased the studio together with his wife Dolores Kaninger. The couple operated the studio until 1985, when they sold it to their son Kevin Mills. This original Larrabee Studio location became referred to as Larrabee West after the establishment of Larrabee North in 1991, and remained in operation until 2003.

=== Larrabee North ===
In 1991, Larrabee Studio acquired another studio located at 4162 Lankershim Boulevard in North Hollywood and renamed it Larrabee North. Originally founded by Len Kovner in 1973 as Davlen Sound Studios, Giorgio Moroder purchased the space in 1983 and renamed it Oasis Recording Studios. Teddy Riley was the first to work at Larrabee's new studio, producing tracks for Michael Jackson's Dangerous album. Both of the studios at this location underwent major remodels in 1995–1996, and Larrabee added a large atrium with lounge space in 2000. After selling Larrabee West, Larrabee North became the company headquarters and main location, referred to simply as Larrabee Studios.

=== Larrabee East ===
In 1999, Larrabee acquired Andora Studios, a facility in the Cahuenga Pass which was originally built in the 1970s as Tom Jones' Britannia studio. This studio became known as Larrabee East. In 2005, mix engineer Dave Way, his wife and former Larrabee East studio manager Jamie Way, and other investors purchased the studio, renaming it The Pass. As of 2013, the studio is owned by Japanese musician Yoshiki.

=== Schnee Studio ===
In 2015 Schnee Studio, which was located adjacent to Larrabee Studios, was sold and merged with Larrabee to become Larrabee Studio 6. In the late 2010s, this Larrabee studio was under extended lockout by Harvey Mason Jr.

== Notable personnel ==
- Dave Aron
- Dave Pensado
- Dave Way
- Jaycen Joshua
- Manny Marroquin
- Rob Chiarelli
- Sylvia Massy
