= M'Lady (Sly and the Family Stone song) =

"M'Lady" / "Life"

Single by Sly and the Family Stone

from the album Life
- A-side: "Life"
- B-side: "M'Lady"
- Released: 1968
- Label: Epic; 5-10353
- Songwriter: S. Stewart

Sly and the Family Stone singles chronology
"Dance to the Music" (1968)	"M'Lady" / "Life" (1968)	"Everyday People" (1968)

"M'Lady" was a 1968 song for Sly & the Family Stone. The B-side to their hit "Life", it became a chart hit for them that year.

== Background ==
"M'Lady" was originally the flip side to the US release of Sly & the Family Stone's single "Life". According to the 21 September issue of Melody Maker, Sly & the Family Stone were hopeful that fans who bought the single "Dance to the Music" would go for "M'Lady" due to similarities of the two.

The single was released in the UK with "M'Lady" as the A side on Direction 3808.

== Reception ==
With music magazine Billboard having "Life" as a Top 60 Spotlight in the 22 June issue, it was calling both sides potent. "Life" was referred to as a pulsating rocker while "M'Lady" was likened to "Dance to the Music".

In the Soul Sauce section of Billboard in the magazine's 13 July issue, it was noted that Arthur Discotheque deejay, Jerry King said that the flip-side to "Life", "M'Lady" was a winner at the club.

According to Record World in the magazine's 17 August issue, the group's current hit "M'Lady" was the follow up to the previous hit "Dance to the Music", which had brought them overwhelming success.

"M'Lady" received a positive review in the 21 September issue of UK magazine Record Mirror. It was referred to as having a sudden eruption of power. The female voice powering away was referred to as great. The power of the brass was mentioned as well as the persistent beat. The reviewer said that if one were to say that it went on a bit, it didn't retract from the excitement. It was also called a chart certainty.

In the UK, Penny Valentine of Disc and Music Echo reviewed the song in the magazine's 21 September issue. She said that after listening to "M'Lady" a few times, she had come to the conclusion that Sly & the Family Stone were a sound. She said that the song had the funniest opening that she had ever heard. She also said that the lyrics on the song were practically nonexistent. She made other comments about the band when coming up for air the lyrics wander all over the place, and loads of unhealthy sounding brass etc. She was possibly referring to the tone arm of the record player in that she expected it to come off the record player due to the thumping and vigor. She said that it was a fantastic dance record, and it would win over anyone's ear drums.

== Charts ==
=== Cash Box ===
For the week of 27 July 1968 "M'Lady" debuted at no. 16 in the Cash Box Looking Ahead chart, and at no. 50 in the Cash Box Top 50 In R&B Locations chart. For the week of 10 August, "M'Lady" was at no. 7 in the Looking Ahead chart, and at no. 43 in the Top 50 In R&B Locations chart. The following week (17 August), the single debuted at no. 93 in the Cash Box Top 100 chart. It had also reached its peak position of no. 41 in the Cash Box Top 50 in R&B Locations chart. By the week of 31 August, "M'Lady" reached the no. 90 position in the Cash Box Top 100 chart.

=== Record World ===
For the week of 10 August, "M'Lady" entered the Record World Singles Coming Up Chart at no. 14. It spent one more week in the chart at no. 12 before debuting in the Record World 100 Top Pops chart at no. 99 for the week of 24 August. It spent a total of three weeks at that position. Its last charting week was on 7 September.

=== Billboard ===
For the week of 10 August, "M'Lady" debuted at no. 97 in the Billboard Hot 100 chart. It peaked at no. 93 on the week of 24 August and spent a total of three weeks in the chart.

=== RPM Weekly (Canada) ===
"M'Lady" made its debut at no. 90 in Canada's RPM 100 chart for the week of 2 September. It peaked at no. 89 the following week which was its final chart entry.

=== Record Mirror (UK) ===
The single debuted in the Record Mirror Britain's Top R&B singles at no. 15 and the Britain's Top 50 chart at no. 49 for the week of 5 October.
