= Al and the Transamericans =

American rock band

- Origin: New Hartford, NY, United States
- Genres: Rock, Americana, folk rock
- Years active: 1999–2004, 2006–present
- Labels: Fatboy Records; Basemental Records
- Members: Al Schnier; Vinnie Amico; Erik Glocker; Kirk Juhas; Gordon Stone; Diane Schnier
- Past members: Jim Loughlin; Ted Marotta; Rolf Witt
- Website: http://www.alschnier.com http://www.basementalrecords.com

Al and the Transamericans is a side project band formed by guitarist Al Schnier of moe. The band is a roots rock, alt country, Americana group. All of its musicians are members of other bands (moe., Strangefolk, Okemah, and the Gordon Stone Trio).

== History ==
The band was started as a side project by Schnier in January 1999. They played four shows that month in the Northeastern United States, with their first show being at the Pontiac Grill in Philadelphia. The first incarnation of the band included Schnier on guitar and vocals; Kirk Juhas of Free Beer & Chicken on keyboard, banjo, harmonica, and vocals; Jim Loughlin of Yolk on bass and vocals; Ted Marotta of Ominous Sea Pods on drums and vocals; and Rolf Witt of the Merry Danksters and Sonic Garden on mandolin, fiddle, and guitar.

They did not perform again until March 2000, when they played three shows in the Northeast. Vinnie Amico of moe. replaced Marotta on drums. In June 2000, the band played three more shows across Upstate New York (Buffalo, Utica, Albany). The last show, in Albany, included a guest appearance by Marotta on drums. Their final show of 2000 was played at the first annual moe.down festival in Turin, New York. The festival was hosted by Schnier's band moe. over Labor Day weekend. Marotta once again made a guest appearance during this performance.

Over a year later, they made their next appearance playing a moe. aftershow. The show, at the Lion's Den in New York City on Thanksgiving weekend, featured the same lineup without Rolf Witt. In 2002, they played BerkFest, moe.down, and two other shows in the Northeast.

The band's most active year was 2003, where they played over twenty shows throughout the year. During this time, the band's lineup was augmented; Schnier, Juhas, and Amico remained, while Gordon Stone took over for Witt on banjo and pedal steel, and Erik Glockler from Strangefolk took over on bass for Loughlin. Schnier's wife, Diane, also provided vocals on occasion. After moe.down IV, the band performed a series of shows in the Northeast in September and December. The tour was in support of their first album Analog, which was released on September 9, 2003.

In late March 2004, the band did a seven-show tour that started in Austin, Texas, and went through Alabama, Georgia, Tennessee, and Kentucky. Eventually the tour made its way north and ended in Hoboken, New Jersey. In late May, they played four more shows in the Northeast. They finished the year with a performance at moe.down V. During this show, Jay Barady of Woodenspoon replaced Gordon Stone on mandolin. This performance also featured three songs written by Diane Schnier, who also played keyboards and drums. These songs later appeared on her first album Before Cowboys.

The band did not perform in 2005, but Al Schnier, Juhas, and Marotta along with Diane Schnier, Kenny Juhas, and Shannon Lynch performed as Before Cowboys. The band performed songs written by Diane Schnier at three separate shows throughout the year, including a set at moe.down VI. On July 15, 2006, they played at the Electric Company in Utica, New York.

The Transamericans and Before Cowboys appeared together on May 11, 2007, at the Electric Company in Utica. Later that month the Transamericans played at another moe. festival, Summer Camp in Chillicothe, Illinois, over Memorial Day weekend. A return to the Electric Company for a moe. aftershow in July was followed by two Northeast dates in mid-August. Their last show of the year was a set at moe.down VIII.

On October 31, 2008, Basemental Records officially released the band's second studio album This Day & Age. The new album featured five new songs and was released as a limited edition series with only 1000 copies. Each copy was signed and numbered by Al Schnier. The album features the most frequent incarnation of the band: Al Schnier, Vinnie Amico, Erik Glockler, Kirk Juhas, and Gordon Stone. The band started a tour to support the new album with a release party on Halloween night at the Electric Company in Utica. The tour consisted of dates in the Northeast and lasted until midway through November.

== Discography ==
- 2003 – Analog – Fatboy Records/Basemental
- 2008 – This Day & Age – Basemental Records

== See also ==
- moe.
- Strangefolk
