= The Echo Project =

- Genre: Jam bands, Alternative rock, Hip hop, jazz, americana, bluegrass, country, folk, gospel, reggae, electronic
- Dates: October
- Locations: Fairburn, Georgia, US
- Years active: 2007
- Founders: Nicolas Bouckaert
- Website: Former official website, now defunct

The Echo Project was a three-day music festival held from October 12–14, 2007 in Fairburn, GA. The event was founded by Nicolas Bouckaert and held on 350+ acres of Bouckaert Farm along the Chattahoochee River. The main attractions of the festival were the multiple stages of live music, many artist venues, community building, and environmental awareness. The main stages were the Echo Stage, Lunar Stage, Eclipse Stage, Solar Stage, and the 99x Pontiac Green Garage.

== Highlights ==
The festival included many environment-friendly practices including recycling containers, the use of corn-based plastic drink cups, various uses of solar energy, the purchase of renewable energy to offset emissions generated from the use of electricity at the festival and other activities including work exchange programs and donating a portion of proceeds to Trees For The Future. Visitors to the festival were also given the option to purchase a green ticket which carried with it 500 kWh of renewable energy to offset the environmental impact of approximately 682 pounds of CO_{2}.

About 15,000 tickets were purchased for the event.

== Lineup ==
Notable appearances at the festival included:

- The Killers
- Phil Lesh & Friends
- The Flaming Lips
- Thievery Corporation
- Common
- Moe.
- The Album Leaf
- The Roots
- Spoon
- Cypress Hill
- Les Claypool
- Michael Franti & Spearhead
- Clap Your Hands Say Yeah
- Umphrey's McGee
- Disco Biscuits
- Stephen Marley
- Rabbit in the Moon
- GZA featuring Slick Rick
- The Bravery
- Medeski Martin & Wood
- MSTRKRFT
- Cat Power & Dirty Delta Blues
- Polyphonic Spree
- The Avett Brothers
- Butch Walker
