= Dither (album) =

Studio album by moe.
- Released: February 6, 2001
- Recorded: 1999–2000
- Genre: Rock
- Length: 1:12:58
- Label: Fatboy Records
- Producer: moe. & Jon Siket

Moe. chronology
L Version 3.1 (2000)	Dither (2001)	Warts and All: Volume 1 (2001)

Dither is the fifth studio album by the American rock band moe. It was released on February 6, 2001, on the band's new, self-owned label Fatboy Records. It was their first album after their split with former label Sony BMG. It was recorded in several studios around the country, from the summer of 1999 through the summer of 2000. The album features guest appearances by DJ Logic, Kirk Juhas, and the Nykw-ILL bros.

== Reception ==
Professional ratings
Review scores
Source	Rating
Allmusic	2.5/5 stars
Rolling Stone	4/5 stars

Rolling Stone magazine noted that most of the songs are "airtight groove-adelia, compact essays in twin-guitar sunshine and boyish-vocal cheer" and that the album is "muscular guitar pop with room for rambling." The Jambands.com review also says the song placement was "usually complementary, although [occasionally cluttered]" but noted that "when everything falls into place ... the disc is captivating"; Allmusic was more critical of the structure, however. Still, Rolling Stone mentions that the band is a "few years and LPs away from" the transcendence that the Grateful Dead, The Allman Brothers Band, and Cream were able to attain. Jambands.com seemed a bit more optimistic, saying "moe.'s songwriting has pointed towards something more mature, beyond the frolicking rave-ups of musical youth."

== Track listing ==
1. "Captain America" (Derhak) - 3:42
2. "Faker" (Derhak) - 4:23
3. "Understand" (Schnier) - 4:18
4. "TGORM" ("The Ghost of Ralph's Mom")*(Derhak) - 3:36
5. "So Long" (Schnier) - 7:21
6. "New York City" (Derhak) - 3:27
7. "Can't Seem to Find" (Schnier) - 3:43
8. "Water" (Derhak) - 7:08
9. "Tambourine" (Derhak) - 2:17
10. "In a Big Country" (Big Country) - 3:36
11. "Rise" (Schnier) - 5:46
12. "Opium" (Derhak) - 6:02
  silence - 13:55
  "Captain America" [remix] (hidden track) - 3:41
- *"TGORM" is the abbreviation that moe. used to name the track on the album. While that stands for "The Ghost of Ralph's Mom" a few "music" sites have incorrectly changed the G to a SIX (and a ZERO instead of O) mislabeling the song as "T60RM" instead of the correct "TGORM" (iTunes, for instance).

== Personnel ==
moe.

- Vinnie Amico - drums
- Rob Derhak - bass, vocals
- Chuck Garvey - guitar (acoustic, electric), vocals
- Jim Loughlin - flute, percussion
- Al Schnier - guitar (acoustic, electric, 12 string), harmonica, piano, vocals, moog synthesizer

Personnel:

- Vinnie Balzano - drums
- Claudio Disefalo - performer
- DJ Logic - turntables
- Bill Emmons - engineer
- Jeff Jakubowski, Damian Shannon, John Shyloski - overdub assistants
- Kirk Juhas - Hammond synth
- Fred Kevorkian - mastering
- John Siket - producer, engineer, mixing
- Naomi Watanabe - assistant engineer

== Charts ==
Album - Billboard

Year	Chart	Position
2001	Billboard Heatseekers	29
2001	Billboard Top Independent Albums(U.S.)	17
