= Life (Sly and the Family Stone song) =

"Life / M'Lady"

Single by Sly and the Family Stone

from the album Life
- B-side: "M'Lady"
- Released: 1968
- Recorded: unknown
- Length: 2:58
- Label: Epic; 5-10353
- Songwriter: S. Stewart
- Producer: Stone Flower Productions

Sly and the Family Stone singles chronology
"Dance to the Music" (1967)	"Life / M'Lady" (1968)	"Everyday People" (1968)

"Life" is a song by Sly and the Family Stone. Released as a single from the album Life, it reached the lower regions of the Billboard Hot 100 in the US. It also charted on the RPM100 in Canada.

== Background ==
"Life" was the second single issued by the group in the United States. It was backed with "M'Lady" and released on Epic 10353 in 1968.

Music magazine Billboard had it as a Top 60 Spotlight in the June 22 issue. Calling both sides potent, "Life" was called a pulsating rocker while "M'Lady" was likened to "Dance to the Music".

"Life" was the first song on side two of the album Life, released in the United States on Epic BN 26397. "M'Lady" was the fourth song on side two.

In Ed Och's Soul Sauce column (Billboard magazine), it was announced that Sly & the Family Stone were to perform "Life" on Wednesday, June 19 at the Epic National Sales Convention in Las Vegas before their appearances for three days at Fillmore West.

== Charts ==
It debuted and peaked at No. 93 on the Billboard Hot 100 dated August 27, 1968, spending a total of three weeks on the chart.

In Canada, "Life" debuted at No. 90 on the RPM 100 chart for the week ending July 13, 1968, and peaked at No. 63 for the week ending August 3.
