= Fatboy (album) =

Studio album by Moe
- Released: September 21, 1999
- Recorded: 1991
- Label: Fatboy Records
- Producer: moe. Andrew Buscher

Moe chronology
Fatboy (1999)	Headseed (1994)

Professional ratings
Review scores
Source	Rating
Allmusic	3/5 stars

Fatboy was the first studio album by the jam band Moe. It was first released in 1992 as a cassette of which only 1,000 were released. The band re-released the album in September 1999 on CD.

== Recording ==
The album was recorded in the Spring of 1991 at Happy House Studios, the second floor of an apartment in Buffalo, NY, which was owned/operated by Andrew Buscher. Over ten evenings, the album was recorded and mixed. The band used sixteen track audio for the recording and used overdubs for vocals and solos.

The band's original drummer, Ray Schwartz, left the group between the tracking and mixing in order to attend graduate school in New Paltz, NY. Soon after the album was finished, the band took on Jim Loughlin as their new drummer.

"Yodelittle" was re-recorded for 1994's Headseed while an updated recording of "Spine Of A Dog" was featured on No Doy in 1996. Both songs would go on to become standards of the band's live-set rotation, along with "Y.O.Y".

== Track listing ==
1. "Y.O.Y." (Garvey) – 5:15
2. "Havah Nagilah -> Long Island Girls Rule"* (Derhak) – 4:54
3. "Dr. Graffenburg" (Derhak) – 5:25
4. "Don't Fuck with Flo" (Derhak) – 4:57
5. "Yodelittle" (Schnier) – 9:13
6. "Spine of a Dog" (Derhak, Garvey) – 5:00
7. "Sensory Deprivation Bank" (Derhak) – 4:51
8. "The Battle of Benny Hill" (moe.) – 1:52
- Havah Nagilah was listed as a separate track on the original release. Subsequent releases now only list "Long Island Girls Rule" as the second track.

== Personnel ==
Moe:

- Rob Derhak – bass, vocals
- Chuck Garvey – guitar, vocals
- Al Schnier – guitar, vocals
- Ray Schwartz – drums

Production:

- Andrew Buscher – producer, engineer
- Coulter Young – artwork
