= Headseed =

Studio album by Moe
- Released: October 1994
- Label: Fatboy Records

Moe chronology
Fatboy (1992)	Headseed (1994)	Loaf (1996)

Professional ratings
Review scores
Source	Rating
Allmusic	link

Headseed is the second studio release from the jam band Moe, released on their own label, Fatboy Records. This was the first album to feature Jim Loughlin, and the only one on which he is the drummer. A re-recording of "St. Augustine" would also appear on the band's 1996 major label debut, No Doy, while the version of "Yodelittle" heard here is a re-recording of a song from Fatboy, the band's 1992 debut. The majority of the songs on this album became standards of the band's live-set rotation and have seen frequent performances throughout the band's career.

In 1995, Moe unveiled a "rock opera" centered around the song, "Timmy Tucker". The opera features several exclusive pieces of music and narration as well as songs such as "Queen Of The Rodeo" and "Jazz Wank", which became well known in future stand-alone performances. Timmy has been performed in full on three known occasions, the last of which occurred in Providence RI on April 22, 2001.

== Track listing ==
1. "Akimbo" (Garvey) – 5:18
2. "Mexico" (Schnier) – 6:50
3. "Timmy Tucker" (Derhak) – 7:09
4. "St. Augustine" (Derhak) – 3:50
5. "Recreational Chemistry" (Schnier) – 6:49
6. "Time Again" (Schnier) – 3:42
7. "Yodelittle" (Schnier) – 8:25
8. "Brent Black" (Derhak) – 6:06
9. "Threw It All Away" (Schnier) – 4:21
10. "Time Ed" (Derhak) – 10:30

== Personnel ==
Moe

- Rob Derhak – bass, songwriter, vocals, producer, mixing
- Chuck Garvey – guitar, songwriter, vocals, producer, mixing
- Jim Loughlin – drums, vocals, producer, mixing
- Al Schnier – guitar, songwriter, vocals, producer, mixing

Production:

- Andrew Buscher – engineer, mixing
- Coulter Young – cover art
