= Tin Cans & Car Tires =

Tin Cans and Car Tires

Studio album by moe.
- Released: September 8, 1998
- Recorded: February – April 1998
- Length: 57:57
- Label: 550 Music
- Producer: moe. John Alagia

Moe. chronology
| No Doy (1996) | Tin Cans and Car Tires (1998) | moe. Sells Out (1998) |

Professional ratings
Review scores
| Source | Rating |
|---|---|
| AllMusic | 4/5 stars |

Tin Cans and Car Tires is an album by moe. It was released in 1998. It marked the recorded debut of drummer Vinnie Amico, who had taken over the position from Chris Mazur in 1996. Most of the material on the album had been included in the band's live sets for a number of years before being recorded for the album, including "Queen of the Rodeo", which first appeared in 1995 as part of the "rock opera" Timmy.

== Critical reception ==
The Washington Post thought that "there are still some examples of self-indulgence—opaque lyrics, overly fussy passages, odd time signatures for no good reason—but the album is dominated by eight songs where the conversational vocals, catchy melodies and Americana roots offer an accessible entry to the band's improvisatory dexterity."

== Track listing ==
1. "Stranger Than Fiction" (Derhak) — 3:02
2. "Spaz Medicine" (Schnier) — 5:06
3. "Nebraska" (Derhak) — 3:50
4. "Head" (Schnier) — 5:46
5. "Hi & Lo" (Garvey) — 4:29
6. "Plane Crash" (Derhak) — 8:54
7. "Letter Home" (Schnier) — 4:07
8. "Big World" (Schnier) — 4:49
9. "Again and Again" (Schnier) — 4:34
10. "It" (Garvey) — 5:04
11. "Happy Hour Hero" (Derhak) — 5:03
12. "Queen of the Rodeo" (Schnier) — 3:07

== Personnel ==
moe.:

- Rob Derhak - bass, Nepalese bells, acoustic guitar, vocals
- Chuck Garvey - lead guitar, rhythm guitar, acoustic guitar, vocals
- Al Schnier - lead guitar, lap steel, rhythm guitar, acoustic guitar, vocals
- Vinnie Amico - drums, percussion

Additional musicians:

- Jeffrey Pettit - alto saxophone on "Spaz Medecine"
- Andrew Bellavia - tenor saxophone on "Spaz Medecine"
- David Fitzhugh - flugelbone on "Spaz Medecine"
- Andrew Winn - Wurlitzer piano on "Nebraska"
- Lorenza Ponce - violins on "Plane Crash"
- Jane Scarpantoni - cellos on "Plane Crash"
- Steve Young - Hammond organ on "Plane Crash"
- J.C. Kuhl - saxophone on "Happy Hour Hero"
- John Carroll - piano & Hammond organ on "Happy Hour Hero"
- John Alagía - tambourine on "Queen of the Rodeo"

Production:

- John Alagía - producer
- Doug Derryberry, John Siket - engineer
- John Halpern - photography
- Rick Pohronezny - assistant engineer
- Steve Young - engineer
- Joel Zimmerman - art direction

== Charts ==
Album - Billboard

| Year | Chart | Position |
|---|---|---|
| 1998 | Billboard Heatseekers | 21 |
