= No Doy =

Studio album by moe.
- Released: October 15, 1996
- Genre: Rock; jam
- Length: 58:17
- Label: 550 Music
- Producer: moe.; John Porter

Moe. chronology
Loaf (1996)	No Doy (1996)	Tin Cans and Car Tires (1998)

Professional ratings
Review scores
Source	Rating
AllMusic	link
Rolling Stone	(mixed) link

No Doy is the first commercial release by the American jam band moe. through a major label, Sony Music Entertainment. "Spine of a Dog" is a re-recording of a song that originally appeared on the first moe. album, Fatboy (with an a cappella intro) and "St. Augustine" is a re-recording of the song from Headseed (with much more prominent slide guitar). Several of the songs on this album, including "Buster", "Rebubula", "Moth", and "32 Things" have gone on to become cornerstones of the band's live-set rotation.

== Track listing ==
1. "She Sends Me" (Schnier) – 3:56
2. "32 Things" (Schnier) – 6:26
3. "St. Augustine" (Derhak) – 3:44
4. "Bring You Down" (Schnier) – 3:49
5. "Rebubula" (Derhak) – 11:27
6. "Spine of a Dog" (Derhak, Garvey) – 3:48
7. "Moth" (Schnier) – 5:40
8. "Buster" (Derhak) – 8:34
9. "Four" (Garvey) – 10:50

== Personnel ==
moe.

- Rob Derhak – electric bass, vocals
- Chuck Garvey – guitar, vocals
- Chris Mazur – drums, vocals
- Al Schnier – guitar, vocals

Production

- Nadine Hemy – coordination
- Jesse Henderson – assistant engineer
- Joe McGrath – engineer, mixing
- Vladimir Meller – mastering
- Brendan O'Neil – engineer
- John Porter – producer, mixing
- Jim Porto – photography
- John Wells – cover model
- Kelly Wholford, Jen Wyler – assistant engineers
- Colin Young – illustrations
