= Wormwood (Moe album) =

Studio album by moe.
- Released: February 4, 2003
- Recorded: 2002
- Genre: Jam rock
- Length: 57:23
- Label: Fatboy Records
- Producer: moe.

Moe. chronology
Season's Greetings from moe. (2002)	Wormwood (2003)	Warts and All: Volume 3 (2003)

Professional ratings
Review scores
Source	Rating
Allmusic	4/5 stars
Jambands.com	favorable
Rolling Stone	3/5 stars

Wormwood is an album by Moe. It was released on February 4, 2003 by Fatboy Records.

Wormwood is considered an interesting album for the way it was recorded. The band took live recordings of their new songs from various Summer 2002 shows onward and interlaced them with studio takes. For this reason, there are sometimes cheers of the crowd evident (such as during the beginning of "Bullet"). Additionally, the album can be viewed as one seamless track, with the instrumental tracks bridging the gaps (segues) into the next.

It was a 2004 Jammy Award winner as the 'best studio album'.

== Track listing ==
1. "Not Coming Down" (Schnier) – 3:55
2. "Wormwood" (moe.) – 4:48
3. "Okayalright" (Derhak) – 4:12
4. "Rumble Strip" (moe.) – 1:12
5. "Gone" (lyrics: Schnier, Derhak; music: Schnier) – 5:27
6. "Organs" (Schnier) – 0:49
7. "Crab Eyes" (lyrics: Derhak, Garvey, Schnier; music: moe.) – 5:04
8. "Bullet" (lyrics: Garvey; music: moe.) – 7:45
9. "Kyle's Song" (moe.) – 7:54
10. "Bend Sinister" (moe.) – 2:38
11. "Kids" (lyrics: Schnier; music: moe.) – 6:45
12. "Kidstoys" (lyrics: B. Schnier, E. Derhak; music: moe.) – 1:17
13. "Shoot First" (Garvey) – 4:03
14. "Edison Laugh Record" (moe.) – 1:35

== Personnel ==
moe.:

Vinnie Amico: percussion, drums
Rob Derhak: bass, vocals, photography
Chuck Garvey: guitar, piano, vocals, photography
Jim Loughlin: percussion, mallets, piccolo bass, MIDI mallets
Al Schnier: guitar, keyboards, vocals, editing, drum loop

Becca Childs Derhak: art direction, cover design
Scott Elmquist: photography
Bill Emmons: engineer, mixing
Fred Kevorkian: mastering
Mike Lapierre: assistant engineer
