= Direction Records (British label) =

Defunct British record label

- Status: Defunct
- Genre: American soul and R&B

The Direction record label was a subsidiary label established by CBS Records in the UK in spring 1967. It primarily released American soul and R&B recordings in the UK, but also issued records by British and Jamaican artists, the former including Elmer Gantry's Velvet Opera. Among its most successful releases were those by Sly & the Family Stone, The Bandwagon, who both scored Top 10 hits in summer and autumn 1968, Taj Mahal, and The Chambers Brothers. It was discontinued in 1970, though briefly revived in 1980 for three singles by The Step and a 4-track EP by Noel McCalla.
