= Vinnie Amico =

American drummer

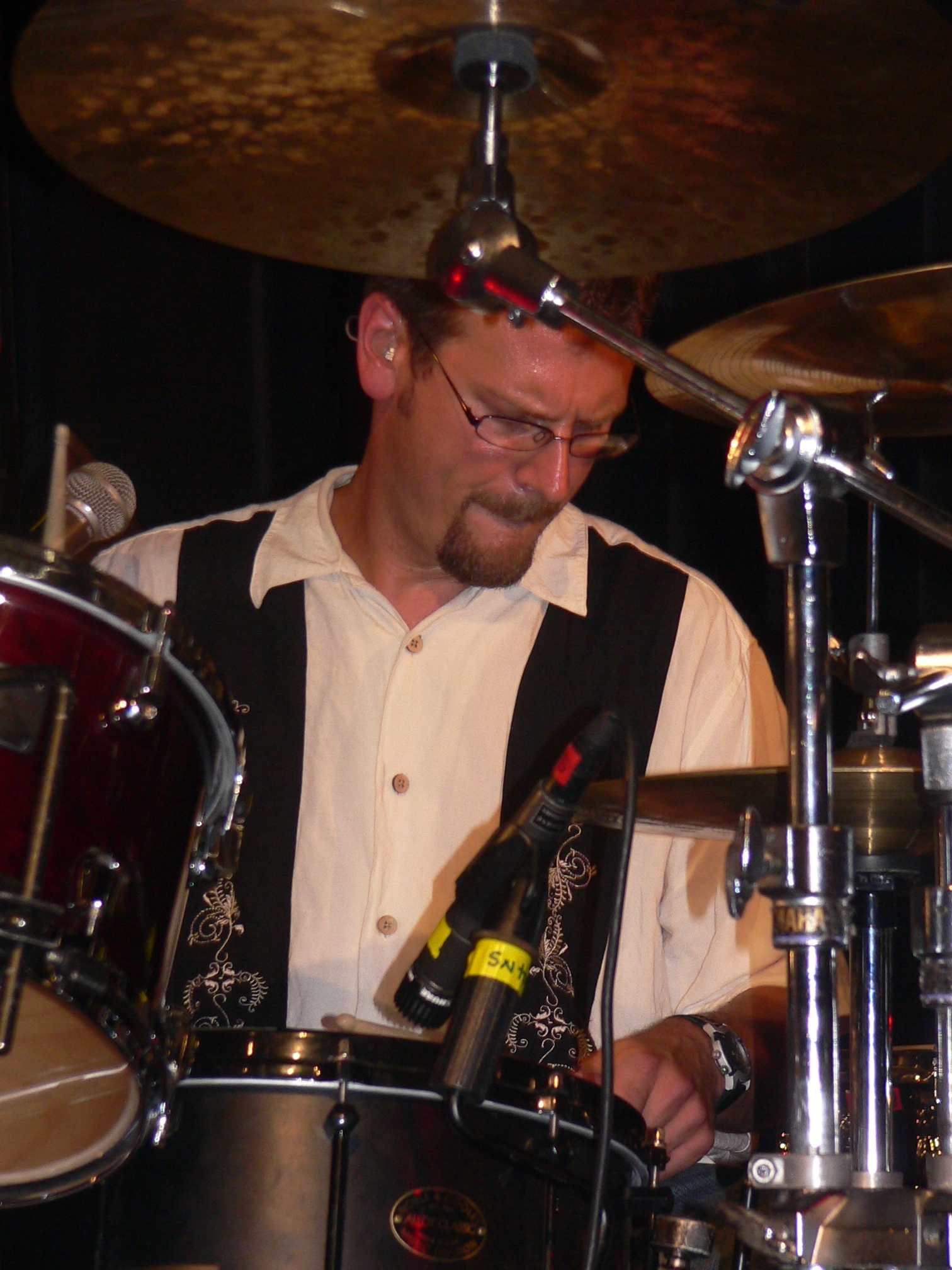

Background information
- Origin: Niskayuna, NY
- Genres: Progressive rock rock music folk rock electronica
- Occupation: musician
- Instrument: Drums
- Years active: 1996 - present
- Label: Fatboy Records
- Member of: moe. Al and the Transamericans
- Website: http://www.moe.org/vinnie

Vinnie Amico is a drummer and member of the American jamband moe.

== History ==
Amico joined moe as part of the permanent lineup after Chris Mazur left the band in November 1996. Amico attended State University of New York at Buffalo where he played in various local bands including Grateful Dead cover band Sonic Garden, Acoustic Forum, and Outer Circle Orchestra.

== Equipment ==
Amico uses Mapex, Vic Firth, Paiste, and Evans drum equipment.

Sonic Garden
