= Moe (band) =

American psychedelic rock jam band

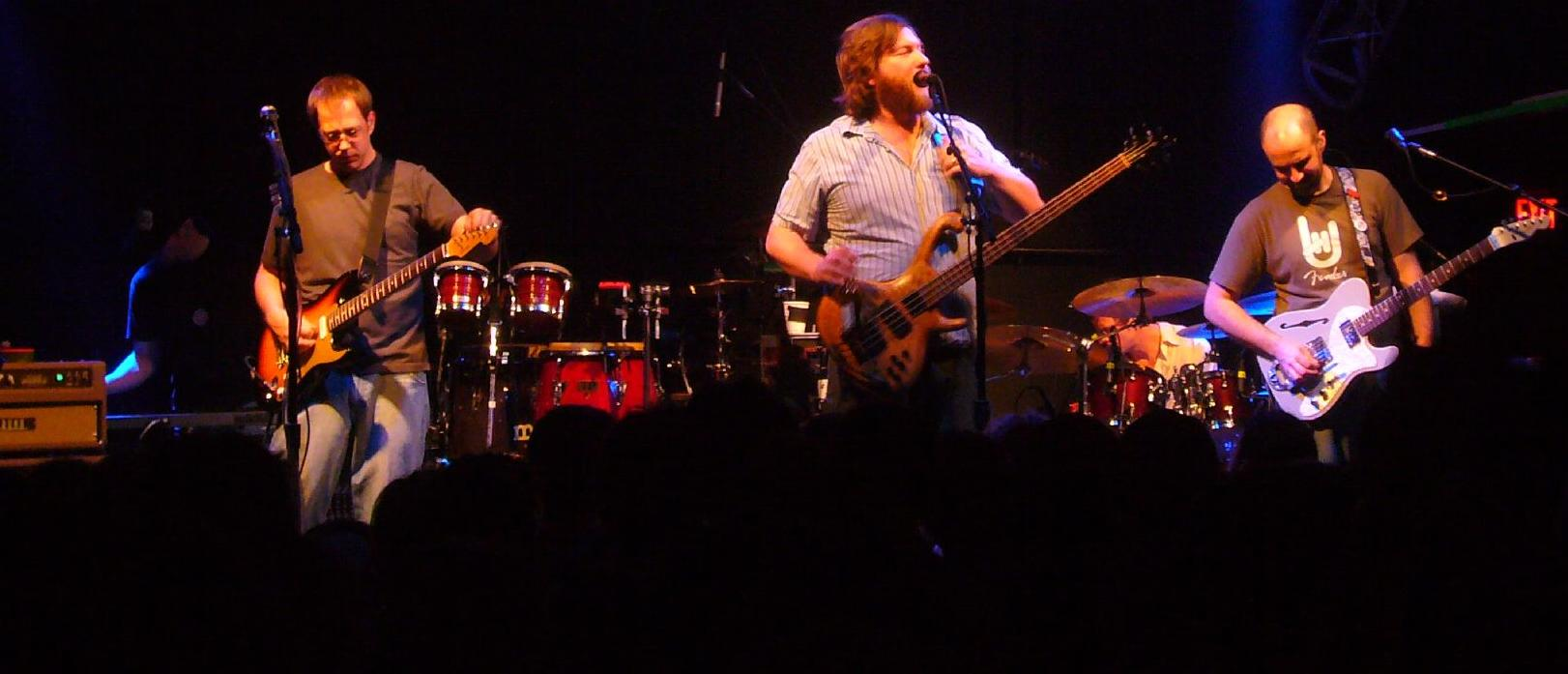
- Moe tuning their instruments between songs on March 3, 2007. Left to right: Jim Loughlin, Chuck Garvey, Rob Derhak, Vinnie Amico, Al Schnier.

Background information
- Origin: Buffalo, New York, U.S.
- Genres: Rock; progressive rock; neo-psychedelia; jam band
- Years active: 1990–present
- Label: Fatboy
- Members: Rob Derhak; Chuck Garvey; Al Schnier; Jim Loughlin; Vinnie Amico; Nate Wilson
- Past members: Ray Schwartz; Dave Kessler; Steve Hunter; Mike Strazza; Chris Mazur; Suke Cerulo
- Website: www.moe.org

Moe (stylized as moe.) is an American rock jam band, formed at the University at Buffalo in 1989. The band members are Rob Derhak (bass, vocals), Al Schnier (guitar, vocals, keyboard), Chuck Garvey (guitar, vocals), Vinnie Amico (drums), Jim Loughlin (percussion) and Nate Wilson (keyboard).

The band's first record, Fatboy (1992), established the band as a favorite of the 1990s jam band and improvisational rock scene, which grew in popularity with the rise of bands such as Phish and Widespread Panic.

Moe toured with the Furthur Festival in 1997, appeared at Woodstock '99, played Summerstage at the Rumsey Playfield in Central Park, opened for The Allman Brothers and The Who, performed at Radio City Music Hall on New Year's Eve 2006 and returned there for New Year's Eve 2007. They have also performed at Bonnaroo Music Festival five times (2002, 2003, 2004, 2006, and 2009).

== History ==
The origin of the band goes back as far as October 1989, when Chuck Garvey, Rob Derhak, and Ray Schwartz got together to play a Halloween show at a friend's behest. The band's first true form began in the winter of 1990. Chuck was joined by Dave Kessler on guitar and Steve Hunter joined on saxophone and vocals. They called themselves "Five Guys named Moe," the name of a Louis Jordan song. They opened for a band named Monkey Wrench at Broadway Joe's in Buffalo, New York. Monkey Wrench would later be mentioned in Moe's song "Y.O.Y.," where Garvey sings "I wish I could suck like Monkey Wrench."

In the fall of 1990, Hunter exited. Also, the band's name evolved first into "Haggis" (for one week) before settling to be simply "Moe", noticeably without the period. Derhak pushed for the "m" to be capitalized, but a Brooklyn band had that name already.

Al Schnier sat in with the band for a show in 1991 in Buffalo when Kessler was absent. After this show, Schnier was a frequent guest. They became known as the moe guitar army because of the three guitarists. It was around this time that the band also officially adopted the period at the end of its name. Schnier joined Moe full-time in early 1992 and in the spring, Kessler left due to a lack of interest.

After recording a series of cassette-only releases in 1991, all of which are impossible to find, in June 1992, the band recorded Fatboy, after which Schwartz left the band to go to graduate school. Jim Loughlin joined Moe in September, on drums. During the summer of 1993, Chuck quit the band due to personal issues, but returned two months later and "begged for re-admittance and more abuse."

In the spring of 1994, Moe recorded Headseed, officially quitting their day jobs, and they all moved to Albany, New York. Loughlin left in June 1995 to pursue a band named Yolk, from Binghamton, New York. After Loughlin left, Mike Strazza joined on drums, but only from July until the end of 1995, though he officially quit in September. During their two nights over Thanksgiving weekend at the Wetlands in New York City, Moe recorded Loaf, their first official live release, on which Strazza appears. Chris Mazur joined the band on drums from late 1995 through November 1996, and appeared on the album, No Doy.

On November 21, 1996, at The Bayou, in Washington D.C., Vinnie Amico made his debut behind the drumkit and has continued in that position ever since. In 1998, the band really hit their stride as a four-piece, playing nearly 100 shows and recording their fourth album, Tin Cans And Car Tires. In early 1999, Jim Loughlin returned to the lineup on percussion, vibraphone, xylophone, flute, backup bass, acoustic guitar, vocals, and washboard. Since January 23, 1999, the band Moe has officially been Al Schnier, Chuck Garvey, Rob Derhak, Vinnie Amico, and Jim Loughlin.

Signing with Sony/550 Music, Moe released their third album, No Doy in 1996, and 1998 saw the release of Tin Cans And Car Tires, which featured Vinnie Amico's first recordings with the band. Upon leaving Sony in 2000, Moe revived Fatboy Records and issued its second live album, L. In 2001, Moe launched the Warts & All series of complete live performances, released as multi-CD sets. Six such volumes were released between 2001-2008, on Fatboy Records, before the series was retitled Dr. Stan's Prescription, for two further volumes.

2001 also saw the release of Dither, which featured several road-tested originals as well as a cover of "In a Big Country", by Scottish rockers Big Country, while 2002 brought forth the Christmas album, Season's Greetings from Moe, featuring two original seasonal songs as well as several holiday standards.

For 2003's Wormwood and 2007's The Conch Moe utilized several live recordings of new songs as the foundation for studio experimentation, with the results mimicking the band's freewheeling live performances. The ninth Moe album, 2008's Sticks & Stones, focused primarily on material that had never been performed live, a first for the band. Moe released their first "best-of" in 2010, Smash Hits Volume One, which features re-recordings of songs from the Sony era, as well as tracks from their more recent albums. 2012 found Moe inking a deal with Sugar Hill Records and releasing their tenth album, What Happened To The La Las, while No Guts No Glory followed in 2014.

Moe announced an indefinite hiatus beginning August 1, 2017, while bassist Rob Derhak underwent treatment for oropharyngeal cancer. Derhak was declared cancer-free in December 2017 which coincided with Moe announcing a 2018 return to live performance.

Moe returned to the stage, at the Capitol Theatre in Port Chester, New York, on February 2, 2018, and have since resumed a regular touring schedule. Schnier has said that Derhak has brought a new perspective to the band in light of his life-threatening illness since his return.

== Fundraising ==
The band has taken part in a number of fundraising efforts. Moe held a tsunami benefit concert at the Roseland Ballroom in New York City on February 10, 2005. Sharing the stage were Sam Bush; John Medeski of Medeski, Martin, and Wood; Trey Anastasio; and Anastasio collaborator Jennifer Hartswick. All proceeds from the event were matched by the Dave Matthews Band and his Bama Works Village Recovery Fund to assist rebuilding an east coast sea town in Sri Lanka. Bama Works, Dave's philanthropic brainchild, recorded a final tally of $155,000. The performance garnered Moe an award for Live Performance of the Year at the 6th Annual Jammy Awards.

On January 22, 2006, Moe performed at the Landmark Theatre in Syracuse, New York. This concert raised $35,000 in support of the Kelberman Center, a comprehensive community resource for individuals with autism spectrum disorder and their families. The evenings proceeds brought Moe's charitable contributions to over $200,000 between January 2005 and January 2006. Al Schnier said about the Kelberman Center:

The Promise School is one of the leading resources for autistic preschoolers in the country. I was amazed, and grateful, to learn that one of the most highly regarded programs was right here in our community. As we learn more about autism, and as our kids grow older, we are finding that we as parents and our children need that same high quality and progressive resource beyond the Promise Program's objective. The Kelberman Center is fulfilling that need.

On April 11, 2006, Moe donated $38,000 to the Kelberman Center as part of The Face of Autism telethon.

On January 22, 2010, Moe held another benefit concert at Roseland Ballroom in New York, raising funds for WHY (World Hunger Year). This show was also their first of 2010, and of the tour. Guests included Danny Barnes (banjo), Marco Benevento (keyboards), Jeff Austin (mandolin), Butch Trucks (drums), and David Sanborn (saxophone).

== Festivals ==
=== Moe.lennium ===
Moe rang in the new millennium with three nights at The Chance in Poughkeepsie, New York, December 29–31, 1999.

=== Moe. or Les ===
Moe hosted a festival in 2002 with 2 nights at Marvin's Magical Mountaintop in Masontown, West Virginia, alongside Colonel Les Claypool's Fearless Flying Frog Brigade. Friday and Saturday nights featured 1 set of moe., 1 set of the frog brigade, then another set of moe. This festival was the first festival held at Marvin's Magical Mountaintop, to which bassist Rob Derhak noted, and mentioned they ought to make a return. Later that year, it was announced All Good festival would call Marvin's Magical Mountaintop its annual home starting in 2003, with moe. being the featured headliner for many of the 2000s era All Goods.

=== moe.down ===
Moe.down
- Genre: Jam band music
- Location: Turin, New York
- Years active: 2000-present
- Founders: Moe

Moe hosts the semi annual festival "moe.down" at Snow Ridge Ski Area in Turin, New York. Started in 2000, the festival runs for three days and occurs every Labor Day weekend. In 2017 and 2019 the festival occurred during the Fourth of July holiday. The festival has attracted a wide variety of musical talent. Acts range from newer bands just emerging onto the scene (such as Tea Leaf Green, Nellie McKay and Raq) to big-name acts and jam rock staples, such as Les Claypool, Blues Traveler, and Mike Gordon (of Phish), to pop rock icons such as Leo Kottke, The Flaming Lips, The Violent Femmes, and Perry Farrell. Each year, the amount of Moe.down attendees has steadily increased: The first Moe.down drew around 3,000 people while Moe.down VI in 2005 had close to 7,000, and 12,000 at Moedown 9.

After ten years in Turin, moe.down moved to the Gelston Castle Estate in Mohawk, New York, for two years. In 2012, the event moved back to Turin, with the dates changing to August 10–12. On January 19, 2015, Moe announced that after 15 years moe.down would be postponed indefinitely.

In 2017, the band announced the return of moe.down, pared down into a less-bloated, "return to roots" format.

On April 3, 2019, Moe announced the lineup for their 2019 moe.down running July 4–6 at the Snow Ridge Ski Resort in Turin, New York.

=== Snoe.down ===
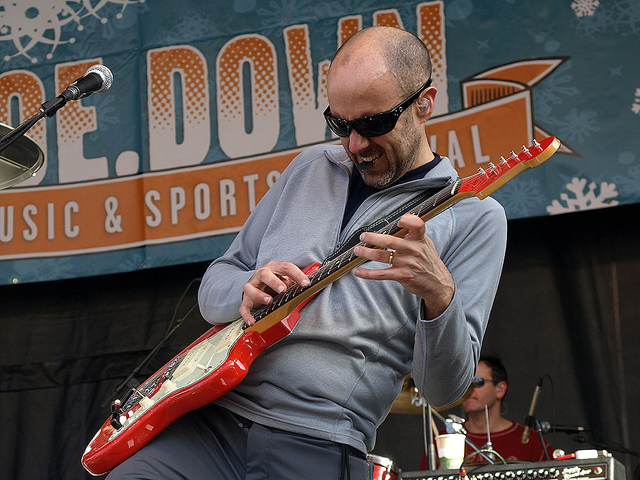
Al Schnier of Moe playing guitar at snoe.down 2010

Moe hosted snoe.down II March 17, 2006 through March 19, 2006. This event, which kicked off the week-long Adirondack Almost Springfest celebration, took place at the Olympic Center in Lake Placid, New York, and at nearby Whiteface. During the concerts (though not during Moe's sets) fans had the option of ice skating while listening to the show. Bands included Soulive, Everyone Orchestra, Assembly of Dust, and Tea Leaf Green. Chuck said about snoe.down II:

Our set outdoors (that's right, outdoors on a ski slope in 10 – 15 degree weather) was brisk and inspired by hot coffee and a touch of whiskey. The gloves that I cut up to "protect" my hands from the cold ended up looking like something from Pat Benatar's 1980s video wardrobe when I was done making field alterations onstage to accommodate playing with my slide ... ... .hmmmmm. A bad sign, usually, but a crowd of 2,000+ made it their business not to budge the whole time. Kudos all around! Completely worth it – especially if you get to ski right up to your workplace!!

=== Moe cruise ===
From March 7, 2004 until March 14, 2004, Moe embarked on their first musical cruise aboard the Norwegian Sun through Les and Lynn Berger of Rhythms at Sea Cruises (formerly Rock the Boat Cruises). Setting out from Miami, the Norwegian Sun visited Jamaica, The Cayman Islands, Costa Maya, and Cozumel before returning to Florida. The band performed each day except for the 12th, on the pool deck, Stardust Lounge, and the Observation Lounge. The shows on the 10th in the Observation Lounge were acoustic sets featuring questions and answer sessions with the band.

In January 2007, the band returned for its second cruise, again through Les and Lynn Berger of Rhythms at Sea Cruises. The cruise took place January 7, 2007 through January 14, 2007 on the Norwegian Jewel. Fans were treated to a different itinerary this time: the ship headed east out of Miami and hit the ports of San Juan (Puerto Rico), St. John's (Antigua), and St. Thomas (US Virgin Islands). Unfortunately due to rough seas, the ship did not port at the Great Stirrup Cay (Bahamas).

=== Other festivals ===
Moe has also played at a number of established festivals, including;

- High Sierra Music Festival, Quincy, CA (2001, 2013)
- The New Orleans Jazz and Heritage Festival, New Orleans, LA (2002, 2014)
- Bonnaroo, Manchester, TN (2002, 2003, 2004, 2006, 2009)
- Vegoose Festival, Las Vegas, NV (2005, 2007)
- Summer Camp Music Festival, Chillicothe, IL (2001–2017)
- Woodstock 1999, Rome, NY
- Beale Street Music Festival, Memphis, TN (1999, 2002)
- Summerfest, Milwaukee, WI (2001, 2002, 2004, 2006)
- Nateva Music & Camping Festival, Oxford, ME (2010)
- Langerado Music Festival, Ft. Lauderdale, FL (2004, 2007)
- Riverbend Festival, Chattanooga, TN (2007)
- All Good Music Festival, Masontown, WV (2007, 2009, 2011)
- The Echo Project, Fairburn, GA (2007)
- 10,000 Lakes Festival, Detroit Lakes, MN (2003, 2007)
- Lollapalooza, Chicago, IL (2007)
- Diversafest, Tulsa, Ok (2008)
- Mile High Music Festival, Commerce City, CO (July 2008)
- Dunegrass and Blues Festival, Empire, MI (August 2008)
- Wanee Music Festival, Live Oak, Fl (April 2008, 2014)
- Gathering of the Vibes, Plattsburgh, NY (1998); Bridgeport, CT (1999, 2000, 2009, 2011, 2014)
- Bear Creek, Live Oak, FL (November 2010)
- Magnolia Fest, Live Oak, FL (October 2011)
- Jam Cruise 11, Ft. Lauderdale, FL (January 2012)
- Jam In The Dam, Amsterdam, Netherlands (March 2012)
- Hangout Fest, Gulf Shores, AL (May 2013)
- Body Jam, Baltimore, MD (January 2014)
- Southern Brewers Festival, Chattanooga, TN (August 2014)
- Peach Festival, Scranton, PA (August 2016)
- Mustang Music Festival, Corolla, NC (October 2016)
- Lockn', Arrington, VA
- (August 2018 (Phil.moe.), 2019 (scheduled))

They received a Jammy for their Bonnaroo performance on June 22, 2002.

== Band members ==
=== Current members ===
- Rob Derhak – bass, vocals (October 1989 – present)
- Chuck Garvey – guitar, vocals (October 1989 – present; hiatus due to stroke November 2021 – December 2022)
- Al Schnier – guitar, keyboards, vocals, mandolin (1991 (guest); January 1992 – present)
- Vinnie Amico – drums (November 21, 1996 – present)
- Jim Loughlin – drums (September 1992 – July 15, 1995); percussion, MalletKat, flute, acoustic guitar, drums, piccolo bass, washboard, etc. (January 23, 1999 – present)
- Nate Wilson – keyboards, flute, vocals (December 2021 – December 2022 (touring only); January 2023 – present)

=== Former members ===
- Ray Schwartz – drums (October 1989 – summer 1992)
- Dave Kessler – guitar (winter 1990 – spring 1992)
- Steve Hunter – saxophone, vocals (fall 1990 – winter 1990)
- Mike Strazza – drums (July 22, 1995 – December 9, 1995)
- Chris Mazur – drums (December 29, 1995 – November 17, 1996)
- Suke Cerulo – guitar (December 2021 – January 2023 (touring only))

== Discography ==
=== Studio albums ===
- 1992: Fatboy – independent release (re-released 1999, Fatboy Records)
- 1994: Headseed – Fatboy Records
- 1996: No Doy – 550 Music
- 1998: Tin Cans and Car Tires – 550 Music
- 2001: Dither – Fatboy Records
- 2002: Season's Greetings from Moe – Fatboy Records
- 2003: Wormwood – Fatboy Records
- 2007: The Conch – Fatboy Records
- 2008: Sticks and Stones – Fatboy Records
- 2012: What Happened to the La Las – Sugar Hill Records
- 2014: No Guts, No Glory – Sugar Hill Records
- 2020: This Is Not, We Are – Fatboy Records
- 2020: Not Normal (EP) – Fatboy Records
- 2025: Circle of Giants - Fatboy Records

=== Live albums ===
- 2000: L – Fatboy Records
- 2000: L Version 3.1 – Fatboy Records
- 2001: Warts and All: Volume 1 – Fatboy Records
- 2002: Warts and All: Volume 2 – Fatboy Records
- 2003: Warts and All: Volume 3 – Fatboy Records
- 2005: Warts and All: Volume 4 – Fatboy Records
- 2007: Warts and All: Volume 5 – Fatboy Records
- 2008: Warts and All: Volume 6 – Fatboy Records
- 2008: Dr. Stan's Prescription, Volume 1 – Fatboy Records
- 2009: Dr. Stan's Prescription, Volume 2 – Fatboy Records

=== Compilation albums ===
- 2010: Smash Hits Volume 1 – Fatboy Records

=== Promotional releases ===
- 1996: meat. – 550 Music
  - Out of print. 10,000 made. The song clocks in at a little over 45 minutes. The liner notes said, "Lyric by Al Schnier."
- 1998: Moe Sells Out – 550 Music
- 2007: High and Congress – Fatboy Records

=== Limited edition releases ===
- 1991: Codename: Weasleshark – independent cassette release
- 1991: Spine Of A Dog – independent cassette release
- 1991: Real Live, Nearly Free – independent cassette release
- 1996: Loaf – Fatboy Records
- 2005: okayalright – Yellow Bus Records (item LBCY-403) - Japanese import

=== Live material (official releases) downloads ===
- 2018: Wicked Awesome Vol. 1 – nugs.net download
- 2019: Wicked Awesome Vol. 2 – nugs.net download
- 2020: Wicked Awesome Vol. 3 – nugs.net download
- 2021: Live From Telefunken Soundstage

=== Video and DVD releases ===
- 2006: Moe: Live at the Fillmore – DVD – Fatboy Records

== Notable Tours ==
=== Summer 2025 ===
June 18–19, 2025 - The Pour House Charleston, SC - TIME moe.CHINE - moe. Jams the 90's

- June 18, 2025 - Set 1: Havah Negilah, Long Island Girls Rule, Threw It All Away, Y.O.Y.*, Time Again, Seat Of My Pants, Sensory Deprivation Bank, Take The Skinheads Bowling Set 2: Spine Of A Dog, Buster, No Rain, Johnny Lineup, Defrost, Yodelittle, Meat Encore: Don't Fuck With Flo - Notes: * 1st Chuck sang YOY since the stroke.
- June 19, 2025 - Set 1: Bring You Down, Brent Black, She Sends Me, Nebraska, Me and Pat and Bill and You, Four, Dr. Graffenberg, Immigrant Song* Set 2: Fire1*, Happy Hour Hero, Recreational Chemistry, Rebubula, Spaz Medicine, Rebubula Encore: Queen Of The Rodeo, Stranger Than Fiction - Notes: * With Kanika Moore on vocals.
- Jam Base Article: Dream Setlists: moe. Revives Lost Classics Galore At TIME moe.CHINE Run In Charleston

== Audio ==
- Akimbo – from a live concert on November 5, 2004 at the Tower Theater in Upper Darby Township, Pennsylvania.

== See also ==
- List of jam band music festivals
- Al and the Transamericans
