= Chuck Garvey =

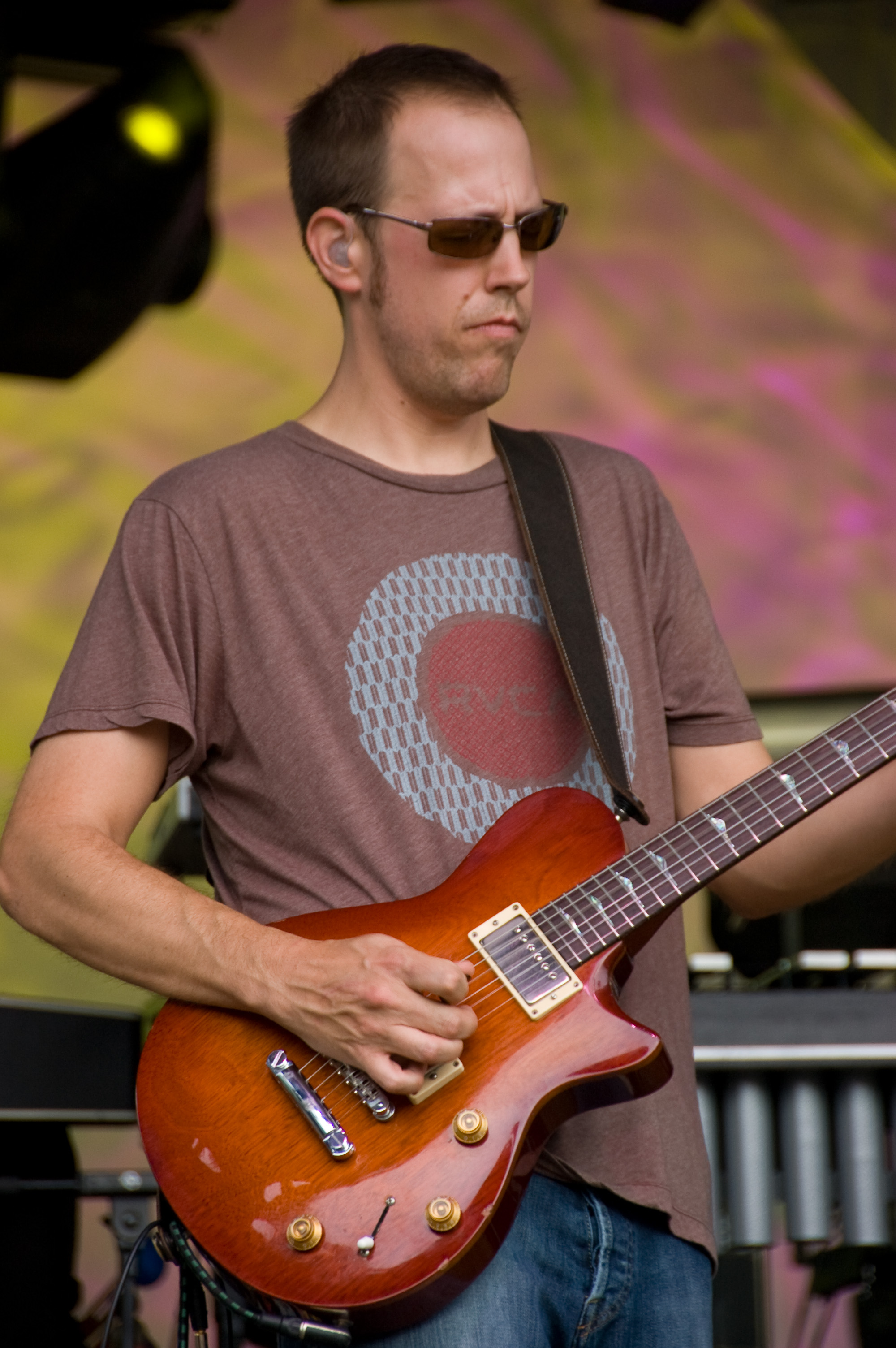
- Chuck Garvey performing with moe. on May 25, 2008

Background information
- Origin: New Hartford, NY
- Genres: Progressive rock rock music
- Occupation: musician
- Instruments: Electric guitar acoustic guitar Saxophone
- Years active: 1989 – present
- Label: Fatboy Records
- Website: moe.org

Chuck Garvey is one of two guitarists for the American rock band moe. His playing has been influenced by Frank Zappa, Mick Ronson, David Bowie, Pete Townshend, Andy Summers, Jimi Hendrix, and Stevie Ray Vaughan. He lives in the Cincinnati, Ohio area.

On the morning of November 6, 2021, Garvey suffered a stroke while at home. In 2023 Garvey returned to moe. full time after recovering from the stroke.

== moe. ==
Garvey is one of the founding members of moe. along with Rob Derhak. Both first played a Halloween show at a friend's request in 1989 with drummer Ray Schwartz. Since then, Garvey has been co-guitarist of the band along with Al Schnier.

He was recently voted, along with Schnier, as one of the "Top 20 new Guitar Gods" for a Rolling Stone magazine cover story.

== Other bands ==
Garvey has also performed as part of Ha Ha the Moose with Derhak and moe. drummer Jim Loughlin, as well as with the All Thumbs Trio.
