= Al Schnier =

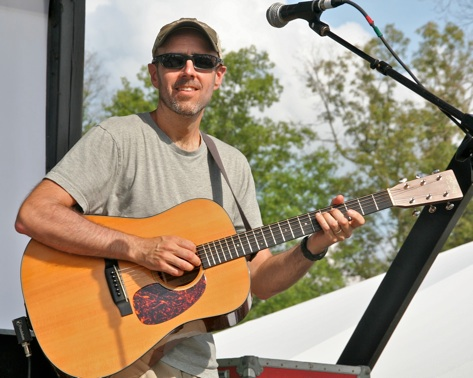
- Al Schnier performing with Moe on June 11, 2009.

Background information
- Born: January 9, 1968 (age 57)
- Origin: New Hartford, NY
- Genres: Progressive rock rock music folk rock electronica
- Occupation: musician
- Instrument(s): electric guitar acoustic guitar mandolin Moog synthesizer keyboard
- Years active: 1991–present
- Labels: Fatboy Records; Basemental Records
- Website: http://www.alschnier.com

Al Schnier (born January 9, 1968) is a musician most noted for being one of two guitarists for the American jam band Moe.

== History ==
Schnier was born on January 9, 1968, in Syracuse, New York. He attended New Hartford Central High School in Oneida County, New York, before going to college at State University of New York at Oneonta (SUNY) in 1990. He graduated from SUNY with a Bachelor of Arts in Philosophy and a Bachelor of Fine Arts in Graphic Arts. Al married his first wife Diane and had two children. He got divorced in 2013 and remarried in 2016.

== Music career ==
As found at his website, Schnier wrote his first original piece of music in 1978, of which a part would later appear on his solo musical release al.one. His first band was in 1982 during eighth grade and was named "Cuttin' Loose." It was a Neil Young and Rush tribute band that played only two shows. During high school and college he performed in various cover bands. In 1990, Schnier was playing in a psychedelic rock band in Oneonta, New York, called Unclaimed Freight, when he discovered the first original recordings by Moe (period absent until 1992), a band based in Buffalo, New York. "I heard that tape," Al recalled, "and I thought, 'This is the kind of band I want to play in.' ... Of course, I never thought I'd be playing with moe., but six months later I ended up moving to Buffalo, and my next introduction to the band was actually sitting in with them." In early 1991, Schnier filled in for Dave Kessler in Moe, playing electric guitar and congas at Chicklets House in Buffalo, New York. After this time, Schnier would occasionally play with the band, adding a third guitar to Kessler and Chuck Garvey's mix. Schnier officially joined the band in January 1992 and Kessler left several months later due to lack of interest. To this day, Schnier is with Moe fulltime, adding instruments such as mandolin, acoustic guitar, keyboards, and Moog to his contributions.

Schnier has also been a part of several side project bands. In 1999, he formed an Americana-influenced folk rock group called Al and the Transamericans. He released an album, "Analog", and continues to play sporadic shows with the group, usually in or around his current hometown of Utica.

In July 2001, Schnier began work on an electronica project he named al.one. The name is a play on the fact that Schnier performs all instruments and duties on the album. The self-titled album was released in October 2001 and he has performed a few solo shows in support of the release.

In 2003, Schnier joined with his wife, Diane, to create an album based on her musical talents. Over the course of a year, they recorded the album "Before Cowboys", with Diane playing piano, drums, and singing while Schnier performed all other musical duties. After the release, Schnier toured with Diane and a small group, dubbed Before Cowboys.

Schnier has also been a part of Phil Lesh and Friends during a number of shows, including in May 2005 for three shows in the San Francisco, California, area. Schnier described collaborating with Lesh as follows: "I’m a big fan of the Dead, so it was a real treat for me to get to go to the Grateful Dead rehearsal facility and hang out with Phil. We rehearsed for like, I want to say four or five days, and then we did three shows. It was awesome."

Schnier is an aspiring engineer & producer. He has produced & engineered all of his solo work, as well as both of his wife's albums, along with several moe. projects (including some of the tracks on The Conch). He has also worked on projects for other bands including The Brakes & Okemah. Schnier owns his own studio, Basemental Studios, in upstate NY.

Schnier is also a founding board member of the voter registration group, Headcount.

== Gear ==
Moe:

- Effects: Guitar / Minimoog > Fulltone Clyde Wah-wah pedal > DOD 440 Envelope Filter > Analogman Comprosser > Timmy > Zvex Fuzz Factory > Diamond Memory Lane > Analogman BiChorus > Diaz Tremodillo > Analogman a/b switch > Oldfield Marquis 30
- Guitars: Fender Custom Shop Telecaster Custom with Bigbsy and Seymour Duncan Custom Shop pickups, Gibson ES335
