= Rob Derhak =

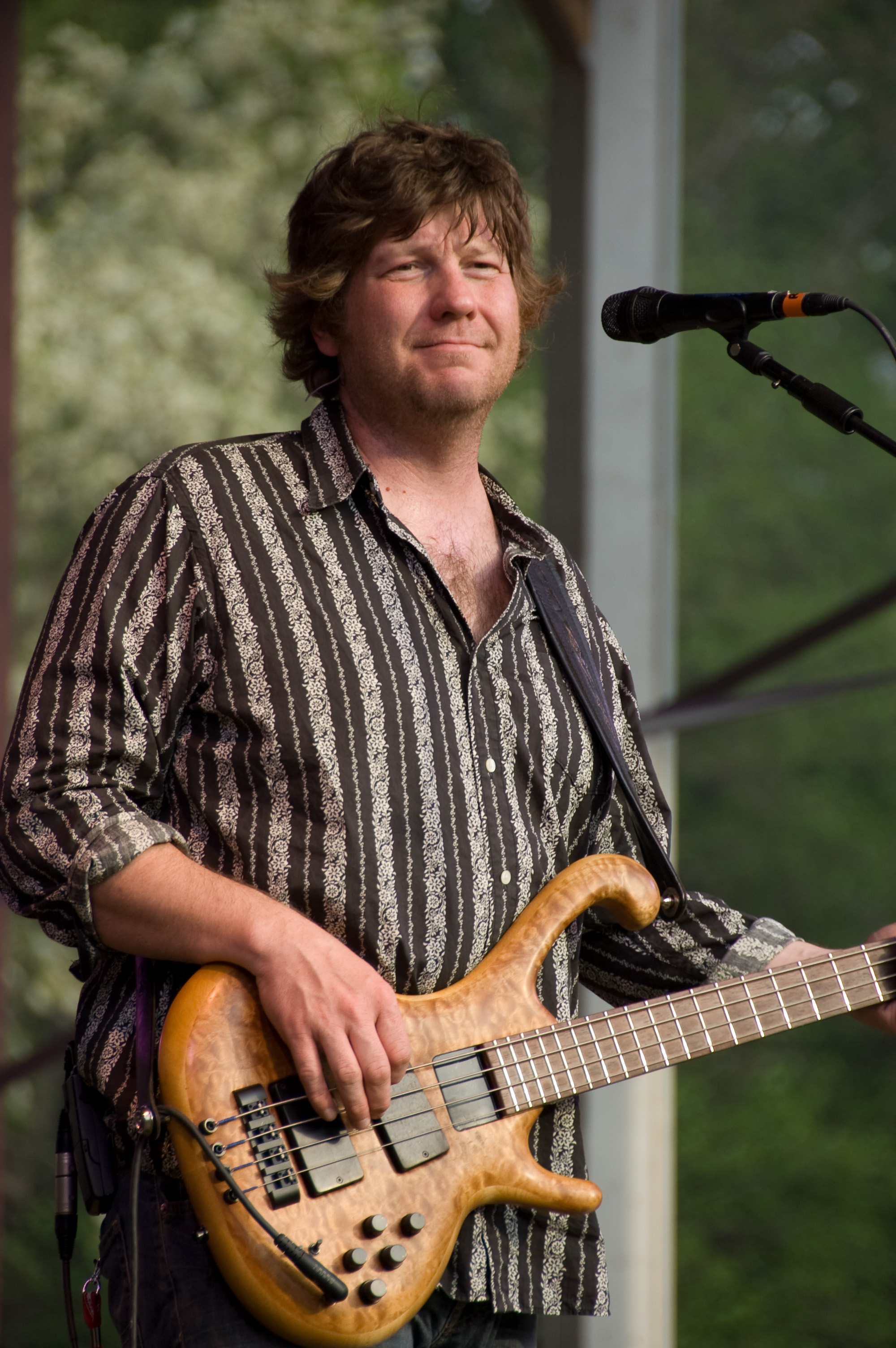
- Rob Derhak performing with moe. on May 25, 2008.

Background information
- Born: Robert Derhak; August 16, 1968 (age 57)
- Origin: Whitestown, New York
- Genres: Progressive rock, rock, jam
- Instrument: Bass guitar
- Years active: 1991–present
- Label: Fatboy
- Website: http://www.moe.org

Robert Derhak, also known simply as Rob, is the bass guitar player and a founding member of the American jam band moe.

== History ==
Derhak's earliest known time performing as a member of a band was on Halloween 1989, playing at a party with guitarist Chuck Garvey and a drummer named Ray Schwartz. He officially formed a band with Garvey, Schwartz, and others, in the Winter of 1990, calling themselves "Five Guys Named Moe", after the Louis Jordan song. They played several shows in the Buffalo, New York area. By the fall of 1990 the band was officially called moe., with the full stop being added the following year.

Derhak went to college at State University of New York at Buffalo (SUNY) where the band moe. was solidified.

Derhak was diagnosed with oropharyngeal cancer in July 2017, prompting moe to go on indefinite hiatus to allow time for his treatment. Derhak was declared cancer-free in December 2017 which coincided with moe. announcing a 2018 return to live performance.

Moe returned to the stage at the Capitol Theatre in Port Chester NY on February 2, 2018, and have since resumed a regular touring schedule.

== Side projects ==
Besides his full-time job in moe., Derhak was also a member of Ha Ha the Moose, a band with fellow moe. members Garvey and Jim Loughlin (drums). The band's name comes from a saying of Derhak's son, Eddie, about a toy moose. The band has only played a handful of shows between 2000 and 2008, most of which were in the Northeastern part of the United States. Ha Ha The Moose has also played at Summercamp and most recently at moe.down IX, where they briefly sat in with The PMG and played an unannounced late night set after moe.'s third set on Saturday, August 30 (actually the early hours of Sunday, August 31).

In 2003 Derhak teamed up with several members of Assembly of Dust, including Andy Herrick (drums), Adam Terrell (guitar) and Nate Wilson (keyboards). The group called themselves "Swampdonkey" and performed also exclusively in the Northeastern United States, playing several shows at the Alehouse in Portland, Maine, at moe.down IV, and finally at the Revolution Hall in Troy, New York.
