= The Original Surfaris =

American band

Background information
- Also known as: The Surfaris, The Customs
- Origin: Fullerton/La Habra, California, United States
- Genres: Surf rock
- Years active: 1962–1965
- Labels: Impact; Regand; Northridge; Reprise Records; Del-Fi Records; Felsted; Sundazed Music
- Past members: Bob Bernard; Mike "Sticks" Biondo; Bobby Esco; Jim Tran; Al Valdez; Chuck Vehle; Larry Weed; Doug Wiseman; Larry Steudle

The (Original) Surfaris were a surf music band from Fullerton, California. They were active from the early to mid 1960s and had singles released on various labels which included Del-Fi, Northridge, and Reprise.

== History ==
In 1960, three young friends, Al Valdez at the piano, Mike Biondo on drums, and Richard Lippy played at the 8th grade graduation dance of St. Mary's Elementary School in Fullerton, California.

In the summer of the same year, Valdez, Biondo, guitarist Bobby Esco, and sax player Bob Bernard formed The Vogues and started playing at school assemblies.

Guitarist Larry Weed, with a country and western musical background, replaced Esco soon after. Weed, notably, used to wear his belt buckle on the side when onstage, "so he would not scratch the back of his Fender guitar".

In late 1961, a Sunday morning all-Mexican television show on KCHOP channel 13 announced that they were looking for musical groups to play on the show, and Valdez's mother phoned the show to submit the candidacy of the band her son was playing in. The Vogues, with Doug Wiseman having replaced Bob Bernard on sax, were contacted by Victor Regina, owner of a pizza stand on Western Avenue, also doubling as a music agent, who helped them, under the new name he gave them, The Customs, record their first single, "Steppin' Out" and "Hi Hat", both written by former member Bobby Esco. Because Regina had put up all the money for the recording session, he took sole credit as the composer of the two songs.

Bassist Jim Tran, who was playing in a Yorba Linda musical trio at the time, was added to the band, soon after the session. Around the early summer of 1962, they started appearing regularly at a bar near Big Bear, with Wiseman's and Biondo's fathers driving them there. Soon after, with Chuck Vehle also on guitar, they changed their name to The Surfaris, which was a word play between "surf" and "The Safaris", a music group well known at the time for their hit "Image of a Girl".

The Danville Battle of the Bands gave the group a lot of exposure and more jobs. They started playing in the Ventura/Oxnard area. While performing there, they backed Bobby Vinton and others.

Between October 1962 and through January 1963, they recorded in the studio of producer Tony Hilder a number of songs written by Larry Weed, such as "Moment of Truth" and "Delano Soul Beat", also recording covers of "Ghost Riders in the Sky" and "Pipeline". The tracks "Moment of Truth" and "Delano Soul Beat" were released on Hilder's own Impact label, as part of a surf music compilation album titled Shake, Shout and Soul. These tracks subsequently appeared on various compilation albums, such as Wheels (Diplomat Records LP 2309); The World of Surfin' (Almor LP 108); Surf's Up at Banzai Pipeline (Northridge Records LP 101); and others.

After some months, the band again went into the studio with Hilder producing and recorded a number of tracks intended to be released on the Impact label, as their first full-length LP. Two of the tracks, "Bombora" and "Surfari" were leased to Del-Fi Records, which sent them out as a single. But the record, even though it started selling well in the state had to be pulled from the stores because of a lawsuit.

It was in early 1963 that, while the band was on the road, the surf instrumental "Wipe Out" came out and broke big nationwide. It was written and performed by a Glendora, California band who also called themselves The Surfaris. The Glendora group's management sued for the exclusive use of the name and, in the trial that followed, the judge awarded them sole use of "The Surfaris". However, the judge also allowed the Fullerton band to carry on under the name The Original Surfaris, although they continued to be billed in the various venues they played as "The Surfaris".

After recording hot rod tracks, such as "Gum-Dipped Slicks", The Original Surfaris started changing their musical style, and Jim Tran along with Al Valdez left the group. The Original Surfaris started doing more vocals, in the soul and blues vein, until eventually breaking up in May 1965.

== After the break-up ==
Mike Biondo went into the U.S. Army and then worked in a corporate position for United Gypsum.

Jim Tran joined the U.S. Coast Guard and then worked as an engineer for the Rancho Water District in Costa Mesta, California.

Al Valdez served in the U.S. Air Force Reserves and, after his discharge, spent the next ten years singing in a musical duo in Lake Tahoe and Orange County venues, before going solo.

Doug Wiseman went into the construction business where he became an independent contractor in his La Habra, California birthplace.

== Legacy ==
The Original Surfaris, in their various incarnations, were "one of the most highly regarded" and "creative" surf groups of the 1960s, but also remained at the time "one of the most obscure" ones. Critics described their music as featuring "reverb galore, swaggering sax and a tough surf sound", while their best tracks were praised for their "spooky reverb guitar lines and Latin-influenced minor melodies" that were hallmarks of much of the best instrumental surf music.

They rose and peaked at a very young age: One night in 1962, the band was playing in a hotel bar and they got arrested by the police because they were all under 18 years old. Another surf music group from Los Angeles named themselves The Bomboras inspired by the instrumental track.

The Original Surfaris allegedly never received any money for the tracks they recorded with Tony Hilder, since they had signed all their publishing rights away for one dollar per song.

In 1995, the album Bombora after being shelved for over thirty years, was finally released on the Sundazed label.

== Discography ==
Composers given as listed on respective record

=== Singles ===
As The Customs:

- "Steppin Out" // "Hi Hat" (Regand 1062, 1962)

As The Surfaris:

- "Surfin 63" [=Hi Hat] // "Boss Beat" [=Steppin Out] (Regand 1062, 1963) reissue of the Customs record
- "Moment of Truth" // "Church Key" [B-side by The Biscaynes] (Northridge 1001, 3/63)
- "Moment of Truth" // "Church Key" [B-side by The Biscaynes] (Reprise 20.180, 5/63) reissue
- "Bombora" // "Surfari" (Del-Fi 4219, 8/63)
- "Midnight Surf" // "Psyche-Out" (Chancellor 1142, ?/63) never released
- "Tor-Chula" // "Psyche-Out" (Felsted 8688, 10/63)

As The Original Surfaris:

- "Gum Dipped Slicks" // "High Time" (Surfari 301, 4/64)

=== Post break-up ===
In 1995, Sundazed released a CD titled Bombora! (SC-6063) that featured the tracks that had been recorded by Hilder but never released, along with other tracks and the group's singles, listing the original composers:

1. "Bombora" (L.Weed-J.Tran-D.Weisman-M.Biondo-C.Vehle)
2. "Vesuvius" (R.Hafner)
3. "Surfari" (L.Weed-J.Tran-D.Weisman-M.Biondo-C.Vehle)
4. "Down Under" (L.Weed-J.Tran-D.Weisman-M.Biondo-C.Vehle)
5. "Surf Angel" (L.Weed-J.Tran-D.Weisman-M.Biondo-C.Vehle)
6. "Intoxica" (R.Hafner)
7. "Wipeout" (M.Fankhauser)
8. "Beep Beep" (W.M.Brown-J.Rose-S.Metz)
9. "Latin'ia" (T.Nuñes-M.Hilder)
10. "Church Key" (D.Darnold-N.Knowles)
11. "Board Walk" (L.Weed-J.Tran-D.Weisman-M.Biondo-C.Vehle)
12. "Steel Pier" (W.M.Brown)

- In 1995, Sundazed released on CD a surf music compilation album, originally released by Northridge in 1963 (NM-101), with the same title, Surfs Up! at Banzai-Pipeline (SC-6080). The album and the CD featured three tracks by The Original Surfaris:

"Moment of Truth" (L.Weed-D.Weisman)
"Kalani Wipeout" (V.Regina-L.Weed-A.Valdez), and
"Ghost Riders in the Sky", an instrumental version of the country and western hit, recorded live. The guitar player, in the break, plays the riff from The Shadows' hit "Apache". The track does not appear in any other release featuring the band.

- Between 2003 and 2005, Sundazed Music issued four compilation CDs, Volumes I to IV, titled Lost Legends of Surf Guitar. The first CD, Big Noise From Waimea! (SC-11126) features three tracks by The Original Surfaris:

"Failsafe" (Lloyd-Greenspoon)
"Exotic" (Bruce Morgan), and
"Surfs Up" (L.Weed-A.Valdez-J.Tran-D.Weisman-M.Biondo-C.Vehle), none of which had been issued before.

- In 2007, Ace Records issued the compilation CD The Birth of the Surf (CHD-1155), which included The Original Surfaris'

"Latin Soul" (Robert J. Hafner)
The track had previously appeared "in no less than five different budget labels during the surf boom," such as Ava (A-28, 1965).

== See also ==
- Dave Myers and The Surftones

== Sources ==
- Dalley, Robert J. Surfin' Guitars: Instrumental Surf Bands of the Sixties, Surf Publications, California, USA, 1988, ISBN 978-0-913944-04-2
- Blair, John. The Illustrated Discography of Surf Music 1961–1965, 2nd edition, Pierian Press, Michigan, USA, 1985, ISBN 0-87650-174-9
- "Reissues Recall Surfing Craze" by Tom Popson, Chicago Tribune, August 17, 1995
- Dalley, Robert J. liner notes for the Bombora! CD, Sundazed Music, 1995
- Whitburn, Joel. The Billboard Book of Top 40 Hits, Watson-Guptill Publications, 7th revised edition, 2000, ISBN 978-0823076901
- Burke, David & Alan Taylor liner notes for The Birth of the Surf CD, Ace Records, 2007
