= Church Key =

1960 single by The Revels

Single by The Revels
- B-side: "Vesuvius"
- Released: November 1960
- Genre: Surf
- Length: 2:03
- Label: Impact 1-IM / 1-IMX
- Songwriters: Dan Darnold, Norman Knowles

The Revels singles chronology
"Six Pak" (1959)	"Church Key" (1960)	"Intoxica" (1961)

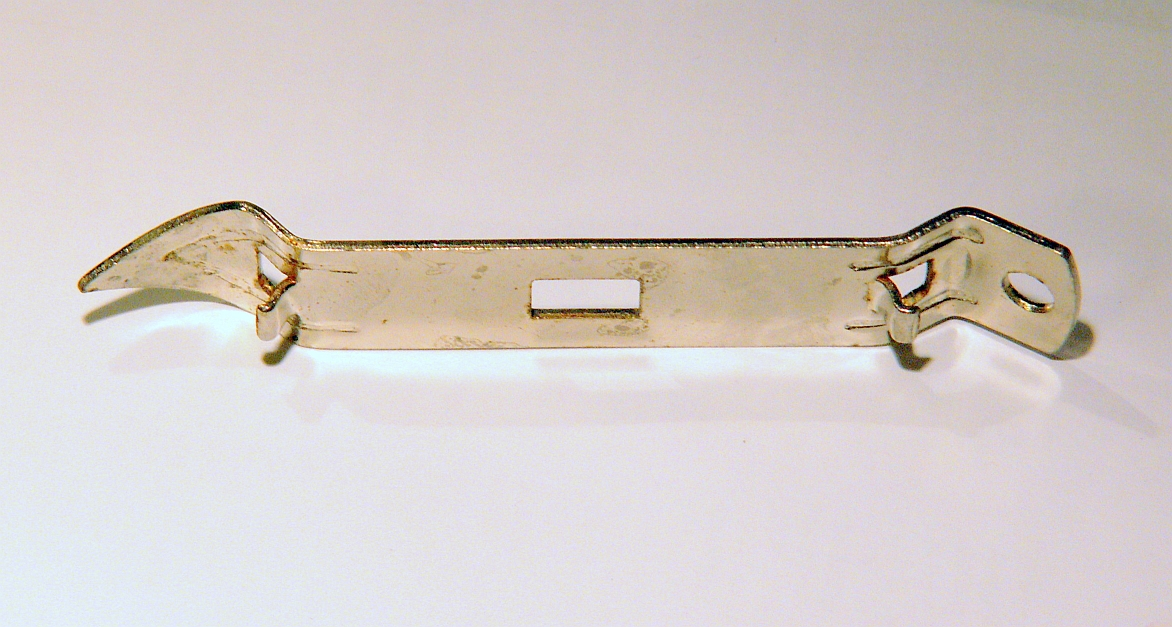
A church key beer opener

"Church Key" is an instrumental single that was released by California surf group The Revels on Tony Hilder's Impact Records label in 1960. It was a hit for the group and later a hit for Dave Myers and his Surf-Tones.

The title refers to the slang use of "church key" to mean a device for opening beer cans or beer bottles.

== Background ==
The song was written by Dan Darnold and Norman Knowles.

A version of the song by The Biscaynes appears on the Surf's Up! At Banzai Pipeline compilation album.

== The Revels version ==
=== History ===
The involvement with Tony Hilder came about as a result of meeting him early in 1960. The group were playing for a March of Dimes benefit in San Luis Obispo at a Chevrolet dealership. Hilder had come into town to promote a couple of his artists, Billy Watkins and Charles Wright. He was looking for a band to back them while on tour. Knowles wanted Hilder to think about The Revels as the backing group. It didn't happen but Hilder still left his business card. The second time that the group came across Hilder was in the summer of 1960. The group had driven down to LA for what was to be their second recording session. They were at a small studio located on the corner of Santa Monica and Western. The session wasn't too fruitful so Knowles decided to ring Hilder with his experience to come over to help them with the session. Soon Hilder arrived with Robert Hafner who was his partner and songwriter. Hilder's attention was drawn to Dan Darnold's playing around with the vibrato bar. Hafner helped with a melody centering around a hook with the vibrato. An arrangement was developed and later the title "Church Key" came about. Barbara Adkins, Hilder's girlfriend and future wife provided the giggles on the recording. Robert Hafner had some other tunes with him, one of which was "Vesuvius". The band learnt it in the studio and recorded it. Not having his own label to release the recording at the time, Hilder and Norman Knowles started their own co. as partners, splitting the costs as well as the profits.

The A side which was credited to The Revels with Barbara Adkins. The B side to the single was "Vesuvius which was written by Robert J. Hafner However, the 1959 release on CT 1-IM, 1-IMX credits Norman Knowles as the composer. Knowles' involvement as well As Hafner's is confirmed in Catalog of Copyright Entries: Third series. This was the first release on Hilder's Impact Records label. It was also previously released on the CT label which was another record label of Hilders. According to Norman Knowles, the song was banned in some cities because of it being "derogatory of religion." According to the liner notes in the CD release of Intoxica! The Best Of The Revels by John Blair (author of The Illustrated Discography of Surf Music, 1961-1965), Adkins who did the female giggling voice on the recording was Tony Hilder's girlfriend and future wife.

=== Appearances ===
It appears on The Revels 1964 album Revels on a Rampage, Intoxica!!! The Best of the Revels in 1995 and various artist compilations Kahuna Classics: Surf Music, Surf Wax: Songs of the Beach and Instro Poker of Aces. The single was picked up by Liberty Records for national distribution. The banner that it was released under was that of Impact. This was to retain the identity of Tony Hilder's label.

=== The track ===
The track starts off with a guitar intro, following with the main theme of the number is handled by the guitar in a 12 bar blues progression. There is a party atmosphere in the track. The title of the track is spoken. There is the sound of a beer can being opened as well as a voice of giggling female. The piano player on the track is said to be Langdon Winner.

=== The group ===
"Church Key" and "Comanche" were the tracks The Revels were best known for. "Church Key" was a hit for them in 1960. The band's next single was "Intoxica" / "Tequila" which was released in 1961.

== Dave Myers and his Surf-Tones version ==
"Church Key"

Single by Dave Myers and His Surf-Tones
- B-side: "Passion"
- Released: 1963
- Genre: Surf
- Length: 2:18
- Label: Impact 27 / 27-IM / 27-IMX
- Songwriters: Dan Darnold, Norman Knowles

Dave Myers and His Surf-Tones singles chronology
"Church Key" (1963)	"Gear!" (1964)

Dave Myers and The Surftones had their version released on Impact records as well. Their version which was backed with "Passion" was released on Impact 27 / 27-IM / 27-IMX. The B side composition was credited to Robert J. Hafner and Anthony Hilder. They managed to have a local hit with it in L.A. in 1963. The version of "Church Key" by Dave Myers & The Surftones is on the ultimate surf music playlist by SurferToday.com.

== Releases including other versions ==
List of singles
Act	Title	Catalogue	Year	Notes
The Revels	"Church Key" / "Vesuvius"	CT 1-IM, 1-IMX	1959 / 1960 ?	
The Revels with Barbara Adkins	"Church Key" / "Vesuvius"	Impact 1-IM / 1-IMX	1960	
The Gonzos	"Church Key" / "Very Muddy Waters"	Donna 1330	1960	
The Surfaris * The Biscaynes	"Moment Of Truth" / * "Church Key"	Northridge 1001	1963	
Jim Waller And The Deltas	"Surfin' Wild" / "Church Key"	Arvee A-5072	1963	
Dave Myers and his Surf-Tones	"Church Key" / "Passion"	Impact 27-IMX	1963	
Dave Cooper and the Continentals	"Church Key" / "Continental Surf"	Westco WC - 7	1964	
Opposite Six	"Church Key Pt. 68" / "Continental Surf"	South Shore SS45-721		
The Lone Surfer And His Super Pals	"Church Key" / "Horror Beach"	Planet Pimp Records – PP-003	1993	
* The Trashmen The Wailers	* "Church Key" / "Wailin'"	Sundazed / Norton LV-1	1999	

List of EPs
Act	Title	Catalogue	Year	Notes
The Surf Raiders	Surfin' "81": Live At The Ice House	Moxie Records M-1039	1981	

Appears on album
Act	Title	Catalogue	Year	Notes
Centurians	Surfers' Pajama Party	Del-Fi Records DFLP 1228	1963	
The Impacts	Wipe Out!	Del-Fi Records DFLP 1234	1963	
The Rivieras	Let's Have a Party	U.S.A. 102	1964	
Various Artists	Jet Set Dance Discothèque Vol. 3	Audio Fidelity DFS 7041	1964	"Church Key" by unknown artist
Jon and the Nightriders	Recorded Live At Hollywood's Famous Whisky A Go-Go	Voxx Records VXS 200.005	1981	
The Halibuts	Halibut Beach	What Records? W12-2407	1984	
The Original Surfaris	Bombora!	Sundazed Music SC 6063	1995	
The Surf Teens	Surf Mania	Bacchus Archives BA 1127	1998	
The Phantom Surfers	The Exciting Sounds Of Model Road Racing	Hobby Hut Records – HH-124, Lookout! Records LK183	1998	
Al Garcia and the Rhythm Kings	Exotic And Rockin' Instrumentals, 1963-1964	Bacchus Archives BA1135	1999	
Detroit Bros.	Murdered by the Surf Music	PPDET-0004	2000	
Naked City	Live In Quebec '88	Air Cuts AC2CD8042	2017	

Note: "Church Key" by The Fabulous Pharaohs released in 1966 is a different track all together and was credited to Fisher-Stevenson.
