= Surf's Up! At Banzai Pipeline =

Compilation album by Various
- Released: 1963
- Studio: Stereo Masters, Hollywood, California
- Genre: Surf
- Label: Northridge Records NM101
- Producer: Tony Hilder

Surf's Up! At Banzai Pipeline was a 1963 various artist record album compilation that featured recordings by The Surfaris, Dave Myers and The Surftones, The Soul Kings, Coast Continentals and Jim Waller & The Deltas. It has been re-released a couple of times since.

== Background ==
The record was originally released on the Northridge Records label in 1963. Later the same year Reprise Records released it in both mono and stereo format with a simpler title, Surf's Up!. The only real difference between the Northridge and Reprise release was a different cover. In April, 1995, the album was one of five re-released albums that appeared in a Sundazed ad in Billboard which also included the Hot Rod City various artist comp, and albums by Challengers, Revells and Jim Waller & the Deltas. In August that year, Billboard indicated that the re-release comp was near its completion.

In the book Pop Surf Culture: Music, Design, Film, and Fashion from the Bohemian Surf Boom by Brian Chidester and Domenic Priore, the two songs "Aqua Limbo" and "Laguna Limbo Luau" by Dave Myers were singled out as very interesting. The author remarked that Dave Myers & the Surftones had suddenly become the ultimate exotica surf band. This was due to the shakers, rattling and vocal sounds.

== Track listing ==
Surf's Up! At Banzai PipelineNorthridge Records NM101
#	Act	Title	Composer	Time	Notes
A1	The Soul Kings	"Delano Soul Beat"	Al Garcia	2:17	
A2	Dave Myers and The Surftones	"Aqua Limbo"	Robt J. Hafner	2:13	
A3	The Surfaris	"Moment Of Truth"	Doug Wiseman, Larry Weed	2:28	
A4	Neal Nissenson	"Intoxica"	Robt J. Hafner	2:07	
A5	The Surfaris	"Ghost Riders In The Sky"	Stan Jones	3:19	
A6	The Surfaris	"Kalani Wipeout"	Al Valdez, Larry Weed, Victor Regina	2:20	
B1	Dave Myers And The Surftones	"Laguna Limbo Luau"	Bruce Morgan	2:00	
B2	Jim Waller And The Deltas	"Surfers Stomp"	Joe Saraceno, M. Daughtry	3:04	
B3	Doug Hume	Surfin' Tragedy	Robt J. Hafner, Anthony J. Hilder	2:18	
B4	The Biscaynes	Church Key	Dan Darnold, Norman Knowles	1:51	
B5	Bob Vaught And The Renegaids	"San Onofre"	Bob Vaught, Tom Jaques	2:00	
B6	Bob Hafner	"Surf Creature"	Robt J. Hafner	2:23	

== Personnel ==
CD
Role	Person
Vic Anesini	Mastering
Mastering	Chris Herles
Mastering	Bob Irwin
Producer	Tony Hilder
Project Assistant	Bex Brownell
Project Assistant	Jeff Smith
Project Assistant	Kip Smith

== Release history ==
List of releases
Title	Release info	Year	F	Notes
Surfs Up! At Banzai-Pipeline	Northridge Records NM101	1963	LP	
Surf's Up!	Reprise R-6094	1963	LP	
Surfs Up! At Banzai-Pipeline	Sundazed Music SC 6080	1995	CD	
