= Pulp Fiction (soundtrack) =

1994 soundtrack album

Music from the Motion Picture Pulp Fiction

Soundtrack album by various artists
- Released: September 27, 1994
- Genres: Rock and roll; surf rock; pop; soul; country
- Length: 41:11
- Label: MCA
- Producers: Quentin Tarantino; Lawrence Bender

Professional ratings
Review scores
| Source | Rating |
|---|---|
| AllMusic | 4.5/5 stars |
| NME | 8/10 |
| Rolling Stone | (favorable) |

Music from the Motion Picture Pulp Fiction is the soundtrack to Quentin Tarantino's 1994 film Pulp Fiction, released on September 27, 1994, by MCA Records. No traditional film score was commissioned for Pulp Fiction. The film contains a mix of American rock and roll, surf music, pop and soul. The soundtrack is equally untraditional, consisting of nine songs from the film, four tracks of dialogue snippets followed by a song, and three tracks of dialogue alone. Seven songs featured in the film were not included in the original 41-minute soundtrack.

The album reached No. 21 on the Billboard 200, while Urge Overkill's cover of the Neil Diamond song "Girl, You'll Be a Woman Soon" peaked at No. 59 on the Billboard Hot 100.

== Composition ==
Tarantino used an eclectic assortment of songs by various artists. Notable songs include Dick Dale's now-iconic rendition of "Misirlou", which is played during the opening credits. Tarantino chose surf music for the basic score of the film because, "it just seems like rock 'n' roll Ennio Morricone music, rock 'n' roll spaghetti Western music."

Many of the songs on the soundtrack were suggested to Tarantino by musician Boyd Rice through their mutual friend Allison Anders, including Dick Dale's "Misirlou". Other songs were suggested to Tarantino by his friends Chuck Kelley and Laura Lovelace, who were credited as music consultants. Lovelace also appeared in the film as Laura the waitress.

In addition to the surf-rock rendition of "Misirlou", other notable songs include "Jungle Boogie" by Kool & the Gang, Dusty Springfield's version of "Son of a Preacher Man", "Flowers on the Wall" by the Statler Brothers and "Bustin' Surfboards" by The Tornadoes.

Excerpts of dialogue include Jules' "Ezekiel 25:17" speech and the "Royale with Cheese" exchange between Jules and Vincent.

A two-disc collector's edition of the album was issued in 2002—the first disc contained the songs, including four additional tracks; and the second disc was a spoken-word interview with Tarantino.

Woody Thorne's 1961 song "Teenagers in Love" is one of the two songs missing from the collector's edition soundtrack. The other song is unique to the film: it is Ricky Nelson's "Waitin' in School" as performed by actor Gary Shorelle, which plays as Vincent and Mia enter Jackrabbit Slim's.

== Influence ==
The soundtrack reached No. 21 on the Billboard 200, and at the time, was certified platinum by the Canadian Recording Industry Association (CRIA), denoting shipments in excess of 100,000 units in Canada. By September 1995, the album had sold over 1.6 million copies in the United States, and by April 1996, sales stood at two million units.

The soundtrack helped launch the band Urge Overkill, which covered Neil Diamond's "Girl, You'll Be a Woman Soon" (produced by Kramer) in 1993, into a mainstream market. Sony "received a nice sum" for "Son of a Preacher Man" and Kool & the Gang enjoyed a resurgence when "Jungle Boogie" was released on the soundtrack.

The Orange County Register described why the soundtrack of Pulp Fiction stood out from all the others: "Unlike so many soundtracks, which just seem to be repositories for stray songs by hit acts regardless of whether they fit the film's mood, Tarantino's use of music in Reservoir Dogs and Pulp Fiction exploded with a brash, Technicolor, pop-culture intensity that mirrored the stories he was telling." Karyn Rachtman was the music supervisor on both Reservoir Dogs and Pulp Fiction.

Analyzing the success of Tarantino's marketing, Billboard chalked up MCA's compilation to identifying the market niche: "Pulp Fiction ... successfully spoke to those attuned to the hip, stylized nature of those particular films." The eclectic "mix-and-match strategy" is true to the film. "In some cases, like Pulp Fiction and Reservoir Dogs, which were not geared toward any specific demographic, the soundtracks were still very focused albums", said Kathy Nelson, senior VP/general manager at MCA Soundtracks. "In both cases, the body of work—both the music and the film—has a specific personality."

In 1997, Gary Thompson of The Philadelphia Inquirer said that Pulp Fiction "reinvigorated surf rock". That statement would be defining for Del-Fi Records, owned by legendary producer Bob Keane; the Pulp Fiction soundtrack contained two songs that were originally released on Del-Fi: Bullwinkle Pt II by the Centurians, and Surf Rider by The Lively Ones. Del-Fi Records released a compilation CD in 1995 entitled Pulp Surfin' featuring songs by those bands plus sixteen other surf tracks from the vaults. The cover artwork was a parody of the Pulp Fiction film poster. Dave Burke, editor of British instrumental music magazine, Pipeline Instrumental Review, stated that the film "created a resurgence of interest in instrumental music".

Inspired by the soundtrack, advertisers started to use surf music in their commercials "to help sell everything from burritos to toothpaste", making surf music hugely popular again.

More than two years after the film was released, the influence and monetary success was still being felt in the industry. "Mundane commercials using Dick Dale '60s surf licks, the kind made popular again by the Pulp Fiction soundtrack...following a trend—in this case, a two-year-old hit movie."

== Track listing ==
| No. | Title | Writer(s) | Artist(s) | Length |
|---|---|---|---|---|
| 1. | "Misirlou (Note: Features dialogue "Pumpkin and Honey Bunny" by Tim Roth and Amanda Plummer)" | Nick Roubanis; Fred Wise; Milton Leeds; Chaim Tauber | Dick Dale & His Del-Tones | 2:27 |
| 2. | "Royale with Cheese" (Dialogue) | | Samuel L. Jackson and John Travolta | 1:42 |
| 3. | "Jungle Boogie" | Ronald Bell; Kool & the Gang | Kool & the Gang | 3:05 |
| 4. | "Let's Stay Together" | Al Green; Al Jackson Jr.; Willie Mitchell | Al Green | 3:15 |
| 5. | "Bustin' Surfboards" | Norman Sanders; Leonard Delaney | The Tornadoes | 2:26 |
| 6. | "Lonesome Town" | Baker Knight | Ricky Nelson | 2:13 |
| 7. | "Son of a Preacher Man" | John Hurley; Ronnie Wilkins | Dusty Springfield | 2:25 |
| 8. | "Bullwinkle Part II (Note: Features dialogue "Zed's Dead, Baby" by Maria de Medeiros and Bruce Willis)" | Dennis Rose; Ernest Furrow | The Centurians | 2:39 |
| 9. | "You Never Can Tell (Note: Features dialogue "Jack Rabbit Slims Twist Contest" by Jerome Patrick Hoban and Uma Thurman)" | Chuck Berry | Chuck Berry | 3:12 |
| 10. | "Girl, You'll Be a Woman Soon" | Neil Diamond | Urge Overkill | 3:09 |
| 11. | "If Love Is a Red Dress (Hang Me in Rags)" | Maria McKee | Maria McKee | 4:55 |
| 12. | "Comanche (Note: Features dialogue "Bring Out the Gimp" by Peter Greene and Duane Whitaker)" | Robert Hafner (sax solo by James Gordon) | The Revels | 2:10 |
| 13. | "Flowers on the Wall" | Lewis C. DeWitt | The Statler Brothers | 2:23 |
| 14. | "Personality Goes a Long Way" (Dialogue) | | Samuel L. Jackson and John Travolta | 1:00 |
| 15. | "Surf Rider" | Bob Bogle; Nole "Nokie" Edwards; Don Wilson | The Lively Ones | 3:18 |
| 16. | "Ezekiel 25:17" (Dialogue) | | Samuel L. Jackson | 0:51 |
| Total length: | | | | 41:11 |

=== Collector's edition ===
A collector's edition version of the soundtrack was released in 2002. It features remastered versions of the original sixteen tracks, along with five bonus tracks, including an interview with director Quentin Tarantino. There are single and two-disc releases of this version, with the track listings being identical; the two-disc version has the Tarantino interview on the second disc. The additional tracks are:

Collector's edition bonus tracks
| No. | Title | Writer(s) | Artist(s) | Length |
|---|---|---|---|---|
| 17. | "Since I First Met You" | H. B. Barnum | The Robins | 2:20 |
| 18. | "Rumble" | Link Wray; Milt Grant | Link Wray and His Ray Men | 2:25 |
| 19. | "Strawberry Letter 23" | Shuggie Otis | The Brothers Johnson | 4:57 |
| 20. | "Out of Limits" | Michael Gordon | The Marketts | 2:05 |
| 21. | "Stranger Than Fiction: Tarantino Talks!" (interview with Quentin Tarantino) | | | 16:11 |

=== Songs not on the soundtrack releases ===
- "Waitin' in School" performed by Gary Shorelle (not commercially available)
- "Ace of Spades" performed by Link Wray and His Ray Men
- "Teenagers in Love" performed by Woody Thorne

== Charts ==
=== Weekly charts ===
1994–1998 weekly chart performance for Pulp Fiction
| Chart (1994–1998) | Peak position |
|---|---|
| Australian Albums (ARIA) | 4 |
| Austrian Albums (Ö3 Austria) | 19 |
| Belgian Albums (Ultratop Flanders) | 21 |
| Belgian Albums (Ultratop Wallonia) | 13 |
| Canada Top Albums/CDs (RPM) | 12 |
| European Albums (Music & Media) | 14 |
| Finnish Albums (Suomen virallinen lista) | 31 |
| French Albums (SNEP) | 14 |
| German Albums (Offizielle Top 100) | 36 |
| Irish Albums (IFPI) | 8 |
| New Zealand Albums (RMNZ) | 2 |
| Scottish Albums (Official Charts) | 4 |
| Swedish Albums (Sverigetopplistan) | 1 |
| UK Compilation Albums (Official Charts) | 5 |
| US Billboard 200 | 21 |

2004 weekly chart performance for Pulp Fiction
| Chart (2004) | Peak position |
|---|---|
| Dutch Albums (Album Top 100) | 24 |

2007 weekly chart performance for Pulp Fiction
| Chart (2007) | Peak position |
|---|---|
| Spanish Albums (Promusicae) | 63 |

2012 weekly chart performance for Pulp Fiction
| Chart (2012) | Peak position |
|---|---|
| US Soundtrack Albums (Billboard) | 24 |

2014 weekly chart performance for Pulp Fiction
| Chart (2014) | Peak position |
|---|---|
| Swiss Albums (Schweizer Hitparade) | 58 |

2016 weekly chart performance for Pulp Fiction
| Chart (2016) | Peak position |
|---|---|
| Polish Albums (ZPAV) | 34 |

2020 weekly chart performance for Pulp Fiction
| Chart (2020) | Peak position |
|---|---|
| Hungarian Albums (MAHASZ) | 22 |

2021 weekly chart performance for Pulp Fiction
| Chart (2021) | Peak position |
|---|---|
| UK Soundtrack Albums (Official Charts) | 1 |

2024 weekly chart performance for Pulp Fiction
| Chart (2024) | Peak position |
|---|---|
| Greek Albums (IFPI) | 14 |

=== Year-end charts ===
1994 year-end chart performance for Pulp Fiction
| Chart (1994) | Position |
|---|---|
| Canada Top Albums/CDs (RPM) | 70 |

1995 year-end chart performance for Pulp Fiction
| Chart (1995) | Position |
|---|---|
| Australian Albums (ARIA) | 12 |
| Belgian Albums (Ultratop Flanders) | 44 |
| Belgian Albums (Ultratop Wallonia) | 41 |
| Canada Top Albums/CDs (RPM) | 21 |
| European Albums (Music & Media) | 20 |
| German Albums (Offizielle Top 100) | 97 |
| New Zealand Albums (RMNZ) | 10 |
| Swedish Albums & Compilations (Sverigetopplistan) | 6 |
| US Billboard 200 | 33 |
| US Soundtrack Albums (Billboard) | 5 |

1996 year-end chart performance for Pulp Fiction
| Chart (1996) | Position |
|---|---|
| US Soundtrack Albums (Billboard) | 4 |

2018 year-end chart performance for Pulp Fiction
| Chart (2018) | Position |
|---|---|
| Australian Vinyl Albums (ARIA) | 10 |

2019 year-end chart performance for Pulp Fiction
| Chart (2019) | Position |
|---|---|
| Australian Vinyl Albums (ARIA) | 16 |

2020 year-end chart performance for Pulp Fiction
| Chart (2020) | Position |
|---|---|
| Australian Vinyl Albums (ARIA) | 37 |

== Certifications ==
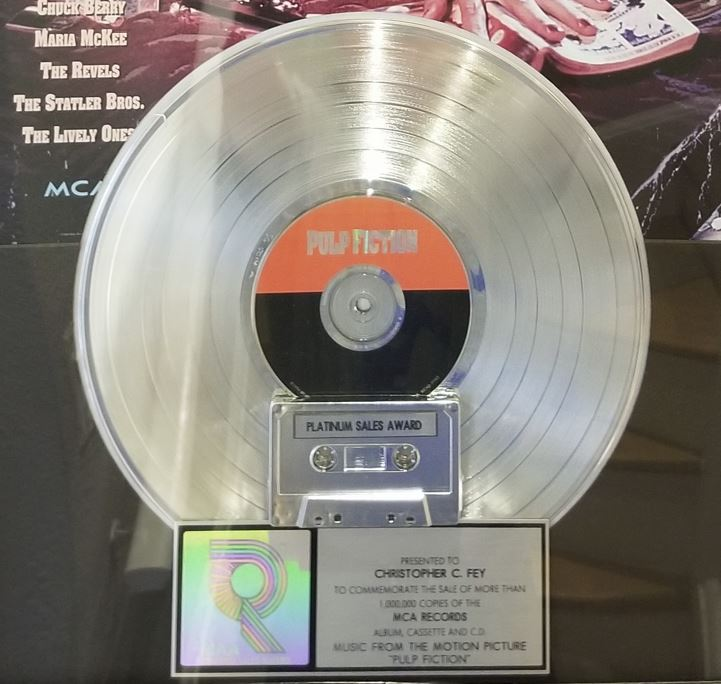
RIAA platinum record award for "Music from the Motion Picture Pulp Fiction"

Certifications for Pulp Fiction
| Region | Certification | Certified units/sales |
|---|---|---|
| Argentina (CAPIF) | Platinum | 60,000^{^} |
| Australia (ARIA) | 3× Platinum | 210,000^{^} |
| Belgium (BRMA) | Platinum | 50,000^{*} |
| Canada (Music Canada) | 3× Platinum | 300,000^{^} |
| Denmark (IFPI Danmark) sales since 2011 | 4× Platinum | 80,000^{‡} |
| France (SNEP) | Platinum | 300,000^{*} |
| Italy (FIMI) | Gold | 25,000^{*} |
| Japan (RIAJ) | Gold | 100,000^{^} |
| New Zealand (RMNZ) | Platinum | 15,000^{^} |
| New Zealand (RMNZ) digital | Gold | 7,500^{‡} |
| Norway (IFPI Norway) | Gold | 25,000^{*} |
| Poland (ZPAV) | Gold | 10,000^{‡} |
| Spain (Promusicae) | Platinum | 100,000^{^} |
| Sweden (GLF) | Platinum | 100,000^{^} |
| United Kingdom (BPI) | 3× Platinum | 900,000^{^} |
| United States (RIAA) | 3× Platinum | 3,500,000 |
Summaries
| Europe (IFPI) | 3× Platinum | 3,000,000^{*} |
^{*} Sales figures based on certification alone.^{^} Shipments figures based on certification alone.^{‡} Sales+streaming figures based on certification alone.
