= Bill Dobslaw =

American musician, producer, manager, and businessman

- Born: William Dobslaw; South Bend, Indiana
- Genres: Rock; pop; surf music
- Occupations: Singer-songwriter; record producer; businessman
- Instrument: Vocals
- Years active: 1963–present
- Labels: Riviera; USA; Columbia; Vogue Schallplatten; Norton

William Dobslaw is an American musician, producer, manager, and businessman from South Bend, Indiana, United States, famed for his association with the 1960s rock band, the Rivieras.

== Career ==
In 1963 Dobslaw discovered the local band, the Rivieras (consisting of Marty Fortson, Otto Nuss, Doug Gean, Joe Pennell, and Paul Dennert). Dobslaw became the band's manager, and was instrumental in booking them for shows, as well as a recording session at Columbia Recording Studios. Dobslaw oversaw the production, manufacturing, and distribution of the band's records. The Rivieras' first session yielded the hit, "California Sun". On its way to the top, rhythm guitarist and vocalist Fortson and lead guitarist Pennell already committed to joining the Marines. Dobslaw was responsible for keeping the band together; he stepped in as the band's new vocalist, as Jim Boal was brought in as the new lead guitarist. Willie Gaut was later brought in as rhythm guitarist and occasional vocalist. Under Dobslaw, the band continued to achieve chart activity and successful tours. Eight more singles were released, as well as two full-length albums. By 1965, the band's popularity had waned as they struggled with distribution and the changing music scene. From this point on, Dobslaw stepped down as vocalist, but still remained the bands' manager until the band officially folded the following year.

After the Rivieras disbanded, Dobslaw briefly left music and became a businessman. Around 1973, Dobslaw returned to his musical roots, switching gears to barbershop music. After viewing The Valleyaires, a South Bend group, Dobslaw joined the barbershop group. To this day, he is still an active member.

== Riviera label ==
After discovering the Rivieras in 1963, Dobslaw financed their first recording session, as well as pressed and distributed the following record independently through his newly created Riviera label. The ensuing success of "California Sun", coupled with distribution by USA Records, saw the label continue to distribute the Rivieras' records for the entirety of their career. With the disbanding of the band, the label went defunct by 1965/1966.

In addition to the Rivieras, Dobslaw signed one other band to the label and its sublabel, Shoreline. Originally known as the Kastaways, the Sigma Five released three 7" singles between 1964 and 1965. Riviera also released one full-length LP; Campus Party by the Rivieras in 1964. This album was the follow-up to the band's debut album, Let's Have a Party, which was released on USA Records. Most records released on the label without wide distribution are scarce to find today, and demand high values in the collectors' market.

=== Discography ===
No.	Artist	Titles	Rel.
1401	The Rivieras	"Played On" / "California Sun"	Oct. 1963
1401	The Rivieras	"California Sun" / "H B Goose Step"	Dec. 1963
1402	The Rivieras	"Little Donna" / "Let's Have a Party"	Mar. 1964
1403	The Rivieras	"Rockin' Robin" / "Battle Line"	Jul. 1964
1404	Kastaways	"Sweets For My Sweet" / "You Never Say"	1964
1405	The Rivieras	"Rip It Up" / "Whole Lotta Shakin'"	1964
1406	The Rivieras	"Let's Go to Hawaii" / "Lakeview Lane"	1965
1407	The Rivieras	"Somebody New" / "Somebody Asked Me"	Sep. 1965
1408	The Sigma Five	"Comin' Down" / "Pop Top"	1965/1966
LP 701	The Rivieras	Campus Party	1964
