= Childhood's End (album) =

Studio album by Ulver
- Released: 28 May 2012
- Recorded: Autumn 2008 and Summer 2011 at Crystal Canyon Studios, Oslo, Norway
- Genre: Art rock; psychedelic rock
- Length: 53:52
- Label: Kscope
- Producer: Ulver

Ulver chronology
The Norwegian National Opera (2011)	Childhood's End (2012)	Live at Roadburn (2012)

Ulver studio album chronology
Wars of the Roses (2011)	Childhood's End (2012)	Messe I.X–VI.X (2013)

Childhood's End (subtitled Lost & Found from the Age of Aquarius) is a compilation album of cover songs by Norwegian experimental collective Ulver. Produced by Ulver, the album was recorded live in Crystal Canyon Studios, Oslo, over two sessions, in autumn 2008 and summer 2011, and issued in May 2012 on Jester Records under exclusive license to Kscope.

The album is a collection of covers of "60s psychedelic chestnuts", a reinterpretation of mostly obscure 1960s psychedelia, intended by Ulver as a reflection on lost innocence.

In a Kscope video interview, Kristoffer Rygg commented, "I grew up with parents who were still listening to music from the time, so it informed my childhood, and it has become an ever increasing geeky sort of fetish since then", adding, "[M]y feeling is that most people's knowledge sort of limits itself to The Doors. The Doors were cool, but there was so much else going on… in the underground, records that got lost and didn't get as much recognition as they deserved in my opinion. We wish to be ambassadors for things that we love and we sort of hope that we can open some gates with the record."

The album includes versions of songs by The Pretty Things, The Byrds, Bonniwell's Music Machine, We the People, Jefferson Airplane, Gandalf, The Electric Prunes, The 13th Floor Elevators, The Troggs, The Left Banke, The Beau Brummels, Common People, Music Emporium, Curt Boettcher, The Fleur de Lys, and The United States of America.

The cover features a photograph by Hoang Van Danh of Phan Thi Kim Phuc fleeing a napalm attack by the Republic of Vietnam Air Force in 1972.

A music video for "Magic Hollow", directed by Justin Oakey, was released in April 2012.

== Background ==
Frontman Kristoffer Rygg explained that Childhood's End was "one of those projects I'd been meaning to do for some time. In my 20s I found myself coming up short with new things to like. It wasn't until the late '90s when I discovered a true fascination with psychedelic music, and even prog. That was when '60s and '70s music really took hold, and I've been more and more into it ever since. I listen to a lot more stuff from that era than I do modern music." Rygg spent considerable time "digging around" to find the right songs to cover and explained that "[t]here's a missionary aspect to all this too, to make an exclamation mark to the fact that there are fucking golden nuggets before your Black Sabbaths."

Rygg describes the album as connected to the themes of Ulver's 1998 album Themes from William Blake's The Marriage of Heaven and Hell, in that both explore "the same idea of shattered illusions and a lost childhood". He elaborated this by explaining that the 1960s were "sort of a cultural movement... that became disillusioned and quite dark. I was thinking of a kind of Blakean strain, a loss of innocence. I've always thought that this particular era and the spirituality of it was very childlike in many ways. Suddenly there was Altamont and Charles Manson, cocaine and heroin, then Watergate later".

The album was recorded in two sessions. The first, in autumn 2008, featured Lars Pedersen on drums. For the second session, in summer 2011, Tomas Pettersen drummed.

== Reception ==
Professional ratings
Review scores
Source	Rating
About.com	4/5 stars
Exclaim!	Favourable
The New York Times	Favourable
Rolling Stone	4/5 stars
Sound and Vision	4/5 stars
Record Collector	3/5 stars

The album received generally favourable reviews.

Ben Ratliffe, writing for The New York Times, praised Childhood's End for its treatment of the original music, commenting that "these cover versions reward the ambition of the original songs, draping them with stateliness". Placing the album in the context of Ulver's discography, Ratliffe noted that Childhood's End is "the most straight-ahead Ulver record ever, but still strange".

Natalie Zina Walschots wrote similarly in Exclaim!, describing the album as "deceptively simple", featuring an "achingly familiar" set of songs that, "rather than evoking fondness or nostalgia, conjure the unsettling shadow versions of themselves". David Fricke, with Rolling Stone magazine, wrote that the album "is more than hip-covers fun" that "darken[s] the apocalypse in acid-Sixties relics".

Stating that Ulver's choice of covers possesses a kinship with the band's own creative ambitions, Sound and Vision's Michael Berk observed that Childhood's End "is not so much a departure as a literature review; drawing the connections between Ulver's own experimentalism and the psych bands who, possibly without a clear idea of what they were doing, pushed the boundaries of rock in the '60s further than any of their mainstream contemporaries".

Dayal Patterson, writing for Record Collector, said "Ulver are nothing if not unpredictable and ever-evolving. With a contemporary edge that occasionally removes the furry ambiguities of the originals and replaces them with a dark sense of the epic, the album bears enough of Ulver's touch (particularly thanks to founder Kristoffer Rygg's vocals), meaning that this should be palatable for fans of the band new to garage and psychedelic music. Others will find this rewarding – if perhaps a little unnecessary – and there's little questioning the delivery or attention to detail here. Probably not at the top of the wish list for most followers of the group, but a pretty successful deviation nonetheless."

== Track listing ==
No.	Title	Writer(s)	Length
1.	"Bracelets of Fingers" (The Pretty Things cover)	Dick Taylor, Phil May, Wally Walter	4:12
2.	"Everybody's Been Burned" (The Byrds cover)	David Crosby	3:25
3.	"The Trap" (Bonniwell's Music Machine cover)	Sean Bonniwell	2:33
4.	"In the Past" (We the People cover)	Wayne Proctor	2:54
5.	"Today" (Jefferson Airplane cover)	Marty Balin, Paul Kantner	3:20
6.	"Can You Travel in the Dark Alone?" (Gandalf cover)	Peter Sando	4:02
7.	"I Had Too Much to Dream (Last Night)" (The Electric Prunes cover)	Annette Tucker, Nancie Mantz	2:54
8.	"Street Song" (The 13th Floor Elevators cover)	Stacy Sutherland	5:14
9.	"66-5-4-3-2-1" (The Troggs cover)	Reg Presley	3:23
10.	"Dark Is the Bark" (The Left Banke cover)	George Cameron, Steve Martin Caro, Tom Finn	4:03
11.	"Magic Hollow" (The Beau Brummels cover)	Ron Elliott, Sal Valentino	3:15
12.	"Soon There'll Be Thunder" (Common People cover)	Denny Robinett, Jerrald Robinett	2:27
13.	"Velvet Sunsets" (Music Emporium cover)	William Cosby, Thom Wade	2:44
14.	"Lament of the Astral Cowboy" (Curt Boettcher cover)	Curt Boettcher	2:14
15.	"I Can See the Light" (The Fleur de Lys cover)	Bryn Haworth, Gordon Haskell	3:14
16.	"Where Is Yesterday" (The United States of America cover)	Dorothy Moskowitz, Ed Bogas, Gordon Marron	3:58
Total length:			53:52

== Personnel ==
Ulver

- Kristoffer Rygg — vocals, programming, producer
- Tore Ylwizaker — keyboards, programming, producer
- Jørn H. Sværen — miscellaneous, producer
- Daniel O'Sullivan — guitar, bass, keyboards, producer

Additional Musicians

- Drums — Tomas Pettersen on 1, 3, 4, 6, 8, 9, 12, 14, 16
- Drums — Lars Pedersen on 2, 5, 7, 10, 15
- Additional guitar effects — Alexander Kloster-Jensen on 2
- Additional electric guitar — Alexander Kloster-Jensen on 16
- Electric Bass — Lars Christian Folkvord on 2
- Electric Guitar — Espen Jørgensen on 2, 5, 10, 15
- Acoustic Guitar — Espen Jørgensen on 5, 10
- Electric Bass – Mats Engen on 3-7, 9-16
- Backing Vocals — Mats Engen on 7, 15
- Female Voice — Sisi Sumbundu on 7
- Tambourine — Anders Møller on 8
- Shaker — Anders Møller on 8, 9
- Acoustic Guitar, Electric Guitar — Trond Mjøen on 11
- Congas — Anders Møller on 11
- Electronic Effects — Ole Alexander Halstensgård on 12, 13, 16
- Electric Guitar — Trond Mjøen on 13
- Female Voice — Ingvild Langgård on 13

Other Credits

- Design — Trine + Kim Design Studio
- Mastered by — Jaime Gomez Arellano
- Mixed by — Anders Møller
- Photography by — Hoang Van Danh
