= The Sentinals =

Band

- Also known as: The Sentinel Six
- Origin: San Luis Obispo, California
- Genres: Surf
- Years active: 1961–1965
- Labels: Del-Fi, ERA, Westco
- Past members: John Barbata; Ron Gornell; Peter Graham; Kenny Hinkle; Bobby Holmquist; Norman Knowles; Lee Michaels; Tommy Nuñes; Ronnie Page; Ben Trout; Harry Sackrider; Doug Scott; Gary Winburne

The Sentinals were a surf rock band from San Luis Obispo, California (1961–1965). The band is notable for a Latino influence in some works, such as "Latin'ia" (1962). Notable band members included Tommy Nuñes, drummer John Barbata (later of The Turtles and Jefferson Starship) and Lee Michaels (then known as Michael Olsen) on keyboards.

== Background ==
Even though a surf group, they added an appealing Latin accent to their music. According to band member John Barbata, as mentioned in Craig Fenton's Take Me to a Circus Tent: The Jefferson Airplane Flight Manual, the group was actually rhythm and Blues.

== Career ==
=== 1960s ===
In the summer of 1962, the group toured the country and opened for bands including The Coasters and The Righteous Brothers. Also that year, through Norman Knowles, the group came across Tony Hilder, whose company Anthony Music would later become involved in legal action with Del-Fi records, slapping the label with a $122,000 lawsuit as a result of royalties not being paid. This was relating to an alleged agreement for the masters of albums by The Sentinels, The Centurians, Dave Myers and the Surftones, etc.

In 1963 the band was featured in the March 16 issue of Central Coast Living section of The Tribune. Kenny Hinkle was pictured on the cover. Also that year, their Big Surf album was released on the Del-Fi label.

According to Robert J. Dalley's book Surfin' Guitars: Instrumental Surf Bands of the Sixties, the 1965 line up consisted of John Barbata, Ron Gornell, Kenny Hinkle, Norman Knowles, and Tommy Nuñes.

=== 1970s to 1980s ===
In August 1984, they got together and played at the San Luis Obispo Officer's Club. This live reunion was for their twenty-year class reunion.

=== 1990s to present ===
In 1996, Del-Fi released the Big Surf Hits various artists compilation album, featuring their track "Big Surf". Other artists on the album were The Impacts, Dave Myers and The Surftones and The Lively Ones.

== Members ==
- John Barbata: drums, 1961–66
- Ron Gornell: organ, 1965–66
- Peter Graham: guitar, 1961–62
- Kenny Hinkle: vocals & bass, 1962–66
- Bobby Holmquist: saxophone, 1961–64
- Norman Knowles: saxophone, 1963–66
- Lee Michaels (Michael Olsen): organ, vocals, 1966
- Tommy Nuñes: guitar 1961–66
- Ronnie Page: vocals, 1966
- Ben Trout: bass, 1962–64
- Harry Sackrider: guitar, 1962–64
- Doug Scott: drums
- Gary Winburne: bass, 1961–62,

== Discography ==
Singles
| Title | Release info | Year | Notes |
|---|---|---|---|
| "Roughshod" / "Copy Cat Walk" | Admiral 900 | 1961 | |
| "Latin'ia" / "Tor-Chula" | WCEB 23 | 1962 | |
| "Latin'ia" / "Tor-Chula" | ERA 3082 | 1962 | |
| "Christmas Eve" / "Latin Soul" | ERA 3097 | 1962 | |
| "Big Surf" / "Sunset Beach" | Del-Fi 4197 | 1963 | |
| "Infinity" / "Encinada" | ERA 3117 | 1963 | (as The Sentinel Six) |
| "The Bee" / "Over You" | Point 5100 | 1964 | |
| "Blue Booze" / "Bony Maronie" | Point 5101 | 1964 | |
| "Hit The Road" / "I've Been Blue" | Westco WC 12 | 1964 | |
| "Hit The Road" / "Tell Me" | Westco WC 14 | 1964 | |
| "Tor-Chula" / " Latin'ia" | Sundazed S 208 | 2010 | |

Albums (LP)
| Title | Release info | Year | Notes |
|---|---|---|---|
| Big Surf! | Del-Fi Records DFLP 1232 | 1963 | Stereo version DFST 1232 |
| Surfer Girl | Del-Fi Records DFLP 1241 | 1963 | Stereo version DFST 1241 |
| Vegas Go Go | Sutton SSU 338 | 1964 | |
| Big Surf | Del-Fi Records DFLP 1232 | 1996 | reissue |
| Surfer Girl | Del-Fi Records DFLP 1241 | 1996 | |
| Big Surf! | Rumble Records RUM 2011086 | 2014 | reissue |

Albums (CD)
| Title | Release info | Year | Notes |
|---|---|---|---|
| Big Surf | Del-Fi Records DFCD 71232-2 | 1994 | reissue |
| Surfer Girl | Del-Fi Records DFCD 71241-2 | 1996 | reissue |
