= Live at Roadburn (Ulver album) =

Live album by Ulver
- Released: 12 April 2013
- Recorded: 12 April 2012
- Venue: 013, Tilburg, the Netherlands
- Genre: Art rock, psychedelic rock
- Length: 53:52
- Label: Roadburn Records
- Producer: Ulver

Ulver chronology
Childhood's End (2012)	Live at Roadburn (2013)	Messe I.X–VI.X (2013)

Live at Roadburn (subtitled Eulogy for the Late Sixties) is a live album by Norwegian experimental collective Ulver. Produced by Ulver, the album was recorded at the Roadburn Festival in Tilburg, Netherlands on 12 April 2012 and issued in April 2013 via Roadburn Records.

Rygg commented on the release, "This was our pre-release party for the commemorative album Childhood's End, which we had just sewn up when we received the invitation from Roadburn. A one-shot psychedelic blowout or perhaps some sort of karaoke for our vestigial veterans; felt quite invigorating after the doom and gloom of the last few years. We gathered the guys who were involved in the album sessions and rehearsed the songs a couple of days before travelling to Tilburg. Not in total control, but that’s the spirit. Haywire lycanthropy."

Commenting on Ulver's performance at Roadburn Festival, Jamie Thomson, writing for The Quietus, said, "I was placing a lot of faith in Ulver but ultimately I was to be disappointed. They were playing set of '60s psyche covers – and while the band themselves had a pretty good stab at recreating the sounds of the time, the alchemical tools to make it something special seemed just out of frontman Kristoffer Rygg's reach. Ulver's restless reinvention is rarely less than compelling, so it was unusual to see their ambitions outstrip their ability."

== Track listing ==
No.	Title	Writer(s)	Length
1.	"Bracelets of Fingers" (The Pretty Things cover)	Dick Taylor, Phil May, Wally Walter	4:49
2.	"In the Past" (We the People cover)	Wayne Proctor	3:03
3.	"Can You Travel in the Dark Alone?" (Gandalf cover)	Peter Sando	5:00
4.	"Soon There'll Be Thunder" (Common People cover)	Denny, Jerrald Robinett	2:27
5.	"Today" (Jefferson Airplane cover)	Marty Balin, Paul Kantner	3:50
6.	"Velvet Sunsets" (Music Emporium cover)	William Cosby, Thom Wade	4:04
7.	"Street Song" (The 13th Floor Elevators cover)	Stacy Sutherland	5:57
8.	"66-5-4-3-2-1" (The Troggs cover)	Reg Presley	3:48
9.	"I Had Too Much to Dream (Last Night)" (The Electric Prunes cover)	Annette Tucker, Nancie Mantz	3:27
10.	"Magic Hollow" (The Beau Brummels cover)	Ron Elliott, Sal Valentino	3:27
11.	"Impromptu Performance (Dedicated to Can)"		11:19

== Personnel ==
Live band

- Drums – Tomas Pettersen
- Electric bass – Mats Engen
- Electric guitar – Alexander Kloster-Jensen, Trond Mjøen
- Organ, Mellotron, electric piano – Daniel O'Sullivan
- Percussion – Anders Møller
- Voice, guitar – Daniel O'Sullivan (tracks: 7)
- Voice, effects, percussion – Kristoffer Rygg

Other credits

- Cover – Trine + Kim Design Studio
- Engineer (FOH) – Chris Fullard, Kristin Bøyesen
- Mastering – Jaime Gomez Arellano
- Mixing – Anders Møller
- Photography – Christian Westgeest, Paul Verhagen
- Producer – Marcel van de Vondervoort, Robert de Lorijn
- Recording – Danny Gras, Kristian Vloet
