= Speed Label =

- Parent company: Morly Grey Publishing
- Founded: 1969
- Founder: Paul Cassidy, Mark Roller, Tim Roller, Randy Byron
- Distributor: Sundazed Music
- Genre: Garage rock, progressive rock, psychedelic rock
- Country of origin: U.S.
- Location: Las Vegas, Nevada
- Official website: www.speedlabel.com

Speed Label is the record company of Morly Grey. Started in 1969 by Paul Cassidy, Randy Byron and Mark and Tim Roller. Their first release was "Sleepy Softness" and "Yas" on 45 rpm. In 1972 they released their first album (originally titled "The First Supper") but later changed to "The Only Truth" on the (unpublished) Starshine Records. After thirty years of modest success through bootlegs of the album by various labels in several countries, Morly Grey resurrected the original Speed Label in 2005. In 2009 the label negotiated with Sundazed Music to remaster and reissue The Only Truth with previously unreleased bonus tracks.

== History ==
Started in 1969 in Alliance, Ohio by Morly Grey for their first 45 rpm single "Yas/Sleepy Softness". In 1972 the label entered into a distribution agreement with Morly Grey's manager Floyd Philips to distribute their first album LP "The Only Truth", and some singles, on his Starshine Records Label (which Morly Grey produced and self-published). In 1973 the band released the LP " The Roller Bros.Band " on their subsidiary vanity label "RBB Records". Released " The Only Truth " on CD in 2005 and "The First Supper" CD Single in 2008. In 2009 signed an exclusive contract for the remastering and reissuing of "The Only Truth" with Sundazed Music. In 2009 the label is remastering all previously unreleased material for possible future releases.

== Move to Las Vegas ==
In 2005 Speed Label reorganized under Paul Cassidy's brother, Rick, in Las Vegas, NV. Rick also runs the publishing company ( Morly Grey Publishing ASCAP ). The surviving owners ( Mark and Tim Roller ) still remain in Alliance, Ohio.

== Discography ==
=== Albums ===
- The Roller Bros.Band , LP, RBB Records/Speed Label, Morly Grey (1973)
- The Only Truth , CD, Speed Label, Morly Grey (2005)

=== Singles ===
- "Yas/Sleepy Softness" 45 rpm, Speed Label, Morly Grey (1969)
- "The First Supper" ( Be Your King/I'll Space You ) CD Single, Speed Label, Morly Grey (2005)

=== Unreleased ===
- "RAW" ( Live Recordings ), Morly Grey (1973)
- "RAW" ( Live Music Video ), Morly Grey (1973)
- "Reunion" ( Studio Recordings ), Morly Grey (1995–1997)
