= The Coach House =

The Coach House may refer to:

- The Coach House, Selbourne Drive, Douglas, Isle of Man, one of Isle of Man's Registered Buildings
- The Coach House (San Juan Capistrano, California), a music and recording venue

== See also ==
- Coach house, an outbuilding for horse-drawn carriages
