= Starshine =

Starshine may refer to:

- STARSHINE, acronym for Student Tracked Atmospheric Research Satellite Heuristic International Networking Experiment, a series of three artificial satellites
- Starshine (comics), name of two fictional American comic book characters appearing in Marvel Universe
- Starshine Records, a late 1960s, now defunct independent record label
- The almost imperceptible glow created by a night sky full of bright stars on a clear, moonless night. Usually only seen far from any urban areas. It is also called Starlight.
- "Starshine", a song by Gorillaz from their album Gorillaz
- "Starshine" (Stevie Nicks song), 2014
