= The Pyramids Play the Original Penetration! =

Studio album by The Pyramids
- Released: 1964
- Genre: Surf music
- Label: Best Records BR 16501
- Producer: John Hodge

The Pyramids Play the Original Penetration! was a charting album for The Pyramids in 1964. It contained their surf music track "Penetration” as well as a minor hit "Here Comes Marsha".

== Background ==
The album contained the hit "Penetration" which spent a total of ten weeks in the charts, peaking at #18 on the week of April 4, 1964. There was also some small success with the B-side, "Here Comes Marsha," which was a regional hit in Texas thanks to deejays playing that side.

By February 22, 1964, the album was out, released on Best BR 16501 with Billboard mentioning "Penetration" as receiving singles attention, and "Louie Louie", "Out of Limits" and "Road Runnah" as other danceable tunes. The stereo version was released on BRS 36501.

On the Best Records BR 16501 release, two of the album's tracks are not by the Pyramids. "Road Runnah" is by the Road Runners and "Out of Limits" is by the Marketts.

The album was re-released in 1982 on What Records? W12-2404.

== Chart performance ==
By March 7, the album was listed in the Breakout albums New Action LPs section. This was a section that showed the non-charting albums which were getting major attention by dealers in major markets. By March 28, it was in the Billboard Top LPs chart at #121, having moved up 9 notches from the previous week's position of 130. By April 4, it was at #119. On the 11th of April it was at its fifth week in the chart and had moved down to #120. In the same week, it was also at its eighth week in the Music Vendor chart at 118, having moved down 6 notches from the previous week's position of 112. Also that week their single "Penetration" was at 59, having moved down eleven notches from the previous week's position of 48.

== Track listing ==
The Pyramids Play the Original Penetration!Best Records LPM 1001Track listing
No	Title	Time	Notes
A1	"Penetration"	1:50	
A2	"Louie Louie"	1:55	
A3	"Paul"	2:13	
A4	"Long Tall Texan"	2:40	
A5	"Koko Joe"	2:30	
A6	"Walkin' The Dog"	2:10	
B1	"Out of Limits"	2:08	
B2	"Here Comes Marsha"	1:50	
B3	"Pyramid Stomp"	2:05	
B4	"Do The Slauson"	2:35	
B5	"Everybody"	1:52	
B6	"Sticks And Skins"	2:05	

(LPM 101 Re-released in 1982 on What Records? W12-2404)

The Pyramids Play the Original Penetration!Best Records BR 16501Track listing
No	Act	Title	Composer	Time
A1	The Pyramids	"Penetration"	Steve Leonard	
A2	The Pyramids	"Louie Louie"	R. Berry	
A3	The Pyramids	"Paul"	Alfred Mercier	
A4	The Pyramids	"Long Tall Texan"	H. Stegelecki	
A5	The Pyramids	"Koko Joe"	Scott Christy	
A6	The Road Runners	"Road Runnah"	Buckles	
B1	The Marketts	"Out of Limits"	Michael Z. Gordon	
B2	The Pyramids	"Here Comes Marsha"	W. Glover	
B3	The Pyramids	"Pyramid Stomp"	Alfred Mercier	
B4	The Pyramids	"Do The Slauson"	Krasnow, Brooks, Ashe, Sepe	
B5	The Pyramids	"Everybody"	T. Roe	
B6	The Pyramids	"Sticks And Skins"	R. McMullen	

(Stereo release on BRS 36501)
