= Six Pak =

Single by The Revels
- B-side: "Good Grief"
- Released: 1959
- Venue: The Queen's Court
- Genre: Surf
- Length: 1:50
- Label: Lynn 1302
- Songwriter: The Revels

The Revels singles chronology
"Six Pak" (1959)	"Church Key" (1960)

"Six Pak" is a hit for The Revels in 1959. This was their first release.

== Background ==
It was composed by Norman Knowles and other members of The Revels, Sam Eddy, Brian England, Dan Darnold and Jim Macrae. It was released bw "Good Grief" on Lyn 1302 in October, 1959. Knowles had been inspired by Dan Darnold's reputation for drinking a beer in just four seconds. The track had party sound effects that would be used by The Revels in their other recordings. It became a hit in California.

It was also released on Swingin' 620 in 1960. An alternative take of the track is featured on the Sundazed Music 1994 CD compilation, Intoxica! The Best Of The Revels.

== Releases ==
=== Singles ===
- "Six Pak" / "Good Grief" - Lynn 1302 - 1959
- "Six Pak / "Good Grief" - Swingin' 620 - 1960

=== Compilations ===
- The Revels - Intoxica!!! The Best of the Revels
- Various artists - Hot Rockin' Instrumentals - Collector Records CLCD 4430
