= The Only Truth =

The Only Truth may refer to:

- "The Only Truth" (song), a 1984 song by Paul Haig
- The Only Truth (album), a 1972 album by Morly Grey
