= Penetration (instrumental) =

Single by The Pyramids

from the album The Pyramids Play The Original Penetration!
- B-side: "Here Comes Marsha"
- Released: December 1963
- Genre: Surf rock
- Length: 1:50
- Label: Best 13002
- Songwriter: S. Leonard
- Producer: John Hodge

The Pyramids singles chronology
"Here Comes Marsha" (1963)	"Penetration" (1963)	"Midnight Run" (1964)

"Penetration" was an instrumental hit for the surf band The Pyramids in 1964.

== Background ==
The song has been described as a pivotal surf-instro anthem. In Duane Cozzen's book, Surf & Hot Rod Music of the 60's: Collectors Quick Reference, it says that "Penetration" is believed to be the last major surf instrumental song.

On the day of the recording session, Will Glover was in the studio and was not "feeling it". So he decided to go across the road to have a bite to eat and a soft drink. On his way back to the studio, he bumped into two members of The Beach Boys, Brian Wilson and Mike Love. The Beach Boys had recorded in the same studio. He spoke to them, forgetting about his group's recording session. By the time he returned to the studio, Skip Mercier had recorded his guitar part. However, Glover did sing on the other song contained on the 45. "Here Comes Marsha", which was written by Glover, was meant to be the A-side but a DJ in Riverside played the B-side "Penetration" and caused it to be a hit.

The Way Back Attack website has "Penetration" at #18 in the TOP 100 SURF SONGS 1959–1969 list.

== Chart performance ==
Spending a total of ten weeks in the charts, it peaked at #18 in the week of April 4, 1964.

The B-side of the record, "Here Comes Marsha", was a regional hit in Texas thanks to DJs playing that side.

Chart (1964)	Peak position
US Billboard Hot 100	18
