= Larry Brown (musician) =

American songwriter

- Also known as: Larry H. Brown
- Born: Lawrence Howard Brown; 1947 (age 78–79)
- Occupations: Musician, composer, recording engineer
- Instrument: Drums
- Website: larrybrown440.net

Larry Brown (born 1947) is an American musician, composer, and recording engineer.

== Background ==
=== 1960s ===
In the 1960s, he started out playing drums in various bands, including surf music bands. During the late 1960s to the 1970s, he either provided or helped provide music for a number of exploitation films which include biker cult classics such as The Wild Angels, The Glory Stompers, The Angry Breed and Mary Jane. In 1965, Brown was the drummer for Davie Allan who provided the music for many biker films in the 1960s, Larry wrote some of his earliest pieces of film music for Roger Corman's The Wild Angels. . Around the late-60s, Brown left the Arrows to become their producer and also produced an album for Dave Myers, released as the Dave Myers Effect, Greatest Racing Themes. It was later released on the Carole label in 1968. During the late 60s he was the producer, engineer and member of a Pop-Psych group called The Moon made up of lead singer and keyboardist Matthew Moore, guitarist David Marks, bassist Andrew Bennett aka Drew Bennett and later David Jackson. The group released three singles and a couple of albums on the Imperial Records label. During this period of time Brown designed and built his first recording studio, Continental Sound for Mike Curb, Continental Sound later became the world-famous Producers Workshop, where Pink Floyd, Steely Dan, Neil Diamond and many others have recorded their hits. Continental Sound was also the studio where Brown was the engineer for Sheffield Labs' first direct-to-disc albums.

=== 1970s ===
During the early 1970s he and Jerry Styner collarborated and had an album Orbit III released on the Beverly Hills record label. A few years later Brown and Styner provided the music for the 1975 film Mitchell that starred Joe Don Baker. As a musician he toured with "The 5th Dimension" Jose Feliciano, Helen Reddy, Tompall and the Glaser Brothers, Glenn Yarbrough & The Limeliters, Andy Williams, and Michel Legrand. As a recording engineer he worked with many acts, including Quicksilver Messenger Service, Sam Moore, Andy Williams, OC Smith, Paul Anka, Rod McKuen, Solomon Burke and Harry Nilsson. During this period Brown also continued drumming and became a busy studio musician around Los Angeles playing on many records, films and TV shows including The Rockford Files, Alias Smith and Jones and recording acts Donovan, Paul Williams, Stephen Bishop and Kenny Rogers. Although Brown started as Andy Williams's drummer he later was the producer for two of Andy's Columbia albums, "Christmas Present" for which he also wrote the title song and "Andy." In the late 1970s while working as a drummer and engineer Brown met music and film producer Spencer Proffer, with whom he built his second recording studio, The Pasha Music House. While at Pasha Brown worked as a producer and chief engineer recording artists Eddie Money, Al Jarreau, Billy Thorpe, England Dan & John Ford Coley, Firefall, Allan Clarke, The Outlaws, Ted Nugent, and The Plimsouls. Pasha was the studio where Quiet Riot recorded their multi platinum album Metal Health.

=== 1980s ===
In the early 1980s Brown left Pasha, remaining close friends with Proffer to pursue his career as a producer, film composer and to build his own personal use recording studio 440 Sound. He re-teamed up with Billy Thorpe to compose the music for the TV series War of the Worlds, also at 440 Sound Brown recorded the music for Teenage Mutant Ninja Turtles and The California Raisin Show with composer Dennis Brown and Chuck Lorre, this led to him co-composing music with Dennis on the animated series James Bond Jr., The New Adventures of Speed Racer and The Toxic Crusaders. In 1988 Brown was the mixing engineer for the TV special "Kenny, Dolly and Willie" for which he won the prime-time Emmy for outstanding mixing for a musical or variety special. On the record side he produced, arranged and engineered Bryan Duncan's Whistlin' in the Dark album. as well as "Strong Medicine", "Have Yourself Committed", "Holy Rollin' and Brown produced and engineered Sheffield Lab Direct to Disc "Tower of Power Direct".

=== 1990 ===
In the 1990s Larry decided to pursue his composing career full-time. He was the composer for 780 episodes of Real Stories of the Highway Patrol, and 22 episodes of Stephen J. Cannell's Cobra, teaming again with supervising music producer Spencer Proffer. Also, in the 1990s Brown scored episodes of Hanna-Barbera's The New Adventures of Jonny Quest for which he received an Emmy nomination for Music Direction and Composition. Brown continued his career with Kenny Rogers scoring the music for Rio Diablo, McShaye and The Gambler V and served as music director for Kenny's CBS special "Keep Christmas with You". In 1990's Brown met Alex Paen and composed the music for Emergency Call, this led to a long-lasting business relationship including being composer for the TV reality series "Animal Rescue" that first aired in 1999 and is still airing weekly in 2025. In the late 1990s Brown had a successful run composing music for Showtime features including the films Triplecross, Gang in Blue, Elvis Meets Nixon, Mr. Music and The Wall. Also, during this time Brown scored the indie films Food for the Heart, The Women of Spring Break, The Christmas Stallion and Fait Accompli.

=== 2000 ===
Brown has kept busy throughout the 2000s writing music for TV and Film. Reality TV shows he composes for include The Amazing Race, Dog Tales, Missing, Real Green, EA Game Time, Animal Rescue, Celebrity Page, Dragonfly TV and My Ghost Stories. He provided the music for the documentaries I Hope You Dance: The Power and Spirit of Song released in 2015., Brown also composed the original music for the documentaries Unsung Heroes, the Emmy winning Our People Our Culture Our History, For Love Of Liberty and As Seen Through These Eyes, these both won Gold Medals For Excellence, Best Impact Of Music In A Documentary Film, Director's Choice at the Park City Film Festival, Love Of Liberty also earned Larry a MPSE Golden Real nomination for his music editing. In 2023 Brown scored Steve Binder's Elvis documentary Rediscovering Elvis the '68 Comeback. Other films Brown scored include And They're Off, Space Warriors, Hard Four, Silent Partner, Don't Tell, Ballad of the Nightingale, Deadly Little Secrets and Cutaway. Brown also wrote the score for the HBO animated specials, Mother Goose: A Rappin' and Rhymin' Special and The Sissy Duckling, he was lead composer for the long running HBO series ''Happily Ever After'' and also composer for Stan Lee Presents ''The Condor''.

== Discography ==
- Mike Curb and Larry Brown – Mary Jane Original Soundtrack from the American International Picture "Mary Jane" - Sidewalk DT-5911 - (1968)
- Jerry Styner and Larry Brown – Orbit III - Beverly Hills BHS 38 - (1971)
