= California Sun =

1960 song recorded by Joe Jones

Single by Joe Jones
- B-side: "Please Don't Talk About Me When I'm Gone"
- Released: 1960
- Length: 2:21
- Label: Roulette
- Songwriter: Henry Glover

Joe Jones singles chronology
"You Talk Too Much" (1960)	"California Sun" (1960)	"(I've Got a) Uh Uh Wife" (1961)

"California Sun" is a rock song written by Henry Glover when employed by Roulette Records. It has been recorded and released by various artists, the most successful by the band The Rivieras in 1963.

== Joe Jones version ==
It was first recorded by American rhythm and blues singer Joe Jones. Glover is credited on the original 45 rpm single as the sole songwriter, although Roulette Records owner Morris Levy's name has since been added. In 1961, Roulette issued the song with "Please Don't Talk About Me When I'm Gone" as the B-side. The single reached number 89 on Billboard's Hot 100.

== The Rivieras version ==
"California Sun"

Single by The Rivieras

from the album Let's Have a Party
- B-side: "H.B. Goose Step"
- Released: December 1963
- Recorded: 1963
- Genre: Rock and roll
- Length: 2:23
- Label: Riviera
- Songwriter: Henry Glover

The Rivieras singles chronology
"Played On" (1963)	"California Sun" (1963)	"Little Donna" (1964)

Official audio
- "California Sun" on YouTube

The most successful was a surfer-rock version of the song released by the Rivieras in 1963 and became the group's biggest hit in their short career. This song was the result of their first recording session at Chicago's Columbia Recording Studios in 1963, organised by manager Bill Dobslaw. The lineup for this session included Marty Fortson on vocals and rhythm guitar, Joe Pennell on lead guitar, Doug Gean on bass guitar, Otto Nuss on Vox Continental organ, and Paul Dennert on drums. The original single cut from this session included the song "Played On" as the A-side, with "California Sun" as the B-side and was released on Dobslaw's Riviera label in 1963. DJ Art Roberts ensured that the "California Sun" side saw significant airplay on WLS. In response to the growing success, Dobslaw got the band a national distribution deal with USA Records, and the song was adequately distributed with "H.B. Goose Step" as the B-side.

The song entered the charts on January 25, 1964, peaking at number five on the US Billboard Hot 100 chart. It remained on the charts for 10 weeks. The song was further hailed as the last American rock and roll hit before the British Invasion. In Canada it was number 3 for 3 weeks, kept out of the top 2 spots by The Beatles. Shortly after the song's release, the band experienced internal problems as Fortson and Pennell enlisted in the Marines, in addition to various lineup changes afterwards. A re-recording of the song with new lyrics, titled "Arizona Sun" was recorded in 1964, but not released until 2000 on the compilation Let's Stomp with The Rivieras! Unissued 1964 Recordings. "California Sun" was eventually featured on the band's debut album Let's Have a Party. A later version was released later that year as "California Sun '65" on their second and final album, Campus Party.

The Rivieras version was used in the 1987 movie Good Morning, Vietnam, as well as on its soundtrack album. It was also featured in the 1991 biopic The Doors. It was one of many California-related songs played throughout "Sunshine Plaza" in the original Disney California Adventure.

=== Chart history ===
Chart (1964)	Peak position
Canada (CHUM Hit Parade)	3
Germany	15
New Zealand (Lever Hit Parade)	6
U.S. Billboard Hot 100	5

== Ramones version ==
"California Sun"

Song by Ramones

from the album Leave Home
- A-side: "I Wanna Be Your Boyfriend"
- Released: January 1977
- Recorded: October 1976
- Genre: Punk rock
- Length: 1:58
- Label: Sire
- Songwriter: Henry Glover
- Producers: Tony Bongiovi, Tommy Ramone

The Ramones first used a live version of the song as the B-side to the "I Wanna Be Your Boyfriend" single released in 1976.

A studio version of the song was recorded by the band for their 1977 Leave Home album, and contains one of Johnny Ramone's rare recorded guitar solos This version was also used in their 1979 Rock 'n' Roll High School motion picture and the live-album It's Alive. This version is on various compilations, including All the Stuff (And More!) Volume 1 and Hey Ho! Let's Go: The Anthology.

The Ramones cover was also used in Jackass: The Movie (and on the soundtrack album) and in The X-Files season 11 episode This.

== Other notable versions ==
- Annette Funicello covered it in 1963.
- The Crickets recorded their version for their LP of the same name in 1964 (Liberty LRP 3351 / LST 7351).
- The New York City rock band the Dictators included their own cover of the song on their 1975 Go Girl Crazy! debut album.
- Brendan Bowyer recorded "California Sun" as a B-side for his 1964 single "Bless You for Being an Angel", misspelled as "Californian Sun" on the record label.
- Tommy James & the Shondells recorded a cover of the song for their 1967 album, I Think We're Alone Now.
- Gyllene Tider covered the song in Swedish in 1981, with the title "Tylö Sun".
- The song was covered by Frankie Avalon in the 1987 movie, Back to the Beach.
- Dave Alvin performed the song backed by Los Straitjackets on the 2001 album Sing Along With Los Straitjackets.
- English band Palma Violets covered it as the B-side of their single "We Found Love".
- A version by Swedish band Ola & the Janglers was released in 1970 (sung in English).
- Dick Dale recorded his version of the song on the album Unknown Territory for HighTone Records in 1994.
- A version of this song was covered by Brian Wilson for the movie Curious George 2: Follow That Monkey!.
- Mike Love released his version on his 2019 album 12 Sides of Summer.
- Bill Haley and His Comets recorded a version with localised lyrics for the Mexican label Orfeon Records for the 1966 album Whiskey a Go Go. This version was released with the modified title, "Baja California Sun".
- On February 4, 2026, pop-punk group The Linda Lindas released a cover of “California Sun” as a single.
- Portuguese punk band Peste & Sida recorded a version in Portuguese titled "Sol da Caparica" for their 1989 album Portem-se Bem. It was one of the band's most famous hits.
