= Let's Have a Party (Rivieras album) =

Studio album by The Rivieras
- Released: 1964
- Recorded: July 1963 – February 1964
- Studio: Columbia Recording, Chicago
- Genre: Rock 'n' roll, garage rock
- Length: 27:11
- Label: USA
- Producer: Bill Dobslaw

The Rivieras chronology
Let's Have a Party (1964)	Campus Party (1965)

Singles from Let's Have a Party
- 1. "California Sun" Released: December 1963; 2. "Let's Have a Party" Released: March 1964

Professional ratings
Review scores
Source	Rating
AllMusic	3/5 stars

Let's Have a Party is the debut album by the American rock band the Rivieras released in 1964 by USA Records. This album contains the band's biggest hit, "California Sun", which reached number five on the Billboard Hot 100 chart. The album continues the band's popular surf style, and contains covers of classic and contemporary rock and roll hits. The album's title track is a cover of Elvis Presley's "Let's Have a Party", written by Jessie Mae Robinson.

The album was reissued in Sweden in 1967 with the name California Sun!! by Sonet and Grand Prix Records. Another album sharing the title Let's Have a Party was released in Sweden in 1989 by Star-Club Records, but features an entirely different track listing; Side A is non-LP single tracks, and Side B has tracks from Campus Party. All tracks from Let's Have a Party were later compiled onto California Sun: The Best of the Rivieras in 2000.

== Background ==
With the band's newfound success with "California Sun", the Rivieras set out to record a full-length effort in February 1964 at Chicago's Columbia Recording Studios ("California Sun" was previously recorded in July 1963). While "California Sun" had become the band's biggest hit at this point, the band's original singer, Marty Fortson and guitarist, Joe Pennell had both left for the Marines. By the time of recording, they had been replaced by Bill Dobslaw and Jim Boal, respectively. Fortson and Pennell are uncredited for their contributions on "California Sun". Dobslaw aside, all members of the band were currently attending high school in South Bend, Indiana by the time of the album's release.

== Track listing ==
=== Original release ===
Side 1
No.	Title	Writer(s)	Length
1.	"California Sun"	Henry Glover	2:25
2.	"Danny Boy"	Frederic Weatherly	2:33
3.	"Twist & Shout"	Bert Russell and Phil Medley	2:10
4.	"Little Donna"	Bill Dobslaw	2:05
5.	"Church Key"	Dan Darnold	1:55
6.	"Killer Joe"	Bert Russell, Bob Elgin, Phil Medley	2:43
Total length:			13:51

Side 2
No.	Title	Writer(s)	Length
1.	"Let's Have a Party"	Jessie Mae Robinson	2:17
2.	"Rockin' Robin"	Jimmie Thomas	2:20
3.	"H. B. Goose Step"	The Rivieras	1:57
4.	"Keep a Knockin"	Richard Penniman	2:20
5.	"Oh, Boy"	Bill Tilghman and Sonny West	2:12
6.	"When the Saints"	Bill Dobslaw	2:34
Total length:			13:20

=== Star-Club Records release ===
Side one
No.	Title	Writer(s)	Length
1.	"Let's Have a Party" (Single Version)	Jessie Mae Robinson	2:34
2.	"Whole Lotta Shakin'"	Sunny David and Dave "Curlee" Williams	2:27
3.	"Rip It Up"	John Marascalco	2:03
4.	"Let's Go to Hawaii"	Bill Dobslaw	2:25
5.	"Battle Line"	Julia Ward Howe, arranged by Bill Dobslaw	1:59
6.	"Lakeview Lane"	Bill Dobslaw	2:02

Side two
No.	Title	Writer(s)	Length
1.	"California Sun-65"	Henry Glover	2:33
2.	"Money Honey"	Jesse Stone	2:10
3.	"Bug Juice"	Otto Nuss	1:53
4.	"Tossin' and Turnin'"	Ritchie Adams and Malou Rene	2:31
5.	"Church Key Part 2"	Dan Darnold	2:15
6.	"Comin' Back Home"	Bill Dobslaw	2:21

== Personnel ==
- Bill Dobslaw — singer, management, producer
- Paul Dennert — drums
- Otto Nuss — organ
- Doug Gean — bass guitar
- Jim Boal — lead guitar
- Willie Gaut — rhythm guitar, vocals (lead vocals on "Killer Joe")
- Marty "Bo" Fortson — lead vocals, rhythm guitar on "California Sun"
- Joe Pennell — lead guitar on "California Sun"

Production

- Bill Thomson — engineer
- Don Bronstein — cover
- Jim Golden — liner notes
- Miriam Linna — liner notes (Star-Club Records version)
