= The Centurians =

US musical group

- Also known as: The Centurions (reunion spelling)
- Origin: Costa Mesa, California, U.S.
- Genres: Surf rock
- Years active: Late 1950s–1960s 1990s–?
- Label: Del-Fi
- Past members: Dennis Rose; Joe Dominic; Ernie Furrow; Jerry Dicks; Pat Gagnebin; Jeffrey Lear; Ken Robison

The Centurians were an instrumental surf rock band started by Dennis Rose from Newport Beach, California. They were active in the late 1950s and early 1960s. Their music has been used in at least two films. They reformed as The Centurions in 1995 and released new material.

== Background ==
The group originated from Costa Mesa, California, they were a septet.

In recent times, they are best known for their recording "Bullwinkle Part II", a dark and saxy surf tune from their album Surfers' Pajama Party. This song is featured in the 1994 film Pulp Fiction where it is used to highlight a scene. It was also used in an episode of the TV show How I Met Your Mother entitled "Girls Versus Suits". Less well known is their cover of the classic song "Intoxica" a twangy and upbeat surf instrumental originally by The Revels, used in the 1972 film Pink Flamingos.

== Career ==
=== 1960s ===
In 1963, their line-up consisted of Pat Gagnebin, Ken Robinson, Dennis Rose, Joe Dominic, Dennis Kiklas, Ernie Furrow, and Jeff Lear. When they released their album on Del-Fi records in 1963, its cover was identical (as well as catalog number) to Bruce Johnston's release, hence the title "Surfers' Pajama Party" – which was not the name The Centurians had in mind. Their name was changed from The Centurions to The Centurians sometime after 1967 for legal reasons.

In 1966, some of the music they recorded, along with music by Dave Meyers and the Surf Tones and The Sentinels was involved in legal action by Al Schlesinger against the Del-Fi Records label. Schlesinger was representing Anthony Music and its principal shareholder Anthony Hilder in an action pursuing $122,000 over royalties not being paid as per an alleged agreement for the masters of albums and another album, Battle of the Surf Bands.

=== Later years ===
In June 1995 Dennis Rose reformed the group as "The Centurions" with Dennis Rose (guitar), David Jobes (drums), Charly Grey-Son (bass), Perris Alexander (keyboards), Norman Knowles (tenor sax) and Dennis Rehders (tenor and baritone sax). They recorded a new album called Bullwinkle Part III produced by Dennis Rose and Perris Alexander. A review of the 1995 re-issue of Bullwinkle Part II by Alan Taylor, editor of UK magazine Pipeline Instrumental Review, stated that "The Centurions had more than one string to their bow. Their tough rhythm section, raunchy sax and deep resonant lead guitar had worked up a whole album's worth of instrumentals for Bob Keane's label. You can savour the band's sound on all twelve tracks and several stand out as genuinely classic surf performances". In August 1995 the group performed a concert at Pierfest in Huntington Beach.

== Legacy ==
The song "Bullwinkle Part II" was used in the 1994 film Pulp Fiction and features on the soundtrack album. The film's success led to the band's reunion. In 1999 "Bullwinkle Part II" was covered by Elliot Easton's Tiki Gods on the Del-Fi tribute compilation "Delfonic Sounds Today!".

== Original members ==
List
Name	Role	Notes #
Dennis Rose	guitar and bass	
Joe Dominic	drums	
Ernie Furrow	guitar and bass	
Jerry Dicks	keyboard	
Pat Gagnebin	sax and harmonica	
Jeffrey Lear	bass	
Ken Robison	sax, flute and clarinet	

== Discography ==
Film
Act	Title	Label and catalogue no.	Year	Notes #
The Centurians	Surfers' Pajama Party (Recorded Live on the U.C.L.A. Campus)	Del-Fi DFLP 1228	1963	reissued in 1995 on CD as Bullwinkle Part II by The Centurions (Del-Fi CD 71250-2)
The Centurians a.o.	Surf War - The Battle of the Surf Groups	Shepherd Records – SLP 1300	1963	six tracks on a compilation
The Centurions	Bullwinkle Part III	myspace online release	1995	
