= The Tornadoes =

American surf band

- Also known as: The Hollywood Tornadoes
- Origin: Redlands, California, United States
- Genres: Surf rock
- Years active: 1960–2014
- Labels: Aertaun Records, Josie Records
- Past members: Norman Sanders; Jesse Sanders; Gerald Sanders; Leonard Delaney; Joel Willenbring; Mike Gooch; George White; Ernie Tavizon; Eddie Rea
- Website: Official website

The Tornadoes were an American surf band from Redlands, California. They were the second band to receive national airplay with a surf instrumental, after The Marketts, with their song "Bustin' Surfboards", released on Aertaun Records in 1962. "Bustin' Surfboards" has since become a classic and mainstay of the surf genre. One of its distinctions, and appeals, was that the song opened with the sound of an ocean swell that continued throughout the song, thereby creating a sense of being at a beach. The album with the same name was belatedly released on September 20, 1963. The band, however, did not manage to follow up on their success. Their song "Shootin' Beavers" was banned from airplay because of its suggestive title. The band temporarily changed their name to The Hollywood Tornadoes, because the British band The Tornados were charting with the song "Telstar."

"Bustin' Surfboards" was included on the Pulp Fiction soundtrack in 1994, thereby renewing interest in the band. The Tornadoes continued to perform through 2007. Members as of 2007 (including four members of the original band) were brothers Gerald (bass) and Norman "Roly" Sanders (lead guitar), their cousin Jesse Sanders (July 1943 – June 7, 2020) (rhythm guitar), Leonard Delaney (May 18, 1943 – October 5, 2014; drums) and Joel Willenbring (saxophone).

In 2005, they released a CD called Now and Then on the Crossfire Publications label containing 29 tracks, including live recordings from their performance at the Zappanale concert in Germany in 2003, cuts from a 1998 CD, and two new recordings. The 2006 Crossfire Publications CD Charge Of The Tornadoes featured more of their 1960s masters and Zappanale performances.

The band announced on their website that they would retire and cease performing as of November 2008, but the band has since decided to continue. During a conversation with Crossfire Publications head Greg Russo on July 13, 2014, Tornadoes leader Gerald Sanders confirmed that the band was still active.

Former band member Leonard Delaney died on October 5, 2014, aged 71, in San Bernardino, California, from complications of Alzheimer's disease. Former band member Jesse Sanders died at age 76 on June 7, 2020, of Alzheimer's disease also.

== Discography ==
=== Singles ===
- "Bustin' Surfboards" (Norman Sanders, Leonard Delaney) / "Beyond the Surf" (Dave Aerni) Aertaun Records (1962)
- "The Gremmie Pt. 1" / "The Gremmie Pt. 2" Aertaun Records (1962) (Issued as The Hollywood Tornadoes)
- "Moon Dawg" / "The Inebriated Surfer" Aertaun Records (1963) (Issued as The Hollywood Tornadoes)
- "Phantom Surfer" / "Shootin' Beavers" Aertaun Records (1963)
- "Phantom Surfer" / "Lightnin'" Aertaun Records (1964) ("Lightnin'" is an instrumental version of "Shootin' Beavers")
- "The Swag" / "Rawhide" Sundazed Music (2000)

=== Albums ===
- Bustin' Surfboards Josie Records (1963); CD reissue: Sundazed Music (1993)
- Bustin' Surfboards '98 DCC Compact Classics (1998)
