= Campus Party (album) =

Studio album by The Rivieras
- Released: 1965
- Genres: Rock and roll, frat rock, garage rock
- Label: Riviera Records LP 106
- Producer: Bill Dobslaw

The Rivieras chronology
Let's Have a Party (1964)	Campus Party (1965)	California Sun: The Best of the Rivieras (2000)

Singles from Campus Party
- 1. "Somebody New" Released: September 1965

Professional ratings
Review scores
Source	Rating
AllMusic	4.5/5 stars

Campus Party is the second and final studio album by the American rock band the Rivieras, released in 1965 through Riviera Records. This album continued the band's "frat rock" sound, and contains many popular cover songs done in this style. This album, as well as the previous, were compiled on the 2000 greatest-hits release California Sun: The Best of the Rivieras. Previously, tracks from Campus Party were available on the Star-Club Records compilation also titled Let's Have A Party.

== Background ==
Unlike the band's previous album, Campus Party did not receive wide distribution from U.S.A. Records, and there's estimated to have been about 1000 copies pressed, making it extremely scarce. No singles were put out in promotion of the album, but the track "Bug Juice" appears as a B-side to the single "Never Feel The Pain", released in 1964. Campus Party introduces Jeff McKew on rhythm guitar and Terry McCoy on drums, replacing Willie Gaut and Paul Dennert, respectively. This album would be the band's final studio effort, as the band folded the following year due to the changing music atmosphere and personal issues.

Among the covers on the album, "California Sun '65" is a remake of the band's biggest hit, "California Sun", with new lyrics. The album closes with a medley of "Louie Louie" and "Farmer John", the former being popularized by the Kingsmen. "Somebody New" (backed by a non-LP track, "Somebody Asked Me") was released in September 1965 as a single from the album.

== Track listing ==
Side one
No.	Title	Writer(s)	Length
1.	"California Sun '65"	Henry Glover	2:33
2.	"Hanky Panky"	Jeff Barry and Ellie Greenwich, arranged by Bill Dobslaw	2:39
3.	"Tossin' and Turnin'"	Ritchie Adams and Malou Rene	2:31
4.	"Somebody New"	Bill Dobslaw	2:11
5.	"Money Honey"	Jesse Stone	2:10
6.	"Bug Juice"	Otto Nuss	1:53

Side two
No.	Title	Writer(s)	Length
1.	"Fortune Teller"	Naomi Neville	2:09
2.	"Doctor Feelgood"	C. Smith	2:46
3.	"Comin' Back Home"	Bill Dobslaw	2:21
4.	"Church Key Part 2"	Dan Darnold	2:46
5.	"Louie Louie" "Farmer John"	Richard Berry; Terry Harris	7:05
Total length:			26:08

== Personnel ==
- Bill Dobslaw — lead vocals, management, producer
- Jim Boal — lead guitar
- Otto Nuss — organ and piano
- Doug Gean — bass guitar
- Jeff McKew — rhythm guitar, vocals
- Terry McCoy — drums
