= The Coach House (San Juan Capistrano, California) =

American music venue

Coordinates: 33.4821°N 117.6715°W

Walter Trout performing at the Coach House in 2024

The Coach House is a music venue located at 33157 Camino Capistrano in San Juan Capistrano, California. The venue opened in 1980 and seats 400 It hosts aspiring artists as well as those established in the industry.

Some notable past performers include B.B. King, Pat Benatar, Richard Marx, Bonnie Raitt, The Motels, Billy Squier, The Fixx, Eddie Money, Helen Reddy, A Flock Of Seagulls, Chris Isaak, Tori Amos, Tom Jones, Miles Davis, Warren Zevon, Frank Black, UFO, J.J. Cale, Lone Justice, Rick Derringer, Tom Tom Club and Devo.

== Events ==
In May 2019, a benefit concert was held for surf music legend Dick Dale. Artists such as Will Glover of The Pyramids, Bob Berryhill of The Surfaris, Bob Spickard of The Chantays and other surf musicians were selected to play at the event.
