= The Pyramids (band) =

American surf band

- Origin: Long Beach, California, United States
- Genres: Surf rock
- Years active: 1961–65
- Labels: Best, Cedwicke, Archer, Sundazed
- Past members: Skip Mercier (lead guitar); Willie Glover (rhythm guitar); Steve Leonard (bass guitar); Tom Pitman (saxophone); Ron McMullen (drums) Drake Jenkins (drums) Rick Johnson (drums)

The Pyramids were a surf group from Long Beach, California, United States, who formed in 1961. In early 1964, they made the Top 20 of the Billboard Hot 100 with their instrumental "Penetration". It proved to be the final major instrumental surf hit.

== History ==
The band started in 1961 and was made up of five students from Poly High in Long Beach. All of them played some rock 'n' roll. The members were Skip Mercier on lead and rhythm guitar, Ron McMullen on drums, Tom Pitman on sax, Willie Glover on rhythm guitar and Steve Leonard on bass. Drake Jenkins replaced McMullen on drums in 1964. The group got their first break at a San Bernardino dance which a local radio station had sponsored. After the show, some of the dancers and deejays suggested that they record an infectious number that people would like to hear repeated. Steve Leonard composed a number which was to become "Penetration".

== Career ==
The group was approached by John Hodge who offered to manage and record them. He took them to Garrison Studios in Long Beach and they cut two sides. The single "Pyramid's Stomp" sold only a handful of copies due to the lack of promotion and airplay. After that, they played record hops and school dances. They recorded a single with "Here Comes Marsha" as the A side and "Penetration" as the B side. It was originally called "Eyeballs", and was based on "Pipeline" by The Chantays.

It's possible that the interest in "Penetration" started due to a Riverside DJ not playing the Will Glover-composed A side "Here Comes Marsha" but instead playing the flip side "Penetration". With this single, released in October 1963, their manager Hodge managed to secure local airplay. He also got national distribution with the London Records label.

By February 22, 1964, their Original Penetration album was released on Best BR 16501 with Billboard mentioning "Penetration" as receiving singles attention, and "Louie Louie", "Out of Limits" and "Road Runnah" as other danceable tunes.

By March 7th, the album was in the Breakout albums New Action LPs section which showed the non-charting albums getting major attention by dealers in major markets. Two weeks later it was in the Billboard TOP LP's chart at #121, having moved up 9 notches from the previous week's position of 130. By April 4, it was at #119. On the 11th of April it was at its fifth week in the chart and had moved down to #120.

Meanwhile, the "Penetration" single spent a total of ten weeks in the charts, peaking at #18 on the Billboard "Hot 100" chart for March 14, 1964. There was also some success with the now B-side, "Here Comes Marsha," written and sung by Will, as a regional hit in Texas thanks to deejays who also played that side of the single.

In July 1964, the group appeared in the American International Pictures' film Bikini Beach which starred Frankie Avalon and Annette Funicello.

For the film they performed two songs, “Record Run” and the instrumental "Bikini Drag", both written by Gary Usher and Roger Christian. They are also shown performing back-up on two other songs (both written by Guy Hemric and Jerry Styner): "How About That?" by Frankie Avalon and "Happy Feelin’ (Dance and Shout)" by Little Stevie Wonder. At one stage in the movie, The Pyramids were involved in a fun stunt. They came on stage wearing Beatles wigs and were playing the song "Record Run". With the aid of a fishing line above, they then had them pulled off to reveal their shaved heads.

== Later years ==
After The Pyramids, three of the band's members, Skip Mercier, Steve Leonard and Will Glover joined Long Beach musicians, Mike Marchman, Jim Foelber and Chris Myers and played in a club band called The Family Cat. They played around Orange County in the nightclubs until 1973.

In 1995, Sundazed Music released a 20 track CD Penetration! The Best of the Pyramids. Bob Irwin from the label had worked closely with music director for The Revels, Tony Hilder and band members Sam Eddy and Norman Knowles to get their work re-released in later years. He did the same with this compilation. He was pleased to find John Hodge, the manager and producer for the Pyramids, because Hodge owned the masters for the original recordings, which included unissued music. Hodge also had a strong love of the music. Irwin was also planning a second release of their work. It was to be an album of unreleased material.

Drummer Ron McMullen died on January 7, 2015, in Long Beach, California.

== Production and management ==
In addition to managing The Pyramids, John Hodge also produced their work, but other people were involved in the production, such as Larry Wilson who co-produced with Hodge, the single Midnight Run" b/w "Custom Caravan". Also, the material for The Pyramids in the film Bikini Beach was produced by Gary Usher. Hodge and Wilson had worked with other bands such as Wee Willie & The Pals and produced of their 1964 single "We’re Gonna Dance" / "Teardrop Strawberry Soda". Hodge produced The Daisy Chain album, Straight Or Lame which was released in 1967.

== Discography ==
US singles
Title	Catalogue	Year	Notes #
"Paul" / "Pyramid's Stomp"	Best 45-BR-1	1962	
"Pyramid's Stomp" / "Paul"	Best BR-101	1962	
"Pyramid's Stomp" / "Paul"	Best 45-13001	1963	
"Here Comes Marsha" / "Penetration"	Best BR-102	1963	
"Penetration" / "Here Comes Marsha"	Best 45-13002	1963	
"Midnight Run" / "Custom Caravan"	Cedwicke 45-13005	1964	
"Pressure" / "Contact"	Cedwicke 45-13006	1964	
"I Don't Wanna Cry" / "I'm A Love Ya"	Archer 45-102	1965	
"Stay With Me" / "I Don't Wanna Cry"	Archer 45-103	1965	
"Carol Ann" / "Bikini Drag"	Sundazed S-111	2000	

Albums
Title	Catalogue	Year	Notes #
The Pyramids Play The Original Penetration!	Best BR 16501	1964	
Penetration! The Best Of The Pyramids	Sundazed LP 5012	1995	CD issued on Sundazed SC 11023

=== Other countries ===
EPs
Title	Catalogue	Year	Tracks	Notes #
The Original Penetration	London RE 10.161	1964	A. "Penetration", "Everybody"; B. "Road Runnah", "Sticks and Skins"	(France)
