= Will Glover =

American musician

- Also known as: Willie Glover, Willy Glover
- Born: West Palm Beach, Florida, United States
- Genres: Surf, country, rock, R&B
- Occupations: Musician, construction company owner
- Instrument: Guitar
- Years active: 1963-present
- Website: Website

Will Glover a.k.a. Willie Glover is a musician and songwriter from Southern California. He was a member of the hit surf group The Pyramids. Will bears the distinction of being perhaps the only African-American musician in surf music history.

== Background ==
Glover was born in North Carolina. His father was a career Navy man and the family moved around a bit until they finally settled into Naval housing on Santa Fe Avenue in Long Beach, California in 1961.

His father wanted him to have a military career but Glover had different dreams, even in middle school. When Will was 12 he told his dad "no" to that idea, and in fact had already been singing at Boy Scouts events and playing guitar since he was nine.

According to The History of Surfing by Matt Warshaw, Glover is considered surf music's only black musician. Additionally, he is also a left-handed guitar player.

== Career ==
=== The Pyramids ===
Formed in Long Beach in 1962, it all began with Will and Alfred "Skip" Mercier, fellow Long Beach Polytechnic High students, teaching each other songs by the hit guitar instrumental combo The Ventures. Soon they brought in three others to form the quintet.

The Pyramids were made up of Will on rhythm guitar, Skip on lead guitar, Steve Leonard playing bass, Ken McMullen on drums and Tom Pitman handling saxophone.

Seeking to establish themselves from other bands, they became known for stunts like going on stage in trench coats and fake pants, which they then removed to perform in their shorts. They would also try to upstage a headliner like The Beach Boys by arriving at a show via helicopter.

As a songwriter he wrote (and sang) "Here Comes Marsha" which first appeared in October 1963 as the A-side of Best 102, a Long Beach label. However, once the disc acquired national distribution, the flip-side, a hypnotic surf instrumental composed by bandmate Steve called "Penetration," became the track played by disc jockeys.

Best 102 spent a total of ten weeks on the charts, peaking at #18 on the Billboard "Hot 100" for March 14, 1964.

Will also wrote "I Don't Wanna Cry" for the group.

=== Post Pyramids ===
After the demise of the Pyramids in the 1960s, Glover carried playing into the 1970s. He was a member of a club group called The Family Cat whose members were Long Beach musicians Mike Marchman, Jim Foelber and Chris Myers. Other members were Skip Mercier and Steve Leonard. They played in nightclubs around the Orange County district. The Family Cat carried on until 1973.

By the time he was married and had moved to a ranch in a Riverside, he had left the music business. Looking for a steady income Glover worked at various jobs, which included working at a gas station and, later, he started his own construction company.

=== Later years ===
In the late 1980s, and not having played in years, he was taken by a friend to see Jann Browne. Having his interest in singing reignited he was invited by Browne to sit in with her. He also entered some talent contests which gained a following for him in Country music. From there, he carried on with his career.

In the mid-1990s, Glover was still running his own construction and demolition business.

In 2019, Glover along with Bob Berryhill of The Surfaris, Bob Spickard of The Chantays and other surf musicians were selected to play at the benefit at The Coach House in San Juan Capistrano, California on Saturday May 25 to honor Dick Dale.

== Solo recordings ==
Glover's solo debut was Standing in the Line of Fire was first released in 1997 had a folk roots style to it. It contained the songs "In Times Like These", which was done in a style similar to the Doobie Brothers and a romping blues style song called "Cold Hearted Lover". His second album was The Will Glover Experience which was released in 2014.

== Venues ==
=== 1990s ===
Along with the Kari Gaffney Band and the Anthony Rivera Band, he played the Coach House at San Juan Capistrano, California in March 1997. Along with James Intveld and Chris Gaffney, Glover was headlining at the Crazy Horse Steak House on Tuesday nights starting from mid-May. On October 19, 1999, he was appearing at the Crazy Horse again.

=== 2000s ===
On December 10, 2013, Glover was to appear at Clubhouse 3 performing a tribute to Chuck Berry, who he had performed with in the past.

== Discography ==
Releases
Title	Release info	Year	Format	Notes #
Standing in the Line of Fire	Mel-Glo Records	1997, 2000	CD	
The Will Glover Experience			CD	
