= Gandalf (American band) =

Late 1960s psychedelic rock group

Background information
- Origin: New York City, U.S.
- Genres: Psychedelic rock; baroque pop; psychedelic pop
- Years active: 1965–68
- Labels: Capitol; Sundazed
- Past members: Peter Sando; Frank Hubach; Bob Muller; Davy Bauer

Gandalf were a short-lived American psychedelic rock band formed in 1965 in New York City. The band only released one studio album, the self-titled Gandalf in 1969, after disbanding the previous year.

== History ==
Originally called the Rahgoos, the group consisted of guitarist Peter Sando, bassist Bob Muller, keyboardist Frank Hubach and drummer Davy Bauer.

They signed a recording contract with Capitol Records in 1967. Producers Koppelman & Rubin were not happy with the band's name, and suggested it be changed to the Knockrockers. However, Peter Sando commented that they "hated that and bantered about various names". Despite being against the band's will, and losing local fan recognition, Davy suggested the name "Gandalf and The Wizards", which ended up sticking as "Gandalf".

They recorded their first LP the same year. The record includes covers of Tim Hardin, Eden Ahbez and Bonner & Gordon (the writers of "Happy Together") and two songs composed by the band's guitarist, Peter Sando. But Capitol spurned them and only released the LP in 1969 with the wrong record inside the sleeve. The copies were recalled and damaged the band's career. Capitol did not promote the record, which made the sales worse. Over the years the album's reputation grew and it was re-released by Sundazed Music in 2002. A second album, 2, was released by Sundazed in 2007.

== Band members ==
- Peter Sando - guitar
- Frank Hubach - keyboards
- Bob Muller - bass guitar
- Davy Bauer - drums

== Discography ==
Gandalf (Capitol, 1969)

1. "Golden Earrings" (Ray Evans/Jay Livingston/Victor Young cover)
2. "Hang On To A Dream" (Tim Hardin cover)
3. "Never Too Far" (Hardin)
4. "Scarlet Ribbons" (Evelyn Danzig/Jack Segal cover)
5. "You Upset The Grace Of Living" (Hardin)
6. "Can You Travel In The Dark Alone" (Peter Sando)
7. "Nature Boy" (Eden Ahbez cover)
8. "Tiffany Rings" (Garry Bonner/Alan Gordon cover)
9. "Me About You" (Bonner/Gordon)
10. "I Watch The Moon" (Sando)
