= The Lively Ones =

American surf music band

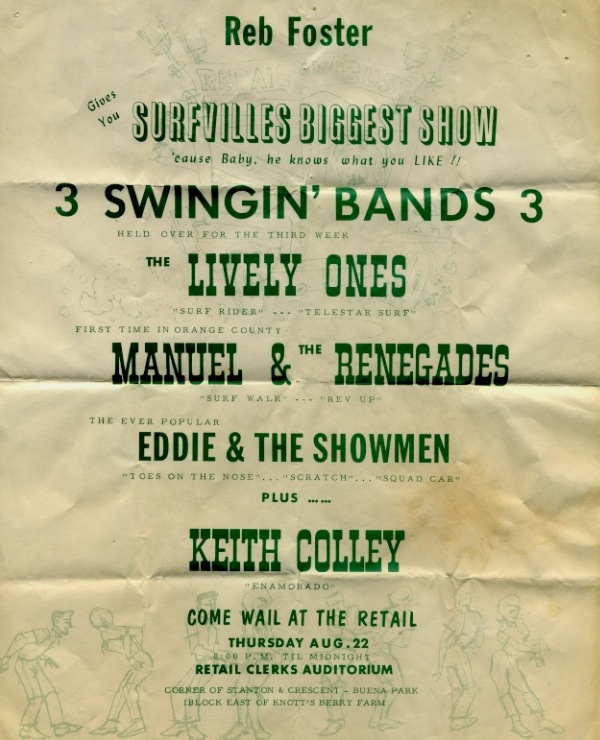
- 1963 Performance Flyer

Background information
- Origin: California, U.S.
- Genres: Surf
- Years active: 1962-1965
- Label: Del-Fi
- Past members: Jim Masoner; Ed Chiaverini; Joel Willenbring; Tim Fitzpatrick; John Benton; Tracy Sands; Earthman III; Ron Griffith

The Lively Ones, originally The Surfmen, were an American surf music band from southern California in the 1960s.

== Background ==
They played live mostly in California and Arizona. They recorded for Del-Fi records with production from Bob Keane. They recorded mostly cover songs, but there were a few originals.

Their 1963 song "Surf Rider" (written by Nokie Edwards from The Ventures) was featured in the final sequence as well as the end credits of Quentin Tarantino's 1994 film Pulp Fiction. The Lively Ones were interviewed by Pipeline Instrumental Review in 1997 which also showcased their discography.

They are best known with these members:

- Lead guitar: Jim Masoner
- Rhythm guitar: Ed Chiaverini
- Bass guitar: Ron Griffith (d.January 2, 2025)
- Saxophone: Joel Willenbring
- Drums: Tim Fitzpatrick

Currently, John Benton plays rhythm/alternate lead guitar and Tracy Sands plays bass guitar. Recent live shows have featured Earthman on rhythm/alternate lead guitar. Ron Griffith, original bassist, died January 2, 2025.

== Discography ==
=== Albums ===
- Surf Rider! (Del-Fi DFLP-1226, 4/63)
- Surf Drums (Del-Fi DFLP-1231, 6/63)
- Surf City (Del-Fi DFLP-1237, 8/63)
- The Great Surf Hits! (Del-Fi DFLP-1238, 9/63)
- Surfin' South of the Border (Del-Fi DFLP-1240, 11/64) shared album with the Surf Mariachis
- Bugalu Party (MGM SE-4449, 1967)

=== CD compilations ===
- Hang Five! The Best of the Lively Ones (Del-Fi DFCD-9004, 1995)
- Heads Up! The Best of the Lively Ones, Vol. 2 (Del-Fi DFCD-9005, 1999)

=== Singles ===
- "Crying Guitar" // "Guitarget" (Del-Fi DF-4184, 10/62)
- "Miserlou" // "Livin'" (Del-Fi DF-4189, 11/62)
- "Surf Rider" // "Surfer's Lament" (Del-Fi DF-4196, 2/63)
- "Rik-A-Tic" // "Surfer Boogie" (Del-Fi DF-4205, 4/63)
- "High Tide" // "Goofy Foot" (Del-Fi DF-4210, 6/63)
- "Telstar Surf" // "Surf City" (Del-Fi DF-4217, 7/63)
- "Exodus" // "Surfing Memories" (Del-Fi DF-4224, 10/63)
- "Night And Day" // "Hey, Scrounge" (Smash S-1880, 2/64)
- "Bugalu Movement" // "Take It While You Can" (MGM K-13691, 3/67)

== Bibliography ==
- Burt, Rob (1986), Surf City, Drag City, Blandford Press, ISBN 0-7137-1890-0
- Dalley, Robert J. (1988), Surfin' Guitars: Instrumental Surf Bands of the Sixties, Surf Publications, ISBN 978-1-56075-042-0
