= Morly Grey =

American psychedelic rock band

- Also known as: Roller Bros Band
- Origin: Alliance, Ohio
- Genres: Psychedelic rock, hard rock, garage rock
- Years active: 1969–present
- Labels: Speed Label, Starshine Records, Sundazed Music
- Members: Mark Roller, Tim Roller
- Past members: Paul Cassidy (deceased), Randy Byron (deceased), Bobby LaNave (deceased)

Morly Grey is an American psychedelic rock band that formed in the late 1960s.

The group recorded their first album, The Only Truth, which was released in 1972. Some discographies and music catalogs continue to list the album's release date as 1968 or 1969. The confusion over the release date may come from the album's serial number of 69000 (originally released through the unpublished Starshine label) and the fact that the album had a very short release period. The first single from the album was "Who Can I Say You Are". Most pressings of this single incorrectly list the album's original title as 'The First Supper'. In the 1980s and 1990s, the original vinyl LP pressing of the album had become somewhat of a collector's item due to its rarity, and the fact that it came with a full-size color poster.

They also recorded a live album and live video in 1973 (unreleased) (Paul, Mark and Tim) and a second album in 1973 on their vanity label (RBB Records) called The Roller Bros. Band (Bob, Mark and Tim with guest musicians). Between 1995 and 1997, Bob, Mark and Tim recorded new (unreleased) material in the studio. Morly Grey performed as the opening act for Bob Seger, The Platters, Brownsville Station, Mitch Ryder and the Detroit Wheels, Cactus (formerly of Vanilla Fudge), Wolfman Jack and others. Also the band L.A.W. opened for them.

In 2009, Sundazed Music signed the band to remaster and reissue The Only Truth with previously unreleased bonus tracks.

== Musicians ==
- Tim Roller - all guitars, backing vocals
- Mark Roller - Composer, bass, lead vocals
- Paul Cassidy - drums
- Bob LaNave - Drums (Side II of The Only Truth)
- Randy Byron - guitar, vocals

== History ==
Early Morly Grey

Early Morly Grey : Started in 1969 with (left to right) Paul Cassidy (drums), Randy Byron (guitar), Tim Roller (guitar) and Mark Roller (bass). The band that recorded "Yas" and "Sleepy Softness".

Middle Morly Grey

Middle Morly Grey : After Randy Byron left, the band became the trio for side one of The Only Truth. They were (left to right) Paul Cassidy (drums), Tim Roller (guitar) and Mark Roller (bass).

Later Morly Grey

Later Morly Grey : After Paul Cassidy left, they became the threesome of side two of The Only Truth and The Roller Bros. Band. They were (left to right) Mark Roller (bass), Bob LaNave (drums), Tim Roller (guitar).

== Discography ==
=== Albums ===
- The Only Truth LP (Starshine Records, 1972)
- The Roller Bros. Band LP (RBB Records) (Speed Label, 1973)
- The Only Truth CD (Speed Label, 2005)

=== Singles ===
- "Yas" 45 rpm (1969)
- "Sleepy Softness" 45 rpm (1969)
- "Who Can I Say You Are" 45 rpm (1972)
- "After Me Again" 45 rpm (1972)
- "Be Your King" 45 rpm/CD single (1972/2008)
- "I'll Space You" 45 rpm/CD single (1972/2008)
