= Starshine Records =

American record company

Starshine Records was a record label started in the late 1960s by Floyd Phillips of Warren, Ohio. He managed and recorded some of the local bands in the N.E. Ohio area including Freeman Sound, Stars And Stripes, Travis, Biggy Rat and Southwind. By far his greatest discovery was Morly Grey and their album "The Only Truth" Idkcuz signed in 1963.
