= The Rivieras =

American rock band

- Also known as: The Playmates, Wildcat
- Origin: South Bend, Indiana, U.S.
- Genres: Rock, frat rock, surf
- Years active: 1962–1966, 2000–2010
- Labels: Riviera, Columbia, Vogue Schallplatten
- Past members: Paul Dennert; Marty Fortson; Joe Pennell; Doug Gean; Otto Nuss; Jim Boal; Willie Gaut; Bill Dobslaw; Terry McCoy; Bobby Wantuch; Jeff McKew; Stanley "Chip" Baginski; Rocky Geans
- Website: rivieras.tripod.com

The Rivieras were an American rock band that formed in the early 1960s in South Bend, Indiana. They had a hit with the song "California Sun".

== History ==
The Rivieras were made up of teenagers from South Bend Central High School. Originally called the Playmates, they were forced to change their name as there was already a band with that name. They renamed themselves after an automobile, the Buick Riviera. They were one of the many bands in America that became part of the frat rock movement in the early 1960s.

The Rivieras consisted of Marty "Bo" Fortson on vocals and guitar, Joe Pennell on guitar, Otto Nuss on organ, Doug Gean on bass guitar, and Paul Dennert on drums. The band had its only hit in 1964 with a cover version of the song "California Sun" by Joe Jones. It climbed the pop charts when the No. 1 song was "I Want to Hold Your Hand" by the Beatles.

Fortson, Pennell and Nolte left the group for the Marine Corps shortly after recording "California Sun". They were replaced by Jim Boal (lead guitar) and Willie Gaut (vocals, rhythm guitar) and Bobby Wantuch (drums). The band's manager, Bill Dobslaw, took over as lead vocalist. Other members left the group under parental pressure to concentrate on education. Replacements included Jeff McKew (vocals, guitar) and Terry McCoy (drums). Rocky Geans, cousin of Doug Gean, was also a replacement that played lead/bass for over 25 years.

The band quit after two years due to the draft, changes in membership, and the shifting musical taste of the public, which was partially due to the British Invasion. During the 1980s, Fortson, Gean, and Nuss reunited to perform again. They recorded a 10-track vanity album to be sold at appearances.

The band was revived in 2000 under the name Wildcat by Fortson, Pennell, and Dennert with Kevin Szucsits on keyboard and bass. The name, from the Buick Wildcat, followed the retirement of Gean and Nuss. With the name change came a more modern, hard rock sound.

Pennell died on April 21, 2011, at the age of 66. Fortson died on September 26, 2012, at age 67.

== Members ==
- Marty "Bo" Fortson (April 14, 1945 – September 26, 2012) — lead vocals and rhythm guitar (1962–1963)
- Doug Gean — bass guitar (1962–)
- Joe Pennell — guitar (1962–1963)
- Otto Nuss — organ (1962–1966)
- Paul Dennert — drums (1962–1964)
- Stanley "Chip" Baginski — drums
- Bill Dobslaw — lead vocals (1963–)
- Willy Gaut — vocals, rhythm guitar (1963–1965)
- Jim Boal — lead guitar (1963–1965)
- Bobby Wantuch — drums
- John Swoveland — bass guitar (1966–1967)

== Discography ==
=== Albums ===
- Let's Have a Party (1964)
- Campus Party (Riviera, 1965)

=== Singles ===
- "Played On/California Sun" (Riviera, 1964)
- "California Sun/H.B. Goose Step" (Riviera, 1964)
- "Let's Have a Party/Little Donna" (Riviera, 1964)
- "Rockin' Robin/Battle Line" (Riviera, 1964)
- "Whole Lotta Shakin'/Rip It Up" (Riviera, 1965)
- "Whole Lotta Shakin'/Whole Lotta Shakin'" (Riviera, 1965)
- "Let's Go to Hawaii/Lakeview Lane" (Riviera, 1965)
- "Somebody New/Somebody Asked Me" (Riviera, 1965)
- "Never Feel the Pain/Bug Juice" (Riviera, 1965)
- "California Sun/Little Donna/Back in the Sun" (Riviera, 1965)
- "California Sun '65"
