= Music Emporium =

American psychedelic rock band

Background information
- Origin: Los Angeles, California, United States
- Genres: Psychedelic rock; psychedelic pop
- Years active: 1967–1969
- Label: Sentinel
- Past members: Bill "Casey" Cosby; Dora Wohl; Thom Wade; Steve Rustad; Carol Lee; Dave Padwin

Music Emporium was an American psychedelic rock band formed in Los Angeles, California, in 1967. Fronted by experimental multi-instrumentalist Bill "Casey" Cosby, the group was created at UCLA, and developed a sound centered around Cosby's keyboards and vocal harmonies. Music Emporium released one ultra-rare self-titled album in 1969, which is praised among psychedelic enthusiasts and has been re-released multiple times.

== History ==
Group leader Bill "Casey" Cosby (multi-instrumentalist, vocals) possessed a classical music and jazz background, winning multiple national musical competitions and recording an album called Accordion Masters, under the name William Cosby, in 1967. Hoping to embrace the psychedelic rock popular in Los Angeles, Cosby became well-rehearsed with the keyboards and began jamming with UCLA colleague Dora Wahl (drums). Cosby formed the band Gentle Thursday with Wahl and two other fellow UCLA students Thom Wade (lead guitar, vocals) and Steve Rustad (bass guitar). Around the same time, Wade introduced Cosby to the material released by Love, particularly the album Forever Changes, which became a primary influence on the compositions developed in the Music Emporium. In 1968, Gentle Thursday morphed into Cage, and recruited Carol Lee (bass guitar, piano, vocals), another classically trained musician.

Rustad and Wade departed the group, though the latter continued to write songs with Cosby. The finalized line-up of the band was complete when they added guitarist Dave Padwin, who was first encountered at a guitar shop on Santa Monica Boulevard. Through his connections in the music industry, Cosby convinced record producer Bill Lazerus to record demos with Cage at Sunset Recorders Studios. Initially, Lazerus could not find any record label to sign the group to complete an album, until Jack Ames, a producer who was fired from Liberty Records, hoped to recruit the band to his own independent label. Per Ames's suggestion, Cage changed their name to Music Emporium under the assumption the "softer" moniker would translate to a wider audience. With financial limitations burdening the band, Ames only re-recorded the vocals over the pre-existing instrumentals from the demo sessions.

Music Emporium was released in 1969 on Sentinel Records, with a limited run of 300 copies. Included in the album's package was an elaborate die-cut cover through whose "windows" the portrait of the Music Emporium on the inner sleeve photo could be seen. Marked by Cosby's intricate keyboard instrumentals and dreamy female vocal harmonies, music historian Richie Unterberger compares Music Emporium to the Jefferson Airplane and the United States of America. Unterberger also described it as "nice gothic/classical touch, and the lyrics are excessively cosmic". The album, which produced the single "Nam Myo Ho Renge Kyo", went unadvertised, granted a few appearances on local radio stations. Music Emporium was not well received in venues anticipating Top 40 radio cover versions; however, the band achieved a sizable following as a regular at the club, the Odyssey, which promoted original material.

Cosby revealed in an interview the band had the basic concept prepared for a follow-up album, with a working-title Multiple Choice, Everyone's Almost There. However, the Music Emporium disbanded in late 1969 when Cosby was drafted to enter service in the Vietnam War. Since the break-up of the group, Music Emporium has become one of the most prized albums of the psychedelic era. It has been reissued several times: first by Psycho Records in 1983, and later Sundazed Music released a deluxe version with five bonus tracks (albeit five instrumental versions of songs from the original). In addition, "Nam Myo Ho Renge Kyo", arguably the group's best-known composition, is featured on compilation albums such as Gathering of the Tribe, Acid Trip from the Psychedelic Sixties, and Sixties Archive, Volume 8.

== Members ==
- Bill "Casey" Cosby – multi-instrumentalist, vocals
- Dora Wahl – drums
- Thom Wade – lead guitar, vocals (1967–1968)
- Steve Rustad – bass guitar (1967–1968)
- Dave Padwin – lead guitar (1968–1970)
- Carol Lee – bass guitar, piano, vocals (1968–1970)

== Discography ==
=== Single ===
- "Nam Myo Ho Renge Kyo" b/w "Times Like This" – Sentinel (4–501), 1969

=== Album ===
- Music Emporium – Sentinel (PC-690001), 1969
