= Norman Knowles =

- Genre: Surf
- Occupation: Musician
- Instrument: Saxophone
- Years active: Late 1950s to 2000s

Norman Knowles is a surf musician, band leader, and record producer from California. He is the composer of several classic surf songs, including as co-writer of the surf classic "Church Key", which was a hit for The Revels. He also has been involved in band management, managing another surf band, The Sentinals. Knowles has made a significant contribution to the surf genre.

== Background ==
Knowles' compositions include "Church Key", "Intoxicate", and "Six Pak". He also produced "Latin’Ia" by The Sentinals. He was responsible for the first recorded release by The Impacts. He co-owned a record label with Tony Hilder. The label, Westco Records was located in Morro Bay. As well as being the saxophonist and the band leader being of The Revels, he was also a both a member and manager of another surf rock act, The Sentinals.

Having become tired of travelling and not making much money, Knowles got out of performing. He moved into management and booking acts. In 1989 and at the age of 50, he was working as an Amtrak ticket agent He had his own 200-acre ranch near King City in central California.

== Career ==
=== 1950s to 1960s ===
Between 1959 and 1961, Knowles was leading The Revels. They were originally called Gil Serna and The Rockets. When he changed their name to The Revels, the group's career took off. He had success with a composition. Besides his co-composition with Dan Darnold, the classic "Church Key" (which was a hit for The Revels), he co-composed "Six Pak" which was also a California hit. Knowles got his inspiration for the song from Darnold's taking four seconds to drink a beer. Along with The Revels, Knowles provided music for the Kent Mackenzie directed 1961 film, The Exiles which was about Native Americans living in Los Angeles. Years later he recalled some of the tracks they recorded for the film which included "It's Party Time" and possibly "Revellion". He stated that the song "Commanche" that was written for the movie was cut out. In 1962, The Sentinals released "Latin Soul" bw "Christmas Eve" on Era 3097. The A side was composed by Robert Hafner and the B side, a joint composition by Hafner and K.C. Reeth. Along with Tony Hilder, Knowles produced both sides. This was just one example of the Hilder, Knowles, Hafner involvement. In 1963, Surf Mania by The Surf Teens was released. In addition to producing the album, the album contained five compositions by Knowles.

In 1966, Knowles was out of the music business and became branch manager of an oil company. The company folded during the 1973 fuel crisis.

=== Later years ===
He played on the California Live album by Merrell Fankhauser which was released in 1991. Along with Sam Eddy and Tony Hilder, Knowles worked with Bob Irwin of Sundazed to aid in the 1994 release of Intoxica! The Best Of The Revels. Irwin had done the same with another surf producer John Hodge for a release by The Pyramids. In 1995, he was a member of the reformed version of The Centurians and they played at the 1995 Pier Fest at Huntington Beach. In 1997 Knowles played on the Bustin' Surfboards '97 album for The Tornados, on the track "Devils Tail". He recalled the difference in the recording session as it was back in 1962, compared to how it was in 1997.

=== Influence ===
Among the musicians that have been influenced by Knowles is Bill Swanson, sax player for surf band, The Eliminators.

== Management ==
Not long before The Impacts, a Del-Fi act had their California surf hit "Latin’ia", Knowles offered to manage them. In 1962, Knowles had introduced the group to Tony Hilder. By 1963, Knowles was managing The Sentinals, who at that time, according to the San Lus Obispo Telegram-Tribune were fast becoming as big a draw as the Four Seasons in the Valley area.

=== Record Producer ===
His label, Westco was in operation from around 1962 to 1965. The main purpose of the label was to have recordings played on air and to sell them to the larger record companies.

In the late 1990s, the Bacchus Archives record label got in touch with him about the Surf Teens' album he produced in 1963. The album was released on the budget Sutton label and was distributed by the rack jobbers at their usual outlets. Due to the budget type release of the original, there was no info on the record or the cover about the band. There was a rumor that Knowles had some unreleased recordings of the group which turned out to be true. The record was re-released on vinyl as a limited edition of 500 pressings.

=== Partial production list ===
Group / Act	Release	Catalogue	Year	Notes #
The Revels	"Revellion" / "Conga Twist"	Impact 22-IM, 22-IMX		Side A co-composed with Mark Hilder; Producer both sides
The Sentinals	Latin'ia / "Tor-Chula"	WCEB 23	1962	Producer both sides
The Sentinals	"Latin'ia" / "Tor-Chula"	Era 3082	June 1962	Producer for both tracks
The Sentinals	"Latin Soul" / "Christmas Eve"	Era 3097	December 1962	Both tracks co-produced with Tony Hilder
The Revels With Sam Eddy	"It's Party Time" / "Soft Top"	Westco WC-3 / WC-4		Producer both sides
Kenny Hinkles' Friends Kerry Hinkle	"The Bee" / "Over You"	Westco WC-5	1963	Producer both sides
Jeff Hamman And The Surf-Teens	"Moment Of Truth" / "Moonshine"	Westco WC-9	1963	Producer both sides
The Sentinals	"I've Been Blue" / "Hit The Road"	Westco WC 12	1964	Side b co-composed with J. Waller, The Sentinals; Producer both sides
The Revels	On A Rampage	Impact 1LP-IM	1964	

Group / Act	Release	Catalogue	Year	Notes #
The Surf Teens	Surf Mania	Sutton SSU 339	1963	Later released on Bacchus Archives BA 1127; Album producer
The Revels	On a Rampage	Impact 1LP-IMX	1964	Executive producer
