= Dave Myers and The Surftones =

- Origin: Southern California, United States
- Years active: 1962–1963
- Labels: Impact, Del-Fi
- Past members: Dave Myers; Bob Hurtly; Bob Morosco; Jon Curtis; Johnny Miller; Bob Colwell; Ross Van Kliest; Dennis Merrit; Bob Quarry; Johnny Curtis; Seaton Blanco

Dave Myers and The Surftones were a Southern California surf group who are most likely remembered for the few singles they recorded in the 1960s which include their cover of The Revels hit "Church Key" and their time at the Rendezvous Ballroom in Balboa, California.

== Group background ==
The Surftones were from Laguna Beach. The majority of the group had majored in music at college. Myers himself was a multi-instrumentalist. As well as playing guitar, he played steel guitar, tenor sax, trumpet and bongos. Their lineup in 1962 consisted of Dave Myers on lead guitar, Jon Curtis on rhythm guitar, Johnny Miller on bass guitar, Bob Hurtly on saxophone, and Bob Morosco on drums.

In 1962, Dave Myers and his group as well as another group called the Rhythm Rockers were regulars at the Rendezvous Ballroom in Balboa, California. They became the house band at the venue, having taken over from Dick Dale and his band.

Myers's father owned a store that was visited by Bob Hafner who was the partner of Tony Hilder. One day Hafner and Myers Sr. were having a conversation that got on to the subject of music. A short time later Hilder turned up. He came to one of their practice sessions and heard their version of "Church Key", a song he held the rights to. They would end up having two singles released on Hilder's Impact label. They were "Moment Of Truth" bw "Frogwalk" . They also covered The Revels hit "Church Key" bw "Passion" as Dave Myers and his Surf-Tones. 1963 the group played the 18 band battle of the bands at the historic Deauville Club in Santa Monica Ca.,Saturday night winner-recorded on vinyl album, and the Teen Fair at Burbank,Ca among many surf bands.’ In late 1963, drummer Bob Colwell

left the group. He was replaced by Ross van Kleist.[7] Also in late 1963, the group played at the Second Annual Surf Fair, held at the Santa Monica Auditorium. This live event was recorded live and released on the Impact label as Shake! Shout! & Soul.[8][9][10]

In 1964 Dave Myers and his group recorded a vocal single. After that he was playing instrumental music. In the mid-1960s, he recorded as the Dave Myers Effect, releasing an album called Greatest Racing Themes. It was later released on the Carole label in 1968. This album was produced by Larry Brown a/k/a Lawrence Brown who provided the music for the 1968 biker film, The Angry Breed.

== Venues ==
Other venues the group has played at include the San Clemente Ballroom. They also played at the Harmony Park Ballroom in Anaheim, California at the request of Dick Dale. Dale, who had an almost unblemished attendance record, was unable to perform so he asked Myers and his group to fill in for him on that occasion.

== Later years ==
Their cover of "Church Key" is on the ultimate surf music playlist by SurferToday.com. In the 1980s, a Southern Californian surf music band called Kerry & The Surftones had based their name on, or had on Dave Myers and The Surftones as inspiration for their name.

== Lineup ==
=== 1962 ===
- Dave Myers ......... lead guitar
- Bob Hurtly ........... sax
- Bob Morosco ...... drums
- Jon Curtis ........... rhythm guitar
- Johnny Miller ...... bass

=== Later ===
- Dave Myers ......... lead guitar
- Bob Colwell ......... drums
- Ross van Kliest ... drums (replaced Bob Colwell)
- Dennis Merrit ....... sax
- Ed Quarry .......... piano
- Johnny Curtis ...... rhythm guitar
- Seaton Blanco ..... bass

== Discography ==
Singles
| Title | Release info | Year | Notes |
|---|---|---|---|
| "Moment of Truth" // "Frogwalk" | Impact 20-IM | | |
| "Church Key" // "Passion" | Impact 27-IMX | | |
| "Gear!" // "Let the Good Times Roll" | Wickwire 13008 | | |

Albums
| Title | Release info | Year | F | Notes |
|---|---|---|---|---|
| Hangin' 20 | Del-Fi DFLP-1239 | 1963 | LP | |

Various artist compilation appearances
| Title | Appears on | Release info | Year | F | Notes |
|---|---|---|---|---|---|
| "Aqua Limbo" "Laguna Limbo Luau" | Surf's Up! At Banzai Pipeline | Northridge Records NM101 | 1963 | LP | |
