= Surfin' Guitars: Instrumental Surf Bands of the Sixties =

1988 book

- Author: Robert J. Dalley
- Language: English
- Publisher: Surf Publications
- Publication date: 1988
- Publication place: United States
- Media type: Print
- Pages: 421

Surfin' Guitars: Instrumental Surf Bands of the Sixties is a book by Robert J. Dalley which covers the instrumental side of the surf genre in the 1960s and looks at groups and artists from that era. It has been published three times with the first version published in 1988 and the third in 2015. It has been quoted and referred to multiple times in books relating to surf music.

== About the book ==
The book was originally published in 1988. It consists of 421 pages and is divided into 41 chapters and each chapter chronicles a music group. It also gives a discographical study on the bands in the chapters.

Author Dalley, himself a musician started out interviewing two former members of the group, The Surfaris. His reason for seeking them out originally was to find out how to re-create the surf sound from the 1960s. The taped interview developed info the basis of an article. This was submitted to the record collector magazine Goldmine. He became a regular contributor the magazine and was interviewing bands. Later he decided to compile a book with a thorough history on surf music. In hunting down info, he had to enlist the help of a private detective to track down a band that was hard to find.

Artists in the book include Larry Samson of Jerry & The Diamonds, Dick Dale, The Challengers and the Invaders. The book also looks at "reverb" use in surf music.

== Editions ==
Releases
Title	Publisher	ISBN	Year	Notes
Surfin' Guitars: Instrumental Surf Bands of the Sixties (1st ed)	Surf Publications	9780913944042	1988	421 pages
Surfin' Guitars: Instrumental Surf Bands of the Sixties (2nd ed)	Popular Culture Inc	9781560750420	1996	364 pages
Surfin' Guitars: Instrumental Surf Bands of the Sixties (3rd ed)	Robert J. Dalley Publications	9780961394455	2015	420 pages
