= The Revels =

American rock band from California

- Origin: San Luis Obispo, California
- Genres: Surf; instrumental rock
- Years active: Mid to late 1950s - early 1960s
- Labels: Lynn Records, Impact Records
- Past members: Dan Darnold; Dave Davis; Sam Eddy; Brian England; Merrell Fankhauser; Norman Knowles; Jim Macrae; Gil Serna; Dean Sorensen; Paul Sorensen; Vince Tempesta

The Revels were an American rock band from California, associated with the 1960s surf music craze. They had hits with "Six Pak", and "Church Key" which was their most famous single.

== Background ==
The group started in the mid-to-late 1950s as a high school band in San Luis Obispo, California. They were originally called Gil Serna & The Rockets before changing their name to The Revels in 1959. Although their instrumental style predated the 1961-65 era of surf music, their success came during that period.

They are usually considered a "pre-surf" band and were the original Central California coastal instrumental band. Other bands from the area later included the more popular groups named The Sentinals and The Impacts.

Some of The Revels singles were collected on their sole album, Revels on a Rampage (1964) which was produced by Anthony John Hilder with the assistance of Howard Bowers and Norman Knowles.

Their 1961 song "Comanche" which was written by Robert Hafner has been featured on two soundtracks. It first appeared as the "Detoured Theme" in The Exiles (1961). It was later included along with several other surf music hits on the soundtrack of the film, Pulp Fiction (1994).

The group had been playing and appearing locally since 1957. They were originally part of a larger San Luis Obispo High dance band. From that a smaller group was formed to play Rock 'n' Roll. Their career took off when Norman Knowles took over as leader and changed their name from Gil Serna and The Rockets to The Revels.

== History ==
=== Gil Serna & The Rockets ===
They were five members who were part of an 18-piece San Luis Obispo high school dance band called The Dreamers. Breaking away from the band, they formed Gil Serna & The Rockets. This happened around Norman Knowles' third year at San Luis Obispo. He and the other members wanted to form their own combo to perform at dances and parties and make some money as well. An early line-up of the performing band Gil Serna & The Rockets, consisted of Serna on guitar, Sam Eddy on piano, Dan Darnold on guitar, Jim Macrae on drums and Knowles on sax. In 1957, there was a line up made up of Knowles, Serna, Jim Macrae, Darnold and Ron Fanunkin. With his graduation behind him and now a married man, Knowles was eventually elected as band leader in late 1958. Knowles was already handling a good deal of the band's bookings and business affairs. In early 1959, Knowles changed the name of the group to The Revels.

==== Members ====
- Dan Darnold: guitar, vocals
- Sam Eddy: piano
- Ron Fanunkin: saxophone
- Norman Knowles: saxophone
- Jim Macrae: drums
- Gil Serna: guitar
- Vince Tempesta drums
- Dave Davis guitar

=== Early years ===
In October 1959, the group released "Six Pak" bw "Good Grief" on Lynn 1302. The A side was written by Norman Knowles who had been inspired by Dan Darnold's reputation for drinking a beer in just four seconds.

Early in 1960, The Revels were in San Luis Obispo at a Chevrolet dealership, playing for a March of Dimes benefit. Tony Hilder had come into town to promote Billy Watkins and Charles Wright who were two of his artists. He was looking for a band to back his artists while on tour. Knowles wanted Hilder to think about The Revels as the backing band. Not that impressed, Hilder didn't consider them but still left his business card. The second time meeting Hilder was in the summer of 1960. The group had driven down to LA to record at a small studio located on the corner of Santa Monica and Western for what was their second recording session. The session wasn't going too good for the group so Knowles decided to ring Hilder to come over to help them with the experience he had. Soon Hilder arrived with Robert Hafner who was his partner and songwriter. Hilder was focused on guitarist Dan Darnold's playing around with the vibrato bar. Hafner helped with a melody centering around a hook with the vibrato. An arrangement was developed and later the title "Church Key" was given to the piece. Barbara Adkins, Hilder's girlfriend and future wife provided the giggles on the recording. Among the other tunes that Robert Hafner brought with him was "Vesuvius". The band learned it there and recorded it. Not having a label of his own at the time, Hilder and Norman Knowles started their own company as partners, splitting the costs as well as the profits.

=== Mid Years ===
In 1960, the group released "Vesuvius" bw "Church Key" on Tony Hilder's CT label. A single release on the same label by another artist could cause confusion as to that which act had the first release on the label as they share similar catalogue numbers. The catalogue number for "Vesuvius" bw "Church Key" on CT was 1-IM, 1-IMX. The other artist was Vi Hall. The release by Hall was a Robert Hafner, K.C. Reeth composition, "Endless Love" bw "It's Graduation Time", with the catalogue numbers, CT C-1, C-1X. In 1960, "Church Key" bw "Vesuvius" was released this time on Impact Impact 1-IM, 1-IMX. It was credited to The Revels with Barbara Adkins. The track featured an emotionless "Church Key", announcement, the sound of a beer can being opened and giddy laughter by Adkins. The August 1960 issue of Cashbox Magazine reported that Al Chapman of Modern Distributing had high expectations for a couple of singles. One of them was "Church Key" and the other was a release on the Spry label, "Tall Quiet Stranger", by Nick Green and Don Jackson. Later that year, Impact Records said in the November 26 issue of Cashbox that the track was starting to click in several midwest areas. In the December 24 issue of Cashbox, it was noted that The Gonzos had their version out on the Donna label and gave it a B+ rating while The Revels were making some noise with theirs. "Church Key" became a hit for The Revels.

Also in 1960, Serna left the band to join the Coast Guard. He was replaced by guitarist Save Davis.

In 1961, they released two singles, "Intoxica" bw "Tequila" and "Rampage" bw "Comanche", both on Impact. Then there was "It's Party Time" bw "Soft Top", released on Impact 13-IM, 13-IMX.

In 1962, they had another Impact single, "Revellion" bw "Conga Twist", which was their last Impact single release. Later that year was reported in the December 1, issue of Cashbox that Nico Records had acquired an instrumental of theirs from the Daco label. Nico records which had offices in Dallas and Hollywood was headed by Bobby Boris Pickett, Ned Ormand and R.B. Chris Christensen. The instrumental by The Revels was to be Nico's first release. They had some other singles were released on different labels, they were "Intoxica" bw "Comanche" on Downey D-123 and "It's Party Time" bw "Soft Top" on Westco WC-3. In 1962, following their involvement with The Exiles, the group was looking to secure a deal for a film that they would star in. Sam Eddy had also taken over from Norman Knowles as the band leader. Then in late 1962, Eddy and Dean Sorensen were drafted into the military. Knowles had also left the group to pursue his own ventures. This signalled the end of the group.

In 1964, their album On a Rampage was released on Impact LP-IMX.

=== Later years ===
Norman Knowles, who co-owned the Westco record label with Tony Hilder, moved into management, managing The Sentinals. In addition to being their manager, he had also been a member of the group. By 1966, he was out of the music business and was branch manager of an oil company. In 1989, he was working as an Amtrak ticket agent, and had his own 200-acre ranch near King City in the central California area. In the 1990s, he was involved in music again, playing on Merrell Fankhauser's 1991 California Live album. By the mid-1990s, he was a member of the reformed version of The Centurians. In 1997 he played on "Devils Tail" a track from the Bustin' Surfboards '97 album for The Tornados.

Serna would later become an actor. He appeared as Lt. Suarez in Che! in 1969. Also in television shows such as The Wild Wild West, episode "The Night of the Spanish Curse" in 1969 as Fernandez, and in the 1970s with Kojak, episode " Requiem for a Cop" as Sandro, Police Story, episode "The Man in the Shadows" as Luis Ortega and others.

In 1990, Sam Eddy was contacted by a friend from Chicago, Jim Fichter who was hoping to get a copy of their original LP, Rampage. This started off something and Eddy was able to contact Dean Sorensen and Norman Knowles. Then with minimal effort involved, they were playing night clubs, county fairs, car club meetings as well as shows. In 1993, Eddy was again contacted again by Fichter who put him in touch with Bob Irwin of Sundazed music. Just like Irwin had done with John Hodge, manager for The Pyramids and their recordings, the same was done for Intoxica! The Best Of The Revels, which was released on Sundazed LP 5010 in 1994 with the assistance of Eddy, Norman Knowles and Tony Hilder.

James "Sticks" Edward Macrae aka Jim Macrae died on January 12, 2017.

== Band members ==
- Norman Knowles (saxophone)
- Dan Darnold (rhythm guitar, 1959–60)
- Merrell Fankhauser (rhythm guitar)
- Brian England (bass)
- Sam Eddy (piano)
- Jim Macrae (drums)
- Gil Serna (lead guitar, 1959)
- Dave Davis (lead guitar, 1960)
- Dean Sorensen (lead guitar, 1961–62)
- Paul Sorensen (rhythm guitar, 1960–62)
- Vince Tempesta (drums, 1962)

== Discography ==
Act	Title	Catalogue	Year	Notes #
The Revels	"Six Pak" / "Good Grief"	Lynn 1302	1959	
The Revels	"Church Key" / "Vesuvius"	CT 1-IM / 1-IMX	1960	
The Revels with Barbara Adkins	"Church Key" / "Vesuvius"	Impact 1-IM / 1-IMX	1960	
The Revels	"Intoxica" / "Tequila"	Impact 3-IM / 3-IMX	1961	
The Revels	"Rampage" / "Comanche"	Impact 7-IM / 7-IMX	1961	
Guiseppi Apollo, The Revels, The Mapes Sisters	"All Because of You" / "Bright Star"	Impact 12-IM / 12-IMX	1961	
The Revels	"Party Time" / "Soft Top"	Impact 13-IM / 13-IMX	1961	
The Revels	"The Monkey Bird" / "Revellion"	Impact 22-IM / 22-IMX	1962	
The Revels	"Conga Twist" / "Revellion	Impact 22-IM / 22-IMX	1962	Note "Conga Twist" / "Revellion" & "The Monkey Bird" / "Revellion" share the same cat no.
Sam Eddy and The Revels	"Skip to My Lou" / "Lonely Walk"	Daco Records 702	1962	
The Revels with Sam Eddy	"It's Party Time" / "Soft Top"	Westco WC-3	1962	
The Revels	"Intoxica" / "Comanche"	Downey D-123	1964	

Albums
Title	Catalogue	Year	Notes #
On a Rampage	Impact LPM NO. 1	1964	
Intoxica! The Best of The Revels	Sundazed LP 5010	1994	Compilation; Also released on compact disc, Sundazed SC 11020
