= Merrell Fankhauser =

American singer, songwriter and guitarist

Merrell Wayne Fankhauser (born December 23, 1943, Louisville, Kentucky, United States) is an American singer, songwriter and guitarist, who was most active in the 1960s and 1970s with bands including the Impacts, Merrell & the Exiles, HMS Bounty, Fankhauser-Cassidy Band, and Mu. In addition, 12 songs recorded by Merrell & the Exiles were later released under the group name Fapardokly, even though that group never actually existed.

== The Impacts ==
After moving to San Luis Obispo, California in his teens, he began playing guitar, and got his first break playing in movie theaters and talent shows. In 1960, after one of these shows, he joined a local band The Impacts as lead guitarist. Their Ventures-influenced sound developed a strong following at the start of the surfing scene.

In 1962, the saxophone player from The Revels (Norman Knowles) met Merrell and his bandmates after a show at The Rose Garden Ballroom, and convinced them to record a session with Tony Hilder at a backyard studio in the Hollywood area. As much as this seemed like a notable event for the band, it was more of a lure than a lucky break. After recording the songs "Wipe Out," "Fort Lauderdale," "Tears," "Revellion," "Blue Surf," "Impact," "Steel Pier," "Tandem," "Sea Horse," "Beep Beep," "Lisa," and "Church Key," the recordings were taken by Norman Knowles and Tony Hilder to Del-Fi Records, where owner Bob Keene signed the album for immediate release. Knowles and Hilder never revealed to the band how much money they made by doing this, however, they also tricked the young band into signing a contract for one dollar. Merrell and his band was unable to collect royalties on this music for 36 years thereafter, as Hilder and Knowles claimed both artist and publishing royalties with Del-Fi Records. Merrell would encounter many more of these so-called song sharks during his musical career, although he and his bandmates were wiser after this hard lesson.

== Fapardokly ==
Fankhauser left the band and moved to Lancaster, California. There he met Jeff Cotton (later of Captain Beefheart's Magic Band), and in 1964 they formed The Exiles. The band — which also included John "Drumbo" French — had some regional success with songs including "Can't We Get Along", but then broke up. Fankhauser moved back to the coast, formed a new band, Merrell and the Xiles, and had a minor hit with "Tomorrow's Girl" in 1967.

An album followed, which included old Exiles songs and newer psychedelic folk material. For the album the band was credited as Fapardokly, taking its name from the surnames of the original members — Fankhauser, Dan Parrish (bass), Bill Dodd (guitar) and Dick Lee of The Brymers (drums). Despite its later cult acclaim, the album was not a success.

== HMS Bounty ==
Fankhauser and Dodd then formed another, more overtly psychedelic, band with Jack Jordan (bass) and Larry Meyers (drums), naming it HMS Bounty. They won a recording contract with Uni Records, and their self-titled album was released in 1968, followed by the single "Tampa Run". However, success was again thwarted, by personal and record company problems, and the band split up.

== Mu ==
Reuniting with Jeff Cotton in 1970, Fankhauser then formed Mu. In 1971, their first album was released and became a radio hit. Increasingly fascinated by legends of the lost continent of Mu, Fankhauser then relocated to the Hawaiian island of Maui in February 1973.

Material for a second Mu album was recorded on Maui in 1974, but not released until the 1980s on the two LPs The Last Album (Appaloosa, Italy 1981) and Children Of The Rainbow (Blue Form, US 1985). Mu disbanded in 1975. Fankhauser recorded a solo album, Maui (1976), before returning to California in the late 1970s. All his 1970s recordings have been reissued repeatedly in the CD format.

== Later solo work ==
Fankhauser continued to record, occasionally with friends including John Cipollina, Pete Sears, and later Ed Cassidy of Spirit in The Fankhauser Cassidy Band, as well as producing new surf albums credited to The Impacts. Fankhauser has also produced radio and TV shows such as his long-running Tiki Lounge.

In June 2015, Fankhauser released an mp3 rock album titled Signals from Malibu.
