= Sundazed Music =

American independent record label

- Founded: 1989
- Founder: Bob Irwin, Mary Irwin
- Distributor: Exceleration Music
- Genre: Garage rock, surf music, psychedelic rock
- Country of origin: U.S.
- Location: Coxsackie, New York
- Official website: www.sundazed.com

Sundazed Music is an American independent record label founded and based in Coxsackie, New York. It was initially known as a 1960s-centric surf, garage, and psychedelic rock label. Over time with the additions of imprints such as Modern Harmonic, Americana Anthropology, Beat Rocket, Dot Matrix Recordings, and Liberty Spike Recordings, their reach spans most genres and many decades while still firmly rooted as an archival label.

== History ==
Label founders Bob Irwin and his wife Mary started the label in 1989. Irwin's skill at restoring old vinyl records for the (then new) CD format attracted the attention of major labels, who increasingly solicited him to help them re-issue material from their back catalogs. He helped Sony Music release their archival Legacy Records label. Later, his restoration work included early material by the likes of Bob Dylan, Nancy Sinatra, and the Byrds. Irwin also worked at Arista for a time.

The first Sundazed releases were The Great Lost Knickerbockers Album! (1989) by the Knickerbockers and Western Union by the Five Americans, and reflected Irwin's personal preference for garage rock and surf music. Later releases included the albums of the Turtles, the Challengers, Liverpool Five, and Jan and Dean's long-lost album Save for a Rainy Day. The company reissued the complete catalog of LPs by New Orleans funk pioneers the Meters on vinyl and CD. The label later ventured into country music, including extensive reissues of Capitol Records albums by Buck Owens and other acts including Jimmy Bryant. Sundazed also issued vintage jazz guitar albums through their Euphoria label.

== Reissues ==
While Sundazed does license many of their releases from labels including Universal Music Group, Sony, and Rhino, they do a large amount of licenses direct with the artists or the artists' estates.

Additionally, Sundazed Music has purchased catalogs over the years. These catalog purchases include the 1995 purchase of the 1966 Jan And Dean concept album Save For A Rainy Day from Dean Torrence, the 1996 purchase of The Golden State Recorders studio masters, the 2000 acquisition of both the Edison International label (home to the Music Emporium and the recordings of Abnak Records, the home to the Five Americans, Bobby Patterson and Jon and Robin. In 2002, they purchased the Best Records, United International, Cedwicke and Wickwire catalogs, including the recordings of the Pyramids and the Daisy Chain. In 2019, they purchased Salem, Oregon-based Garland Records. In 2021, they acquired the exclusive rights to the Shiloh Records (Safe At Home by the International Submarine Band, the Kentucky Colonels) catalog. In 2021, they also purchased an extensive tape archive of the Kay Bank Studios to strengthen their partnership with the Trashmen.

In 1995, Sundazed released a 20-track CD by the Pyramids, Penetration! The Best of the Pyramids. Bob Irwin worked closely with John Hodge, the manager and producer for the Pyramids. Hodge owned the masters for the original recordings, which included the unissued music. Hodge also had a strong love of the music. Irwin was also planning a second release of their work. It was to be a "Lost Pyramids" album of unreleased material. He also did the same for the Revels, the Impact Records recording artists who had a hit with "Church Key". Working with The Revels' original music director Tony Hilder and band members Sam Eddy and Norman Knowles, he had their work which was recorded years before re-released.

They reissued Oar by Skip Spence in 1999.

Sundazed reissued the Columbia Moby Grape albums, but were immediately forced to withdraw the first three albums due to legal disputes involving the band's ex-manager Matthew Katz. In 2009, they signed Morly Grey to reissue The Only Truth, which came out on Sundazed SC 11216. Also that year, they released the long-lost Columbia sessions by the group Love.

On June 24, 2018, it was reported that Sundazed Music would be reissuing Mike Nesmith's recordings with First National Band, originally released after The Monkees' television series was canceled in 1969. The band's three albums, Magnetic South, Loose Salute, and Nevada Fighter, were originally recorded and released on RCA Victor between 1970 and 1971 featuring Nesmith on guitar and vocals, with John Ware on drums, John London on bass, and O.J. "Red" Rhodes on pedal steel guitar.

== New releases ==
In 2015, after a conversation with former Kentucky Headhunters guitarist Greg Martin about "Groovy Grubworm", an old instrumental record of which both were fond, Bob Irwin created subsidiary label Sundazed RFD, a label exclusively for instrumental 45 RPM recordings. "Groovy Grubworm" by Harlow Wilcox and the Oakies, "Shark Country" by the SloBeats (a band composed of Kenny Vaughan, Dave Roe and Maxwell Schauf) and "The Lonely Bull" by the East Nashville Teens were among the first records to be released by the new label.

== See also ==
- Category:Sundazed Music artists
- List of record labels
