= The Romancers =

American Chicano rock band

- Origin: Los Angeles, California, U.S.
- Genres: Chicano rock; garage rock; R&B; soul
- Years active: 1960s
- Labels: Magic Circle; Donna Records; Del-Fi; Linda; Dot; Prospect
- Spinoffs: Rhythm Playboys; Macondo
- Past members: Max Uballez; Andy Tesso; Richard Provincio; Manuel "Magoo" Rodriguez; Chris Pascual; David Brill; Manuel Mosqueda; Joe Whiteman; Armando Mora; Bobby Marty; David Bajorquez; Jimmy Pascual; Bobby Hernandez; Ralph Ventura; Cesar Valverde; Johnny Diaz

The Romancers were an American Chicano rock band from the Eastside Los Angeles who were active in the 1960s. The Romancers were the first East L.A. Chicano band to record an album and were the main influence of the mid-sixties East L.A. sound. The band made two albums on Del-Fi Records and a string of singles for Eddie Davis' Linda label. Max Uballez was the group's leader, chief songwriter, and rhythm guitarist.

== History ==
=== Origins ===
In early 1961, Max Uballez formed The Romancers in the mostly Hispanic Lincoln Heights section of Eastside Los Angeles; its members attended Lincoln High School and their manager was Billy Cardenas. Their name was inspired by posters and flyers promoting dances in the East L.A. area, which often read "Dance and Romance...this Saturday night." Uballez thought that seeing "Dance and Romance to The Romancers" would sound appealing on flyers.

For live performances, the band lineup was ever-changing. Uballez built the band from a group of musicians he worked with in Lincoln heights. In the beginning, The Romancers were Uballez on vocals and rhythm guitar, Richard Provincio on lead guitar and sax, David Brill on drums, and Manuel Rodriguez on bass. This group recorded. "You'd Better", "Rock Little Darlin", "I Found a New Love" with Robert and Rey, and "I'm Leaving It All Up To You" with he Heartbreakers.

The band recorded "Rock Little Darlin" at Frank Zappa's and Paul Buffs' studio in Cucamonga. Uballez returned to Cucamonga to record "Cradle Rock" and "Everytime I See You" with the Heartbreakers. Zappa played the lead guitar for this session.

Uballez formed The Romancerettes, a girls club to promote dances featuring The Romancers. The Romancerettes were led by Uballez's girlfriend Linda as the promotional arm for the Romancers band. Their first dance and show was at the GiGi hall in Lincoln Heights in 1962. "Little did they know...that this alliance intended to create work for themselves would set in motion a grassroots movement for bands in the barrios of East L.A. would evolve and grow into a network of layers that supported each other. This included musicians, youth social clubs, and community business owners (tailors, photographers, records stores) each contributing to the areas". "You'd Better" and "Rock Little Darling" got airplay at Los Angeles' KFWB. Uballez opened the door to airplay on KFWB and local Top 40 radio for the other groups of East Los Angeles.

The Romancers became the brand name that Uballez worked under as he was not interested in being a solo artist. Uballez changed The Romancers' lineup depending on the project he was working on and who was available. In essence, whoever played with Uballez was a Romancer. The record companies had a different view. Magic Circle Records released "You'd Better" as Max Uballez. Donna Records used Max Uballes, dropping the "z" from his name. They sometimes were promoted, as "Max Uballez or Maximillian and his Romancers Band".

The Romancers got so busy that they would sometimes split off into two groups to cover two different gigs. Uballez developed a style and a musical boot camp training an alternate Romancers band to cover other shows. Richard Provencio, Frankie Garcia, Billy Watson, and Johnny Diaz became the core of the alternate band. They would evolve into the Rhythm Playboys. As other musicians flowed through The Romancers, they absorbed Uballez's style and later contributed it to other bands.

=== Del-Fi Records ===
The release of "Rock Little Darlin" on Donna Records caused legal problems, and Uballez was prohibited from recording as a vocalist for five years. He approached Bob Keane about recording his band instrumentally. Keane agreed to one four-hour recording session without ever reviewing the music. Uballez composed the "Slauson Shuffle" and "All Aboard". For the "Slauson Shuffle" recording, Uballez changed the band's lineup. He envisioned a smooth sax, Freddy King telecaster, and cowbell with his usual semi-Latin feel. Uballez played rhythm guitar, Manuel Mosqueda on drums, Chris Pascual on bass, Mora on sax, and Andy Tesso on lead guitar. The band was so well rehearsed that they finished recording in less than a half hour. Keane turned to Uballez and said, "What else you got kid?"

Uballez took his bandmate's warm-up riffs and added a few bars and a couple of solos, giving them credit as composers. "Huggies Bunnys" was a scale that Tesso played to warm up Uballez expanded it and they had a track. Jimmy Meza of the Atlantics recalled working with Uballez in 1965, saying, "I remember exactly where we recorded 'Beaver Shot'. We went to a mansion up in Pomona and in one of the rooms, they had all of this recording equipment. Well, Max made it up right there on the spot. He voiced out the parts for the bass player, then he had me follow him on the guitar, then he told the horns what to do. I swear he created it right there on the spot." All the musicians Uballez worked with were accustomed to him bringing in new music for gigs. He would hum their parts and they would play it that night. So, it was not a stretch to do this in the studio. They recorded Do The Slauson in about four hours. It was the first album released by an Eastside band.

Do The Slauson was influential on other East L.A. bands such as The Premiers and The Blendells. The album featured a cover of "Patricia" by Perez Prado and "Huggie's Bunnies", written by lead guitarist Tesso. Tesso's guitar style influenced with many players in East L.A. "Huggie's Bunnies" was named after Eastside disc jockey Huggy Boy, and was later recorded by The Blendells and the Ambertones, another East Los Angeles band the Ambertones. "Slauson Shuffle" was another standout track; its chord structure provided the template for The Premier's hit record "Farmer John." It was named after the popular dance, the Slauson, and it provided the band with a local hit. The success of Do the Slauson prompted Del-Fi to follow it up with another instrumental album, Let's Do the Swim on their Selma label. The Swim was the name for another 1960s dance craze.

As a result of The Romancers' success, other Chicano artists recorded for the Del-Fi such as the Heartbreakers, Ronnie & the Pomona Casuals, and the Sisters. The Romancers incorporate vocal groups into their live show, including the Heartbreakers, Sisters, and the Slauson Brothers. In 1963, The Romancers backed the Heartbreakers on the song, "Every Time I See You", composed by the then-unknown Frank Zappa who also played lead guitar.

=== Linda Records ===
The Romancers began to record as the featured house band at the legendary El Monte Legion Stadium and had a falling out with their manager, Billy Cardenas, over the band's working with a certain promoter. As a result of this situation, Uballez and Cardenas split. Uballez continued with The Romancers. Tesso and Mora left with Cardenas and the rest of the band stayed with Uballez and continued their engagement. The Romancers went on to work with Chuck Berry, Little Stevie Wonder, The Motown Review, Johnny "Guitar" Watson, The Four Seasons, and more.

The Romancers were spotted by Eddie Davis while doing a show at the Rainbow Gardens in Pomona. In 1964 they began to record for one of Davis' labels, Linda Records, named for Uballez's wife. The Romancers were the first East L.A. band to work with Davis, who went on to record many other Eastside bands throughout the 1960s. The band would record a string of singles for the label. On these records, the Romancers began to use vocals. Their first single for the label was "Don't Let Her Go". In 1965 the followed it up with, "My Heart Cries", then later that year the pounding garage rocker "Love's the Thing".

In 1966, The Romancers released the single "She Give Me Love", followed by "She Took My Oldsmobile". Later that year, Dot Records picked up two songs the band recorded at Linda, "The Smoke Rings" and Love's the Thing" and released them on a single, which also appeared on the Prospect label.

== Impact ==
Rampart Records' Eddie Davis, the leading producer of Chicano rock and roll at that time, came to rely on Uballez's creativity the way Berry Gordy relied on Smokey Robinson at Motown.

Uballez wrote songs (sometimes uncredited) for the Romancers, the Premiers, Cannibal & the Headhunters, and the Atlantics. He co-produced the Romancers' Linda singles with Eddie Davis, as well as records by Little Ray, Cannibal & the Headhunters.

Uballez produced and arranged Cannibal and the Headhunters' famous recording of "Land of a 1000 Dances," complete with the "Na Na Na Na Na" opening, landing the group a spot on The Beatles' 1965 United States tour.

== Post breakup ==
=== Tesso ===
Tesso joined The Mixtures, a multi-racial group from Oxnard, and worked with Cannibal & the Headhunters. He toured with The Blendells and sang background on The Premiers' hit record, "Farmer John." In 1965, while Tesso was playing with Cannibal & the Headhunters, he was drafted and served in the Vietnam War. He left six weeks before Cannibal & the Headhunters' spot on The Beatles' tour. When Tesso returned from the army, he got married and retired from music, becoming a California state plumbing contractor. In 1995, Tesso joined a re-formed Cannibal & the Headhunters and later played with the Tribal Rockers. In 2002, Tesso returned to Cannibal & the Headhunters and has been active with them since.

=== Uballez ===
In the early 1970s, Uballez formed the band, Macondo, recording an album for Atlantic Records. He subsequently worked with younger Chicano artists such as Quetzal, Lysa Flores, and La Banda Skalavera. He worked on music for the films Boulevard Nights (1979) and Borderline (1980).

In 2001, Uballez produced No Esta Mal by La Banda Skalavera on Makz Records. He was on the production team of the 2010 documentary Chicano Rock! the definitive documentary about the East LA music scene from the 1960s through the 1980s. In 2011, Uballez released the CD Prosperity and its single, "Me and You I Do", on Makz Records. In 2016, Uballez authored the book Chuy de Cabra The Journey Home El Chupacabra. Uballez now lives in Nevada and is CEO of XELA-CO MEDIA, a music promotion, and production company.

=== Reissues ===
The album, The Slauson Shuffle by The Romancers was re-issued in 1995. Two of The Romancers' songs are included on The Eastside Sound CD issued by Dionysus Records in 1996. In 1999, eight of The Romancers' singles were included on Varèse Sarabande's four-volume CD set, East Side Sound, Volumes 1 thru 4, which also includes recordings co-produced by Uballez for other Eastside bands.

== Members ==
=== Original members ===
- Max Uballez (guitar, vocals)
- Richard Provincio (lead guitar, sax)
- David Brill (drums)
- Manuel "Magoo" Rodriguez (bass, vocals)

=== Later members ===
- Andy Tesso (lead guitar)
- Chris Pascual (bass, vocals)
- Manuel Mosqueda (drums)
- Joe Whiteman (saxophone)
- Armando Mora (saxophone)
- Bobby Marty (saxophone)
- David Bajorquez (saxophone)
- Jimmy Pascual (lead guitar)
- Billy Watson (bass)
- George Avila (drums)
- Louie Davila (saxophone)

=== Linda Records years ===
- Max Uballez (producer, guitar, vocals)
- Bobby Hernandez (guitar, vocals)
- Manuel "Magoo" Rodriguez (bass, vocals)
- Ralph Ventura (sax, trumpet, vocals)
- Manuel Mosqueda (drums, vocals)
- Cesar Valverde (saxophone)
- Johnny Diaz (guitar, vocals)

== Discography ==
=== 45 rpm ===
- "You'd Better" b/w "Butterball" (Magic Circle 4226, 1962)
- "Slauson Shuffle" b/w "All Aboard" (Del-Fi 4225, 1963)
- "Don't Let Her Go" b/w "I Did the Wrong Thing" (Linda 117, November 1964)
- "My Heart Cries" b/w "Tell Her I Love Her" (Linda 119, 1965).
- "Love's the Thing" b/w "Do You Cry" (Linda 120, August 1965)
- "She Give Me Love" and "Take My Heart" (Linda 124, February 1966)
- "She Took My Oldsmobile" b/w "That's Why I Love You" (Linda 125, June 1966)
- "The Smoke Rings" b/w "Love's The Thing" (Dot 16975, 1966) (Prospect 101, 1966)

=== Albums ===
- Do the Slauson (Del-Fi 1245, 1963)
- Let's Do the Swim (Selma 1501, 1963)
