= Anthony J. Hilder =

American filmmaker, host and broadcaster

- Born: Anthony John Hilder; November 30, 1934; Ojai, California, United States
- Died: April 26, 2019 (aged 84); Santa Monica, California, United States
- Other name: Tony Hilder
- Occupations: Radio host, film producer, record producer
- Known for: Record production in the surf music genre 9/11 Truth and New World Order theories
- Parent(s): Dorothy Granger (stepmother); John Hilder (father)
- Website: www.freeworldfilmworks.com

Anthony J. Hilder (November 30, 1934 - April 26, 2019) was an American author, film maker, talk show host, broadcaster, news correspondent and former actor. In the late 1950s to the mid-1960s he was also a record producer, producing music mainly in the surf genre. He headed a couple of record labels as well as working for various others. He was also a publisher.

== Background ==
He was born on November 30, 1934, to Jack and Patricia Hilder. His education was at prep school in Ojai, California, and later at University High in West Los Angeles. He majored in film and communications at USC where he later attended.

In the late 1950s, he was known as Tony Hilder and performed A&R work for Modern Records. In the early 1960s Hilder became a prolific producer of surf music. According to Who Put the Bomp magazine, Hilder's name as publisher, producer etc., appears on many records, both 45s and albums. His name would have appeared on more if it wasn't for the poor crediting on the budget releases. As a producer, he produced records such as Jim Waller's "Surfin' Wild". He was credited as producer on the Surf Battle various artists album. He produced the Bombora album by the Original Surfaris. He supervised the recordings of the Revels, a California group remembered for the instrumental hit "Church Key". He was also the president of Impact Records, a label that released recordings by The Revels, Lil' Ray and the Premiers and Dave Myers and the Surftones. He had a role in providing the music for the 1961 film, The Exiles.

In 1971 Hilder was ejected from Lou Gordon's television interview show. He was also interviewed by the Idaho-based Times News that year and voiced his strong opposition to property taxes and the system of education in America. Hilder believed Ronald Reagan was a tool for the bankers by the mid-1970s; previously he had supported him. He also had further issues with Reagan. In the mid-1990s, Hilder hosted the Radio Free World radio show in Los Angeles. Also in that period, he was hosting his syndicated television show, Millennium 2000.

Hilder hosted radio shows and at one stage had a radio show in Alaska.

Hilder became involved in conspiracy films from the early 1990s. His films include Illuminazi 9-11 which featured Jordan Maxwell, Clayton Douglas and Ted Gunderson who Hilder has been associated with. Other films include Panic Project, 911 : The Greatest Lie Ever Sold. and Skull & Bones.

He was a news correspondent for the American Free Press, and a freelance writer. He was also a part of the alternative media.

A speaker at Conspiracy Con, he was described by The Silicon Valley Voice as a favorite fact finder for many conspiracy theorists.

== Actor ==
In the late 1950s Hilder had minor or supporting roles in a few feature films and television shows.

In 1957, he was at his early stage in getting acting work. In December that year, he was in "The Trail to Christmas" episode of General Electric Theater. He also appeared in M Squad that year. Along with Robert Hafner, Hilder had a role in the 1958 sci-fi film, The Hideous Sun Demon which was directed by Tom Boutross and Robert Clarke.

== Music and record producer ==
Hilder had a prolific output as a producer in the surf genre. He's mentioned and referenced in books such as Surfin' Guitars: Instrumental Surf Bands of the Sixties by Robert J. Dalley, and various other surf music related publications. He is also credited with bringing the surf sound to a host of independent California record labels in the early 1960s. According to Who Put the Bomp magazine, Hilder was responsible for more local surf music being recorded and released than any other individual. Years later his status as a producer in the surf genre was acknowledged in a 1995 issue of CD Review. Records released on other labels such as Del-Fi Records and Challenge Records credit Hilder as either orchestra leader, publisher, or writer. He had also used the pseudonym of Mark Hilder.

=== 1950s to early 1960 ===
In the late 1950s, Hilder worked for the Kent and Modern record labels. His time at Modern Records gave him contacts he could use in the music business. In 1959 having left the Kent / Modern organisation, Hilder would form CT Records, which would be his first record label. Two singles were subsequently released on CT. In time to come he would take advantage of the surf music craze. Hilder would become involved with Billy Watkins, Jesse Belvin and Charles Wright. With the assistance of Hilder, Wright penned "You're Unforgettable" for Billy Watkins. Released in 1959 on the Challenge label, it was backed with a Robert Hafner composition, "Rendezvous". It was given a B+ rating by The Cash Box in its October 17 issue. It was also a prediction that month by Billboard to do well, and became a local hit year. Hilder was also involved in the release of Rickey Agary's rocker single, "Everybody Needs Someone". Agary was backed by the Mark Anthony Band. The two part single was released on the Bel Canto label in 1959.

=== 1960s ===
The Revels

In 1960, his Impact label had its first release. The record was "Church Key" by the Revels, released on Impact 1. Hilder's association with the Revels began in early in 1960. One day, the Revels were at a Chevrolet dealership in San Luis Obispo, playing for a March of Dimes benefit. Hilder had come into town to promote two artists of his, Billy Watkins and Charles Wright. He was looking for a band to back them while on tour. Norman Knowles wanted him to think about using the Revels as the backing band. Not that impressed, Hilder didn't consider them. However he left his business card. The second time Hilder came into contact with the group was in the summer of 1960. The group had driven down to LA to record at a small studio located on the corner of Santa Monica and Western for what was their second recording session. The session wasn't going coming along that well so Knowles decided to ring Hilder to come over, and with his experience help them out. Soon Hilder arrived with his partner and songwriter, Robert Hafner. Hilder's attention was focused on guitarist Dan Darnold's playing around with the vibrato bar of his guitar. Hafner helped with a melody centering around the vibrato's hook. An arrangement was put together and later the title "Church Key" was given to the musical piece. Barbara Adkins who was Hilder's girlfriend (and later his wife) provided the giggles on the recording. Hafner brought some other tunes with him, one of which was "Vesuvius". The band learned it there in the studio and recorded it. Not having a label of his own at the time, Hilder and Norman Knowles started their own company as partners, splitting the costs as well as the profits. In 1960, the group released "Vesuvius" bw "Church Key" on Tony Hilder's CT label. Then it was later released on Impact, this time with "Church Key" as the A side. Hilder helped with much of the writing and arrangement for the 1961 film, The Exiles, a docu-drama about urban Indians from L.A. and with garage rock music provided by The Revels.

Other acts and recording ventures

In 1962, Hilder attended a practice session by Rendezvous Ballroom regulars, the Rhythm Rockers, and heard them doing their version of a song he held the rights to, "Church Key". They would have two singles released on Impact, "Moment Of Truth" bw "Frogwalk and "Church Key" bw "Passion". In late 1962, he reached out to a group called the Latin Knights in a bid to get them recorded. He did several sessions with them in the studios in L.A. He later changed their name to the Charades and signed them to his label. Two songs were released on Impact, "Sophia" and "Christina".

In 1963, he produced the album The Winners Of The 18 Band Surf Battle, which was released on the GNP Crescendo label. It included titles by the Rhythm Kings and Dave Myers & the Surftones.

In 1966, represented by attorney Al Schlesinger, Hilders company Anthony Music was involved in legal action with Del-Fi records, filing a $122,000 Superior Suit over breach of contract, fraud and money owned. This was over royalties not being paid as per an alleged agreement for the masters of various albums. This included recordings by The Centurians, Dave Myers and the Surftones, the Sentinels and an LP Battle of the Surf Bands. Also in the same year, Hilder approached Myron Fagan a playwright-director for information. He urged Fagan who was nearly 80 to pass on his knowledge of the CFR, Illuminati and its new world order plans so it could be preserved. In 1967, the result was an album called The Illuminati CFR. According to the book by Mark Jacobson, Pale Horse Rider: William Cooper, the Rise of Conspiracy, and the Fall of Trust in America, it was recorded at a studio where Hilder normally recorded the surf-rock groups. It was released as a 3 record set that Hilder produced.

== Anthony Music & Impact Records ==
=== Anthony Music ===
Hilder's music publishing company Anthony Music AKA Anthony Music Corp was based in Hollywood, California. The company handled releases such as "Commanche" / "Rampage" by the Revels, and their earlier release, "Church Key". Lil' Ray and the Premiers were another act to have the same. Others include, Emmett Lord, the Charades, Ray Agee, Bob Linkletter and the Sentinal Six.

=== Impact Records ===
During the 1960s, Hilder oversaw Impact Records, a Los Angeles-based record label. One of the functions of Impact Records was to be an outlet for masters that Hilder couldn't release on other labels. Much of the material released by the label was from local aspiring artists and bands. It was announced in the May 8, 1961, issue of Billboard that Hilder had put Dean Zook in a position to head the label's Midwest Radio-TV promotion. From his base in Denver, Zook's first efforts were concentrated on the promotion of the Revels' single which had been featured in the 1961 film, The Exiles. The Revels, a local Californian band, had been around since 1957. They had four singles released on the label from 1960 to 1962 which included the single they were best known for, their 1960 hit "Church Key". The single was distributed nationally by Liberty Records but was issued under the banner of Impact to keep the identity of the label. Another artist that had a release on the label was Latino singer, Little Ray Jimenez in 1962 with "Shake! Shout! & Soul!" bw "Soul & Stomp". Other artists included Shorty Bacon, and the Charades. Another artist to have a release on the label in 1962 was Rue Barclay who had been recording since the late 1940s. The following year Barclay appeared in a low budget film, The Skydivers. One album that Hilder produced for his Impact label was Shake! Shout! & Soul, which was recorded live at Santa Monica's 2nd Annual Surf Fair. It featured Lil Ray, The Original Surfaris, Dave Myers and the Surftones, the New Dimensions, Steve Korey and the Virtue Four.

Robert Hafner also worked on compositions with Hilder and for artists on Impact. Both Hilder and Hafner had previous involvement with their roles in the film The Hideous Sun Demon which was released in the late 1950s.

== Other labels ==
Westco was a label located in Morro Bay, California. It was one that Hilder co-owned with Norman Knowles. One act that had material released on the label was Jeff Hamman and the Surf-Teens. Other acts were Kenny Hinkle, Kenny Karter and the Sentinels. Westco started out as WCEB, a division of Impact Records.

== Music involvement in later years ==
In 1974, Hilder was approached by Ray Badarat from the Charades who had come to Los Angeles in search of the group's old master tapes. These were the tapes that Hilder had produced ten years earlier. After catching up about old times, Hilder offered an opportunity for the group to do a musical score for a film, Black Lolita. From that they recorded the love theme for the film. Hilder provided the liner notes for the single "XKE" by Boss Martians which was released in 1993. In 1994, Intoxica! The Best Of The Revels was released on Sundazed LP 5010. Just as John Hodge, the manager / producer for the Pyramids worked with Sundazed's Bob Irwin to get the product out, so did Hilder, Sam Eddy and Norman Knowles. Hilder's voice is featured on the track "Radio Free World" which was included on the various artists album Audium Capsule 1, released in 1996. His voice was sampled and appears on the track "A Sorrowful Empire" by the group Haunted By Rivers on their Drain the Sky album released in 2008.

== Political ==
=== 1960s to 1970s ===
In 1964, Hilder was involved with Barry Goldwater and his presidential campaign. At the time, he considered Goldwater to be the most honorable and courageous candidate he'd ever seen. Hilder put together a record album for the Goldwater camp called Stars for Barry.

According to the "Orange County Home of Richard Nixon, Disneyland and rightists" article by Kay Bartlett in the March 16, 1974 issue of The Free Lance-Star, Hilder was a self-proclaimed new-rightist and his book War Lords of Washington argued that international bankers conspired to involve America in World War II. He said that London, New York and Washington were the seat of the international cartel which wanted to dominate the world.

By 1976, Hilder who was once a staff member of Senator George Murphy had now become a force in the Liberty Lobby.

=== 1980s to 1990s ===
In the late 1980s, he was a member of Citizens Against Organized Crime which was based in Arizona.

In July 1988, there was a movement taking place within the National Rifle Association of America by some of its members to oust President George H. W. Bush from the association. Bush was a lifetime member and according to the article that ran in the Chicago Tribune, he had no intention of leaving the association. Hilder, who led the petition drive in Alaska, said that petition drives were underway in 23 states. Hilder was at a weekend gun show collecting 400 signatures according to St. Louis Post-Dispatch. Hilder claimed that just one NRA member could call the expulsion of another if he alleged there was a violation of NRA bylaws. One such bylaw was that members protect and defend the Constitution. Hilder also went into the committee's process and how it would handle the alleged offence.

In June 1993, Hilder was kicked out of the studio at KLAV for his remarks about Janet Reno's alleged relationship to Cult Awareness Network (CAN) which had a role in the whistleblowing of the Branch Davidians in Waco, Texas. He remarked that President Bill Clinton was the "velvet" on the iron fist of Commu-Fascism and he should be impeached.

== Radio and television host ==
As a TV host he has hosted the Millennium 2000 TV series. During 1967, he had a radio show on Pacifica KPFK 90.7 FM. He also hosted two radio shows, Radio Free World and Radio Free America. He's also responsible for the creation of Radio Free America. By 1989 he was hosting a radio show in Anchorage, Alaska, in a similar position to what he was doing in California the previous year. His Radio Free America show was broadcast on KEAG. Around the mid-1990s, he was hosting his controversial show in Los Angeles. His past radio show guests have included ufologist, Norio Hayakawa. His controversial side was noted in a two part Anchorage Daily News news article about him that ran from October 11 to October 12, 1992.

== Contributions ==
- Hilltop, Friday April 9, 1976 - Page 2, U.S. Dollar Sentenced to Death

== Written works ==
- The Warlords of Washington Secrets of Pearl Harbor), an interview with Col. Curtis Dall ISBN 9780935036435 Fullerton, Calif. Educator Publications, 1972

== Debates & television appearances ==
In the 1990s, Hilder debated Khalid Abdul Muhammad.

In 2011, Hilder appeared on the UK television show, On the Edge which was hosted by Theo Chalmers.

== Death ==
Hilder died at St. John's Hospital at Santa Monica, California. According to various sources, Hilder died on April 26, 2019. Ufologist Norio Hayakawa who has in the past been associated with Hilder, confirmed his death on his website with details of a memorial service to be held on May 10, 2019, from 2 p.m. at the Woodlawn Cemetery at the Sunburst Chapel in Santa Monica, California.

== Discography as producer / composer credits etc. ==
=== Recordings ===
Artist	Track	Album	Catalogue	Year	Notes #
Anthony J. Hilder & Evan Sweetwater	"Ordo Ab Chao"		American United		Rap track
Anthony J. Hilder & Evan Sweetwater	"A M E R I K A"		American United		
Anthony J. Hilder	"Radio Free World"	Audium Capsule 1	Blanc Records – BLCCD14	1996	Various artists album
Drain The Sky	"A Sorrowful Empire"	Haunted By Rivers	Level Plane Records LP114	2008	LP (Sampled voice)

=== Record Producer ===
Group / Act	Album title	Catalogue	Year	Notes #
Various artists	Surfs Up! At Banzai-Pipeline	Northridge Records NM 101	1963	Producer Tony Hilder
Jim Waller and the Deltas	Surfin' Wild	Arvee A 432	1963	Producer Tony Hilder
Various artists	Surf Battle	GNP Crescendo GNP 85	1963	Producer Tony Hilder
Various artists	Shake! Shout! & Soul! Recorded Live at the Second Annual Surf Fair / Santa Monica, California	Impact LP #2	1963	
Various artists	Surf War	Sundazed 6081	1995	Producer Anthony J. Hilder
Al Garcia and the Rhythm Kings	Exotic And Rockin' Instrumentals	Bacchus Archives BA1135	1999	Original Sessions producer Tony Hilder
Various artists	Lost Legends of Surf Guitar	Sundazed Music LP 5420	2012	(Tony Hilder Producer on: A2, B1, B3, C3, C4, C5); A2: The Ebb Tides - "Big Noise From Waimea", B1: The Tandems - "The Rising Surf", B3: The Original Surfaris - "Surfs Up", C3: The Surf Teens - "Point Surf", C4: The Centurions - "Ishamatsu", C5: The Original Surfaris - "Exotic"

==== Non music album ====
Artist	Album title	Catalogue	Year	Notes #
Barry Goldwater	The Man and The Issues	American United AU-1X	1964	Producer Anthony J. Hilder
J. Evetts Haley	A Texan Looks At Lyndon: A Study In Illegitimate Power	American United AU-3x / AU-3	1964	
Strom Thurmond	The Great Senator Strom Thurmond Republican	American United AU-4x		
Billy James Hargis	The Cross & Sickle	American United AU-6X	1965	Introduction by Tom Anderson
Myron Fagan	Illuminati - C.F.R. (The Council On Foreign Relations); Volume 1	American United AU-7x / AU-7	1967	Producer Anthony J. Hilder
Myron Fagan	Illuminati - C.F.R. (The Council On Foreign Relations); Volume 2	American United AU-8x / AU-8	1967	Producer Anthony J. Hilder
Myron Fagan	Illuminati - C.F.R. (The Council On Foreign Relations); Volume 3	American United AU-9x / AU-9	1967	Producer Anthony J. Hilder
John Steinbacher	It Comes Up Murder	American United – AU-10x / AU-10	1967	Produced by Anthony Music Corporation
Myron Fagan	Red Stars Over Hollywood Volume 1	American United AU-11x / AU-11	1968	Producer Anthony J. Hilder
Myron Fagan	Red Stars Over Hollywood Volume 2	American United AU-12x / AU-12	1968	Producer Anthony J. Hilder
Myron Fagan	Red Stars Over Hollywood Volume 3	American United AU-13x / AU-13	1968	Producer Anthony J. Hilder
John Carradine	The Child Seducers	American United AU-14	1969	Producers, Anthony J. Hilder and Earl Stone
Colonel Curtis B. Dall	Communism, Big Money, And You...	American United – AU-17	1970	

=== Song writing credits ===
Artist	Title	Composition credits	Notes #
Gene Maltais With The Gibson String Band	"Gangwar"	Gene Maltais, Tony Hilder	
Aggie Dukes	"John John"	Aggie Dukes, Tony Hilder	
Anthony J. Hilder & Evan Sweetwater	"Ordo Ab Chao"	Anthony J. Hilder	
Dave Myers And The Surftones	"Passion"	Hafner, Hilder	
The Centurians	"Sano"	A. J. Hilder	
The Breakers	"Surfin' Tragedy"	Robert J. Hafner, Anthony J. Hilder	Also recorded by Doug Hume; Bob Vaught and the Renegades
Rhythm Kings	"The Soul"	Robt. J. Hafner, Anthony J. Hilder	
The Charades	"Please Be My Love Tonight"	Hilder, Chaves, Chaney	
Lil' Ray and the Premiers	"Shake! Shout! & Soul!"	Anthony J. Hilder	

=== Liner notes ===
Artist	Title	Release info	Release Year	Notes #
The Trashwomen	Lust	Hillsdale Records HR-45-1	1992	EP
Jackie And The Cedrics	"Soyokaze" / "Hurry Up"	Hillsdale Records HR-45-2	1993	
Boss Martians	"XKE!" / "I'm 'A One You Need"	Hillsdale Records HR-45-3	1993	
Johnny Legend	"Mexican Love" / "Pipeline" (Vocal)	Hillsdale Records HR-45-4	1993	
Jackie And The Cedrics	"Go! Honda Go!" / "Velocity Stacks"	Hillsdale Records HR-06	1994	
The Tiki Men	"Cattle Prod" / "Surfin' Senorita"	Hillsdale Records HR-08	1994	
King Normals	"Sugar Baby" / "Stop, Look & Listen"	Hillsdale Records HR-09	1994	

=== Film soundtrack ===
Film	Director	Release info	Credits	Notes #
The Exiles	Kent Mackenzie	1961	Music; Anthony Hilder, The Revels, Eddie Sunrise, Robert Hafner	

== Filmography ==
Title	Role	Director	Year	Notes #
The Gray Ghost Episode: An Eye for an Eye	Union Soldier	Hollingsworth Morse	1957	As Tony Hilder
M Squad Episode: The Watchdog	Juvenile Housebreaker	Robert Florey	1957	As Tony Hilder
General Electric Theater: Episode: The Trail to Christmas		James Stewart	1957	As Tony Hilder
Summer Love		Charles F. Haas	1958	
The Hideous Sun Demon		Robert Clarke	1959	As Tony Hilder
Polanski Unauthorized	Sharon's bodyguard	Damian Chapa	2009	As Anthony J. Hilder
Left Hand Billy in the Second Solution	Voice	Gabriele Zuccarini	2013	As Anthony J. Hilder

== Documentary ==
=== Hilder documentaries ===
In 1993, Hilder teamed up with Jordan Maxwell for the first time in Lucifer 2000. The film was about the American Illuminati's plan for global domination. Similarly, another documentary of Hilder's that was released in the 1990s was Millennium 2000. Featuring Ray Yungen, Terry L Cook and Jordan Maxwell, it was about the "One Party System", and looked at the supposed plan for World domination via the boardrooms of the Major Banking institutions. It also looked at the related symbiology. It also made the claim that "The One Party System" was run by and for the benefit and pleasure of the International Banksters. According to the 26 Jan 1995 issue of the Point Pleasant Register, a presentation of Millennium 2000 was being held at the Mason County Library on 26 January at 6:00 pm. The theme was current events and end times prophecies events. Also in 1995, Reichstag 95: An American Holocaust was released. It featured Ted Gunderson.

In 2001, Hilder released Illuminazi 911 which featured Jordan Maxwell, Ted Gunderson and Clayton Douglas. Released in 2001, and possibly the earliest of the 911 conspiracy type of films, the 86 minute documentary was asking who was really behind the attack on the World Trade Center. In 2003, Panic Project was out. Hilder is joined by Norio Hayakawa and Jordan Maxwell. They look at Area 51 and what may be going on there. His other documentary Area 51 was of a similar theme. In 2004, 911: The Greatest Lie Ever Sold was released. Running at just over two hours, it features news clips of the 9/11 tragedy and commentary by Hilder. In the film, Hilder attempts to present a Nazi world domination type of theory as for what may be behind the 9/11 attacks. In 2007, Skull & Bones: The Catholic Connection was released. It featured William David Cox, a former seminarian who had a 30-year history at uncovering attacks on the Catholic faith. The film presented a theory that a NeoCon Nazi cabal was behind the control of the US currency and commerce as well as Christianity. His documentary Illuminazi Bilderberg West Bohemian Grove was released in October 2011. In 2012, he appeared in an episode of Jesse Ventura's Conspiracy Theory series.

=== Others ===
He appeared in two of Chris Everard's documentaries about the Illuminati, The Illuminati and The Illuminati II: The Antichrist Conspiracy. In addition to Hilder and Jordon Maxwell, Alex Jones and David Icke were also featured in The Illuminati which explored topics such as elections, the Bohemian Club, the Skull and Bones society and freemasonry. In the sequel The Illuminati II: The Antichrist Conspiracy, which also featured Jones, Maxwell and Icke, the film looked at the fixing of the 1992 presidential election, the Free Tibet campaign, Aleister Crowley & the Evil Eye and the Manhattan Project. Hilder appeared in the Andre Eggelletion documentary Thieves in the Temple, a film about the privately owned banks which was released in 2005.

=== Director and producer ===
Title	Year	Role	Notes #
E.U. Hitler's Dream Come True	2010	Director	
Bohemian Grove	2011	Director, co-producer	
Man Against the Machine, the movie		Producer	

=== Free World Film Works filmography ===
Title	Year	Role	Notes #
666 Mark of the Beast		Producer	
911: The Greatest Lie Ever Sold		Producer	
Air Auschwitz		Producer	
Alien 51		Producer	
Beast of the Bible Belt		Producer	
China's Answer to Cancer		Producer	
Frankenfed: The Monster Among Us		Producer	
illumiNAZI 911		Producer	
IllumiNazi Bilderberg West Bohemian Grove		Producer	

Title	Year	Role	Notes #
Lucifer 2000		Producer	
Millennium 2000	1993	Producer	
New World Odor		Producer	
None Dare Call it Murder		Producer	
Oklahoma Atrocity		Producer	
Panic Project		Producer	
Reichstag 95		Producer	
Skull & Bones: The Catholic Connection		Producer	

=== Appearances in other documentaries ===
Title	Year	Director	Producer	Role	Notes #
The Illuminati Vol 1 – All Conspiracy, No Theory	2005	Chris Everard	Enigma Motion Pictures	Himself	
The Illuminati Vol 2 - The Antichrist Conspiracy	2006	Chris Everard	Enigma Motion Pictures	Himself	
Wake Up Call: New World Order	2008	John Nada		Himself	
Illuminati Records	2017	Oliver Marshall	Vince LeGrow; Oliver Marshall	Himself	

=== Guest on show ===
Title	Year	Director	Producer	Role	Notes #
The Nutrimedical Report Show - Hour One Hot News	2009		Dr. Bill R. Deagle MD	Himself	Feat.Gary Richard Arnold & Anthony J Hilder
Conspiracy Theory with Jesse Ventura Season Three, Episode #4: The Ozarks	2012		Jesse Ventura; Allan Chaykin, Kaluska Poventud	Himself	

Publication	Release date	Article title	Page	Link
Times News	Sunday, March 7, 1971	Farm 'terrorism' seen	Page 2	link
The Owosso Argus-Press	August 9, 1971	TV Host Clips a Right-Winger	Page 13	Link
Los Angeles Free Press	August 4, 1972	"Free Rightist Interview"	Part Two, Pages 6 to 8	
Who Put the Bomp	No.14, Fall 1975	"The Tony Hilder Story"	Page 12 - 13	link
Anchorage Daily News	October 11, 1992	"The Aliens are Coming …"		
Anchorage Daily News	October 12, 1992	"Saucers are Swooping Around U.S. …"; Welcome to Anthony J. Hilder, part 2		
The Observer	May 21, 1995	"Cults 2" By Ed Vulliamy		link
Rare L.A. Tracks (West Coast Style Vintage R&B And Doo-Wop, 1956–1964) Bacchus Archives 1134	1999		Liner notes	link
