= 1996 U.S. Taxpayers National Convention =

1996 Constitution National Convention
- 1996 presidential election
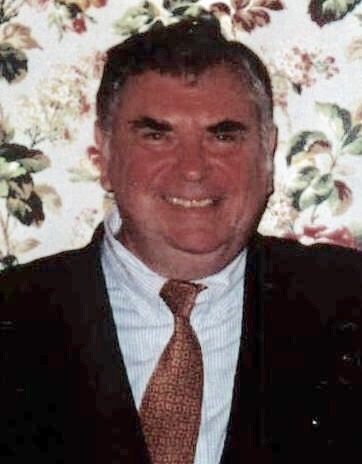
- Presidential nominee (Phillips)

Convention
- Date(s): August 15–16, 1996
- City: Coronado, California
- Venue: Hotel del Coronado

Candidates
- Presidential nominee: Howard Phillips of Virginia
- Vice-presidential nominee: Herbert Titus of Oregon
- Results (president): H. Phillips: 393 (92.8%); C. E. Collins: 20 (4.8%); P. Buchanan: 5 (1.2%); T. Gunderson: 5 (1.2%)
- Ballots: 1

The 1996 U.S. Taxpayers Convention was held August 15–16, 1996, at the Hotel Del Coronado in Coronado, California. It saw the party nominate Howard Phillips for president and Herbert Titus for vice president.

== Logistics ==
The second-ever presidential nominating convention of the U.S. Taxpayers Party was held on August 15 and 16, 1996, at the Hotel del Coronado in Coronado, California. The convention had been scheduled to run as late as August 18, if necessary.

The convention was held in a close suburb of San Diego, the site of that year's Republican convention (held August 12–15).

== Nominations ==
Many in the party had attempted, ultimately unsuccessfully, to persuade Pat Buchanan to run as its nominee. It was hoped that Buchannan, as the party's nominee, could offer voter's a conservative alternative to the Republican Party's presidential nominee, Bob Dole. Buchanan declined overtures from the party to be its nominee.

Ultimately, the party re-nominated its 1992 presidential nominee Howard Phillips, with Herbert Titus being nominated for vice president.

Runner-up Charles E. Collins, after losing to Phillips, alleged that the convention had been rigged.

Another contender was Lawrence Ray Topham, an activist against paper currency and the Federal Reserve who claimed to have walked to the San Diego convention from Salt Lake City while fasting.

1996 U.S. Taxpayers Party National Convention presidential vote
Candidate	Votes	Percentage
Howard Phillips	393	92.83%
Charles E. Collins	20	4.81%
Ted Gunderson	5	1.18%
Pat Buchanan	5	1.18%
Diane Beall Templin (California)	0	0%
Totals	423	100%

== Speeches and other proceedings ==
Rhetoric at the convention opposed most facets of government. A heavy amount of rhetoric was espoused against abortion, faulting the federal government for not acting to prohibition abortions. Another frequent target of criticism at the convention was participation of United States troops for United Nations peacekeeping missions was frequently condemned, characterized as tyrannical and a threat to United States sovereignty.

A vast array of conspiracy theories were espoused at the convention. Party communications director K.B. Forbes announced his resignation in reaction to this, noting that, while he agreed with the policy positions of the party, he did not wish to associate with the "nuts" he had witnessed attending its convention.

One of the main speakers of the convention was Texan Daniel New, father of Michael G. New (a troop who had been discharged after refusing to wear a United Nations insignia while deployed on a peacekeeping mission). Larry Pratt, head of Gun Owners of America, delivered a speech in which he argued that gun control could enable genocide in the United States. Other notable guests and speakers at the convention included Alan Keyes (former Reagan administration official who had run for the Republican presidential nomination) and Evan Mecham (former governor of Arizona, removed via impeachment).
