= Thee Midniters =

American rock group

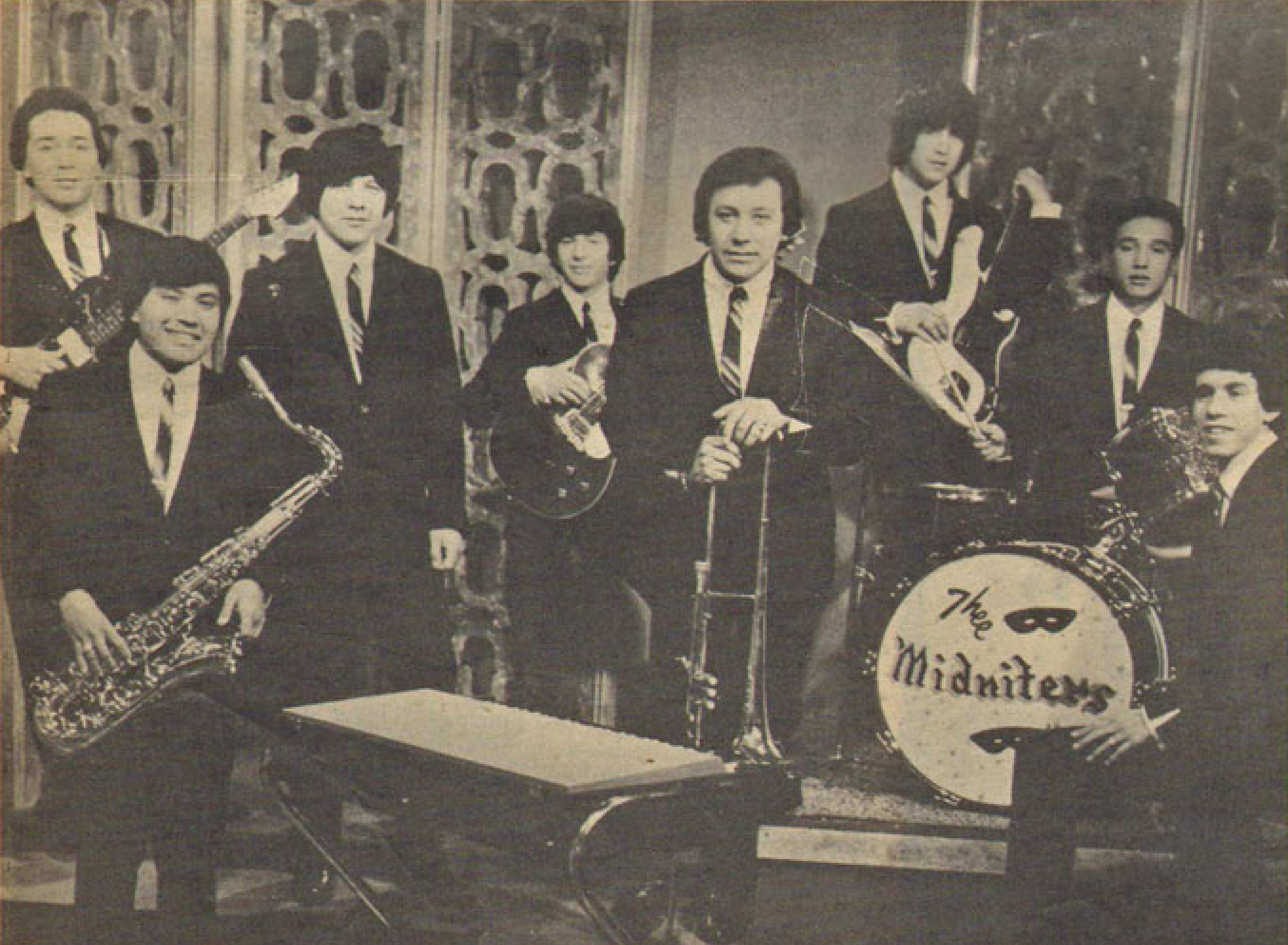
- Thee Midniters in 1965

Background information
- Origin: East Los Angeles, California, US
- Genres: Rock
- Years active: 1960–1970
- Labels: Chattahoochee; Whittier

Thee Midniters were an American rock group formed in East Los Angeles in 1960. They were among the first Chicano rock bands to have a major hit in the United States. They were one of the best known acts to come out of East Los Angeles in the 1960s, with a cover of "Land of a Thousand Dances" that charted in Canada in 1965, and an instrumental track "Whittier Boulevard" in 1965. Thee Midniters were among the first rock acts to openly sing about Chicano themes in songs such as "Chicano Power" and "The Ballad of César Chávez" in the late 1960s. They broke up in 1970.

The band was promoted by Dick "Huggy Boy" Hugg on local radio station KTYM in Inglewood, California and also by his fill-in Godfrey Kerr. Huggy Boy was also a popular DJ on KRLA.

== Achievements ==
Thee Midniters are a 1960s band from East Los Angeles influenced by "surf music to rhythm and blues to Mexican music," embodying a Chicano identity, a "mixture of Mexican heritage but living in America." The band was one of the first to integrate horns, an unusual combination of trombone and sax, congas, keyboards and electric guitars to produce a sound similar to better known bands popular in the late 1960s such as Chicago and Blood, Sweat & Tears.

Most band members attended Salesian High School located near the corner of Whittier Boulevard and Soto Street in the Boyle Heights section of Los Angeles. George Salazar, the drummer on the first album, attended Garfield High School. Rhythm guitar player, Roy Marquez, also attended Garfield High School. Danny LaMont, the drummer on all subsequent recordings attended Montebello High School and sax player Larry Rendon attended Cantwell High School.

Thee Midniters were largely school trained, highly professional and musically sophisticated in comparison to many of the surf bands of the day. Willie Garcia and Thee Midniters were regarded in the East LA of the 1960s as The Beatles on a smaller scale, though they sounded (and still sound) more like a big, soul-gospel review group with a hefty dose of salsa.

Casey Kasem, a well-known disc jockey, said, "They were the best band I ever hired". Kasem filled a regular slot on KRLA top forty radio in the 1960s and promoted concerts and dances at the time.

Thee Midniters continue with a combination of original and new members and appeared in Raven Productions' PBS pledge break special Trini Lopez presents the Legends of Latin Rock, along with El Chicano, Tierra and Gregg Rolie (of Santana and Journey fame) in the spring of 2009.

== Band members ==
Thee Midniters were an East LA band. For a brief period of time the lead singer for the group was Little Ray aka Ray Jimenez. In 1964, Jimenez left the group. Willie Garcia, aka "Little Willie G.", then took over as the lead singer. Garcia took obscure soul ballads such as "The Town I Live In" or "Giving Up On Love" and gave them his own special delivery. Garcia, after years away from the band, returned in the 1990s. The lead guitarist was George Dominguez, whose forte was blues rock. Cesar Rosas, later to gain fame as one of the leaders of Los Lobos, would stare at George on stage to see how Thee Midniters' guitarist played leads and riffs that Rosas could not figure out on his own. Roy Marquez played rhythm guitar. Trombonist Romeo Prado was the band's music arranger and was a huge influence on the overall sound of Thee Midniters.

Guitarist Bobby Cochran, nephew of Eddie Cochran, played guitar through several incarnations of Thee Midniters. Cochran would later go on to join Steppenwolf and the Flying Burrito Brothers, among others, and also co-founded Bobby and the Midnites, a nod to his time with Thee Midniters.

Thee Midniters have continued to play through the decades under the leadership and management of bassist Jimmy Espinoza and saxophonist Larry Rendon, the two original players remaining in the line-up from the original 1960s group. Since 2006, they have featured Gregory Esparza as lead vocalist along with longtime Midniter mainstays through the years such as Bob Robles on lead guitar, Aaron Ballesteros playing drums, Bobby Navarrete on sax, Bobby Loya on trumpet, Samuel Trujillo on trumpet and valve trombone and Bob Luna playing keyboards. Eddie Torres was the Producer of every original album that was recorded in the 1960s; he also designed their album covers. Moreover, Eddie Torres was Thee Midniters Manager for many years.

== The name ==
Thee Midniters adopted the unusual "Thee" to avoid the possibility of a legal challenge from the established R&B group of a somewhat earlier era, Hank Ballard's "The Midnighters".

== Recordings ==
In 1962 Lil' Ray & The Midniters recorded "Loretta" and "My Girl" for Tony Hilder's Impact label. The song was actually a title change of the Smokey Robinson composition "My Guy" which was a hit for Mary Wells. In 1964 they released a cover of "Land of a Thousand Dances" which had been a hit by both Chris Kenner and Cannibal & the Headhunters and subsequently, by Wilson Pickett. In 1969, they released the single "Chicano Power".

== Discography ==
=== Studio albums ===
- Thee Midniters – Chattahoochee Records C-1001 (Mono), Whittier Records WS-1001 (Stereo) – 1965
- Love Special Delivery – Whittier W-5000 (Mono), Whittier WS-5000 (Stereo) – 1966
- Unlimited – Whittier W-5001 (Mono), Whittier WS-5001 (Stereo) – 1967
- Giants – Whittier WS-5002 (Stereo) – 1969

=== Lil' Ray and The Midnighters singles ===
- "Loretta" / "My Girl" – Impact 30 – 1962

=== Thee Midniters singles ===
- "Land of a Thousand Dances" (Parts 1 & 2) – Chattahoochee 666 – December 1964
- "Land of a Thousand Dances" (Part 1) / "Ball of Twine" – Chattahoochee 666 – January 1965 [re-release] (#67 US Billboard) (#42 RPM)
- "Sad Girl" / "Heat Wave" – Chattahoochee 674 – March 1965
- "Whittier Blvd." / "Evil Love" – Chattahoochee 684 – June 1965 (#127 US Billboard)
- "Empty Heart" / "I Need Someone" – Chattahoochee 693 – September 1965
- "That's All" / "It's Not Unusual" – Chattahoochee 694 – October 1965
- "Brother, Where Are You" / "Heat Wave" – Chattahoochee 695 – October 1965
- "I Found a Peanut" / "Are You Angry" – Chattahoochee 706 – February 1966
- "Love Special Delivery" / "Don't Go Away" – Whittier 500 – May 1966
- "It'll Never Be Over for Me" / "The Midnite Feeling" – Whittier 501 – 1966
- "The Big Ranch" / "Dragon-Fly" – Whittier 503 – November 1966
- "The Walking Song" / "Never Knew I Had It So Bad" – Whittier 504 – February 1967
- "Everybody Needs Somebody" / "Never Knew I Had It So Bad" – Whittier 504 – February 1967
- "Looking Out a Window" / "Jump, Jive and Harmonize" – Whittier 507 – June 1967
- "Tú Despedida" / "Chile Con Soul" – Whittier 508 – 1967
- "Breakfast on the Grass" / "Dreaming Casually" – Whittier 509 – 1967
- "You're Gonna Make Me Cry" / "Making Ends Meet" – Whittier 511 – 1968
- "The Ballad of Cesar Chavez" / "Le Copla De Cesar Chavez" – Whittier 512 – 1968
- "Chicano Power" / "Never Going to Give You Up" – Whittier 513 – 1968
