= The Hollywood Saxons =

American vocal group

- Also known as: The Capris; The Portraits; The Tuxedos
- Origin: Los Angeles, California, United States
- Genres: Doo wop
- Years active: 1958–1968
- Labels: Elf, Swingin'
- Past members: Stan Beverly; Bill Brooks; Joe Lewis; Charles Taggart; Maudice Giles; Nathaniel "Buster" Wilson; Eugene Church

The Hollywood Saxons were a Los Angeles R&B group who recorded under various other names. They were well known on the LA R&B circuit. Their recording history ran from the late 1950s to the late 1960s. Their discography is complex due to the various names they recorded under and labels they recorded on.

== Background ==
The group came about as a result of some basketball playing friends who would sing in the showers after a game. As a result of their singing and liking the activity, they formed a group. The group came to formation around midway through 1956. It consisted of Stan Beverly on lead, Bill Brooks on second tenor, Joe Lewis on Baritone, and Charles Taggart on bass. Bill Brooks left the group after nine months and was replaced by Maudice Giles. The group increased to a five-man group with the addition of bass singer, Nathaniel "Buster" Wilson. Charles Taggart then became first tenor. They were first called The Saxons and it was Joe Lewis who came up with the name for the group. They were also known as The Tuxedos when they recorded for the Forte label and The Capris for their recordings on the Tender label.

== Career ==
=== 1950s to 1960s ===
In 1958, as The Capris, the group had recorded a slow rocka-ballad "Endless Love" which was released on the Tender label. The song was written by K.C. Reath and Robert Hafner. The B side "Beware" was credited to Jesse Belvin & the Capris. Some years later it was released on the Impact label with "Luau" as the B side recorded by The Charades. This Capris group is sometimes confused with a (white) New York group of the same name.

By December 1962, they had a single "I'm Your Man" bw "It's You" out on Elf label.

At some stage in the 1960s the group broke up. Some of the members, Stan Beverly, Joe Louis and Charles Taggart would later reunite to perform for Doo-Wop Society shows.

=== 1970s to 1980s ===
As Speed Limit, Stan Beverly and Joe Lewis group recorded "There Goes My Baby" in 1972. Other singers on the recording were Carlton Beck on bass and Richard Botts on baritone.

After the mid-1970s, The Hollywood Saxons performed occasionally with the line up consisting of Stan Beverly, Joe Lewis, Maudice Giles and Bill Brooks. Beverly left at some stage to join one of the Ink Spots lineups. He was replaced by Melvin Ware.

=== 2000s ===
In 2000, the Hollywood Saxons were still performing with the group featuring original members Stan Beverly and Joe Lewis.

== Discography ==
=== Hollywood Saxons ===
Singles
| Title | Release info | Year | Notes |
|---|---|---|---|
| "Everyday's A Holiday" / "L.A. Lover" | Swingin' 631 | 1961 | |
| "Everyday's A Holiday" / "L.A. Lover" | Elf 101 | 1962 | |
| "Everyday Holiday" / "L.A. Lover" | Hareco 102 | 1962 | |
| "It's You" / "I'm Your Man" | Elf 103 | 1962 | |
| "Diamonds" / "The Tears Come Rolling Down" | Entra 1214 | 1963 | |
| "Everyday's A Holiday" / "L.A. Lover" | 20th Century Fox Fox 312 | 1963 | |
| "It's You" / "I'm Your Man" | Swingin' 615 | 1965 | |
| "Merry-Go-Round" / "Laughing Girl" | Swingin' 654 | 1968 | |
| "Loving You" / "Laughing Blues" | Action Pack 111 | 1968 | |

EPS
| Title | Tracks A | Tracks B | Release info | Year | Notes |
|---|---|---|---|---|---|
| Stan Beverly And The Hollywood Saxon's | "Every Day's A Holiday" (Accapella) "Do It Right The First Time" | "Please Be My Love Tonight" "Hey Girl" (Accapella) | Action Pac N.H.P. 2000 / N.H.P. 2022 | ???? | |

Albums
| Title | Release info | Year | Notes |
|---|---|---|---|
| The Hollywood Saxons Meet the Paradons | Milestone Mil-1000 | | LP album |
| Everyday Is a Holiday | Famgr 971012 | 1997 | Compilation CD |

=== The Capris ===
Singles
| Title | Release info | Year | Notes |
|---|---|---|---|
| "Endless Love" / "Beware" | Tender T 525 | 1959 | B side is Jesse Belvin and The Capris |
| "Endless Love" / "Luau" | Impact 34-IM / 34-IMX | 196? | |

Appearances
| Artist | Title | Track | Release info | Year | Notes |
|---|---|---|---|---|---|
| Various artists | Rare L.A. Tracks; West Coast Style Vintage R&B And Doo-Wop, 1956-1964 | "Endless Love" | Bacchus Archives BA1134 | 1999 | CD |
