= Todd Abramson =

American record label owner

- Occupations: Record label executive, club owner, disc jockey

Todd Abramson is a former record label owner, booking agent and nightclub owner.

== Background ==
Abramson was employed by Maxwell's, in Hoboken, New Jersey, 1986. By 1993, he was a partner in the running of the club. In 2017, Abramson was running his weekly radio show on Saturdays 3-6 p.m at WFMU-FM.

In March 2019, he was the moderator in a panel discussion about Hoboken musicians in the 1980s.

== Record label ==
Abramson formed Telstar Records, a Hoboken-based label which had been in operation since 1985.

In 1988, girl group the Pussywillows, who Abramson had help get gigs, had their Spring Fever album released on the label. They also recorded the song "Vindaloo" for the film Kill the Moonlight.

In 1996, the Fleshtones had their Hitsburg USA! album released on the label.

One record that was issued on the label was by Little Diesel and the Weasels. It was recorded in the summer of 1974 in a small space and on to a TEAC recorder. Mixed by the band members, the album was recorded one at a time onto eight-track cartridges and distributed to their friends. In 2006, having been re-mixed, it was reissued on vinyl and compact disc by Telstar.
