= Impact of soul music =

See:

- Blue-eyed soul (also known as white soul), is a slang music industry term for rhythm and blues and soul music performed by white artists.
- Brown-eyed soul, soul music created and performed in the United States mainly by Latinos in Southern California during the 1960s, continuing through to the early 1980s.
