= Jim Marrs =

American writer

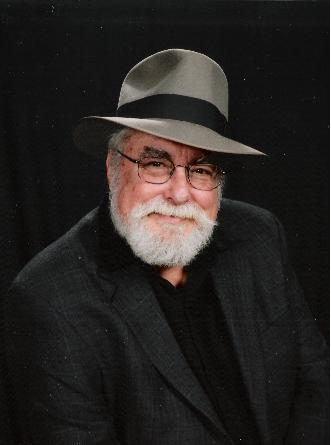
- Marrs in 2010
- Born: December 5, 1943; Fort Worth, Texas, U.S.
- Died: August 2, 2017 (aged 73); Springtown, Texas, U.S.
- Education: University of North Texas (BA); Texas Tech University
- Occupations: Journalist; Author

James Farrell Marrs Jr. (December 5, 1943 – August 2, 2017) was an American newspaper journalist and New York Times best-selling author of books and articles on a wide range of alleged cover-ups and conspiracies. Marrs was a prominent figure in the JFK assassination conspiracy theories community and his 1989 book Crossfire was a source for Oliver Stone's 1991 film JFK. He subsequently wrote books asserting the existence of government conspiracies regarding aliens, 9/11, telepathy and secret societies. He began his career as a news reporter in the Dallas–Fort Worth–Arlington metroplex and taught a class on the assassination of John F. Kennedy at University of Texas at Arlington for 30 years. Marrs was a member of the Scholars for 9/11 Truth.

== Early life and education ==
A native of Fort Worth, Texas, Marrs earned a B.A. in journalism from the University of North Texas in 1966 and completed graduate work at Texas Tech University in Lubbock, Texas from 1967 to 1968.

== Career ==
Beginning in college, he worked as a reporter, cartoonist, and photographer for several Texas newspapers, including the Denton Record-Chronicle, Lubbock Avalanche-Journal, and Lubbock Sentinel. In 1968, he took a position with the Fort Worth Star-Telegram, where he served as police reporter and general assignment reporter covering stories locally, in Europe, and in the Middle East. From 1969 to 1970, he concurrently served in a stateside United States Army Reserve intelligence unit (under the aegis of the Fourth United States Army) as a translator of French and German periodicals; when the Army offered to remedy a longstanding shoulder ailment prior to his scheduled mobilization or release him from his service obligation, he accepted the latter option. He later became the newspaper's military and aerospace writer and an investigative reporter. After leaving the Star-Telegram to take a position with Jerre R. Todd and Associates (a public relations firm in Arlington, Texas) in 1972, he returned to the newspaper in 1974 before leaving again in 1980.

For the remainder of his career, Marrs was a freelance writer, author, and public relations professional based in exurban Springtown, Texas. From 1983 to 1984, he published a weekly newspaper (the Springtown Current) in his hometown along with a monthly tourism tabloid (Cowtown Trails). Previously, he produced a cable television show (Texas Roundup) from 1982 to 1983. He also served as communications director for the First Bank and Trust of Springtown from 1985 to 1995.

Marrs appeared on ABC, NBC, CBS, CNN, C-SPAN, The Discovery Channel, TLC, The History Channel, Alex Jones Show, This Morning America, Geraldo, The Montel Williams Show, Today, TechTV, Larry King, Coast to Coast AM (with George Noory and Art Bell) radio programs, as well as numerous national and regional radio and TV shows.

== Opinions ==
=== Assassination of JFK ===
In 1989, Marrs's book, Crossfire: The Plot That Killed Kennedy, was published and reached The New York Times Paperback Non-Fiction Best Seller list in mid-February 1992. It became a basis for the Oliver Stone film JFK, released in 1991. He was interviewed for the 1992 documentary The JFK Assassination: The Jim Garrison Tapes, and on 18 November 1994 he testified at a public hearing of the Assassination Records Review Board in Dallas, Texas.

According to Stephen E. Ambrose in an essay generally critical of conspiracy theorists, Marrs wrote in Crossfire that motives for the murder of Kennedy were "Attorney General Robert F. Kennedy's attack on organized crime (Mafia motive); President Kennedy's failure to support the Cuban exiles at the Bay of Pigs Invasion (Cuban and C.I.A. motive); the 1963 Nuclear Test-Ban Treaty (military–industrial complex, or M.I.C. motive); Kennedy's plan to withdraw from Vietnam before the end of 1965 (Joint Chiefs of Staff and M.I.C. motive); Kennedy's talk about taking away the oil-depletion allowance (Texas oil men motive); Kennedy's monetary policies (international bankers motive); Kennedy's decision to drop Vice President Lyndon B. Johnson from the ticket in 1964 (L.B.J. motive) and Kennedy's active civil rights policy (Texas racist billionaires motive)."

Sylvia Meagher was a critic of the Warren Commission and author of Accessories After the Fact (1967) and Master Index to the JFK Assassination (1980). In April 1987, she received the manuscript of Marrs's Crossfire. She was asked to evaluate the book by Simon & Schuster, which was considering publishing it. Meagher concluded, "The accuracy of the manuscript in dealing with a vast body of complex evidence is nearly impeccable ... the manuscript is, in my opinion, a fine and admirable work." Despite this glowing recommendation, Simon & Schuster became one of about 25 major U.S. publishers to turn down the book. It was finally published in 1989 by Carroll & Graf Publishers.

Beginning in 1976, Marrs taught continuing education classes on the Kennedy assassination as an adjunct professor at the University of Texas at Arlington. He added a UFO course in 2000 before retiring from teaching in 2007.

=== UFOs and other topics ===
From 1992 to 1995, Marrs researched and completed a non-fiction book on a top-secret government program called the Stargate Project involving the psychic phenomenon known as remote viewing, only to have the program canceled as the book was going to press in the summer of 1995.

In May 1997, Marrs's investigation of UFOs, Alien Agenda, was published by HarperCollins Publishers. The paperback edition was released in mid-1998. It has been translated into several foreign languages and has become the top-selling UFO book in the world. Publishers Weekly said:

Marrs shows little discrimination, overemphasizing dubious phenomena like remote viewing and crop circles, and giving nearly equal weight to ludicrous pretenders like Billy Meier (who claimed close encounter with Pleiadians) and sophisticated commentators like Jacques Vallée. Marrs even devotes a chapter to theories that the moon may be a UFO, and he refuses to rule out obvious frauds like the alien autopsy tapes. But if rigorous analysis escapes Marrs, little else does; this is the most entertaining and complete overview of flying saucers and their crew in years.

In early 2000, HarperCollins published Rule by Secrecy, which claimed to trace a hidden history connecting modern secret societies to ancient and medieval times. This book also reached The New York Times Best Seller list. In 2003, his book The War on Freedom probed the alleged conspiracies of the September 11 attacks and their aftermath. It was released in 2006 under the title The Terror Conspiracy.

Marrs was a featured speaker at a number of national conferences including the annual International UFO Congress and the annual Gulf Breeze UFO Conference, but he also spoke at local conferences, such as Conspiracy Con and The Bay Area UFO Expo.

== Last years ==
In October 2011, Marrs started his own radio program, The View from Marrs, on the Jeff Rense Radio network. The program aired on Monday, Wednesday, and Friday at 3 p.m. Central time. Marrs had on his show a wide variety of guests and dedicated the entire month of November to the latest information regarding the JFK assassination. He also explored UFO research, survivalism, and other topics.

With a friend, Michael H. Price, Marrs wrote and illustrated a comic book (Oswald's Confession & Other Tales from the War) that was published by Cremo Studios, Inc., in 2012. In February 2013, Marrs's Our Occulted History: Do the Global Elite Conceal Ancient Aliens? was published by HarperCollins. Marrs usually also held a book signing at Brave New Books in Austin, Texas at least once a year.

== Private life, illness and death ==
Marrs's avocations included American Civil War reenactment, collecting Civil War memorabilia and researching the history of World War II. However, according to his wife, Carol, who met him on a blind date while they were students at the University of North Texas, "[H]e was almost a pacifist. He didn't believe we should be in a war unless you were defending your home."

In March 2017, an announcement was made on Marrs' official Facebook page about an unspecified illness that caused him to cancel appearances at two upcoming events: the 5th annual Out of this World UFO Conference in Edinburg, Texas, and the Free Your Mind Conference in Philadelphia, Pennsylvania, both in April.

In June 2017, additional statements were made about health issues Marrs was experiencing, including being on kidney dialysis at home and problems with his remaining good eye.

Marrs died on August 2, 2017, from a heart attack at age 73.

== Media ==
=== Books ===
- Crossfire: The Plot That Killed Kennedy. Basic Books. 1993. pp. 648. ISBN 978-0-88184-648-5.
- Alien Agenda: Investigating the Extraterrestrial Presence Among Us. William Morrow Paperbacks. 2000. p. 480. ISBN 978-0-06-095536-6.
- Rule by Secrecy: The Hidden History That Connects the Trilateral Commission, the Freemasons, and the Great Pyramids. William Morrow Paperbacks. 2001. pp. 480. ISBN 978-0-06-093184-1.
- Psi Spies: The True Story of America's Psychic Warfare Program. Career Press. 2002. p. 320. ISBN 978-0-9727131-0-8.
- Inside Job: Unmasking the 9/11 Conspiracies. Origin Press. 2004. pp. 240. ISBN 978-1-57983-013-7.
- The Rise of the Fourth Reich: The Secret Societies That Threaten to Take Over America. Harper Collins. 2008. pp. 449. ISBN 978-0-06-124558-9.
- Honegger, Barbara (2006). The Terror Conspiracy: Deception, 9/11 and the Loss of Liberty. Disinformation Books. p. 505. ISBN 978-1-932857-43-6.
- Above Top Secret: Uncover the Mysteries of the Digital Age. Disinformation Books. 2008. pp. 305. ISBN 978-1-934708-09-5.
- The Sisterhood of the Rose: The Recollection of Celeste Levesque. Disinformation Books. 2009. p. 386. ISBN 978-1-934708-29-3.
- The Trillion-Dollar Conspiracy: How the New World Order, Man-Made Diseases, and Zombie Banks Are Destroying America. Harper Collins. 2010. p. 468. ISBN 978-0-06-197068-9.
- Oswald's Confession and Other Tales from the War. CreateSpace Independent Publishing Platform. 2012. p. 150. ISBN 9781467951159.
- Our Occulted History: Do the Global Elite Conceal Ancient Aliens?. William Morrow. 2013. p. 609. ISBN 978-0-06-213031-0.
- Population Control: How Corporate Owners Are Killing Us. William Morrow. 2015. p. 384. ISBN 9780062359896.
- The Illuminati: The Secret Society That Hijacked the World. Visible Ink Press. 2017. p. 400. ISBN 9781578596195.

=== Videos ===
- Safespace — Winter 2006
- Fastwalkers — Winter 2006
- Lecture at Allen Public Library — Allen Texas, November 20, 2013
- Ancient Aliens and the New World Order — Writer, Host, and Star, 15 November 2014
- Dr. Grover Proctor Lecture with Jim Marrs Guest Speaker at 58:00 — Allen Texas, November 2015

=== Audio ===
CDs

- 16 Questions {Original CD is corrupted, no longer available.}

== See also ==
- Conspiracy theory
- Mark Dice
- James H. Fetzer
- David Ray Griffin
- Steven E. Jones
- Jeff Rense
- Aaron Russo
- Webster Tarpley
- Loose Change
- David Icke
- G. Edward Griffin
- Alex Jones
- Texe Marrs
