= Kill the Moonlight (disambiguation) =

Kill the Moonlight is a 2002 album by the rock band Spoon.

Kill the Moonlight may also refer to:

- Kill the Moonlight (film), a 1992 American independent film by Steve Hanft
- Let's Kill the Moonlight! (also called Let's Murder the Moonlight!; original title Uccidiamo il Chiaro di Luna!), a 1909 Futurist manifesto by Italian poet Filippo Tommaso Marinetti
