= The Charades =

US musical group

- Also known as: The Latin Knights
- Origin: Tulare, California, U.S.
- Genres: R&B, doo-wop, surf music
- Years active: 1960s most active, still going today
- Labels: Northridge, Impact, Äva, Original Sound, Charade Records
- Past members: Johnny T.Johnson; Syl Grigsby; Alex Pilkinton; Lavern Butler; Leon Baradat (until 1958)
- Website: charademusic.com

The Charades is a doo-wop, R&B group which was mostly active in California in the early to mid-1960s and has released a number of singles on various labels. One of the songs it recorded, which was associated with the surf genre, was "Surf 'n Stomp" on the Northridge label. The band also recorded for Tony Hilder's Impact label, and even had a release on a label owned by Fred Astaire. They had a minor hit with "Please Be My Love Tonight". The group, though it has been through some changes, still continues today, and has a history that spans six decades.

== Background ==
They started out in Tulare, California, in the late 1950s under the name The Latin Knights. The Charades were popular in the San Joaquin Valley in California doing local functions etc. As the Latin Knights, they recorded for both Swingin' and Weber Records labels. The recordings were not released. The name was changed to The Charades in 1962. By 1962, they had signed with Anthony J. Hilder. They had their first release on Northridge Records. Another label they had a release on was Äva Records which was owned by Fred Astaire. Hilder, who in those days was called Tony Hilder, is credited as co-composer and producer of "Please Be My Love Tonight" which was the A side of the single. Robert Hafner was credited as co-composer for the B side. Other 45 releases were on Original Sound Records and Impact Records.

Note: There was a group from Nashville bearing the same name that released a politically motivated single in 1966, "Hammers and Sickles" / "Left Wing Bird" - Monument 921. They were unrelated. They are also not connected with the surf group The Charades who released the singles "North west of Broken Hill" and "The lonely beach". That particular Charades group was an Australian act.

== Career ==
=== 1960s ===
Having released two singles in 1962, one on the Northridge label and another on Tony Hilder's Impact label, "Please Be My Love Tonight" b/w "Turn Him Down" was released on Äva in 1963. "Turn Him Down", which was written by Hafner and Reeth, was also recorded by The Cupons as "Turn Her Down" b/w "I'll Be Your Love Tonight" (by Materlyn And The Cupons) and released on Impact. In a short review of "Please Be My Love Tonight", Cashbox said in its December 28 issue that the group with its lovey-dovey song was dipping back into the teen-ballad harmony of some years back. A comparison to The Channels was made. It also said that the song could get some airtime headway. In February 1964, Mickey Wallach of MGM-Verve informed Cashbox that the song, plus "Mondo Cane #2" by Kai Winding along with some others, was getting a strong response. Also that year, a song they recorded, "Delano Soul Beat", appeared on the KPOI's Battle Of The Surfing Bands! compilation album which was released on Del-Fi Records. Also that year, "Take A Chance" b/w "Close To Me" was released on the Original Sound label. In May 1964, the band recorded two instrumentals under Tony Hilder's supervision. They were "Christina" and "Sophia". Also that year, Ray Baradat was drafted into the army. The group went back to Tulare County, playing local gigs until he returned.

Some time in 1967, the group was joined by Tom Johnston who stayed with them for a couple of years. He was replaced by guitarist Bobby Dennison. Johnston who would go on to become a member of The Doobie Brothers.

=== 1970s ===
In 1973 Ray Baradat went to Los Angeles to try to find Tony Hilder, who had produced for the group. He was wanting to see if there were any surviving recordings by the group that were left on tape. By that time Hilder was no longer in the music business. However, in a Santa Monica carport there were master tapes there and under cover. Hilder said to Baradat to take what he wanted, and see if he could release them if wished to. This also led to Hilder asking the group if they would be interested in recording some songs for a movie soundtrack. Two songs that were recorded by The Charades for the movie were "Bad Lolita" and "All My Love". "Bad Lolita" was the title song for the movie of the same name. It was a Blaxploitation film. The film Black Lolita featured Yolanda Love as Lolita, Anthony Mannino and Jefferson Richard. As a result of the session, they met Motown Records engineer/producer Art Stewart which resulted in them having a relationship with him and Motown. In 1976, the single "Corruption" was released. In the soul / funk genre, it was produced, co-composed and arranged by Art Stewart.

=== 1980s and 1990s ===
In 1983, Sally Watson joined the group and was the first female to join the ranks. In 1992, the group ceased performing full-time.

== Later years ==
In 2009, Ray Baradat had recently retired from the Tulare Joint Union High School District, which he had a career for the past 33 years. As of July that year, the group consisted of Ray Baradat, Syl Grigsby, Sally Hamilton, Bob Dennison, Gary Defoe, John Keith, Joe Luis and Hunt Graves. Also that month, from July 2 to August 30, an exhibit by Baradat was being held at the Tulare Historical Museum. It featured memorabilia of The Charades as well as other acts.

In its review of the 2012 compilation, Surf-Age Nuggets: Trash & Twang Instrumentals 1959-1966, Reverb Central gave "Sophia" a five star rating, mentioning the big surf tone and the marvelous progressional riff, also mentioning the perfect tone and composition.

In the Fall of 2017 they played their 2017 World Tour, One Night Only concert for the Class of 1962 reunion for Porterville High School.

The Charades, with original members Ray Baradat and Syl Grigsby, continue to perform and record. The group had a two-CD release in 2010, "Connections", and a release in 2015, "Echoes of Yesterday".

== Covering Charades ==
Kenny Vance recorded "Please Be My Love Tonight" which appears on his Acapella album, released in 2013.

== Members ==
- Johnny T.Johnson (tenor, lead)
- Syl Grigsby (falsetto, baritone, lead)
- Alex Pilkinton (bass, baritone, lead)
- Lavern Butler (baritone)
- Ray Baradat (tenor, baritone)
- Leon Baradat (Latin Knights only)

== Discography ==
=== Singles ===
List
Title	Label and cat	Year	Notes #
"For You" / "Surf 'n Stomp"	Northridge 2002	1962	
"Be My Love Tonight" / "Turn Him Down"	Äva 154	1963	
"Christina" / "Sophia"	Impact Records 32	1964	As Charades Band
"Luau"	Impact Records 34 (B-side only)	1964	As The Charades
"Take A Chance" / "Close To Me"	Original Sound 47	1964	
"All My Love" / "Bad Lolita"	Charade Records 501	1975	From the movie Black Lolita
"Corruption" / "Corruption" (Instrumental)	Charade Records 502	1976	

Shared singles
Artist & title A	Artist & title B	Label and cat	Year	Notes #
The Charades - "Please Be My Love Tonight"	Charlie And Ray - "Love You Madly"	Collectables "Back To Back Hit Series" COL 4040		
Admirations - "Bells Of Rosa Rita"	Charades - "Please Be My Love Tonight"	Popular Request 107		

=== Albums ===
List
Album title	Label and cat	Year	Format	Notes #
Corruption			LP	Produced by Art Stewart
Looking Like Love	Charade Records CLP 8702	1987	LP	
Looking Like Love	Charade Records CLP 8702	1987	Cassette	Engineered by Bryan "BC" Campbell
Looking Like Love		1987	CD	
Please Be My Love Tonight	Collectables COL-5728	1996	CD	
The Imaginations meet The Charades	Collectables COLCD 1438	2009	CD	Imaginations and the Charades
Connections	CCD-2010	2010	CD	Produced, engineered by Art Stewart
Echoes of Yesterday	CCD-2015	2015	CD	

=== Compilation appearances ===
EPs
Artist	Title	Label and cat	Year	Tracks	Notes #
Various Artists		Lucky Records		A1. "Cherry" (The Rivingtons), A2. "Please Be My Love Tonight" (The Charades); B1. "Everybody's Gotta Lose Someday" (The Del-Cords), B2. "A Slow Dance" (Ronnie And The Hi-Lites)	

Albums
Artist	Title	Label and cat	Year	Tracks(s)	Notes #
Various	Rare L.A. Tracks: Collection R&B & Doo Wop	Bacchus Archives 1134	1999	"Please Be My Love Tonight", "The Soul" "Take a Chance", "Surf and Stomp"	
Al Garcia and the Rhythm Kings with Tracks by the Charades Band	Exotic And Rockin' Instrumentals, 1963-1964	Bacchus Archives BA1135	1999	"Christina", "Sophia"	
Various Artists	Surf-Age Nuggets: Trash & Twang Instrumentals 1959-1966	Rockbeat Records ROC 3098	2012	Sophia	As Charades Band
