= Hassabi =

Hassabi is a surname. Notable people with the surname include:

- Demis Hassabis (born 1976), British artificial intelligence researcher and the CEO of Google DeepMind
- Maria Hassabi (born 1973), artist and choreographer
