= John Steinbacher =

- Born: John Adam Steinbacher; October 18, 1925; Foley, Alabama
- Died: October 9, 2015 (aged 89)
- Occupations: Reporter, author
- Years active: 1960s to 2000s
- Notable work: The Child Seducers, Wayfarers of Fate

John Steinbacher (1925–2015) was an American author and investigative reporter. His controversial book The Child Seducers was an attack on the state of education in America during the 1960s.

== Background ==
He was born to Joseph Steinbacher and Catherine Matyok in Foley, Alabama on October 18, 1925. He was educated at the Pacific University in Oregon.

His book, The Child Seducers, was a best seller.

Steinbacher had been a teacher in his time. For a decade he taught at Californian public schools until 1967. Then from 1967 to 1969, he had been a social worker for Los Angeles County Social Service. He had also been a newsman, radio announcer and author. He was also a member of the New York Academy of Sciences, the American Medical Writers Association, and the American Society of Association Executives. As a reporter he had worked for the Anaheim Bulletin. He also wrote a column for the paper, "School and Family". He was also a contributor to the monthly conservative newspaper, The Educator.

In 1972, he wrote an article about John G. Schmitz, supportive of him, "Who Will Vote for Schmitz?" in the October 5 edition of the Kerrville Mountain Sun. By 1974 he was the director of the National Justice Foundation.

== Sex education stance ==
In late March 1969, it was announced in The Los Angeles Times that the Parental Rights Committee (PRC) would pay for four speakers opposing family life education to come and speak. It was narrowed down to just one speaker, Steinbacher. He was scheduled to speak on Monday, March 31, at San Marino High School's theater. At another event the following month, Steinbacher had criticized Boy Scouts and Girl Guides, saying that they were transmission belts for getting sex education into schools.

== Releases ==
Steinbacher was an outspoken critic of sex education in America, and the organization USAID (U.S. Agency for International Development) in his book, The Child Seducers, which was published in 1970. The book was critical of the sex education programs in America. A record with the same title came out in 1969. It was produced by Anthony J. Hilder and Earl Stone for the World Christian Movement, and released on Hilder's American United label. In addition to Steinbacher's research for the album, the narration was provided by John Carradine.

== Discography ==
=== 7" ===
- John Steinbacher - Communism - Fact Records R-2104

=== 12" Albums ===
- John Steinbacher – It Comes Up Murder - American United AU-10x - 1967
- John Carradine – The Child Seducers - American United AU-14 - 1969
- John Steinbacher – Bitter Harvest: A Documentary Drama From The Explosive Best Selling Book - I.S. Productions for Orange Tree Press, Inc. - 1970

== Books ==
- It Comes Up Murder When the Obvious Become a Mystery - Carpenter's - 1967
- Senator Robert Francis Kennedy, the Man, the Mysticism, the Murder - Impact Publishers - 1968
- Bitter Harvest - Orange Tree Press - 1970
- The Child Seducers - Educator Publishers - 1970 ISBN 978-0685415740
- John Schmitz and the American Party - Educator Publications - 1972
- The Conspirators: Men Against God - Orange Tree Press - 1972
- An Inward Stillness and an Inward Healing - Cancer Federation - 1981 ISBN B00071I1R6
- Against all odds: The Cancer Federation's Triumphant History - 1993
- The Seven Deadly Sins and Why We Love Them - Cancer Federation - 1994
- Wayfarers of Fate: A Novel of the Spanish Civil War - Dorrance Publishing Company, Incorporated - 2006 - ISBN 0805970495, 9780805970494
