= Beverly Mae Wilson =

American country singer (1946–2010)

- Born: April 11, 1946; Bridgeport, Connecticut
- Died: July 14, 2010 (aged 89)
- Genre: Country
- Occupation: Singer
- Labels: Impact; Robert Atwood Sherwood Enterprises

Beverly Mae Wilson (April 11, 1946 – July 14, 2010) was an American country singer.

== Early life ==
Wilson was born in Bridgeport, Connecticut, to parents Harry Leslie Wilson and Viola May Wilson (née Maloney). When she was three years old, the Wilson family moved to southern California. At age seven she started playing guitar. Wilson had the nickname of "sweetheart" Of the Marines of Camp Pendleton.

== Career ==
She was managed by her uncle Robert A. Sherwood who composed her material. The arrangements were handled by Gene LaMar.

=== 1950s ===
On February 2, 1957, as one of the entertainment acts, she appeared a dinner event in California with Eddie Snyder, Jackie Golden, Bonnie Gay Smith and some rock'n roll singers. In July 1958 the age of 13, Wilson was undertaking a national tour to promote a single that was to be released in December that year. It was to be released on the Shaston label in December of that year. Before completing the 8,000 mile tour which spanned both coasts, she had stopped in at her hometown Bridgeport and appeared on radio station WNAB, at the Ritz ballroom. By November that year, the teenaged Wilson had appeared on Cliffie Stone's show on KXLA in L.A. the previous month. Then she was set to appear on a new show called Smokey Rogers Western Caravan Show, shown on KFMB-TV in San Diego, California. In May 1959, she performed at the Great Eastern San Diego County Fair and at the Bostonia Ballroom. She performed at venues in Southern California with Smokey Rogers and his Western Caravan. On July 3, 1959 she began a tour of the Pacific Northwest.

=== 1960s ===
Along with Faron Young and Gordon Terry she appeared at the naval station in San Diego. By May, 1960, she had been appearing regularly at Smokey Rogers's Ballroom in El Cajon on Billy Guitar's Sunday sessions. In August, she was in Arizona, Flagstaff's Museum Club on the 26th and 27th. Then it was off to Phoenix for a gig on the 28th. In October 1960, she and Tall Paul Charon were to perform Jamie Horton at San Diego's Tropical Gardens and Recreation Center, having appeared there previously.

In 1961, the January 16 issue of Billboard Music Week reported that she was one of the acts that included the Stratton Brothers and Patsy Montana and the Country Boys who moved into Los Angeles for a series of engagements. Around March, 1961, her management had to cancel several bookings due to a serious illness she was recovering from. By April 10, having recovered from her long illness, she was putting in appearances in L.A. over the Easter weekend. As of October 1961, her backing band was Andy Giordino and the Blue Flames. By December of that year, she already had a record under her belt, had appeared at the Ritz Ballroom and had entered into a contract with the Impact record label.

In April, 1962, Billboard reported that she was to cut a record at Impact Records in California backed by The Shorty Bacon Band Her manager Sherwood had arranged for her to appear on several televised venues in Southern California. However, according to the October 30, 1961 issue of Billboard Music Week, advance copies of the single "Till I Met You" b/w "Lonesome Girl" were available to radio stations by writing on their letterhead to her manager at 1151 Persimmon, El Cajon, California.

In early March, 1963, Billboard announced that she was to be joined by Dale Carter and his Country Swing Band to present live studio shows at Riverside station, KASE Radio on Saturday afternoons.

=== 1970s ===
In 1975, she had a single released. It was "Lonely Fool" b/w "My Secret". Both sides were written by Robert A. Sherwood.

== Later years ==
In later years she was an IRS tax examiner and worked in the capacity until her retirement in 1994. In 2004, she and her husband moved to Harrisonville, Missouri.

=== Death ===
Wilson died on July 14, 2010.

== Discography ==
List of singles
Title	Catalogue	Year	Notes
"Til I Met You" (Beverly Mae Wilson & Mapes Sisters) / "Lonesome Girl" (Beverly Mae Wilson & Blue Flames)	Impact 11-IMX	1963	
"Lonely Fool" / "My Secret"	Robert Atwood Sherwood Enterprises 101	1975	
