= Little Ray =

American musician

- Born: Ramon Jimenez; Delano, California, U.S.
- Genres: Soul, R&B
- Occupation: Singer
- Labels: Doré, Impact, Donna, Warner Bros., Atco, Faro, Columbia

Little Ray, also known as Ray Jimenez, is an American Chicano rock and brown-eyed soul musician, prominent in the 1960s. Jimenez was born and raised in Delano, California, and later moved to East Los Angeles.

Jimenez briefly sang with Thee Midniters, another East Los Angeles band. He then performed with Little Ray & the Progressions, which became the Little Ray Revue.

== Background ==
=== Personal life ===
He was born in Delano, California and grew up in the area. His brothers worked at a fast food stand, and behind the stand was a jukebox. As a boy, he would sing along with it. He would memorize songs heard on the jukebox by artists such as Elvis Presley, Little Richard, and Fats Domino. Later he moved to Los Angeles. He was schooled at Salesian and Garfield High Schools.

=== Music career ===
He started singing professionally in the late 1950s. His first single, "There Is Something On Your Mind," was released on Dore Records in or around 1960. In 1962, with backing band The Premiers, he recorded a live single, "Shake, Shout And Soul," which was recorded at the Santa Monica Civic Auditorium. The single was backed with "Soul & Stomp," and released on Tony Hilder's Impact Records label.

Thee Midnighters

Another single he recorded for Hilder's Impact label was "Loretta," backed with "My Girl." This one was released under the name of Lil' Ray & Thee Midniters. For a brief period of time, he was the lead singer for Thee Midnighters. In 1964, Jimenez left the group, (and was replaced as lead singer by Willie Garcia, a.k.a. "Little Willie G.").

Post 1964

In 1965, he recorded a single for the Donna label. The A side was "I Who Have Nothing," a cover of a Ben E. King song, and the B side, "I Been Trying," was written by Arthur Lee, who went on to form the group Love. Lee was also the producer. "I Who Have Nothing" also appears on the 1997 compilation, Black Beauty & Rarities, which is a compilation of early recordings by Arthur Lee, Ronnie & The Pomona Casuals, and other related artists, (including Little Ray). For a brief period, he and Thee Midnighters singer Willie Garcia formed a group called God's Children. They would record the theme song for the short lived TV series Matt Lincoln, "Hey, Who Really Cares" (aka "Hey, Does Somebody Care"), written by Oliver Nelson and Linda Perhacs.

2000s

In 2012, he was fronting the group Starfire, which included Carlos Santana's son Salvador Santana.

== Discography ==
- "My Rainbow" / "There's Something On Your Mind" - Dore 591 - (1961)
- "Shake, Shout And Soul" / "Soul & Stomp" - Impact 26 IMX - (1962)
- "Loretta" / "My Girl" - Impact 30 IMX - (1962)
- "Come Baby Dance" / "You Can't Hurt Me" - Warner Brothers 5351 - (1963)
- "Karen" / "Come Swim With Me" - Faro 617 - (1964)
- "I Who Have Nothing" / "I Been Trying" - Donna 1404 - (1965)
- "I Who Have Nothing" / "I Been Trying" - Atco 6355 - (1965)
- "It's Good Enough For Me" / ? - ? - (196?)
- "I'll Keep On Loving You" / "Leave her Alone" - Columbia 44287 - (1966 or 1967)
- "Hey, Does Somebody Care" / "Lonely Lullaby" - Uni 55266 (1970)
