= The Pussywillows =

American pop music group

- Origin: New York City, United States
- Genre: Pop
- Years active: 1980s–1990s
- Label: Telstar Records
- Past members: Elinor Blake; Lisa Dembling; Lisa Jenio; Sheryl Farber

The Pussywillows were a group that featured Elinor Blake, Lisa Dembling and Lisa Jenio. Their recordings have appeared on the Kill the Moonlight soundtrack, and the Rutles Highway Revisited album.

== History ==
=== Formation ===
The Pussywillows were originally from New York City. It consisted of three friends—Elinor Blake, Lisa Dembling and Lisa Jenio—who liked singing together girl-group style. With a singing style like that of 1960s groups such as The Shangri-Las and The Ronettes, they would sing on stage wearing thrift-store dresses. The group originally had some help in its formation by Mike Chandler of the group Raunch Hands.

=== Spring Fever! and soundtracks ===
Through Todd Abramson of the Telstar label they got some gigs, which led to them recording Spring Fever!, released on Telstar. The tracks on the album were, "The Boat That I Row", "Come On Now", "Don't Say He's Gone", "Turn Her Down", "Everyone Will Know", "My Baby Looks But He Don't Touch" and "Baby Baby (I Still Love You)". With "The Boat That I Row", the song was written by Neil Diamond and became a hit for Lulu. Another song they covered was "Turn Her Down". It was recorded by girl group The Cupons in the 1960s and released on the Impact label.

The group also did some recordings with Raunch Hands. A big fan of the group was Ronnie Spector who would one day have them backing her on a set of recordings.

In December 1990, they played at the Funhouse in Bethlehem covering songs like Neil Diamond's "The Boat That I Row" and "My Baby Looks But He Don't Touch". In January 1991 with their backing band, which included guitarist Ward Dotson on guitar, Will Rigby on drums and Spike Priggen on bass, they played at the CBGB club in Bleecker Street, Manhattan.

=== Later years ===
Blake moved to LA and by 1991 was using the name April March. Lisa Jenio became a member of and bass player for Candypants and The Liquor Giants.

The Pussywillows contributed background vocals to Ronnie Spector's 2003 album Something's Gonna Happen. They sang on "Communication", "For His Love", "Something's Gonna Happen" and "Whenever You're On My Mind" which were all Marshall Crenshaw compositions.

== Discography ==
Album
Title	Release info	Year	Ref.
Spring Fever!	Telstar Records TR003	1988	

Guest
Artist	Release Title	Release info	Year	Notes	Ref.
Ronnie Spector	Something's Gonna Happen	Bad Girl Sounds 10	2003	CD	

Various artists compilation appearances
Title	Release info	Year	Song title	Notes	Ref.
Every Band Has a Shonen Knife Who Loves Them	Gasatanka Records / Positive Music 6036	1990	"Twist Barbie"		
Rutles Highway Revisited (A Tribute To The Rutles)	Shimmy Disc shimmy-041	1990	"Hold My Hand"		
Attack Of The Terrible Boots	Mint Sound MSRCD4	1997	"Turn Her Down"		
Kill the Moonlight	Sympathy For The Record Industry 482	1997	"Vindaloo"	CD	
