= Jesse Belvin =

American singer, pianist and songwriter (1932–1960)

- Compilation CD cover

Background information
- Born: Jesse Lorenzo Belvin; December 15, 1932; San Antonio, Texas, U.S.
- Died: February 6, 1960 (aged 27) Hope, Arkansas, U.S.
- Genres: R&B, doo-wop
- Occupations: Singer, songwriter
- Instruments: Vocals, piano
- Years active: 1950–60
- Labels: Modern Records; Dot; Impact; RCA; Recorded In Hollywood; Tender Records
- Spouse: JoAnn Belvin (m. 1953; their deaths 1960)

Jesse Lorenzo Belvin (December 15, 1932 – February 6, 1960) was an American singer, pianist and songwriter popular in the 1950s. Belvin co-wrote the 1954 Penguins' doo-wop classic "Earth Angel", which sold more than 10 million copies, while his top recording was the 1956 single "Goodnight My Love", a song that reached No. 7 on Billboard's R&B chart.

Belvin's success was cut short by his death in a car crash at the age of 27. The accident, which also claimed the lives of his wife Jo Ann and their driver, occurred after a concert in Little Rock, Arkansas, that had been disrupted at least twice by white supremacists. It was the first concert ever played before an integrated audience in Little Rock's history. According to an Arkansas state trooper at the scene of the accident, the tires of Belvin's 1959 Cadillac had "obviously been tampered with".

After his death, legendary blues singer Etta James referred to Belvin as the "most gifted of us all. Even now I consider him the greatest singer of my generation. Rhythm and Blues, Rock and Roll, crooner, you name it, he was going to be bigger than Sam Cooke, bigger than Nat Cole."

== Background ==
Belvin was born in San Antonio, Texas, and moved with his family to Los Angeles, California, at the age of five.

On July 10, 1949, Belvin did the opening act with Big Jay McNeely and Lionel Hampton at the 5th Cavalcade of Jazz that was produced by Leon Hefflin, Sr. in Los Angeles at the Wrigley Field ballpark. In 1950, he joined Three Dots and a Dash, saxophonist Big Jay McNeely's backing vocal quartet, and featured prominently on their record releases. In 1952, he joined Specialty Records. Although his early solo records were unsuccessful, his fourth record, "Dream Girl", credited to Jesse & Marvin and featuring sax player Marvin Phillips singing, reached No. 2 on the U.S. Billboard R&B chart in 1953.

Along with Charles Wright, Belvin was involved with Kent-Modern A&R man Tony Hilder in the late 1950s.

== Career ==
Having been drafted into the army around 1953, Belvin continued to write songs. His composition "Earth Angel", eventually co-credited to Belvin and Hollywood Flames singers Curtis Williams and Gaynel Hodge after a legal dispute, was recorded by The Penguins, and became one of the first R&B singles to cross over onto the pop charts, selling 1 million copies in 1954/1955.

In 1956, he signed a contract with Modern Records, but continued to sing for other labels under different names. His biggest hit was "Goodnight My Love", which reached No. 7 on the R&B chart. Some sources report that the piano on the session reportedly was played by 11-year-old Barry White. However, in an interview in 1995 White denied this. The song became the closing theme to Alan Freed's rock and roll radio shows.

Belvin's other recordings for Modern were less successful, and in 1958, he recorded on Dot Records with a group, the Shields, who included lead singer Frankie Ervin and guitarist Johnny "Guitar" Watson. Their record "You Cheated" reached No. 15 on the U.S. pop chart and No. 11 on the R&B chart.

In 1956, the single "The Girl in My Dreams" b/w "I Wanna Know Why", recorded with Eugene Church as The Cliques, peaked at No. 45 on the Billboard Hot 100. "The Girl in My Dreams" was covered by the Four Lovers (two of whose members, including Frankie Valli, would later become The Four Seasons).

By early 1959, Tender Records had a 45 released that was credited to Belvin and The Capris. The single "Beware" was composed by J. Dolphin and backed with "Endless Love", a composition by K. C. Reeth and Robert Hafner.

Inspired by his wife and manager Jo Ann to develop his style, Belvin signed to RCA Records in 1959, and immediately had a top 40 hit with "Guess Who", written by his wife. This song originally started as a love letter from her to him, and Belvin turned it into the hit song it became. He also recorded the album Just Jesse Belvin, developing a mature and sophisticated sound on ballads. His style was influenced by Nat "King" Cole and Billy Eckstine, and became a model for Sam Cooke and others. He acquired the nickname "Mr. Easy", and the record company began molding him as a potential crossover star for white audiences, as well as a professional rival to Capitol Records' recording star Nat "King" Cole.

Belvin recorded a further series of tracks later in the year, with arranger Marty Paich and an orchestra including saxophonist Art Pepper. The songs included soulful covers of standards such as "Blues in the Night", "In the Still of the Night", and "Makin' Whoopee", and were issued on the album Mr. Easy.

== Death under suspicious circumstances ==
Before the album was issued, Belvin appeared on a concert bill with Jackie Wilson and Marv Johnson in Little Rock, Arkansas on February 6, 1960. It was the first concert ever played before an integrated audience in Little Rock's history. The show was stopped twice by interruptions from white people in the audience shouting racial epithets and urging the white teenagers in attendance to leave.

After the performance, Belvin and his wife Jo Ann were killed in a head-on collision near Hope, Arkansas. Police suspected Belvin's car was tampered with. Jackie Wilson told the press that he had requested his lawyer look into the matter, but no official determination was ever made.

Belvin was declared dead at the scene as was their driver. His wife died later in the hospital. He was 27; Jo Ann, 25. The Belvins were buried in Evergreen Cemetery in Boyle Heights, Los Angeles.

Crown Records released The Unforgettable Jesse Belvin in 1961. The next year, 1962, Belvin's single "Tonight My Love", backed with "Looking for Love", was released on Tony Hilder's Impact label.

== See also ==
- "Earth Angel" legal issues
- The 27 Club
