= Norio Hayakawa =

American UFO researcher

Norio Fernando Hayakawa
- Born: October 27, 1944 (age 80); Yokohama, Japan
- Citizenship: United States of America (1976)
- Education: University of New Mexico

Norio Hayakawa (Japanese: 早川 弼生, Hepburn: Hayakawa Norio, born in 1944), is an American activist who lives in Albuquerque, New Mexico. He is currently the director of Civilian Intelligence Central, a citizen oversight committee. He has appeared as a guest on Coast to Coast AM multiple times, and is most known for his UFOlogy investigations in and around New Mexico and the American Southwest.

== Biography ==
Norio Hayakawa is from Yokohama, Japan, but calls New Mexico his home. He attended Spanish classes at the University of New Mexico, and graduated in 1970. During March 1990, Norio Hayakawa led a Nippon TV crew in Dulce, New Mexico, where they interviewed the locals, including from the Jicarilla Apache, tribal officials, general townsfolk, and ranchers, about paranormal activity in the area.

In the past, he has been associated with film maker and activist, Anthony J. Hilder. Hayakawa and Hilder are responsible for starting the Area 51 People's Rally. The event was formed in protest against what was seen as the secrecy surrounding Area 51. In 1999 the rally kicked off on the 5th of June at the Little A'Le'Inn in Rachel, Nevada. The event began with a press conference. There were various topics discussed which included the New World and Global Government. Speakers at the event included Hilder, Ted Gunderson and Spanish speaking talk show host Victor Camacho who came with a truck load of Latino listeners. The following day a gathering of about 200 people were congregating by the signs of Groom Lake Road. Demands were being made by Hilder and some others directed at the Area 51 authorities. Hayakawa opened the 2000 Rally. The event was covered by KVBC and Channel 3 (NBC) with Hilder speaking to the gathering, with Joerg Arnu fielding the reporter's questions.

Norio is also a pianist, he currently records playing on YouTube channel.

== Bibliography ==
- Hayakawa, Norio F. (January 1, 1993). UFOs, the Grand Deception and the Coming New World Order.
- Sanchez, Anthony F. (October 1, 2011). UFO HIGHWAY: The Dulce Interview, Human Origins, HAARP & Project Blue Beam, Foreword by Norio F. Hayakawa.

== Filmography ==
- Encounters with the Unexplained, Season 1, Episode 7. (2000)
- Sins and Secrets, Season 1, Episode 5. (2010)
- Anthony Bourdain: Parts Unknown, Season 2, Episode 4, "New Mexico". (2013)
- Area 51 (as himself)
