= The Exiles (1961 film) =

1961 film by Kent Mackenzie

- 2008 restoration poster
- Directed by: Kent Mackenzie
- Written by: Kent Mackenzie
- Produced by: Kent Mackenzie
- Starring: Yvonne Williams; Homer Nish; Tommy Reynolds; Rico Rodriguez; Clifford Ray Sam; Clydean Parker; Mary Donahue
- Cinematography: Erik Daarstad; Robert Kaufman; John Morrill
- Edited by: Kent Mackenzie; Warren Brown; Thomas Conrad; Erik Daarstad; Thomas Miller; Beth Pattrick
- Music by: Anthony Hilder; The Revels; Robert Hafner; Eddie Sunrise
- Distributed by: Contemporary Films
- Release date: 1961
- Running time: 72 minutes
- Country: United States
- Language: English

The Exiles is a 1961 film by Kent MacKenzie chronicling a day in the life of a group of 20-something Native Americans who left reservation life in the 1950s to live in the district of Bunker Hill, Los Angeles, California. Bunker Hill was then a blighted residential locality of decayed Victorian mansions, sometimes featured in the writings of Raymond Chandler, John Fante, and Charles Bukowski. The structure of the film is that of a narrative feature, the script pieced together from interviews with the documentary subjects. The film features Yvonne Williams, Homer Nish, and Tommy Reynolds.

== Plot ==
The film is about Native Americans who have left their reservations in the Southwest. It follows them in Bunker Hill, a gritty neighborhood in Los Angeles. The cast of American Indian actors are notable for their lack of self-consciousness as they drink and socialize during a night out on the town ending in a 49 party of drumming and dancing on "Hill X" overlooking downtown LA.

== Cast ==
- Yvonne Williams
- Homer Nish
- Tommy Reynolds
- Rico Rodrigues
- Clifford Ray Sam
- Clydean Parker
- Mary Donahue
- Eddie Sunrise as singer on Hill X
- Jacinto Valenzuela
- Ann Amiador as waitress at The Ritz
- Delos Yellow Eagle
- Louis Irwin
- Norman St. Pierre
- Marilyn Lewis as Yvonne's friend
- Bob Lemoyne
- Ernest Marden
- Frankie Red Elk
- Chris Surefoot
- Sedrick Second
- Leonard Postock
- Eugene Pablo
- Matthew Pablo
- Sarah Mazy
- Gloria Muti
- Arthur Madrull as man being shaved
- Ted Guardipee
- Ned Casey
- Jay Robidaux
- I. J. Walker
- Julia Escalanti as Rico's wife
- Danny Escalanti as boy with skypiece
- Della Escalanti
- Tony Fierro

== Production ==
Filming was started in the late 1950s. The film features rock and roll music provided by Anthony Hilder and Robert Hafner. It was performed by The Revels, who recorded on Hilder's Impact record label. Years later Norman Knowles of The Revels recalled some of the tracks they recorded for the film. They included "It's Party Time" and possibly "Revellion". According to Knowles, the song "Commanche," which was written for the movie, was cut.

== Release ==
The Exiles premiered at the 1961 Venice Film Festival. As it was only licensed (16mm version) to schools and churches, it did not find a distributor to release it theatrically in that year, and so over the years it fell into obscurity, known to cinephiles but remaining largely unseen by the public. A restored version produced by the UCLA Film and Television Archive premiered at the Berlin Film Festival in February 2008, and Milestone Films released it commercially and on DVD in summer 2008.

== Legacy ==
In 2009, it was selected for preservation in the National Film Registry by the Library of Congress for being "culturally, historically or aesthetically significant".

Years later, Variety film critic Dennis Harvey's review of the 2015 film Mekko, about a Native American, mentioned The Exiles and On the Bowery (1956); he referred to the two older films as being classics also set on skid row.

== Production crew ==
- Written, produced, and directed by Kent MacKenzie
- Cinematography by Erik Daarstad, Robert Kaufman, John Morrill
- Production by Ronald Austin, Sam Farnsworth, John Morrill, Erik Daarstad, Robert Kaufman, Beth Pattrick, Sven Walnum, Paula Powers
- Additional photography by Sven Walnum, Nicholas Clapp, Vilis Lapenieks.
- Archive photographs by Edward S. Curtis
- Editing by Kent Mackenzie, Warren Brown, Thomas Conrad, Erik Daastad, Thomas Miller, Beth Patrick
- Music by Anthony Hilder, The Revels, Robert Hafner, Eddie Sunrise
- Sound by Sam Farnsworth
- Sound effects edited by Thomas Conrad

== Additional crew ==
- Marvin Walowitz
- Lawrence Silberman
- Stuart Hanisch
- Mindaugus Bagdon
- Charles Smit
- Judy Bradford
- Ken Nelson
- Ron Honthaner
- David MacDougall
- James Christensen
- Stanley Follis
- Ramon Ponce

== See also ==
- List of American films of 1961
