= Rue Barclay =

American musician

- Born: February 23, 1922
- Died: March 6, 1998 (aged 76)
- Occupations: Musician, producer

Rue Barclay (February 23, 1922 – March 6, 1998) was an American Country & Western musician who recorded in the 1940s and in to the 1970s. He was also record producer who produced records for Clarence Jackson, Mutt Poston & The Farm Hands and Red White & The Country Gospel Singers etc.

== Career ==
Barclay had history in recording went back to the late 1940s.

=== 1950s to 1960s ===
In 1950 he had a 78 rpm single "Arizona" bw "Goin' On Down To See Rose" out on the Webster label. It was credited to Rue Barclay And Lois Reed With The Melody Riders. In 1962, Barclay had a release on the Impact label. His release was "I've Lost The Road" bw "Please Dear Won't You Stay". Also that year, a song he co-wrote with Dorinda Morgan for surf band The Tornadoes, "Phantom Surfer " was released on the Aertaun label. The following year Barclay appeared in a low budget film, The Skydivers. He was part of an outfit led by Jimmy Bryant called Jimmy Bryant and the Night Jumpers. Two songs by the group, "Stratosphere Boogie" and "Ah-So" were featured in the film. It was reported in the November 30, 1968, edition of Record World that Barclay was to produce all of the sessions for (husband and wife duo), John & Sharon Leighton who were signed to Sage and Sand Records. Also, in the late 1960s, he was working in promotion for the Reena record label in California.

=== 1970s ===
By 1973, Barclay was running the booking agency for Adkorp. He produced a single for Bob Correll "Piano Man" bw "Don't Knock It "Until You Try It", released on Vistone 2069. Also for the same label, he produced a single for Frank Fara, "Lost Between Yesterday And Today" bw "Donner Pass", released on the Vistone 2074 in 1975.

== Discography ==
Singles
Act	Title	Release info	Year	Notes
Rue Barclay And Peggy Duncan	"River Of Tears" / "Tongue Tied Boy"	Webster 506	1950	
Rue Barclay And Lois Reed With The Melody Riders	"Arizona" / "Goin' On Down To See Rose"	Webster WE 515	1950	(78 rpm)
Rue Barclay And Peggy Duncan	"River Of Tears" / "Tongue Tied Boy"	London HL 8033	1954	(UK release)
Rue Barclay	"Tear Down These Walls" / "Road To Nowhere"	Far-Go 102	1958	
Rue Barclay	"Don’t Come Crying / You Walked Out Of My Life"	Far-Go 106	1958	
Rue Barclay	"I've Lost The Road" / "Please Dear Won't You Stay"	Impact 19	1962	
Rue Barclay	"Nothin Hot in the Pot" / "Teardrops Blues (Walkin Shoes)"	Hi-G Lo-C 3106/7	1964	
Rue Rarclay	"The 18 Minute Gap" / "The Ice Cream Man"	Vistone Records 2070	1974	

Albums
Title	Release info	Year	F	Notes
The Nashville Scene Working Man Blues And Other Country And Western Favorites	Crown CST 596	1969	LP	
Hymn Time with Rue Barclay	Rural Rhythm RR-Rue-145		LP	Rue Barclay, Bill Sampson, guitarist, Curly Harris
Rural Rhythm Presents Rue Barcley The Wanderer With Johnny Davis	Rural Rhythm R.R.R.B. 192		LP	
Country & Folk Gospel Songs	Christian Faith Recordings 1583		LP	
