= Brown-eyed soul =

Soul music genre

Brown-eyed soul, also referred to as Chicano soul, Hispanic soul, or Latino soul, is soul music & rhythm & blues (R&B) performed in the United States mainly by Hispanic Latinos and Chicanos in Southern California, East Los Angeles, and San Antonio (Texas) during the 1960s, continuing through to the early 1980s. The trend of Latinos started with Latino rock and roll and rock musicians. "Brown-eyed soul" contrasts with blue-eyed soul, soul music performed by non-Hispanic white artists.

== History ==
Critic Ruben Molina said roots of chicano soul music were from the 1950s jazz, blues, doo wop, jump blues, latin jazz, rock, ranchera, norteno, and conjunto music in the West Coast, Texas Latino communities. Latino artists drew inspiration from African American R&B hits, and as a result, Latino soul came out of African American soul music. Early artists owed little to traditional Latino and rarely performed in Spanish.

Hispanic rock and roll singer Ritchie Valens, also became one of the first artists to bridge traditional music and rock and roll. Valens recorded "Donna", " La Bamba", "Come On, Let's Go", and "Donna" reached #2 on Billboard pop chart in 1959.

1960s and 1970s bands such as Cannibal & the Headhunters ("Land of a Thousand Dances") and Thee Midniters played R&B music with a rebellious rock and roll edge. Sunny and the Sunliners were also popular in the 1960s.

However, the large Latino population on the West Coast began gradually moving away from energetic R&B to romantic soul, and the results were "some of the sweetest soul music heard during the late '60s and '70s." Latino groups on the West Coast and Texas also drew from the doo wop-influenced Philadelphia soul ("Philly" soul). The West Coast Latin rock scene continued to influence other Latino soul musicians as well.

== Brown-eyed soul artists ==
- Cannibal & the Headhunters
- Frankie J
- Baby Bash
- Paula DeAnda
- Kali Uchis
- Jennifer Lopez
- Malo
- Thee Midniters
- Miguel
- Leslie Grace
- Enrique Iglesias
- Christina Aguilera
- The Premiers
- Sam the Sham & the Pharaohs
- Sheila E
- Sunny & the Sunliners
- Tierra
- War

== See also ==
- West Side Sound
- Latin rock
- Tejano music
- Carlos Santana
- Chicano rock
- Chicano rap
- Lowrider
- Yacht soul
