= Äva Records =

- Founded: 1961
- Founder: Fred Astaire, Elmer Bernstein, Jackie Mills, Tommy Wolf
- Defunct: 1965
- Status: Defunct
- Distributor(s): MGM Records
- Genre: Jazz, pop, soundtracks
- Country of origin: U.S.
- Location: Los Angeles, California

Äva Records was a short-lived American record company and label founded in 1961 by Fred Astaire, Elmer Bernstein, Jackie Mills, and Tommy Wolf. The original name was Choreo Records, but it was changed in 1962 to Äva Records, after Astaire's daughter, to avoid a conflict with Choreo Records in Dallas, Texas. Astaire was president, Mills vice-president.

Mills was the producer for jazz albums that included Victor Feldman, Muggsy Spanier, and Ben Tucker.

In June 1964, Astaire sold his 62% stock interests. Hermes Pan, a shareholder, sold his stock to Glen Costin, a realtor in Texas, and Costin became the label's president.

From September 1961 to August 1964, the labels were distributed by MGM Records. Äva folded in March 1965, with Astaire owning the masters. Mills was president when it folded. The label's catalogue included Elmer Bernstein, Herbie Steward, Pete Jolly, John Neel, and The Charades.

According to Billboard, Costin sold Äva to Charles Jourdan, acting as a representative of a European syndicate.
