= The Premiers =

American band

The Premiers were an American garage band in the 1960s, best known for their 1964 hit, "Farmer John".

== Career ==
The band was formed in 1962 in San Gabriel, California, by Mexican-American brothers Lawrence Perez (guitar) and John Perez (drums), and neighbors George Delgado (guitar) and Frank Zuniga, (bass). They practiced in the Perez brothers' backyard, encouraged by their mother, and soon started drawing crowds to their rehearsals. They were discovered by Billy Cardenas, who managed and produced other Chicano bands in the East Los Angeles area, and won the group slots supporting artists such as Johnny "Guitar" Watson and Chris Montez.

Following The Kingsmen’s success with "Louie Louie", Cardenas suggested that the Premiers record a similar song, "Farmer John", which had been written and recorded by Don and Dewey. Although claimed to have been recorded "live at the Rhythm Room in Fullerton, California", it was actually recorded in a small studio in Hollywood, with overdubbed party noises provided by girls of the Chevelles car club, who had been invited to the studio. The vocals were performed by John Perez and George Delgado singing in unison.

Released on co-producer Eddie Davis’ Faro record label, and later licensed by Warner Bros. Records, the single rose to No. 19 on the U.S. Billboard Hot 100 chart in the summer of 1964. The group was then rushed into recording an album, Farmer John Live, which consisted mainly of R&B standards, again with overdubbed party noises. They also toured nationally with artists such as The Crystals and Gene Pitney, and opened for such groups as The Rolling Stones, The Kinks, and The Dave Clark Five.

The group recorded several more singles up to 1967, some co-produced by Larry Tamblyn of The Standells, but none were commercially successful. First Zuniga, and then Lawrence Perez, were drafted, and the band split up by the end of the decade.

The Premiers' "Farmer John" was featured on the compilation album, Nuggets: Original Artyfacts from the First Psychedelic Era, 1965–1968, issued in 1972; according to the album's original liner notes, it was the only song from 1964 to be included on the album.

In 2001, The Premiers reformed with the Perez brothers and George Delgado from the original line-up, to play occasional concerts and record.

Bassist Frank Zuniga died December 22, 2010, from complications of COPD.

Drummer John Perez died in September 2022.

== Discography ==
=== Faro singles ===
- "Farmer John" / "Duffy's Blues" - Faro 615 - (1964)
- "Get Your Baby" / "Little Ways" - Faro 621 - (1966)
- "Get on This Plane" / "Come On And Dream" - Faro 624 - (1966)
- "Ring Around My Rosie (Part 1)" / "Ring Around My Rosie (Part 2)" - Faro 627 - (1967)

=== Other labels - singles ===
Lil' Ray & The Premiers

- "Shake! Shout! & Soul!" / "Soul & Stomp" - Impact 26-IMX - (1963)

Patrolman Vic Virzera with The Premiers

- "He's on Your Side" / "Two Hearts" - Kef Records 4448 - (1971)

The Premiers

- "Farmer John" / "Duffy's Blues" - Warner Bros. 5443 - (1964)
- "Blues for Arlene" / "Annie Oakley" - Warner Bros. 5464 - (1964)
- The Premiers - "Farmer John" / The Blendells - "La, La, La, La, La, La" - Era Records 24 - (1969)
- "Take My Hand" / "Just a Penalty" - Avco AV-4588 - (1972)

Re-releases

- "Farmer John" / "Duffy's Blues" - Good Old Gold 085
- "Farmer John" / "Duffy's Blues" - Hi-Oldies 430
- The Premiers - "Farmer John" / The Blendells - "La, La, La, La, La, La" - Collectables C 3117

=== Extended play ===
- Farmer John - Warner Bros. Records EP 73 - (1965)

=== Albums ===
- Farmer John Live - Warner Bros. Records 1565 - (1964)
