= West Side Sound =

Texan musical scene and genre

- Stylistic origins: Blues; Rhythm and blues; Rock and roll; Country; Conjunto music; Polka; Swamp pop
- Cultural origins: 1940s–1950s, San Antonio and south-central Texas

Other topics
- Brown-eyed soul

The West Side Sound (or Westside Sound) is a musical scene and regional subgenre of Chicano soul that emerged in San Antonio, Texas, United States, and South-Central Texas more broadly, in the 1940s and 1950s. The name West Side Sound comes from the West Side neighbourhood of San Antonio, though the genre did not originate there. It is also not a singular, easily defined sound.

The West Side Sound helped lay the foundations for the broader Chicano soul (or brown-eyed soul) genre, drawing on disparate styles such as blues, rhythm and blues, rock and roll, country, and the music of Mexican conjunto ensembles, among others.
