= Black Lolita =

1975 film

- Directed by: Stephen Gibson
- Written by: Mike Brown; Stephen Gibson
- Produced by: Stephen Gibson (Producer); Parker Johnson (Executive producer)
- Starring: Yolanda Love; Ed Cheatwood; Susan Ayers; Joey Ginza
- Cinematography: Stephen Gibson
- Music by: Steve Dexter
- Distributed by: Cinema Epoch, Parliament, Pathfinder Pictures, Phaedra Cinema
- Release date: February 12, 1975 (Washington DC)
- Running time: 85 mins
- Country: United States
- Language: English

Black Lolita is a 3D blaxploitation film directed by Stephen Gibson. It was released in 1975 under that title. Some time later, new footage was added to create another film, which was released under the title of Wildcat Women. It is about a singer who returns to her home town to fight the gangsters who have taken it over. It stars Yolanda Love, Ed Cheatwood, Susan Ayers and Joey Ginza.

== Premise ==
A beautiful singer whose career is on the rise finds out that her relatives are being harassed by criminals. She returns to her hometown to take revenge on them. She puts together a team to take them on, and Buddha, the criminal boss who murdered her uncle, from whom he was trying to extort money.

== Background ==
The film is also called Bad Lolita, and was released in 1975. The original was released in 3D. It was announced in the January 20, 1975 issue of Box that the film was possibly the first black action movie to be filmed in 3D and that it was scheduled to open in Chicago in the near future.

At the time when the film was made, Blaxploitation films were still very popular. Producer / director Stephen Gibson thought that some other films of that genre, like the Rudy Ray Moore films, weren't that good, and he thought he could work in that area as long as he delivered. He didn't do enough market research, and the film sank. The film played at Detroit's Grand Circus theater where popcorn was thrown at the screen and seats were damaged. Because he owned the picture, Gibson only had to worry about getting back his own money. He decided to change the title and shoot extra footage and other footage to add the story. The finished product was a different film altogether. It was called Wildcat Women. Black Lolita and Wildcat Women are actually two different films.

=== Music ===
The music for the film was composed by Joe Greene, Marva Farmer and Steve Dexter. Additional music was provided by The Charades. The two songs they contributed were the title song and the love theme

== Screenings ==
The film was screened at the Plaza in Detroit in June 1975, and was doubled with Quadroon, which explored the status of mixed-race women in early 1800s New Orleans. Also in Detroit, it screened at the Grand Circus where it didn't do well.

== Cast and crew ==
=== Cast ===
- Lolita ... Yolanda Love
- Ed Cheatwood ... Cleon
- Joey Ginza ... Buddha
- Susan Ayres ... Robbie
- Judy Williams ... Shirley
- Zenobia Wittacre ... Pearl
- Larry Ellis ... Tinker

=== Crew ===
- Richard Albain Sr ... Special effects
- Mike Brown ... Story and screenplay
- Steve Dexter ... Music
- Thomas L. Fisher ... Special effects
- Stephen Gibson ... Director, producer, story and screenplay
- Arnold Herr ... Camera assistant
- Parker Johnson ... Executive producer
- Jef Richard ... Production manager
- Bruce Scott ... Sound
