= Kent Mackenzie =

American film director

- Born: Kent Robert Mackenzie; 6 April 1930; Hampstead, England
- Died: 16 May 1980 (aged 50); Marin County, California, U.S.
- Occupations: Director, producer, writer, cinematographer, editor
- Years active: 1956–1978

Kent Robert Mackenzie (6 April 1930 – 16 May 1980) was an English-American film director and producer mainly remembered for his film, The Exiles, which was about Native American young people in Los Angeles. He was also involved with Churchill Films in making educational films, such as Can a Parent Be Human?

== Biography ==
Mackenzie was born on April 6, 1930, in Hampstead, England. His mother was English, and his father was Dewitt Mackenzie, who was head of the London Bureau of the Associated Press. After finishing school, Kent Mackenzie enlisted in the air force and later ended up in Hollywood, where, after gaining a scholarship, he made Bunker Hill, his first film. His next film, The Exiles, was released in 1961.

In later years, he worked as an editor on television documentaries and medical and industrial films and shorts, and directing a film for the US Information Agency on US governmental vocational training. During the 1960s and 1970s, he taught film-making to high school classes. He also directed some films for Churchill Films.

Since the mid-1970s, he has suffered from seizures. He died on 16 May 1980 in Marin County, California, as a result of his medication and related complications.

== Films ==
=== The Exiles ===
The setting for The Exiles was in Bunker Hill. This was the second time Mackenzie had used the Hill in a film. The first instance was in 1956 when he made a film about the displacement of pensioners being moved because of high-rise buildings being built in their area. The Exiles was an independent film and took three-and-a-half years to make, and had its share of issues. During the film, some of the cast were imprisoned and therefore never appeared in later scenes. He also lost two of his cameramen. The film is about Native Americans who move from the reservation to the city and some of the issues they encounter. Christina Rose of the Indian Country Today Media Network wrote that it was the first film to give an accurate portrayal of urban natives.

=== Other films ===
Before making The Exiles, Mackenzie made Bunker Hill in 1956. He was still a student at USC at the time. The film centered on elderly pensioners and their community and the displacement they experienced because of a block of high-rise offices that was to be built there.

In 1965, he produced and directed The Teenage Revolution, which featured Barry Brown in an early role and was narrated by Van Heflin. It looked at six teenagers and their society and culture as well as their current lives while speculating about their futures.

He directed and produced Saturday Morning, a film about teenagers, released in 1971 through Dimension Films, of which Gary Goldsmith was chief and producer. It was a non-fiction film that involved a group of 20 teenagers being filmed over a period of a week.

== Filmography ==
- Bunker Hill, 1956, director
- The Exiles, 1961, writer, producer, director, editor
- Story of a Test Pilot, 1962, editor
- Story of a Rodeo Cowboy, 1963, producer, director, writer, editor
- The T.A.M.I. Show, 1964, editor
- A Skill For Molina, 1964, director, producer
- The Way Out Men, 1965, editor
- Prelude to War: Beginning of World War II, cinematographer, editor
- Why Man Creates, editor
- Ivan And His Father, 1970, director
- Saturday Morning, 1971, producer, director, editor
- Sunseed, 1973, editor
- The Searching Years: Can a Parent Be Human?, 1978, director
- The Searching Years: I Owe You Nothing, 1978, director
- Wait until Your Father Gets Home, 1978, director
- Mom, Why Don't You Listen?, 1978, director
- The Searching Years: Mom, Why Won't You Listen?, 1978, director
