= Bacchus Archives =

- Parent company: Dionysus Records
- Status: Active
- Genre: Various
- Country of origin: United States
- Location: PO Box 1975, Burbank, CA 91507
- Official website: www.dionysusrecords.com/home/category/bacchus-archives

Bacchus Archives is a record label that has often released previous unreleased recordings. Some of the recordings it has released, includes recordings by artists such as The Controllers, Evan "Funk" Davies, The Dils, Peter Miller and Bob Thompson. It is also sublabel of Dionysus Records.

== Background ==
Baccus Archives is located in Burbank, California, United States. Its parent label is Dionysus Records. The parent label was founded by Lee Joseph in 1983.

Some of the music that it has issued / reissued covering the period from the 1950s through to the 1980s and beyond, includes Rockabilly, 60s Garage and Arizona Garage, Psych and Freakbeat. It has also issued / reissued Proto-punk and 70s Punk including L.A. 70s punk. In addition to keeping various back-catalogue recordings in print, it also releases recordings that lean towards certain past genres. Some of the releases have been by artists that include the Creepy Creeps, Ruby Dee and The Snakehanders, The Satelliters and Stereophonic Space Sound Unlimited.

== Releases ==
In the first quarter of 1996, the label issued a 30 track compilation of Chicano rock from 1959 to 1966. The album The East Side Sound featured recordings from Eddie Davis's Faro, and Linda record labels. Also that year, the label reissued Robert Drasnin's 1959 Voodoo album. In 1999, on both LP and CD, the label issued the Tony Hilder produced Al Garcia and the Rhythm Kings's Exotic And Rockin' Instrumentals 1963-1964 album which included two tracks by The Charades. Also that year, featuring some more Hilder produced tracks ended up on Rare L.A. Tracks West Coast Style Vintage R&B And Doo-Wop, 1956-1964 Bacchus Archives BA1134. It featured a couple of tracks by the Charades as well as recordings by Ray Agee, Charles Andrea & The Hi-Tones and Donny Tolliver. Another release in 1999 was Vol. 1 of Fuzz, Flaykes, & Shakes compilation series which featured various Garage and Psychedelic bands. By 2002, Vol. 6 and 7 had been issued.

In 2014, the label released Surf Mania on LP by the Surf Teens. The album, originally released in 1963 on Sutton, had previous been re-released by Bacchus in 1998 on both LP and CD.
