= Ted Gunderson =

FBI agent and private investigator

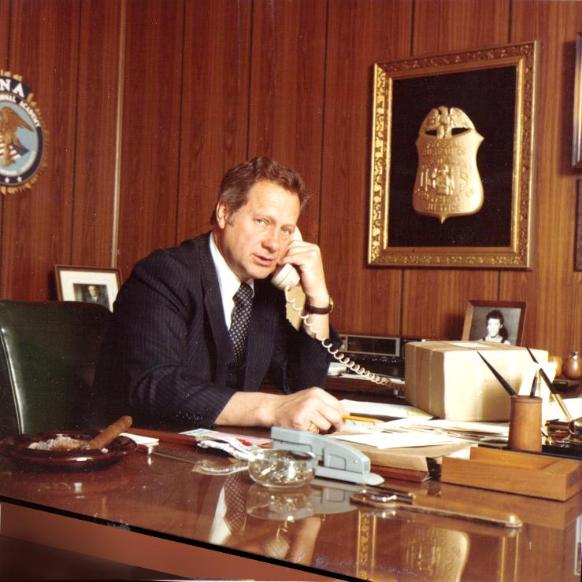
- Gunderson in his FBI office
- Born: November 7, 1928; Colorado Springs, Colorado, U.S.
- Died: July 31, 2011 (aged 82); Memphis, Tennessee, U.S.
- Occupations: FBI Senior Special Agent In Charge, private investigator, speaker, author
- Employer(s): Federal Bureau of Investigation, private clients
- Title: Senior Special Agent in Charge, Los Angeles; Special Agent in Charge, Dallas, Memphis and Washington, D.C. offices, F.B.I.
- Political party: Constitution

Theodore L. Gunderson (November 7, 1928 – July 31, 2011) was an American Federal Bureau of Investigation agent, author, and conspiracy theorist. Some of his FBI case work included the death of Marilyn Monroe and the assassination of John F. Kennedy. He was the author of the best-selling book How to Locate Anyone Anywhere Without Leaving Home. In later life, he researched a number of topics, notably including satanic ritual abuse.

== Early life and FBI ==
Ted Gunderson was born in Colorado Springs. He graduated from the University of Nebraska in 1950.

In December 1951, Gunderson joined the Federal Bureau of Investigation under J. Edgar Hoover. He served in the Mobile, Knoxville, New York City, and Albuquerque offices. He held posts as an Assistant Special Agent in Charge in New Haven and Philadelphia. In 1973, he became the head of the Memphis FBI office, and in 1975 became head of the Dallas FBI office. In 1977, Gunderson was appointed head of the Los Angeles FBI. In 1979, he was one of a handful interviewed for the job of FBI director, which ultimately went to William H. Webster.

== Post-FBI ==
After retiring from the FBI, Gunderson set up a private investigation firm, Ted L. Gunderson and Associates, in Santa Monica. In 1980, he became a defense investigator for Green Beret doctor Jeffrey R. MacDonald, who had been convicted of the 1970 murders of his pregnant wife and two daughters. Gunderson obtained affidavits from Helena Stoeckley confessing to her involvement in the murders which she claimed had in actuality been perpetrated by a Satanic cult of which she was a member.

Stoeckley later took and passed a polygraph, with the military examiner concluding that Stoeckley truthfully believed that she was present at MacDonald's home during the murders. But because of her drug use during and after the murders, the examiner could not conclude if she was actually present at the scene of the murders. Some time afterwards, Stoeckley changed her story and denied ever having seen MacDonald, and was adamant she was not involved. Under oath, Stoeckley denied any culpability in murders, and any knowledge of who may have committed the acts. On her deathbed at the age of 31, Stoeckley changed her story one final time and reiterated and reaffirmed that she was present during the murder of MacDonald's family and that MacDonald himself is innocent.

Gunderson became a leading figure on the far-right and a leading anti-government conspiracy theorist.

Gunderson was involved in the McMartin preschool case, at the heart of the 1980s "satanic panic". He made numerous confident statements supporting the truth of the supposed abuse ring and became a "recognized spokesman on the dangers of satanic ritual cults". In 1986, Gunderson sued the General Telephone Co., alleging that they had allowed his business telephone to be tapped to allow for surveillance.

In a 1995 ritual abuse conference in Dallas, Gunderson warned about the proliferation of purported secret occultist groups, and the danger posed by the New World Order, a conspiracy theory about an alleged shadow government that would be controlling the United States government. He also claimed that four thousand ritual human sacrifices are performed in New York City every year; that the 1995 bombing of the Alfred P. Murrah Federal Building in Oklahoma City was carried out by the U.S. government; and related Paul Bonacci's account of a "slave auction" in Las Vegas in which children were sold to men in turbans.

Gunderson also claimed that in the United States, there is a secret widespread network of groups who kidnap children and infants and subject them to ritual abuse and subsequent human sacrifice.

The Southern Poverty Law Center believed Gunderson "played a pivotal role in the anti-government 'patriot' movement". Gunderson alleged the U.S. government was preparing for mass executions by setting up a thousand internment camps and purchasing 30,000 guillotines. He was also an architect of conspiracy theories around the Oklahoma City bombing, promoting a narrative of an FBI coverup, and the idea that if McVeigh was one of the bombers then it was due to secret government mind control.

Gunderson had an association with former music producer and conspiracy film maker Anthony J. Hilder. Hilder had interviewed him regarding the 1993 World Trade Center bombing. He also appeared in Hilder's Reichstag '95 and Illuminazi 911 documentaries.

Gunderson did not believe that Sonny Bono died in a skiing accident. Instead, Gunderson alleged that top officials linked to an international drug and weapons ring feared the singer-turned-politician was about to expose their crimes, so they had Bono murdered on the ski slopes and staged the accident.

== Death ==
On July 31, 2011 Gunderson's son reported that his father had died from bladder cancer.

== Publications ==
- The Gunderson Report on the Bombing of the Alfred P. Murrah Federal Building, Oklahoma City, Oklahoma. April 19, 1995. Las Vegas: Ted L. Gunderson and Associates (Jan. 11, 1996).
- Foreword to The Mystery of the Carefully Crafted Hoax. Lincoln, Neb.: Nebraska Leadership Conference (1991). pp. iv-vii. OCLC 26868017.
- How to Locate Anyone Anywhere Without Leaving Home, with Roger McGovern. New York: Penguin Books (Jun. 1991). ISBN 978-0525484752.
  - New York: E.P. Dutton (1996).
- Corruption: The Satanic Drug Cult Network and Missing Children, Vol. 4 (1988).
- Corruption: The Satanic Drug Cult Network and Missing Children, Vol. 3 (1988). 622 pp.
- Corruption: The Satanic Drug Cult Network and Missing Children, Vol. 2 (1988).
- Corruption: The Satanic Drug Cult Network and Missing Children, Vol. 1 (1988). 622 pp.
