= Maria Hassabi =

Cypriot artist and choreographer (born 1973)

- Born: 1973 (age 52–53); Nicosia, Cyprus
- Education: California Institute of the Arts (BFA); Merce Cunningham Studios
- Occupations: Performance artist; choreographer
- Awards: Guggenheim Fellowship (2011); Alpert Award in Dance (2015)

Maria Hassabi (born 1973) is an artist and choreographer based in the United States. A 2011 Guggenheim Fellow, she engages in performances she calls "live installations".

== Biography ==
Maria Hassabi was born in 1973 in Nicosia and raised there, as well as in Dubai and Los Angeles, and educated at the California Institute of the Arts, where she got a BFA in performance and choreography (1994), and at Merce Cunningham Studios in New York City. In 1994, she starred in Steve Hanft's film Kill the Moonlight as Sandra.

After starting with dance performances throughout the city such as Dead Is Dead (2004) and Still Smoking (2006), she started moving beyond theatres, later calling them "live installations"; In her book The Persistence of Dance, Erin Brannigan said that term "makes a clear statement about the intermedial position she takes through adopting visual art language that stresses the situated, durational aspect of her works". She was awarded a Foundation for Contemporary Arts Grant to Artists in 2009. She was awarded a Guggenheim Fellowship in 2011. Her 2013 work Intermission was part of the 55th Venice Biennale's joint Cypriot-Lithuanian pavilion.

She won the 2015 Alpert Award in Dance. In 2016, she held an exhibition at MoMA called Plastic, in which dancers would slowly move throughout the museum's stairs and floors; it was featured in Artnet's March 10, 2016, edition of The Daily Pic, with Blake Gopnik saying that "the performers’ slo-mo “interface” has to be read as a comment on how sped-up the action of average visitors has become, at MoMA and most other museums." From October to November 2023, she held her first solo exhibition in Asia, I’ll Be Your Mirror at Tai Kwun Contemporary.
