= Robert Hafner =

American record producer and songwriter

- Born: Robert John Hafner; April 8, 1932; Coatesville, Pennsylvania, United States
- Died: October 12, 2013 (aged 81)
- Occupations: Musician, composer, record producer
- Years active: 1950s to 1980s
- Spouse: Barbara Hafner

Robert Hafner (April 8, 1932 – October 12, 2013) was an American record producer and songwriter who, along with Tony Hilder, was responsible for many of the surf records that came out in California in the 1960s including "Vesuvius" and "Intoxica" by The Revels. He also contributed to the music for the film The Exiles. Music historian and author Robert Dalley said that he had a definite place in surf history.

== Personal life ==
Hafner was born in Coatesville, Pennsylvania in 1932. In 1939 the Hafner family moved to Los Angeles. While at high school he got his first guitar and later joined the high school jazz swing band. After quitting college and moving to New York he attempted to get into the Actors Studio, but ended up working as a painter. Following the deaths of his parents within a short time of each other, he ended up broke and on skid row. He then caught up with an old acquaintance and with his help he got into the music business, working as a songwriter and musical arranger. In 1969 he married in Idaho. In 1992 he and his wife Barbara moved to Chicago to be closer to her parents. They had a daughter, Celeste.

He died of heart failure Sunday, October 13, 2015, at Centegra Memorial Medical Center in McHenry, aged 81. At the time of his death, he had lived in Lake County for 30 years.

== Music career ==
In the late 1950s Hafner also worked with Los Angeles producer Earl Stone. It was reconnecting with this old acquaintance that he was able to work with The Revels.

In 1961 Hafner and Anthony (Tony) Hilder provided the music for the film The Exiles.

The bands Hafner and Hilder worked with included a group called New Dimension. They never released any singles. The albums were released by a very small record label called Sutton who Hilder and Hafner had a deal with. These budget releases were packaged in generic sleeves and sent straight to shops to go into the cut-out bins and racks.

His composition "Comanche" was used for the film Pulp Fiction, which he found offensive as it was used as background music for a violent scene in the film. According to him, there was an idealistic angle to the song as it was about the plight of the American Indian.

By the late 1990s, he had stopped writing music and had left the music business.

=== Compositions covered ===
"Turn Him Down" aka "Turn Her Down"

Hafner co-wrote the song "Turn Him Down" with K.C. Reeth. It was recorded by Emmett Lord and released as the B side of "Woman" on Liberty 55491 in 1962. It was given a forecast of moderate sales potential by Billboard in its September 8 issue. Also that year it was covered by another group, Rochell & the Candles with the new title, "Turn Her Down" and released as the B side of their Challenge single, "Each Night". A girl group called The Cupons released their version backed with "Be Your Love Tonight" on the Impact label in 1964. Later covers of the song have been by The Pussywillows on their 1988 Spring Fever! album, and Japanese punk / garage girl group, MELLViNS as the B side of their 2015 single, "One Fine Day".

== Film and other ==
In 1959, Hafner and Tony Hilder had small parts in the film The Hideous Sun Demon, a sci-fi horror film directed by Tom Boutross and Robert Clarke. During his life he wrote several screenplays and novels.

== Compositions (selective) ==
Title	Group / Act	Release	Catalogue	Year	Notes #
"Endless Love"	Jesse Belvin and The Capris	"Beware" / "Endless Love"	Tender 518	1959	Co-composed with K.C. Reeth
"Rendezvous"	Billy Watkins	"You're Unforgettable" / "Rendezvous"	Challenge 59056	1959	
"Endless Love"	Vi Hall	"Endless Love" / "It's Graduation Time"	CT C-1 / C-1X		Co-composed with K.C. Reeth
"Vesuvius," "Church Key"	The Revels	"Vesuvius" / "Church Key"	Impact 1-IMX	1960	
"Intoxica," "Comanche"	The Revels	"Intoxica" / "Tequila"	Impact 3-IMX	1961	
"Latin Soul", "Christmas Eve"	The Sentinals	"Latin Soul" / "Christmas Eve"	Era 3097	1962	(Side 2 co-written with K.C. Reeth)
"Surfin' Tragedy"	Bob Vaught and the Renegades	"Exotic" / "Surfin' Tragedy"	GNP Crescendo GNP 193X	1963	
"The Final Season"	Bob Linkletter	"The Out Crowd" / "The Final Season"	Chattahoochee Records CH 702	1965	
"The Day George Wallace Was Shot"	Bob Hafner and the Homesteaders	"The Day George Wallace Was Shot" / "Brave Men Walk Alone"	Liberty Tree	1972	
