= Kill the Moonlight (film) =

- Directed by: Steve Hanft
- Written by: Steve Hanft
- Produced by: Steve Hanft
- Starring: Thomas Hendrix; Ross Harris
- Cinematography: Steve Hanft
- Edited by: Steve Hanft
- Distributed by: Plexifilm
- Release date: 1994
- Running time: 75 minutes
- Country: United States
- Language: English

Kill the Moonlight is a 16mm feature film completed in 1991. It is a hangout comedy about a stock car racer. Two of the film's characters are sampled in Beck's song "Loser". The film was unprinted and seen by very few until 1994 when it premiered at the Rome Film Festival.

== Synopsis ==
A stock car racer blows a rod and his car catches fire. To raise money to get back into the game he works as a fish hatchery worker, toxic waste cleaner, drug peddler and thief.

== Cast ==
- Thomas Hendrix as Chance
- Maria Hassabi as Sandra
- Ross Harris as Ross
- Richmond Arquette as Sandra's boyfriend
- Jaime Colindrez as Jaime
- Beata Henrichs as Cindy
- Ralston Regan as Chance's father
- Eddie Ruscha as Surf bassist

== Soundtrack ==
First issued by Sympathy for the Record Industry in 1997, the out of print soundtrack to Kill The Moonlight was reissued with the Plexifilm DVD release, this time including tracks from Beck and Steve Hanft's band Loser.

- Beck - "Leave Me On The Moon"
- The Pussywillows - "Vindaloo"
- The Dynamics - "Tube Glory"
- The Raunch Hands - "Green Room"
- Pam Aronoff - "TV Jazz"
- Go to Blazes - "Hating You"
- Loser - "Born Of Whiskey"
- Beck - "Last Night I Traded My Soul's Innermost for Some Pickled Fish"
- Delta Garage - "Blue Eyes"
- Thomas Hendrix - "Kill The Moonlight Sample"
- The World Famous Blue Jays - "Cookin' With Jay"
- Go To Blazes - "Bad Cup of Coffee"
- Beck - "Underwater Music"
- Loser - "Dad Came Home"
- Martha Atwell - "Wildwood Flower"
- Thomas Hendrix - "Can't Find My Car"
- Pam Aronoff - "Clear"
- Loser - "Fish Bait"
- The Dynamics - "Spaghetti Ride"
