= Conspiracy Con =

Former conspiracy theory convention in Santa Clara, California

- Genre: Conspiracy/Paranormal
- Location: Santa Clara, California
- Country: United States
- Inaugurated: 2001
- Most recent: 2013
- Organizer: Brian William Hall
- Website: http://conspiracycon.com/

Conspiracy Con (shortened form for Conspiracy Conference) was an annual conspiracy convention begun in 2001 by Brian William Hall and took place in Santa Clara, California, United States. It was held on the weekend preceding Memorial Day until 2007 and has since taken place on the following weekend. The event has not been held since 2013, the 2014 convention being cancelled after its producer was unable to fund it.

The primary goals of Conspiracy Con are to directly expose and analyze the "real" problems and the "real" problem-makers of yesterday, today and tomorrow, as well as to provide courses of action and potential solutions to the challenges that are placed upon humankind by these forces, which (for the moment) may seem invisible, perpetual and insurmountable.

Topics included: secret societies, the New World Order, chemtrails, MKUltra, reptilians, suppressed technology (like free energy suppression), and other paranormal phenomena.

Hall stated that the convention looked "to the manipulation of humanity by non-human intelligences ... be they alien, inter-dimensional, demonic, satanic ... whatever consciousness it is, operating on (and in) this planet, that looks upon humankind as sheep and cattle to be herded and slaughtered at will." "[The convention] is meant to be controversial; it is a serious approach to serious issues that are rarely or never reported by the mainstream media."

The Anti-Defamation League described the 2002 Con as "a conference focusing on various anti-government anti-Semitic, and anti-Christian conspiracy theories."
