= Eddie Davis (producer) =

American singer (1926–1994)

Edward Louis "Eddie" Davis (1926 – 1994) was an American singer, record producer and record label owner who was active in the 1950s and 1960s. He is an important part of the Los Angeles music scene for that period, especially in the history of Mexican-American rock music.

== Background ==
He was born Edward Louis Davis in 1926 in Boyle Heights, California. He was half Jewish but was raised in the Catholic faith. He was also a child actor and appeared in some films with Mickey Rooney and Spencer Tracy, James Cagney and Bing Crosby. They were Boys Town, Angels With Dirty Faces, and Going My Way. After graduation from Fairfax High School, he joined the navy and saw action during the Second World War and he was awarded the Victory Medal. After the war he studied music at the University of the Pacific.

In an interview for Latinopia in 2010, Hector González said that Davis developed cancer in 1991 and deteriorated. He died in October 1994. In his will he left the recordings, labels and memorabilia to Hector González who now owns Rampart Records.

== Career ==
Before Davis tried his hand at being a recording artist he went info the restaurant business. The first restaurant that he opened which was one of seven throughout his life was the Pancake Twins, located at L.A.'s First Street and La Brea Avenue. Later he bought a club located at Cahuenga and Hollywood boulevards. It would later be known as the Continental Crush Bar.

Trying his hand at being a singer, he recorded at duet with Connie Stevens which was "Devil and the Deep Blue Sea". Also during the same session, Davis and Tony Butala recorded a Davis composition, "I Was a Teenage Brain Surgeon for the FBI". The song, he recorded with Stevens didn't go anywhere and possibly lacking confidence in himself as a singer, some time later, he went into record production and founded Faro Records. By March 1958, Davis had nine artists signed up. He also had Wayne Corps as his vice-president and Robert Flugel as national sales & promotion manager. Possibly the first single he recorded for his label was in 1958 with a singer Davis had recently signed up. The artist was Kenny Miller, and under Davis's direction, Miller recorded "You Are Love To Me", a ballad that didn't make any impact.

His Faro Productions was up there with Del-Fi as an outlet for recordings by Latino artists.

In 1961, he founded Rampart Records.

== Artists ==
Around the mid-60's, two young brothers recorded some singles for his label. They were the Salas Brothers who would later go on to form Tierra and also be members of El Chicano.

In the first quarter of 1996, a 30 track compilation of recordings from his Faro, and Linda record labels was released on the Bacchus Archives label. The music was by mainly Chicano artists from the 1959 to 1966 period.

The label issued a 30 track compilation of Chicano rock from . The album The East Side Sound featured recordings from the 1959 to 1966 period.

== Eddie Davis Discography ==
=== Eddie L. Davis ===
- "Heart Of Ice" /"To Be Or Not To Be" - Vita 170 - (1957)
- "Teenage Brain Surgeon" / "Tick Tock Rock" - Fable 637 -(1958)

=== Ed Davis & Connie Stevens ===
- "Between The Devil And The Deep Blue Sea" / "Love Me As Though There Were No Tomorrow" (Ed Davis only) - Faro 596 - (1959)
