= Impact Records (California) =

American record label

- Parent company: Anthony Music
- Founder: Anthony J. Hilder
- Status: defunct
- Genre: Surf music
- Country of origin: United States
- Location: Los Angeles, California

Impact Records was a California based record label run by CT Records creator, Tony Hilder in the 1960s. This label released some surf records by The Crestwoods, Dave Myers and The Surftones, The Ramblers and The New Breed and The Revels. The Revels were known for the hits "Comanche" and "Intoxica".

== Background ==
Formed in the 1960s, this Los Angeles-based record label was managed by Tony Hilder. Among other things, Impact Records served as an outlet for masters that Hilder couldn't get released on other labels. A good deal of the material released was from local aspiring artists and bands of the Los Angeles area. Dean Zook handled the radio promotion for the Midwest, working from his base in Denver.

The first release on the label was "Church Key" by The Revels. The song was the first release for the label and credited to The Revels with Barbara Adkins. The single was distributed nationally by Liberty Records but was issued under the banner of Impact to keep the identity of the label. The Revels, a local Californian band who had been around since 1957 had 4 singles released on the label from 1960 to 1962 which included the single they were best known for "Church Key".

One album that was produced by Hilder and released on the Impact label was called Shake! Shout! & Soul. The recording for the album was done live at Santa Monica's 2nd Annual Surf Fair. It featured Lil Ray, The Original Surfaris, Dave Myers and the Surftones, The New Dimensions, Steve Korey and The Virtue Four.

== Artists ==
=== Shorty Bacon ===
In April, 1962, Billboard reported that the Shorty Bacon band was backing Beverly Mae Wilson on a record she was to cut a record for Impact. Shorty Bacon's own release on the label was in 1961 with "Ten Times The World" / "What's Wrong With You". The B side was co-written by him. Later, he had another single on the label with "Daniel Boone " bw Walls Of Yuma". He had a recording history that went back to the 1950s and prior to his releases on Impact, he had records out on the Kelley, Mohawk and Ozark labels. A few years later he was playing with Rose Maddox. One of his later records "Stand Up Fool" did quite well and gained a degree of popularity in the early 1970s.

=== Rue Barclay ===
In 1962, Rue Barclay had a release with "I've Lost The Road" bw "Please Dear Won't You Stay" on the label. His history in recording went back to the late 1940s. His release was "I've Lost The Road" bw "Please Dear Won't You Stay". The following year Barclay appeared in a low budget film, The Skydivers.

=== The Cupons ===
The Cupons were a group who had their single released on Impact. One of the members was the sister-in-law of Anthony J. Hilder. His wife's sister. Robert Hafner co-wrote the song "Turn Him Down" with K.C. Reeth. It was previously recorded by Emmett Lord, and Rochell & the Candles Girl group, The Cupons released their version backed with "Be Your Love Tonight", credited to Materlyn And The Cupons. "Turn Her Down" would be included on the VA comp, Girls in the Garage, Vol. 6 which was released on vinyl in 2018. The Cupons' version of the song would later inspire a cover by The Pussywillows, included on their 1988 Spring Fever! album A Japanese punk / garage girl group, MELLViNS recorded it for the B side of their 2015 single, "One Fine Day".

=== Little Ray Jimenez ===
Little Ray Jimenez had a single on the label in 1962 with "Shake! Shout! & Soul!" bw "Soul And Stomp!".

=== The Revels ===
San Luis Obispo group, The Revels started out in high school in the mid-1950s as Gil Serna and the Rockets. Their name was changed to The Revels after Norman Knowles took over as the band leader. Two songs that they are most known for are "Church Key" and "Comanche". "Church Key" was a hit for them in 1960. One of their following singles was "Intoxica" backed with "Tequila" which was released in 1961. Their 1961 song "Comanche", a Robert Hafner composition was first released on Impact 7 in 1961. It has been featured in two film soundtracks. It first appeared as the "Detoured Theme" in The Exiles. In later years, it was included along with several other surf music hits on the soundtrack of the 1994 film, Pulp Fiction.

== Info on other releases ==
In 1964, Dr. W.S. McBirnie presented "The Great Debate of 1964" with topics titled The Rumford Act, Convergence, and Coexistence. A 7" 45 RPM single of this speech was released on Impact AU-4X / AU-4.

== Catalogue ==
List of singles
Act	Title	Catalogue	Year	Notes
The Revels	"Church Key" / "Vesuvius"	Impact 1-IM / 1-IMX	1960	
Phil Campos	"Street Fight" / "Rebel Rider"	Impact 2-IM / 2-IMX		
The Revels	"Intoxica" / "Tequila"	Impact 3-IM / 3-IMX	1961	
Sandra Teen	"Angel Baby" / "Stranger In Love"	Impact 4-IM / 4-IMX	1961	
The Spektrums	"The Santa Maria" / "Sundown"	Impact 5-IM / 5-IMX	1961	
The Crestwoods	"Angel Of Love" / "Lucky Star"	Impact 6-IM / 6-IMX	1961	
The Revels	"Rampage" / "Comanche"	Impact 7-IM / 7-IMX	1961	
Bob Kuhn	"Rendezvous" / "A Serenade To Julie"	Impact 8-IM / 8-IMX	1961	
Eddie Snell	"I Feel Like Crying" / "Unless Things Go Your Way"	Impact 9-IM / 9-IMX	1961	
The Ramblers	"Yaba Daba Ah Doo" / "Funny Papers"	Impact 10-IM / 10-IMX	1961	
Beverly Mae Wilson	"Lonesome Girl" / "Till I Met You"	Impact 11-IM / 11-IMX	1961	
Guiseppi Apollo	"Bright Star" / "All Because Of You"	Impact 12-IM / 12-IMX	1961	
The Revels	"It's Party Time" / "Soft Top"	Impact 13-IM / 13-IMX	1963	
The Breakers	"Surfin' Tragedy" / "Surf Bird"	Impact 14-IM / 14-IMX	1961	
Don Mikkelson	"I Can't Get Over The Blues" / "Now You're Gone"	Impact 15-IM / 15-IMX	1961	
Dannie Toliver	"Little Boy Blue" / "Take A Chance"	Impact 16-IM / 16-IMX	1961	
Shorty Bacon	"Ten Times The World" / "What's Wrong With You"	Impact 17-IM / 17-IMX	1961	
The Hollywood Rebels	"Thrillers" / "Rebel Stomp"	Impact 18-IM / 18-IMX	1962	
Rue Barclay	"I've Lost The Road" / "Please Dear Won't You Stay"	Impact 19-IM / 19-IMX	1962	
Dave Myers And The Surftones	"Moment Of Truth" / "Frogwalk"	Impact 20-IM / 20-IMX	1962	
Bonnie Wagner	"No Other Love" / "Luau"	Impact 21-IM / 21-IMX	1962	
The Revels	"Conga Twist" / "Revellion	Impact 22-IM / 22-IMX	1962	
The Revels	"The Monkey Bird" / "Revellion"	Impact 22-IM / 22-IMX	1962	Note "Conga Twist" / "Revellion" & "The Monkey Bird" / "Revellion" share the same cat no.
Jesse Belvin	"Tonight My Love" / "Looking For Love"	Impact 23-IM / 23-IMX	1962	
Bob Vaught and The Renegaids	"Bo-Gator" / "Church Key Twist	Impact 24-IM / 24-IMX	1962	
Evan and The Emperors	"La Freeze" / "Emperor's Twist"	Impact 25-IM / 25-IMX	1962	
Lil' Ray and The Premiers	"Shake, Shout And Soul" / "Soul And Stomp"	Impact 26-IM / 26-IMX	1962	
Dave Myers and The Surftones	"Church Key" / "Passion"	Impact 27-IM / 26-IMX	1962	
Materlyn and The Cupons	"I'll Be Your Love Tonight" / "Turn Her Down"	Impact 28-IM / 28-IMX	1962	
The New Breed	"John Birch American" / "Lexington Green"	Impact 29-IM / 29-IMX	1962	
Lil' Ray and The Midnighters	"Loretta" / "My Girl"	Impact 30-IM / 30-IMX	1962	
The Alley Kats	"Barbie" / "Lollipops"	Impact 31-IM / 31-IMX		
The Charades Band	"Christina" / "Sophia"	Impact 32-IM / 32-IMX		
Bob Preston	"The Letter" / "Voice Of Liberty"	Impact 33-IM / 33-IMX		
The Capris / The Charades	"Endless Love" / "Luau"	Impact 34-IM / 34-IMX		

Non-music singles
Act	Title	Catalogue	Year	Notes
Dr. W.S. McBirnie	The Great Debate (A Special Radio Speech) / The Great Debate (A Special Radio Speech)	Impact AU-4X / AU-4	Circa; 1964	Non music

Albums
Act	Title	Catalogue	Year	Notes
The Revels	On a Rampage	Impact 1LP-IM / 1LP-IMX	1964	
Various Artists	Shake! Shout! & Soul! Recorded at the Second Annual Surf Fair / Santa Monica, California	Impact LP #2	1964	
