= Exploito =

Music term

Exploito is a term generally given to describe cover version or sound-alike recordings that capitalize on the official recordings of artists. Typically they are of the budget release type of album. Often the buying public would think they are buying an album by the actual artist.

== Background ==
The typical exploito album is aimed at the unsuspecting buyer with the attraction of a budget price. In the United States, Alshire was one label that released this type of album. In Toronto, Ontario, Canada, the label there was Arc. The current hits of the day would be recorded. Sometimes local musicians would be used. Also some extra original compositions would be added by hired writers or people that worked for the label. One example of how an exploito album imitates a genuine release is the Mark, Don & Terry album which has the layout and cover art and design copies a recent release of a legitimate album. They often ended up being put into stores by rack jobbers.

These releases were proliferated by unknown or unpopular artists, with the sound quality and packaging sometimes being considered "bootleg". However, some exploito albums later managed to gain recognition amongst record collectors, such as the Mariano and the Unbelievables album, released in 1967, by a group called "the Blues Train" on a budget exploito label called Condor, alongside releases by exploito-psych bands, the Fire Escape, the 31 Flavours and the Animated Egg .

== Exploito-Psych ==
In the 1960s, exploito-psych (or psychsploitation) records emerged as corporate label cash grabs on the growing psychedelic rock movement, which were marketed to the hippie subculture. These releases, often attributed to fictional bands such as the Fire Escape, the 31 Flavours and the Animated Egg, featured studio session musicians who covered popular acid rock songs and appropriated hippie culture, slang, and iconography in their artwork and liner notes. Labels like Alshire Records and Somerset Records, proliferated these albums, with others sending them off to disc jockeys to play live at hippie events, parties and discotheques. Additionally, records appropriating raga rock and Indian classical music, known as "sitar-sploitation" would also emerge during this period. These records reflected a wider cultural trend of corporate hippie culture or "corporate psychedelia," that emerged in the late 1960s and early 1970s. This phenomenon involved the appropriation of 1960s counterculture aesthetics for commercial purposes, with elements such as long hair and hippie fashion being adopted by the general public.

== Producers and labels ==
Alshire

In 1969, Alshire Records released an album called Famous Songs of Hank Williams: A Return Trip with the Modern Sounds In Modern Rock-Acid Sound, an album that featured musicians covering Hank Williams songs, but in the acid rock genre. The album was a combination of country-style vocals with fuzz guitar and garage rock backing. All Music reviewer Jason Ankeny described the release as "the most absurdly conceived exploito release in the entire Alshire catalog."

Crown, Custom

One label that is well known for exploito and budget albums is Crown Records. Two collectable exploito albums released on the label are The Firebirds Light My Fire album and 31 Flavors Hair album which were both rereleased together on a CD by Gear Fab Records.

Crown's subsidiary Custom put out an album More Psychedelic Guitars which featured the tracks "Another Trip", "Really Got It Bad", "Out Of Touch", The Letdown", Psychedelic A-Go-Go", "Flower Power", Can You Dig It", "Sit- In", "Lost In Space" and "Psychedelic Venture". The artist playing on the album was guitarist Jerry Cole.

Crown and Custom were owned by the Bihari Brothers.

Leo Muller & Stereo Gold Award

One of the producers that has become well known for exploito records is Leo Muller which in fact was an alias for Dave Miller. In 1972, he hired Thin Lizzy musicians Phil Lynott, Eric Bell and Brian Downey to record an album that would be released as Funky Junction Play A Tribute to Deep Purple. The name of Funky Junction would be used again by Muller for the misleadingly titled Especially For You…Gladys Knight and The Pips with guests Funky Junction, released in 1973. The album didn't feature Gladys Knight & the Pips. It featured covers of Gladys Knight songs and two numbers credited to Funky Junction, "Talking Trash" and "Roads End". "Talking Trash" also appeared on Tamla Hits by Dianne And The New Worlds, an album supposedly in the soul genre. "Roads End" would appear on two Jimi Hendrix exploitation albums, Tribute To Jimi Hendrix by Jeff Cooper And The Stoned Wings, and Tribute To Jimi Hendrix by The Purple Fox.

Deacon

Deacon was another budget label that was sold via supermarkets and gas stations. A good deal of its catalogue consisted of orchestral and middle of the road type albums. The label released an album in 1970 called The Golden Hits From The Legend That Was Hank Williams. The credited artist Tex Williams & The Sundowners was displayed on the front cover positioned in the song list column in much smaller writing than the subject that was Hank Williams. In 1972 the label issued Tribute To Johnny Cash. Like the Golden Hits From The Legend That Was Hank Williams release, the credited artist had one part of the name the same as the subject artist. The label even issued a single-sided 45 rpm single aimed at bingo halls with the songs "Let's Play Bingo" and "Bingo Goes Pop".

Sutton

Sutton was founded in 1963 by Bob Blythe, formerly of Tops Records, was a label known for budget exploito albums. One band that had records released under its own name but destined straight for the cut out bins to be filled by the rack jobbers was the New Dimension. Surf music producers Tony Hilder and Bob Hafner provided the material. One album to meet this fate was Soul with The New Dimensions, released on Sutton SSU 336. Another one by the same group was Surf'n Bongos that years later would end up be auctioned under the heading of THE New Dimensions Surf'n Bongos ~ Fuzz Garage Surf Exploito 1963 Sutton LP. As announced by Billboard in 1965, Pat Collins aka the "Hip Hypnotist" was to do a couple of albums for the label.

== Exploiting mainstream artists ==
During the 1960s to 1970s, many releases were made to cash in on the success of several prominent artists, such as Tom Jones, who in 1973, was the subject of a bootleg album by Arc Records called Smash Hits Tom Jones Style which included the songs "A Minute Of Your Time", " Delilah", " Green Green Grass Of Home " and "It's Not Unusual". Arc also issued an album called The Golden Ring Sing The Best Hits Of Tom Jones. There were also other releases on Arc by the so-called The Golden Ring which include Tribute To Glen Campbell, A Tribute To Johnny Cash , Tribute To Elvis and Nat King Cole's Golden Hits etc.

Sam Sorono recorded an album Sam Sorono Sings Tom Jones' Greatest Hits, produced by Chris Babida and released on EMI in 1978. The difference with Sorono was that he was a real singer who eventually moved to the UK. He was based in Bramley, Rotherham. A former actor in Martial arts films, he had been an entertainer in the Philippines. He had played with artists such as Count Basie and Ike and Tina Turner. He died in 2008. Similarly Tony Warren has released covers of Tom Jones' material but he has performed professionally for decades as a Tom Jones impersonator.

== Types of exploito records ==
=== Behavior and pastimes ===
One album that capitalized on human behavior was Music To Strip For Your Man by Teddy Phillips And His Orchestra. In 1963, Sutton released the Surf 'n Bongos album by the New Dimensions. The cover featured swimsuit clad girls with shirtless surfing boys at the beach.

=== Television shows ===
In 1966, a record label called Tifton released an album called Batman And Robin by The Sensational Guitars Of Dan & Dale. The guitars were actually by Danny Kalb and Steve Katz. Sun Ra and Al Kooper played organ.
