= Electrical transcription =

Phonograph recordings made for radio broadcasting

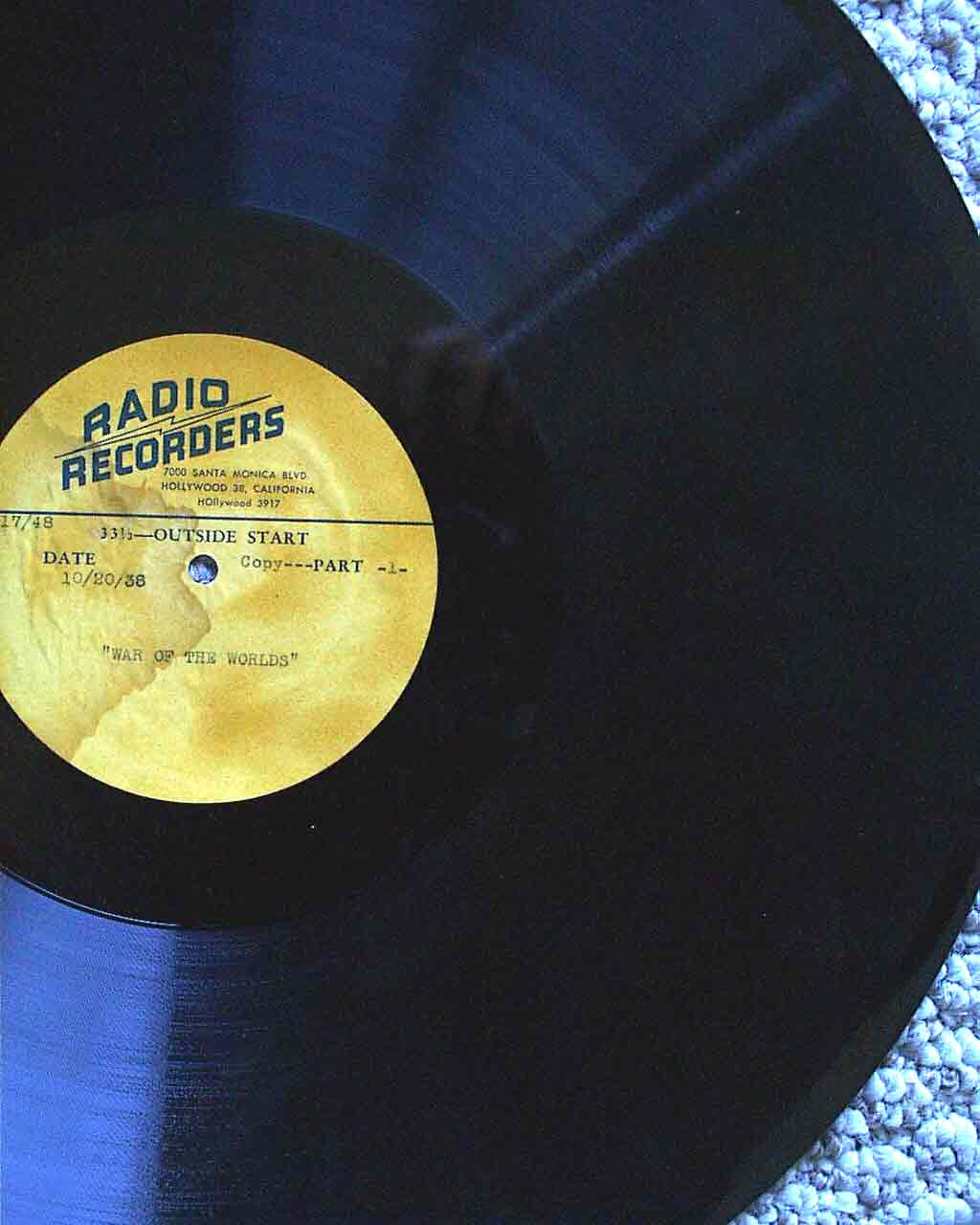
Electrical transcription disc of The War of the Worlds radio broadcast by Orson Welles with this "dubbed" copy created ten years after the original broadcast

Electrical transcriptions are special phonograph recordings made exclusively for radio broadcasting, which were widely used during the "Golden Age of Radio". They provided material—from station-identification jingles and commercials to full-length programs—for use by local stations, which were affiliates of one of the radio networks.

Physically, electrical transcriptions look much like long-playing records, but differ from consumer-oriented recordings in two major respects which gave longer playing time and reduced likelihood of diversion to private use: they are usually larger than 12 inches (300 mm) diameter (often 16 or 17 1/4 inches [410 or 440 mm]) so did not fit on consumer playback equipment, and were recorded in a hill-and-dale, or vertical cutting action, as distinct from lateral modulation as in ordinary monophonic discs. They were distributed only to radio stations for the purpose of broadcast, and not for sale to the public. The ET had higher quality audio than was available on consumer records, largely because they had less surface noise than commercial recordings. Electrical transcriptions were often pressed on vinylite, instead of the more common shellac.

== Emergence ==
Electrical transcriptions were made practical by the development of electrical recording, which superseded Thomas Edison's original purely mechanical recording method in the mid-1920s. Marsh Laboratories in Chicago began issuing electrical recordings on its obscure Autograph label in 1924, but it was Western Electric's superior technology, adopted by the leading labels Victor and Columbia in 1925, which launched the then-new microphone-based method into general use in the recording industry.

Electrical transcriptions were often used for recording programs of genres which would come to be known later as old-time radio.

Although the earliest transcriptions ran at 78.26 rpm or 80 rpm if it was recorded on a three-phase power lathe, some of which were also 12 inches across and laterally recorded with a conventional 3-mil standard-groove stylus, which carried a maximum of 6 minutes per side, the format gave way very quickly to the 33 1/3 rpm speed that would come to be used for Vitaphone talking pictures two years later, which could carry a maximum of 15 minutes per side.

Later ETs would have their groove size reduced first to 2.7 mil and then to the then-standard 1-mil monaural groove used in LPs of the period to squeeze 30 minutes per side onto a transcription.

Freeman Gosden and Charles Correll are credited with being the first to produce electrical transcriptions. In 1928, they began distributing their Amos 'n' Andy program to stations other than their 'home' station, WMAQ in Chicago, by using 12-inch 78 rpm discs that provided two five-minute segments with a commercial break between.

One audio historian wrote: "new methods of electronic reproduction and improved record material that produced very little background noise were developed ... by the end of the decade, the use of old phonograph music had largely been replaced by the new electrical transcription ... with the fidelity available, it was difficult to tell a transcription from the original artist." A 1948 ad for a disc manufacturer touted the use of transcriptions on the Voice of America, saying; "a substantial part of these daily programs is recorded and, due to the excellent quality of these transcriptions, such recorded portions cannot be distinguished from the live transmissions."

WOR in New York City was one of the first radio stations to broadcast transcriptions, starting in 1929. Other stations followed, until more than 100 were doing so, largely because "this new kind of recording made programming more flexible and improved sound." John R. Brinkley is generally credited with being the first performer to provide electrical transcriptions to radio stations. Brinkley's use of the then-new technology arose out of necessity when agencies of the federal government prevented him from crossing from Mexico into the United States to use telephone lines to connect to U.S. stations remotely. "Brinkley began recording ... onto electrical transcription discs and sending them across the border for later broadcast."

WOR used transcriptions for repeat broadcasts of programs. In 1940, for example, the station repeated episodes of Glenn Miller's and Kay Kyser's orchestras, The Goldbergs and Sherlock Holmes.

"Electrical transcriptions were indispensable from the mid '30s to the late '40s," wrote Walter J. Beaupre, who worked in radio before moving into academia.

== Services ==
As radio stations' demand for transcriptions grew, companies specializing in transcriptions grew to meet those demands. In October 1933, 33 companies competed in producing transcriptions. Such companies included Langlois & Wentworth, Inc., RCA Thesaurus, SESAC, World Broadcasting System and Ziv Company. Subscribing to a major transcription service meant a station received an initial group of transcriptions plus periodically issued new discs and a license, which allowed use of the material on-air. Typically, a station did not own the discs; "they were leased for as long as [the] station paid the necessary fees." Those fees typically ranged from $40 to $150 per week for eight 15-minute programs.

Customers for transcriptions were primarily smaller stations. Brewster and Broughton, in their book Last Night a DJ Saved My Life, wrote; (transcriptions) "lessened the reliance on the announcer/disc jockey and, because [a transcription] was made specifically for broadcast, it avoided record company litigation." They quoted Ben Selvin, who worked for a transcription company, as saying, "Most stations could not afford the orchestras and productions that went into the network radio shows, and so we supplied nearly 300 stations with transcriptions that frequently – but not always – featured the most popular bands and vocalists." A slogan used in an advertisement for one transcription service might well have been applied to the industry as a whole: "TRANSCRIBED ... so that advertisers everywhere may have 'radio at its commercial best.'"

A 1948 ad for the transcription service World Broadcasting System contained a letter which praised the company. S.A. Vetter, assistant to the owner of WWPB, AM and FM stations in Miami, Florida, wrote: "you will be interested in knowing that I consider the purchase of the World Feature Library as the best 'buy' I have made in my twenty-one years in Miami radio." The popularity of at least one library was indicated in another 1948 ad. One for Standard Radio Transcription Services, Inc. ad boasted of its Standard Program Library as: "now serving over 700 stations." That same year, an ad for another transcription service, World Broadcasting System, said, "over 640 stations now use this great world library." Another supply company, Associated Program Service, advertised its transcription library as being "not the usual one-shot recording date ... not the routine disc or two ... but real continuity of performance ... a dependable, steady supply of fresh music ... great depth of titles."

Among the companies providing transcription services were radio networks. NBC began its electrical transcription service in 1934. Lloyd C. Egner, manager of electrical transcriptions at NBC wrote that with the NBC Syndicated Recorded Program Service (later named the RCA/NBC Thesaurus Library) the company sought "to make available to stations associated with NBC our extensive programming resources to help in the sale of their facilities to local advertisers." He added: "each program series ... will be as completely programmed as if it were to be for a network client. In other words they will be designed to sell a sponsor's product or service." A 1948 ad for NBC's service touted: "now 25 better shows tailored for better programming at lower cost," adding that the company's material was "programmed and proven over 1000 radio stations." CBS also had a transcription division, called Columbia Recording Corporation.

Capitol Records, better known for its popular recordings, also had a transcription service. An ad in the trade publication Broadcasting asked in a headline if the reader was "finding it tough to sell time?" The ad's text promoted 3,000 selections – with more added monthly – from Peggy Lee, Jan Garber, Johnny Mercer and other "top stars", adding, "more than 300 stations already use it."

One source estimated: "by the end of the 1930s, [transcription] services had built up a market of $10 million."

Transcription services' programming was not limited to music. Mystery, drama and other genres of programming were distributed via transcription. At least two transcribed dramas, I Was a Communist for the FBI and Bold Venture, were distributed to more than 500 stations each. NBC's transcription offerings included Aunt Mary (a soap opera), The Haunting Hour (a psychological mystery), The Playhouse of Favorites (a drama) and Modern Romances.

== Use ==
Advertisers found electrical transcriptions useful for distributing their messages to local stations. Spot advertising is said to have begun in the 1930s. "The spot announcements were easily produced and distributed throughout the country via electrical transcription" as an alternative to network advertising. In 1944, the spot jingle segment of transcriptions was estimated to have an annual value of $10 million.

== Benefits ==
Transcriptions proved advantageous for performers, especially musicians in the Big-Band Era. Using transcriptions helped them reach one audience via radio while making personal appearances in front of other audiences. Additionally, if more stations used their transcriptions, that increased the audience for their music even more. An item in a 1946 issue of Radio Mirror magazine noted: "Bing Crosby's transcription deal with Philco has started a rush of other sought-after radio performers for deals of a similar nature. Their advantages from such a setup include more free time and corporate setups to relieve their tax costs."

Recording commercial jingles for spot announcements was a source of income for performers and writers. In 1944, Cliff Edwards received $1,500 for recording a 30-second gum jingle.

== Government use ==
World War II brought a new use for electrical transcriptions—storage of audio material for broadcasting to people in the military. The American Forces Network began using ETs during that war and continued using them through 1998. More than 300,000 AFRTS electrical transcription discs are stored in a collection at the Library of Congress.

Transcriptions "were often used for ... government-issued programs which were sent to the individual stations for broadcast on designated dates. Recruiting shows for the branches of military service arrived on such discs ... the United States Government shipped many programs during wartime as transcriptions."

During the war, the federal government, in conjunction with the Intercollegiate Broadcasting System, provided "approximately eight 15-minute transcribed programs every week to each of ... 35 college stations." The United States Department of War, United States Department of the Navy, United States Department of the Treasury and United States Office of Education contributed to production of programs related to the war effort, such as The Treasury Star Parade and You Can't Do Business with Hitler.

The Voice of America also used transcriptions, with one disc manufacturer noting in an ad, "A substantial part of these daily programs is recorded ..."

== Other notable uses ==
The network ban on prerecorded material was temporarily lifted on the occasion of the crash of the airship Hindenburg in Lakehurst, New Jersey, on 6 May 1937. A recording of the crash made for Chicago radio station WLS by announcer Herbert Morrison was allowed to be broadcast over the network by NBC. This is the well-known "oh, the humanity!" recording, usually heard only as a brief excerpt and reproduced at a speed which differs significantly from the original recording speed, causing Morrison's voice to sound unnaturally high-pitched and excessively frantic. When heard in its entirety and at the correct speed, the report is still powerful.

Transcription recordings from major American radio networks became commonplace during World War II as pressed vinyl copies of them were distributed worldwide by the U.S. Armed Forces Radio Service for rebroadcast to troops in the field. Disc-to-disc editing procedures were used to delete the commercials included in the original broadcasts, and when a sponsor's name was attached to the name of the program, it was removed as well—Lux Radio Theater, for example, became Your Radio Theater. Although the discs were government property and were supposed to be destroyed after they had served their purpose, some were saved as souvenirs and countless thousands of them were simply dumped rather than actually destroyed. Many of the dumped discs ended up in the hands of scavengers and collectors. Often, these discs are the only form in which the broadcasts on them have survived, and they are one of the reasons why recordings of entertainment broadcasts from the 1940s still exist in abundance.

Many long classical works performed live onstage were captured in a succession of transcription discs. With only 15 minutes per side at 33 1/3 rpm not only did it become necessary to change discs in the middle of a performance, but a careful track needed to be kept of whether sides were recorded in the conventional outside-in format or the reverse style of inside-out, starting near the label and finishing near the edge.

This was due to the large fidelity difference from the variation in circumference on revolutions near the edge of a disc compared to those in the center. Therefore, odd sided discs (1, 3, 5 etc.) were always recorded outside-in with the even-sided discs (2, 4, 6 etc.) were recorded inside-out. Producers would often work with engineers to ensure that loud, active, bombastic or selections requiring a wide dynamic range in order to be reproduced faithfully would always be either near the beginning of odd sides or near the ends of even sides. Often a small amount of overlap occurred which upon transfer to tape years later would have to be discarded except in the cases where the beginning of an even side or the end of an odd side or vice-versa had been damaged during the recording process or subsequent handling. This is why on some CD reissues of this material, a noticeable difference in quality can be ascertained between the two sections.

This practice is preserved for hours-long radio shows up until the 90s when multiple disc sets would be pressed in Radio Format to allow for rapid changing of sides. A) Manual Sequence – Side 1 is backed by Side 2, Side 3 is backed by Side 4, Side 5 is backed by Side 6 etc. B) Automatic Sequence – Side 1 is backed by Side 6, Side 2 is backed by Side 5 and Side 3 remains unchanged backed by Side 4 C) Radio Sequence – Side 1 is backed by Side 4, Side 2 remains unchanged backed by Side 5 and Side 3 is backed by Side 6 to avoid having to turn a record over in the middle instead of being able to cue up the next side next to the one playing to be ready to go.

Well-known live broadcasts which were preserved on lacquer transcription discs include The War of the Worlds dramatized as breaking news by the Orson Welles anthology program The Mercury Theatre on the Air, heard over the CBS radio network on 30 October 1938.

Before magnetic tape recorders became available in the U.S., NBC Symphony Orchestra concert broadcasts were preserved on transcription discs. After its conductor Arturo Toscanini retired, he transferred many of these recordings to tape, with the assistance of his son Walter, and most were eventually released on LP or CD.

In the United States, NBC Radio continued to use the 16-inch disc format for archiving purposes into the early 1970s.

== Transcription discs ==
A transcription disc is a special phonograph record intended for, or recorded from, a radio broadcast. Sometimes called a broadcast transcription or radio transcription or nicknamed a platter, it is also sometimes just referred to as an electrical transcription, usually abbreviated to E.T. among radio professionals.

Transcription discs are most commonly 16 inches (40 cm) in diameter and recorded at 33 1/3 rpm. That format was standard from approximately 1930 to 1960 and physically distinguishes most transcriptions from records intended for home use, which were rarely more than 12 inches (30 cm) in diameter and until 1948 were nearly all recorded at approximately 78 rpm. However, some very early (c. 1928–1931) radio programs were on sets of 12-inch or even 10-inch (25 cm) 78 rpm discs, and some later (circa 1960–1990) syndicated radio programs were distributed on 12-inch 33 1/3 rpm microgroove vinyl discs visually indistinguishable from ordinary records except by their label information.

Some unusual records which are not broadcast-related are sometimes mistakenly described as "transcription discs" because they were recorded on the so-called acetate recording blanks used for broadcast transcriptions or share some other physical characteristic with them. Transcription discs should not be confused with the 16-inch 33 1/3 rpm shellac soundtrack discs used from 1926 into the early 1930s to provide the audio for some motion picture sound systems. Also a potential source of confusion are RCA Victor's "Program Transcription" discs, 10- or 12-inch 33 1/3 rpm records pressed in shellac and "Victrolac" vinyl in the early 1930s. Despite their suggestive name, they were not recorded from broadcasts or intended for broadcast use, but were an early and unsuccessful attempt to introduce longer-playing records at the 33 1/3 rpm speed for home use.

=== Types ===
Transcription discs are of two basic types: pressings and instantaneous discs.

Pressings were created in the same way as ordinary records. A master recording was cut into a blank wax or acetate disc. (Note: Although the word "acetate" has long been standard in the broadcast industry and has come into general use, that term was and is abhorred as technically incorrect by engineers in the record industry, who refer to the discs as "lacquers", because the lacquer coating on them is actually cellulose nitrate, not cellulose acetate.) This was electroplated to produce a metal stamper from which a number of identical discs were pressed in shellac or vinyl in a record press. Although the earliest transcription discs were pressed in shellac, in the mid-1930s quieter vinyl compounds were substituted. These discs were used to distribute syndicated programming to individual radio stations. Their use for this purpose persisted long after the advent of magnetic tape recording because it was cheaper to cut and plate a master disc and press 100 identical high-quality discs than to make 100 equally high-quality tape dubs.

Instantaneous discs are so called because they can be played immediately after recording without any further processing, unlike the delicate wax master discs which had to be plated and replicated as pressings before they could be played non-destructively. By late 1929, instantaneous recordings were being made by indenting, as opposed to engraving, a groove into the surface of a bare aluminum disc. The sound quality of these discs was inadequate for broadcast purposes, but they were made for sponsors and performers who wanted to have recordings of their broadcasts, a luxury which was impractically expensive to provide by the wax mastering, plating and pressing procedure. Only a very few pre-1930 live broadcasts were deemed important enough to preserve as pressings, and many of the bare aluminum discs perished in the scrap metal drives of World War II, so that these early years of radio are mostly known today by the syndicated programs on pressed discs, typically recorded in a small studio without an audience, rather than by recordings of live network and local broadcasts.

In late 1934, a new type of instantaneous disc was commercially introduced. It consisted of an aluminum core disc coated with black cellulose nitrate lacquer, although for reasons which are unclear it soon came to be called an "acetate" disc by radio professionals. Later, during World War II, when aluminum was a critical war material, glass core discs were used. A recording lathe and chisel-like cutting stylus like those used to record in wax would be used to engrave the groove into this lacquer surface instead. Given a top-quality blank disc, cutting stylus, lathe, electronics and recording engineer, the result was a broadcast-quality recording which could be played several times before the effects of wear started to become apparent. The new medium was soon applied to a number of purposes by local stations, but not by the networks, which had a policy against broadcasting prerecorded material and mainly used the discs for archiving "reference recordings" of their broadcasts.

Standard 16-inch transcription discs of the 1930s and 1940s usually held about 15 minutes of audio on each side, but this was occasionally pushed to as much as 20 minutes. Unlike ordinary records, some were recorded inside out, with the start of the recording near the label and the end near the edge of the disc. The label usually noted whether the disc was "outside start" or "inside start". If there was no such notation, an outside start was assumed. Beginning in the mid-1950s, some transcription discs started employing the "microgroove" groove dimensions used by the 12- and 10-inch 33 1/3 rpm vinyl LP records introduced for home use in 1948. This allowed 30 minutes to fit comfortably on each side of a 16-inch disc. These later discs can be played with an ordinary modern stylus or a vintage "LP" stylus. The earlier discs used a larger groove, nearer in size to the groove of a typical 78 rpm shellac record. Using a "78" stylus to play these "standard groove" discs usually produces much better results, and also insures against the groove damage that can be caused by the point of a too-small stylus skating around in the groove and scoring its surface. Some specialist audio transfer engineers keep a series of custom-ground styli of intermediate sizes and briefly test-play the disc with each in order to find the one that produces the best possible results.

== Demise ==
Beginning in the 1940s, two factors caused radio stations' use of transcriptions to diminish. After World War II, use of transcriptions diminished as disc jockeys became more popular. That increased popularity meant that stations began to use commercial recordings more than they had in the past. The trade magazine Billboard reported in a November 22, 1952, article, "Transcription libraries have come upon rough times, owing to the fact that records have largely taken the place of the old-fashioned E.T.'s."

In the 1940s, decreased demand caused transcription services to reduce the royalty they paid copyright owners from $15 per track per year to $10 per track per year. By 1952, still less demand resulted in negotiations for a percentage of gross sales to replace the flat fee.

By late 1959, at least two transcription service companies had gone out of business, selling their libraries to a company that provided recorded background music on tapes and discs. The purchaser acquired a total of approximately 12,000 selections from the two companies.

Magnetic tape and tape recorders became popular at radio stations after World War II, taking over the functions that in-house transcription disc recording had served. Tape's advantages included lower cost, higher fidelity, more recording time, possibility of re-use after erasing, and ease of editing.

Unless the quantity required was very small, pressed discs were a more economical medium for distributing high-quality audio than tape, and CD mastering was, in the early years of that technology, very expensive, so the use of LP-format transcription discs continued into the 1990s. The King Biscuit Flower Hour is a late example, as are Westwood One's The Beatle Years and Doctor Demento programs, which were sent to stations on LP at least through 1992.

== See also ==
- Gramophone record
- List of old-time radio programs
- List of old-time radio people
- List of U.S. radio programs
- Antique radio
- Audio theater
- American Museum of Radio and Electricity
- Broadcasting
- Museum of Television & Radio
- Music radio
- Radio
- Radio comedy
- Radio drama
- Radio programming
- Soap opera
- When Radio Was
