= Hit Records =

- Parent company: Record Service
- Founded: 1962
- Founder: Bill Beasley, Alan Bubis
- Status: defunct
- Genre: Various
- Country of origin: United States
- Location: Nashville, Tennessee
- Official website: Website

Hit Records was a record company based in Nashville, Tennessee, which specialized in sound-alike cover versions of hit records. These types of releases are often categorized as exploito.

== Background ==
It was run by entrepreneurs Bill Beasley and Alan Bubis. The records they produced were sold via convenience stores throughout the United States. Prior to HIT, they started Tennessee Records in 1950 and the Republic label in 1952. In 1959, they took advantage of buying up overstocked hits at low prices and selling them cheaply via the racks throughout the country. Then with Hit Records which they formed, they added their own twin side records to the mix. At 39¢ (US), the records were less than half the price of the hit recordings they were covering. The label was located in Nashville, the home base for the country music recording business in the United States. The company folded in 1969 due to competition from record companies such as K-Tel which issued various artists compilation albums featuring the actual hit recordings licensed from the various record companies. Many Hit Records are very collectable and some of the performers on these recordings have developed their own fan base..

There was also an outfit called Hit Records Inc. in Chicago which had been in business since about 1957. With around 600 outlets, they sold their releases via racks in supermarkets and businesses which included Jewel Food and Osko Drugstores in the Chicago area. This company was owned and managed by Charles Stephens.

== Business history ==
In 1965, legal action was taken against director Beasley and Record Service by Harry Fox Office who were represented by Abeles & Clark, a law firm. This was for royalties relating to recordings on a Hit record album, namely 26 Top Hits. Harry Fox Office won the case and the sum of $37,000 was awarded to them. The money was paid by Record Service, the owner of Hit Records.

== Artists ==
The company had a pool of singers and musicians to record the cover songs. Some of these performers would later become successful on their own such as Sandy Posey, Ray Stevens, Bobby Russell, and Sam Moore of Sam & Dave..

Herbert Hunter, who was a prolific performer on the Hit label, used his own name as well as the name "Leroy Jones" for some of his recordings.
