= Tivoli Theatre (Chicago) =

Coordinates: 41°46′48.4″N 87°36′20.0″W

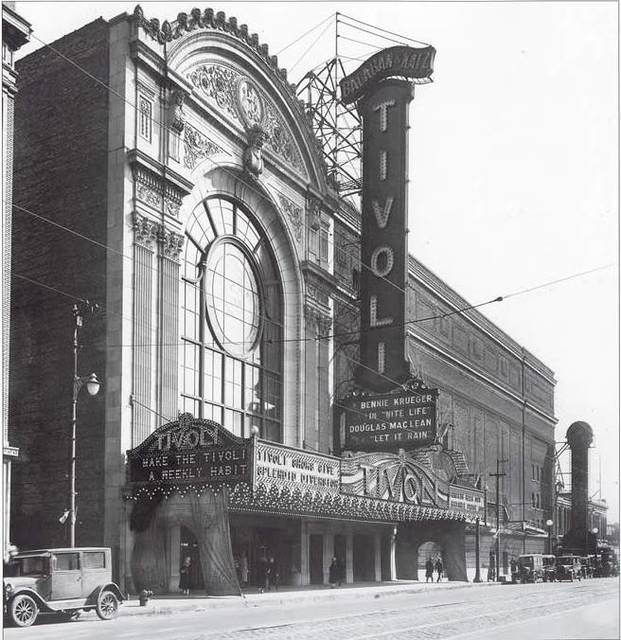
Tivoli Theater

The Tivoli Theatre was a movie palace at 6323 South Cottage Grove Avenue, at East 63rd Street, in the Woodlawn neighborhood of Chicago's South Side. It was the first of the "big three" movie palaces built by the Balaban & Katz theatre chain run by brothers A. J. Balaban, Barney Balaban and their partner Sam Katz, who were also owners of the Rivera Theater (North Side) and the Central Park Theater (West Side), that opened on 16 February 1921.

== History ==
The building itself, a French Baroque styled structure, was designed by architects Cornelius Ward Rapp and George W. Leslie Rapp doing business under the auspices of Rapp and Rapp. The building had an intricate design complete with gold leaf and multicolored marble decor. It was outlined with paintings and ornate sculptures. The theater was two stories high with a painted ceiling in the lobby that was meant to resemble the chapel of the palace at Versailles. The theater held 3,520 patrons around one screen, had air conditioning, and the most up-to-date projection system.

The opening was a gala affair, complete with music from a 55 piece orchestra. The theater cost $2,000,000 to construct; its lobby was two stories high and was able to hold 3,000 people. About 1924-1925 Milton Charles was the resident organist who recorded for Marsh Laboratories on the Autograph label using the new electric recording system of Orlando R. Marsh with microphones, compared to the more common acoustic method using horns. Charles succeeded Jesse Crawford as a Marsh artist after Crawford went to New York to play at the Paramount Theater and eventually record with Victor Talking Machine Company. The theater, which stood just south of the southeast corner of 63rd Street and Cottage Grove Avenue, closed in 1963 and was demolished shortly thereafter.
