= Sutton Records =

American budget record label

- Parent company: Sutten Enterprises
- Founder: Bob Blythe
- Status: defunct
- Genre: Various
- Country of origin: United States
- Location: Hollywood, California

Sutton Records was a budget record label that was sold in outlets other than record shops. The outlets for Sutton were supermarkets, gas stations etc., would be serviced by rack jobbers. In addition to cover versions, the label issued recordings by The Ink Spots, Jesse Crawford and Jimmy Witherspoon.

== Background ==
Sutton was founded by Bob Blythe, the former president of Tops Records. In 1963, the label began with 225 records in its catalogue. Some of the label catalogues that they sourced their recordings from were Music Craft, Omega and Tiara. One solo artist to have a record issued on the label was Jimmy Witherspoon with Stormy Monday And Other Blues By. One of the groups to have albums released on the label was a group called New Dimension who never released any singles. Tony Hilder and Robert Hafner had a deal with Sutton. This is an example of one of the many budget releases were packaged in generic sleeves and sent straight to shops to go into the cut-out bins and racks. In 1965, it was announced in the October 16 issue of Billboard, that Pat Collins aka the "Hip Hypnotist" was to do a couple of albums for the label.

=== Staff ===
Manny Kopelman was a significant shareholder. Vice-president in charge of Sales was Danny Weston. Artie Belnick left Sutton to go and work for Connoisseur Records in 1964.

== Later years ==
Surf Mania by The Surf Teens was originally released on Sutton SU 339 in 1963. In the late 1990s, the Bacchus Archives record label got in touch with producer, Norman Knowles about the Surf Teens' album he produced. Put out by Sutton and handled by the rack jobbers at their usual outlets, and being a budget release, there was no info on the record or the cover about the band. Rumor had it that Knowles had some unreleased recordings of the group which turned out to be true. The record was re-released on vinyl as a limited edition of 500 pressings.

The New Dimensions were a group that had three albums released on the label. They were Deuces and Eights on Sutton 331, Surf'n'Bongos on Sutton 332 and Soul Surf on Sutton 336. In 2014, their Deuces and Eights album was re-released on Rockbeat Records on both LP and CD.

== Catalogue (selective) ==
- The Ink Spots - The Ink Spots Sing Stardust - Sutton SU 219 - (196?)
- The Beagle and the Four Liverpool Whigs - I Want to Hold Your Hand - Sutton SU 229 - (196?)
- Jesse Crawford - Poet Of The Organ Sutton SU 269 - (196?)
- Les Elgart - Les Elgart and Blazing Brass - SU 283 (196?)
- Jimmy Witherspoon - Stormy Monday And Other Blues Sutton SSU 316
- Ann Sothern - Songs Stylings Featuring Ann Sothern And The Blues Of Broadway Sutton SSU 317 - (1963)
- The Pied Pipers - The Smooth Stylings Of The Pied Pipers - Sutton SSU 318 - (1963)
- Diane Coley, The Viscaines, Sims Sisters, The Sparkplugs, Dal Cory - Jumpin! With Pop Hits Of Tomorrow - Sutton SSU 321 - (1963)
- The Spark Plugs - Crazy Beat ! With The Spark Plugs - Sutton 322 - (1963)
- Bobby Baker - Folk Song Fest!! Hootenanny - Sutton SU 330 - (1963)
- The New Dimensions – Deuces And Eights - Sutton – SU 331 - (1963)
- The New Dimensions – Surf'n Bongos (The Great Surfing Rhythms Of The New Dimensions) - Sutton – SSU 332 - (1963)
- Eddie Dean – I Dreamed Of A Hillbilly Heaven- Sutton SU 333 - (1963)
- The New Dimensions – Soul - Sutton SU 336 - (1963)
- Lelani Malani, Eddy Kealoha and The Islanders - Polynesia - Sutton SU 337 - (1963?)
- The Sentinals - Vegas Go Go - Sutton 338
- The Surf Teens – Surf Mania - Sutton SU 339 - (1963)
