= PRI Records =

American record label

PRI Records was an American, Los Angeles-based record label, founded as a division of Precision Radiation Instruments Inc., a Geiger counter manufacturer founded in the 1950s that had expanded into radio manufacturing, marginally profitable, and ultimately the record business by merging with Tops Records in 1958. In 1960, PRI, Tops Records, and its other associated labels were sold to a group of investors and Bob Blythe became the manager. By 1962, the company was bankrupt and sold to Pickwick Records.

The bulk of PRI's releases consist of records made by record producer Dave Pell, who also made recordings for some of PRI's sister labels.
