= Victor Orthophonic Victrola =

First consumer phonograph designed to play electrically recorded phonograph records

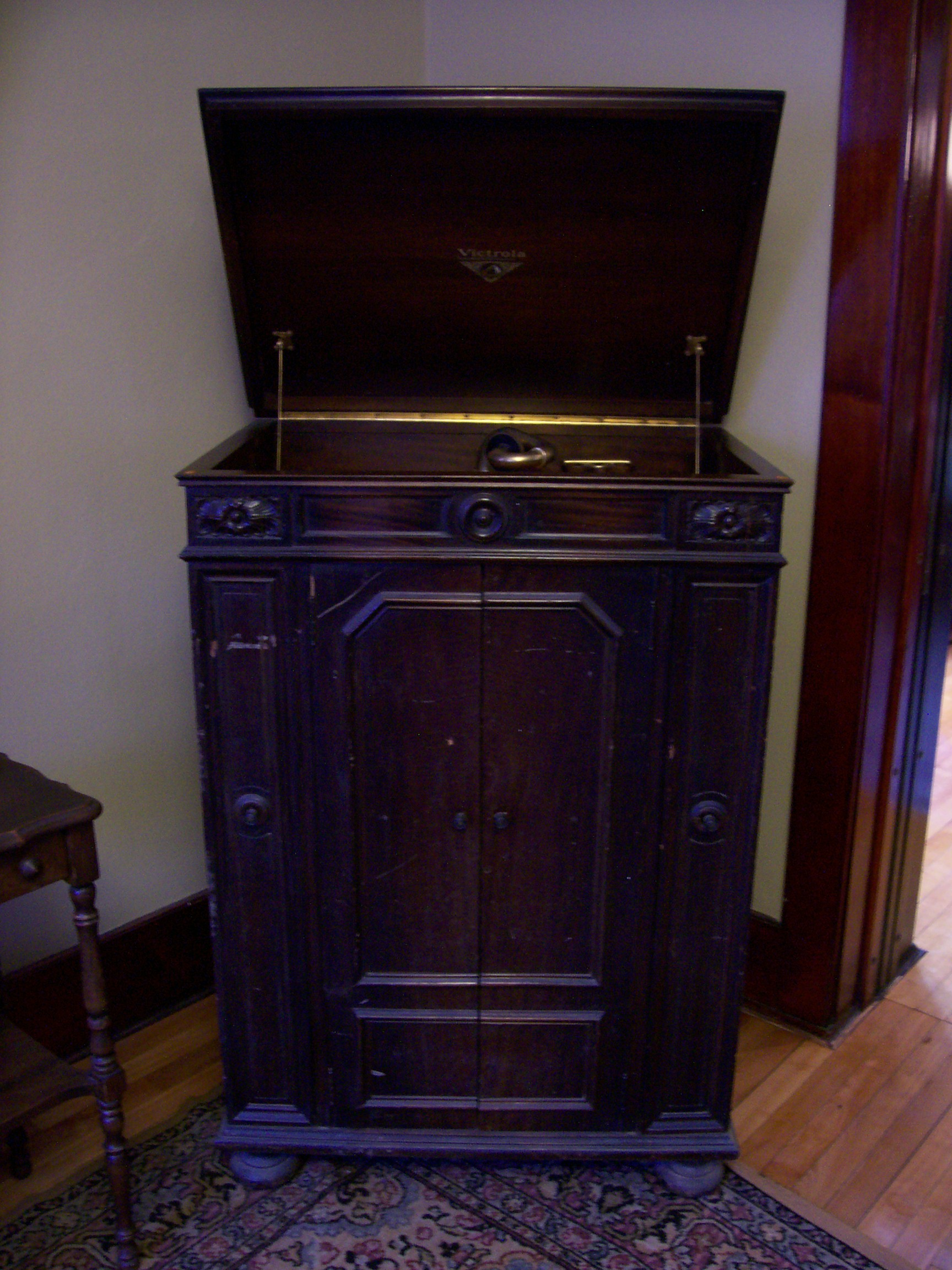
"Credenza" Orthophonic Victrola

The Victor Orthophonic Victrola, released in 1925 by Victor Talking Machine Company, was the first consumer phonograph designed specifically to play electrically recorded phonograph records. The combination was recognized as a major step forward in sound reproduction, with a frequency response of 100-5,000 Hz.

Electrical recording was developed by Western Electric, although a primitive electrical process was developed by Orlando R. Marsh, owner and founder of Autograph Records. Western Electric demonstrated their process to the two leading recording companies, Victor and Columbia, who were initially unwilling to adopt it because they thought it would make their entire existing record catalogs obsolete. However, parched revenues in the record industry caused by the mushrooming new medium of radio soon forced both Victor and Columbia to begin experimental electrical recording.

The design of the Orthophonic was informed by progress in telephony and transmission-line theory. It was developed by two Western Electric researchers, Joseph Maxfield and H. Harrison. Early electrical recordings sounded harsh when played on the acoustic phonographs of the day, which had been designed by trial-and-error, had highly "colored" frequency response, and emphasized higher frequencies. The researchers invented the exponential horn, and, on realizing that it needed to be nine feet (3 meters) long to reproduce the lowest frequencies on the new discs, designed a method for "folding" the horn into a cabinet of practical size. The design was released by Victor as the "Orthophonic" Victrola in the autumn of 1925.

Its first public demonstration was front-page news in The New York Times, which reported that:‍

The audience broke into applause... John Philip Sousa [said] "Gentlemen, that is a band. This is the first time I have ever heard music with any soul to it produced by a mechanical talking machine." ... The new instrument is a feat of mathematics and physics. It is not the result of innumerable experiments, but was worked out on paper in advance of being built in the laboratory.... The new machine has a range of from 100 to 5,000 frequencies [sic], or five and a half octaves.... The "phonograph tone" is eliminated by the new recording and reproducing process.

A Wanamaker's ad from October 31, 1925 invited people to come to "Wanamaker's Salon of Music" and "join the throngs" who were "HEARING the new Victor Orthophonic Victrola .... imagining performers present .... blinking unbelieving eyes" and promising "you will never forget it if you live to be one hundred!"

A historian comments that:

...playing one of the new records on an Orthophonic was a revelation to listeners accustomed to acoustic reproduction: the dramatic increase in volume, the clear sibilants, and, most of all, the amazing reproduction of bass notes. The Orthophonics set the standard in sound reproduction. Backed by advertising which rightly claimed that their sound was vastly superior to any other machine, they sold very well.

As part of a publicity blitz, Victor designated November 2, 1925 as "Victor Day" and, within days, was "swamped with orders exceeding $20 million."‍ (Note: equivalent to $280 million in 2024)

List prices ranged from $95‍ (Note: equivalent to $1,700 in 2025) to $300‍ (Note: equivalent to $5,500 in 2025^{[6]}) depending on cabinetry. $375‍ (Note: equivalent to $6,900 in 2025^{[6]}) "Victrolas with Radiola" incorporated a "five-tube Radiola tuned radio frequency receiver with orthophonic reproduction." A $650‍ (Note: equivalent to $12,000 in 2025^{[6]}) "Victrola-Electrola" incorporated a "two-way valve" allowing both "Orthophonic as well as electrical reproduction", while the $1,000‍ (Note: equivalent to $18,000 in 2025^{[6]}) "Orthophonic Victrola—Radiola and Electrola" had it all, including an eight-tube Radiola Super-Heterodyne.

Dance music enthusiasts were not initially impressed; it was classical music that "sold" the new device.

The Orthophonic became recognized as a status symbol. Liberace's father, for example, though unemployed, maintained his self-image as an artiste by "own[ing] the best record player available, a 'very special Orthophonic Victrola'".

In the early 1950s, the memory of the Orthophonic was fresh enough for RCA Victor to introduce the name "New Orthophonic" for its improved recording process and line of high-fidelity long-playing records, and "Stereo-Orthophonic" was applied to RCA Victor's celebrated "Living Stereo" recordings issued later in the decade.

== See also ==
- Exponential horn – Loudspeaker using an acoustic horn
- History of sound recording
- Victor Talking Machine Company § Electrical recording era
