= Divorce American Style =

1967 film by Bud Yorkin

- Theatrical release poster
- Directed by: Bud Yorkin
- Screenplay by: Norman Lear
- Story by: Robert Kaufman
- Produced by: Norman Lear
- Starring: Dick Van Dyke; Debbie Reynolds; Jason Robards; Jean Simmons; Van Johnson
- Cinematography: Conrad L. Hall
- Edited by: Ferris Webster
- Music by: Dave Grusin
- Production companies: National General Production Inc. Tandem Productions
- Distributed by: Columbia Pictures
- Release date: June 21, 1967 (Los Angeles)
- Running time: 109 minutes
- Country: United States
- Language: English
- Box office: $12 million

Divorce American Style is a 1967 American satirical comedy film directed by Bud Yorkin and starring Dick Van Dyke, Debbie Reynolds, Jason Robards, Jean Simmons, and Van Johnson. Norman Lear produced the film and wrote the screenplay, based on a story by Robert Kaufman. It focuses on a married couple who opt for divorce when counseling fails to help them resolve their various problems, and the problems presented to divorced people by alimony. The title is an homage to Divorce Italian Style (1961). Some of the film's plot, such as the maritial separation, the attempt to remarry of one the divorcing spouses and the wife being presuaded to call off the divorce, also resembles the 1964 Andy Griffith Show episode with a similar title. "Divorce, Mountain Style."

== Plot ==
After 17 years of marriage, affluent Los Angeles suburban couple Richard Harmon (Van Dyke) and his wife Barbara (Reynolds) seem to have it all, but they are constantly bickering. When they discover they can no longer communicate properly, they make an effort to salvage their relationship through counseling, but after catching each other emptying their joint bank accounts (at the urging of friends), they file for divorce.

After his take-home income has been cut dramatically by high alimony, Richard finds himself living in a small apartment, driving a VW Beetle and trying to survive on $87.30 a week (when a McDonald's hamburger dinner cost him 67 cents).

Richard meets a recently divorced man, Nelson Downes (Robards), who introduces him to ex-wife Nancy (Simmons). Nelson wants to marry off Nancy to be free of his alimony burden, so he can marry his pregnant fiancée. Nancy also wishes to marry because she is lonely. To end Richard's alimony woes, Nelson and Nancy plot to set up Barbara with a millionaire auto dealer, Big Al Yearling (Johnson), and the two begin a relationship.

On the night before the Harmon divorce becomes final, all three couples meet to celebrate the success of their plans. At a nightclub, the real-life hypnotist Pat Collins pulls Barbara from the audience and puts her into a trance. After inducing her into performing a mock striptease, she instructs Barbara to kiss her true love. Barbara plants one on Richard, and they realize they love each other too much to go through with the divorce. An undeterred Nelson immediately tries to get Nancy interested in Big Al.

== Cast ==
- Dick Van Dyke as Richard Harmon
- Debbie Reynolds as Barbara Harmon
- Jason Robards as Nelson Downes
- Jean Simmons as Nancy Downes
- Van Johnson as Al Yearling
- Joe Flynn as Lionel Blandsforth
- Shelley Berman as David Grieff
- Martin Gabel as Dr. Zenwinn
- Lee Grant as Dede Murphy
- Pat Collins as Herself
- Tom Bosley as Farley
- Emmaline Henry as Fern Blandsforth
- Dick Gautier as Larry Strickland
- Tim Matheson as Mark Harmon (credited as Tim Matthieson)
- Gary Goetzman as Jonathan Harmon
- Eileen Brennan as Eunice Tase
- Shelley Morrison as Jackie
- Bella Bruck as Celia
- John J. Anthony as Judge

== Reception ==
The film earned an estimated $5,150,000 in North American rentals in 1967.

=== Critical response ===
In his review in the Chicago Sun-Times, Roger Ebert called the film "a member of that rare species, the Hollywood comedy with teeth in it" and added, "Bud Yorkin has directed with wit and style, and the cast, which seems unlikely on paper, comes across splendidly on the screen . . . The charm of this film is in its low-key approach. The plot isn't milked for humor or pathos: Both emerge naturally from familiar situations."

Variety observed, "Comedy and satire, not feverish melodrama, are the best weapons with which to harpoon social mores. An outstanding example is Divorce American Style . . . which pokes incisive, sometimes chilling, fun at US marriage-divorce problems."

The New York Times film critic Bosley Crowther disliked the film, saying, "it is rather depressing, saddening, and annoying, largely because it does labor to turn a solemn subject into a great big American-boob joke." Crowther criticized Van Dyke's performance, remarking, "He is too much of a giggler, too much of a dyed-in-the-wool television comedian for this serio-comic husband role."

A 2012 review in Time Out cited "Two or three very funny scenes . . . and a first-rate batch of supporting performances."

=== Accolades ===
Norman Lear and Robert Kaufman were nominated for the Academy Award for Best Original Screenplay, but lost to William Rose for Guess Who's Coming to Dinner. Lear also was nominated for the Writers Guild of America Award for Best Written American Comedy.

== Novelization ==
About two months prior to the release of the film—as was customary of the era—a paperback novelization of the screenplay was published; in this case by Popular Library, commissioning editor Patrick O'Connor. The author was Jackson (in later years aka Jack) Donahue. Donahue started his career as a police reporter and went on to become managing editor of several major newspapers. He had already written a number of well-regarded novels (among them The Confessor and Erase My Name) by the time he took on the adaptation of Divorce American Style. He would also write several works of non-fiction, including co-authorship of Leon Jaworski's Watergate memoir, The Right and the Power.

== See also ==
- List of American films of 1967
