= Jobber (merchandising) =

Business that buys merchandise in bulk and sells to retailers

Jobber, in merchandising, can be synonymous with "wholesaler", "distributor", or "intermediary". A business which buys goods and bulk products from importers, other wholesalers, or manufacturers, and then sells to retailers, was historically called a jobbing house (or jobbing center). A jobber is a merchant—e.g., (i) a wholesaler or (ii) reseller or (iii) independent distributor operating on consignment—who takes goods in quantity from manufacturers or importers and sells or resells or distributes them to retail chains and syndicates, particularly supermarkets, department stores, drug chains, and the like. One objective is to distribute goods at lower costs through economies of scale, which, in sophisticated operations, typically uses complex transportation models. In competitive markets, the practice is an integral part of supply chain management—one that might incorporate, among other things, operations research in areas of logistics involving supply chain networking, and supply chain optimization. A jobber is very different from a broker. A broker transacts on behalf of a merchandiser while a jobber supplies inventory at a merchandiser's site for consumers to purchase.

== Usage and etymology ==
The word "jobber" is sometimes dismissed as colloquial or obsolete. As of 2016, it is used in the industry sciences, trade press, popular media, and scholarly journals. The current meaning of jobber has been in existence since the introduction of the factory system, and earlier in cases with respect to importing goods. The word has a longstanding history in merchandising and can be found in print around the mid-19th century. and variations, such as "pig jobber", date back to the 18th century. (Note: "Pig-jobber," from the British & World English Dictionary, Oxford Dictionaries, states that its use is from the early 18th century; earliest use found in a 1757 book, Observations in Husbandry: 1. Observations in Husbandry (2nd ed., Vol. 2 of 2), by Edward Lisle (1666–1722), printed posthumously by John Hughs (1703–1771) near Lincoln's Inn Fields for Charles Hitch ( –1764) and Lacy Hawes (1698–1776), James Rivington (1724–1802) and James Fletcher, Sr. (1710–1795), in St. Paul's Church Yard, and Robert and James Dodsley in Pall Mall, London, 1757, pg. 329; OCLC 11645852; 2. "Pig-jobber," OxfordDictionaries.com (retrieved 14 January 2016)) Jobbing was the subject of legislation in England in 1670 when a special act was enacted to prevent fraud in the buying and selling of cattle at Smithfield Market, London. CRC jobber see M George.

== Used in the following contexts ==
- Car lot jobber (as in fruits and vegetables) (1914)
- Fuel jobber
- Rack jobber
- Jobbing house
- Meat jobber
- Record jobber
- Pig jobber
- Land jobber (1800)
- Jobber (1719)
- CRC Jobber (2004)

== See also ==
- Jobbers Canyon Historic District, Omaha, Nebraska
