= Bob Blythe =

- Born: Robert Blythe
- Occupation(s): Pen manufacturer, Record executive
- Years active: 1940s - ??
- Labels: Tops Records; Sutton Records

Bob Blythe was an American ball point pen manufacturer and owner of BB pens. Later he was president of a record company, Tops Records, as well as founder of budget record label Sutton Records.

== Background ==
Blythe was a former vaudevillian who drove around in a yellow convertible. He would hire actors to work in his pen factory.

=== BB Pens ===
He partnered up with Jack Stein, a Los Angeles surgeon. They began the pen operation in Mrs. Stein's kitchen, but as a result of making a mess in the sink, they moved it to Stein's garage. Later they were on the verge of having a $1,250,000 contract for a chain of jewelry stores signed but it didn't eventuate because a pen exploded in the face of the director of the stores. After that they had to start again. By 1949, it was forecasted that year that the company would produce 20 million pens.

=== Tops Records ===
In 1958 Blythe was hired by Tops Records. In early April 1959, Blythe bought into Tops Records and became the largest shareholder. At the time, Blythe who had 25 years experience in chain store merchandising was entering his first venture into the record business. As of March 1960, he still retained his position, vice-president of sales. He was no longer the owner of BB Ball Point Pen Company by that time.

In August 1960, Blythe embarked on a 3-week trip across the United States to meet with distributors.

=== Sutton Records ===
By 1963, Tops Records was in liquidation. A liquidation sale was advertised in the March 9 issue of Billboard.

In 1963, it was reported in the March 2 issue of Billboard that Blythe had launched a new record label called Sutton Records, a subsidiary of his recently formed Sutton Enterprises. This low-budget label was one that would cater outlets serviced by rack jobbers. On board with Blythe was stockholder Manny Kopelman and sales vice-president Danny Weston.
