= Rack jobber =

Company that sells products in a store

A rack jobber (also known as a rack merchandiser) is a company or trader having an agreement with a retailer to display and sell products in a store. The outlets for the products would be ones which traditionally do not stock such products such as gas stations, grocery stores, and others not traditionally associated with the products sold. Often the products are of a budget variety.

== Etymology of the phrase ==
The term "jobber" can be synonymous with wholesaler or intermediary in merchandising. The term dates to the mid-19th century and earlier. The rack jobber retains ownership of the products, reducing the potential loss incurred by the retailer from lack of product sales. The proceeds of the sale from the product are then divided/shared by the rack jobber and retailer. Rack jobbers have played a role in the music industry: in the 1930s the Music Dealers Service was a rack jobber operating music sheet racks. LP records have been supplied to stores in this fashion.

Other items rack jobbers have supplied include beauty aids, greeting cards, hardware, paperback books and toys. The display, maintenance, accounting, and stock rotation of the merchandise are the responsibility of the rack jobber who must periodically come into the store. Using a rack jobber especially appeals to retailers that do not specialize in the product category; a mass merchandiser, for example, that sells computer software and does not have the expertise for product selection.

== LP Records ==
The first LP rack jobber in the U.S. was Elliott Wexler (1913–1966) who started Music Merchants in Philadelphia in 1952.

One record label whose catalogue was sold via rack jobbers was Sutton, founded by Bob Blythe, the former president of Tops Records. The label launched in 1963 with 225 records in its catalog, which was sourced from labels that included Music Craft, Omega and Tiara. Another record label that found its way into the racks was Crown Records, a budget label owned by the Bihari brothers. In the 1960s, one third of record sales were from records sold via rack jobbers. Eventually the rack jobbers moved into more traditional department stores by making arrangements with the retailer in various ways. One of them was asking the retailer to allow a certain amount of sell-space and the rack jobber deciding what goes in the space. Also there could be a verbal guarantee that all of the products would be sold and if not, the next time around, the rack jobber would bring back merchandise that would.

"Grandma Got Run Over by a Reindeer" became a perennial hit in part through its distribution via rack jobbing at pharmacies.

== Toys ==
Brian Heiler runs the website plaidstallions.com that features rack toys, and has written a book about them, Rack Toys: Cheap, Crazed Playthings (2012) ISBN 978-0991692200. Many of these toys involved slapping product licenses (usually in the form of stickers with logos and sometimes imagery) on generic toys before Ronald Reagan lifted the prohibition on toys based on television shows or vice versa. Some early 1980s shows such as Manimal had rack toys based on them that featured the title character midway in transition from human to lion and human to cobra. Rack toy licenses included Star Trek, Space: 1999, Kojak, Police Woman, Land of the Lost, The Sword and the Sorcerer, The Lone Ranger, Planet of the Apes, The Phantom, Flash Gordon, The Mod Squad, M*A*S*H/Trapper John, M.D., The Brady Bunch, Simon & Simon, Matt Houston, The Dukes of Hazzard, Dick Tracy, Annie, Laverne & Shirley, CHiPS, The Love Boat, Mr. Smith, Airwolf, B.J. and the Bear, Street Hawk, The A-Team, Mr. T. Knight Rider, Baywatch, The Simpsons, 1941, The Patriot, The Karate Kid, American Ninja, Rocky, The Delta Force, The Martian Chronicles, Captain Scarlet and the Mysterons, The Mighty Hercules, Groovie Goolies, The Banana Splits, The Woody Woodpecker Show, The Perils of Penelope Pitstop, Dick Dastardly, Mighty Mouse, Josie and the Pussycats, Dr. Shrinker, Spectreman, Ultraman, Manta and Moray, Space Sentinels, Universal Monsters, The Mighty Crusaders, Tex Starr, Popeye, Tarzan, The Shadow, Disney, Hanna-Barbera, Marvel Comics, and DC Comics.

Common examples of rack toys include parachuters, motorcycles, helicopters, water guns, make-up kits, doctor kits, barber/hair styling kits, nurse kits, construction kits, and character figures--frequently bendables or with little or none of the articulation of action figures.

== See also ==
- Jobbing house
