= Autograph Records =

American record label

- Parent company: Marsh Laboratories
- Founded: 1920s
- Founder: Orlando R. Marsh
- Status: Defunct
- Genre: Jazz
- Country of origin: U.S.
- Location: Chicago, Illinois

Autograph Records was an American record label in the 1920s owned by Marsh Laboratories of Chicago, Illinois, which was owned by Orlando R. Marsh, an electrical engineer.

Marsh made recordings by his own experimental methods. Autograph was the first U.S. record label to release recordings made electrically with microphones, as opposed to the acoustical or mechanical method that was more commonly used. According to author Brian Rust, Marsh's first electrical records were made in 1924.

== Organ music ==
It was reported in Time on April 28, 1923, that a device invented by Marsh was successfully used to make a recording of organ music, until then considered impossible. The article stated that Pietro Yon from New York City played his organ composition "Jesu Bambino" in Marsh's Chicago laboratory, and that the reproduction was described as excellent. The article went on to say that this accomplishment appeared to open a new area for the phonograph.

Brian Rust also reported that there was a note in the Talking Machine Journal for October 1924 indicating that "Orlando B. Marsh" had just moved to 78 East Jackson Boulevard. Marsh Laboratories became established on the seventh floor of the Lyon & Healy Building. This location attracted customers. Lyon & Healy sold sheet music, records, and musical instruments.

== Discs ==
Autograph is best known for some of the fine jazz by artists in Chicago which was recorded on the label. The most famous of all are the duets by King Oliver and Jelly Roll Morton. Autograph's bestselling records, however, were the series of pipe organ solos by Jesse Crawford. Marsh's electrical process was the first to be able to capture an approximation of the range of the organ, but it lacked bass in the tone mix.

About the time that the Autograph records of Crawford were made, Jesse Crawford accepted an offer to be organist at the Paramount Theatre in New York City. Once there, the Victor became interested in having Crawford make recordings for them, first by the acoustical process. Later, Victor recorded Crawford by the Western Electric-licensed process first used by them in 1925.

Milton Charles succeeded Jesse Crawford as organist at the Chicago Theatre and also as the organist used by Orlando Marsh. Charles was recorded by Marsh Laboratories at the Tivoli Theatre (Chicago) with releases on Paramount Records. The Paramount recordings were technically superior to those made at the Chicago Theatre.

The last Autograph records seem to have been recorded in 1926.

Although no longer releasing sides under his own label, Marsh continued to make recordings in Chicago for other labels (including Paramount, Gennett, and Black Patti) through the end of the 1920s.

== Radio ==
Amos 'n' Andy was the first radio program to be distributed by recorded syndication, and Marsh Laboratories played a role in this. Elizabeth McLeod indicated in an e-mail of December 27, 2002, that recordings by Freeman Gosden and Charles Correll were made in advance of the live airing of the Amos 'n' Andy radio shows on WMAQ (AM), Chicago, in the 1928–1929 period at Marsh Laboratories. These were pressed for distribution to other radio stations as 12" shellac 78 rpm discs. She indicated that a speed around 80 rpm was sometimes more accurate. On April 29, 1929, the recording contract went to Brunswick-Balke-Collender (Brunswick Corporation) and the audio quality of the discs improved substantially.

== See also ==
- List of record labels
