= Paramount Theatre (Manhattan) =

Former movie theater in New York City

Coordinates: 40.75713°N 73.986488°W

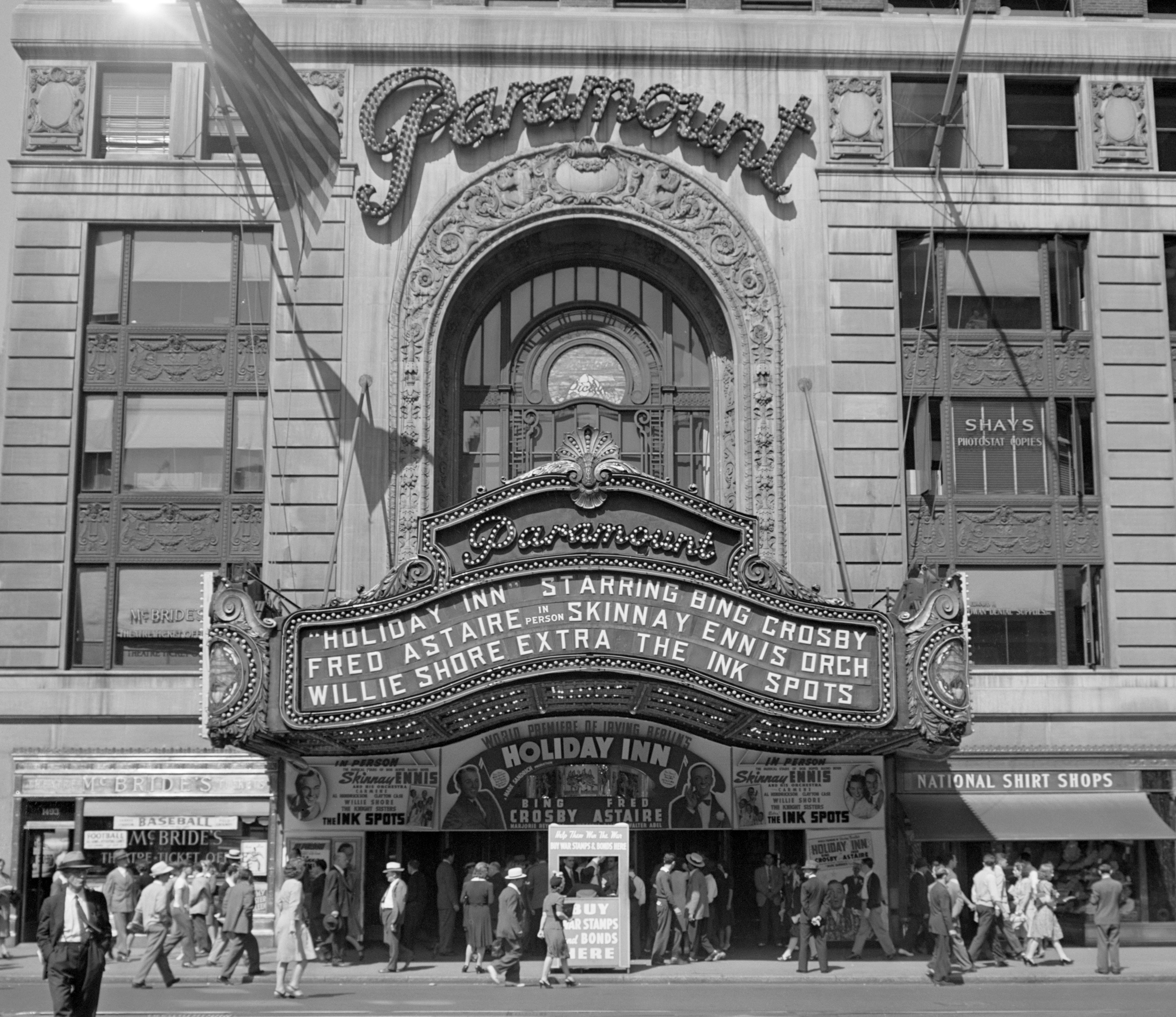
- Premiere of Irving Berlin's Holiday Inn at the Paramount Theatre (August 4, 1942)
- Interactive map of Paramount Theatre
- Address: 1501 Broadway; New York City; United States
- Capacity: 3,664
- Type: movie palace
- Current use: office and retail

Construction
- Opened: November 19, 1926
- Closed: February 21, 1966
- Architect: Rapp & Rapp

The Paramount Theatre was a 3,664-seat movie palace located at 43rd Street and Broadway on Times Square in Midtown Manhattan, New York City. Opened in 1926, it was a showcase theatre and the New York headquarters of Paramount Pictures. Adolph Zukor, founder of Paramount predecessor Famous Players Film Company, maintained an office in the building until his death in 1976. The Paramount Theatre eventually became a popular live performance venue. The theater was closed in 1964 and its space converted to office and retail use. The tower which housed it, known as the Paramount Building at 1501 Broadway, is in commercial use as an office building and is still home to Paramount Pictures offices.

Following the closing of the Times Square Paramount Theatre, two other theaters in Manhattan have had the same name: the Paramount Theatre at Madison Square Garden and a now-demolished movie theater at the Gulf and Western Building (15 Columbus Circle). The Brooklyn Paramount Theater, also in New York City, opened in 1928.

== History ==
The Paramount Theatre opened on November 19, 1926, with the gala premiere of Herbert Brenon's God Gave Me Twenty Cents, with guests including Mayor Jimmy Walker, Thomas Edison, Will H. Hays and Florenz Ziegfeld Jr. as guests. The stage gala was produced by John Murray Anderson.

The theater housed one of the largest and most admired theater organs built by the Wurlitzer company. Designed for the famous organist Jesse Crawford, the organ was used for solos and to accompany silent films. The organ had 36 ranks of voiced metal and wooden pipes weighing a total of 33 tons. Crawford, who advised on the construction and installation of the organ, was the theater's featured organist from the 1926 opening until 1933. The organ continued to be played intermittently throughout the Paramount's history by George Wright and other noted organists. In 1959, a recording of Richard Leibert playing the Wurlitzer organ, Sing a Song with Leibert, was produced by Westminster Records.

The murals in the theater's dome, Grand Hall and Elizabethan Room were painted by the Chicago-based artist Louis Grell. Grell was noted for murals that he painted in the 1920s and 1930s in many Rapp and Rapp-designed theaters in the Paramount-Publix chain.

The Paramount began hosting live music along with its feature films as the swing era got underway. Glen Gray's orchestra was the first live band to play there during the week of Christmas 1935. Over the following years, the Paramount became the leading band house in the United States, as performers such as Benny Goodman, Jack Benny, Tommy Dorsey, the Andrews Sisters, Ray Herbeck, Harry James, Phil Spitalny, Xavier Cugat, Fred Waring, Eddy Duchin, Gene Krupa, Augusto Brandt, Bill Kenny & The Ink Spots, Glenn Miller, and Guy Lombardo played extended runs there. The use of the Paramount by the big bands was immortalized in Barry Manilow's 1994 song "Singin' with the Big Bands" from the album of the same name.

Leo Fuld, Billy Eckstine, Perry Como, Frank Sinatra, Dean Martin and Jerry Lewis all enjoyed success performing there.

With the theater spin off in 1950, Paramount Pictures rented the theater to United Paramount Theatres. During the 1950s, along with the Paramount Theatre in Brooklyn, it was the site of live rock'n'roll shows presented by promoter Alan Freed. It was also the site of the world premiere of Love Me Tender, Elvis Presley's first movie. Thousands of fans gathered outside the Paramount Building, which was adorned with a huge paperboard picture of Presley, on the night of the premier. Also, Buddy Holly & The Crickets performed "Peggy Sue" there after becoming a big hit.

The last showing under United Paramount Theatre (UPT) ownership was The Carpetbaggers. The theater closed on August 4, 1964, under UPT ownership, only to be reopened one month later on September 4, owned by Webb and Knapp. The Beatles 1964 United States summer tour concluded there with a charity concert for Cerebral Palsy on September 20.

On February 21, 1966 after a run of the James Bond film, Thunderball, the Paramount was closed for good and later gutted and turned into retail and office space for The New York Times. The entrance arch was closed in and the marquee removed. There was no trace of the theater remaining, but in 1999, a large section of the Broadway office building was leased by World Wrestling Federation (WWF), which recreated the famous arch and marquee (with the Paramount logo restored) and developed the space into WWF New York, a themed club and restaurant, though after a legal battle with the World Wildlife Fund in 2002, the complex was renamed The World. The WWE operation closed in 2003, and the location then became home to the Hard Rock Cafe, relocated from its previous home on 57th Street.

The Paramount's Wurlitzer organ was removed prior to the theater's demolition and installed in the Century II Convention Hall in Wichita, Kansas in 1968. The organ continues to be used today for concerts and other events.

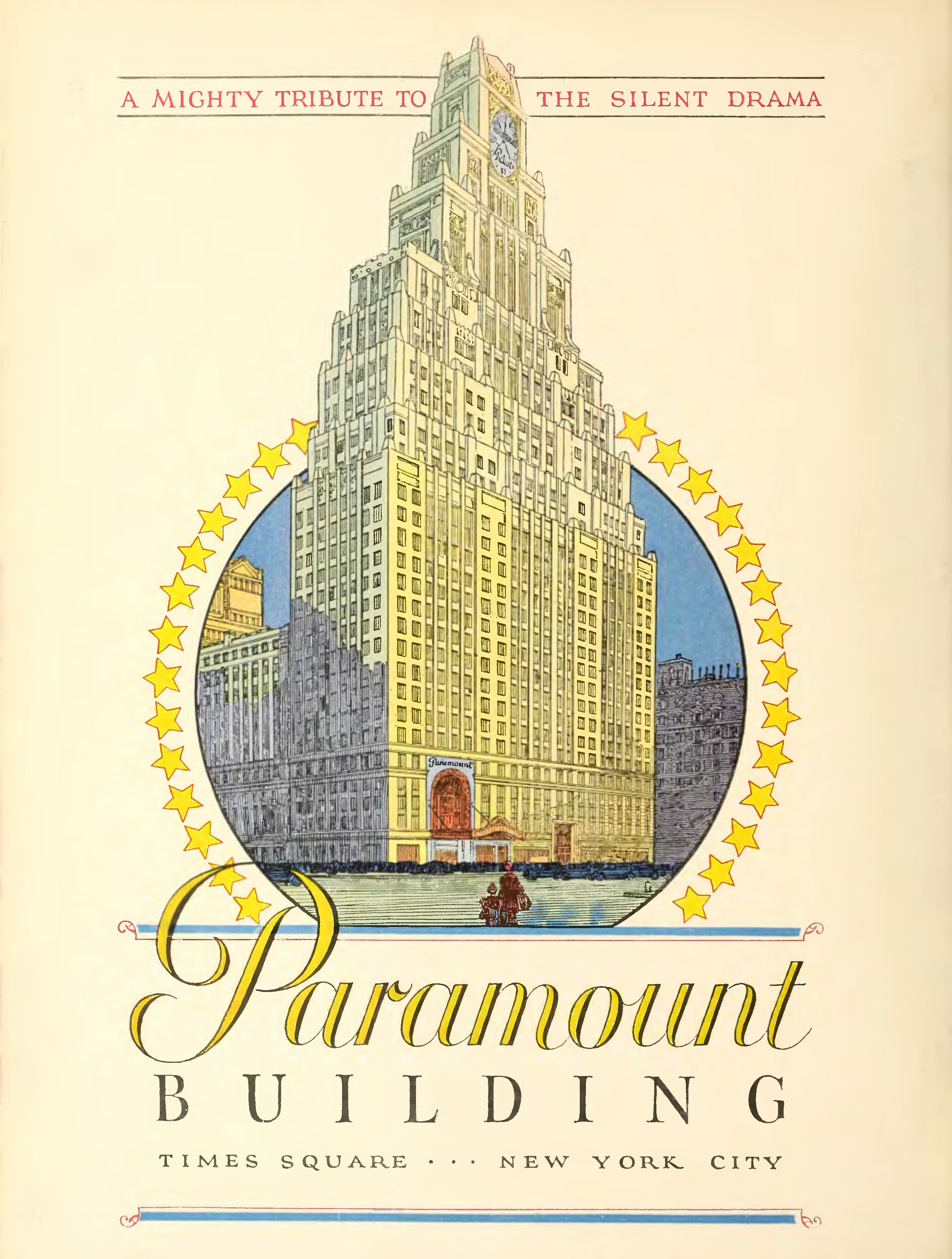
Advertisement for the Paramount Building, with the Paramount Theatre behind at left (April 17, 1926)

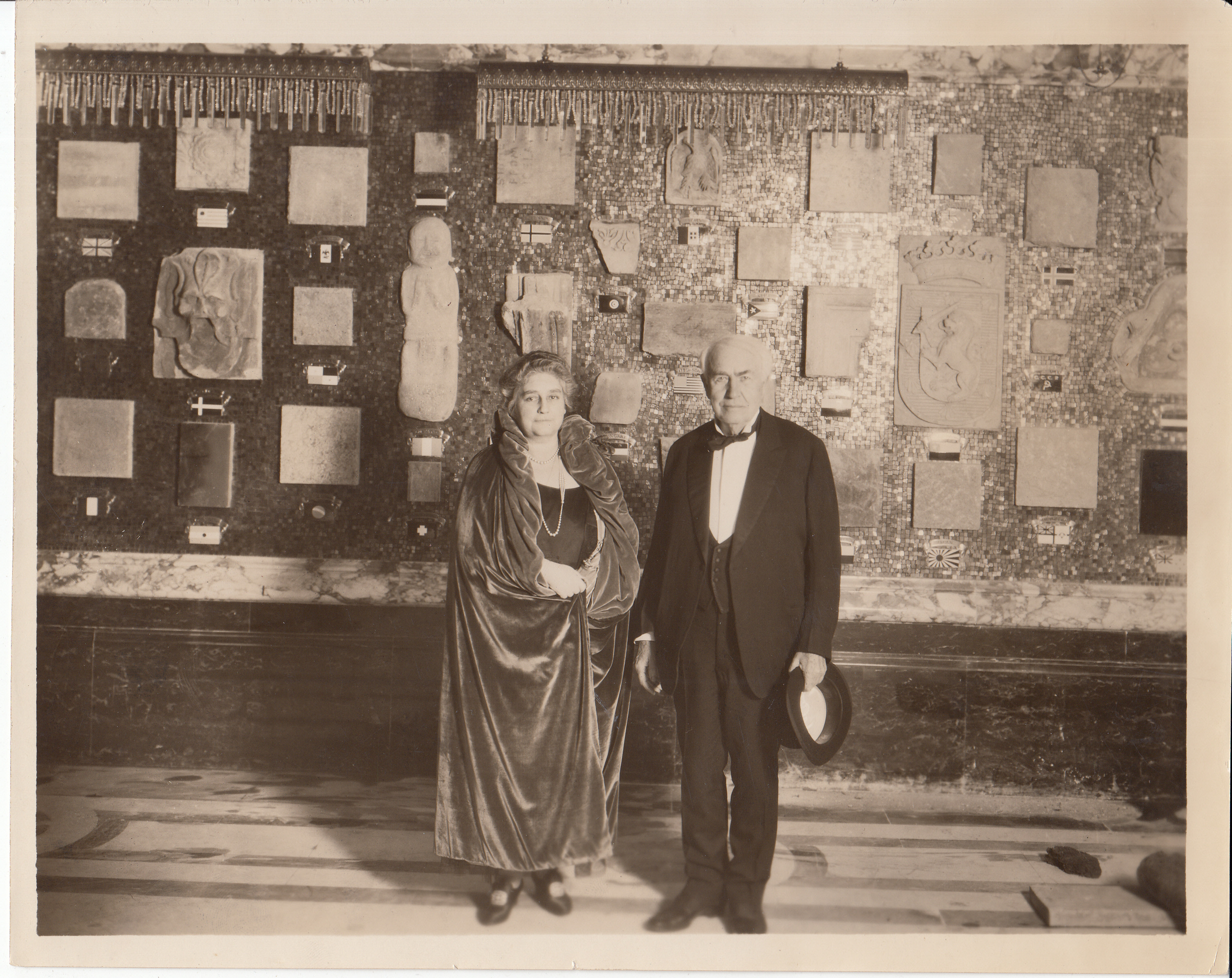
Mina and Thomas Edison at the opening of the Paramount Theatre (November 19, 1926)

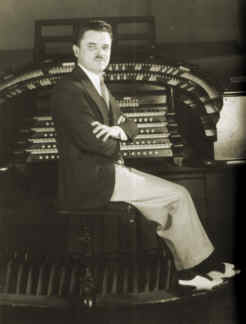
Jesse Crawford at the Wurlitzer

== See also ==
- Madison Square Garden. For a short while in the late 1980s and early 1990s, The Theater at Madison Square Garden was called the New Paramount Theater after a corporate merger. Before it was called the Paramount, it was known as the Felt Forum.
- 1501 Broadway
