= Pat Collins (hypnotist) =

American hypnotist (1935–1997)

- Born: May 7, 1935; Detroit, Michigan
- Died: May 31, 1997 (aged 62); San Bernardino, California
- Occupation: Hypnotist

Patricia Ann Collins (May 7, 1935 – May 31, 1997) was an American hypnotist.

== Early life ==
Collins was born in Detroit, Michigan, on May 7, 1935. She spent most of her childhood in orphanages and foster homes.

== Career ==
Collins mentioned in interviews that hypnosis helped her recover from a nervous breakdown. She later studied the art and came up with a nightclub act in which she would hypnotize volunteers from the audience. She owned a nightclub on the Sunset Strip in West Hollywood, where she would perform her act, as well as use hypnosis for therapeutic purposes. She became known as the "Hip Hypnotist". At her zenith, Collins earned $4,000 weekly.

In 1966, Collins appeared as herself on The Lucy Show, in an episode titled "Lucy and Pat Collins", on which she hypnotized Lucille Ball's and Gale Gordon's characters, Lucy Carmichael and Mr. Theodore J. Mooney. She also appeared in the film Divorce American Style. Collins was seen on the panel shows What's My Line? and I've Got a Secret and on the game show Hollywood Squares.

Collins resided in Beverly Hills until 1983. She then moved to Reno, Nevada, performing there and in Lake Tahoe through 1992, when she moved to San Bernardino with ill health.

Among the celebrities whom Collins hypnotized were Steve Allen, Jill St. John, and Lloyd Bridges. Reportedly, she helped Hall of Fame pitcher Sandy Koufax cut down on his smoking habit, from one and a half packs a day to three cigarettes a day. She counted Robert Wagner and Ed Begley, Sr. as friends.

Collins also released two records; Sleep With Pat Collins! (The Hip Hypnotist) (1963) and Turn On! The Power Of The Mind (1967) featuring her hypnosis routines.

== Personal life ==
Collins had two daughters, a son, and six grandchildren at the time of her death.

She died at her home in San Bernardino, California, on May 31, 1997. She had been unwell for several years following a stroke.
