= Orlando R. Marsh =

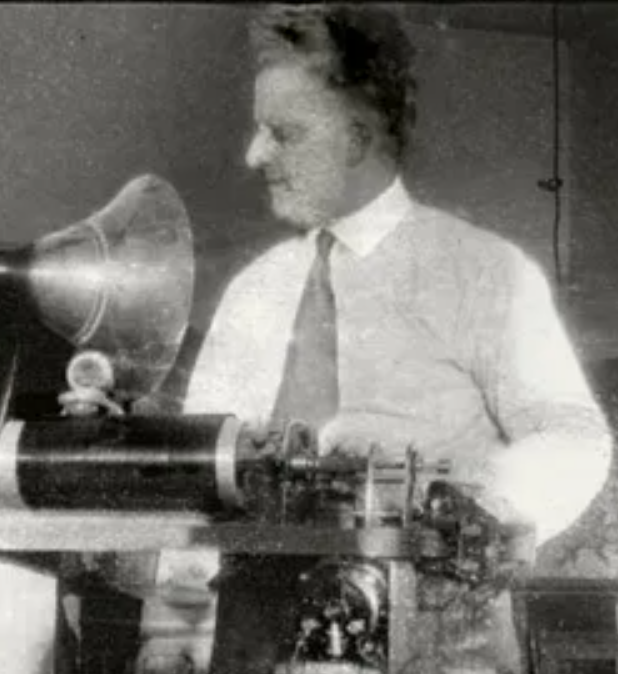
- Born: August 6, 1881; Peoria, Peoria County, Illinois
- Died: September 7, 1938 (aged 57); Wilmette, Cook County, Illinois
- Resting place: Oakwood Cemetery; Joliet, Will County, Illinois, USA
- Occupation(s): Engineer and inventor
- Known for: Pioneering electrical recording
- Spouse: Erma Amber Mills (m. 1905–1934)

Orlando R. Marsh (August 6, 1881 – September 7, 1938) was an electrical engineer raised in Wilmette, Illinois. In early 1920s Chicago, Illinois he pioneered electrical recording of phonograph discs with microphones when acoustic recording with horns was commonplace. His firm Marsh Laboratories, Inc., founded in 1922, at one time was located on the seventh floor of the Lyon & Healy Building near the corner of Wabash and Jackson in Chicago. The Marsh firm no longer exists but the building still stands and is part of DePaul University.(1)

It was reported in Time Magazine on April 28, 1923 that a device invented by Orlando R. Marsh was successfully used to make a recording of organ music, hitherto considered impossible. The article stated that Pietro A. Yon from New York City played his organ composition "Jesu Bambino" in Marsh's Chicago laboratory and that the reproduction was described as excellent. The article went on to say that this accomplishment appeared to open a new area for the phonograph.

Marsh's best known recordings were duets by King Oliver and Jelly Roll Morton on the Autograph Records 78 rpm phonograph disc label. His best selling Autograph records were those of Jesse Crawford in 1924 playing the Wurlitzer pipe organ in the Chicago Theatre using his then-new electrical disc recording system. This was before Victor Talking Machine Company and Columbia Records started to use the Western Electric licensed method of electrically recording records using microphones in 1925.

Orlando Marsh also participated in the first radio program syndication employing disc records. Freeman Gosden and Charles Correll electrically recorded their WMAQ (AM) Amos 'n' Andy radio program at Marsh Laboratories prior to live airing during the 1928 - 1929 period.(3)

Occasionally, specialty recordings by Marsh Laboratories from the late 1920s to the early 1940s are found.

== See also ==
- Victor Orthophonic Victrola

== Bibliography ==
- (1) Powell, James R., Jr., Randall G. Stehle, and Jonathan D. Powell. Vintage microphones and the restoration of early Marsh Laboratories electrical 78-rpm recordings. ARSC Journal 2006; 37 (1): 36-47.
- (2) Rust, Brian. Autograph, a glimpse into the past. Storyville 1972: 40:124-126.
- (3) McLeod, Elizabeth. A & A Recordings; email to old.time.radio@oldradio.net; December 27, 2002.
