= Jesse Crawford =

American pianist and organist (1895–1962)

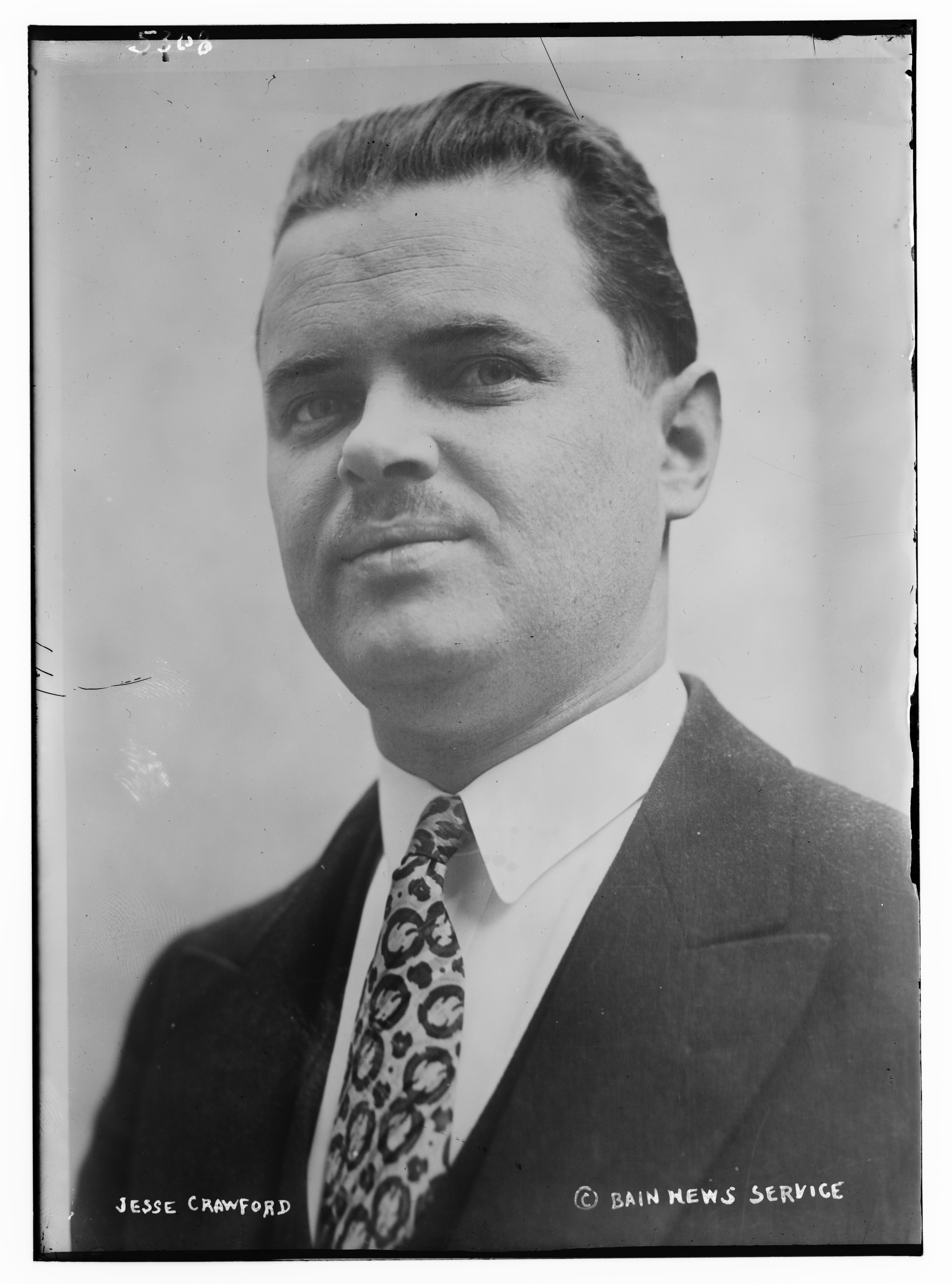
- Crawford at a Wurlitzer theatre pipe organ (pre-1930)

Background information
- Born: December 2, 1895; Woodland, California, U.S.
- Died: May 28, 1962 (aged 66) Los Angeles, California, U.S.
- Occupation: Instrumentalist
- Instruments: Piano; organ
- Years active: 1909–1962

Jesse Crawford (December 2, 1895 – May 28, 1962) was an American pianist and organist. He was well known in the 1920s as a theatre organist for silent films and as a popular recording artist. In the 1930s, he switched to the Hammond organ and became a freelancer. In the 1940s, he authored instruction books on organ and taught organ lessons.

== Early life ==
He was born in Woodland, California. Crawford's father died when Jesse was one year old and left an impoverished wife and mother, who placed the baby in an orphanage asylum near Woodland in which Jesse taught himself music. At the age of nine, he was already playing a cornet in the orphanage band. At age 14, he left the orphanage to play piano in a small dance band, and then took a job playing piano in a ten-cent-admission silent film house.

His early theatre organ experience was at the Gem Theater in Spokane, Washington in 1911 and at the Clemmer-owned Casino Theatre (on an eight-rank Estey organ). He next played briefly at theatres in Billings, Montana, Spokane, and Seattle. When he met Oliver Wallace, Crawford learned about the new types of theatre organ sounds. Crawford's next jobs were playing at the Strand in San Francisco and the Mission Theatre in Los Angeles.

== 1920s: silent movie organist ==
In the 1920s, Crawford began forming a fan base and was dubbed the "Poet of the Organ" for his style of playing ballads in Chicago. In 1921, he was employed by the Balaban and Katz theatre chain playing its 29-rank Wurlitzer in the Chicago Theatre. Likewise, Crawford was hired to play a large Wurlitzer organ in Grauman's Million Dollar Theatre, Los Angeles.

From 1926 to 1933, he performed at New York City's Paramount Theater, with his wife, Helen Anderson (also an organist), playing a twin organ console. They met in 1923, and married in 1924. Helen died in a car accident in 1943.

After some recordings for the small local Autograph Records label, Crawford made a series of gramophone records for the Victor Records label, which proved very popular with record buyers. He had hits such as "Rose Marie," "Valencia," and "Russian Lullaby." Other popular songs included "At Dawning" and "Roses of Picardy."

== 1930s: Hammond organist ==
With the end of the silent film era, work for theatre organists in movie houses dried up. Crawford played a Kilgen organ at Chicago's Century of Progress World's Fair in 1934, and in 1936, he got a job as staff organist in NBC Radio studios in Chicago.

In the 1930s, Crawford switched to the Hammond organ and began playing engagements across the United States. In addition to his numerous sound recordings, Crawford recorded player organ rolls on the Wurlitzer "R Rolls" system. His own compositions included "Vienna Violins," "Louisiana Nocturn," "Harlem Holiday," and "Hawaiian Honeymoon." Between 1937 and 1940, he appeared with his wife in several Vitaphone short films released by Warner Brothers.

== Teaching and instruction book author ==
In 1940, the self-taught Crawford undertook his first formal music study with Joseph Schillinger, whose other students included George Gershwin, Benny Goodman, and Glenn Miller and the movie score composers Leith Stevens and Nathan Van Cleave.

Crawford recorded Hammond organ LPs for Decca Records and worked and began writing and producing sheet music song arrangements for Hammond organ and instruction books. He also taught organ students, both in one-on-one lessons and in class style lessons, where he mostly lectured. Some of his students became quite well known and accomplished in their own right, probably the best example being Hal Pearl whose career stretched over 70 years. Hal became known as 'The King of the Organ.' Jesse recorded his last two LPs on the Simonton Wurlitzer organ.

== Death ==
Jesse Crawford died in Los Angeles, in May 1962, at the age of 66. He was buried at Glen Abbey Memorial Park.
