= Tops Records =

American record label

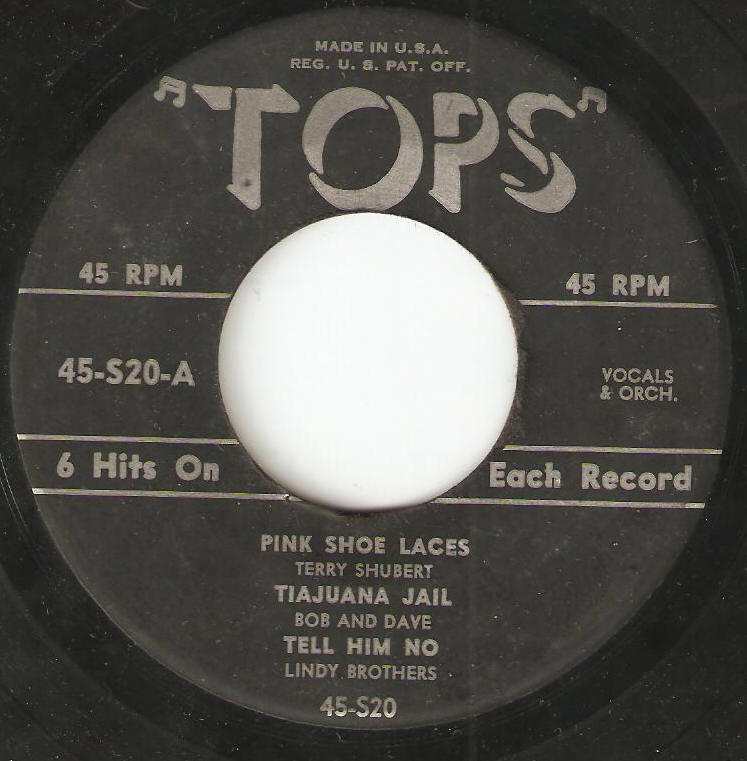
Tops 45rpm Extended-play record

Tops Records was a Los Angeles–based record label owned by Tops Music Enterprises, both founded in 1947 by Carl L. Doshay and Sam Dickerman. After a prolific and profitable run, Tops merged with PRI Records in 1958, which in turn, sold to a group of investors in 1960, then went bankrupt in about 1962. Its assets—which included a huge library of recordings—were sold to Pickwick Records, a label that had been its main competitor throughout the 1950s. Pickwick's assets were purchased by PolyGram Records in the late 1970s.

== Selected staff ==
- Carl L. Doshay (1917–2010), founder and president
- Sam Dickerman (1915–2000), founder and vice president
- Corky Carpenter (pseudonym of Amos Randolph Carpenter; 1922–1986), A&R
- Harold Spina, A&R
- Dave Pell, producer
