= There's Something on Your Mind =

Song by Big Jay McNeely
- B-side: "...Back...Shack...Track"
- Released: February 19, 1959
- Recorded: 1958
- Genre: R&B
- Length: 3:05
- Label: Swingin'
- Songwriter: Big Jay McNeely

"There's Something on Your Mind (Part 2)" is a song originally recorded as "There Is Something on Your Mind" in 1957 by Big Jay McNeely. The songwriting credit goes to Cecil James McNeely, which is Big Jay McNeely's birth name. It has been recorded many times since then by Big Jay McNeely himself with various collaborators.

== Background ==
Though McNeely is listed as the song's writer, he has freely admitted that he purchased it from the Rivingtons' vocalist John "Sonny" Harris, who in turn had lifted much of it from a gospel song, "Something on My Mind" by the Highway QCs. The lead vocalist on this original recording was Little Sonny Warner. The song was recorded along his band in a small Seattle recording studio, and leased more than a year later to Los Angeles disc jockey Hunter Hancock's Swingin' Records label.

== Chart performance ==
This first recording reached No. 42 on the Billboard Hot 100 and No. 5 on the R&B chart in early 1959.

== Cover version ==
In 1960, Bobby Marchan recorded the song as a single and it was Marchan's most successful release on both the R&B and pop singles chart, where it peaked at No. 1 on the R&B chart and No. 31 on the Billboard Hot 100.

== Other versions ==
Versions have been recorded by many other artists, including:

- Freddy Fender
- Rockin' Dopsie
- Little Johnny Taylor
- B.B. King, Albert King
- Etta James
- Conway Twitty
- Gene Vincent
- Baby Lloyd Stallworth (of the Famous Flames)
- The Jolly Jacks (who parodied the violence of the Marchan recording)
- Blue-eyed soul artist Baby Ray, whose recording peaked at No. 69 in Billboard (No. 92, Cashbox) in 1966
