= Art Tatum discography =

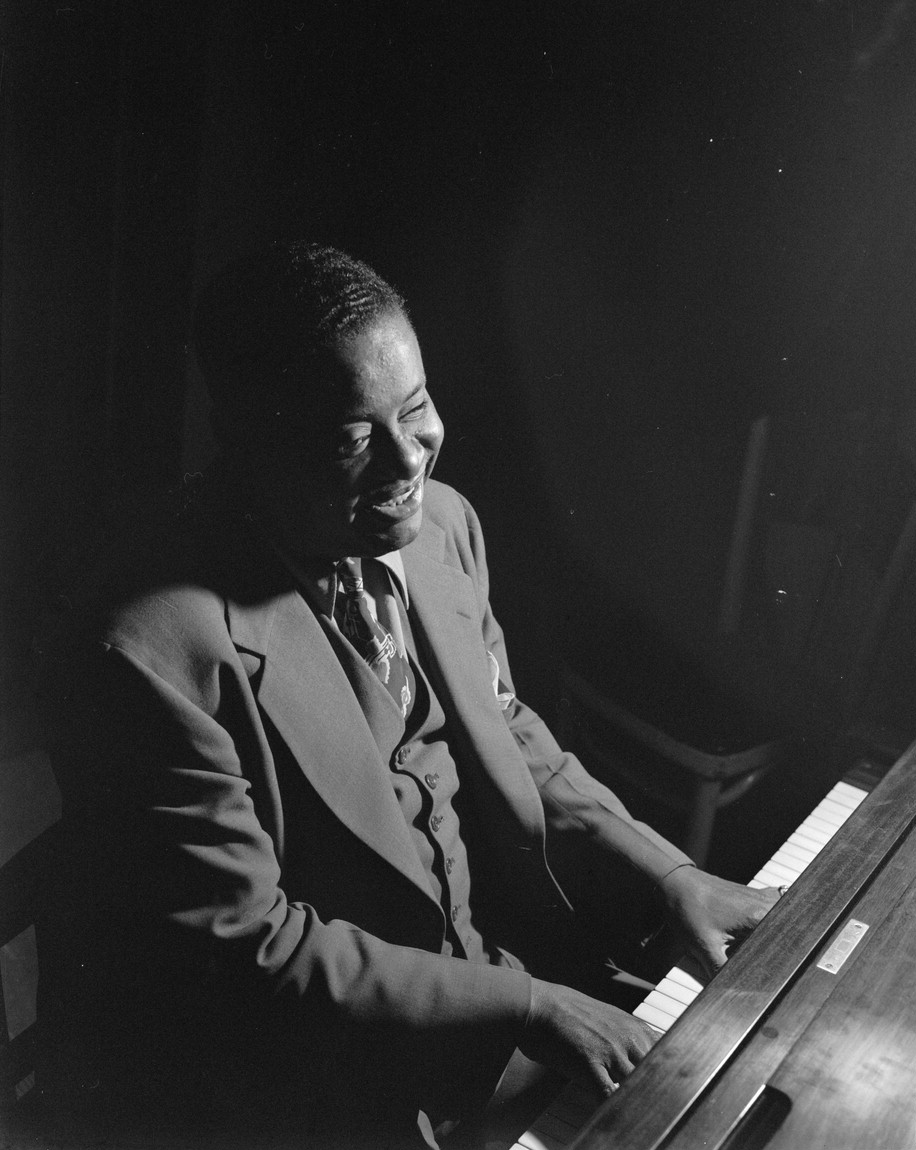
- Tatum in 1946; by William P. Gottlieb

Pianist Art Tatum (1909–1956) recorded commercially from 1932 until near his death. He recorded nearly 400 titles, if airchecks and informal, private recordings are included. He recorded for Brunswick (1933), Decca (1934–41), and Capitol (1949, 1952), and for the labels associated with Norman Granz (1953–56).

== Discography ==
- Piano Starts Here (Columbia, 1968) – 1933 studio recordings & 1949 Gene Norman concert listed below
- Classic Early Solos (1934–1937) (Decca/GRP, 1991)
- Solos (1940) (MCA, 1990)
- The Standard Sessions: 1935–1943 Transcriptions (Music & Arts, 1996)
- The Standard Transcriptions (Piano Solos, 1935 – c. 1945) (Storyville, 1999)
- I Got Rhythm Vol. 3 (1935–44) (Decca/GRP, 1993)
- Art Tatum Masterpieces (MCA, 1973)[2-LP] – from 1930s Decca recordings
- Art Tatum Masterpieces Volume II and James P. Johnson Plays Fats Waller (MCA, 1977) – from Decca recordings; shared album with James P. Johnson
- Standards (Black Lion, 1990) – rec. 1938–1939 as per The Standard Transcriptions
- Art of Tatum 1941–1944 (MCA, 1974) – with Big Joe Turner and trio
- God Is in the House (Onyx, 1973) – rec. 1940–1941; reissued by HighNote, 1998
- The V-Discs (Black Lion, 1978) – rec. 1944–46
- Art Tatum Piano Impressions, (ARA / Boris Morros Music Company, c. 1945)
- Art Tatum Piano Solos (Asch, c. 1945)
- Gene Norman Presents an Art Tatum Concert (Columbia, 1952) – rec. 1949
- Art Tatum (Capitol, 1950)
- Art Tatum Encores (Capitol, 1951)
- Footnotes to Jazz, Vol. 2: Jazz Rehearsal, II (Folkways, 1952)
- Art Tatum Trio (Capitol, 1953)
- Battle of Jazz, Volume 2 (Brunswick, 1953) – septet including Tatum and Big Joe Turner; shared album with Zutty Singleton
- The Genius of Art Tatum (Clef, 1953–54)[11-LP] – reissued as The Complete Pablo Solo Masterpieces (Pablo, 1991)[7-CD] and The Art Tatum Solo Masterpieces, Vol. 1–8 (Pablo, 1992)
- Makin' Whoopee (Verve, 1954)
- The Greatest Piano of Them All (Verve, 1954)
- Genius of Keyboard 1954–56 (Giants of Jazz, 1989)
- More of the Greatest Piano of Them All (Verve, 1955)
- Still More of the Greatest Piano Hits of Them All (Verve, 1955)
- Tatum–Carter–Bellson (Clef, 1955) – reissued as The Tatum Group Masterpieces, Volume One (Pablo, 1975)
- The Art Tatum–Roy Eldridge–Alvin Stoller–John Simmons Quartet (Clef, 1955) – reissued as The Tatum Group Masterpieces, Vol. 2 (Pablo, 1990)
- The Lionel Hampton Art Tatum Buddy Rich Trio (Clef, 1956) – reissued as The Tatum Group Masterpieces, Volume Three (Pablo, 1975)
- The Tatum Group Masterpieces, Vol. 4: With Hampton, Rich, Again (Pablo, 1990)
- The Tatum Group Masterpieces, Vol. 5: Tatum–Hampton–Edison–Rich–Callender–Kessel (Pablo, 1975 & 1990) – originally issued as Lionel Hampton and His Giants (Norgran, 1956) as by Hampton
- Presenting the Art Tatum Trio (Verve, 1957) – rec. 1956; reissued as The Tatum Group Masterpieces, Volume Six (Pablo, 1975)
- The Art Tatum–Buddy DeFranco Quartet (Verve, 1958) – rec. 1956; reissued as The Tatum Group Masterpieces, Volume Seven (Pablo, 1975)
- The Art Tatum–Ben Webster Quartet (Verve, 1958) – rec. 1956; reissued as The Tatum Group Masterpieces, Volume Eight (Pablo, 1975)
- Capitol Jazz Classics – Volume 3 Solo Piano (Capitol, 1972) – rec. 1949
- The Complete Capitol Recordings, Vol. 1 (Capitol, 1989)
- The Complete Capitol Recordings, Vol. 2 (Capitol, 1989)
- The Complete Capitol Recordings (Blue Note, 1997) – rec. 1949–52
- The Complete Pablo Group Masterpieces (Pablo, 1990)[6-CD] – containing the eight individual releases listed above
