= KGFJ =

KGFJ may refer to:

- KGFJ (FM), a radio station (88.1 FM) licensed to serve Belt, Montana, United States
- KYPA, a radio station (1230 AM) licensed to serve Los Angeles, California, United States, which held the call sign KGFJ from 1926 to 1996
