= Swingin' Records =

- Founded: 1959
- Founder: Hunter Hancock, Roger Davenport
- Distributor(s): Allied Record Distributing Company (ARDCO)
- Genre: R&B,
- Country of origin: United States
- Location: Hollywood, California

Swingin' Records was a Hollywood based record label that released recordings by artists such as Big Jay McNeely, Rochell & the Candles and The Hollywood Saxons.

== Background ==
The label was formed in 1959 by Roger Davenport and Hunter Hancock. Its first release was "There Is Something on Your Mind" which was a hit for sax player, Big Jay McNeely. The catalogue also included releases by Marvin & Johnny, Rochell & the Candles and the Hollywood Saxons. It was located at 1554 N. Gower Hollywood, CA.

In the mid 1960s, Davenport would later run Consolidated International Record Co. with Al Stewart.

== History ==
It was reported in the May 25, 1959 issue of The Billboard that Swingin' was one of the 15 new labels that started up in the last week.

== Discography ==
Compilations featuring recordings from the Swingin' Records catalogue
Act	Title	Catalogue	Year	Notes #
Various artists	The Best Of Swingin Records	Relic Records 5060		LP; The Golden Groups Series Volume 36
Various artists	The Golden Era of Doo-Wops: Swingin' Records	Relic Record Productions 7140	2018	CD
