= Johnny & the Expressions =

American R&B group (1960s)

- Genre: R&B
- Years active: 1960s
- Label: Josie
- Past members: Johnny Matthews (frontman)

Johnny & the Expressions was an American R&B group fronted by Johnnie Matthews. They had a hit in 1966 with "Something I Want to Tell You".

== Background ==
Some sources state that the lead singer was Johnny Wyatt, who previously was with Rochell & the Candles. Others say it's Johnny Matthews. They recorded for the Josie label.

== Career ==
In 1965, the group released "Something I Want to Tell You", composed by Ralph Meeks, on Josie Records. The B side, "Where Is the Party", was composed by Johnny Matthews. In its October 30 issue, Billboard reported that "Something I Want to Tell You" was a top DJ pick in San Francisco and Baltimore. For the week ending February 5, 1966, the single was in the Top Sellers on the Top Markets chart, 22 in New York, 19 in Philadelphia, and 19 in Pittsburgh. It peaked on the Hot 100 at No. 79 on December 2, 1966. It also peaked at No. 14 on the R&B charts.

== Later years ==
The group was founded by Johnny Matthews, who died on August 25, 2022, after a battle with illness. He was 83 years old.

== Discography ==
Act	Title	Catalogue	Year	Ref.
Johnny & the Expressions	"Something I Want to Tell You" / "Where Is the Party"	Josie 45-946	1965	
Johnny & the Expressions	"Now that You're Mine" / "Shy Girl"	Josie 45-955	1966	
Johnny & the Expressions	"Boys and Girls Together" / "Give Me One More Chance"	Josie 45-959	1966	
Johnny & the Expressions / J. Frank Wilson and the Cavaliers	"Something I Want to Tell You" / "Last Kiss"	Virgo VO 6001	1972	
The Delfonics / Johnny & the Expressions	"He Don't Really Love You" / "Something I Want to Tell You"	Collectables COL 0309		
