= Tatum (music) =

Subdivision of a beat in music information retrieval

A tatum is a feature of music that has been variously defined as: "the smallest time interval between successive notes in a rhythmic phrase", "the shortest durational value [...] in music that [is] still more than incidentally encountered", "the smallest cognitively meaningful subdivision of the main beat", and "the fastest pulse present in a piece of music". "In Western notation, tatums may correspond typically to sixteenth- or twenty-fourth-notes", or thirty-second notes.

More technically, a tatum is the "lowest regular pulse train that a listener intuitively infers from the timing of perceived musical events: a time quantum. It is roughly equivalent to the time division that most highly coincides with note onsets". The tatum allows a musician's deviation from an ensemble's tempo (which may be implied or explicitly played) to be quantified: mathematically, "a deviation function determines the amount of time that an event metrically falling on a particular tatum should be shifted when performed".

The existence of the tatum allowed human perception of music to be more closely modelled by algorithms. This was important in the development of software for Echo Nest, which underlies several music streaming services.

The term was coined by Jeff Bilmes in an MIT Master's thesis, Timing Is of the Essence, published in 1993, and is named after the influential jazz pianist Art Tatum, "whose tatum was faster than all others".
