= Something I Want to Tell You =

Song by Johnny & the Expressions
- Released: 1965
- Genre: R&B
- Length: 2:45
- Label: Josie Records
- Composer: Ralph Meeks
- Producer: Ben Boyce

"Something I Want to Tell You" was a 1966 hit single for R&B group Johnny & the Expressions.

== Background ==
In 1965, "Something I Want to Tell You" was released on the Josie Records 45–946. The A side was composed by Ralph Meeks. The B side "Where Is The Party" was composed by Johnny Matthews.

=== Chart performance ===
In its October 30 issue, Billboard reported that "Something I Want to Tell You" was a top DJ pick in San Francisco and Baltimore. For the week ending February 5, 1966, the single was in the Top Sellers in Top Markets chart. The positions were 22 in New York, 19 in Philadelphia and 19 in Pittsburgh. The single peaked in the Hot 100 at No. 79 on February 12, 1966. It also peaked at No. 14 on the R&B chart.
