= Once Upon a Time (Rochell & the Candles song) =

Single by Rochell & the Candles
- B-side: "When My Baby Is Gone"
- Released: 1960
- Recorded: 1960
- Genre: Doo-wop
- Length: 2:54
- Label: Swingin' 45-623
- Composer(s): Wyatt, Henderson

Once Upon a Time was a hit in 1961 for Rochell & the Candles.

It made it to number 20 in the R&B charts and number 26 in the pop charts. It spent a total of thirteen weeks in the pop charts.

It appears on the 16 All Time Great Rare Original Oldies various artists compilation issued on Del-Fi Records.
