= Little Sonny Warner =

- Born: Haywood S. Warner; October 30, 1930; Falls Church, Virginia
- Died: April 12, 2007 (aged 76); Falls Church, Virginia

Little Sonny Warner (October 30, 1930 – April 12, 2007) was an American blues singer.

Haywood S. Warner was born in 1930 in Falls Church, Virginia, United States, and in the early 1950s, Warner sang as a backing vocalist for Van Walls on the Atlantic Records releases "After Midnight" and "Open the Door". His career received a boost in 1957, when he filled in for Lloyd Price at the Apollo Theatre in Harlem.

Warner's biggest hit was saxophonist Big Jay McNeely's "'There's Something on Your Mind", which became a gold record for Checker Records in 1959. He performed with James Brown, Etta James and B.B. King. In his later years, Warner often performed at concerts and festivals in Falls Church.

He died in his hometown in April 2007, at the age of 76.
