= Art Tatum =

American jazz pianist (1909–1956)

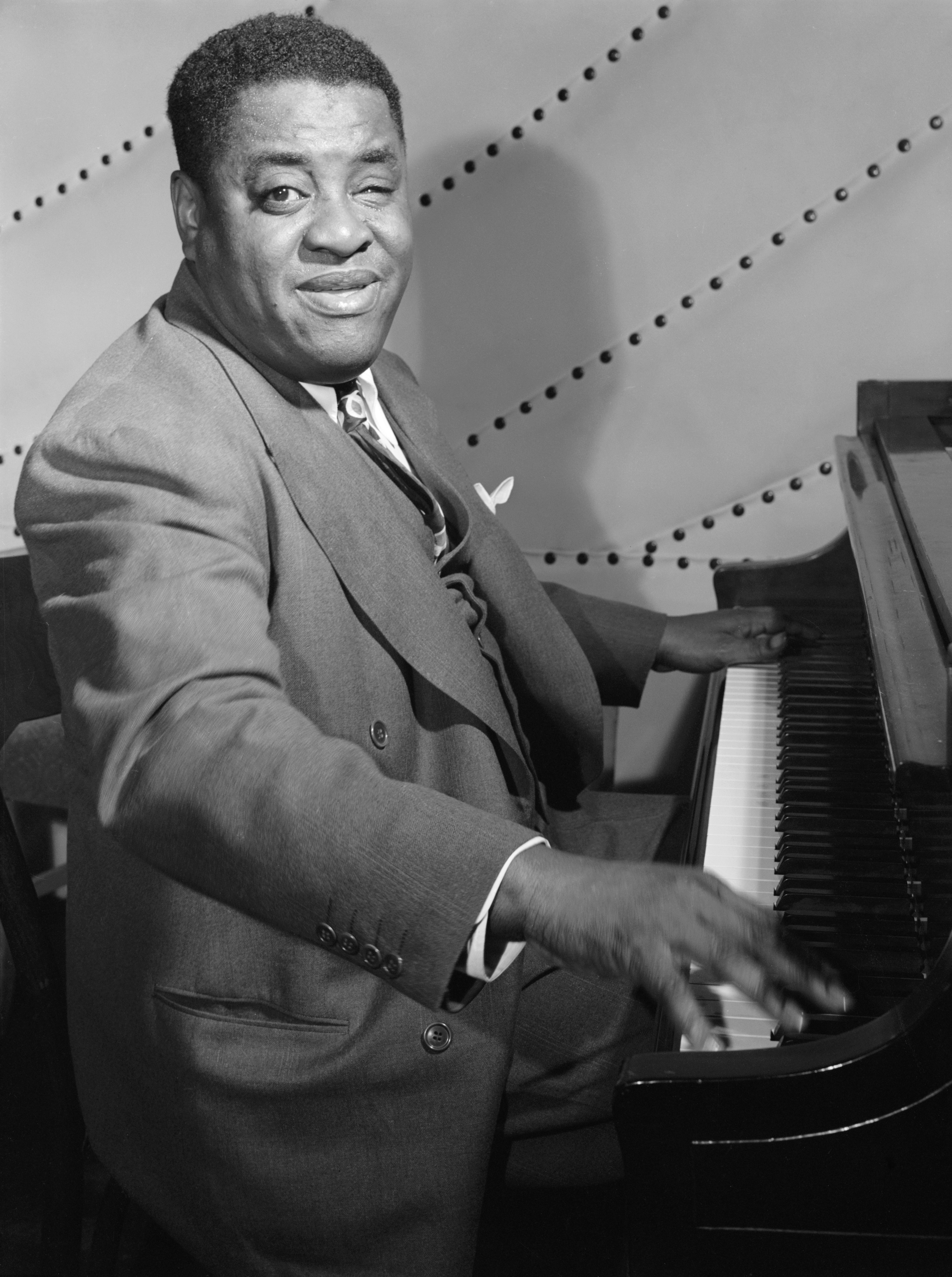
- Tatum in 1946–1948; by William P. Gottlieb
- Born: Arthur Tatum Jr. October 13, 1909; Toledo, Ohio, U.S.
- Died: November 5, 1956 (aged 47); Los Angeles, California, U.S.
- Burial place: Forest Lawn Memorial Park
- Occupation: Musician
- Years active: Mid-1920s–1956
- Notable work: Discography
- Spouse: Ruby Arnold (m. 1935; div. 1955) Geraldine Williamson (m. 1955)
- Partner: Marnette Jackson
- Children: 1
- Musical career
- Genres: Jazz; stride
- Instrument: Piano
- Labels: Brunswick; Decca; Capitol; Clef; Verve

Arthur Tatum Jr. (/ˈteɪ.təm/ TAY-təm; October 13, 1909 – November 5, 1956) was an American jazz pianist who is widely regarded as one of the greatest ever. From early in his career, fellow musicians acclaimed Tatum's technical ability as extraordinary. Tatum also extended jazz piano's vocabulary and boundaries far beyond his initial stride influences and established new ground through innovative use of reharmonization, voicing, and bitonality.

Tatum grew up in Toledo, Ohio, where he began playing piano professionally and had his own radio program, rebroadcast nationwide, while still in his teens. He left Toledo in 1932 and had residencies as a solo pianist at clubs in major urban centers including New York, Chicago, and Los Angeles. In that decade, he settled into a pattern he followed for most of his career – paid performances followed by long after-hours playing, all accompanied by prodigious alcohol consumption. He was said to be more spontaneous and creative in such venues, and although the drinking did not hinder his playing, it did damage his health.

In the 1940s, Tatum led a commercially successful trio for a short time and began playing in more formal jazz concert settings, including at Norman Granz–produced Jazz at the Philharmonic events. His popularity diminished towards the end of the decade, as he continued to play in his own style, ignoring the rise of bebop. Granz recorded Tatum extensively in solo and small group formats in the mid-1950s, with the last session only two months before Tatum's death from uremia at the age of 47.

== Early life ==
Tatum's mother, Mildred Hoskins, was born in Martinsville, Virginia, around 1890, and was a domestic worker. His father, Arthur Tatum Sr., was born in Statesville, North Carolina, (Note: Tatum Sr.'s age at the time of Tatum Jr.'s birth is given as either 24 or 28, meaning he was born around 1885 or around 1881.) and had steady employment as a mechanic. In 1909, they made their way from North Carolina to begin a new life in Toledo, Ohio. The couple had four children: Art, the oldest surviving child, was born in Toledo on October 13, 1909; his sister, Arline, was born nine years later; followed by his brother, Karl, two years after that. Karl went to college and became a social worker. The Tatum family was regarded as conventional and church-going.

From infancy, Tatum had impaired vision. Several explanations for this have been posited, most involving cataracts. (Note: Tatum's eyesight is discussed in detail by Spencer 2002, pp. 42–54.) As a result of eye operations, by the age of 11, Tatum could see objects close to him and perhaps distinguish colors. Any benefits from these procedures were reversed, however, when he was assaulted, probably in his early twenties. The attack left him completely blind in his left eye and with very limited vision in his right. Despite this, there are multiple accounts of him enjoying playing cards and pool. (Note: In 1935, Tatum was reported as describing his eyesight as "not too good, but I can see enough to read and write and get around".)

Accounts vary on whether Tatum's parents played any musical instruments, but it is likely that he was exposed at an early age to church music, including through the Grace Presbyterian Church that his parents attended. He also began the piano at a young age, playing by ear and aided by an excellent memory and sense of pitch. Other musicians reported that he had perfect pitch. As a child, he was sensitive to the piano's intonation and insisted it be tuned often. He learned tunes from the radio and records and by copying piano roll recordings. In an interview as an adult, Tatum denied the story that his playing ability developed because he had attempted to reproduce piano roll recordings that, without his knowing, had been made by two performers. His interest in sports was lifelong, and he displayed an encyclopedic memory for baseball statistics.

Tatum first attended Jefferson School in Toledo, then moved to the School for the Blind in Columbus, Ohio, late in 1924. After less than a year, he transferred to the Toledo School of Music. Overton G. Rainey, who gave him formal piano lessons in the classical tradition for six years beginning at the age of 12, at either the Jefferson School or the Toledo School of Music, was also visually impaired, did not improvise, and discouraged his students from playing jazz. Based on this history, it is reasonable to assume that Tatum was largely self-taught as a pianist. By the time he was a teenager, Tatum was asked to play at various social events, and he was probably being paid to play in Toledo clubs from around 1924–25.

Major influences on Tatum

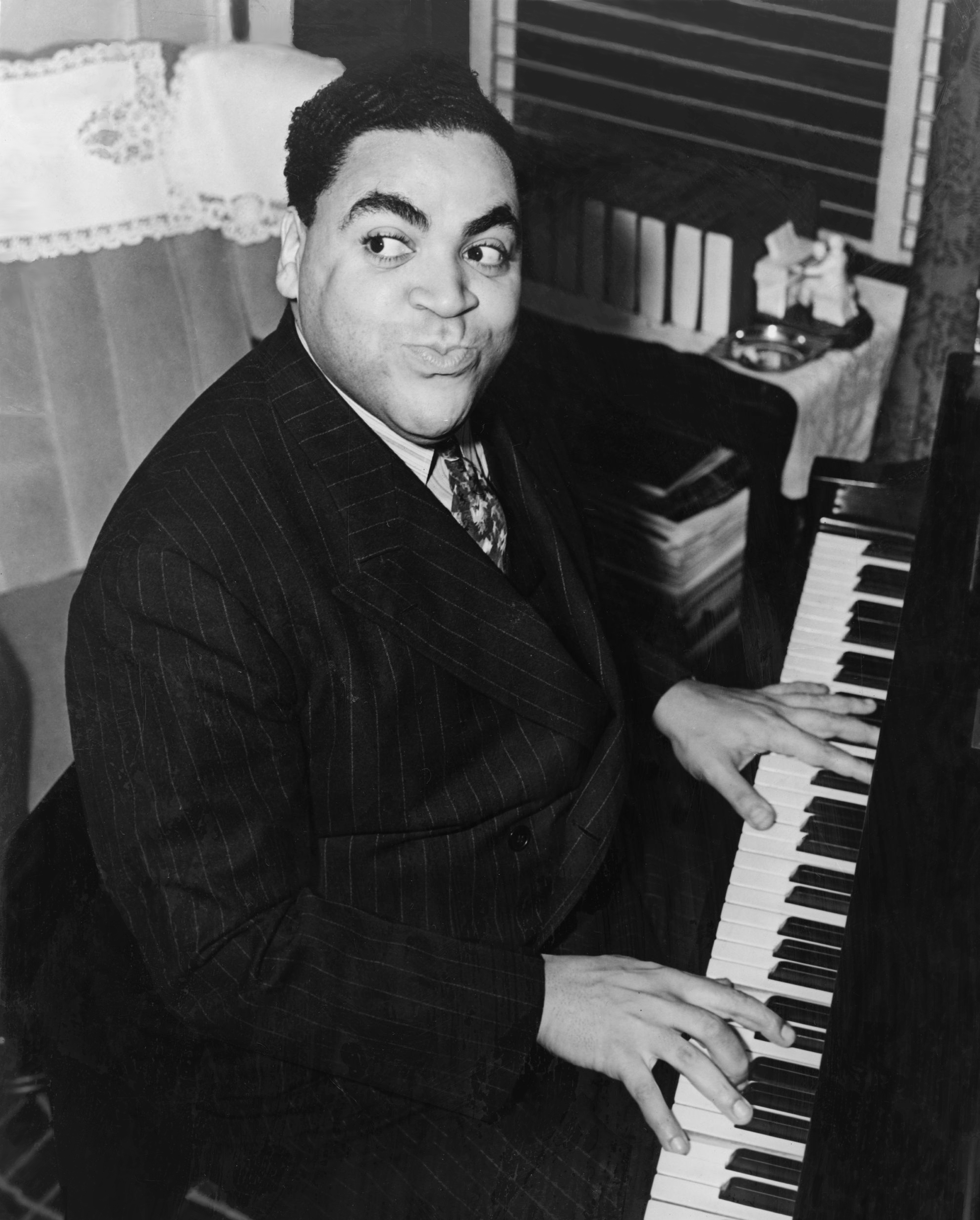
Fats Waller

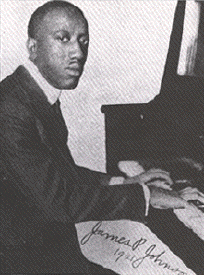
James P. Johnson

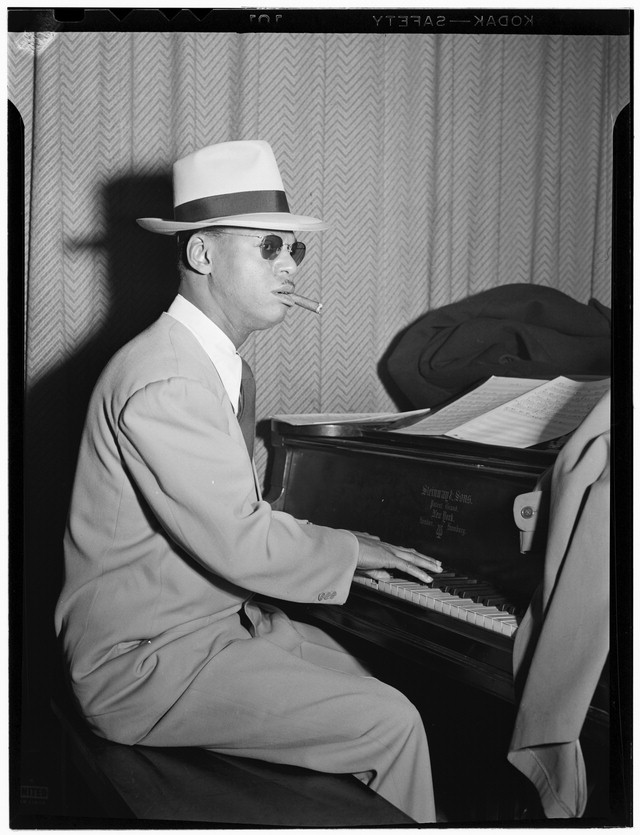
Earl Hines

Growing up, Tatum drew inspiration principally from Fats Waller and James P. Johnson, who exemplified the stride piano style, and to some extent from the more modern Earl Hines, six years Tatum's senior. Tatum identified Waller as his biggest influence, while pianist Teddy Wilson and saxophonist Eddie Barefield suggested that Hines was one of his favorite jazz pianists. Wilson declared that Tatum was "the strongest influence of all" on his own playing and that "Art Tatum was the master of all of us and we were all awestruck when he sat down to play the most phenomenal playing." Another influence on Tatum was pianist Lee Sims, who did not play jazz, but used chord voicings and an orchestral approach – that is, one that encompassed a full, rich sound instead of highlighting one or more timbres.

== Career and adult life ==
=== 1927–1937 ===
In 1927, after winning an amateur competition, Tatum began playing on the Toledo radio station WSPD during interludes in a morning shopping program, and he soon had his own daily program. After regular club dates, he often visited after-hours clubs to be with other musicians; he enjoyed listening to other pianists and preferred to play after all the others had finished. He frequently played for hours on end into the dawn; his radio show was scheduled for noon, allowing him time to rest before evening performances. During 1928–29, the radio program was rebroadcast nationwide by the Blue Network. According to the jazz vocalist Jon Hendricks, a neighbor of the Tatums, around 1930 the player piano at Tatum's house was replaced by a better instrument: "Art Tatum's mother scrubbed floors at the First National Bank to help him get a second-hand baby grand." Tatum also began to play in larger Midwestern cities outside his home town, including Cleveland, Columbus, and Detroit.

As word of Tatum spread, national performers passing through Toledo, including Duke Ellington and Fletcher Henderson, visited clubs where he was playing. They were impressed by what they heard: from near the start of his career, "his accomplishment [...] was of a different order from what most people, from what even musicians, had ever heard. It made musicians reconsider their definitions of excellence, of what was possible", his biographer reported. Although Tatum was encouraged by comments from these and other established musicians, he felt that he was not yet, in the late 1920s, musically ready to move to New York City, the center of the jazz world and home to many of the pianists he had listened to growing up.

Around 1930, Tatum joined Milton Senior and his Chateau La France Orchestra, a highly regarded four piece band in Toledo, consisting of piano, bass, guitar, and clarinet. In 1932, vocalist Adelaide Hall, touring the United States with two pianists, heard Tatum play in Toledo and recruited him. She was introduced to Tatum by Ella P. Stewart, the wife of William W. Stewart, with whom Tatum entered a management contract. Stewart was a local pharmacist who had connections in the music business but not enough to properly represent Tatum, who two years later went under contract to a professional manager in Chicago named Sam Beers.

Upon joining with Hall, Tatum traveled to New York as part of her band. In July 1932, Tatum nearly lost his job with Hall while performing at New York's Palace Theatre. During a costume change, Tatum strayed from the rehearsed routine and delivered a brilliant solo that received deafening applause from the audience. Although Hall threatened to fire him for upstaging her, Tatum later agreed with her decision, recognizing that it was ultimately her show.

That same summer, the legendary John Henry Hammond became a disc jockey at New York radio station WEVD. After listeners responded positively to his favorite records, Hammond started a live Saturday night jazz jam session financed out of his own pocket, attracting top talent including Tatum, Fletcher Henderson, and Benny Carter. On August 5 that year, Hall and her band recorded two sides ("I'll Never Be the Same" and "Strange as It Seems") which were Tatum's first studio recordings. Two more sides with Hall followed five days later, as did a solo piano test-pressing of "Tea for Two" that was not released for several decades.

Tatum recorded his first four released solo sides, for Brunswick Records, in March 1933: "St. Louis Blues", "Sophisticated Lady", "Tea for Two", and "Tiger Rag". The last of these was a minor hit, impressing the public with its startling tempo of approximately 376 (quarter note) beats per minute, and with right-hand eighth notes adding to the technical feat.

After his arrival in New York, Tatum participated in a cutting contest at Morgan's bar in Harlem with the established stride piano masters – Johnson, Waller, and Willie "the Lion" Smith. Standard contest pieces included Johnson's "Harlem Strut" and "Carolina Shout" and Waller's "Handful of Keys". Tatum played his own arrangements of "Tea for Two" and "Tiger Rag". Reminiscing about Tatum's debut, Johnson said, "When Tatum played 'Tea for Two' that night I guess that was the first time I ever heard it really played." Tatum thus became the preeminent jazz pianist. He and Waller became good friends, with similar lifestyles: both drank excessively and lived as lavishly as their incomes permitted.

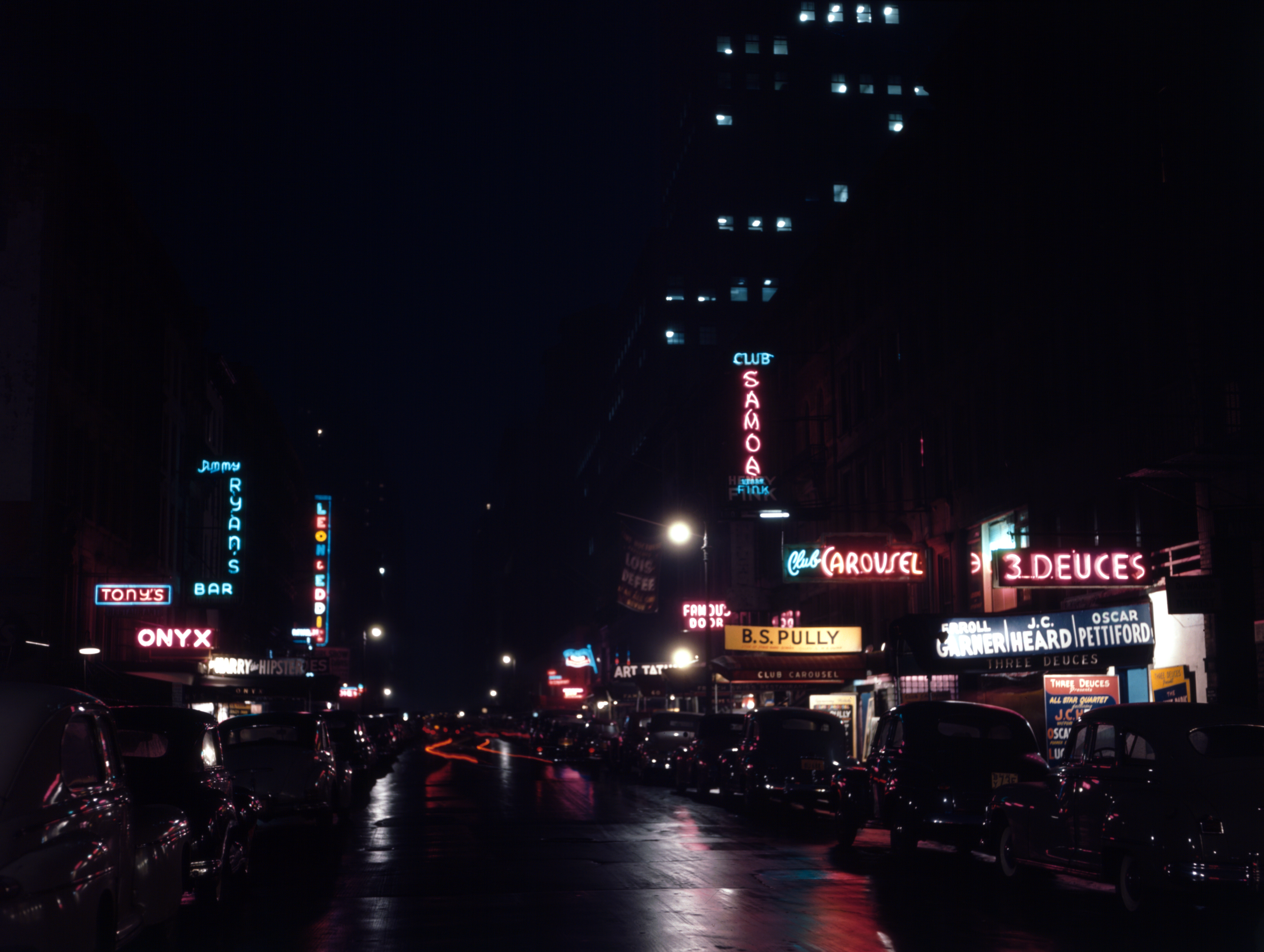
Clubs on 52nd Street in New York, where Tatum often played (May 1948)

Tatum's first solo piano job in New York was at the Onyx Club, which was later reported to have paid him "$45 a week and free whiskey". The Onyx was one of the first jazz clubs to open on 52nd Street, which became the city's focal point for public jazz performance for more than a decade.

Tatum's only known child, Orlando, was born in 1933, when Tatum was 24. The mother was Marnette Jackson, a waitress in Toledo; the pair were not married. It is likely that neither parent had a major role in raising their son, who pursued a military career and died in the 1980s. In June 1947, Variety reported that Jackson sued Tatum for $3,735 plus interest for support of their son.

During the hard economic times of 1934 and 1935, Tatum mostly played in clubs in Cleveland, but also recorded in New York four times in 1934 and once in 1935. He also performed on national radio, including for the Fleischman Hour broadcast hosted by Rudy Vallée in 1935. In August of that year, he married Ruby Arnold, who was from Cleveland. The next month, he began a residence of about a year at the Three Deuces in Chicago, initially as a soloist and then in a quartet with alto saxophone, guitar, and drums.

In New York, Tatum encountered a 13-year-old Hazel Scott, who was a musical child prodigy and classical piano student at Juilliard. She later became a popular sensation by pioneering her signature style of "swinging the classics" and breaking barriers as the first Black woman to host her own national network television show. Tatum and Fats Waller became close with Hazel and her family and introduced her to stride piano. Recognizing her exceptional technical facility, Tatum mentored the young pianist in rapid hand speed, dexterity, and contrapuntal movement. He actively encouraged her to shift her focus toward popular music, advising her to study the blues to add structure and deeper emotional texture to her interpretations. Consequently, biographer Karen Chilton noted that Scott's subsequent recordings beginning in 1939 clearly reflect a distinctive, Tatum-inspired swing style. Tatum would later mentor the pianist Dorothy Donegan, who also crossed over from classical to jazz and was known for her flamboyant style. Tatum reportedly called her "the only woman who can make me practice."

At the end of his first Three Deuces stint, Tatum moved to California, traveling by train because of his fear of flying. There, he continued a routine that characterized the greater part of his career: performing paid gigs followed by informal late night sessions, all accompanied by heavy drinking. A friend from his early days in California observed that Tatum drank Pabst Blue Ribbon beer by the case. This lifestyle contributed to the effects of the diabetes that Tatum probably developed as an adult, but, as highlighted by his biographer, James Lester, Tatum would have faced a conflict if he wanted to address his diabetes: "concessions – drastically less beer, a controlled diet, more rest – would have taken away exactly the things that mattered most to him, and would have removed him from the night-life that he seemed to love more than almost anything (afternoon baseball or football games would probably come next)".

Tatum performed on various radio programs in 1935–36, including the Paul Whiteman Music Hall, the NBC Carnival, and the Sinclair Greater Minstrels.

In California, Tatum also played "numerous parties for members of the [Hollywood] movie colony", including Oscar Levant, George Gershwin, and Mary Pickford, and appeared on Bing Crosby's radio program late in 1936. He recorded in Los Angeles for the first time early the following year – four tracks as the sextet named Art Tatum and His Swingsters, for Decca Records. During that period, Tatum met the 25-year-old tenor saxophonist Don Byas, who bridged the swing and bebop eras of jazz. Byas credited Tatum as a major influence on his playing and recalled receiving the following advice: (Note: Advice often attributed to Miles Davis, but in fact offered by Tatum years earlier.) "Don, don't ever worry about what you're going to play or where the ideas are going to come from. Just remember there is no such thing as a wrong note. What makes a note wrong is when you don't know where to go after that one. As long as you know how to get to the next note, there's no such thing as a wrong note. You hit any note you want and it fits in any chord."

Continuing to travel by train, Tatum settled into a pattern of performances at major jazz clubs in Los Angeles, Chicago, and New York, interspersed with appearances at minor clubs where musicians of his standing did not normally play. Thus, in 1937, he left Los Angeles for another residence at the Three Deuces in Chicago and then went on to the Famous Door club in New York, where he opened for Louis Prima. Tatum recorded for Brunswick again near the end of that year.

=== 1938–1949 ===
In March 1938, Tatum and his wife embarked on the Queen Mary for England. He performed there for three months and enjoyed the quiet listeners who, unlike some American audiences, did not talk over his playing. While in England, he appeared twice on the BBC Television program Starlight. Four of his very limited number of compositions were also published in Britain. He then returned to the Three Deuces. The overseas trip appeared to have boosted his reputation, particularly with the white public, and he was able to have club residencies of at least several weeks at a time in New York over the following few years, sometimes with stipulations that no food or drink be served while he was playing.

In the late 1930s, Jack Robbins of the Robbins Music Corporation announced that Tatum had signed a contract to produce a series of original compositions and folios. Although Tatum did not transcribe or compose the music himself, his improvisational approach and harmonic re-organizations of the source material were distinct enough to be considered unique compositions. Robbins published the first issue of Art Tatum Improvisations in January 1939 and a second volume containing 13 additional transcriptions in 1946. Both collections were transcribed by Morris Feldman. According to discographers Arnold Laubich and Ray Spencer, the second volume of sheet music transcriptions were taken from acetate discs that have since been lost. Consequently, 16 of the 27 tunes transcribed by Feldman do not survive as audio recordings today. Considering that Tatum recorded approximately 240 unique song titles across his lifetime – out of nearly 400 total tracks including duplications – this gap highlights both the extent of his repertoire and scope of his memory.

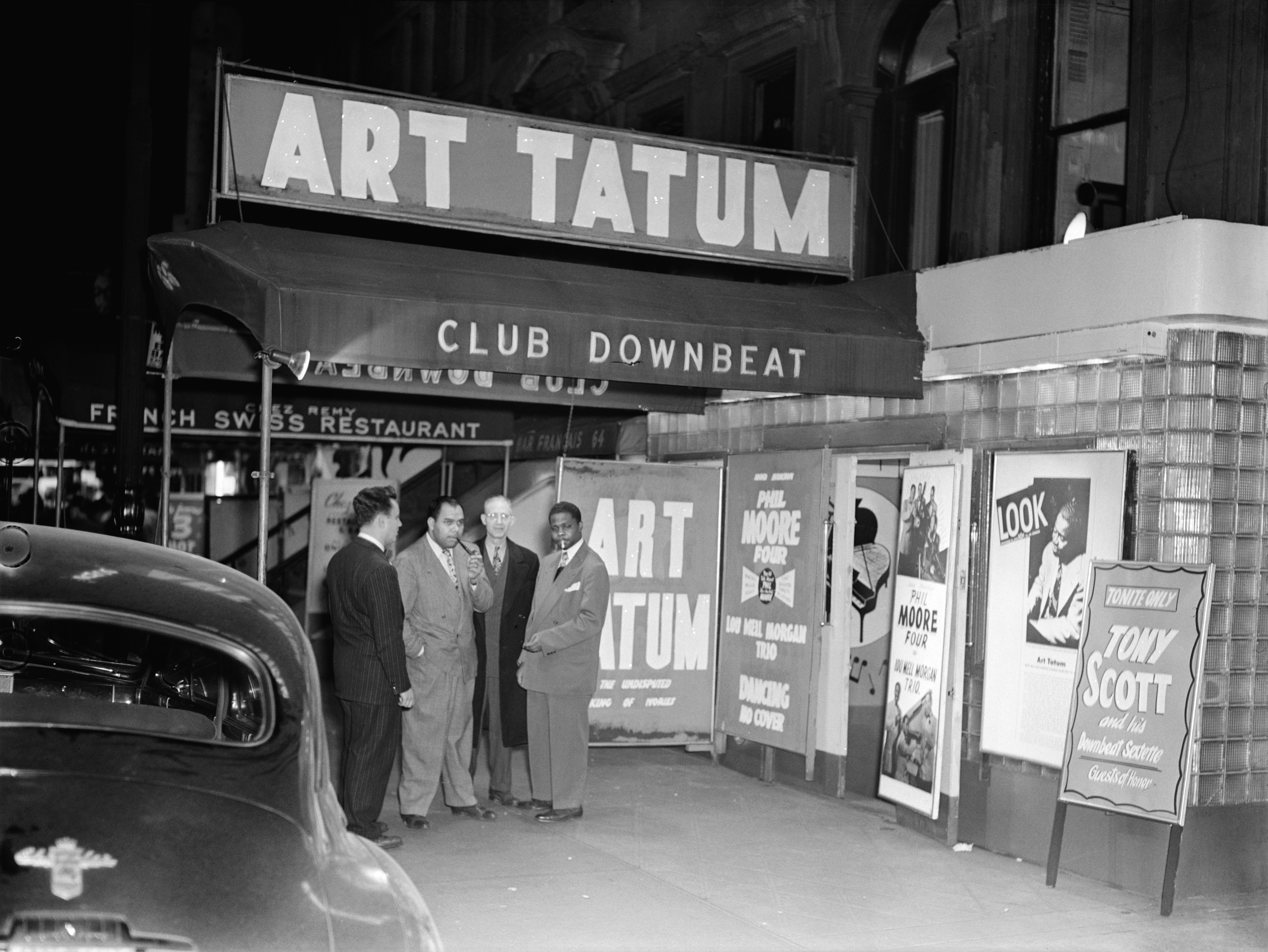
Tatum (right) and Phil Moore (center left) at the Downbeat Club, New York, c. 1947

Tatum recorded 16 sides in August 1938, but they were not released for at least a decade. A similar situation occurred the following year: of the 18 sides he recorded, only two were issued as 78s. This outcome suggests that the 16 unissued tracks may be identical to the lost acetate recordings referenced above, indicating a potential chronological error in historical accounts.

A possible explanation for the tracks not being issued was the increasing popularity of big band music and vocalists limiting the demand for solo recordings. (Although Tatum's career coincided with the swing era, he operated outside the commercial mainstream and never played in the dominant big bands, such as the groups led by Count Basie, Benny Goodman, Tommy Dorsey, and Glenn Miller. Tatum remained a soloist and small-group performer.) One of the releases, a version of "Tea for Two", was added to the Grammy Hall of Fame in 1986. One recording from early in 1941, however, was commercially successful, with sales of perhaps 500,000. This was "Wee Baby Blues", performed by a sextet and with the addition of Big Joe Turner on vocals. Informal performances of Tatum's playing in 1940 and 1941 were released decades later on the album God Is in the House, for which he was posthumously awarded the 1973 Grammy for Best Jazz Performance by a Soloist. The album title came from Waller's reaction upon seeing Tatum enter the club where Waller was performing: "I only play the piano, but tonight God is in the house."

Around October 1940, Tatum signed with the William Morris Agency, which began with a booking at the Café Society Downtown in New York City, and led to previously unheard-of heights commercially. Although Tatum had performed mostly in clubs and smaller after-hours joints in his early career, the Morris Agency in mid-decade sought to raise his profile and income by booking him in concert halls, a strategy that defied conventional practice for presenting jazz. In 1941, British critic Leonard Feather had opined in The New York Times that jazz and jazz musicians were better suited for informal nightclubs than for concert halls, a position he later recanted. It was the Morris Agency that brought the 17-piece Duke Ellington Orchestra to Carnegie Hall in New York in January 1943, one of the first jazz concerts in such a setting. Tatum's contact at the Morris Agency was Joe Marsolais. When Marsolais left the Morris Agency in 1946 to join Moe Gale, Tatum followed. Gale was a famous promoter of Black musical talent and the founder of the Savoy Ballroom in Harlem. Shortly thereafter, Marsolais left Gale and joined New York Frederick Bros., and again Tatum followed. In April 1947, Marsolais quit Frederick Bros. and opened his own office on Broadway in New York City. An advertisement announcing "Art Tatum 'Genius of Piano' represented by Joe Marsalois" appeared in the September 1947 issue of Billboard magazine. Marsolais served as Tatum's manager "probably for the rest of his life."

Tatum was able to earn a more-than-adequate living from his club performances. Billboard suggested that he could make at least $300 a week as a soloist in 1943; when he formed a trio later that year, it was advertised by booking agents at $750 a week. The other musicians in the trio were guitarist Tiny Grimes and bassist Slam Stewart. They were a commercial success on 52nd Street, attracting more customers than any other musician, with the possible exception of vocalist Billie Holiday, and they also appeared briefly on film, in an episode of The March of Time.

Leonard Feather's 1943 review in Metronome magazine marked a climax of critical reception for Tatum. Writing under the headline "Tatum Ultimatum", Feather praised Tatum's performances on 52nd Street, declaring him the greatest pianist in jazz history. Feather noted that while Tatum's solo nightclub acts sometimes featured elaborate, non-rhythmic arrangements that could offend jazz purists, these objections disappeared when he performed regular sets alongside musicians Slam Stewart and Tiny Grimes. Ultimately, Feather concluded that Tatum achieved absolute perfection across all aspects of his craft, driven by brilliant and inspired ideas executed with bewildering fluency.

Up to that point, critics had praised Tatum as a solo pianist, but the paying public had given him relatively little attention; with the trio, he enjoyed more popular success, although some critics expressed disappointment. Nevertheless, Tatum was awarded Esquire magazine's prize for pianists in its 1944 critics' poll, which led to his playing alongside other winners at a concert organized by Feather at the Metropolitan Opera House in New York. Feather also arranged a recording session for the winners of the critics poll, including Coleman Hawkins, Al Casey, Oscar Pettiford, Cootie Williams, Sid Catlett, and Edmond Hall, calling the group "Leonard Feather's All Stars". They recorded four tunes which were released in March 1944. A DownBeat magazine critic declared, "If anyone was skeptical about Tatum's ability to play with a jam unit, his doubts would be dispelled forever after hearing this bunch of discs." John Chilton noted in his Coleman Hawkins biography that Tatum was superlative, both in his backing role as an accompanist and as "a creator of flowing solos that swing ceaselessly."

Feather expounded on Tatum's talent in DownBeat in 1944: "[Tatum] is the apotheosis of jazz; it is the art of modern rhythmic music, of hot jazz, swing, syncopation, at its ultimate. His genius is so apparent that even those who have no musical understanding of what he does are content to be dazzled by his technique. What makes Tatum great, however, is not his technique; it’s the incredible flow of brilliant rhythmic and harmonic ideas that this technique enables him to express."

All of Tatum's 1944 studio recordings were with the trio, and radio appearances continued. He abandoned the trio in 1944, possibly at an agent's behest, and did not record with one again for eight years. Early in 1945, Billboard reported that the Downbeat Club on 52nd Street was paying Tatum $1,150 a week to play four 20-minute sets per night as a soloist. This was later described as an "unheard-of figure" for the time. The Billboard reviewer commented, "Tatum is given a broken-down instrument, some bad lights and nothing else", and observed that he was almost inaudible beyond the front seating because of the audience noise.

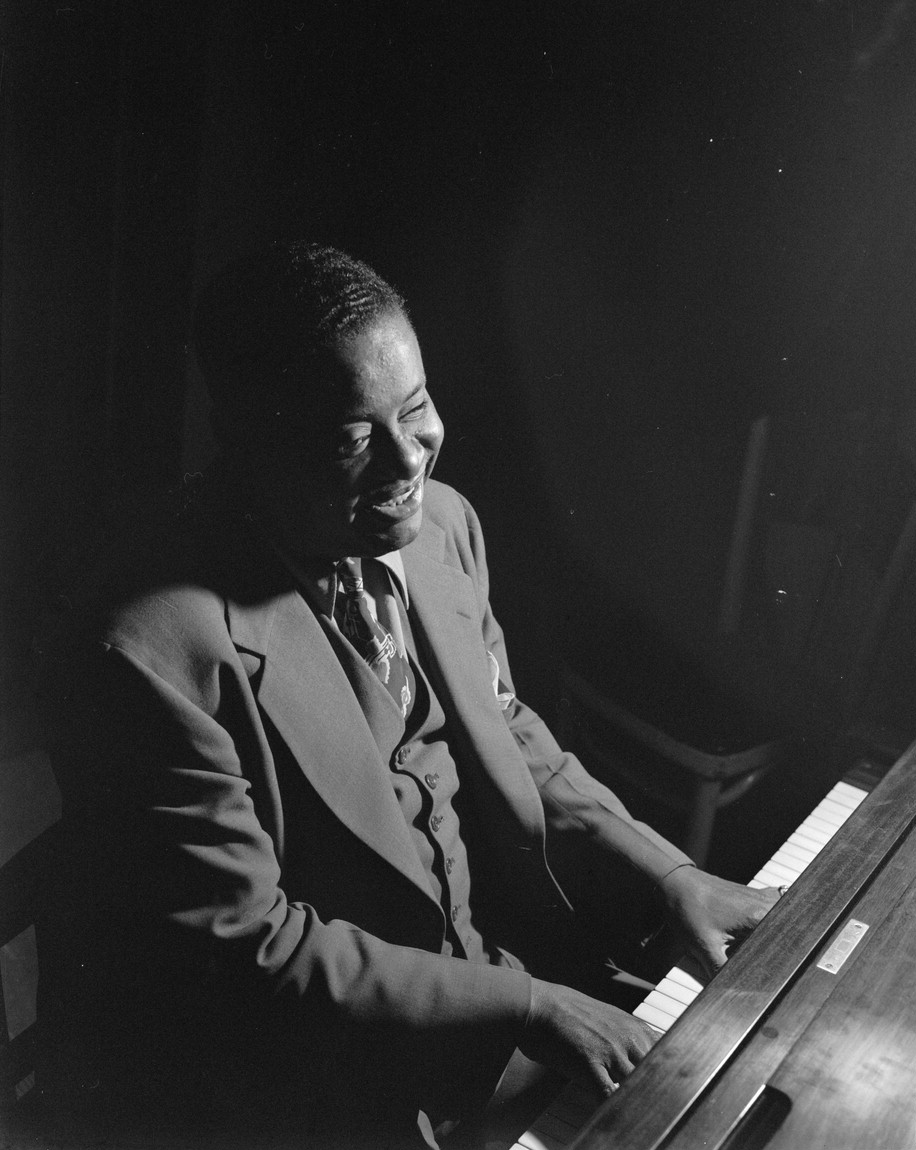
Tatum in 1946; by William P. Gottlieb

Aided by name recognition from his record sales and reduced entertainer availability because of the World War II draft, Tatum began to play in more formal jazz concert settings in 1944, appearing at concert halls in towns and universities all around the United States. The venues were much larger than jazz clubs – some had capacities in excess of 3,000 people – allowing Tatum to earn more money for much less work. Despite the more formal concert settings, Tatum preferred not to adhere to a set program of pieces for these performances.

Tatum recorded with the Barney Bigard Sextet and cut nine solo tracks in 1945. In October 1945, he recorded six tracks for V-Disc, which were not intended for commercial use but were for American troops abroad. Tatum introduced one of the pieces with these words:

Hello, fellows, this is Art Tatum. I've made a few records here for you on V-Disc, a few tunes that I'm sure that you'll enjoy—I don't know about the piano playing, you might enjoy the tunes themselves. I'm here in New York, and I thought maybe you'd like to hear a few of these tunes. There's very little I can say—I'd like to see all of you back as soon as you possibly can. So, any chance I can do any more, plenty more for you, I'd be glad to do it.

A fellow pianist from the years after World War II estimated that Tatum routinely drank two quarts (1.9 L) of whiskey and a case of beer over the course of 24 hours. (Note: A "case" of beer often refers to 24 beers, but there is not an official standard.) Almost all reports are that such drinking did not hinder his playing. A 1995 biography proposes that this habit, rather than being deliberately or uncontrollably self-destructive, was a product of his being careless about his health and of his enthusiasm for life.

Performances at concert settings continued in the second half of the 1940s, including participation in the second Esquire Jazz Concert at the Philharmonic Auditorium of Los Angeles in January 1945. Like the inaugural event, this concert served as a benefit for American troops. At that event, Duke Ellington presented the "Esky" trophy to Tatum, with the words "he is one of the greatest things that ever happened to jazz." Tatum also participated in the Norman Granz–produced Jazz at the Philharmonic events.

A tour of solo concert hall appearances by Tatum was booked for November 1945 by Joe Marsolais and William Randle, a disk jockey at WJLB in Detroit. Tour dates included the Auditorium Concert Bowl in Minneapolis, the Chicago Orchestra Hall, the Detroit Institute of Arts, the Cleveland Municipal Auditorium, and the Academy of the Arts in Philadelphia, where he was joined by Dizzy Gillespie and Coleman Hawkins. Additional bookings were scheduled in December for concert venues in Flint and Ann Arbor, Michigan; Madison, Wisconsin; Indianapolis and Cincinnati. Tatum was guaranteed the then unheard-of fee of $1,000 per night plus a percentage of the gross. Variety recalled that only 12 years earlier, Tatum had "beat the ivories" for a mere $30 per week.

Tatum was assisted during this period by his brother, Karl, who was recently discharged from the United States Navy. Karl served as a guide and personal manager. He recalled, "Art always traveled first-class. He bought first-class clothing, sometimes 15 or 20 suits at a time, and he lived well. But the biggest thing about traveling with Art was being with him. I was proud being introduced as 'Art's brother' because so many people loved him—as much, I think, for the kind of a person he was, as for his artistry."

In 1947, Tatum again appeared on film, in The Fabulous Dorseys. Columbia Records recorded and released a 1949 concert at the Shrine Auditorium in Los Angeles as Gene Norman Presents an Art Tatum Concert. In the same year, he signed to Capitol Records and recorded 26 pieces for it. He also played for the first time at Club Alamo in Detroit, but stopped when a black friend was not served. The owner subsequently advertised that black customers were welcome, and Tatum played there frequently in the next few years.

Although Tatum remained an admired figure, his popularity waned in the mid-to-late 1940s, likely due in large part to the advent of bebop, a musical style he did not embrace.

=== 1950–1956 ===
Tatum began working with a trio again in 1951. The trio – this time with bassist Slam Stewart and guitarist Everett Barksdale – recorded in 1952. In the same year, Tatum toured the U.S. with fellow pianists Erroll Garner, Pete Johnson, and Meade Lux Lewis, for concerts billed as "Piano Parade". The tour was a memorable experience for Garner, and, in a Jazz Journal blindfold test in 1962, he said:

Well all I can say is, that was the Pro, and he took it all with him! I was lucky enough to get to hear him on fifteen or sixteen one-nighters, on a thing called Piano Parade. Martha Glaser fixed up the show and we had Meade Lux Lewis, Albert Ammons, Teddy Wilson, Art Tatum and myself. That was 1954 [1952]. It was, from the old to the new, a whole piano show. I used to stand by that stage every night and I listened and I listened. He encouraged me a whole lot. I used to be scared to go on behind him ... or even before him for that matter. But like he used to tell me all the time: "You go on and play what you know—forget about me and what I'm playing. You get on out there and play what you know!" And after a couple of nights that loosened me up and I just played what I knew and it was alright. ... He played beautifully in that show and did all he could to help. He liked a couple of tunes I wrote and played them for me, and played them so well I just didn't want to play them anymore. He did so much to them, it was a shame for anyone else to even play them. (Note: Erroll Garner misremembers the personnel on this tour, as Albert Ammons and Teddy Wilson were not present, while Pete Johnson was. Additionally, no recording of a Garner tune played by Tatum is known.)

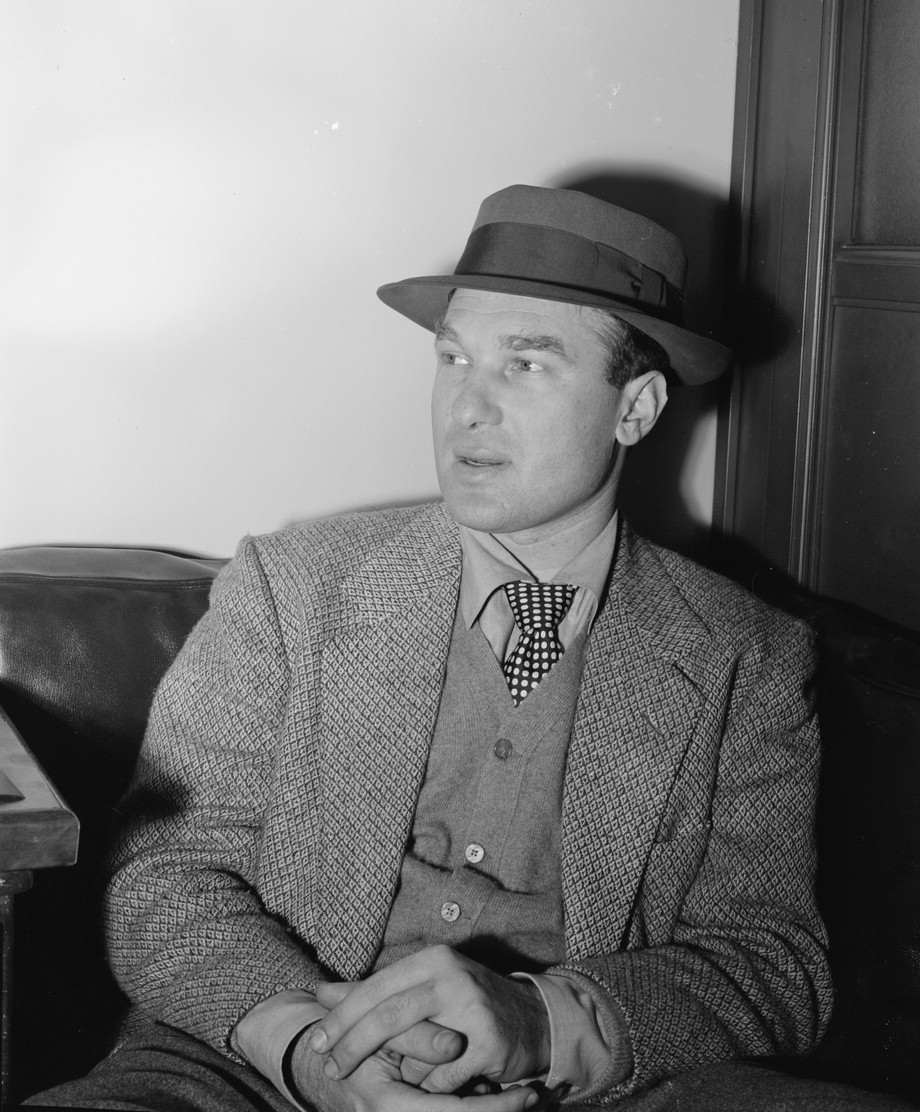
Jazz impresario Norman Granz, who recorded Tatum extensively in 1953–1956

Tatum's four-year absence from the recording studios as a soloist ended when Granz, who owned Clef Records, decided to record his solo playing in a way that was "unprecedented in the recording industry: invite him into the studio, start the tape, and let him play whatever he felt like playing. [...] At the time this was an astonishing enterprise, the most extensive recording that had been done of any jazz figure." Over several sessions starting late in 1953, Tatum recorded 124 solo tracks, all but three of which were released, spread over a total of 14 LPs. Granz reported that the recording tape ran out during one piece, but Tatum, instead of starting again from the beginning, asked to listen to a playback of just the final eight bars, then continued the performance from there on the new tape, maintaining the same tempo as on the initial recording. Clef released the solo pieces as The Genius of Art Tatum, which was added to the Grammy Hall of Fame in 1978.

Granz also recorded Tatum with a selection of other stars in seven more recording sessions, which led to 59 tracks being released. The critical reception was mixed and partly contradictory. Tatum was, variously, criticized for not playing real jazz, the choice of material, and being past his best, and was praised for the enthralling intricacy and detail of his playing and his technical perfection. Nevertheless, the releases renewed attention on him, including for a newer generation; he won the DownBeat Critics' Poll for pianists three years in a row from 1954. (He never won a DownBeat Readers' Poll.)

On his way from Miami to New York, Tatum visited a doctor in Washington, D.C., who diagnosed him with an advanced stage of diabetes. The doctor hinted to Everett Barksdale that Tatum's death was in only a matter of time.

Following a deterioration in health, Tatum stopped drinking in 1954 and tried to control his weight. Although he quit drinking, he continued to perform frequently. That year, his trio was part of bandleader Stan Kenton's 10-week tour named "Festival of Modern American Jazz". The trio did not play with Kenton's orchestra on the tour but had the same performance schedule, meaning Tatum sometimes traveled long distances by overnight train while the others stayed in a hotel and took a morning flight. He also appeared on television in The Spike Jones Show, on April 17, to promote the imminent release of The Genius of Art Tatum. Black American musicians were not often filmed at this time, so very few visual recordings of Tatum exist; however, his solo performance of "Yesterdays" on the show has survived as a video recording.

Tatum appeared on various television shows in his later years, and was a mainstay on The Tonight Show for three years; Steve Allen was co-creator and the first host of the show. Tatum even played a duet with Allen, who was a pianist, composer, and author, on the song "Fine and Dandy" on the June 2, 1956, broadcast. Tatum had also been booked for the November 11, 1956, show, but he would die six days earlier.

After two decades of marriage, Tatum and Ruby divorced early in 1955. They probably did not travel much together, and she had become an alcoholic; the divorce was acrimonious. Later that year, he married Geraldine Williamson, with whom he had probably already been living. She had little interest in music and did not normally attend his performances.

At the end of 1955, Tatum had lost 50 pounds of weight. Drummer Bill Douglass remembered, "One day he was a big fat jovial fellow, and the next thing he's kind of a little guy; all the clothes are too big for him. Yet it didn't slow him down any on the piano." During that time, Tatum was interviewed by journalist Alfred Duckett and spoke at length about his blindness, which was reported in the essay What a Blind Man Sees, quoted above.

In 1954–55, Tatum's East-Coast trio included Barksdale and Stewart, while his West-Coast trio included Red Callender on bass and Bill Douglass on drums. He also played with bassist Leroy Vinnegar. Callender later recalled, "Tatum never said anything to the audience. Fact is, we never did any announcements at all. The manager of the Royal Room came up to Tatum to ask if he would announce a celebrity in the audience, someone like Frank Sinatra. Art said no, he's part of the audience. Art's letting the manager know that he's the attraction, not who's in the audience. To Tatum, it was the plain, common, ordinary thing that a lot of great people showed up to hear him. We never even announced a tune, we just played. When we finished we got down off the stand. That's all there was to it."

Guitarist Johnny Smith was part of a touring "Festival" package with Tatum in 1954 and recalled, "We did 70 one-nighters in a row ... At that time Art had serious health problems, and I sat across from him on the bus, and he never complained on any of the legs of the tour that we did. I could see that the poor guy's ankles were swollen up something terrible and he must have been in terrible pain, but he never complained."

By 1956, Tatum's health had deteriorated due to advanced uremia. Nevertheless, in February he took part in a recording session with clarinetist Buddy DeFranco, which prompted a DownBeat critic to say, "This is Buddy DeFranco's best album yet ... Art is in expansive, sometimes near-stomping form, and is throughout exhilarating."

In late June 1956, the press reported that Tatum had suffered a severe heart attack. Although the circumstances are unknown, it caused him to cancel some music festival bookings. In August of that year, he played to the largest audience of his career: 19,000 gathered at the Hollywood Bowl for another Granz-led event. Tatum showed no signs of exhaustion at the show, and he was as agile and imaginative as ever at a recording session with saxophonist Ben Webster the next month. That was the final of Granz's mammoth recording project which had encompassed 121 solo and 80 combo tracks featuring Tatum.

Granz later declared, having recorded "Nat King Cole (before he became a singer), Lester Young ... in almost 35 years of producing thousands of recordings ... [and] working with such diverse artists as Charlie Parker, Ella [Fitzgerald], Duke [Ellington], [Louis] Armstrong, [Count] Basie, Oscar Peterson, Lu Watters, Kid Ory, Roy [Eldridge], Dizzy [Gillespie], Hawk [Coleman Hawkins]—in fact, I think, in those three and a half decades I've probably been working with every great and near great jazz artist—the most important and satisfying work I ever had was the Tatum project—imagine! Having Art Tatum all to myself, an audience of one, doing almost 200 songs for me. I think, if I am ever remembered for any meaningful contribution to jazz it was presenting permanently for the future the incredible artistry of the greatest instrumental soloist in the history of jazz, Art Tatum."

The Hollywood Bowl show and the recording sessions with Webster invigorated Tatum enough to book a tour of various East-Coast nightclubs. The tour took place in September 1956, with Everett on guitar, while Stewart was replaced by bassist Bill Pemberton.

After playing at least two concerts in October, Tatum was too unwell to continue touring, so he returned to his home in Los Angeles. Musicians visited him on November 4, and other pianists played for him as he lay in bed.

Tatum died the next day at Queen of Angels Medical Center in Los Angeles from uremia. He was buried at Rosedale Cemetery in Los Angeles but was moved to the Forest Lawn cemetery in Glendale, California, in 1992, by his second wife, who wished to be buried beside him. Tatum was inducted into the DownBeat Jazz Hall of Fame in 1964 and given a Grammy Lifetime Achievement Award in 1989.

== Personality and habits ==
Tatum was independent-minded and generous with his time and money. Not wanting to be restricted by Musicians' Union rules, he avoided joining for as long as he could. He also disliked having attention drawn to his blindness: he did not want to be physically led and so planned his independent walk to the piano in clubs if possible.

According to drummer Bill Douglass, Tatum routinely carried large amounts of cash and favored newly-minted five-dollar bills. To maintain his independence despite his blindness, Tatum organized his currency across different pockets so he could pay without assistance. Douglass noted that Tatum preferred fresh banknotes because the textured embossing allowed him to identify denominations by touch.

People who met Tatum consistently "describe him as totally lacking in arrogance or ostentation" and as gentlemanly. He avoided discussing his personal life and history in interviews and conversation with acquaintances. Although marijuana use was common among musicians during his lifetime, Tatum was not linked to the use of illegal drugs.

== After hours and repertoire ==
Tatum was reputedly more spontaneous and creative in free-form nocturnal sessions than in his scheduled performances. In a professional setting, he typically catered to the audience by playing songs similar to his recorded versions, often declining encores. In after-hours sessions with friends, by contrast, his playing was less confined: he would play the blues, improvise extensively on the same chord sequences, and move further away from the original melody. Tatum also sometimes sang the blues in such settings, accompanying himself on piano. Composer and historian Gunther Schuller described "a night-weary, sleepy, slurry voice, of lost love and sexual innuendos which would have shocked (and repelled) those 'fans' who admired Tatum for his musical discipline and 'classical' [piano] propriety".

In after-hours performances, Tatum's repertoire was much wider than in professional appearances, at which his staples were American popular songs. During his career, he also played his own arrangements of a few classical piano pieces, including Dvořák's Humoresques and Massenet's "Élégie", and recorded around a dozen blues pieces. Over time, he added to his repertoire: by the late 1940s, most of the new pieces were medium-tempo ballads but also included compositions that presented him with harmonic challenges, such as the simplicity of "Caravan" and complexity of "Have You Met Miss Jones?". He did not add to the classical pieces he had used earlier.

== Style and technique ==
The saxophonist Benny Green wrote that Tatum was the only jazz musician to "attempt to conceive a style based upon all styles, to master the mannerisms of all schools, and then synthesize those into something personal". Tatum was able to transform the styles of preceding jazz piano through virtuosity: where other pianists had employed repetitive rhythmic patterns and relatively simple decoration, he created "harmonic sweeps of colour [and] unpredictable and ever-changing shifts of rhythm".

"Lonesome Graveyard Blues"
Tatum's bitonal playing with Oscar Moore on "Lonesome Graveyard Blues" (1941)

"Too Marvelous for Words"
Reworked harmony, rhythmic flexibility, and multiple styles on Tatum's version of "Too Marvelous for Words" (1953)

Musicologist Lewis Porter identified three aspects of Tatum's playing that a casual listener might miss: the dissonance in his chords; his advanced use of substitute chord progressions; and his occasional use of bitonality (playing in two keys at the same time). There are examples on record of the last of these, going back to 1934, making Tatum the most advanced harmonically "out" of jazz musicians until Lennie Tristano. On occasion, the bitonality was against what another musician was playing, as in "Lonesome Graveyard Blues" with guitarist Oscar Moore. Before Tatum, jazz harmony was mainly triadic, with flattened sevenths and infrequent ninths; he went beyond that, influenced by Debussy and Ravel. He incorporated upper intervals, such as elevenths and thirteenths, and added tenths (and greater intervals) to the left-hand vocabulary of stride.

Tatum improvised in a manner atypical of modern jazz. Rather than creating new melodic lines over a harmonic progression, he implied or played the original melody or fragments of it, while superimposing counter-melodies and new phrases to build new structures based on variation. "The harmonic lines may be altered, reworked or rhythmically rephrased for moments at a time, but they are still the base underneath Tatum's superstructures. The melodic lines may be transformed into fresh shapes with only a note or a beat or a phrase particle retained to associate the new with the original, yet the melody remains, if only in the listener's imagination." This flexibility extended to his use of rhythm: regardless of the tempo, he could alter the number of notes per beat and use other techniques at the same time to alter his phrasing's rhythmic intensity and shape. His rhythmic sense also allowed him to move away from an established tempo for extended periods without losing the beat.

For critic Martin Williams, there was also the matter of Tatum's sly humor when playing: "when we fear he is reaching the limits of romantic bombast, a quirky phrase, an exaggerated ornament will remind us that Tatum may be having us on. He is also inviting us to share the joke and heartily kidding himself as well as the concert hall traditions to which he alludes."

Until the 1940s, Tatum's style was based on popular song form, which often meant two bars of melodic development followed by two more melodically static bars, which he filled with rapid runs or arpeggios. Beginning in the 1940s, he progressively lengthened the runs to eight or more bars, sometimes continuing them across the natural eight-bar boundaries of a composition's structure, and began to use a harder, more aggressive attack. He also increased the frequency of harmonic substitutions and the variety of musical devices employed by his left hand, and developed a greater harmonic and contrapuntal balance across the piano's upper and lower registers. Gunther Schuller argues that Tatum was still developing toward the end of his life – he had greater rhythmic flexibility when playing at a given tempo, more behind-the-beat swing, more diverse forms of expression, and he employed far fewer musical quotations than earlier in his career.

Critic Whitney Balliett wrote of Tatum's style, "his strange, multiplied chords, still largely unmatched by his followers, his laying on of two and three and four melodic levels at once [...] was orchestral and even symphonic." This style was not one that could be adapted to the form of bebop: "the orchestral approach to the keyboard [...] was too thick, too textured to work in the context of a bebop rhythm section."

Tatum's approach has also been criticized on other grounds. Pianist Keith Jarrett has said that Tatum played too many notes, and a criticism of him in a band setting was that he often did not modify his playing, overwhelming the other musicians and appearing to compete with any soloist he was ostensibly supporting. Clarinetist Buddy DeFranco said that playing with Tatum was "like chasing a train", and Tatum himself said that a band got in his way.

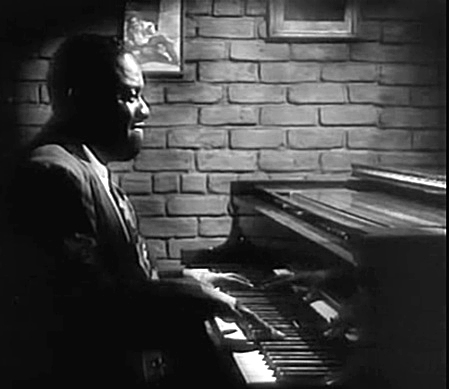
A screen capture from the 1947 film The Fabulous Dorseys, showing Tatum's straight-fingered technique

Tatum maintained a calm physical demeanor at the keyboard, avoiding theatrical crowd-pleasing gestures. This increased his playing's impact, as did his seemingly effortless technique, as pianist Hank Jones observed: the apparently horizontal gliding of his hands across the keys stunned his contemporaries. Tatum's relatively straight-fingered technique, compared to the curvature taught in classical training, contributed to this visual impression: a critic wrote in 1935 that, when playing, "Tatum's hand is almost perfectly horizontal, and his fingers seem to actuate around a horizontal line drawn from wrist to finger tip."

Tatum was able to use his thumbs and little fingers to add melody lines while playing something else with his other fingers; drummer Bill Douglass, a member of his trio, said that Tatum would "do runs with these two fingers up here and then the other two fingers of the same hand playing something else down there. Two fingers on the black keys, and then the other two fingers would be playing something else on the white keys. He could do that in either hand". His large hands allowed him to play a left-hand trill with thumb and forefinger while also using his little finger to play a note an octave lower. He was also capable of reaching twelfth intervals in either hand, and could play a succession of chords such as the illustrated examples at high speed. (Note: In an informal recording from 1952, he can be heard playing A♭ and D♭, "demonstrates it, fills it out, and responds that it's 'Not too bad when you fill it out'.") He was able to play all of his chosen material in any key.

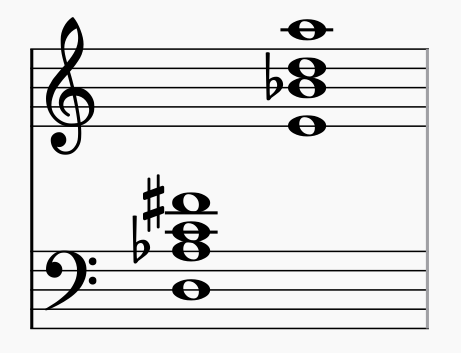
Examples of chords played by Tatum that "were easy for him to reach"

Tatum's touch has also attracted attention: for Balliett, "No pianist has ever hit notes more beautifully. Each one [...] was light and complete and resonant, like the letters on a finely printed page. Vast lower-register chords were unblurred, and his highest notes were polished silver." Tatum maintained these qualities of touch and tone even at the quickest tempos, when almost all other pianists would be incapable of playing the notes at all. Pianist Chick Corea said, "Tatum is the only pianist I know of before Bill [Evans] that also had that feather-light touch – even though he probably spent his early years playing on really bad instruments."

Among the musicians who said that Tatum could make a bad piano sound good were Billy Taylor and Gerald Wiggins. Wiggins said that Tatum could identify and avoid using any keys on a piano that were not working, while guitarist Les Paul recounted that Tatum sometimes resorted to pulling up stuck keys with one hand, mid-performance, so that he could play them again.

In his book God Is in the House: A Biography of Art Tatum, Mark Lehmstedt observed that Tatum's musical approach departed significantly from the prevailing standards of his era, as he prioritized creating music intended purely for listening rather than entertainment such as dancing, or background atmosphere in social venues and homes, or supporting theatrical stage shows. Consequently, only a small minority of listeners appreciated jazz as pure music – a group mostly limited to dedicated collectors who studied recordings, active or aspiring musicians, and a small circle of specialized music critics emerging in the early 1930s.

Musically, Tatum was influenced by the Harlem stride style. Although he achieved complete technical mastery of this traditional piano method, it gradually evolved into an "implicit stride" technique, which liberated his left hand for unrestricted, independent improvisation. He possessed extraordinary velocity, executing complex runs, arpeggios, and rhythmic divisions across both hands simultaneously. He was especially noted for rapid, ascending and descending pentatonic scales played using only three fingers – a technique that became a personal signature and was widely emulated by other pianists.

Furthermore, Tatum frequently employed extensive rubato (out-of-tempo) passages and subtle metrical shifts. These variations often led listeners to believe he had lost the rhythm entirely, though precise counting invariably reveals that his timing remained perfect. Critics and peers frequently remarked on his multi-dimensional and orchestral playing style, noting his ability to continuously layer distinct musical ideas while always maintaining "swing". Despite the profound complexity of his performances, Tatum's recordings project an impression of complete relaxation and fluid ease. Rather than relying on extreme dynamics like pianissimo or fortissimo, he generated musical intensity through an array of devices and increasingly intricate harmonies.

While early recording limitations obscured many details of his nuanced piano work, accounts from his contemporaries emphasized his masterful pedal technique. When asked about the origin of his exceptional technique and inspiration, Tatum offered a modest response, simply gesturing toward the instrument and stating that "It's all there, waiting to be played."

== Legacy ==
=== Influence ===
Tatum's improvisational style extended what was possible in jazz piano. The virtuoso solo aspects of his style were taken on by pianists such as Adam Makowicz, Simon Nabatov, Oscar Peterson, and Martial Solal. Even musicians who played in different styles, such as Bud Powell, Lennie Tristano, and Herbie Hancock, memorized and recreated some of his recordings to learn from them. Although Powell was part of the bebop movement, his prolific and exciting style showed Tatum's influence. Mary Lou Williams said, "Tatum taught me how to hit my notes, how to control them without using pedals. And he showed me how to keep my fingers flat on the keys to get that clean tone."

Tatum's influence went beyond the piano: his innovations in harmony and rhythm established new ground in the broader jazz landscape. Based upon his use of frequent chord changes, jazz musicians became more attuned to harmonic possibilities, which helped lay the foundations for the emergence of bebop in the 1940s. His modern chord voicing and chord substitutions were also pioneering in jazz.

Other musicians sought to transfer elements of Tatum's pianistic virtuosity to their instruments. When newly arrived in New York, saxophonist Charlie Parker worked for three months as a dishwasher in a restaurant where Tatum was performing and often listened to him. "Perhaps the most important idea Parker learned from Tatum was that any note could be made to fit in a chord if suitably resolved." Trumpeter Dizzy Gillespie was also affected by Tatum's speed, harmony, and daring solos. Vocalist Tony Bennett incorporated aspects of Tatum into his singing: "I'd listen to his records almost daily and try to phrase like him. [...] I just take his phrasing and sing it that way." Saxophonist Coleman Hawkins changed his playing style after hearing Tatum play in Toledo in the 1920s: Hawkins's "arpeggio-based style and his growing vocabulary of chords, of passing chords and the relationships of chords, were confirmed and encouraged by his response to Art Tatum." This style was hugely influential on the development of jazz saxophone playing, and helped establish the saxophone as the dominant jazz instrument.

Some musicians were hampered by exposure to Tatum's abilities. Many pianists tried to copy him and attain the same level of ability, hindering their progress toward finding their own styles. Others, including trumpeter Rex Stewart and pianists Oscar Peterson and Bobby Short, were overwhelmed by Tatum's brilliance and began to question their own abilities. Some musicians, including Les Paul and Everett Barksdale, stopped playing the piano altogether and switched to another instrument after hearing Tatum.

=== Critical standing ===
There is limited published information available about Tatum's life. A full-length biography has been published – Too Marvelous for Words (1994), by James Lester. (Note: There is also a 2009 self-published biography in German (Art Tatum, by Mark Lehmstedt) and a self-published account of Tatum's life in Toledo up to 1932 (The History of Art Tatum, 1909–1932, by Imelda Hunt).) A second major biography, entitled God Is in the House – A Biography of Art Tatum, was written by Mark Lehmstedt and was published by Berlin's Wolke Verlag in 2024. This lack of detailed coverage may be attributable to Tatum's life and music not fitting any of the established critical narratives or frameworks for jazz: many historians of the music have marginalized him for this, so "not only is Tatum underrepresented in jazz criticism but his presence in jazz historiography seems largely to prompt no particular effort in historians beyond descriptive writing designed to summarize his pianistic approach".

Critics have expressed strong opinions about Tatum's artistry: "Some applaud Tatum as supremely inventive, while others say that he was boringly repetitive, and that he barely improvised." Gary Giddins suggests that Tatum's standing has not been elevated to the very highest level of jazz stars among the public, because he did not employ the expected linear style of improvisation, and instead played in a way that requires listeners to concentrate, so he "becalms many listeners into hapless indifference".

In the 1980s, musicologist Gunter Schuller conducted a detailed analysis of two of Tatum's Capitol Records recordings: "Willow Weep for Me" and "Aunt Hagar's Blues". Schuller concluded that these performances represented some of Tatum's finest work, noting that each musical phrase developed organically and cohesively from the last. Schuller observed that while Tatum treated the original source material with the greatest respect and gave distinct characters to individual choruses, he held back from overusing his signature technical flourishes. According to Schuller, this restraint gave these performances a highly structured, almost composed character.

When Tom Piazza, a jazz critic of The New York Times, reviewed the Tatum album Twentieth Century Piano Genius in 1996, he enthused: "There is a marvelous sense of presence on these recordings; Tatum is at his most relaxed and allusive, playing with a kind of intellectual ferocity and sardonic wit that is absolutely awe-inspiring. At times, as on his version of 'Don't Blame Me', he drapes the melody with dense, velvety chords that conceal as much as they reveal of the tune's outlines. At other times, he attacks songs from several angles at once, jabbing, smearing and distorting them, as he does on the rambunctious and hilarious deconstruction of 'Makin' Whoopee'. On 'Too Marvelous for Words' and two radically different and equally brilliant versions each of 'Love for Sale' and 'Sweet Lorraine', all the listener can do is hold on and watch, amazed, as an entirely new musical landscape emerges under Tatum’s hands from the familiar map of the tunes."

=== Other forms of recognition ===
In 1989, Tatum's hometown of Toledo established the Art Tatum African American Resource Center in its Kent Branch Library. It contains print and audio materials and microfiche, and organizes cultural programs, including festivals, concerts, and a gallery for local artists.

In 1993, Jeff Bilmes, an MIT student in the field of computational musicology coined the term "tatum" in recognition of the pianist's speed. It has been defined as "the smallest time interval between successive notes in a rhythmic phrase", and "the fastest pulse present in a piece of music".

In 2003, a historical marker was placed outside Tatum's childhood home at 1123 City Park Avenue in Toledo, but by 2017 the unoccupied property was in a state of disrepair. In 2021, Art Tatum Zone, a nonprofit organization, was awarded grants to restore the house and improve the neighborhood. Also in Toledo, the Lucas County Arena unveiled a 27-feet-high sculpture, the "Art Tatum Celebration Column", in 2009.
