= Shrine Auditorium and Expo Hall =

Large event venue in Los Angeles, California

Coordinates: 34°01′24″N 118°16′54″W

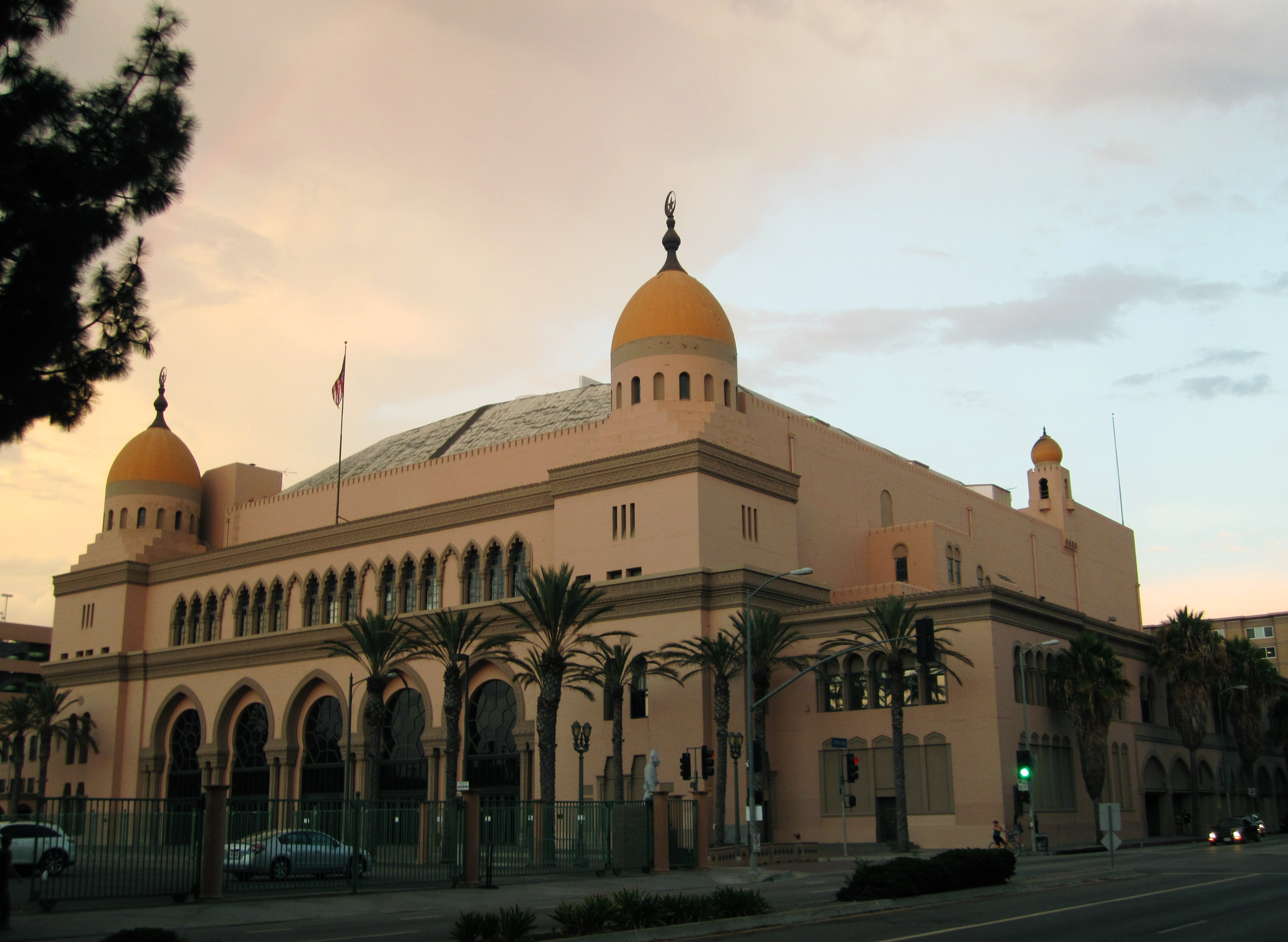
- Exterior of venue (c.2012)
- Address: 665 W Jefferson Blvd; Los Angeles, California, 90007
- Location: University Park
- Owner: Al Malaikah Auditorium Company
- Operator: Goldenvoice
- Capacity: 6,300 (Auditorium); 5,000 (Expo Hall)
- Type: Indoor theater Convention center
- Public transit: Jefferson/USC

Construction
- Built: 1925
- Opened: January 23, 1926; 100 years ago
- Renovated: 2002
- Cost: $2.7 million ($49.6 million in 2025 dollars)

Tenant
- USC Trojans (NCAA) (1939-72)

Website
- shrineauditorium.com
- Al Malaikah Temple
- U.S. National Register of Historic Places
- Los Angeles Historic-Cultural Monument
- Architect: John C. Austin
- Architectural style: Moorish Revival
- NRHP reference No.: 87000577
- LAHCM No.: 139

Significant dates
- Added to NRHP: April 2, 1987
- Designated LAHCM: March 5, 1975

The Shrine Auditorium and Expo Hall is a landmark large-event venue in Los Angeles. It is also the headquarters of the Al Malaikah Temple, a division of the Shriners. It was designated a Los Angeles Historic-Cultural Monument (No. 139) in 1975, and was added to the National Register of Historic Places in 1987.

== History ==
Opened on January 23, 1926, the Shrine Auditorium replaced an earlier 1906 Al Malaikah Temple which had been destroyed by a fire on January 11, 1920. The fire gutted the structure in just 30 minutes nearly killing six firefighters. In the late 1960s, the Shrine was referred to as "The Pinnacle" by the audiences of rock concerts.

In 2002, the auditorium underwent a $15 million renovation which upgraded the stage with state-of-the-art lighting and rigging systems, and included new roofing and air conditioning for the Auditorium and Expo Center, modernized concession stands, additional restrooms, repainting of the Expo Center, and a new performance plaza and parking garage. The entire complex has a Moroccan architectural motif. In 2012, Goldenvoice, a subsidiary of AEG Worldwide, announced that it would assume all booking and operations of the venue.

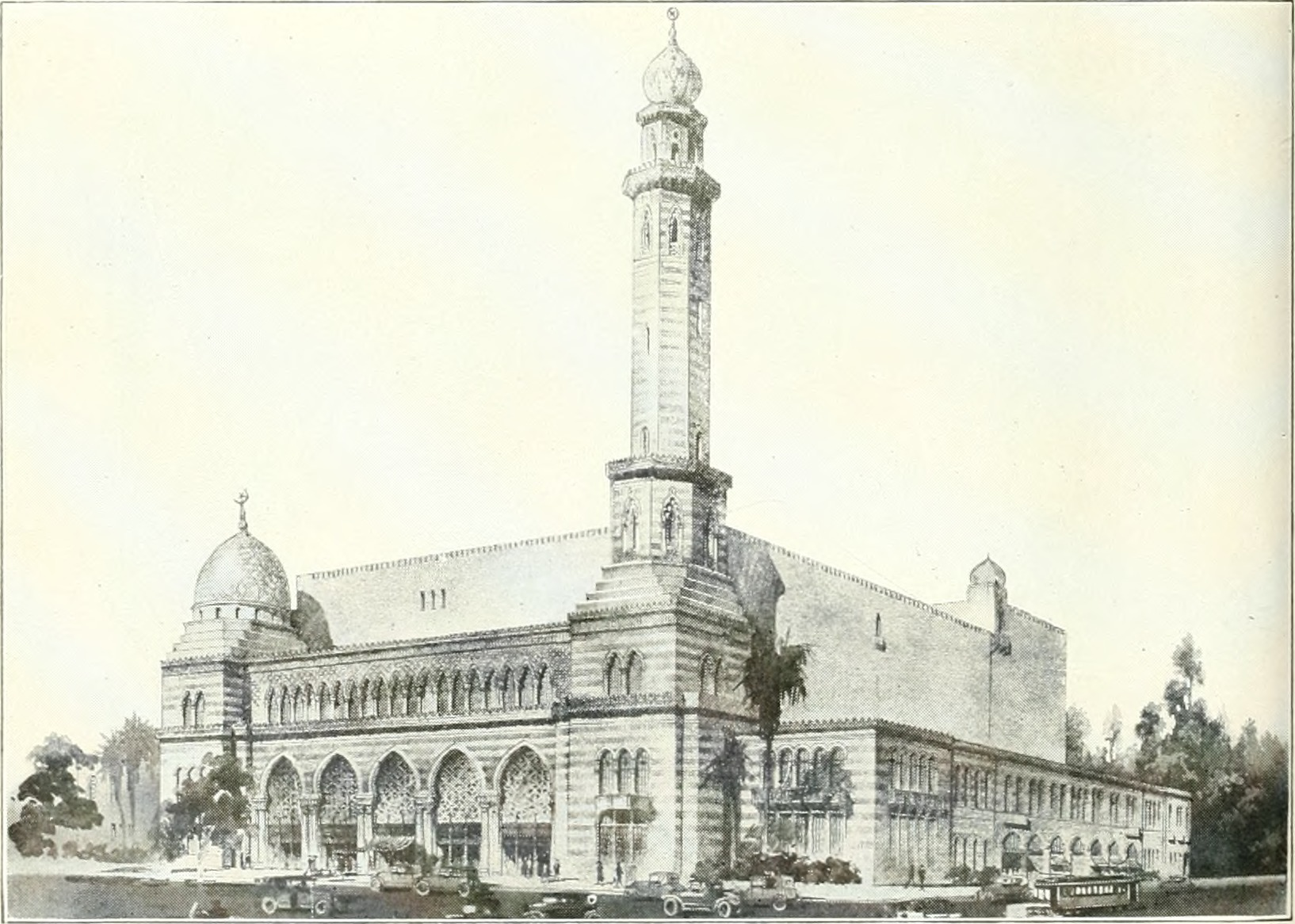
The old Shrine Auditorium, 1905

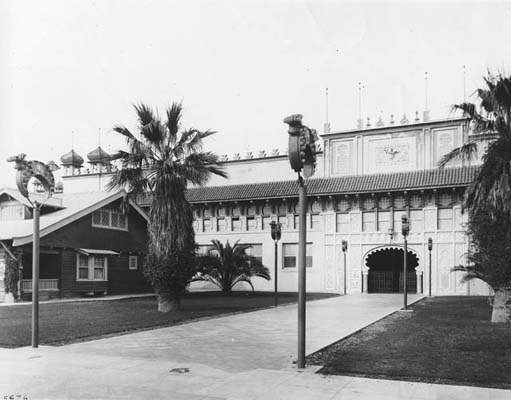
The old Shrine Auditorium, 1910

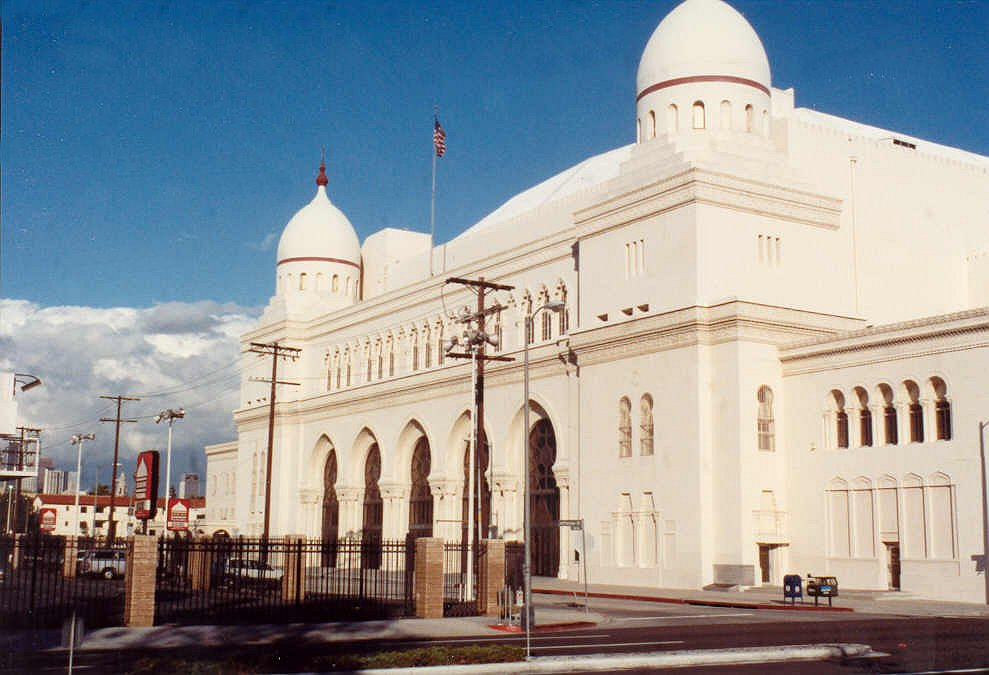
The Shrine Auditorium in 1990, before the 2002 renovations

== Building ==
The auditorium was designed in the Moorish Revival style by San Francisco-based theater architect G. Albert Lansburgh, with local architects John C. Austin and Abram M. Edelman associated. When built, the auditorium could hold 1,200 people on stage and seat an audience of 6,442.

The Shrine Auditorium seats approximately 6,300 people (reduced during the 2002 renovation from the original 6,700 capacity) and has a stage 194 ft (59 m) wide and 69 ft (21 m) deep. The Auditorium features two boxes above the orchestra level holding 40 people each and seven loges on the balcony holding between 36 and 47 seats each (total capacity of the loges: 274). Of the remaining seats, 2,964 are on the orchestra level and 2,982 on the balcony level.

Adjacent to the Auditorium is the Shrine Exposition Hall. This is a multi-purpose event facility. It features 54,000 square feet (5,000 m^{2}) of exhibit and meeting space—34,000 in the main level and 20,000 in an open mezzanine. The Exposition Hall has a capacity of 5,000 patrons. Trade shows, banquets, conventions and electronic music festivals, among other events, have been held there.

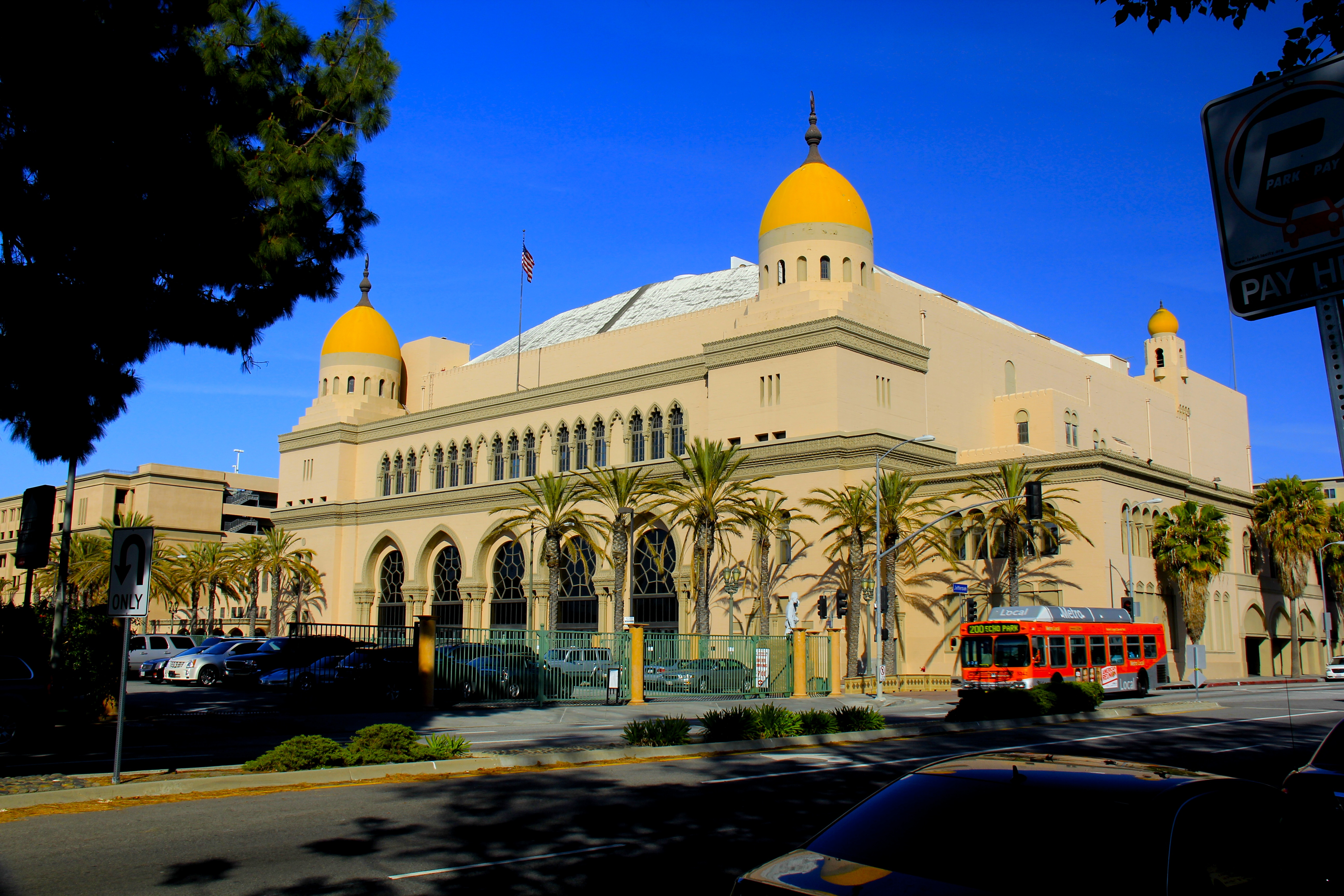
View of the building from University Park

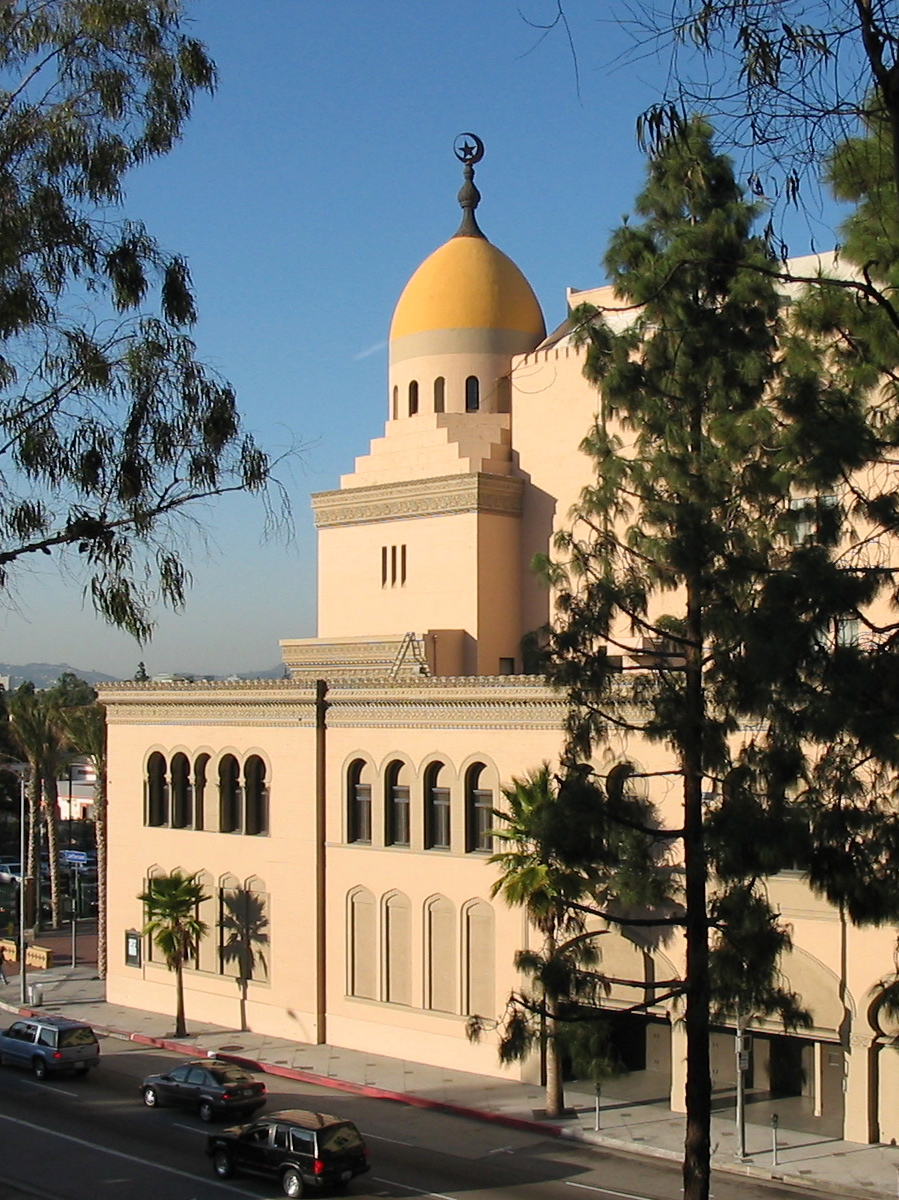
Southwest facade

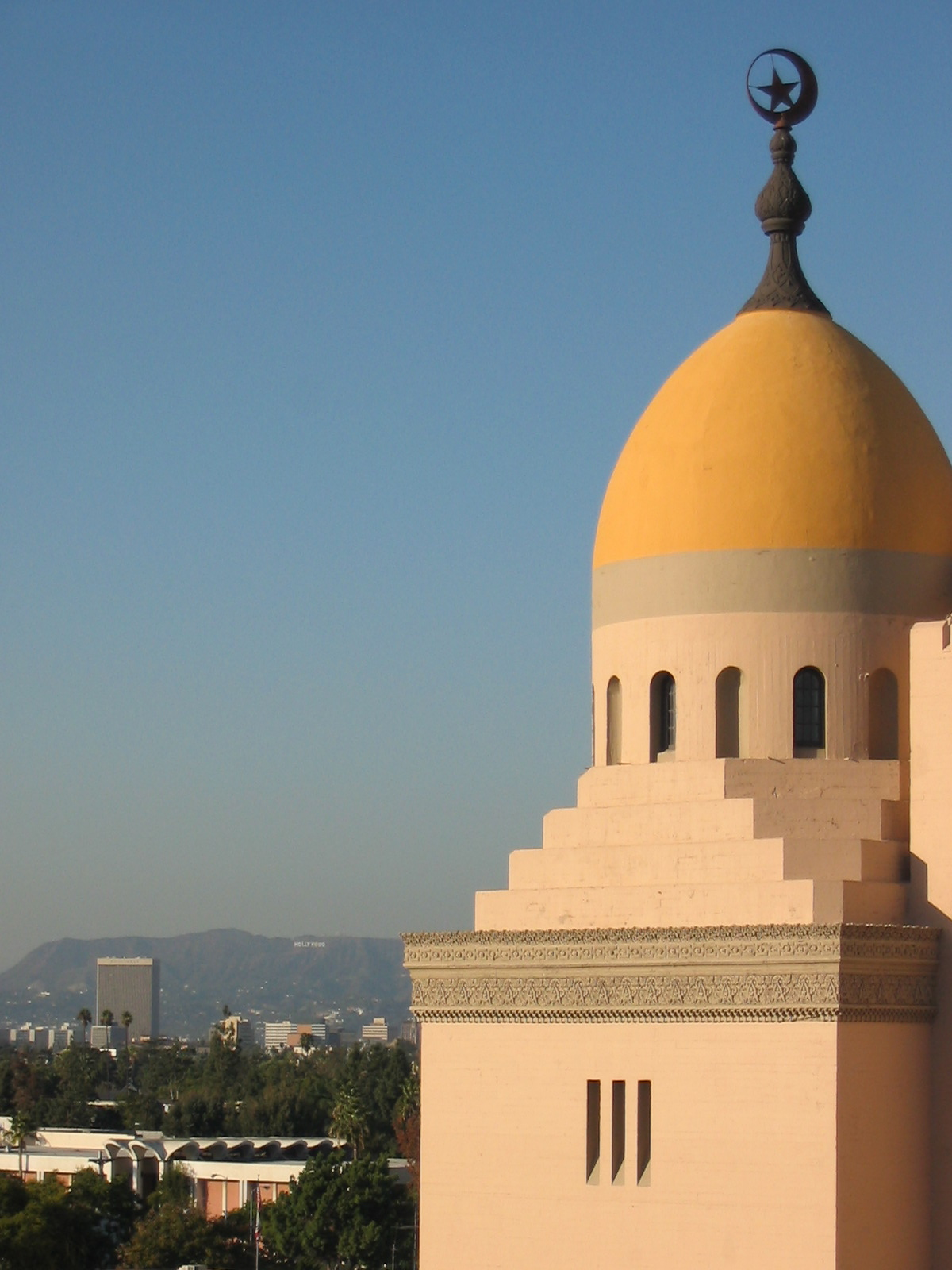
South Spire

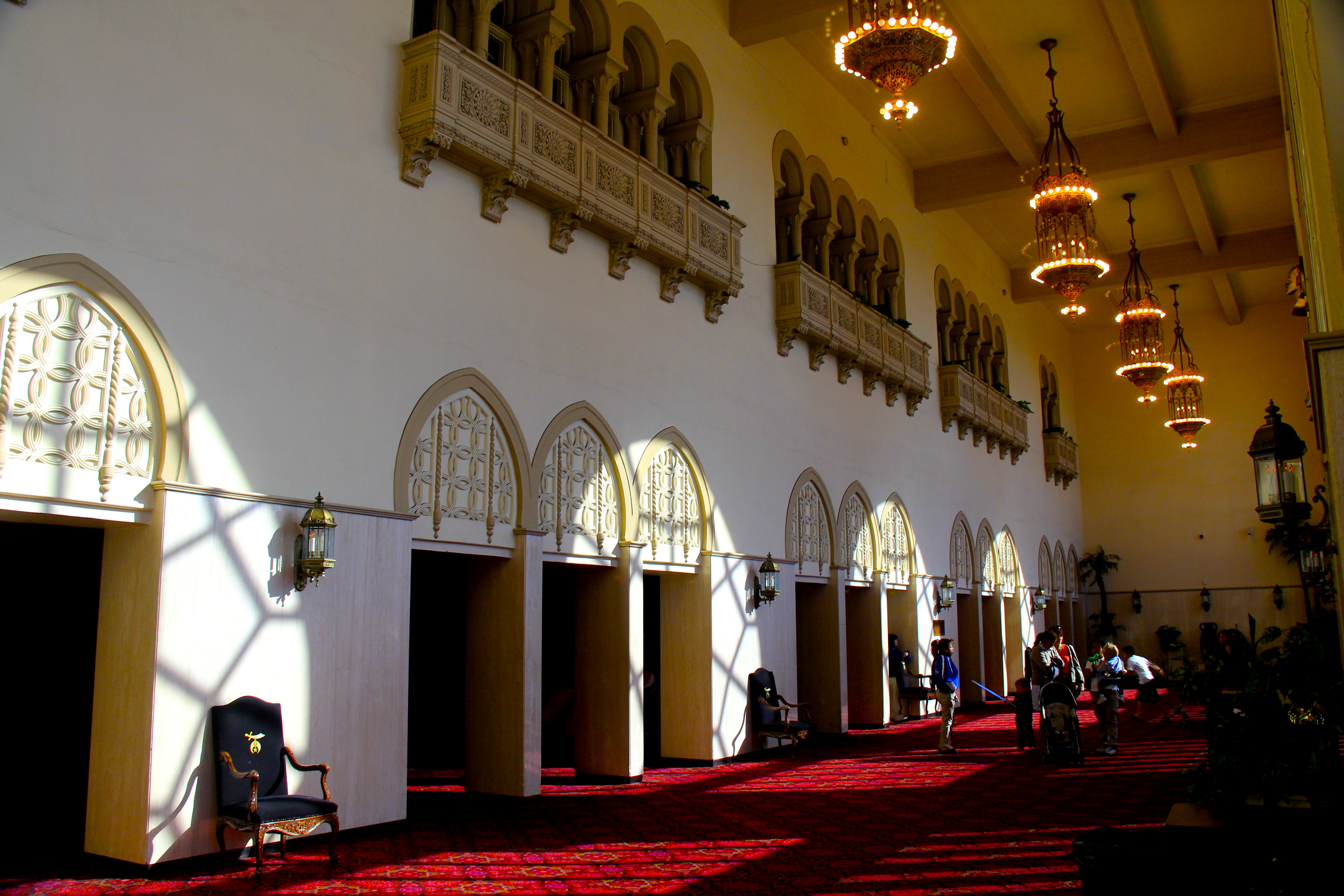
Royal Street vestibule

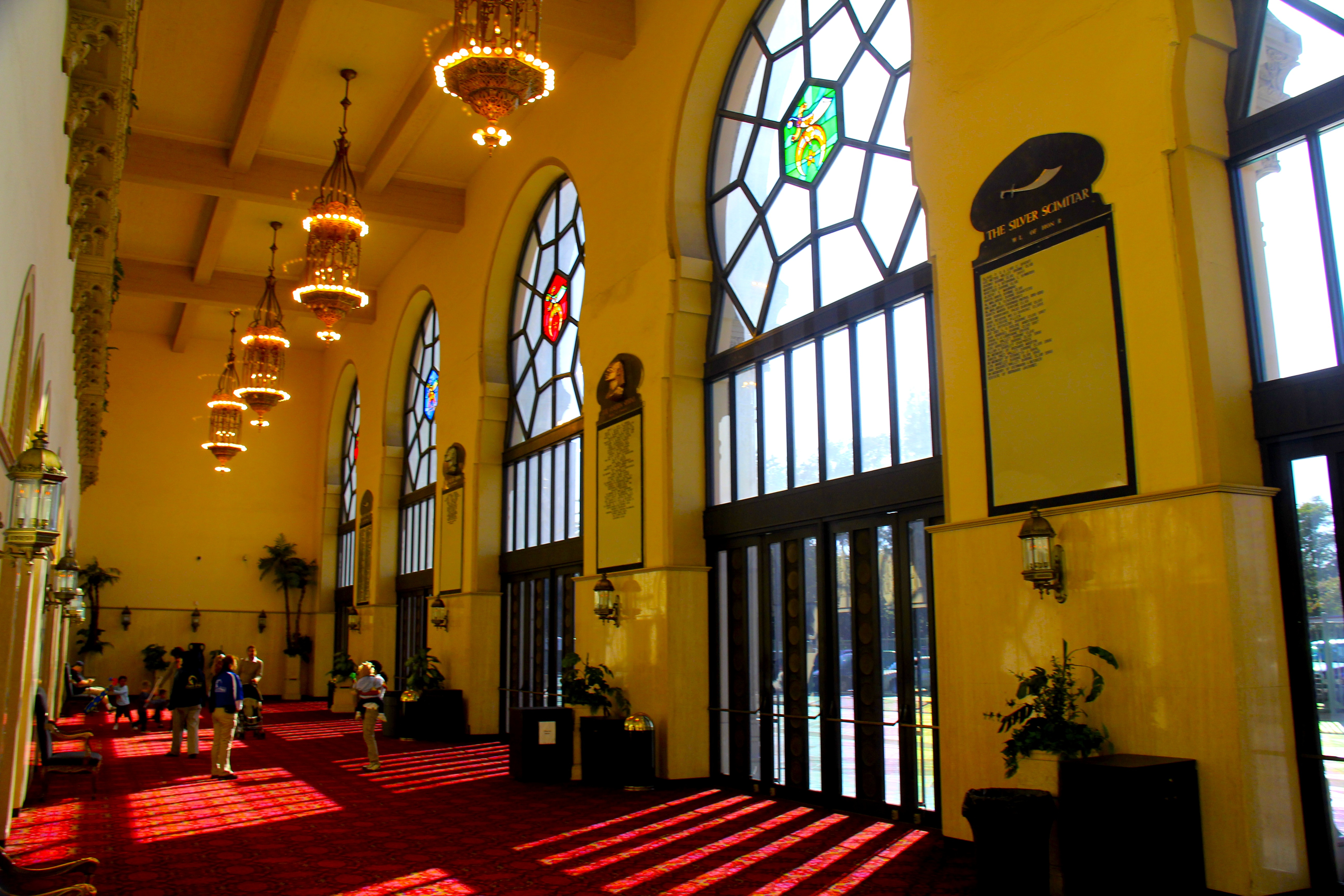
vestibule different angle

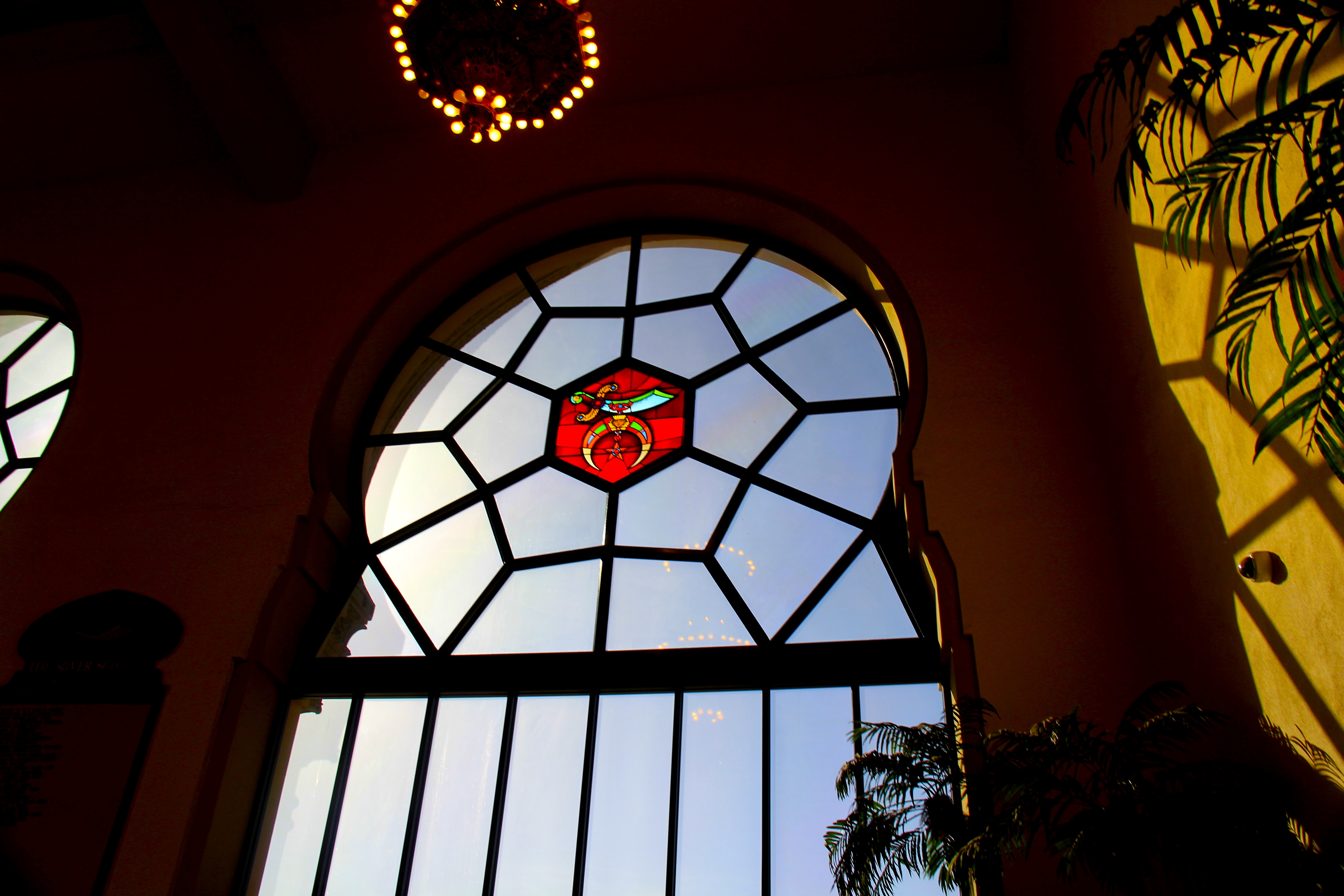
Detail of stained glass window

== Notable events ==
The Shrine Auditorium has hosted a number of events, mainly for entertainment:

Awards ceremony events
Event	Date
Academy Awards	1947–48, 1988–1989, 1991, 1995, 1997–1998, 2000–2001
Academy of Country Music Awards	1978, 1981
American Music Awards	1982–2006
BET Awards	2006–2012
Grammy Awards	1978–1980, 1982–1987, 1989–1990, 1993, 1995–1996, 1999
iHeartRadio Music Awards	2014–2015, 2022
Miss Universe	2006
MTV Movie & TV Awards	2001–2003, 2005, 2017
My VH1 Music Awards	2000–2001
NAACP Image Awards	2006–2013
People's Choice Awards	2001–2003, 2006–2009
Primetime Emmy Awards	1998–2000, 2002–2007
Screen Actors Guild Awards	1998–2020, 2024, 2025
Soul Train Music Awards	1989–2001
Teen Choice Awards	2014

Other media events
Date	Description
December 4, 1953	Annual Los Angeles Examiner Christmas Show.
July 1, 1995	Paris by Night 32: 20 Years At A Glance – Timeless Memories (Vietnamese music show)

Sports events
Date	Event
For 33 years	Home court for the USC's Trojans basketball team
Briefly	Some playoff games of the Los Angeles Lakers
January 7, 2025	WWE NXT: New Year's Evil
July 26. 2025	International Dance League (IDL) 2025 Launch Event
September 19-20, 2026	IDL 2026 Los Angeles Series & Championship

Movie shootings and premieres
Date	Movie	Description
1933	King Kong	Scenes where Kong was displayed manacled on stage.
1954	A Star Is Born	Some scenes.
December 9, 2017	Star Wars: The Last Jedi	World premiere.
2018	A Star Is Born	The final scene was filmed at the Shrine as an homage to the earlier 1954 film.
July 9, 2023	Barbie	World premiere.

Other shootings
Date	Film	Description
January 27, 1984	Pepsi commercial	American pop star Michael Jackson's hair was accidentally set on fire by the pyrotechnics. He suffered second-degree burns on his scalp as a result.

Music events and recordings
Date	Artist or event	Description
May 1949	Art Tatum	Solo piano performance was released by Columbia Records in 1952 as Gene Norman Presents an Art Tatum Concert
1955	The Great Shrine Auditorium Concert	Considered a major event in the histories of both American gospel and secular music. The event featured Dorothy Love Coates & The Original Gospel Harmonettes, Brother Joe May, The Caravans, James Cleveland, a young Sam Cooke performing with The Soul Stirrers.
June 8, 1956	Elvis Presley	Elvis Presley's first concert at the Shrine.
August 3, 1958	The Fourteenth Cavalcade of Jazz	Produced by Leon Hefflin Sr., featuring Ray Charles with The Cookies, Ann Fisher, Sam Cooke, William Everett Preston, Little Willie John, Bo Rhambo, and The Clark Kids. Sammy Davis Jr. crowned the Queen, Miss Jackie Joyce Simpson. Charles Trammel, Huggy Boy, Jim Randolph, and Hunter Hancock were the MCs for the starred event.
1964	Ray Charles	Recorded Live in Concert at the Shrine.
1967 and 1968	The Grateful Dead	The Grateful Dead played a total of nine shows, some of which were recorded and released commercially.
10 November 1967	The Grateful Dead	Performance was recorded and released (without Feedback) on Shrine Exposition Hall, Los Angeles, CA 11/10/1967 and as part of the 30-show release 30 Trips Around The Sun.
23 August 1968	The Grateful Dead	Performance was recorded and a substantial part of the show was released on the 50th anniversary edition of Anthem of the Sun.
24 August 1968	The Grateful Dead	Performance was recorded and released as Two from the Vault at the Shrine.
24 January 1975	Genesis	Live performance of The Lamb Lies Down on Broadway, released in 1998 and also 2025.
1976	The Tubes	3-night concert
November 8-9, 1995	Fugazi	Concert
December 16, 2000	KIIS-FM Jingle Ball	
December 19, 2001	KIIS-FM Jingle Ball	
December 6, 2005	KIIS-FM Jingle Ball	
1998; Since 2013	KROQ Almost Acoustic Christmas concert	
August 4 & 8, 2016	Radiohead	Live performance of A Moon Shaped Pool released in 2016.
December 20, 2019	My Chemical Romance	Reunion concert after a seven-year hiatus
December 21 & 22, 2022	The Smile	Live performance of A Light For Attracting Attention released in 2022.

Video games
Date	Game	Description
	Midnight Club: Los Angeles	Part of the South Central Map Expansion.
2023	Valorant	2023 Valorant Champions (Group Stage + Playoffs)

== See also ==
- List of convention centers in the United States
- List of Los Angeles Historic-Cultural Monuments in South Los Angeles
- List of Registered Historic Places in Los Angeles
- Bridges Auditorium
- Dorothy Chandler Pavilion

Preceded by Impact Arena (Thailand) Bangkok	Miss Universe Venue; 2006	Succeeded by National Auditorium; Mexico City
