= Big Jay McNeely =

American R&B saxophonist (1927–2018)

- Also known as: King of the Honkers
- Born: Cecil James McNeely; April 29, 1927; Los Angeles, California, U.S.
- Died: September 16, 2018 (aged 91) Moreno Valley, California, U.S.
- Genres: Jump blues; West Coast blues; jazz blues; R&B
- Occupation: Musician
- Instrument: Tenor saxophone
- Years active: Late 1940s–2018
- Labels: Cleopatra Blues, a division of Cleopatra Records; Swingin'

Cecil James "Big Jay" McNeely (April 29, 1927 – September 16, 2018) was an American R&B saxophonist.

== Biography ==
Inspired by Illinois Jacquet and Lester Young, McNeely teamed with his older brother Robert McNeely, who played baritone saxophone, and made his first recordings with drummer Johnny Otis, who ran the Barrelhouse Club that stood only a few blocks from McNeely's home. Shortly after he performed on Otis's "Barrel House Stomp." Ralph Bass, A&R man for Savoy Records, promptly signed him to a recording contract. Bass's boss, Herman Lubinsky, suggested the stage name Big Jay McNeely because Cecil McNeely did not sound commercial. McNeely's first hit was "The Deacon's Hop," an instrumental which topped the Billboard R&B chart in early 1949.

Big Jay McNeely performed for the famed fifth Cavalcade of Jazz concert held at Wrigley Field in Los Angeles produced by Leon Hefflin, Sr. on July 10, 1949. It was at this concert that McNeely and Lionel Hampton got into a showdown that resulted in pillows being thrown along with other items. His recording of "Blow Big Jay Blow" catapulted him into National prominence. McNeely and his Orchestra would come back to Los Angeles, to perform at the eleventh Cavalcade of Jazz on July 24, 1955 along with Lionel Hampton's Orchestra. The Medallions, The Penguins and James Moody would also be featured that same day.

Thanks to his flamboyant playing, called "honking," McNeely remained popular through the 1950s and into the early 1960s, recording for the Exclusive, Aladdin, Imperial, Federal, Vee-Jay, and Swingin' labels. But despite a hit R&B ballad, "There's Something on Your Mind," (1959) featuring Little Sonny Warner on vocals, and a 1963 album for Warner Bros. Records, McNeely's music career began to cool off. He quit the music industry in 1971 to become a postman. However, thanks to an R&B revival in the early 1980s, McNeely left the post office and returned to touring and recording full-time, usually overseas. His original tenor sax is enshrined in the Experience Music Project in Seattle, and he was inducted into the Rhythm and Blues Music Hall of Fame.

In 1989, Big Jay McNeely was performing with Detroit Gary Wiggins (European Saxomania Tour II) at the Quasimodo Club in West Berlin the night the Berlin Wall came down, "and Cold War legend has it that they blew down the Berlin Wall in 1989 with earth-shaking sonic sax torrents outside the Quasimodo Club in West Germany". McNeely and Wiggins toured in Germany and Italy with The International Blues Duo, Johnny Heartsman, Daryl Taylor (who worked with Arnett Cobb and Archie Bell & The Drells), Roy Gaines, Christian Rannenberg, Donald Robertson, Billy Davis Jr., "Hyepockets" Robertson, and Lee Allen.

Big Jay McNeely regularly performed at the International Boogie Woogie Festival in The Netherlands, and recorded an album with Martijn Schok, the festival's promoter, in 2009. The album was entitled Party Time, and one track from the album, "Get On Up and Boogie" (Parts 1, 2, and 3)", was featured on the vintage music compilation This is Vintage Now (2011).

He died in Moreno Valley, California, on September 16, 2018, of prostate cancer, at the age of 91.

== Style ==
Big Jay McNeely was credited as a performer in the saxophone honkers, with wild stage antics that led to equally wild crowds. "Shouters and stompers" like McNeely and Louis Jordan have been called "the forgotten fathers of rock 'n' roll".

Speaking in his sixties, McNeely said, "As time went on, they took my style, put a voice on it and it went from rhythm 'n' blues to rock 'n' roll. They could market that in the white market."

== Discography ==
- Big Jay McNeely, (1954, 10", Federal)
- A Rhythm and Blues Concert, (1955, 10", Savoy)
- Big Jay McNeely in 3-D (1956, Federal), (1959, King)
- Live at Cisco's, (1963, Warner Bros.) – recorded live at a jazz club in Manhattan Beach, California, in 1962.
- Swingin' , (1984, Collectables) – 1957–1961 recordings, including unreleased sides.
- Live at Birdland, 1957, (1992, Collectables – live performances recorded in stereo at the Seattle, Washington, Birdland Club in 1957.
- Nervous, (1995, Saxophile) – rarities, live cuts and alternate takes (from the Federal and Swingin' Records vaults) from 1951–1957.
- Blow the Wall Down, Sunset Studios, Sinzig/Rhein, Germany (1990)
- Blues at Daybreak, Big Jay McNeely & Christian Rannenberg (1993)
- Fool for the Ladies, by EB Davis with Detroit Gary Wiggins & Big Jay McNeely (1996)
- Crazy, (1997, Saxophile) – same as Nervous above.
- Central Avenue Confidential, (1999, Atomic Theory) – featuring Red Young on B-3 organ.
- Big Jay McNeely, The Deacon, Unabridged, Vol. 1, 1948–1950 (2006, Swingin') – complete 1948–1955 released output.
- Big Jay McNeely, The Deacon, Unabridged, Vol. 2, 1951–1952 (2006, Swingin')
- Big Jay McNeely, The Deacon, Unabridged, Vol. 3, 1953–1955 (2006, Swingin')
- Saxy Boogie Woogie (2008, Vagabond) with Axel Zwingenberger & The Bad Boys
- Party Time, featuring Martijn Schok, Rinus Groeneveld (2009)
- Party Time Volume 2, featuring Martijn Schok, Rinus Groeneveld (2011)
- Life Story, featuring Ray Collins' Hot-Club & Friends (2012)
- Big Jay McNeely – Blowin’ Down The House – Big Jay’s Latest & Greatest (2016)
- Big Jay McNeely – Honkin’ & Jivin’ at the Palomino (2017)

== Bibliography ==
- Nervous Man Nervous: Big Jay McNeely And The Rise of the Honking Tenor Sax (1995, Jim Dawson, Big Nickel Press) ISBN 978-0936433172
