= Gene Norman Presents an Art Tatum Concert =

Live album by Art Tatum
- Released: 1952
- Recorded: May 1949
- Venue: Shrine Auditorium, Los Angeles
- Genre: Jazz
- Label: Columbia
- Producer: Gene Norman

Gene Norman Presents an Art Tatum Concert is a solo piano album by Art Tatum. It was recorded in concert in 1949 at the Shrine Auditorium in Los Angeles, and was released by Columbia Records in 1952.

== Recording and music ==
The album was recorded during a solo piano concert given by Tatum at the Shrine Auditorium in Los Angeles in May 1949. The concert was promoted by Gene Norman. The material is a typical selection from Tatum's repertoire.

== Release and reception ==
Gene Norman Presents an Art Tatum Concert was released on 10-inch LP by Columbia Records in 1952.

Whitney Balliett wrote: "Tatum is a perfect whole in the 1949 Los Angeles concert. Almost every number has passages to ponder and weep over", and highlighted "an arpeggio, lasting some eight bars, that no other pianist would dare because it is impossible" in "The Man I Love". The Daily Record reviewer described the album as "an outstanding example of the genius that is Art Tatum". A reviewer for The Capital Times wrote: "Applause and auditorium noises give it a live performance atmosphere."

== Track listing ==
Side one

1. "Yesterdays"
2. "Willow Weep for Me"
3. "The Kerry Dance"
4. "The Man I Love"
5. "I Know That You Know"

Side two

1. "Humoresque"
2. "Tatum-Pole Boogie"
3. "Someone to Watch Over Me"
4. "How High the Moon"

== Personnel ==
- Art Tatum – piano
