= Hunter Hancock =

American disc jockey

Hunter Dunagan Hancock (April 21, 1916 – August 4, 2004) was an American disc jockey regarded as the first in the Western United States to play rhythm and blues records on the radio, and among the first to broadcast rock and roll.

He was born in Uvalde, Texas, and raised 90 miles (140 km) away in San Antonio. After schooling, he took on many jobs, including singing in a vaudeville troupe and a stint at a Massachusetts burlesque club. After moving to Los Angeles in the early 1940s he entered radio and was heard on the following stations there: KFVD (1947–1951), KFOX (1951–1954), KFVD/KPOP (1954–1957) and KGFJ (1957–1966). Inspired by local black record store owner John Dolphin of Dolphin's of Hollywood record shop, he called himself "Ol' H.H." He hosted several shows on different stations, often at the same time, including Harlem Holiday, Harlematinee, Huntin' With Hunter and the gospel show Songs of Soul and Spirit.

Hancock became one of the emcees for the famed Cavalcade of Jazz concerts held at Wrigley Field in Los Angeles which were produced by Leon Hefflin Sr. starting with the fifth concert on July 10, 1949. He also emceed for the Cavalcade of Jazz concert held in San Diego at Lane Field on September 3, 1949. Hancock also wrote a column in the Los Angeles Sentinel newspaper. Hancock continued to emcee until the fourteenth Cavalcade of Jazz concert held at the Shrine Auditorium on August 3, 1958. The final Cavalcade of Jazz concert was a tribute to the city's most prominent R&B disc-jockeys of the time as Charles Trammel, Huggy Boy (Dick Hugg) and Jim Randolph teamed up with Hancock for this event. Lionel Hampton, Big Jay McNeely, Dinah Washington, Betty Carter, Billy Eckstine, Jimmy Witherspoon, Louis Jordan, Nat "King" Cole, Louis Armstrong, Count Basie, and Sam Cooke were just a few of the numerous artists that performed over the years at the Cavalcade of Jazz concerts.

Hancock also appeared briefly on the L.A. CBS TV station, KNXT in 1955 with the Friday night show "Rhythm and Bluesville", interviewing such musicians as Duke Ellington, Fats Domino, Little Richard, Gene & Eunice and The Platters.

For several years, the Pulse radio listener survey rated Hancock's shows No. 1 among black listeners in Southern California. In 1950, the Los Angeles Sentinel newspaper rated Hancock the most popular DJ in Los Angeles among blacks. He was also one of the first DJs to play rock and roll music, and landed a cameo spot in a 1957 British rock and roll film called Rock Around the World.

A recreated example of Hancock's program on Los Angeles' former R&B radio station KGFJ can be found on Ron Jacobs' "Cruisin' 1959" (Increase Records INCR 5-2004). This recreation includes several classic R&B songs of that era, contemporary commercials (e.g., Champion spark plugs, the Saturday Evening Post, and others), and DJ patter.

He was convicted in 1962 and sentenced to probation for failing to report $18,000 income on tax forms for 1956–1958. Allegedly, the money was payola from record companies. Hancock believed the money had been given as gifts.

Hancock died aged 88 on August 4, 2004, of natural causes in a retirement home in Claremont, California.
