= KYPA =

Korean-language radio station in Los Angeles

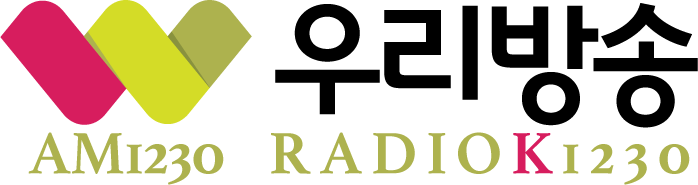
- Los Angeles, California; United States
- Broadcast area: Los Angeles metropolitan area
- Frequency: 1230 kHz
- Branding: AM 1230 JBC

Programming
- Format: Korean
- Affiliations: JBC Radio

Ownership
- Owner: Woori Media Group, LLC

History
- First air date: 1927
- Former call signs: KGFJ (1926–1996)
- Call sign meaning: "Your Personal Achievement"

Technical information
- Licensing authority: FCC
- Facility ID: 18273
- Class: C
- Power: 1,000 watts
- Transmitter coordinates: 34°5′8″N 118°15′27.3″W
- Repeater: 106.3 KALI-HD2 (Santa Ana)

Links
- Public license information: Public file; LMS
- Webcast: Listen live
- Website: radiok1230.com

KYPA (1230 AM, "AM 1230 JBC") is a Korean-language radio station in Los Angeles, California, United States. It is owned by Woori Media Group, LLC.

KYPA is one of four radio stations in the greater Los Angeles area that broadcast entirely in Korean; the others are KMPC, KGBN, and KFOX.

The format includes various shows that serve the largest Korean population in the United States. They include talk shows, newscasts, variety shows, and popular music.

== History ==
KGFJ went on the air in 1926. It is noted for being the first radio station in the United States, and also, in the world to adopt a 24-hour broadcast schedule. In 1950, it became the flagship station for the short-lived Progressive Broadcasting System radio network.

From the 1960s to around 1997, and again in the early 2000s, the programming consisted of R&B, classic soul, and gospel music. For a short time in the late 1970s, after the ratings success of similarly-formatted KDAY, the call letters were changed to KKTT, "The Cat," in an attempt to modernize KGFJ's image. During the Los Angeles riots in 1992, KGFJ briefly adopted a talk format. During the 1960s and early 1970s, KGFJ was a well-respected and influential soul music outlet, with many top name DJs, including Hunter Hancock, Lucky Pierre, Larry McCormick and the Magnificent Montague. KGFJ also had a popular Sunday morning talk show called, "Pat's Points", hosted by Pat (Patricia) Newman (1935–1981), which featured guests. Among the many personalities heard on the station in the 1960s were Johnny Magnus, Rudy Harvey, Herman Griffith, Curtis Troupe, Jim Randolph, Tom Reed, Roland Bynum [who replaced Montague when he retired, as Soulfinger], Frankie Crocker, Johnny Soul (Ron Samuels) and Russ O'Hara. KGFJ's studios were located on Melrose near the Hollywood Freeway overpass (the building has since been demolished).

A recreated example of KGFJ's R&B programming in the late 1950s can be found on Ron Jacobs' "Cruisin' 1959" (Increase Records INCR 5-2004). This recreation features DJ Hunter Hancock and includes several classic R&B songs of that era, contemporary commercials (e.g., Champion spark plugs, the Saturday Evening Post, and others), and DJ patter.

The call sign was changed to KKTT on October 10, 1977. The KGFJ call sign returned on October 15, 1979.

Between the two eras of black-oriented formats, KGFJ was KYPA, "Your Personal Achievement" radio. The station, as well as AM 820 in Chicago, aired mainly recorded content from motivational speakers, including condensed seminar speeches and interviews with business executives. In 2002, the current format was adopted.

In 2009, the station disconnected from its roof-top antenna (which retains significance as likely the last "hammock" (T-wire, "T" wire) style antenna in the U.S.), and moved the transmitter to a site northwest of Dodger Stadium, using two of the towers in the six-tower array of co-owned KBLA.

KYPA is one of only two stations on 1230 kHz in the United States to use a directional antenna during daytime hours. It is also directional at night.

As of August 2020, KYPA expanded its reach using FM frequencies in four other counties in Southern California: Orange, Irvine, Ventura and Kern Counties.
