= Rochell & the Candles =

R&B group from Los Angeles (1950s–1964)

- Genres: R&B
- Years active: Late 1950s to circa 1964
- Labels: Swingin', Challenge
- Past members: Rochell Henderson; Johnny Wyatt; Melvin Sasso; T.C. Henderson

Rochell & the Candles were a one hit wonder group from Los Angeles California. They had a hit in 1961 with "Once Upon A Time".

== Background ==
The group came together in 1958 in Los Angeles. The line up of all males then was Rochell Henderson who sang lead and tenor, Johnny Wyatt who was lead and first tenor, Melvin Sasso who was tenor, and T.C. Henderson who sang bass. The two Hendersons who both came from Louisiana were not related. Rochell Henderson was once in a group called The Chosen Gospel singers which included Lou Rawls.

Their hit "Once Upon a Time" made it to number 20 in the R&B charts and number 26 in the pop charts. It spent a total of thirteen weeks in the pop charts.

In July, 1962, they released "Each Night" bw "Turn Her Down" on Challenge 9158. The A side was composed by Willie Morris and the B side by K. C. Reeth and Robt. J. Hafner.

Their hit appears on the 16 All Time Great Rare Original Oldies various artists compilation issued on Del-Fi Records.

== Later years ==
Between 1966 and 1967, Johnny Wyatt had some solo singles released on the Bronco label. He died in 1983.

== Discography (USA) ==
Singles
Act	Title	Catalogue	Year	Notes #
Rochell and the Candles with Johnny Wyatt	"Once Upon a Time" / "When My Baby is Gone"	Swingin' 45-623	1960	
Rochell and the Candles featuring Johnny Wyatt	"So Far Away" / "Hey Pretty Baby"	Swingin' 45-634	1961	
Rochell & the Candles with Johnny Wyatt	"Each Night" / "Turn Her Down"	Challenge 9158	1962	
Rochell and the Candles with Johnny Wyatt	"Beg Of My Heart" / "Squat With Me, Baby"	Swingin' 45-640	1962	
Rochell & the Candles With Johnny Wyatt	"Let's Run Away And Get Married" / "Annie's Not An Orphan Anymore"	Challenge 9191	1963	
Rochell and the Candles Featuring Johnny Wyatt	"A Long Time Ago" / "Big Boy Pete"	Swingin' 45-652	1964	
The Quin-Tones Rochell & the Candles	"Down The Aisle Of Love" / "Once Upon A Time"	Goldisc G 3091	1979	Rochell & the Candles = Side B
Kathy Young Rochelle & the Candles	"A Thousand Stars" / "Once Upon A Time"	Collectables COL 3039		Rochell & the Candles = Side B
Rochell & the Candles Patti LaBelle & the Bluebells	"Once Upon A Time" / "Impossible"	Trip TR-173		Also issued on Trip Oldies TR-173
Rochelle and the Candles The Royaltones	"Once Upon A Time" / "Flamingo Express"	Collectables COL 3978		

Albums
Act	Title	Catalogue	Year	Notes #
Rochell & the Candles	The Best Of Rochell And The Candles	Swingin' SW-1000		
