= Billboard Year-End Hot 100 singles of 1969 =

Ranking of recorded music

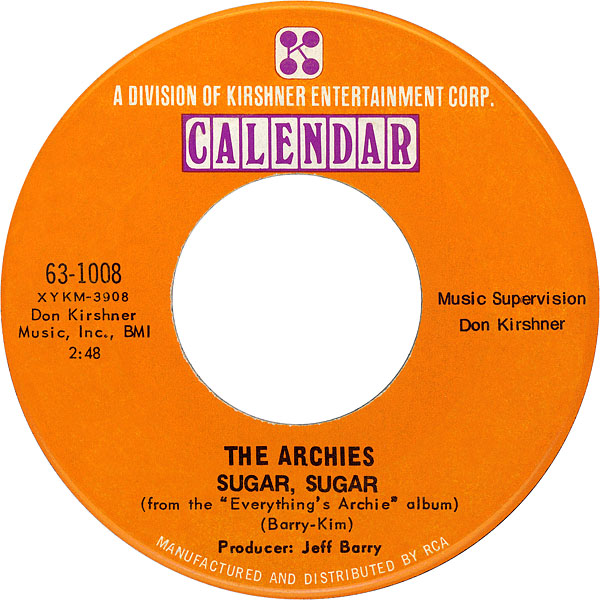
"Sugar, Sugar" by The Archies was the number one song of 1969.

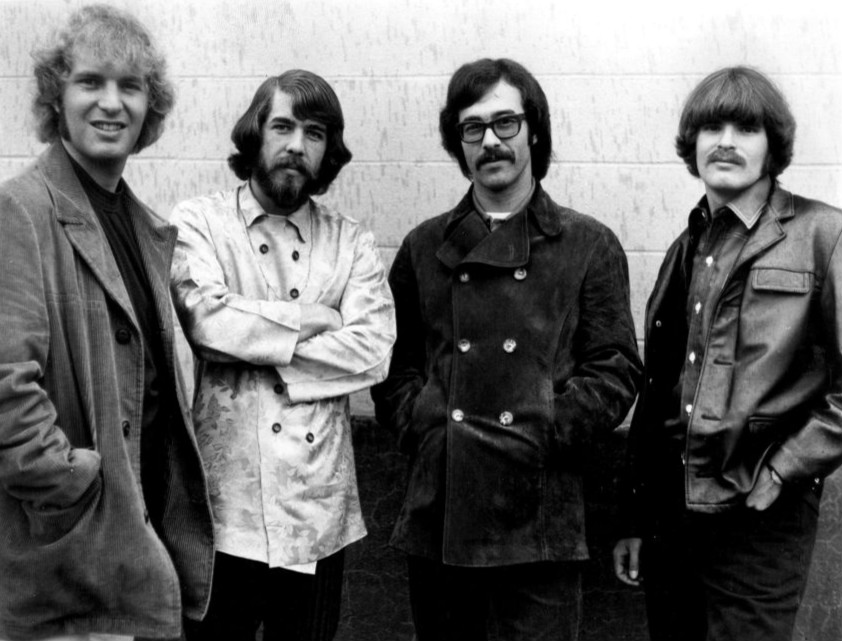
Creedence Clearwater Revival had three songs on the Year-End Hot 100.

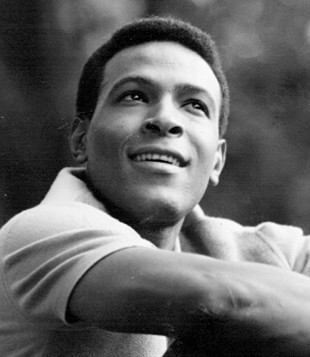
Marvin Gaye had three songs on the Year-End Hot 100.

This is a list of Billboard magazine's Top Hot 100 songs of 1969. The Top 100, as revealed in the year-end edition of Billboard dated December 27, 1969, is based on Hot 100 charts from the issue dates of January 4 through December 13, 1969.

No.	Title	Artist(s)
1	"Sugar, Sugar"	The Archies
2	"Aquarius/Let the Sunshine In"	The 5th Dimension
3	"I Can't Get Next to You"	The Temptations
4	"Honky Tonk Women"	The Rolling Stones
5	"Everyday People"	Sly and the Family Stone
6	"Dizzy"	Tommy Roe
7	"Hot Fun in the Summertime"	Sly and the Family Stone
8	"I'll Never Fall in Love Again"	Tom Jones
9	"Build Me Up Buttercup"	The Foundations
10	"Crimson and Clover"	Tommy James and the Shondells
11	"One"	Three Dog Night
12	"Crystal Blue Persuasion"	Tommy James and the Shondells
13	"Hair"	The Cowsills
14	"Too Busy Thinking About My Baby"	Marvin Gaye
15	"Love Theme from Romeo and Juliet"	Henry Mancini
16	"Get Together"	The Youngbloods
17	"Grazing in the Grass"	The Friends of Distinction
18	"Suspicious Minds"	Elvis Presley
19	"Proud Mary"	Creedence Clearwater Revival
20	"What Does It Take (To Win Your Love)"	Jr. Walker & The All Stars
21	"It's Your Thing"	The Isley Brothers
22	"Sweet Caroline"	Neil Diamond
23	"Jean"	Oliver
24	"Bad Moon Rising"	Creedence Clearwater Revival
25	"Get Back"	The Beatles with Billy Preston
26	"In the Year 2525"	Zager & Evans
27	"Spinning Wheel"	Blood, Sweat & Tears
28	"Baby, I Love You"	Andy Kim
29	"Going in Circles"	The Friends of Distinction
30	"Hurt So Bad"	The Lettermen
31	"Green River"	Creedence Clearwater Revival
32	"My Cherie Amour"	Stevie Wonder
33	"Easy to Be Hard"	Three Dog Night
34	"Baby It's You"	Smith
35	"In the Ghetto"	Elvis Presley
36	"A Boy Named Sue"	Johnny Cash
37	"Baby, Baby Don't Cry"	The Miracles
38	"Only the Strong Survive"	Jerry Butler
39	"Time of the Season"	The Zombies
40	"Wedding Bell Blues"	The 5th Dimension
41	"Little Woman"	Bobby Sherman
42	"Love (Can Make You Happy)"	Mercy
43	"Good Morning Starshine"	Oliver
44	"These Eyes"	The Guess Who
45	"You've Made Me So Very Happy"	Blood, Sweat & Tears
46	"Put a Little Love in Your Heart"	Jackie DeShannon
47	"Do Your Thing"	Charles Wright & the Watts 103rd Street Rhythm Band
48	"I'd Wait a Million Years"	The Grass Roots
49	"Touch Me"	The Doors
50	"More Today Than Yesterday"	Spiral Starecase
51	"I've Gotta Be Me"	Sammy Davis Jr.
52	"Lay Lady Lay"	Bob Dylan
53	"Atlantis"	Donovan
54	"Traces"	Classics IV
55	"It's Getting Better"	"Mama" Cass Elliot
56	"This Magic Moment"	Jay and the Americans
57	"Runaway Child, Running Wild"	The Temptations
58	"Hawaii Five-O"	The Ventures
59	"Galveston"	Glen Campbell
60	"I'm Gonna Make You Mine"	Lou Christie
61	"Gitarzan"	Ray Stevens
62	"Can I Change My Mind"	Tyrone Davis
63	"Time Is Tight"	Booker T. & the M.G.'s
64	"This Girl's in Love With You"	Dionne Warwick
65	"Color Him Father"	The Winstons
66	"Black Pearl"	Checkmates, Ltd.
67	"Indian Giver"	1910 Fruitgum Company
68	"Mother Popcorn"	James Brown
69	"Twenty-Five Miles"	Edwin Starr
70	"Things I'd Like to Say"	New Colony Six
71	"When I Die"	Motherlode
72	"That's the Way Love Is"	Marvin Gaye
73	"Everybody's Talkin'"	Harry Nilsson
74	"Worst That Could Happen"	The Brooklyn Bridge
75	"The Chokin' Kind"	Joe Simon
76	"Smile a Little Smile for Me"	The Flying Machine
77	"Polk Salad Annie"	Tony Joe White
78	"Ruby, Don't Take Your Love to Town"	Kenny Rogers and The First Edition
79	"Games People Play"	Joe South
80	"You Showed Me"	The Turtles
81	"Tracy"	The Cuff Links
82	"Oh, What a Night"	The Dells
83	"Something"	The Beatles
84	"This Girl Is a Woman Now"	Gary Puckett & The Union Gap
85	"Come Together"	The Beatles
86	"Ramblin' Gamblin' Man"	Bob Seger System
87	"I'm Gonna Make You Love Me"	The Supremes & The Temptations
88	"I Heard It Through the Grapevine"	Marvin Gaye
89	"Gimme Gimme Good Lovin'"	Crazy Elephant
90	"Hang 'Em High"	Booker T. & the M.G.'s
91	"Your Good Thing (Is About to End)"	Lou Rawls
92	"Baby, I'm for Real"	The Originals
93	"Oh Happy Day"	Edwin Hawkins Singers
94	"Love Me Tonight"	Tom Jones
95	"Mr. Sun, Mr. Moon"	Paul Revere & the Raiders
96	"Laughing"	The Guess Who
97	"My Whole World Ended (The Moment You Left Me)"	David Ruffin
98	"Soul Deep"	The Box Tops
99	"Hooked on a Feeling"	B.J. Thomas
100	"Let Me"	Paul Revere & the Raiders
100	"Sweet Cream Ladies"	The Box Tops

== See also ==
- 1969 in music
- List of Billboard Hot 100 number-one singles of 1969
- List of Billboard Hot 100 top-ten singles in 1969
