= List of Billboard Hot 100 top-ten singles in 1969 =

This is a list of singles that have peaked in the Top 10 of the Billboard Hot 100 during 1969.

Creedence Clearwater Revival, The Beatles, The Temptations, and Diana Ross & the Supremes each had four top-ten hits in 1969, tying them for the most top-ten hits during the year.

== Top-ten singles ==
- (#) – 1969 Year-end top 10 single position and rank

Top ten entry date	Single	Artist(s)	Peak	Peak date	Weeks in top ten
Singles from 1968
November 23	"Wichita Lineman"	Glen Campbell	3	January 11	9
December 28	"I'm Gonna Make You Love Me"	Diana Ross & the Supremes and The Temptations	2	January 11	8
December 28	"Cloud Nine"	The Temptations	6	January 4	3
Singles from 1969
January 4	"Soulful Strut"	Young-Holt Unlimited	3	January 18	5
January 4	"Hooked on a Feeling"	B. J. Thomas	5	January 11	5
January 11	"Crimson and Clover" (#10)	Tommy James and the Shondells	1	February 1	11
January 18	"Worst That Could Happen"	The Brooklyn Bridge	3	February 1	7
January 18	"Touch Me"	The Doors	3	February 15	8
January 18	"Son of a Preacher Man"	Dusty Springfield	10	January 18	2
January 25	"Everyday People" (#5)	Sly and the Family Stone	1	February 15	9
January 25	"I Started a Joke"	Bee Gees	6	February 8	3
February 1	"Build Me Up Buttercup" (#9)	The Foundations	3	February 22	8
February 8	"Can I Change My Mind"	Tyrone Davis	5	February 22	3
February 8	"Hang 'Em High"	Booker T. & the M.G.'s	9	February 8	2
February 15	"You Showed Me"	The Turtles	6	March 1	3
February 22	"Proud Mary"	Creedence Clearwater Revival	2	March 8	7
February 22	"This Magic Moment"	Jay and the Americans	6	March 8	4
February 22	"I'm Livin' in Shame"	Diana Ross & the Supremes	10	February 22	1
March 1	"Dizzy" (#6)	Tommy Roe	1	March 15	9
March 1	"Baby, Baby Don't Cry"	Smokey Robinson & The Miracles	8	March 1	2
March 8	"This Girl's in Love with You"	Dionne Warwick	7	March 8	3
March 8	"Indian Giver"	1910 Fruitgum Company	5	March 22	4
March 15	"Traces"	Classics IV	2	March 29	4
March 15	"Time of the Season"	The Zombies	3	March 29	6
March 22	"Runaway Child, Running Wild"	The Temptations	6	March 29	4
March 29	"Aquarius/Let the Sunshine In" (#2)	The 5th Dimension	1	April 12	11
March 29	"Galveston"	Glen Campbell	4	April 12	6
March 29	"Only the Strong Survive"	Jerry Butler	4	April 19	6
March 29	"My Whole World Ended (The Moment You Left Me)"	David Ruffin	9	March 29	2
April 5	"You've Made Me So Very Happy"	Blood, Sweat & Tears	2	April 12	6
April 12	"It's Your Thing"	The Isley Brothers	2	May 3	7
April 12	"Hair"	The Cowsills	2	May 10	8
April 12	"Twenty-Five Miles"	Edwin Starr	6	April 26	3
April 19	"Rock Me"	Steppenwolf	10	April 19	1
April 26	"Time Is Tight"	Booker T. & the M.G.'s	6	May 3	3
April 26	"Sweet Cherry Wine"	Tommy James and the Shondells	7	May 3	3
May 3	"Hawaii Five-O"	The Ventures	4	May 10	3
May 3	"The Boxer"	Simon & Garfunkel	7	May 17	4
May 10	"Get Back" †	The Beatles with Billy Preston	1	May 24	9
May 10	"Atlantis"	Donovan	7	May 24	4
May 17	"Love (Can Make You Happy)"	Mercy	2	May 31	6
May 17	"These Eyes"	The Guess Who	6	May 31	5
May 17	"Gitarzan"	Ray Stevens	8	May 31	3
May 24	"Oh Happy Day"	Edwin Hawkins Singers	4	May 31	4
May 31	"Grazing in the Grass"	The Friends of Distinction	3	June 7	5
May 31	"In the Ghetto"	Elvis Presley	3	June 14	5
June 7	"Love Theme from Romeo and Juliet"	Henry Mancini	1	June 28	8
June 7	"Bad Moon Rising"	Creedence Clearwater Revival	2	June 28	6
June 7	"Too Busy Thinking About My Baby"	Marvin Gaye	4	June 28	5
June 14	"One"	Three Dog Night	5	June 28	7
June 21	"Spinning Wheel"	Blood, Sweat & Tears	2	July 5	7
June 21	"Good Morning Starshine"	Oliver	3	July 12	6
June 28	"Israelites"	Desmond Dekker & The Aces	9	June 28	1
July 5	"In the Year 2525 (Exordium & Terminus)"	Zager and Evans	1	July 12	9
July 5	"Crystal Blue Persuasion"	Tommy James and the Shondells	2	July 26	9
July 5	"Color Him Father"	The Winstons	7	July 19	3
July 12	"What Does It Take (To Win Your Love)"	Junior Walker & the All Stars	4	August 9	6
July 12	"The Ballad of John and Yoko"	The Beatles	8	July 12	4
July 19	"My Cherie Amour"	Stevie Wonder	4	July 26	5
July 26	"Baby, I Love You"	Andy Kim	9	July 26	4
August 2	"Honky Tonk Women" (#4)	The Rolling Stones	1	August 23	11
August 2	"Sweet Caroline"	Neil Diamond	4	August 16	6
August 2	"Ruby, Don't Take Your Love to Town"	Kenny Rogers and The First Edition	6	August 2	3
August 9	"A Boy Named Sue"	Johnny Cash	2	August 23	7
August 9	"Put a Little Love in Your Heart"	Jackie DeShannon	4	August 30	6
August 23	"Green River"	Creedence Clearwater Revival	2	September 27	8
August 23	"Get Together"	The Youngbloods	5	September 6	5
August 23	"Polk Salad Annie"	Tony Joe White	8	August 23	1
August 23	"Laughing"	The Guess Who	10	August 23	1
August 30	"Sugar, Sugar" (#1)	The Archies	1	September 20	12
August 30	"Lay Lady Lay"	Bob Dylan	7	September 6	3
September 6	"Easy to Be Hard"	Three Dog Night	4	September 27	7
September 6	"I'll Never Fall in Love Again" (#8)	Tom Jones	6	September 13	4
September 13	"I Can't Get Next to You" (#3)	The Temptations	1	October 18	11
September 20	"Jean"	Oliver	2	October 4	7
September 20	"Little Woman"	Bobby Sherman	3	October 4	7
September 27	"Hot Fun in the Summertime" (#7)	Sly and the Family Stone	2	October 18	7
September 27	"Oh, What a Night"	The Dells	10	September 27	2
October 4	"Everybody's Talkin'"	Nilsson	6	October 11	2
October 11	"This Girl Is a Woman Now"	Gary Puckett & The Union Gap	9	October 11	1
October 18	"Suspicious Minds"	Elvis Presley	1	November 1	6
October 18	"Wedding Bell Blues"	The 5th Dimension	1	November 8	8
October 18	"That's the Way Love Is"	Marvin Gaye	7	October 18	1
October 18	"Tracy"	The Cuff Links	9	October 25	3
October 25	"Baby It's You"	Smith	5	November 1	4
October 25	"I'm Gonna Make You Mine"	Lou Christie	10	October 25	1
November 1	"Come Together" / "Something"	The Beatles	1	November 29	9
November 8	"And When I Die"	Blood, Sweat & Tears	2	November 29	7
November 8	"Something"	The Beatles	3	November 15	3
November 8	"Smile a Little Smile for Me"	The Flying Machine	5	November 22	4
November 15	"Take a Letter Maria"	R. B. Greaves	2	November 22	7
November 22	"Na Na Hey Hey Kiss Him Goodbye"	Steam	1	December 6	8
November 22	"Yester-Me, Yester-You, Yesterday"	Stevie Wonder	7	December 13	5
November 29	"Leaving on a Jet Plane"	Peter, Paul and Mary	1	December 20	10
November 29	"Down on the Corner" / "Fortunate Son"	Creedence Clearwater Revival	3	December 20	8
November 29	"Eli's Comin'"	Three Dog Night	10	November 29	2
December 6	"Someday We'll Be Together"	Diana Ross & the Supremes	1	December 27	9
December 13	"Backfield in Motion"	Mel and Tim	10	December 13	1
December 20	"Holly Holy"	Neil Diamond	6	December 27	3

† — "Get Back" also made its Hot 100 debut on May 10.

=== 1968 peaks ===
List of Billboard Hot 100 top ten singles in 1969 which peaked in 1968
Top ten entry date	Single	Artist(s)	Peak	Peak date	Weeks in top ten
November 2	"Love Child"	Diana Ross & The Supremes	1	November 30	11
November 16	"Who's Making Love"	Johnnie Taylor	5	December 7	8
November 30	"For Once in My Life"	Stevie Wonder	2	December 28	8
December 7	"I Heard It Through the Grapevine"	Marvin Gaye	1	December 14	11
December 7	"Stormy"	Classics IV	5	December 28	5
December 14	"I Love How You Love Me"	Bobby Vinton	9	December 14	4

=== 1970 peaks ===
List of Billboard Hot 100 top ten singles in 1969 which peaked in 1970
Top ten entry date	Single	Artist(s)	Peak	Peak date	Weeks in top ten
December 13	"Raindrops Keep Fallin' on My Head"	B. J. Thomas	1	January 3	13
December 27	"I Want You Back"	The Jackson 5	1	January 31	9
December 27	"Whole Lotta Love"	Led Zeppelin	4	January 31	7

== See also ==
- 1969 in music
- List of Billboard Hot 100 number ones of 1969
- Billboard Year-End Hot 100 singles of 1969
