= List of Cash Box Top 100 number-one singles of 1969 =

These are the number-one singles of 1969 according to the Top 100 Singles chart in Cashbox magazine.

| Issue date | Song | Artist |
|---|---|---|
| January 4 | "I Heard It Through the Grapevine" | Marvin Gaye |
| January 11 | "I Heard It Through the Grapevine" | Marvin Gaye |
| January 18 | "I Heard It Through the Grapevine" | Marvin Gaye |
| January 25 | "I'm Gonna Make You Love Me" | Diana Ross & the Supremes and The Temptations |
| February 1 | "Crimson and Clover" | Tommy James & the Shondells |
| February 8 | "Touch Me" | The Doors |
| February 15 | "Everyday People" | Sly & the Family Stone |
| February 22 | "Everyday People" | Sly & the Family Stone |
| March 1 | "Build Me Up Buttercup" | The Foundations |
| March 8 | "Build Me Up Buttercup" | The Foundations |
| March 15 | "Dizzy" | Tommy Roe |
| March 22 | "Dizzy" | Tommy Roe |
| March 29 | "Time of the Season" | The Zombies |
| April 5 | "Aquarius/Let the Sunshine In (The Flesh Failures)" | The 5th Dimension |
| April 12 | "Aquarius/Let the Sunshine In (The Flesh Failures)" | The 5th Dimension |
| April 19 | "Aquarius/Let the Sunshine In (The Flesh Failures)" | The 5th Dimension |
| April 26 | "Aquarius/Let the Sunshine In (The Flesh Failures)" | The 5th Dimension |
| May 3 | "Aquarius/Let the Sunshine In (The Flesh Failures)" | The 5th Dimension |
| May 10 | "Hair" | The Cowsills |
| May 17 | "Hair" | The Cowsills |
| May 24 | "Get Back" | The Beatles |
| May 31 | "Get Back" | The Beatles |
| June 7 | "Get Back" | The Beatles |
| June 14 | "Get Back" | The Beatles |
| June 21 | "Get Back" | The Beatles |
| June 28 | "In the Ghetto" | Elvis Presley |
| July 5 | "Love Theme from Romeo and Juliet" | Henry Mancini |
| July 12 | "Love Theme from Romeo and Juliet" | Henry Mancini |
| July 19 | "In the Year 2525 (Exordium and Terminus)" | Zager and Evans |
| July 26 | "In the Year 2525 (Exordium and Terminus)" | Zager and Evans |
| August 2 | "In the Year 2525 (Exordium and Terminus)" | Zager and Evans |
| August 9 | "In the Year 2525 (Exordium and Terminus)" | Zager and Evans |
| August 16 | "Honky Tonk Women" | The Rolling Stones |
| August 23 | "Honky Tonk Women" | The Rolling Stones |
| August 30 | "Honky Tonk Women" | The Rolling Stones |
| September 6 | "Honky Tonk Women" | The Rolling Stones |
| September 13 | "Sugar, Sugar" | The Archies |
| September 20 | "Sugar, Sugar" | The Archies |
| September 27 | "Sugar, Sugar" | The Archies |
| October 4 | "Sugar, Sugar" | The Archies |
| October 11 | "Little Woman" | Bobby Sherman |
| October 18 | "Suspicious Minds" | Elvis Presley |
| October 25 | "Suspicious Minds" | Elvis Presley |
| November 1 | "Wedding Bell Blues" | The 5th Dimension |
| November 8 | "Wedding Bell Blues" | The 5th Dimension |
| November 15 | "Wedding Bell Blues" | The 5th Dimension |
| November 22 | "Come Together" | The Beatles |
| November 29 | "Come Together" | The Beatles |
| December 6 | "Come Together" | The Beatles |
| December 13 | "And When I Die" | Blood, Sweat & Tears |
| December 20 | "Leaving on a Jet Plane" | Peter, Paul and Mary |
| December 27 | "Someday We'll Be Together" | Diana Ross & the Supremes |

== See also ==
- 1969 in music
- List of Hot 100 number-one singles of 1969 (U.S.)
