= List of Billboard Hot 100 top-ten singles in 1970 =

This is a list of singles that have peaked in the Top 10 of the Billboard Hot 100 during 1970.

The Jackson 5 and Creedence Clearwater Revival each had four top-ten hits in 1970, tying them for the most top-ten hits during the year.

== Top-ten singles ==
- (#) – 1970 Year-end top 10 single position and rank

Top ten entry date	Single	Artist(s)	Peak	Peak date	Weeks in top ten
Singles from 1969
December 13	"Raindrops Keep Fallin' on My Head" (#4)	B. J. Thomas	1	January 3	13
December 27	"I Want You Back"	The Jackson 5	1	January 31	9
December 27	"Whole Lotta Love"	Led Zeppelin	4	January 31	7
Singles from 1970
January 3	"Venus"	Shocking Blue	1	February 7	9
January 3	"La La La (If I Had You)"	Bobby Sherman	9	January 10	2
January 10	"Jam Up and Jelly Tight"	Tommy Roe	8	January 17	3
January 17	"Don't Cry Daddy" / "Rubberneckin'"	Elvis Presley	6	January 31	3
January 17	"Midnight Cowboy"	Ferrante & Teicher	10	January 17	1
January 24	"Without Love (There Is Nothing)"	Tom Jones	5	January 31	3
January 24	"I'll Never Fall in Love Again"	Dionne Warwick	6	February 7	4
January 31	"Thank You (Falettinme Be Mice Elf Agin)" / "Everybody Is a Star"	Sly and the Family Stone	1	February 14	7
February 7	"Hey There Lonely Girl"	Eddie Holman	2	February 21	6
February 7	"No Time"	The Guess Who	5	February 28	4
February 7	"Jingle Jangle"	The Archies	10	February 7	1
February 14	"Travelin' Band" / "Who'll Stop The Rain"	Creedence Clearwater Revival	2	March 7	5
February 14	"Psychedelic Shack"	The Temptations	7	February 28	3
February 14	"Arizona"	Mark Lindsay	10	February 14	1
February 21	"Bridge over Troubled Water" (#1)	Simon & Garfunkel	1	February 28	10
February 21	"Rainy Night in Georgia"	Brook Benton	4	March 7	5
February 28	"Ma Belle Amie"	Tee-Set	5	March 14	3
March 7	"The Rapper"	The Jaggerz	2	March 21	6
March 7	"Give Me Just a Little More Time"	Chairmen of the Board	3	March 21	4
March 7	"He Ain't Heavy, He's My Brother"	The Hollies	7	March 21	4
March 14	"Evil Ways"	Santana	9	March 21	2
March 21	"Let It Be" † (#9)	The Beatles	1	April 11	11
March 21	"Instant Karma!"	John Lennon	3	March 28	8
March 21	"Love Grows (Where My Rosemary Goes)"	Edison Lighthouse	5	March 28	7
March 21	"Didn't I (Blow Your Mind This Time)"	The Delfonics	10	March 21	1
March 28	"ABC"	The Jackson 5	1	April 25	9
March 28	"Spirit in the Sky"	Norman Greenbaum	3	April 18	8
March 28	"Come and Get It"	Badfinger	7	April 18	6
April 4	"The House of the Rising Sun"	Frijid Pink	7	April 4	2
April 4	"Easy Come, Easy Go"	Bobby Sherman	9	April 11	2
April 18	"American Woman" / "No Sugar Tonight" (#3)	The Guess Who	1	May 9	8
April 18	"Love or Let Me Be Lonely"	The Friends of Distinction	6	May 2	4
April 18	"Up the Ladder to the Roof"	The Supremes	10	April 18	1
April 25	"Turn Back the Hands of Time"	Tyrone Davis	3	May 23	6
May 2	"Vehicle"	The Ides of March	2	May 23	5
May 9	"Everything Is Beautiful"	Ray Stevens	1	May 30	6
May 9	"Reflections of My Life"	Marmalade	10	May 9	3
May 16	"Cecilia"	Simon & Garfunkel	4	May 30	5
May 16	"Up Around the Bend" / "Run Through the Jungle"	Creedence Clearwater Revival	4	June 6	5
May 23	"Love on a Two-Way Street"	The Moments	3	May 30	5
May 30	"Which Way You Goin' Billy?"	The Poppy Family	2	June 6	5
May 30	"The Letter"	Joe Cocker	7	May 30	4
June 6	"The Long and Winding Road" / "For You Blue"	The Beatles	1	June 13	6
June 6	"Get Ready" (#8)	Rare Earth	4	June 13	5
June 6	"Make Me Smile"	Chicago	9	June 6	2
June 13	"The Love You Save"	The Jackson 5	1	June 27	9
June 20	"Mama Told Me (Not to Come)"	Three Dog Night	1	July 11	9
June 20	"Ball of Confusion (That's What the World Is Today)"	The Temptations	3	June 27	9
June 20	"Hitchin' a Ride"	Vanity Fare	5	June 27	4
June 20	"Lay Down (Candles in the Rain)"	Melanie with The Edwin Hawkins Singers	6	July 11	6
June 27	"Ride Captain Ride"	Blues Image	4	July 11	5
June 27	"The Wonder of You" / "Mama Liked the Roses"	Elvis Presley	9	June 27	3
July 4	"Band of Gold" (#10)	Freda Payne	3	July 25	8
July 11	"(They Long to Be) Close to You" (#2)	The Carpenters	1	July 25	11
July 18	"Make It with You"	Bread	1	August 22	10
July 18	"O-o-h Child"	Five Stairsteps	8	July 18	4
July 18	"Gimme Dat Ding"	The Pipkins	9	July 18	1
July 25	"Signed, Sealed, Delivered I'm Yours"	Stevie Wonder	3	August 8	6
August 1	"Spill the Wine"	Eric Burdon and War	3	August 22	7
August 1	"Tighter, Tighter"	Alive N Kickin'	7	August 8	4
August 15	"War" (#5)	Edwin Starr	1	August 29	8
August 15	"In the Summertime"	Mungo Jerry	3	September 12	6
August 22	"Patches"	Clarence Carter	4	September 19	6
August 22	"I Just Can't Help Believing"	B. J. Thomas	9	August 22	1
August 29	"Ain't No Mountain High Enough" (#6)	Diana Ross	1	September 19	9
August 29	"25 or 6 to 4"	Chicago	4	September 12	5
August 29	"(If You Let Me Make Love to You Then) Why Can't I Touch You?"	Ronnie Dyson	8	August 29	2
September 5	"Lookin' Out My Back Door" / "Long As I Can See the Light"	Creedence Clearwater Revival	2	October 3	7
September 12	"Julie, Do Ya Love Me"	Bobby Sherman	5	September 19	6
September 19	"Candida"	Dawn	3	October 3	8
September 26	"Cracklin' Rosie"	Neil Diamond	1	October 10	7
September 26	"(I Know) I'm Losing You"	Rare Earth	7	October 3	3
September 26	"Snowbird"	Anne Murray	8	September 26	2
October 3	"I'll Be There" (#7)	The Jackson 5	1	October 17	11
October 3	"All Right Now"	Free	4	October 17	6
October 10	"We've Only Just Begun"	The Carpenters	2	October 31	9
October 10	"Green-Eyed Lady"	Sugarloaf	3	October 17	8
October 17	"Fire and Rain"	James Taylor	3	October 31	8
October 24	"Indiana Wants Me"	R. Dean Taylor	5	November 7	6
October 24	"Lola"	The Kinks	9	October 24	3
October 31	"It's Only Make Believe"	Glen Campbell	10	October 31	1
November 7	"I Think I Love You"	The Partridge Family	1	November 21	11
November 14	"The Tears of a Clown"	Smokey Robinson & The Miracles	1	December 12	10
November 14	"Gypsy Woman"	Brian Hyland	3	December 5	8
November 14	"Somebody's Been Sleeping"	100 Proof (Aged in Soul)	8	November 14	2
November 14	"It Don't Matter to Me"	Bread	10	November 14	1
November 21	"Montego Bay"	Bobby Bloom	8	November 28	2
November 28	"Heaven Help Us All"	Stevie Wonder	9	November 28	2
December 5	"One Less Bell to Answer"	The 5th Dimension	2	December 26	10
December 5	"No Matter What"	Badfinger	8	December 5	4
December 5	"Share the Land"	The Guess Who	10	December 5	2
December 12	"My Sweet Lord" / "Isn't It a Pity"	George Harrison	1	December 26	10
December 19	"Stoned Love"	The Supremes	7	December 19	5

† — "Let It Be" also made its Hot 100 debut on March 21.

=== 1969 peaks ===
List of Billboard Hot 100 top ten singles in 1970 which peaked in 1969
Top ten entry date	Single	Artist(s)	Peak	Peak date	Weeks in top ten
November 22	"Na Na Hey Hey Kiss Him Goodbye"	Steam	1	December 6	8
November 29	"Leaving on a Jet Plane"	Peter, Paul and Mary	1	December 20	10
November 29	"Down on the Corner" / "Fortunate Son"	Creedence Clearwater Revival	3	December 20	8
December 6	"Someday We'll Be Together"	Diana Ross & the Supremes	1	December 27	9
December 20	"Holly Holy"	Neil Diamond	6	December 27	3

=== 1971 peaks ===
List of Billboard Hot 100 top ten singles in 1970 which peaked in 1971
Top ten entry date	Single	Artist(s)	Peak	Peak date	Weeks in top ten
December 12	"Black Magic Woman"	Santana	4	January 9	7
December 12	"Does Anybody Really Know What Time It Is?"	Chicago	7	January 2	5
December 19	"Knock Three Times"	Dawn	1	January 23	11

== See also ==
- 1970 in music
- List of Billboard Hot 100 number ones of 1970
- Billboard Year-End Hot 100 singles of 1970
