= Pebbles, Volume 9 (1980 album) =

Compilation album
- Released: 1980
- Recorded: Mid-1960s
- Genre: Garage rock, psychedelic rock
- Label: BFD; AIP

chronology
Pebbles, Volume 8 (LP)	Pebbles, Volume 9	Pebbles, Volume 10 (LP)

Pebbles, Volume 9 is a compilation album among the LPs in the Pebbles series. The music on this album has no relation to Pebbles, Volume 9 that was released on CD many years later.

== Release data ==
This album was released as an LP by BFD Records in 1980 (as #BFD-5026) and was kept in print for many years by AIP Records.

== Notes on the tracks ==
The Outsiders had several hits in this time period, including "Time Won't Let Me". New Colony Six also had some prominence in the charts following their garage rock beginnings, with hits that include "I Will Always Think About You" and "Things I'd Like to Say". The Gestures' "Run, Run, Run" was one of the biggest hits to ever appear on a Pebbles LP, reaching number 44 on Billboard and number 48 on Cash Box.

== Track listing ==
Side 1:

1. The Free-for-All: "Show Me the Way" (Kevin Colley)
2. Byron & the Mortals: "Do You Believe Me"
3. The Endd: "Out of My Hands"
4. The Knaves: "The Girl I Threw Away"
5. The Bugs: "Pretty Girl"
6. The Bucaneers: "You're Never Gonna Love Me Anymore"
7. The Beckett Quintet: "No Correspondence"
8. The Outsiders: "I'm Not Trying to Hurt You"

Side 2:

1. The Gestures: "Run Run Run" – rel. 1964
2. The Bold: "Gotta Get Some"
3. The Banshees: "Project Blue"
4. New Colony Six: "At the River's Edge" - rel. 1966
5. Beethoven's Fifth: "Come Down" – rel. 1967
6. It's All Meat: "Feel It"
7. The Bad Roads: "Too Bad" - rel. 1966
8. The Bad Roads: "Blue Girl" - rel. 1966
