= List of Billboard Hot 100 number ones of 1969 =

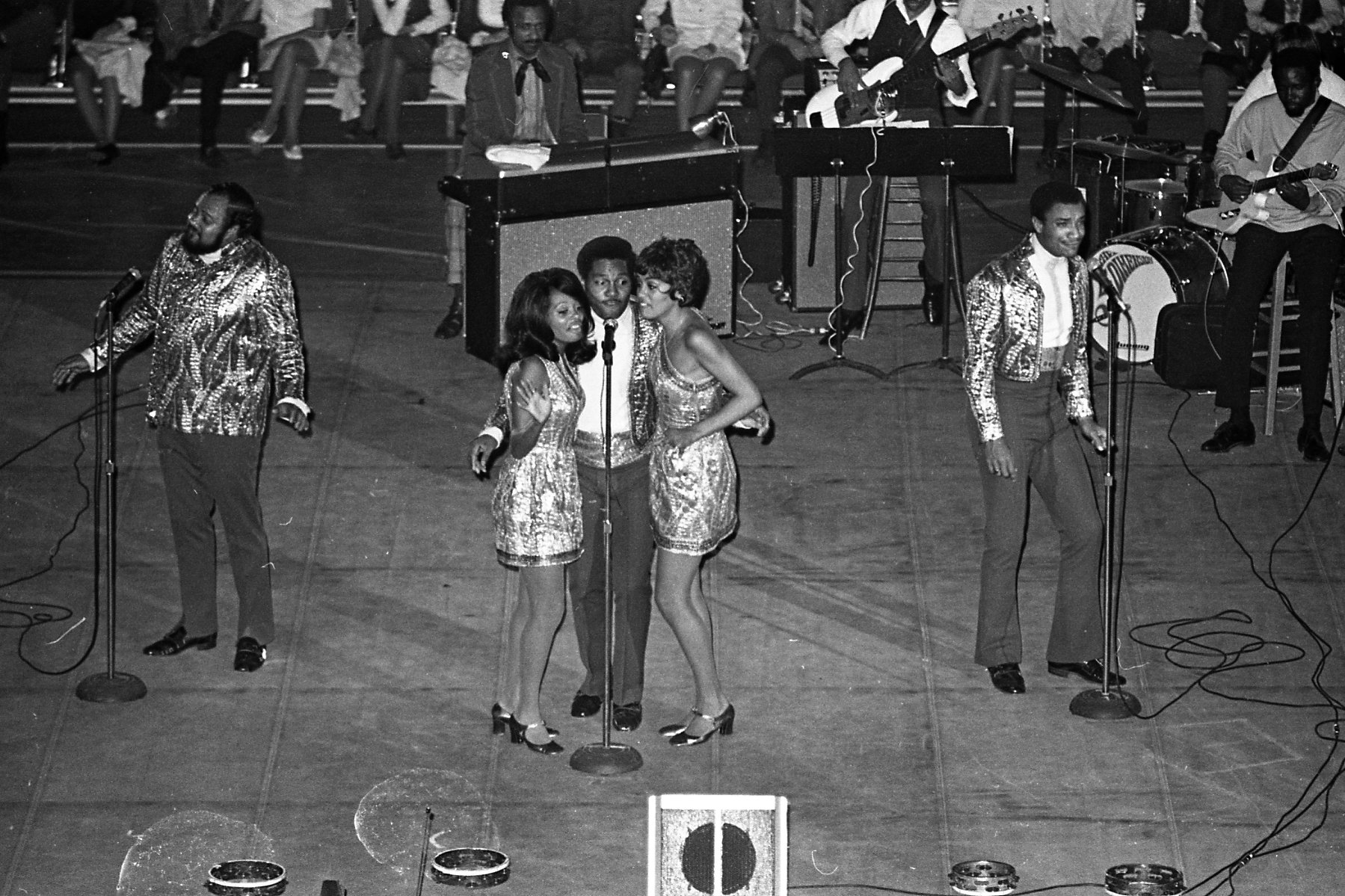
The 5th Dimension had two chart-toppers in 1969.

The Billboard Hot 100 is a chart published since August 1958 by Billboard magazine which ranks the best-performing singles in the United States. In 1969, it was compiled based on a combination of sales and airplay data sourced from surveys of retail outlets and playlists submitted by radio stations respectively. During the year, 17 different singles spent time at number one.

In 1969's first issue of Billboard, "I Heard It Through the Grapevine" by Marvin Gaye was at number one, retaining its position from the final chart of 1968. In February, Sly & the Family Stone topped the chart for the first time with "Everyday People"; the 5th Dimension achieved the same feat in April with "Medley: Aquarius/Let the Sunshine In (The Flesh Failures)", from the soundtrack of the stage musical Hair (1967). The medley topped the Hot 100 for six consecutive weeks, one of two singles during the year to spend six weeks at number one. The 5th Dimension returned to the top spot in November with "Wedding Bell Blues" and was one of only two acts to take more than one single to number one during the year; their total of nine weeks in the top spot was the most achieved by any act in 1969. The group's first number one was replaced in the peak position by "Get Back" by the Beatles with Billy Preston. Other than two re-issued singles on which the Beatles had acted as the backing band for the singer Tony Sheridan prior to their rise to fame, "Get Back" is the only Hot 100 entry on which another musician received joint credit with the band. It was the 17th number one for the Beatles but the first appearance on the Hot 100 for Preston, who went on to achieve two solo chart-toppers. The Beatles returned to number one in November with the double A-sided single "Come Together" / "Something" and were the second act with more than one number one during 1969.

Five more acts gained their first Hot 100 number ones between June and December. The arranger and orchestra leader Henry Mancini, who had regularly charted during the 1960s with film and television themes, reached number one for the first time with "Love Theme from Romeo and Juliet", taken from the 1968 film adaptation of the Shakespeare play directed by Franco Zeffirelli. Zager and Evans spent six weeks at number one in July and August with "In the Year 2525 (Exordium and Terminus)", tying for the year's longest-running chart-topper. Despite this, it was the only single which the duo ever placed on the Hot 100, leaving them viewed as a one-hit wonder. In September, "Sugar, Sugar" was the first Hot 100 number one for the Archies. The group was a fictional one consisting of characters from the animated television series The Archie Show, based on the comic books published by Archie Comics; the male and female vocals on the record were provided by the session singers Ron Dante and Toni Wine respectively. In December, Steam reached number one for the first and only time with "Na Na Hey Hey Kiss Him Goodbye" and Peter, Paul and Mary did the same with "Leaving on a Jet Plane". The year's final number one was "Someday We'll Be Together" by Diana Ross & the Supremes. It was officially the final Supremes single to feature Diana Ross as lead vocalist before she departed for a solo career but was itself effectively a Ross solo single, as Mary Wilson and Cindy Birdsong, the group's other members, did not perform on it and were replaced by session singers.

== Chart history ==
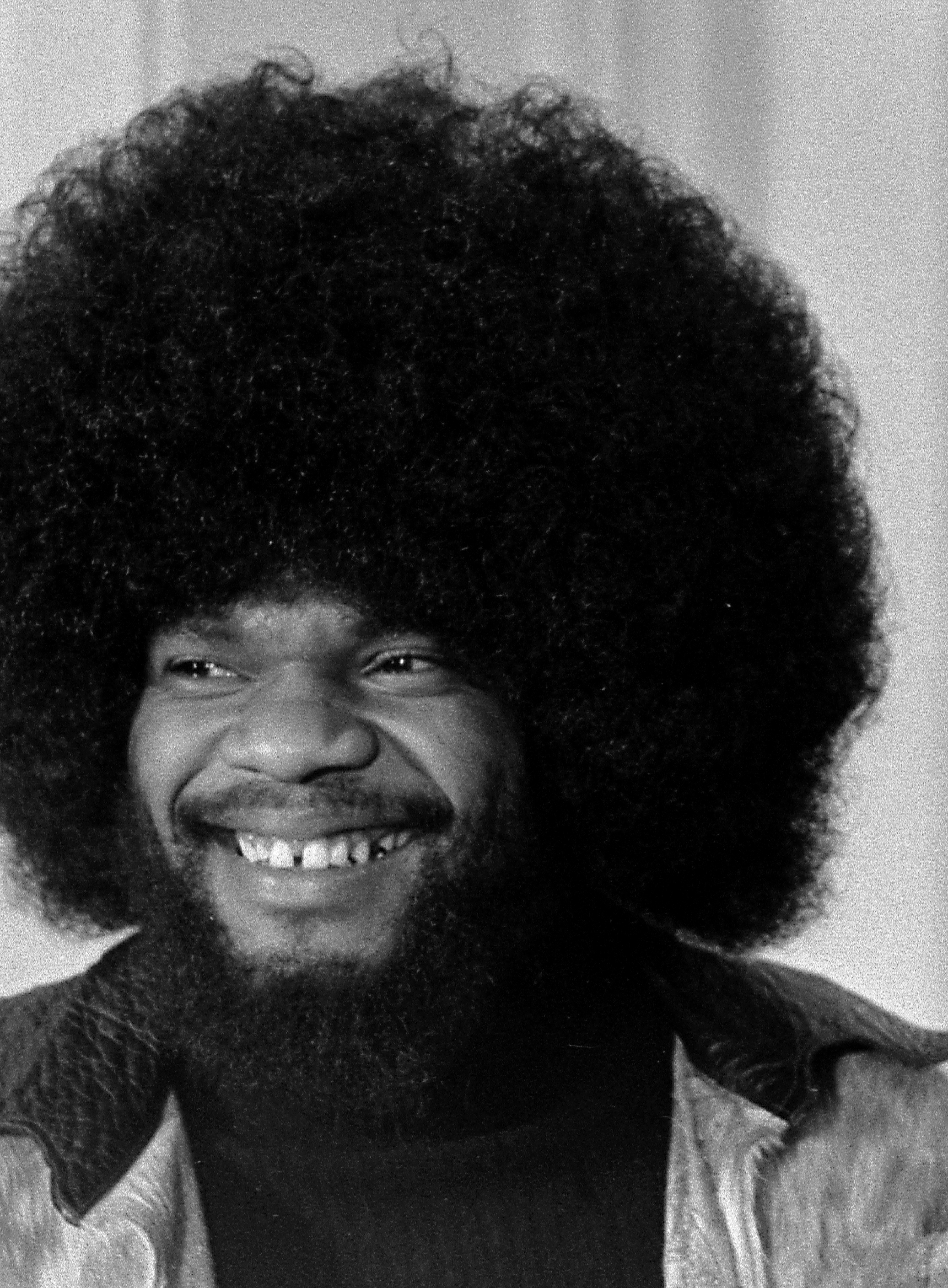
Billy Preston is one of only two musicians to have received joint billing on a Hot 100 entry by the Beatles.

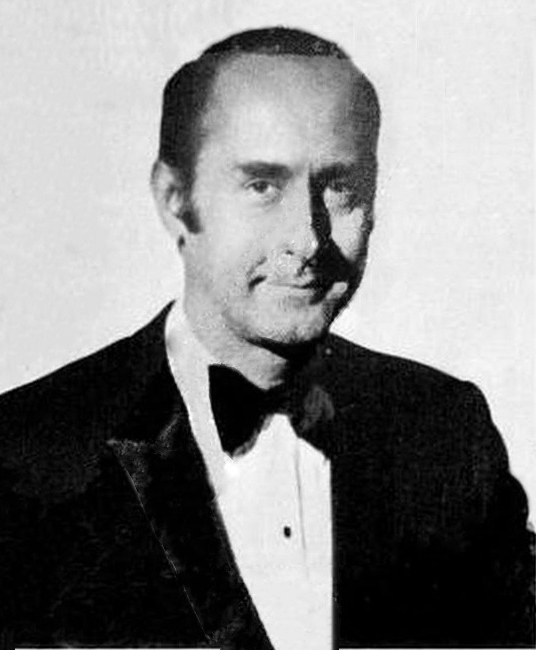
Henry Mancini took "Love Theme from Romeo and Juliet" to number one.

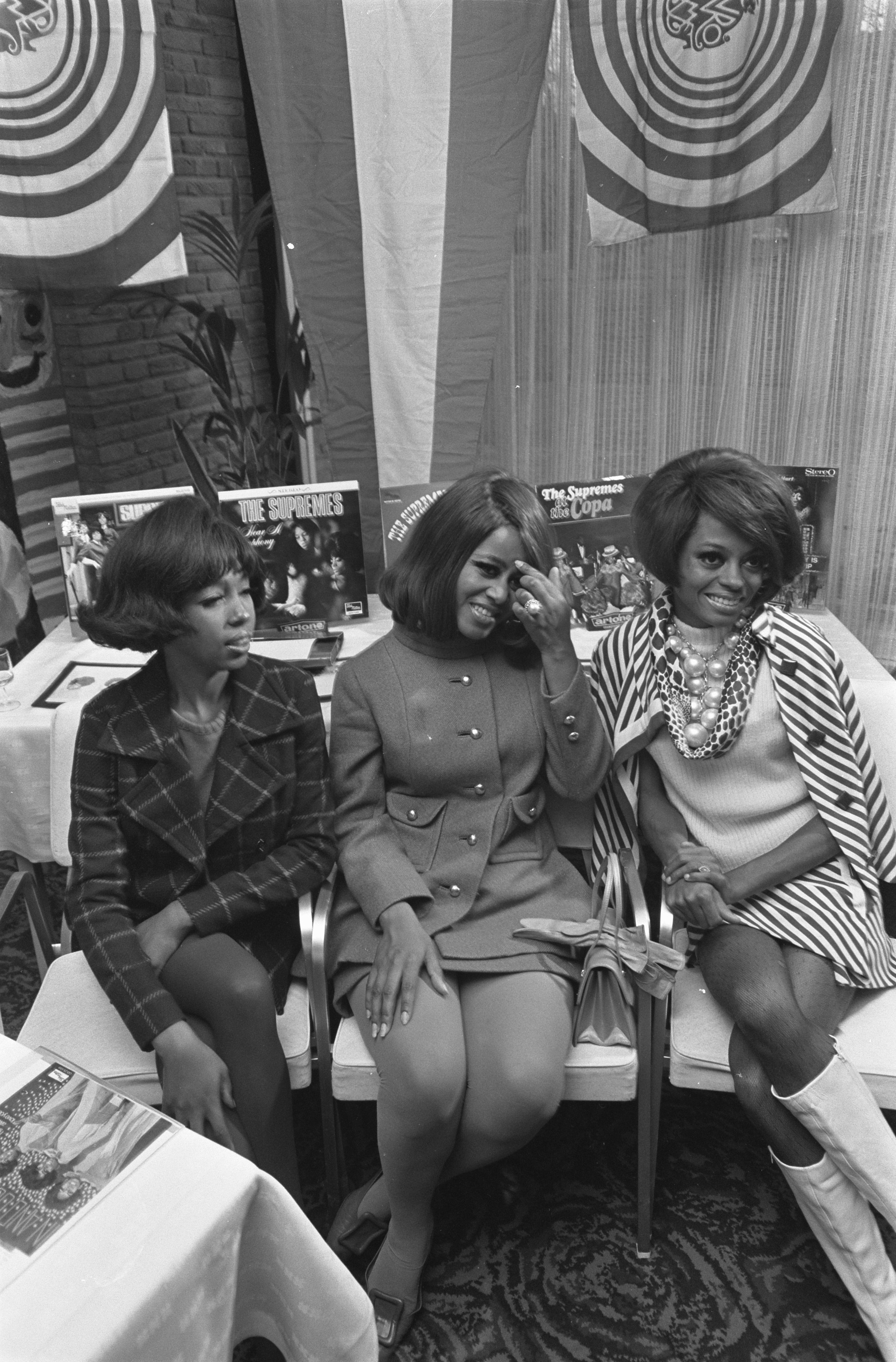
"Someday We'll Be Together" was the final single by the Supremes to feature lead singer Diana Ross (right).

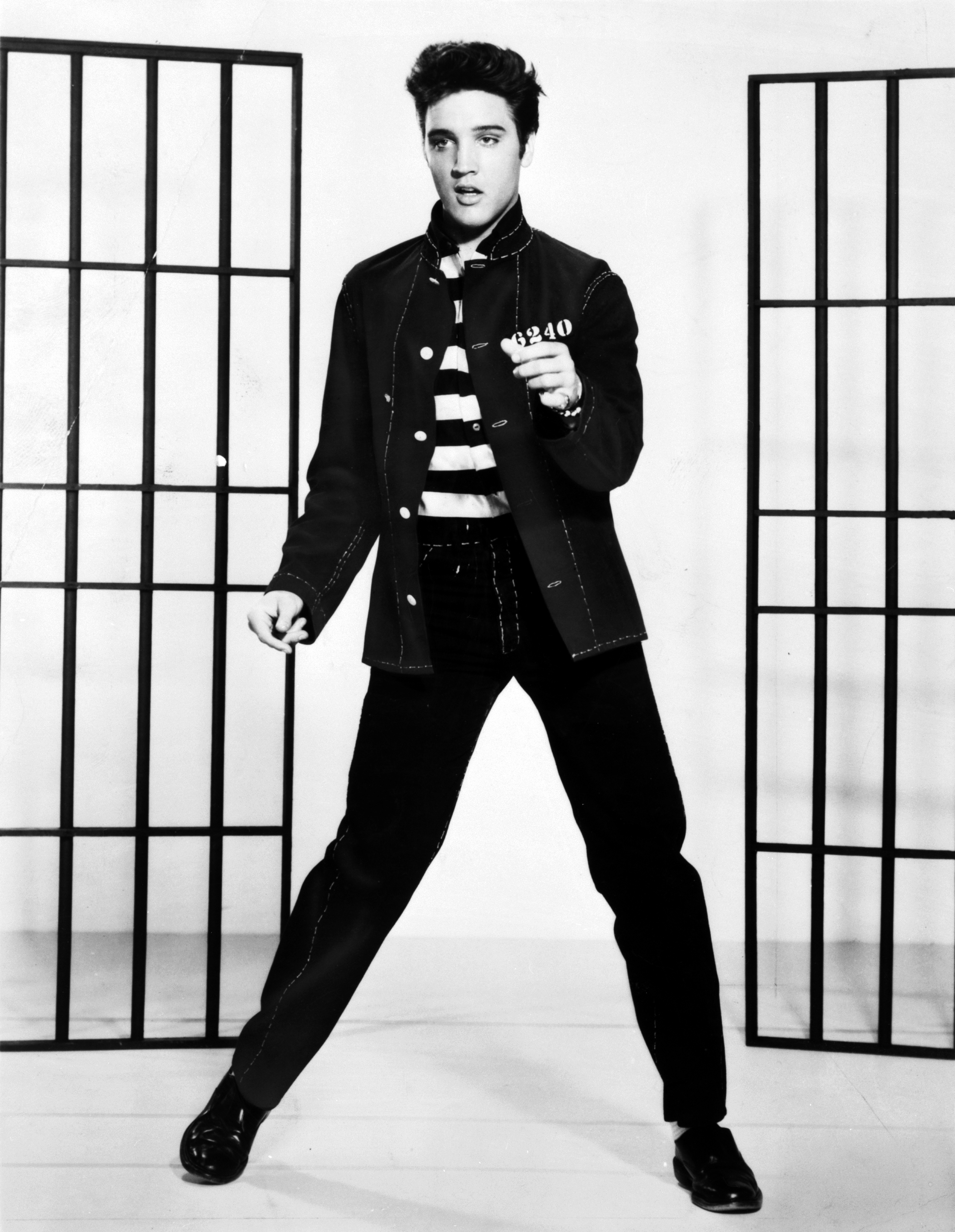
"Suspicious Minds" was the final Hot 100 number one for Elvis Presley.

Chart history
No. (Note: The "No." column indicates the numerical sequence of number ones in Hot 100 history.)	Issue date	Title	Artist(s)	Ref.
210	January 4	"I Heard It Through the Grapevine"	Marvin Gaye	
210	January 11	"I Heard It Through the Grapevine"	Marvin Gaye	
210	January 18	"I Heard It Through the Grapevine"	Marvin Gaye	
210	January 25	"I Heard It Through the Grapevine"	Marvin Gaye	
211	February 1	"Crimson and Clover"	Tommy James and the Shondells	
211	February 8	"Crimson and Clover"	Tommy James and the Shondells	
212	February 15	"Everyday People"	Sly & the Family Stone	
212	February 22	"Everyday People"	Sly & the Family Stone	
212	March 1	"Everyday People"	Sly & the Family Stone	
212	March 8	"Everyday People"	Sly & the Family Stone	
213	March 15	"Dizzy"	Tommy Roe	
213	March 22	"Dizzy"	Tommy Roe	
213	March 29	"Dizzy"	Tommy Roe	
213	April 5	"Dizzy"	Tommy Roe	
214	April 12	"Medley: Aquarius/Let the Sunshine In (The Flesh Failures)"	The 5th Dimension	
214	April 19	"Medley: Aquarius/Let the Sunshine In (The Flesh Failures)"	The 5th Dimension	
214	April 26	"Medley: Aquarius/Let the Sunshine In (The Flesh Failures)"	The 5th Dimension	
214	May 3	"Medley: Aquarius/Let the Sunshine In (The Flesh Failures)"	The 5th Dimension	
214	May 10	"Medley: Aquarius/Let the Sunshine In (The Flesh Failures)"	The 5th Dimension	
214	May 17	"Medley: Aquarius/Let the Sunshine In (The Flesh Failures)"	The 5th Dimension	
215	May 24	"Get Back"	The Beatles with Billy Preston	
215	May 31	"Get Back"	The Beatles with Billy Preston	
215	June 7	"Get Back"	The Beatles with Billy Preston	
215	June 14	"Get Back"	The Beatles with Billy Preston	
215	June 21	"Get Back"	The Beatles with Billy Preston	
216	June 28	"Love Theme from Romeo and Juliet"	Henry Mancini	
216	July 5	"Love Theme from Romeo and Juliet"	Henry Mancini	
217	July 12	"In the Year 2525 (Exordium and Terminus)"	Zager and Evans	
217	July 19	"In the Year 2525 (Exordium and Terminus)"	Zager and Evans	
217	July 26	"In the Year 2525 (Exordium and Terminus)"	Zager and Evans	
217	August 2	"In the Year 2525 (Exordium and Terminus)"	Zager and Evans	
217	August 9	"In the Year 2525 (Exordium and Terminus)"	Zager and Evans	
217	August 16	"In the Year 2525 (Exordium and Terminus)"	Zager and Evans	
218	August 23	"Honky Tonk Women"	The Rolling Stones	
218	August 30	"Honky Tonk Women"	The Rolling Stones	
218	September 6	"Honky Tonk Women"	The Rolling Stones	
218	September 13	"Honky Tonk Women"	The Rolling Stones	
219	September 20	"Sugar, Sugar"	The Archies	
219	September 27	"Sugar, Sugar"	The Archies	
219	October 4	"Sugar, Sugar"	The Archies	
219	October 11	"Sugar, Sugar"	The Archies	
220	October 18	"I Can't Get Next to You"	The Temptations	
220	October 25	"I Can't Get Next to You"	The Temptations	
221	November 1	"Suspicious Minds"	Elvis Presley	
222	November 8	"Wedding Bell Blues"	The 5th Dimension	
222	November 15	"Wedding Bell Blues"	The 5th Dimension	
222	November 22	"Wedding Bell Blues"	The 5th Dimension	
223	November 29	"Come Together" / "Something" (Note: Double A-sided single)	The Beatles	
224	December 6	"Na Na Hey Hey Kiss Him Goodbye"	Steam	
224	December 13	"Na Na Hey Hey Kiss Him Goodbye"	Steam	
225	December 20	"Leaving on a Jet Plane"	Peter, Paul and Mary	
226	December 27	"Someday We'll Be Together"	Diana Ross & the Supremes	

== Number-one artists ==
List of number-one artists by total weeks at number one
Weeks at No. 1	Artist
9	The 5th Dimension
6	Zager and Evans
6	The Beatles
5	Billy Preston
4	Marvin Gaye
4	Sly & the Family Stone
4	Tommy Roe
4	The Rolling Stones
4	The Archies
2	Tommy James and the Shondells
2	Henry Mancini
2	The Temptations
2	Steam
1	Elvis Presley
1	Peter, Paul and Mary
1	Diana Ross & the Supremes

== See also ==
- 1969 in music
- Cashbox Top 100 number-one singles of 1969
- List of Billboard number-one singles
- List of Billboard Hot 100 top-ten singles in 1969
- List of Billboard Hot 100 number-one singles from 1958 to 1969
