= Lists of Billboard Hot 100 top-ten singles =

This is a list of songs that have reached number 10 or higher on the Billboard Hot 100. Introduced in 1958, the Hot 100 is the pre-eminent singles chart in the United States, currently monitoring the most popular singles in terms of popular radio play, single purchases and online streaming.

== Preface ==
The following year-by-year, week-by-week listings are based on statistics accrued by Billboard Magazine since the inception of its Hot 100 popularity chart in August 1958.

All data is pooled from record purchases and radio/jukebox play within the United States. Later charts also include digital single sales, online streaming, and YouTube hits.

== Top-ten singles by year ==
- 1958
- 1959
- 1960
- 1961
- 1962
- 1963
- 1964
- 1965
- 1966
- 1967
- 1968
- 1969
- 1970
- 1971
- 1972
- 1973
- 1974
- 1975
- 1976
- 1977
- 1978
- 1979
- 1980
- 1981
- 1982
- 1983
- 1984
- 1985
- 1986
- 1987
- 1988
- 1989
- 1990
- 1991
- 1992
- 1993
- 1994
- 1995
- 1996
- 1997
- 1998
- 1999
- 2000
- 2001
- 2002
- 2003
- 2004
- 2005
- 2006
- 2007
- 2008
- 2009
- 2010
- 2011
- 2012
- 2013
- 2014
- 2015
- 2016
- 2017
- 2018
- 2019
- 2020
- 2021
- 2022
- 2023
- 2024
- 2025
- 2026

== See also ==
- List of Billboard number-one singles
- Billboard Year-End

== Sources ==
The following sources apply to all "by year" pages linked above:

- Joel Whitburn's Top Pop Singles 1955-2008, 12th Edition (ISBN 0-89820-180-2)
- Joel Whitburn Presents the Billboard Pop Charts, 1955-1959 (ISBN 0-89820-092-X)
- Joel Whitburn Presents the Billboard Hot 100 Charts: The Sixties (ISBN 0-89820-074-1)
- Joel Whitburn Presents the Billboard Hot 100 Charts: The Seventies (ISBN 0-89820-076-8)
- Joel Whitburn Presents the Billboard Hot 100 Charts: The Eighties (ISBN 0-89820-079-2)
- Joel Whitburn Presents the Billboard Hot 100 Charts: The Nineties (ISBN 0-89820-137-3)
- Joel Whitburn Presents the Billboard Hot 100 Charts: The 2000s (ISBN 0-89820-182-9)
- Additional information obtained can be verified within the chart archives on Billboard.com, as well as through print editions of the magazine.
