= Pebbles, Volume 9 =

Pebbles, Volume 9 may refer to:

- Pebbles, Volume 9 (1980 album)
- Pebbles, Volume 9 (1996 album)
