= Little Women (disambiguation) =

Little Women is an 1868–69 novel by Louisa May Alcott.

Little Women may also refer to:

== Film ==
- Little Women (1917 film), a British silent film directed by Alexander Butler
- Little Women (1918 film), an American silent film directed by Harley Knoles
- Little Women (1933 film), starring Katharine Hepburn and Joan Bennett
- Little Women (1949 film), starring Elizabeth Taylor and June Allyson
- Little Women (1994 film), starring Winona Ryder, Susan Sarandon, Kirsten Dunst, and Christian Bale
- Little Women (2018 film), starring Sarah Davenport and Lucas Grabeel
- Little Women (2019 film), starring Saoirse Ronan, Emma Watson, Florence Pugh, Eliza Scanlen, Timothée Chalamet, and Meryl Streep

== Television ==
=== Based on the novel ===
- Little Women (1950 TV series), produced by Pamela Brown for the BBC
- Little Women (Studio One), produced for CBS
- Little Women (1958 TV series), produced by Joy Harington for the BBC
- Little Women (1970 TV series), third adaptation produced for the BBC
- Little Women (1978 miniseries) produced by Universal Television, starring Meredith Baxter and Susan Dey
- Little Women (1981 TV series), produced by Toei Animation
- Tales of Little Women, produced by Nippon Animation
- Little Women (2017 TV series), adapted by Heidi Thomas for the BBC
- Little Women (2022 TV series), a South Korean television series

=== Dwarfism ===
- Little Women: LA, an American reality television series (2014-) based in Los Angeles, California
- Little Women: NY, an American reality television series (2015-) based in New York City
- Little Women: Terra's Little Family, an American reality television series (2015-)
- Little Women: Atlanta, an American reality television series (2016-)
- Little Women: Dallas, an American reality television series (2016-)

== Stage ==
- Little Women (play), a 1912 stage adaptation of the novel, adapted by Marian de Forest
- Little Women (musical), a 2005 musical adaptation of the novel with lyrics by Mindi Dickstein, music by Jason Howland, and book by Allan Knee
- Little Women (opera), a 1998 opera composed by Mark Adamo, based on the novel

== Music ==
- Little Women, band formed in 1982 by Jerry Joseph and others

== See also ==
- Dwarfism
- Girl
- "Little Woman", a 1969 song by Bobby Sherman
- "Little Woman Love", a 1971 song by Wings
- "A Little Woman", a 1923 short story
- The Little Woman, a 1962 film
