= Metromedia Records =

- Parent company: Metromedia Inc.
- Founded: 1968
- Defunct: Mid-1970s
- Genre: Various
- Country of origin: United States

Metromedia Records was an American record label founded in the late 1960s. It was part of the Metromedia organization. They had hits with many artists, with the most successful being Bobby Sherman.

== Background ==
A label associated with Metromedia was Metromedia Country which was established by Jack Wiedenmann. The label bought the contracts of artists, Bobby G. Rice and Mel Street. Dick Heard who was formerly the president of the Royal American label was taken on to run the operation in Nashville in 1972.

Bobby Sherman, who was a prolific recording artist on Metromedia Records brought in eleven national hits for the label.

== Company history ==
It was reported by Billboard in the magazine's 14 September 1968 issue that Metromedia was launching their new company, Metromedia Records. According to John W. Kluge, the chairman of the board and president of Metromedia Inc., Leonard S. Levy was to be president of the label. Levy had previously been the head of Epic Records. This entry into music had come directly after Metromedia Inc. had purchased the music publishing interests of Thomas Valando.

It was reported by Record World in the magazine's 8 February 1969 issue that an announcement had been made by the label's president, Leonard S. Levy regarding the first releases. They were releasing four singles in various pop music areas. The pricing for recordings at the time was 98c for singles at present, and $4.98 for albums in the following month. According to the article, the first release was "Wiwwian Wevy" by Pastrami Malted which was a pop group. The second was "Swamp" by a five-person group from Laurel Canyon called Swamp People. The third release was "Hawk" by a duo called Sunny Daze. The final one was "Jubilee Joe" from the Broadway production, Red, White and Maddox by Manny Kellem, his Orchestra and Voices. The records were presented in a press-kit with an information summary about the release as well as a biography and photo of the artist. A statement about the goals of Metromedia was also included.

According to the 9 August 1969 issue of Record World, Metromedia Records in New York had moved to new premises at 1700 Broadway.

It was reported in the 17 January 1970 issue of Cash Box that Ron Kramer who had been with Metromedia Records for nine months as West Coast A&R director had left his position. At the time he hadn't made an indication of any future plans. During his time with the label, he had signed up former Capitol act, The Outsiders and The Golddiggers who were with the Dean Martin Show.

By September 1970, Ann Stinson had left the label to join Motown as their West Coast studio tape librarian.

By February 1973, Dave Knight had left the label to explore other affiliations in the industry. During his 3½ years with the label, he had been regional manager in the East, Midwest, West Coast and national promotions director.

It was reported in the 21 April 1973 issue of Cash Box that Jack Wiedenmann, the president of Metromedia Records had opened new offices in Hollywood at 8255 Sunset Blvd, 90028. At the same time, Wiedenmann had appointed Julio Aiello to the position of director of West Coast operations. Before his promotion, Aiello was regional representative in Hollywood. His new role was to supervise recording projects, review new projects, artists and masters. Wiedenmann had also appointed Ginger Grigg to the role of administrative assistant to the president. Wiedenmann's aim was to spend 50% of his time in the West Coast area as many of their new artists were from the region. He said they realized the importance of the West Coast music scene and planned to play an active part there.

== Artists and releases ==
=== 1960s ===
Bambi McCormick's self-titled album was released on Metromedia Records MD 1002. It had a positive review in the 10 May 1969 issue of Record World, where she was referred to as an attractive new find. Her powerful voice was noted with the recommended tracks being "Why Can't I Walk Away", "Knowing When to Leave", and "I Keep It Hid".

Bobby Sherman's single, "Little Woman" was released on Metromedia Records MMS-121 in May 1969. It was one of the Record World Sleeper Picks of the Week for the week of 31 May. It would eventually become a national hit, peaking at No. 3 on the Billboard chart.

By the end of May 1969, The Golddiggers who were an entourage of dancers and singers were signed to Metromedia Records. They had been featured on the Dean Martin Show. Ron Kramer had produced their album which was out for imminent release.

Two of the label's albums were reviewed in the 9 August 1969 issue of Record World. They were The Astral Scene on MD 1005 by The Astral Projection and Milkwood Tapestry on MD 1007 by Milkwood Tapestry.

It was reported in the 9 August 1969 issue of Record World that the label's act, The Winstons had earnt a gold record with "Color Him Father". The announcement was made by the label's president, Leonard S. Levy.

=== 1970s ===
Working with arrangerAl Ham, The Hillside Singers recorded "I'd Like to Teach the World to Sing" which was based on the Coca-Cola theme. It was released by Metromedia Records in 1971. The song also debuted at No. 122 in the Record World 101 - 150 Singles chart that week. According to the 20 November 1971 issue of Record World, in spite of rumors about legal action by Coca-Cola in relation to the recording, the label announced that there was no such action.

Brent Talbot, son of the famous Talbot Brothers bassist Roy Talbot, recorded pop-soul and R&B music for Metromedia Records in the early 1970s , notably releasing the 1970 singles "Sleep Tight 'Til Morning", "Don't You Call My Name," and “Tomorrow’s Man To Be”, which were produced by Tommy James & Bob James and arranged by Jim Hunter.

Winchester was a five-man rock group who had signed with Metromedia Records in late 1972. It had been announced in the 9 December 1972 issue of Billboard that their single was to be "Hot on the Heels of Love". Working with producers, Reid S. Whitelaw, Don Oriolo and Norman Bergen, Winchester recorded the composition by Mark Barkan, and two of the producers, Whitelaw and Oriolo. Backed with "You'll Always Be the One I Love", it was released on Metromedia Records MMS 264 in 1972. It was chart hit, peaking at No. 107 on the Record World 101 - 150 Singles chart for the week of 3 February 1973. In later years, it became a Northern Soul attraction. It appears on The Golden Age of Northern Soul compilation.

Sourdough was a five-man rock band consisting of Larry Siegel, Tommy Knapp, Rick Varotella, Mark Berger and Otis Weiner. Having signed to Metromedia Records, they were pictured in the 21 April 1973 issue of Cash Box with President Jack Wiedenmann.

== Closure ==
The company closed in the mid-1970s.

At some stage prior to May 1974, the Metromedia Records catalogue and artist roster was acquired by Chess/Janus.
