= Fireball Jungle =

1968 drama film starring John Russell and Lon Chaney Jr.

- Directed by: Joseph G. Mawra
- Written by: Harry Whittington
- Produced by: G.B. Roberts, Eli Jackson
- Cinematography: Clifford Poland
- Edited by: John Dalton
- Music by: Ethel Huber
- Production company: Americana Productions
- Release date: October 1968
- Running time: 1hr. 36min
- Country: United States
- Language: English
- Box office: $111,474

Fireball Jungle is a 1968 melodrama directed by Joseph P. Mawra and starring John Russell and Lon Chaney Jr. The film featured the hit single, "Love (Can Make You Happy)" by Mercy and was filmed in and around Tampa, Florida.

== Plot ==
Gangster Nero Solitarius hires stock car driver Cateye Meares, leader of a band of sadistic thugs, to help him gain control of several automobile racetracks. Steve Cullen, whose brother was killed in an accident caused by Cateye, races under an alias while attempting to implicate the murderer. Infuriated by Steve's skill, Cateye assaults him. After Old Sam, a junkyard owner forced to fence stolen cars for Nero's syndicate, is burned alive, Steve fights Cateye in his hideout. Although badly beaten, Steve attempts to expose Cateye. During the big race, Cateye is killed in a spectacular crash while being chased by the police.

== Cast ==
- John Russell as Nero Solitarius
- Lon Chaney Jr. as Old Sam
- Alan Mixon as Ronald Elwood "Cateye" Meares
- Randy Kirby as Steve Cullen
- Chuck Daniel as Marty
- Nancy Donohue as Ann Tracey
- Vicki Nunis as Judy
- Billy Blueriver as Moose
- Mercy as themselves
- Babs Beatty as fruit stand woman
- Tiny Kennedy as nightclub singer
