= A Warm Shade of Ivory =

Studio album by Henry Mancini
- Released: 1969
- Recorded: 1969
- Studio: RCA Victor's Music Center of the World, Hollywood, Los Angeles
- Genre: Traditional pop
- Length: 33:28
- Label: RCA Victor LSP-4140
- Producer: Joe Reisman

Henry Mancini chronology
Brass on Ivory (1969)	A Warm Shade of Ivory (1969)	The Big Latin Band of Henry Mancini (1970)

A Warm Shade of Ivory is a 1969 album by American composer and arranger Henry Mancini issued by RCA Records. The album peaked at No. 5 on the Billboard Album Chart on 2 August 1969. Mancini's arrangement of Nino Rota’s "Love Theme from Romeo and Juliet" topped the Billboard Hot 100 singles chart on June 28, 1969, and remained there for two weeks.

== Reception ==
Professional ratings
Review scores
Source	Rating
Allmusic	4.5/5 stars

Greg Adams reviewed the album for Allmusic and wrote that it "focuses on his skill as a piano soloist". Adams noted that Mancini's "lush orchestrations are reminiscent of Mantovani, as piano notes sparkle on the surface of immense waves of strings...the music is not fundamentally different from his typical fare, and encompasses his usual assortment of traditional and adult pop melodies and film themes". Adams concluded that the album was "a lovely, contemplative collection that combines Mancini's skills in new and unequivocally successful ways".

High Fidelity magazine reviewed the album in July 1969 and wrote that "Underneath the piano lies a rich tapestry of orchestration that denotes Mancini's true artistry".

== Track listing ==
1. "In the Wee Small Hours of the Morning" (David Mann, Bob Hilliard) – 2:48
2. "Cycles" (Gayle Caldwell) – 3:05
3. "Moment to Moment" (Henry Mancini, Johnny Mercer) – 2:54
4. "A Day in the Life of a Fool" (Luiz Bonfá, Carl Sigman) – 3:30
5. "Watch What Happens" (Norman Gimbel, Michel Legrand, Jacques Demy) – 3:20
6. "By the Time I Get to Phoenix" (Jimmy Webb) – 3:16
7. "Love Theme from Romeo and Juliet" (Nino Rota) – 2:33
8. "The Windmills of Your Mind" (Michel Legrand, Alan and Marilyn Bergman) – 3:00
9. "When I Look in Your Eyes" (Leslie Bricusse) – 2:38
10. "Meditation (Meditação)" (Antônio Carlos Jobim, Norman Gimbel, Newton Mendonça) – 3:09
11. "Dream a Little Dream of Me" (Fabian Andre, Wilbur Schwandt, Gus Kahn) – 3:15

== Personnel ==
- Henry Mancini – arranger, conductor, piano
- Vincent DeRosa – French horn
- Erno Neufeld – violin

Production

- Mickey Crofford – engineer
- Joe Reisman – producer

== Certifications ==
Region	Certification	Certified units/sales
United States (RIAA)	Gold	500,000^{^}
^{^} Shipments figures based on certification alone.
