= Romeo and Juliet (1968 film soundtrack) =

Album by Nino Rota

Romeo and Juliet 1968 film soundtrack

Soundtrack album by Nino Rota
- Released: October 8, 1968
- Genre: Film score
- Length: 42:37
- Label: Capitol
- Producer: Neely Plumb

The soundtrack for the 1968 film Romeo and Juliet was composed and conducted by Nino Rota. It was originally released as an LP, containing nine entries, most notably the song "What Is a Youth", composed by Nino Rota, written by Eugene Walter and performed by Glen Weston. The music score won a Silver Ribbon award of the Italian National Syndicate of Film Journalists in 1968 and was nominated for two other awards (BAFTA Award for Best Film Music in 1968 and Golden Globe Award for Best Original Score in 1969).

The soundtrack is referred to as "Original Soundtrack Recording" on the front cover with further credits to the film itself. Several other editions of the soundtrack feature different covers. In 1969, Capitol released an edition titled Romeo &. Juliet — Music from the Original Sound Track (Capitol, ST-400), it has none of the dialogue, but only the music, composed and conducted by Nino Rota.

The "Love Theme" provides the background to the narrative of Our Tune, a long-standing feature on British radio hosted by Simon Bates.

== Composition ==
The original track list includes anthems, song snatches, compositions for the ball and for a strolling trombone player.

The neo-Elizabethan ballad "What Is a Youth" is performed by a troubadour character as part of the diegesis during the Capulets' ball, at which Romeo and Juliet first meet. The original lyrics of "What Is a Youth" are borrowed from songs in other Shakespearean plays, particularly Twelfth Night and The Merchant of Venice. Although Rota's original manuscript is believed to be lost, the love theme is known to have an original published key of G minor. Romeo's theme was described as "a slow-paced minor key idea, first played by a solo English horn with strings". In the scene, where Romeo sees Juliet dancing with her family, the theme is sounded by a solo oboe over a background of tremolo strings.

== Arrangements ==
Since 1968 numerous arrangements of "What Is a Youth" have been released, most notably "A Time for Us" and "Ai Giochi Addio", both performed by various artists. The soundtrack's original label Capitol Records subsequently released three other soundtrack albums inspired by the original score. The popularity of the first of them led Capitol Records to release a four-record set of the film's entire vocal and music tracks. On June 25, 2002, the City of Prague Philharmonic Orchestra released their own arrangement of the soundtrack on the Silva America label. Other arrangements were made by André Rieu, Henry Mancini (a top ten hit in 1969), Jet Stream Orchestra, and others.

Lana Del Rey's song "Old Money" from her 2014 album Ultraviolence contains samples from "What Is a Youth".

== Critical reception ==
Professional ratings
Review scores
Source	Rating
AllMusic	[CD]

In 1968 Billboard described the score as "brilliant and moving". Cash Box called it "a most distinguished album", noting that Nino Rota's score is "an excellent complement to the dramatic excerpts from the motion picture" and that "gentle, lovely harmonies pervade the set". Contemporary feedback was also provided by John Mahoney from The Hollywood Reporter, who described the score as "one of the best and strongest components", noting that "a period ballad with lyric by Eugene Walter, 'What Is a Youth', provides the perfect setting for the meeting of the two lovers at the Capulet party".

Subsequently, Professor of English and Shakespearean literature scholar Jill L. Levenson wrote that Rota's score "heightened the sentiment of the lovers' relationship, doing little for their verisimilitude". According to a BBC review, "the suite from Romeo and Juliet is a florid symphony drawing on Rota's classical background for its lush themes – swaggering hunting horn for the amorous swain, mournful lute for the awakening girl". Critic Jack Jorgens dismissed "What Is a Youth" for being "sickly sweet".

== Track listing ==
All tracks are written by Nino Rota.

Side one
No.	Title	Length
1.	"Prologue"	2:46
2.	"What Is a Youth"	7:24
3.	"The Balcony Scene"	9:26

All tracks are written by Nino Rota.

Side two
No.	Title	Length
1.	"Romeo & Juliet Are Wed"	3:00
2.	"The Death of Mercutio and Tybalt"	3:35
3.	"Farewell Love Scene"	4:21
4.	"The Likeness of Death"	2:36
5.	"In Capulet's Tomb"	7:22
6.	"All Are Punished"	2:07

== Certifications ==
Region	Certification	Certified units/sales
United States (RIAA)	Platinum	1,000,000^{^}
^{^} Shipments figures based on certification alone.

== See also ==
- "Love Theme from Romeo and Juliet"
