= Hey, Mister Sun =

Single by Bobby Sherman

from the album With Love, Bobby
- B-side: "Two Blind Minds"
- Released: 1970
- Genre: Bubblegum pop
- Length: 2:32
- Label: Metromedia
- Songwriter: Danny Janssen
- Producers: Jackie Mills; Arranged and conducted by Al Capps

Bobby Sherman singles chronology
"Easy Come, Easy Go" (1970)	"Hey, Mister Sun" (1970)	"Julie, Do Ya Love Me" (1970)

"Hey, Mister Sun" is a song by Bobby Sherman released in 1970. The song spent nine weeks on the Billboard Hot 100 chart, peaking at No. 24, while reaching No. 3 on Billboard's Easy Listening chart. In Canada, the song reached No. 19 on the "RPM 100", and No. 7 on Toronto's CHUM 30 chart.

== Chart performance ==
Chart (1970)	Peak position
US Billboard Hot 100	24
US Billboard Easy Listening	3
Canada RPM 100	19
Canada CHUM 30	7
