= 2525 (Exordium & Terminus) =

Studio album by Zager and Evans
- Released: July 1969
- Studios: RCA Studios, Chicago; unnamed studio, Odessa, Texas
- Genres: Psychedelic rock, psychedelic folk, folk rock
- Length: 28:30
- Label: RCA Victor
- Producers: Zager and Evans, Ted Daryll

Zager and Evans chronology
| 2525 (Exordium & Terminus) (1969) | The Early Writings of Zager & Evans and Others (1969) |

Singles from 2525 (Exordium & Terminus)
- 1. "In the Year 2525 (Exordium & Terminus)"/"Little Kids" Released: June 1969

Professional ratings
Review scores
| Source | Rating |
|---|---|
| Allmusic | 2/5 stars |

2525 (Exordium & Terminus) is the debut studio album by Zager and Evans and was released in 1969. It reached #30 on the Billboard Top LPs chart. The album featured the single "In the Year 2525 (Exordium & Terminus)", which reached #1 on the Billboard Hot 100, on the adult contemporary chart, on the UK Singles Chart, and on the Canadian Pop and AC charts.

== Track listing ==
All tracks are written by Rick Evans.

| No. | Title | Length |
|---|---|---|
| 1. | "In the Year 2525 (Exordium & Terminus)" | 3:10 |
| 2. | "Woman" | 1:17 |
| 3. | "Bayoan" | 2:45 |
| 4. | "I Remember Heide" | 2:16 |
| 5. | "Fred" | 3:43 |
| 6. | "Cary Lynn Javes" | 3:09 |
| 7. | "Less than Tomorrow" | 2:24 |
| 8. | "Taxi Man" | 3:17 |
| 9. | "Self" | 2:07 |
| 10. | "In the Land of Green" | 4:22 |
| Total length: | | 28:30 |

== Personnel ==
- Rick Evans – guitar, producer
- Denny Zager – guitar, producer
- Mark Dalton – bass
- Dave Trupp – drums
- Norm Christian – drums
- Bobby Christian – arrangements, orchestrations

Technical

- Brian Christian – engineer

== Charts ==
| Chart (1969) | Peak position |
|---|---|
| Billboard | 30 |
| Canada | 7 |

Singles

| Year | Single | Chart | Position |
|---|---|---|---|
| 1969 | "In the Year 2525 (Exordium and Terminus)" | Australia Kent Music Report Singles Chart | 2 |
| 1969 | "In the Year 2525 (Exordium and Terminus)" | Canada RPM Singles Chart | 1 |
| 1969 | "In the Year 2525 (Exordium and Terminus)" | Ireland IRMA Singles Chart | 1 |
| 1969 | "In the Year 2525 (Exordium and Terminus)" | New Zealand Listener Singles Chart | 1 |
| 1969 | "In the Year 2525 (Exordium and Terminus)" | UK Singles Chart | 1 |
| 1969 | "In the Year 2525 (Exordium and Terminus)" | US Billboard Hot 100 | 1 |
| 1969 | "In the Year 2525 (Exordium and Terminus)" | US AC chart | 1 |
