= The Bad Roads =

American garage rock band

Background information
- Origin: Lake Charles, Louisiana, United States
- Genres: Garage rock; rock and roll; proto-punk
- Years active: 1964-1967
- Labels: Jin; Rain Tyre
- Past members: Danny Kimball; Briant Smith; Buz Clark; Terry Green; Kenny Cooley; Michael Hicks; Perry Gaspard; Bruce "Weasel" MacDonald

The Bad Roads were an American garage rock band formed in Lake Charles, Louisiana in 1964. Musically influenced by the Rolling Stones, the group released two singles during their recording career, most notably the fuzz-driven proto-punk record, "Blue Girl." After disbanding in 1967, the group largely faded from view but has more recently experienced a resurgence of interest in their music with release of a 1999 EP on Sundazed Music containing all of their recorded work.

== History ==
The Bad Roads were formed in Lake Charles, Louisiana in 1964. Members Danny Kimball (drums) and Briant Smith (lead guitar) were friends since childhood, and influenced by the material originating from popular musical acts in New Orleans. The two regularly attended performances by local bands such as Sonny and the Blue Diamonds and the Boogie Kings, and, upon the onset of the British Invasion, began jam sessions in their neighborhood. In early 1965, they recruited Terry Green (lead guitar), Kenny Cooley (tambourine), and Michael Hicks (bass guitar) to form an instrumental group known as the Avengers. The Avengers soon morphed into a raw rock and roll group after being inspired by the recording of the Rolling Stones', particularly their hit song, "(I Can't Get No) Satisfaction", and the album, Out of Our Heads. Smith explains "To me, the Stones, like the Beatles, they gave us our music back. We'd lost all that, the rockabilly and everything. But when Out Of Our Heads came out it had the whole New Orleans thing, everything that we knew."

The band renamed themselves the Bad Roads, after Duane Eddy's 1959 song, "Forty Miles of Bad Road". Renowned for their rebellious attitude, the refashioned group played in venues such as LeFluer’s Roller Rink in nearby Sulphur, with an itinerary that stretched as far west as Houston, playing at the Catacombs alongside other musical acts such as the Moving Sidewalks and the Countdown Five as well as north to Natchez and Shreveport, and east appearing in clubs such as the Golden Slipper in Baton Rouge. At a gig in November 1965, the Bad Roads were joined by the River Rats' vocalist Buz Clark, who assumed the role as the group's permanent singer. Clark's appearances for the band's performances were sometimes scarce as the singer who had dropped out of school needed to hitch hike to each scheduled gig. Nonetheless, his high-energy live renditions made him the Bad Roads' bona fide frontman.

In August 1966, the Bad Roads entered Floyd Soileau's studio in Ville Platte to record two originals "Blue Girl" and "Too Bad" for their debut single. Upon release on the Jin label, the single became a regional success. As a result, the group opened for more prominent acts such as the Music Machine, Sam the Sham, and Question Mark and the Mysterians, while breaking several attendance records in the region. For a brief period, the Bad Roads were among the top musical draws in Louisiana often having to defend themselves from crazed teenage fans intruding the stage. Prior to their follow-up single, the band added organist Perry Gaspard, and Bruce "Weasel" MacDonald replaced Green on guitar. The band's second single included cover versions of the Kinks' "Til the End of the Day" and Them's "Don't Look Back", and was released in early 1967 on their self-produced Rain Tyre label. Though the release was received as well as their debut, the Bad Roads disbanded in mid-1967.

"Blue Girl" and "Too Bad" have been re-released on various compilations such as Louisiana Punk Groups from the Sixties, Vol. 2, and Pebbles, Volume 9.

In 1999, all of the Bad Roads' material was issued on an EP distributed by Sundazed Music. In 2004, the group reconvened for a performance at the Pondera Stomp festival in New Orleans. In 2007 Danny Kimball led the release of a full length CD of all new material from the band, which then included Clark, Smith, Macdonald, Kimball (all from 1960's lineups) plus Steve Morrow on bass and a number of guests on keyboards and saxophone.

== Discography ==
Singles
Date	A-Side	B-Side
1966	Blue Girl	Too Bad
1967	Til The End Of The Day	Don't Look Back

EPs
Date	EP Title
1999	Blue Girl

Albums
Date	Album Title
2007	Union Town
