= La La La (If I Had You) =

Single by Bobby Sherman
- B-side: "Time"
- Released: November 1969
- Genre: Bubblegum pop
- Length: 2:44
- Label: Metromedia
- Songwriter: Danny Janssen
- Producers: Jackie Mills; Arranged and conducted by Al Capps

Bobby Sherman singles chronology
"Little Woman" (1969)	"La La La (If I Had You)" (1969)	"Easy Come, Easy Go" (1970)

"La La La (If I Had You)" is a song by Bobby Sherman released in November 1969. Written by Danny Janssen (who had written Sherman's previous single, Little Woman), the song spent 11 weeks on the Billboard Hot 100 chart, peaking at No. 9, while reaching No. 14 on Billboard's Easy Listening chart. In Canada, the song reached No. 7 on the "RPM 100", No. 15 on RPM's adult contemporary chart, and No. 16 on Toronto's CHUM 30 chart. The song earned Sherman a gold record.

== Chart performance ==
Chart (1969–1970)	Peak position
US Billboard Hot 100	9
US Billboard Easy Listening	14
Canada - RPM 100	7
Canada - RPM Adult	15
Canada – CHUM 30	16
