= I Will Always Think About You =

Single by New Colony Six

from the album Revelations
- B-side: "Hold Me With Your Eyes"
- Released: January 1968
- Genre: Pop
- Length: 2:22
- Label: Mercury
- Songwriters: Ronald Rice; Les Kummel
- Producer: Pete Wright

New Colony Six singles chronology
"Love You So Much" (1967)	"I Will Always Think About You" (1968)	"Can't You See Me Cry" (1968)

"I Will Always Think About You" is a song by the American rock band New Colony Six, released in 1968 on their album Revelations and as a single. The song became a top 30 hit in the U.S., peaking at number 22 on the U.S. Billboard Hot 100 and Cash Box Top 100 Singles charts, and number 14 in Canada on the RPM Top Singles chart.

The song was a major hit in the Chicago market, where it reached number one on WLS-AM.

== Chart performance ==
Chart (1968)	Peak position
Canada Top Singles (RPM)	14
US Billboard Hot 100	22
US Cash Box Top 100	22
