= Easy Come, Easy Go (Bobby Sherman song) =

Single by Bobby Sherman

from the album Here Comes Bobby
- B-side: "Sounds Along The Way"
- Released: January 1970
- Recorded: 1969
- Genre: Pop
- Length: 2:43
- Label: Metromedia
- Songwriters: Jack Keller, Diane Hildebrand
- Producers: Jackie Mills; Arranged and conducted by Al Capps

Bobby Sherman singles chronology
"La La La (If I Had You)" (1969)	"Easy Come, Easy Go" (1970)	"Hey, Mister Sun" (1970)

"Easy Come, Easy Go" is a song written by Jack Keller and Diane Hildebrand that was a hit single for Bobby Sherman in 1970.

The song was first released by Mama Cass Elliot on July 5, 1969, on her album Bubblegum, Lemonade, and... Something for Mama. Bobby Sherman's version was released as a single in January 1970, and appeared on the album Here Comes Bobby, which was released in March of the same year. It was also recorded and released on single by UK singer Frank Ifield in 1970; however, his version did not chart.

Sherman's version spent 14 weeks on the Billboard Hot 100 chart, peaking at No. 9, while reaching No. 2 on Billboard's Easy Listening chart. In Canada, the song reached No. 6 on the "RPM 100", No. 7 on RPM's adult contemporary chart, and No. 2 on Toronto's CHUM 30 chart. The song earned Sherman a gold record.

== Chart performance ==
=== Weekly charts ===
Chart (1970–1971)	Peak position
Canada RPM 100	6
Canada RPM Adult	7
Canada – CHUM 30	2
US Billboard Hot 100	9
US Billboard Easy Listening	2
US Cash Box Top 100	7

=== Year-end charts ===
Chart (1970)	Rank
Canada RPM 100	89
US Billboard Hot 100	56
US Cash Box Top 100	46
