= Julie, Do Ya Love Me =

Single by Bobby Sherman

from the album With Love, Bobby
- B-side: "Spend Some Time Lovin' Me"
- Released: July 1970
- Genre: Pop
- Length: 2:52
- Label: Metromedia
- Songwriter: Tom Bahler
- Producers: Jackie Mills; Arranged and conducted by Al Capps

Bobby Sherman singles chronology
"Hey, Mister Sun" (1970)	"Julie, Do Ya Love Me" (1970)	"Goin' Home (Sing A Song Of Christmas Cheer)" (1970)

"Julie, Do Ya Love Me" is a song written by Tom Bahler, which was a hit recording in 1970 for Bobby Sherman and later the same year for White Plains.

== Bobby Sherman version ==
In July 1970, Bobby Sherman released "Julie, Do Ya Love Me" as a single, and it appeared on the album With Love, Bobby, which was released the same year.

Bobby Sherman's version spent 15 weeks on the Billboard Hot 100 chart, peaking at No. 5, while reaching No. 2 on Billboard's Easy Listening chart, No. 3 on the Cash Box Top 100, No. 3 on Australia's Go-Set chart, and No. 28 on the UK Singles Chart. In Canada, the song reached No. 3 on the "RPM 100" and No. 2 on Toronto's CHUM 30 chart. The song earned Sherman a gold record. The trumpet was played by Lloyd Michels, who for a time played in the band on The Merv Griffin Show.

=== Chart performance ===
Chart (1970)	Peak position
Australia - Go-Set	3
Canada - RPM 100	3
Canada - CHUM 30	2
US Billboard Hot 100	5
US Billboard Easy Listening	2
US Cash Box Top 100	3
UK Singles Chart	28

== White Plains version ==
On October 9, 1970, White Plains released the song as a single, and in 1971 it appeared on the album When You Are a King. White Plains' version spent 14 weeks on the UK Singles Chart, reaching No. 8, while spending 9 weeks on the Irish Singles Chart, also reaching No. 8.

=== Chart performance ===
Chart (1970)	Peak position
UK Singles Chart	8
Irish Singles Chart	8
