= Forever (The Little Dippers song) =

Single by the Little Dippers
- B-side: "Two by Four"
- Released: January 1960
- Recorded: 1959
- Genre: Easy listening
- Length: 2:18
- Label: University Records
- Songwriter: Buddy Killen
- Producer: Buddy Killen

"Forever" is a song written by Buddy Killen, which was released by the Little Dippers and Billy Walker in January 1960.

== Background and chart performance ==
Using the pseudonym "The Little Dippers", the Anita Kerr Singers recorded "Forever" in the fall of 1959. Their version of the song was released in January 1960, and spent 14 weeks on the Billboard Hot 100 chart, peaking at No. 9, while reaching No. 13 on Canada's CHUM Hit Parade.

== Cover versions ==
- Billy Walker also released a version of the song in January 1960, which spent 1 week on the Billboard Hot 100 chart, peaking at No. 83.
- In 1964, Pete Drake released a cover of the song, which spent 11 weeks on the Billboard Hot 100 chart, peaking at No. 25, while reaching No. 5 on Billboard's Pop-Standard Singles chart, and No. 17 on Canada's CHUM Hit Parade.
- In 1969, Mercy released a cover of the song, which spent 5 weeks on the Billboard Hot 100 chart, peaking at No. 79, while reaching No. 24 on Billboard's Easy Listening chart, No. 60 on Canada's RPM 100, and No. 24 on RPM's Adult Contemporary chart.
- American soul singer, Jalen Ngonda, interpolates the chorus melody of the song in his 2022 single 'Just Like You Used To', featured on his 2023 album Come Around And Love Me. Killen is credited as a songwriter, alongside Ngonda and Sam Knowles.

== In popular culture ==
"Forever" appears in the films Priscilla (2023) and in the ending of Obsession (2025).
