= Love (Can Make You Happy) =

Single by Mercy

from the album Love (Can Make You Happy) (Sundi) Love Can Make You Happy (Warner Bros.)
- B-side: "Fire Ball"
- Released: March 1969
- Genre: Sunshine pop
- Length: 3:11
- Label: Sundi 6811 (Original); Warner Bros. 7291 (Re-recording)
- Songwriters: Jack Sigler, Jr.
- Producers: Mike Apsey, Ron Resler (Sundi); Brad Shapiro, Steve Alaimo (Warner Bros.)

Mercy singles chronology
| "Love (Can Make You Happy)" (1969) | "Forever" (1969) |

"Love (Can Make You Happy)" is a song written by Jack Sigler, Jr. and performed by Mercy. It reached #2 on the Billboard Hot 100, where "Get Back" by The Beatles kept it from the #1 spot.

On other US charts, the song also peaked at #2 on Billboard's Easy Listening chart in 1969. Outside the US, the song reached #2 on Canada's RPM 100, and #1 on RPM's Adult Contemporary chart.

The song was ranked #42 on Billboard magazine's Top Hot 100 songs of 1969.

== History ==
The song was originally released on Sundi Records, but as the single climbed up the charts, the group's lead singer, Sigler, faced being drafted. Sundi Records quickly released the album Love (Can Make You Happy) that included the song plus other cover songs that were not recorded by any of the original group. Sigler, who ended up not being drafted, signed the group to Warner Bros. Records where they recorded a sound-a-like version of the single and released the album, Love Can Make You Happy. Since Sigler never signed with Sundi, the record label was sued and the original album was banned from distribution.

The Sundi recording was produced by Mike Apsey and Ron Resler and the Warner Bros. recording produced by Brad Shapiro and Steve Alaimo.

== Chart history ==
=== Weekly charts ===
| Chart (1969) | Peak position |
|---|---|
| Canada RPM Adult Contemporary | 1 |
| Canada RPM Top Singles | 2 |
| US Billboard Hot 100 | 2 |
| US Billboard Adult Contemporary | 2 |
| US Cash Box Top 100 | 2 |

=== Year-end charts ===
| Chart (1969) | Rank |
|---|---|
| Canada RPM Top Singles | 43 |
| US Billboard Easy Listening | 16 |
| US Billboard Hot 100 | 42 |

== Other versions ==
- Boris Gardiner released a version of the song as a single in Jamaica in 1969.
- James Marvell released a version of the song as a single in 1981 that reached #90 on the country chart.
- The song was sampled by indie pop band Belle and Sebastian for their song "(My Girl's Got) Miraculous Technique".

== In media ==
- The original version of the song was featured in the 1969 film, Fireball Jungle.
- A portion of the song is on his truck's radio as Denzel Washington's character, Joe Deacon "Deke", in the 2021 film The Little Things while he is on the hunt for a serial killer's vehicle.
