= New Colony Six =

American soft rock band formed 1964

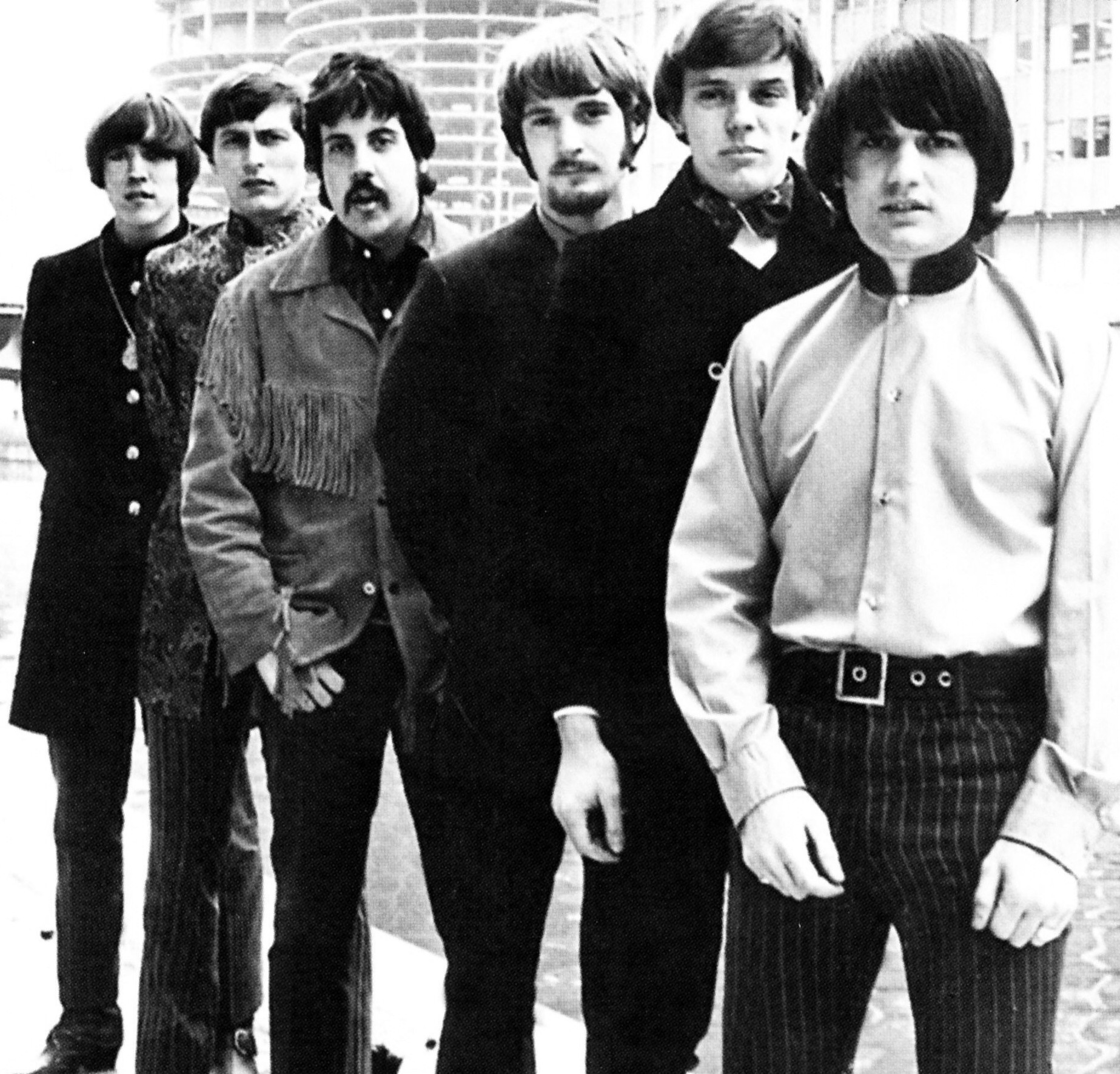
The group in 1968. From left: Gerry Von Kollenberg, Ray Graffia Jr., Ronnie Rice, Pat McBride, Chic James, Les Kummel.

New Colony Six (sometimes abbreviated as NC6) is an American garage and later soft rock band from Chicago, formed in 1964.

American author and journalist Richie Unterberger characterized the group's sound as "a poppier American Them with their prominent organ, wobbly Lesley-fied guitar amplifications, and rave-up tempos", later devolving into "a cabaret-ish band with minor national hits to their credit by the end of the 1960s."

== Beginnings and early success ==
New Colony Six was initially composed of students from St. Patrick's High School on Chicago's northwest side. On average, its members were about 18 years old.

NC6, like Paul Revere & the Raiders (with whom they shared a two-flat before either band hit the charts), wore Colonial outfits when performing. However, at that time neither the Raiders nor NC6 knew the other band had nearly identical costumes. In late 1964, the band was passed over by Columbia Records and Dick Clark Productions in favor of the Raiders for the ABC-TV show Where the Action Is.

When this happened, Ray Graffia Sr. (father of an NC6 member) paid for the recording studio work on the group's first single, "I Confess" and was supported by other parents who agreed to help with costs. They founded the group's record label Centaur (later Sentaur and finally, Sentar). At the time, the group was self-managed; NC6 later turned to Pete Wright and Howard Bedno, who were active in the promotion of recording artists.

The group's height of popularity occurred between 1966 and 1971, with ten singles on the Hot 100. In early 1966, the group's debut album Breakthrough (Centaur Records) was released, featuring "I Confess". "I Confess" was NC6's first major local hit in Chicago (radio station WLS #2 on 4 February 1966, Hot 100 #80 on 5-12 March 1966). NC6's record distribution was picked up by Cameo-Parkway Records; their label changed from Centaur to Sentar on their next album, 1967's Colonization, which included the single "Love You So Much" (Hot 100 #61 on 25 March 1967, #49 Canada).

In late 1967, with the acquisition of Ronnie Rice and a new contract with Mercury Records, New Colony Six's recorded presence stepped back from their "garage rock" image and sound. Mercury promoted them as a "soft rock" band. The band's two biggest hits were Rice's "I Will Always Think About You" (Hot 100 #22 on 1 June 1968, #14 RPM Canada) and "Things I'd Like to Say" (Hot 100 #16 on 22–29 March 1969, #6 Canada).

These were followed by "I Could Never Lie To You" (Hot 100 #50 on 14 June 1969, #38 Canada). However, none of the group's last four Hot 100 entries, from late summer 1969 to New Year's Day 1972, reached the top 55 of the Hot 100 chart.

== Changes to band lineup ==
There have been numerous changes to the New Colony Six lineup over the years. Original members included Ray Graffia Jr. (vocals); Chic James (drums); Pat McBride (harmonica); Craig Kemp (organ); Wally Kemp (bass); and Gerry Van Kollenburg (guitar). Ronnie Rice (vocals, keyboards, guitar) replaced Craig Kemp in 1966. Current members include Graffia, Rice and Bruce Mattey.

Ellery Temple briefly joined the group in 1967, replacing Wally Kemp. He was subsequently replaced by Les Kummel (who died in 1978 at age 33 in a Chicago auto accident), then by Bruce Gordon in August 1969.

Billy Herman (vocals, drums) replaced Chic James in 1969. Ray Graffia left in early 1969 but returned and (as of 2023) remains part of the band. When Craig Kemp left, he was replaced by Chuck Jobes (keyboards). Bruce Gordon (bass) joined in August 1969. Skip Griparis was playing guitar and singing lead vocals in 1972 until the band initially stopped performing at the end of 1974.

== Past and ongoing activity ==
In 1988, the band played a reunion show at Chicago's Park West organized by Bruce Gordon and (as of 2023) has continued to perform. New Colony Six also participates in The Cornerstones of Rock concert series, along with four other well-known Chicagoland mid-60's bands: The Buckinghams, The Shadows of Knight, The Cryan' Shames and The Ides of March.

== Recognition ==
New Colony Six was inducted into the Iowa Rock n' Roll Music Association Hall of Fame in 2002 and the Illinois Rock & Roll Hall of Fame in 2022.

June 5, 2022 - The V1.0 Recording and Touring members of The New Colony Six - Gerry VanKollenburg, Ray Graffia, Ronnie Rice and Bruce Gordon were inducted into the Illinois Rock & Roll Hall of Fame in Joliet, Illinois.

== Discography ==
=== Albums ===
- Breakthrough (1966, Centaur)
- Colonization (1967, Sentar)
- Revelations (1968, Mercury)
- Attacking a Straw Man (1969, Mercury)
- Colonized!: the Best of New Colony Six (1993 Compilation, Rhino)
- At the River's Edge (1993 Compilation, Sundazed records)
- A Live and Well (2005 The Colony Live)

=== Singles ===
Year	Titles (A-side, B-side) Both sides from same album except where indicated	U.S. Billboard	Canada	Album
1965	"I Confess" b/w "Dawn Is Breaking"	80	–	Breakthrough
1966	"I Lie Awake" b/w "At the River's Edge"	111	–	Breakthrough
1966	"The Time of the Year Is Sunset" b/w "Sunshine" (Non-album track); Unreleased	–	–	Breakthrough
1966	"Cadillac" b/w "Sunshine"	–	–	Non-album tracks
1966	"(The Ballad of the) Wingbat Marmaduke" b/w "The Power of Love"	–	–	Colonization
1966	"Love You So Much" b/w "Let Me Love You"	61	49	Colonization
1967	"You're Gonna Be Mine" b/w "Woman"	108	–	Colonization
1967	"I'm Just Waitin' (Anticipatin' for Her to Show Up)" b/w "Hello Lonely"	128	–	Colonization
1967	"Treat Her Groovy" b/w "Rap-a-Tap" (Non-album track)	–	–	Revelations
1968	"I Will Always Think About You" b/w "Hold Me with Your Eyes"	22	14	Revelations
1968	"Can't You See Me Cry" b/w "Summertime's Another Name for Love"	52	57	Revelations
1968	"Things I'd Like to Say" b/w "Come and Give Your Love to Me" (from Attacking a Straw Man)	16	6	Revelations
1969	"I Could Never Lie to You" b/w "Just Feel Worse" (from Revelations)	50	38	Attacking a Straw Man
1969	"I Want You to Know" b/w "Free"	65	54	Attacking a Straw Man
1969	"Barbara, I Love You" b/w "Prairie Grey"	78	85	Attacking a Straw Man
1970	"People and Me" b/w "Ride the Wicked Wind" (from Attacking a Straw Man)	116	–	Non-album tracks
1970	"Close Your Eyes, Little Girl" b/w "Love, That's the Best I Can Do" (from Attacking a Straw Man)	–	–	Non-album tracks
1971	"Roll On" b/w "If You Could See"	56	53	Non-album tracks
1971	"Long Time to Be Alone" b/w "Never Be Lonely"	93	–	Non-album tracks
1972	"Someone, Sometime" b/w "Come On Down"	109	–	Non-album tracks
1974	"I Don't Really Want to Go" b/w "Run"	–	–	Non-album tracks
