= Mercy (band) =

American pop group from Florida

- Origin: Florida, United States
- Genres: Pop
- Members: Jack Sigler Jr. See full personnel at Members

Mercy is an American pop group from Florida. The group's 1969 single "Love (Can Make You Happy)", written by Jack Sigler, Jr., soared to No. 2 on the U.S. Billboard Hot 100 singles chart, and also peaked at No. 2 on the Adult Contemporary chart. "Love (Can Make You Happy)" was released in April and had sold over one million copies by July 15, earning a gold record from the R.I.A.A., although the group did not receive the award until October 2009.

The track was originally released on the small Tampa, Florida-based Sundi record label, at which time it was also included in the movie, Fireball Jungle. The B-side of the Sundi single was entitled "Fire Ball".

During the single's rapid rise in the charts, an album was released by a group calling themselves "The Mercy" (with a cover showing three female models), that included the Sundi recording, as well as several other songs that were not recorded by any of the original Mercy members.

The song was re-recorded on the Warner Brothers label, with the addition of new band members, and included on the Warner Brothers album, Love Can Make You Happy, which peaked at No. 38 on the U.S. Billboard 200 chart. Mercy had one other Billboard Hot 100 hit, the song "Forever", which reached No. 79 in June 1969.

The band is still touring with Sigler, the original lead vocalist and founder of the group. Mercy released their latest EP on iTunes in 2009.

== Discography ==
=== Albums ===
Year	Album	Billboard 200	Record Label
1968	Love (Can Make You Happy)	–	Sundi Records
1969	Love Can Make You Happy	38	Warner Bros. Records

=== Singles ===
Year	Title	Peak chart positions			Record Label	B-side	Album
Year	Title	US	AC	Canada	Record Label	B-side	Album
1969	"Love (Can Make You Happy)"	2	2	2	Sundi Records	"Fire Ball"	Love (Can Make You Happy)
1969	"Love (Can Make You Happy)"	–	–	–	Warner Bros. Records	"Never My Love"	Love Can Make You Happy
1969	"Forever"	79	24	60	Warner Bros. Records	"The Mornings Come"	Love Can Make You Happy
1969	"Hello Baby"	–	–	–	Warner Bros. Records	"Heard You Went Away"	

== Members ==
Current touring members

- Jack Sigler, Jr.
- Suzanne Sigler
- Butch Darby
- Kevin Dennis

Touring members - Warner Bros. Recording

- Jack Sigler, Jr.
- Ronnie Caudill
- Buddy Good
- Debbie Lewis
- Brenda McNish
- James Marvell
- Roger Fuentes

Original members - Sundi Recording

- Jack Sigler, Jr.
- Ann Smith (future Sigler)
- John Hudson
- Roy Shultz
- Brenda McNish
- Debbie Lewis
- Ronnie Caudill
- Lou Facenda
- Deni Hawley

== See also ==
- List of one-hit wonders in the United States
