= Things I'd Like to Say =

1968 song by the American rock band New Colony Six

Single by New Colony Six

from the album Revelations
- A-side: "Come and Give Your Love to Me"
- Released: October 1968
- Genre: Pop
- Length: 2:19
- Label: Mercury
- Songwriters: Ronald Rice; Les Kummel
- Producer: Pete Wright

New Colony Six singles chronology
"Can't You See Me Cry" (1968)	"Things I'd Like to Say" (1968)	"I Could Never Lie to You" (1969)

"Things I'd Like to Say" is a song by the American rock band New Colony Six, released in 1968 on their album Revelations and as a single. The song became a top 20 hit in the U.S., peaking at number 16 on the Billboard Hot 100 and at number 13 on the Cash Box Top 100 Singles chart, and a top 10 hit in Canada, peaking at number 6 on the RPM Top Singles chart. It also peaked at number 2 on the WLS 89 Hit Parade on 30 December 1968 in the band's home city of Chicago.

The song also peaked at number 17 on the Billboard Easy Listening chart and at number 7 on the RPM Adult Contemporary chart.

== Chart performance ==
=== Weekly charts ===
Chart (1969)	Peak position
Canada Adult Contemporary (RPM)	7
Canada Top Singles (RPM)	6
US Billboard Easy Listening	17
US Billboard Hot 100	16
US Cash Box Top 100	13

=== Year-end charts ===
Chart (1969)	Rank
US Billboard Hot 100	70
