= Little Woman =

Single by Bobby Sherman
- B-side: "One Too Many Mornings"
- Released: May 1969
- Genre: Bubblegum pop
- Length: 2:22
- Label: Metromedia MMS-221
- Songwriter: Danny Janssen
- Producer: Jackie Mills

Bobby Sherman singles chronology
"Think Of Rain" (1967)	"Little Woman" (1969)	"La La La (If I Had You)" (1969)

"Little Woman" is a 1969 song recorded by Bobby Sherman and composed by Danny Janssen.

== Background ==
Session musicians on this recording included James Burton and Alton Hendrickson on guitar, Don Randi on piano, Jerry Scheff on bass, Richard Hyde on trombone, Joe Burnett and Ollie Mitchell on trumpet, Theodore Nash and Jim Horn on saxophone, William Kurasch, Leonard Malarsky, Paul Shure, Gloria Strassner, Assa Drori and Samuel Cytron on violins, David Filerman on cello, Emil Richards on percussion, Jim Gordon on drums. Initial copies were released with Sherman singing Bob Dylan's song "One Too Many Mornings" as B-side. Some later copies substituted "Love", a song written by Sherman himself.

== Chart performance ==
Sherman's first single release on Metromedia Records, it reached No. 3 on the Billboard Hot 100 and achieved gold certification. On the rival Cash Box Top 100 chart, it reached No. 1 for one week. It also sold well in Canada, where it peaked at No. 2 in the RPM chart. In New Zealand, "Little Woman" reached No. 5. The song earned Sherman a gold record, his first of four in the U.S.

== See also ==
- Little Women (disambiguation)
