= Bobby Sherman =

American singer and actor (1943–2025)

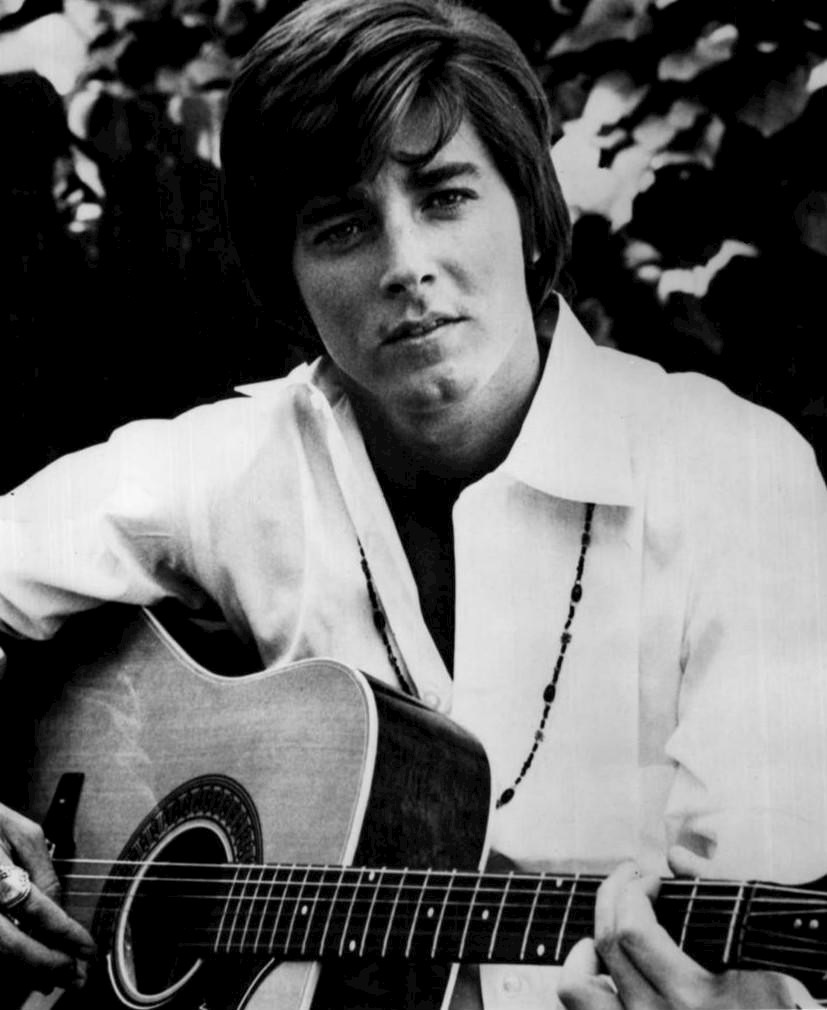
- Sherman in 1969

Background information
- Born: Robert Cabot Sherman Jr. July 22, 1943; Santa Monica, California, U.S.
- Died: June 24, 2025 (aged 81) Los Angeles, California, U.S.
- Genre: Pop
- Occupations: Singer; actor; police officer; paramedic
- Instruments: Vocals; guitar
- Years active: 1962–2001
- Labels: Various; see Discography

Robert Cabot Sherman Jr. (July 22, 1943 – June 24, 2025) was an American singer and actor who was a teen idol in the late 1960s and early 1970s. He had a series of successful singles, notably the million-seller "Little Woman" (1969). Sherman left show business in the 1970s for a career as a paramedic and a deputy sheriff, but performed occasionally into the 1990s.

== Entertainment career ==
=== Music ===
In 1962, Sal Mineo wrote two songs for Sherman and arranged for Sherman to record them. In 1964, Mineo asked Sherman to sing with his band at a Hollywood party where many actors and agents were in attendance. After this, Sherman signed with an agent and soon landed a part on the ABC television show Shindig! as a house singer and member of the cast.

Sherman made several records with Decca and another smaller label and appeared in teen magazines. In early 1968, he was selected for the role of Jeremy Bolt, a bashful, stammering logger, in the ABC television series Here Come the Brides (1968–1970). As of 1970, Sherman had received more fan mail than any other performer on the ABC-TV network.

Sherman appeared on an episode of Honey West titled "The Princess and the Paupers" as a kidnapped band member. He also appeared on The Monkees in the episode "Monkees at the Movies", playing a conceited surfer-singer named Frankie Catalina (in the model of Frankie Avalon) and performing the song "The New Girl in School" (the flip of Jan & Dean's "Dead Man's Curve").

Sherman released 107 songs, 23 singles and 10 albums between 1962 and 1976; seven of his songs were top 40 hits. He earned seven gold singles, one platinum single, and five gold albums. In 1969, he signed with Metromedia Records and released the single "Little Woman", which peaked at No. 3 on the Billboard Hot 100 chart (#2 in Canada) and spent nine weeks in the Top 20. It sold over one million copies and was awarded a gold disc by the R.I.A.A. in October 1969.

His other hits were "Julie, Do Ya Love Me" (written by Tom Bahler); "Easy Come, Easy Go"; "Jennifer"; "La La La (If I Had You)"; and "The Drum" (written by Alan O'Day). Some of these songs were produced by Jackie Mills, who also produced the Brady Bunch Kids. In Canada, "Hey, Mister Sun" reached #19; "Cried Like a Baby" reached #10; and "Waiting at the Bus Stop" reached #31. "La, La, La"; "Easy Come, Easy Go"; and "Julie, Do Ya Love Me" all sold in excess of a million copies and earned more gold discs for Sherman. "Julie, Do Ya Love Me" was Sherman's sole entry in the UK Singles Chart, where it peaked at #28 in November 1970. The song competed there for chart space with White Plains' cover version, which placed at #8.

Sherman toured extensively through the United States and the world in support of his records and albums. He gave many concerts to sellout crowds of mostly screaming young women from the late 1960s to the mid-1970s. The screaming of the young women was so loud that Sherman experienced hearing loss.

=== Television and film ===
Sherman was a regular star on the weekly ABC television network show Here Come the Brides from September 25, 1968, to September 18, 1970. He played the youngest brother, Jeremy Bolt.

Sherman was a frequent guest on American Bandstand and Where the Action Is. In March 1971 he appeared on an episode of The Partridge Family as a back-door pilot for the ABC TV series Getting Together, which aired starting in September 1971 and was canceled after 14 episodes.

Sherman was a guest star on musical variety shows including The Barbara McNair Show (1971), where he accompanied himself, playing an acoustic guitar. He also hosted The Bobby Sherman Special in 1971. Guests The 5th Dimension performed their single "Light Sings", and along with Bobby, covered Dave Mason's "Feeling Alright". Bobby alone covered "Love's Been Good To Me" (Rod McKuen), and did a medley of his hits "Little Woman," "Easy Come, Easy Go," "Julie Do Ya Love Me," "Cried Like A Baby," and "The Drum". As a guest, he sang "Marching to the Music" on The Sonny and Cher Comedy Hour that originally aired on September 29, 1972. He was also known for singing "Make Your Own Kind of Music." He knew how to play sixteen musical instruments.

Sherman was a guest star on television series such as Emergency!, The F.B.I., The Mod Squad, Ellery Queen, Murder She Wrote, and Frasier. He had also been a guest on The Ed Sullivan Show, American Bandstand, The Sonny & Cher Comedy Hour, KTLA Morning News, Visiting with Huell Howser on PBS, Good Day LA, The Rosie O'Donnell Show, Good Morning America and The Tonight Show with Johnny Carson and later Jay Leno. He was featured on 20/20, VH1, Entertainment Tonight, and Extra, among other television shows.

Sherman played the former musician Frankie Rondell, the Sanchez family's next door neighbor on the 1986 TV sitcom series, Sanchez of Bel Air.

Sherman appeared in two movies. In 1975, Sherman starred in the family film He Is My Brother, directed by Edward Dmytryk. In 1983, Sherman appeared alongside fellow teen idol Fabian as the villain's henchmen in the cult film Get Crazy, directed by Allan Arkush.

=== Comeback and retirement ===
In 1998, after an absence of 25 years, Sherman appeared in "The Teen Idol Tour" with Peter Noone and Davy Jones. (Micky Dolenz replaced Davy Jones on the tour in 1999.) Sherman performed his last concert as a solo performer in Lincoln, Rhode Island, on August 25, 2001. Although retired from public life, he still appeared at corporate and charity events. He was ranked No. 8 in TV Guide's list of "TV's 25 Greatest Teen Idols" (January 23, 2005, issue).

== Post-entertainment career ==
In 1974, Sherman guest-starred on an episode of the Jack Webb television series Emergency! ("Fools", season 3, episode 17, aired January 19, 1974), and found a new calling. Eventually, he left the public spotlight and became a paramedic. He volunteered with the Los Angeles Police Department, working with paramedics and giving CPR and first aid classes. He became a technical Reserve Police Officer with the Los Angeles Police Department in the 1990s, a position he still held as of 2017. For more than a decade he served as a medical training officer at the Los Angeles Police Academy, instructing thousands of police officers in first aid and CPR. He was named LAPD's Reserve Officer of the Year in 1999.

Sherman also became a reserve deputy sheriff in 1999 with the San Bernardino County Sheriff's Department, continuing his CPR and emergency training of new deputy hires. He retired from the sheriff's department in 2010.

Sherman and his wife co-founded the Brigitte & Bobby Sherman Children's (BBSC) Foundation. The foundation's mission is to provide motivated students in Ghana with a high-quality education and music program, and to provide tools to pursue higher education.

== Personal life, illness and death ==
Sherman was born to Robert Cabot Sherman Sr. and Juanita (née Freeman) Sherman in Santa Monica, California. He grew up in the Van Nuys neighborhood of Los Angeles, with his sister Darlene Sherman (later Mack).

Sherman married Patti Carnel on September 26, 1971. With their two sons, Christopher and Tyler, they have ten grandchildren and one great-grandchild. Sherman and Carnel divorced in 1979. Patti Carnell Sherman later married and divorced David Soul, Sherman's former co-star in Here Come the Brides. Sherman married Brigitte Poublon on July 18, 2010, in Las Vegas. Sherman and Poublon did not have children, but they did have cats, dogs, and their successful children's foundation in Ghana, Africa.

In March 2025, Sherman's diagnosis of stage IV kidney cancer was made public. He died at his home in Los Angeles, on June 24, 2025, at age 81.

== Discography ==
=== Singles ===
- 1962: "Judy, You'll Never Know (I'll Never Tell You)"/"The Telegram" (Starcrest)
- 1963: "I Want to Hear It from Her"/"Nobody's Sweetheart" (Dot)
- 1964: "You Make Me Happy"/"Man Overboard" (Decca)
- 1965: "It Hurts Me"/"Give Me Your Word" (Decca) US No. 118, Canada No. 44
- 1965: "Hey Little Girl"/"Well, Allright" (Decca)
- 1965: "Anything Your Little Heart Desires"/Goody Galum-Shus" (Parkway)
- 1965: "Happiness Is"/"Can't Get Used to Losing You" (Cameo)
- 1967: "Cold Girl"/"Think Of Rain" (Epic)
- 1969: "Judy, You'll Never Know (I'll Never Tell You)"/"The Telegram" (Condor) (reissue)
- 1969: "Little Woman"/"One Too Many Mornings" (Metromedia), US No. 3, RIAA certification Gold, Canada No. 2
- 1969: "La La La (If I Had You)"/"Time" (Metromedia), US No. 9, US AC No. 14, RIAA Gold, Canada No. 7
- 1970: "Jingle Bell Rock" (from the Christmas album)
- 1970: "Easy Come, Easy Go"/"Sounds Along the Way" (Metromedia), US No. 9, US AC No. 2, RIAA Gold, Canada No. 6
- 1970: "Hey, Mister Sun"/"Two Blind Minds" (Metromedia), US No. 24, US AC No. 3, Canada No. 19
- 1970: "Julie, Do Ya Love Me"/"Spend Some Time Lovin Me" (Metromedia), US No. 5, US AC No. 2, RIAA Gold, Canada No. 3
- 1971: "Goin' Home (Sing a Song of Christmas Cheer)"/"Love's What You're Getting for Christmas" (Metromedia), US CB No. 70
- 1971: "Cried Like a Baby"/"Is Anybody There" (Metromedia), US No. 16, US AC No. 9, Canada No. 10
- 1971: "The Drum"/"Free Now to Roam" (Metromedia), US No. 29, US AC No. 2, Canada No. 7
- 1971: "Waiting at the Bus Stop"/"Run Away" (Metromedia), US No. 54, Canada No. 31
- 1971: "Jennifer"/"Getting Together" (Metromedia), US No. 60, US AC No. 9, Canada No. 32
- 1972: "Together Again"/"Picture a Little Girl" (Metromedia), US No. 91, Canada No. 52
- 1972: "I Don't Believe in Magic"/"Just a Little While Longer" (Metromedia)
- 1972: "Early in the Morning"/"Unborn Lullabye" (Metromedia), US No. 113
- 1974: "Mr. Success"/"Runaway" (Janus)
- 1975: "Our Last Song Together"/"Sunshine Rose" (Janus), US CB No. 103, US AC No. 34

=== Original LPs ===
- 1969: Bobby Sherman (Metromedia), US No. 11, RIAA Gold
- 1970: Here Comes Bobby (Metromedia), US No. 10, RIAA Gold
- 1970: With Love, Bobby (Metromedia), US No. 20, RIAA Gold
- 1970: Christmas Album (Metromedia), US Christmas Albums No. 2, (see NOTE below)
- 1971: Portrait of Bobby (Metromedia), US No. 48
- 1971: Getting Together (Metromedia), US No. 71
- 1972: Just For You (Metromedia)

=== Compilation LPs ===
- 1971: Bobby Bobby Bobby (promo only) (Metromedia Special Products)
- 1972: Bobby Sherman's Greatest Hits (Metromedia), US No. 83
- 1972: Everything You Always Wanted To Know About Bobby Sherman (Superstar Records)
- 1975: Remembering You (Phase One) (This album contains 7 previously released songs (Mr. Success, Julie Do You Love Me, Runaway, Easy Come Easy Go, Early In The Morning, Cried Like A Baby, Our Last Song Together) and 5 new songs not available anywhere else (Beginnings Are Easy, Fresh Out Of Love, I'll Never Stop Singing My Song, Here With You, Just Ask Me I've Been There)).

=== CDs ===
- 1990: What Came Before (Teen Ager #622) ("Just For You" with bonus tracks)
- 1991: The Very Best of Bobby Sherman (Restless)
- 1992: Christmas Album (Restless)
- 1995: All-Time Greatest Hits (K-tel) (contains 2 previously unreleased songs, "Where There's A Heartache" and "I Can't Wait Until Tomorrow")
- 1995: Bobby Sherman (K-tel)
- 1995: Here Comes Bobby (K-tel)
- 1995: With Love, Bobby (K-tel)
- 1995: Portrait of Bobby (K-tel)
- 1995: Getting Together (K-tel)
- 1999: My Christmas Wish (KRB) (reissue of Christmas Album)
- 2000: The Very Best of Bobby Sherman (Varese)
- 2001: Here Comes Bobby / With Love, Bobby (Collectables Records) (2 albums on 1 CD)
- 2001: Bobby Sherman / Portrait of Bobby (Collectables Records) (2 albums on 1 CD)
- 2008: Just For You (K-tel)
- 2010: Love Songs (K-Tel)
- 2015: The Partridge Family: Missing Pieces (Bell) (one track is Bobby Sherman singing "Stephanie")
- 2017: Singles (Four-Teen) (contains 6 previously unreleased songs, "Stop The Music", "Old Girlfriends", "Over Here", "The New Girl In School", "Beautiful Doll" and "Today I Chipped A Piece Off Of The Sun")
