= Zager and Evans =

American rock-pop duo

- Origin: Lincoln, Nebraska, U.S.
- Genres: Psychedelic pop; folk rock; psychedelic rock
- Years active: 1962–1971
- Labels: RCA Victor; White Whale; Vanguard
- Past members: Denny Zager; Rick Evans; Danny Schindler; Mark Dalton; Paul Maher; Dave Trupp

Zager and Evans was an American rock-pop duo active during the late 1960s and early 1970s, comprising Denny Zager (born February 14, 1944, Wymore, Nebraska) and Rick Evans (born January 20, 1943, Lincoln, Nebraska; died February 2018, Santa Fe, New Mexico). They are best known for their 1969 No. 1 hit single "In the Year 2525", which earned them one-hit wonder status.

== History ==
Denny Zager and Rick Evans met at Nebraska Wesleyan University in 1962. They were joined by drummer Danny Schindler (later of the Benders) in the Nebraska band the Eccentrics until Schindler's tour of Vietnam in 1965. Evans also left in 1965 and reunited with Zager in 1968.

As Zager and Evans, the duo were backed by another Nebraska native, Mark Dalton, on bass. Their first drummer, Paul Maher, was later replaced by another Nebraskan, Dave Trupp. Trupp and Dalton were also the rhythm section in the Liberation Blues Band and backed Evans on some solo demo material prior to Zager and Evans's recording of "In the Year 2525" in 1968.

== "In the Year 2525" ==
Written by Evans, "In the Year 2525 (Exordium & Terminus)" warned of the dangers of technology, portraying a future in which the human race was destroyed by its own technological and medical innovations. The last stanzas of the song suggest mankind undergoes a continuing cycle of birth, death, and rebirth.

"In the Year 2525" hit number one on the Billboard Hot 100 in 1969, ultimately claiming the top spot for six weeks. It also hit No. 1 in the UK and No. 2 in Australia. The song topped the charts at the time of two major cultural events: the first Moon landing on July 20, 1969 and the Woodstock Music Festival a month later. The record sold over four million copies by 1970 and was awarded a gold disc by the Recording Industry Association of America (RIAA) in July 1969.

"2525" was originally written in 1964, but not recorded or released until 1968 on the Truth Records label. After radio stations in Lincoln and Omaha made "2525" a regional "break-out" hit record, RCA Records signed the duo and released the song with "Little Kids", also written by Evans, as the B-side nationwide. Zager and Evans also immediately recorded an album of the same name, again using Trupp and Dalton as the primary rhythm section. Sales of the original hit recording, including singles sales, album usage and compilation inclusions, are estimated at over ten million worldwide. In Italy, the duo released an Italian version on RCA Victor 1583: "Nell'anno 2033" b/w "Donna" ("Woman").

== Later recordings ==
Zager and Evans are considered to be an archetypal one-hit wonder. Despite the success of "2525", the follow-up single, "Mr. Turnkey", failed to chart in the US and UK, as did subsequent releases. For many years, the duo was the only act to have a chart-topping hit on both sides of the Atlantic and never have another chart single in Billboard or the UK (until the Canadian band Magic! in 2013). Their third single, "Listen to the People", appeared on the Cashbox chart at No. 100, while "Mr. Turnkey"/"Cary Lynn Javes" (double A-side) and "Help One Man Today" both charted in Australia, at No. 86 and No. 94 respectively.

After the success of "2525", White Whale Records released an LP titled The Early Writings of Zager & Evans and Others featuring recordings of the Eccentrics on side one and a band called J.K. and Co., who had no connection to Zager and Evans, on side two. After releasing two albums on RCA, Zager and Evans moved to Vanguard Records in 1971 for a final record, titled Food for the Mind.

Evans later released an album for Truth Records titled I Need This Song, a duet with Pam Herbert. In the late 1970s, he formed his own label, Fun Records, and released an album titled Fun Songs, Think Songs containing both new material and re-recordings of Zager and Evans material.

== Later careers ==
Zager went on to teach guitar and he builds custom guitars at Zager Guitars in Lincoln, Nebraska.

Evans largely retired from public life but he continued to chat online with Dalton and his best friend, Nashville producer Gary Earl, until his death in February 2018.

Drummer Dave Trupp died in November 2015 at the age of 72.

Mark Dalton still performs on bass in the Pacific Northwest of the United States.

== Discography ==
=== Albums ===
Year	Album	Peak chart positions		Record Label
Year	Album	US	CAN	Record Label
1969	2525 (Exordium & Terminus)	30	7	RCA Victor
1969	The Early Writings of Zager & Evans and Others	—	—	White Whale Records
1970	Zager & Evans	—	—	RCA Victor
1971	Food for the Mind	—	—	Vanguard Records
"—" denotes releases that did not chart or were not released in that territory.

=== Singles ===
Year	Title	Peak chart positions						Record Label	B-side	Album
Year	Title	US	US A/C	UK	AUS	CAN	CAN A/C	Record Label	B-side	Album
1969	"In the Year 2525 (Exordium & Terminus)"	1	1	1	2	1	1	RCA Victor	"Little Kids"	2525 (Exordium & Terminus)
1969	"Mr. Turnkey"	106	—	—	86	48	41	RCA Victor	"Cary Lynn Javes"	Zager & Evans
1969	"Listen to the People"	—	—	—	—	96	—	RCA Victor	"She Never Sleeps Beside Me"	Zager & Evans
1970	"Help One Man Today"	—	—	—	94	—	—	RCA Victor	"Yeah 3^{2}"	
1970	"Crutches"	—	—	—	—	—	—	RCA Victor	"Plastic Park"	Zager & Evans
1971	"Hydra 15,000"	—	—	—	—	—	—	Vanguard Records	"I Am"	Food for the Mind
"—" denotes releases that did not chart or were not released in that territory.
