= Love Theme from Romeo and Juliet =

Single by Henry Mancini

- Sheet music cover for vocal version

Song
- Released: 1969
- Genre: Pop; easy listening
- Songwriter: Nino Rota

"Love Theme from Romeo and Juliet" is an instrumental recording by Henry Mancini, based on Nino Rota's music written for Franco Zeffirelli's 1968 film Romeo and Juliet. It became a number 1 hit on Billboard magazine's Hot 100 and Easy Listening charts. A vocal version of the song, often titled or subtitled "A Time for Us", was recorded by many other artists and became an Easy Listening hit for Johnny Mathis.

== Origins ==
Romeo and Juliet was released in the UK in March 1968. The original soundtrack album did not have tracks titled "Love Theme from Romeo and Juliet" or "A Time for Us", but the 1968 Shirley Bassey album This Is My Life had the latter of the two, crediting songwriters Larry Kusik, Eddie Snyder and the composer of the score for the film, Nino Rota.

Henry Mancini saw the Zeffirelli film in late 1968 and later said, "[I]n the background was this lovely piece of music. I left the movie very impressed with the score, and I started asking …why this hasn't been recorded." In The Billboard Book of Number One Hits, Fred Bronson wrote, "Mancini finally discovered there had been one recording of the main theme, which disappeared without a trace. He decided to arrange his own version, and include it in an album he was recording at the time."

== Henry Mancini version ==
"Love Theme from Romeo and Juliet"

Single by Henry Mancini

from the album A Warm Shade of Ivory
- B-side: "The Windmills of Your Mind"
- Released: May 1969
- Recorded: December 14, 1968
- Genre: Pop; easy listening
- Length: 2:29
- Label: RCA Victor
- Producer: Joe Reisman

Henry Mancini singles chronology
"Wait Until Dark" (1967)	"Love Theme from Romeo and Juliet" (1969)	"Theme from "Love Story" (1970)

Official audio
- "Love Theme from Romeo and Juliet" on YouTube

Henry Mancini, His Orchestra and Chorus recorded his arrangement as "Love Theme from Romeo and Juliet" on December 14, 1968, for his album A Warm Shade of Ivory with Joe Reisman producing. Mancini was the piano soloist. Hal Blaine was the drummer.

Tom Breihan of Stereogum wrote that Mancini's version

is grander and less subtle than the one that Rota recorded. On Rota's soundtrack, that music is pretty quiet and simple. It starts out as a mournful English horn, answered back by a harp. When the strings come in, they leave plenty of empty space. Mancini instead plays that central melody on piano, and he surrounds it with strings and drums and strummy guitars and choral wailing.

=== Release and commercial performance ===
Another track from A Warm Shade of Ivory, "The Windmills of Your Mind", was to be released as a single, and Mancini was asked which track should be used as the B-side. He chose "Love Theme from Romeo and Juliet", thinking it was another song that radio stations might play. Bronson explained that "an Orlando, Florida, top 40 station started playing it one night and received so many requests that they put the song into heavy airplay rotation. From there, the record spread to other top 40 stations." Mancini said, "It was very soft for its time. Some of the big (stations) refused to put it on until it became number one because it wasn't a hard rocker."

"Love Theme from Romeo and Juliet" debuted on Billboard magazine's Hot 100 and Easy Listening charts in the issue dated May 10, 1969. It reached number 1 Easy Listening four weeks later, in the June 7 issue, and stayed at the top for a total of eight weeks, making it his only number one on that chart. It spent two weeks at number 1 on the Hot 100 that began in the June 28 issue, ending the five-week run of "Get Back" by the Beatles as the top song. It was also his only top 10 single on that chart. In Canada, it reached number 2 on RPM magazine's list of most popular singles and number 1 Easy Listening. It reached number 4 in South Africa, number 3 in the Philippines and number 10 in Spain.

=== Critical reception ===
In their review of A Warm Shade of Ivory in 1969, the editors of Billboard described "Love Theme from Romeo and Juliet" as "[o]utstanding". On a scale of 1 to 10, Breihan gave the song a 5 in his retrospective review and wrote,

It's still an affecting piece of music, one that evokes the whole tragic-lost-love idea. It's easy enough to understand why a '60s audience, one that had already been raised on instrumental easy-listening music, would be drawn to a piece of music like that. It's less clear how that piece of music managed to top the charts when the Beatles and Creedence Clearwater Revival and Marvin Gaye were running hot, but I guess that's the '60s for you. Nothing made sense.

=== Charts ===
==== Weekly charts ====
Weekly chart performance for "Love Theme from Romeo and Juliet" by Henry Mancini, His Orchestra and Chorus
Chart (1969)	Peak position
Canada RPM Easy Listening	1
Canada RPM Top Singles	2
Philippines	3
Spain	10
South Africa (Springbok Radio)	4
US Billboard Easy Listening	1
US Billboard Hot 100	1

=== Year-end charts ===
Year-end chart performance for "Love Theme from Romeo and Juliet" by Henry Mancini, His Orchestra and Chorus
Chart (1969)	Position
US Billboard Easy Listening	2
US Billboard Hot 100	15

=== Certifications ===
Certifications and sales for "Love Theme from Romeo and Juliet" by Henry Mancini, His Orchestra and Chorus
Region	Certification	Certified units/sales
United States (RIAA)	Gold	1,000,000^{^}
^{^} Shipments figures based on certification alone.

=== Grammy award and nominations ===
At the 12th Annual Grammy Awards on March 11, 1970, Mancini won for Best Instrumental Arrangement. He was also nominated for Best Contemporary Instrumental Performance and Record of the Year. Kusik, Snyder and Rota were nominated as the songwriters in the Song of the Year category.

=== Aftermath ===
In his book Henry Mancini: Reinventing Film Music, John Caps explained how the success of the song caused Mancini to shift away from scoring films and toward recording "meek and subdued piano/orchestra Muzak albums" that were "very far afield from his cool-jazz past".

== Johnny Mathis version ==
"Love Theme from Romeo and Juliet (A Time for Us)"

Single by Johnny Mathis

from the album Love Theme from "Romeo And Juliet" (A Time for Us)
- B-side: "The World I Threw Away"
- Released: June 18, 1969
- Recorded: June 5, 1969
- Genre: Pop
- Length: 2:58
- Label: Columbia
- Composer: Nino Rota
- Lyricists: Larry Kusik; Eddie Snyder
- Producer: Jack Gold

Johnny Mathis singles chronology
"I'll Never Fall in Love Again" (1969)	"Love Theme from Romeo and Juliet (A Time for Us)" (1969)	"Midnight Cowboy" (1969)

Music video
- "Love Theme from Romeo and Juliet (A Time for Us)" on YouTube

Johnny Mathis recorded the song with the lyrics by Kusik and Snyder as "Love Theme from Romeo and Juliet (A Time for Us)" on June 5, 1969. It was produced by Jack Gold and released as a single two weeks later, on June 19.

=== Chart performance ===
The Mathis recording of "Love Theme from Romeo and Juliet (A Time for Us)" made its first appearance on Billboard's Easy Listening chart in the July 5, 1969, issue and spent 13 weeks there, during which time it got as high as number 8. It debuted on the Billboard Hot 100 three weeks later, in the July 26 issue, and peaked at number 96 over the course of three weeks. In Canada's RPM magazine, it reached number 93 pop and number 18 Easy Listening.

=== Critical reception ===
The editors of Billboard described the Mathis recording as "[e]loquent". The editors of Cash Box called it "[e]xcellent" and wrote, "Mathis's reading … should make this the decisive vocal version of the hit." Derek Johnson of New Musical Express described it as "a beautiful melody, receiving an impeccably smooth performance by Johnny Mathis, with a scoring of celeste, horns, strings and heavenly voices."

=== Charts ===
Weekly chart performance for "Love Theme from Romeo and Juliet (A Time for Us)" by Johnny Mathis
Chart (1969)	Peak position
Canada RPM Easy Listening	18
Canada RPM Top Singles	93
US Billboard Easy Listening	8
US Billboard Hot 100	96

== Cover versions ==
=== Billboard reviews ===
Various versions of "Love Theme from Romeo and Juliet" and "A Time for Us" have been praised by the editors of Billboard in reviews of the albums or singles on which they appear, most of which came out in 1969. The single of "A Time for Us" by Teresa Graves had a "[f]ascinating vocal reading". The version on the album Hurt So Bad by The Lettermen was "unusually arranged". The song was described as a "highlight" on the Mel Tormé album that included both titles in its name: A Time for Us (Love Theme from Romeo and Juliet). In their review of John Davidson's My Cherie Amour album, they wrote that he was "at his ballad best … with his sensitivity for 'A Time for Us'". They called it one of the "[g]ems to remember" on Carmen Cavallaro's Love Can Make You Happy.

Listing "Love Theme from Romeo and Juliet" as an example on Mantovani's 1969 album The World of Mantovani, the editors of Billboard wrote, "Those fascinating strings, those tastefully arranged and well produced tunes are all here." Regarding the version on Lawrence Welk's Jean, they wrote, "In his inimitable styling, he adds a touch of beauty, a touch of romance to tunes like 'Love Theme from Romeo and Juliet'". It was described as a "[h]ighlight" on Love Token by the Mystic Moods Orchestra. In their review of Jean by Ray Conniff and the Singers, they wrote, "Conniff's arrangements for his orchestra and chorus bring added luster to such pop familiars as … 'A Time for Us'." On Romeo and Juliet – A Theme for Lovers, Jackie Gleason "blends strings, horns, vibes and rhythm with a pervading solo trumpet" that "brings added pleasure to such new hits as the title song". The song was one of the "standouts" on Al De Lory Plays Midnight Cowboy. The Midnight String Quartet gave an "inimitable treatment" of the song on Rhapsodies for Young Lovers, Volume Three.

Billboard editors also mentioned the song in reviews of albums from 1970, such as Dizzy Gillespie's Cornucopia: "The impeccable trumpet of Gillespie darts and flurries its way through familiar chart items such as … 'Romeo and Juliet'." In their review of 50 Guitars for Midnight Lovers by the 50 Guitars of Tommy Garrett, they wrote, "Blending the old with the new, their Pete King treatments of 'Twilight Time', 'Close to You' and 'Love Theme from Romeo and Juliet' are just a few of the highlights."

=== Cash Box reviews ===
Cash Box editors highlighted a few 1969 recordings of the song, one of which was by pianist Roger Williams and released as a single; they wrote, "Beautiful theme from the movie is handled delicately by Roger Williams in a haunting ballad offering." In a review of the single by Astrud Gilberto, they described her performance as "splendid". On the A Time for Us album by Jack Jones, they called the title cut a "[s]tandout".

=== AllMusic reviews ===
AllMusic critics praised covers of the song in retrospective reviews. Regarding Engelbert Humperdinck's 1969 album Engelbert, Jason Elias wrote that the song had the singer's "commitment rising above the ornate and overly theatrical arrangement." Reviewing a reissue of the 1969 Get Together with Andy Williams album, William Ruhlmann felt that "A Time for Us" was one of the songs that was a better fit for Williams. Lindsay Planer reviewed Arthur Lyman's 1969 album Today's Great Hits and wrote, "The beguiling 'Love Theme from Romeo and Juliet' benefits from an ethereal vibrato as it seeps through the song's enchanting and lyrical verses." Joe Viglione was unimpressed by Stevie Wonder's performance of the song on 1970's Stevie Wonder Live: "'Love Theme from Romeo and Juliet' is something for the day and foreign to the future live shows of the eventual multi-Grammy award winner."

AllMusic critics also highlighted the song in contemporary reviews. Luciano Pavarotti recorded an Italian version of the song, "Ai Giochi Addio" ("Goodbye to the Games"), featuring lyrics by Elsa Morante, for his 2003 album Ti Adoro. In his review of the album, James Manheim wrote, "An adaptation of Nino Rota's old 'Love Theme from Romeo and Juliet' will please Three Tenors fans." In 2006, Margaret Reges wrote that, on Kenny G's I'm in the Mood For Love...The Most Romantic Melodies of All Time, his "squealing improvisation on 'Love Theme from Romeo and Juliet' is a little over the top". Another Italian version, "Un Giorno Per Noi" ("A Day for Us"), was recorded by Paul Potts for his 2009 album Passione. Heather Phares described it as a track on which he "shines".

== Old Money ==
The Lana Del Rey song "Old Money" on her third studio album, Ultraviolence (2013), includes an interpolation of the "Love Theme from Romeo and Juliet", featuring lyrics by Del Rey (credited as Elizabeth Woolridge Grant), Robert John Ellis Fitzsimmons and Daniel Law Heath. Anne Helen Petersen of BuzzFeed called her recording "exquisite".

== See also ==
- Romeo and Juliet (1968 film soundtrack)

== Bibliography ==
- Bronson, Fred (1992), The Billboard Book of Number One Hits - revised & enlarged, New York: Billboard Books, p. 255, ISBN 0-8230-8298-9
- Caps, John (2012), Henry Mancini: Reinventing Film Music, University of Illinois Press, ISBN 978-0-252-09384-5
- O'Neil, Thomas (1999), The Grammys, Perigree Books, ISBN 0-399-52477-0
