= In the Year 2525 =

"In the Year 2525 (Exordium & Terminus)"
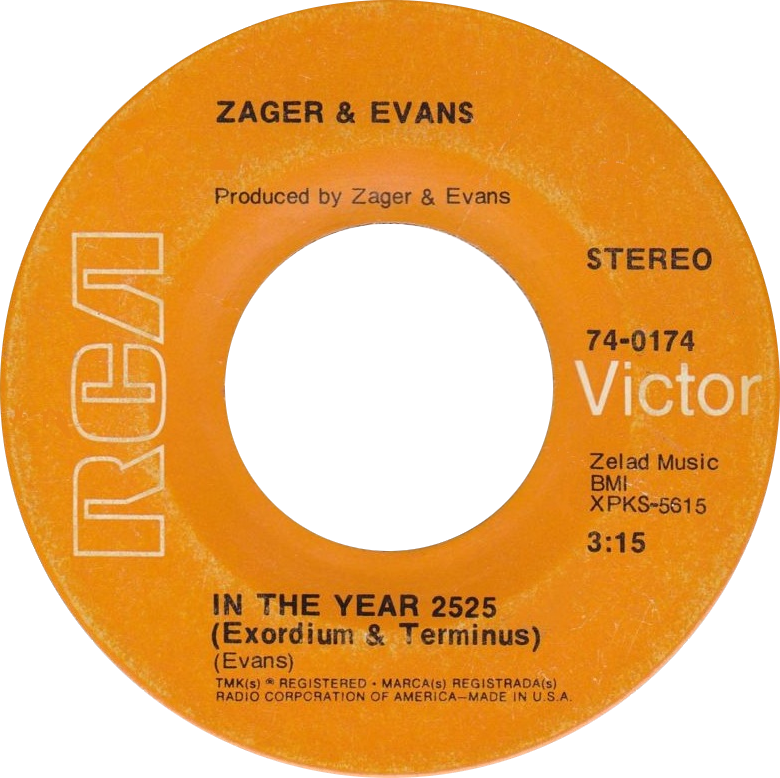
- RCA release

Single by Zager and Evans

from the album 2525 (Exordium & Terminus)
- B-side: "Little Kids"
- Released: 1969 (Truth label); April 1969 (RCA label)
- Recorded: 1969, Odessa, Texas
- Genre: Folk rock
- Length: 3:10 (Truth label); 3:15 (RCA label)
- Label: Truth; RCA Victor
- Songwriter: Rick Evans
- Producer: Zager and Evans

Zager and Evans singles chronology
"In the Year 2525 (Exordium & Terminus)" (1969)	"Mr. Turnkey" (1969)

Alternative release
- Artwork for the German vinyl single

"In the Year 2525 (Exordium & Terminus)" is a 1969 hit song by the American pop-rock duo of Zager and Evans. A "one-hit wonder", it reached No. 1 on the Billboard Hot 100 for six weeks starting July 12, 1969. It peaked at No. 1 in the UK Singles Chart for three weeks in August and September that year. The song was written and composed by Rick Evans in 1964 and released on Truth Records in 1968. It was picked up by RCA Records.

Their follow-up single on RCA Victor, "Mr. Turnkey", reached No. 48 in the Canadian pop charts and number 41 in the Canadian AC chart. Another single, "Listen to the People", charted at No. 100 and No. 96 in Canada.

== Summary ==
"In the Year 2525" is a song about the journey of mankind over a 7,000-year span: 2525, 3535, 4545, 5555, 6565, 7510, 8510, and 9595. It predicts that humanity's thoughts, relationships and bodies will be negatively impacted by technological advances and ends with mankind's extinction.

== Production ==
The song was produced by Tommy Allsup. Allsup played lead guitar as a member of Buddy Holly's band The Crickets. While touring in 1959 with Buddy Holly, Ritchie Valens, and J.P. "The Big Bopper" Richardson, he lost a fateful coin toss with Valens for a seat on the plane that crashed, killing Valens, Holly, Richardson, and pilot Roger Peterson on February 3, 1959 (The Day the Music Died).

== Recording ==
The song was recorded in 1968, at a studio in a cow pasture in Odessa, Texas.

=== Personnel ===
- Denny Zager & Rick Evans – acoustic guitars & vocals
- Mark Dalton – bass guitar
- Dave Trupp – drums
- The Odessa Symphony – additional instruments
- Tommy Allsup – producer

The record had regional success so RCA Records picked it up for a national release. RCA producer Ethel Gabriel was tasked with enhancing the sound and arrangement. Once it made the Hot 100, the track took three weeks to reach number 1.

== Cultural significance ==
In 2001, following the September 11 attacks, the song was included in the Clear Channel memorandum which was distributed to radio station owned by Clear Channel Communications, listing 165 songs considered to be "lyrically questionable." A cover version of the song with modified lyrics performed by the actress Gina Torres was used as the theme song for the syndicated American science fiction television series Cleopatra 2525.

== Charts ==
=== Weekly charts ===
Charts (1969–1970)	Peak position
Australia (Kent Music Report)	2
Canada (RPM) Top Singles	1
Canada (RPM) Adult Contemporary	1
Ireland (IRMA)	1
Italy (FIMI)	47
New Zealand (Listener)	1
UK	1
US Billboard Hot 100	1
US Billboard Adult Contemporary	1
US Cash Box Top 100	1
West-Germany [Gfk]	1

=== Year-end charts ===
Chart (1969)	Rank
Australia	32
Canada	15
UK	12
US Billboard Hot 100	26
US Billboard Easy Listening	37
US Cash Box Top 100	11
West-Germany	15

== Certifications ==
Region	Certification	Certified units/sales
United States (RIAA)	Gold	1,000,000^{^}
^{^} Shipments figures based on certification alone.

== See also ==
- 26th century
- Brave New World
- Dystopia
- Human extinction
- Human impact on the environment
- Anthropocene
- List of one-hit wonders on the UK Singles Chart
- List of one-hit wonders in the United States
