= 1970 in music =

List of notable events in music that took place in the year 1970.

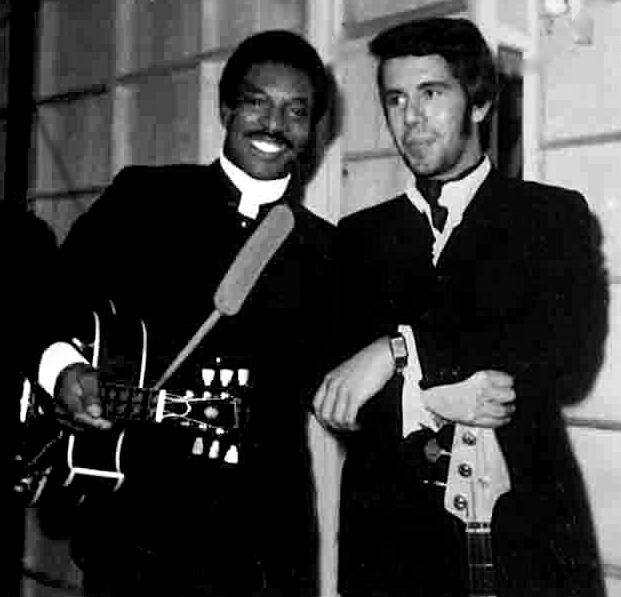
American soul singer Wilson Pickett with Pino Presti (1970)

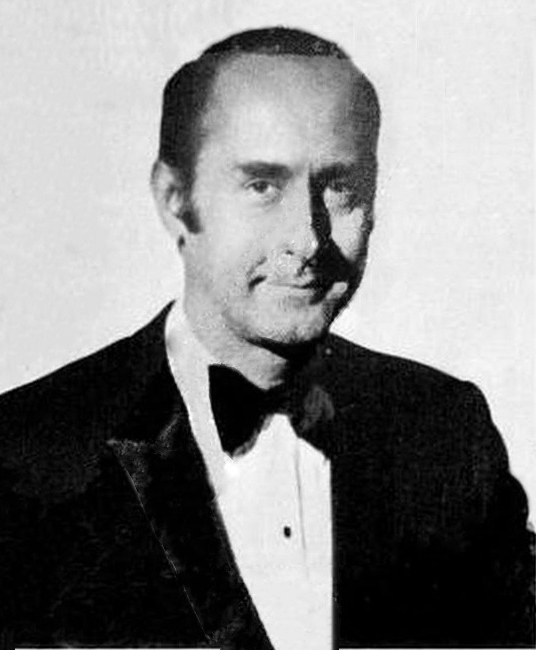
Henry Mancini in 1970

== Specific locations ==
- 1970 in British music
- 1970 in Japanese music
- 1970 in Norwegian music
- 1970 in Scandinavian music

== Specific genres ==
- 1970 in country music
- 1970 in heavy metal music
- 1970 in jazz
- 1970 in progressive rock

== Events ==
- January 3 – Ex-Pink Floyd frontman Syd Barrett releases his first solo album The Madcap Laughs.
- January 4 – The Who drummer Keith Moon fatally runs over his chauffeur with his Bentley trying to escape a mob outside a pub. The death is later ruled an accident.
- January 7 – Max Yasgur, owner of the Bethel, New York farm where the 1969 Woodstock Festival was held, is sued for $35,000 in property damages by neighboring farmers.
- January 9 – Led Zeppelin performs at The Royal Albert Hall. John Bonham plays a fifteen-minute rendition of "Moby Dick".
- January 14 – Diana Ross and the Supremes perform for the last time together at the Frontier Hotel in Las Vegas.
- January 16 – John Lennon's London art gallery exhibit of lithographs, Bag One, is shut down by Scotland Yard for displaying "erotic lithographs".
- January 24 – James "Shep" Sheppard, of The Heartbeats and Shep and the Limelites, is found murdered in his car on the Long Island Expressway.
- January 26 – Simon & Garfunkel release their final album together, Bridge over Troubled Water. The title track and album stay #1 on the Billboard charts for six weeks and go on to win a record six Grammys at the 13th Grammy Awards, including "Record of the Year", "Song of the Year", and "Album of the Year." In Britain it tops the album chart at regular intervals over the next two years, and becomes the best-selling album in Britain during the 1970s.
- January 27 – Miles Davis makes the final recordings for his experimental album Circle in the Round, featuring sitar and tabla.
- January 28 – The newly formed Band of Gypsies breaks up when guitarist Jimi Hendrix walks out after playing just two songs, telling the audience "I'm sorry we just can't get it together".
- February 11 – The film The Magic Christian, starring Peter Sellers and Ringo Starr, is premiered in New York City. The film's soundtrack album, including Badfinger's "Come and Get It" (written and produced by Paul McCartney), is released on Apple Records.
- February 13 – English band Black Sabbath release their self titled debut album in the U.K., credited as the first major album in the heavy metal genre.
- February 14 – The Who record their live album Live at Leeds in Yorkshire, England. The Grateful Dead plays an equally historic concert on the same date at the Fillmore East, New York City.
- February 17 – Joni Mitchell announces that she is retiring from live performances, following her show at London's Royal Albert Hall. She would be back performing concerts within a year.
- February 23 – Ringo Starr appears on the television show Rowan & Martin's Laugh-In.
- February 27 – Jefferson Airplane is fined $1,000 for using profanity during a concert in Oklahoma City, Oklahoma.
- February 28 – Elvis Presley performed at the Houston Astrodome. The King of Rock and Roll broke previous attendance records with a crowd of 36,299 - which was 10,000 more than the previous record.
- February 28 – Led Zeppelin perform in Copenhagen under the pseudonym The Nobs, to avoid a threatened lawsuit by Count Eva von Zeppelin, descendant of airship designer Ferdinand von Zeppelin.
- March 4 – Janis Joplin is fined $200 for using obscene language during a concert performance in Tampa, Florida.
- March 6 – Cult leader and suspected murderer Charles Manson releases an album titled Lie: The Love and Terror Cult to help finance his defense.
- March 7 – Mountain, one of the many bands credited as having influence in the development of heavy metal music, releases Climbing!, their debut album.
- March 11 – The 12th Annual Grammy Awards are presented in Chicago, Los Angeles, Nashville, New York and Atlanta. Blood, Sweat & Tears' self-titled album wins Album of the Year, The 5th Dimension's "Aquarius/Let the Sunshine In" wins Record of the Year and Joe South's "Games People Play" wins Song of the Year. Crosby, Stills & Nash win Best New Artist.
- March 15 – West German pavilion at Expo '70 in Osaka features 5½ hours' daily live performances of the music of Karlheinz Stockhausen (to September 13).
- March 19 – David Bowie marries model Angela Barnett.
- March 21 – In Amsterdam, Dana wins the 15th annual Eurovision Song Contest for Ireland with the song All Kinds of Everything (music and lyrics by Derry Lindsay and Jackie Smith). She is elected to the European Parliament some 29 years later.
- March 25 – José José gives a masterful performance of the song "El Triste" at the "Latin Song Festival II", predecessor of the OTI Festival.
- March 26 – Peter Yarrow (of Peter, Paul and Mary) pleads guilty to "taking immoral liberties" with a 14-year-old girl in Washington, D.C., on August 31, 1969.
- April 2 – The London Magistrate's Court hears arguments on John Lennon's indecency summons for his exhibition of erotic lithographs during his art exhibit on January 16.
- April 3 – Minneapolis nightclub the Depot opens, eventually renamed to First Avenue.
- April 10 – Paul McCartney publicly announces that he has left The Beatles in a press release, written in mock-interview style, that is included in promotional copies of his first solo album and headlined in the Daily Mirror newspaper in the United Kingdom.
- April 14 – Michael Nesmith announces he has left The Monkees.
- April 17 – Johnny Cash performs at the White House at the invitation of President Richard M. Nixon.
- April 20 – Paul McCartney's first solo album, McCartney, is released.
- April 24 – Grace Slick of Jefferson Airplane is invited to a tea party at the White House by Tricia Nixon, daughter of U.S. President Richard Nixon. Slick arrives at the party with Abbie Hoffman, who is on trial for conspiring to riot at the 1968 Democratic National Convention. The pair planned to spike Nixon's tea cup with a heavy dose of LSD. Slick is recognized (although Hoffman is not) and told to leave because she is on the FBI list.
- May 4 – Charles Wuorinen, 32, becomes the youngest composer ever to win the Pulitzer Prize for Music.
- May 8 – The Beatles' last LP, Let It Be, is released.
- May 16
  - Randy Bachman leaves the Guess Who to start up Brave Belt.
  - The Who release Live at Leeds which is their first live album. Since its initial reception, Live at Leeds has been cited by several music critics as the best live rock recording of all time.
- May 20 – The Beatles' film Let It Be premières in London and Liverpool. None of the four band members are present at either screening.
- May 23–24 – Grateful Dead make their first British appearance at Hollywood Festival, Newcastle-under-Lyme, on a bill also featuring Black Sabbath, Free, and José Feliciano. Everyone is completely upstaged by the previously unknown Mungo Jerry, whose debut single "In the Summertime" becomes the best-selling hit of the year.
- June – Australian composer Peter Sculthorpe receives the MBE in the Queen's Birthday Honours.
- June 3 – The Kinks singer Ray Davies makes a 6000-mile round trip from New York to London and back- interrupting the band's American tour- to re-record one word on their latest single "Lola". In order to get any airplay in Great Britain he has to change the word "Coca-Cola" to a more subtle "cherry cola".
- June 7 – The Who play two shows of Tommy, at the New York Metropolitan Opera House.
- June 13
  - "The Long and Winding Road" becomes the Beatles' last U.S. Number 1 song, though it is never released as a single in Britain.
  - The Stooges play at the Cincinnati Pop Festival, Midsummer Rock.
- July 4 – The music countdown show American Top 40 debuts.
- July 17 – The Guess Who perform at the White House for President Nixon and his guest the Prince of Wales (now Charles III). At Pat Nixon's request, they do not play their breakthrough hit "American Woman" due to the song's supposed anti-American lyrics.
- July 26 – Guitarist Jimi Hendrix plays at his hometown of Seattle at Sicks Stadium where, under the influence of drugs, he starts verbally abusing members of the audience.
- August – Release in the United States of the album Songs of the Humpback Whale produced by Roger Payne, publicly demonstrating whale vocalization for the first time. It becomes an unexpected bestseller and influential in public support for whale conservation.
- August 3 – Janis Joplin makes her final TV appearance, on the Dick Cavett Show.
- August 26–30 – The Isle of Wight Festival 1970 takes place on East Afton Farm off the coast of England. Some 600,000 people attend the largest rock festival of all time. Artists include The Moody Blues, Jimi Hendrix, The Who, The Doors, Chicago, Leonard Cohen, Miles Davis, Richie Havens, John Sebastian, Joan Baez, Ten Years After, Emerson, Lake & Palmer and Jethro Tull.
- August 30 – The Rolling Stones open their European tour in Malmö, Sweden.
- September 6 – During his final European tour, guitarist Jimi Hendrix is greeted by booing and jeering by German fans as a result of his late appearance on stage and incoherent stage performance. Bassist Billy Cox quits the tour and returns to the United States.
- September 16 – Jimi Hendrix makes his last appearance, with Eric Burdon & War jamming at Ronnie Scott's Club in London.
- September 18 – Death of Jimi Hendrix: Jimi Hendrix, aged 27, dies from a barbiturate overdose at his London hotel.
- October 4 – Janis Joplin, aged 27, is found dead from a heroin overdose in her bedroom in the Landmark Motor Hotel in Hollywood.
- October 10 – Newly independent Fiji adopts God Bless Fiji as its national anthem.
- October 30 – Jim Morrison of The Doors, found guilty of indecent exposure and profanity because of his behavior during a March 1, 1969, concert, is sentenced to eight months of hard labor and a $500 fine.
- November 9 – The blues rock studio double album Layla and Other Assorted Love Songs, the only album by Derek and the Dominos, is released, initially in the United States, the first presentation of the classic title track, "Layla", by English guitarist Eric Clapton and American drummer Jim Gordon.
- November 12 – After Yehudi Menuhin accepts honorary citizenship from Switzerland, he receives a letter from the United States State Department telling him that both he and his son will lose their US citizenship as a result.
- November 20 – The Kinks singer Ray Davies flies to a London studio to re-record one word in a new Kinks single for the second time in 1970. This time, he has to change a line in "Apeman"- "The air pollution is a-foggin' up my eyes" which sounds too much like "a-fuckin'".
- November 23 – The Electric Factory concert venue in Philadelphia, Pennsylvania' closes its doors.
- December 8 – John Lennon conducts a lengthy and intensely candid interview with Jann Wenner of Rolling Stone magazine. He discusses his new solo album and the influence of primal therapy on its creation, as well as his personal traumas dating back to childhood. He also makes many revelations about his time in The Beatles, including his account of the group's breakup.
- December 12 – The Doors play their final concert with singer Jim Morrison at The Warehouse in New Orleans, Louisiana. After the concert The Doors decide that they will not play live anymore due to Morrison's unpredictable live persona.
- December 31 – Paul McCartney files a lawsuit against the other members of The Beatles to dissolve their partnership, formally ending the band after 10 years.
- Undated
  - Seiji Ozawa is named the music director of the San Francisco Symphony Orchestra.

== Bands formed ==
- See Musical groups established in 1970

== Bands disbanded ==
- The Beatles break up permanently.
- The Nice disband.
- Bonzo Dog Doo-Dah Band split, with reunions in 1972, 1988, and 2006.
- Simon & Garfunkel – both members of the duo go on to solo careers, although they have reunited and performed together numerous times since breaking up.
- The Turtles (reform in 1983)
- Dave Clark 5 Many members would leave and new members formed 'Dave Clark & Friends' which lasted until 1973.

== Albums released ==
In 1970, 4,000 albums and 5,700 singles were released in the US.

=== January ===
| Day | Album | Artist | Notes |
|---|---|---|---|
| 2 | The Madcap Laughs | Syd Barrett | Solo Debut |
| 5 | Here's Loretta Singing "Wings Upon Your Horns" | Loretta Lynn | - |
| 7 | Tony Sings the Great Hits of Today! | Tony Bennett | - |
| 8 | That's the Way Love Is | Marvin Gaye | - |
| 9 | Magic Christian Music | Badfinger | Debut |
| 9 | On the Boards | Taste | - |
| 15 | Back in the USA | MC5 | - |
| 15 | A Brand New Me | Dusty Springfield | - |
| 15 | This Girl's in Love with You | Aretha Franklin | - |
| 16 | New Routes | Lulu | - |
| 19 | Hello, I'm Johnny Cash | Johnny Cash | - |
| 19 | John B. Sebastian | John Sebastian | Album recorded autumn 1968 |
| 23 | A Song for Me | Family | - |
| 23 | Jeremy Spencer | Jeremy Spencer | Solo Debut |
| 25 | John Phillips (John, the Wolf King of L.A.) | John Phillips | Solo Debut |
| 25 | Frijid Pink | Frijid Pink | Debut |
| 26 | Bridge over Troubled Water | Simon & Garfunkel | - |
| 26 | Chicago | Chicago | aka Chicago II |
| 27 | Moondance | Van Morrison | - |
| - | Ain't It Funky | James Brown | - |
| - | American Woman | The Guess Who | - |
| - | Argent | Argent | Debut |
| - | Barbra Streisand's Greatest Hits | Barbra Streisand | Compilation |
| - | Big Band Sound | Jo Stafford | Compilation |
| - | Flat Baroque and Berserk | Roy Harper | - |
| - | The Grass Is Greener | Colosseum | US only |
| - | In Concert at the Troubadour, 1969 | Ricky Nelson | Live |
| - | Kool and the Gang | Kool and the Gang | Debut |
| - | Liberation Music Orchestra | Charlie Haden | Debut |
| - | One Day at a Time | Joan Baez | - |
| - | Redbone | Redbone | - |
| - | Something's Burning | Kenny Rogers and The First Edition | - |
| - | Stone the Crows | Stone the Crows | Debut |
| - | Try a Little Kindness | Glen Campbell | - |
| - | Waylon | Waylon Jennings | - |

=== February ===
| Day | Album | Artist | Notes |
|---|---|---|---|
| 1 | The Delfonics | The Delfonics | - |
| 1 | Sweet Baby James | James Taylor | - |
| 9 | Burnt Weeny Sandwich | The Mothers of Invention | - |
| 9 | Morrison Hotel | The Doors | - |
| 13 | Black Sabbath | Black Sabbath | Debut/UK; released June 1970 in US |
| 24 | Funkadelic | Funkadelic | - |
| 26 | Hey Jude | The Beatles | Compilation; aka The Beatles Again |
| 27 | Shazam | The Move | - |
| - | The American Revolution | David Peel and The Lower East Side Band | - |
| - | Atomic Roooster | Atomic Rooster | Debut |
| - | Dragonfly (Strawbs album) | Strawbs | - |
| - | The Great Songs of Roy Orbison | Roy Orbison | Compilation |
| - | Greatest Hits | Phil Ochs | - |
| - | Knef | Hildegard Knef | - |
| - | The Least We Can Do Is Wave to Each Other | Van der Graaf Generator | - |
| - | Lord Sutch and Heavy Friends | Screaming Lord Sutch | Debut |
| - | Masterpiece | The Masters Apprentices | - |
| - | My Prescription | Bobby Womack | - |
| - | Nilsson Sings Newman | Harry Nilsson | Randy Newman compositions |
| - | Robin's Reign | Robin Gibb | - |
| - | Stormbringer! | John Martyn and Beverley Martyn | - |
| - | Tin Tin | Tin Tin | Debut/UK |
| - | Uncle Charlie & His Dog Teddy | Nitty Gritty Dirt Band | - |

=== March ===
| Day | Album | Artist | Notes |
|---|---|---|---|
| 6 | Lie: The Love and Terror Cult | Charles Manson | recorded 1967–'68 |
| 6 | Psychedelic Shack | The Temptations | - |
| 6 | Stevie Wonder Live | Stevie Wonder | - |
| 7 | Climbing! | Mountain | Debut |
| 8 | Get into Something | The Isley Brothers | - |
| 9 | Porter Wayne and Dolly Rebecca | Porter Wagoner and Dolly Parton | - |
| 11 | Déjà Vu | Crosby, Stills, Nash & Young | - |
| 13 | A Beard of Stars | Tyrannosaurus Rex | - |
| 13 | Egg | Egg | Debut |
| 23 | Leon Russell | Leon Russell | - |
| 25 | Band of Gypsys | Jimi Hendrix | Live |
| 25 | Vintage Violence | John Cale | - |
| 27 | Easy Action | Alice Cooper | - |
| 27 | First Step | Faces | - |
| 27 | Sentimental Journey | Ringo Starr | Solo Debut |
| 30 | Bitches Brew | Miles Davis | - |
| 30 | Ginger Baker's Air Force | Ginger Baker's Air Force | Live |
| 31 | Bloodrock | Bloodrock | - |
| 31 | It Ain't Easy | Three Dog Night | - |
| - | Both Sides Now | Willie Nelson | - |
| - | Cold Fact | Sixto Rodriguez | - |
| - | Don't Think Twice | Waylon Jennings | - |
| - | Desperado | Pat Martino | - |
| - | Elastic Rock | Nucleus | - |
| - | Empty Rooms | John Mayall | - |
| - | Magick Brother | Gong | Debut |
| - | Manal | Manal | - |
| - | Marriage on the Rocks/Rock Bottom | The Amboy Dukes | - |
| - | Mona - The Carnivorous Circus | Mick Farren | - |
| - | Morning Way | Trader Horne | - |
| - | On Tour with Eric Clapton | Delaney & Bonnie | Live |
| - | Sacrifice | Black Widow | Debut |
| - | Still Waters Run Deep | Four Tops | - |
| - | Tom Rush | Tom Rush | - |
| - | Travelin' | Tommy James and the Shondells | - |
| - | Watertown | Frank Sinatra | - |

=== April ===
| Day | Album | Artist | Notes |
|---|---|---|---|
| 1 | Ladies of the Canyon | Joni Mitchell | - |
| 6 | Fancy | Bobbie Gentry | - |
| 9 | Remedies | Dr. John | - |
| 10 | Elton John | Elton John | Second Album |
| 10 | Getting to This | Blodwyn Pig | - |
| 11 | Zabriskie Point | Various Artists | Soundtrack, US Release |
| 13 | Farewell | Diana Ross & The Supremes | Live |
| 13 | Silk Purse | Linda Ronstadt | - |
| 17 | Brinsley Schwarz | Brinsley Schwarz | - |
| 17 | Cricklewood Green | Ten Years After | - |
| 17 | McCartney | Paul McCartney | Solo Debut |
| 22 | Earth Rot | David Axelrod | |
| 22 | Live | Iron Butterfly | Live |
| 24 | Benefit | Jethro Tull | - |
| 24 | Mona Bone Jakon | Cat Stevens | - |
| 25 | Raw Sienna | Savoy Brown | US/Canada |
| 26 | Right On | The Supremes | - |
| 27 | I'll Never Fall in Love Again | Dionne Warwick | - |
| 27 | Tammy's Touch | Tammy Wynette | - |
| 28 | What Love Has...Joined Together | Smokey Robinson & the Miracles | - |
| - | 12 Songs | Randy Newman | - |
| - | Ananda Shankar | Ananda Shankar | - |
| - | Burrito Deluxe | The Flying Burrito Brothers | - |
| - | Candles in the Rain | Melanie | - |
| - | CJ Fish | Country Joe and the Fish | - |
| - | Come Together | Ike & Tina Turner | - |
| - | Cucumber Castle | Bee Gees | - |
| - | Eric Burdon Declares "War" | Eric Burdon & War | - |
| - | I Looked Up | Incredible String Band | - |
| - | The Isaac Hayes Movement | Isaac Hayes | - |
| - | Live Cream | Cream | Live 1968 + 1 studio outtake |
| - | McLemore Avenue | Booker T. & the M.G.s | instrumental covers LP of Abbey Road |
| - | My Kind of Jazz | Ray Charles | - |
| - | Oh Happy Day | Glen Campbell | - |
| - | Open | Blues Image | - |
| - | Portrait | The 5th Dimension | - |
| - | Sit Down Young Stranger | Gordon Lightfoot | - |
| - | Soul on Top | James Brown | - |
| - | Ton-Ton Macoute! | Johnny Jenkins | - |
| - | Yeti | Amon Düül II | - |
| - | Zero She Flies | Al Stewart | - |

=== May ===
| Day | Album | Artist | Notes |
|---|---|---|---|
| 6 | Poco | Poco | - |
| 8 | ABC | The Jackson 5 | - |
| 8 | Let It Be | The Beatles | - |
| 11 | Live at Leeds | The Who | Live |
| 11 | Woodstock: Music from the Original Soundtrack and More | Various Artists | Soundtrack |
| 15 | In the Wake of Poseidon | King Crimson | - |
| 25 | King Kong: Jean-Luc Ponty Plays the Music of Frank Zappa | Jean-Luc Ponty | - |
| – | Country and West | Dottie West | - |
| – | The Electric Lucifer | Bruce Haack | - |
| – | Friend's Friend's Friend | Audience | - |
| – | Honey Come Back | Patti Page | - |
| – | Hot Tuna | Hot Tuna | Live |
| – | Live in London | The Beach Boys | Live |
| – | Pop Makes Progress | Tony Coe with Robert Farnon | - |
| – | Primordial Lovers | Essra Mohawk | - |
| – | Quatermass | Quatermass | - |
| – | Red Clay | Freddie Hubbard | - |
| – | Take Me to Tomorrow | John Denver | - |
| – | Thank Christ for the Bomb | The Groundhogs | - |
| – | Toe Fat | Toe Fat | Debut |
| – | Trapeze | Trapeze | Debut |
| – | Will You Visit Me on Sunday? | George Jones | - |
| – | The World of Johnny Cash | Johnny Cash | - |
| – | Writer | Carole King | - |

=== June ===
| Day | Album | Artist | Notes |
|---|---|---|---|
| 5 | Barclay James Harvest | Barclay James Harvest | Debut |
| 5 | Deep Purple in Rock | Deep Purple | - |
| 5 | Home | Procol Harum | - |
| 6 | Third | Soft Machine | - |
| 8 | Loretta Lynn Writes 'Em & Sings 'Em | Loretta Lynn | Compilation |
| 8 | Self Portrait | Bob Dylan | - |
| 12 | Accept | Chicken Shack | - |
| 12 | Christine Perfect | Christine McVie | Debut |
| 12 | Gasoline Alley | Rod Stewart | - |
| 14 | Workingman's Dead | Grateful Dead | - |
| 15 | Closer to Home | Grand Funk Railroad | - |
| 19 | Diana Ross | Diana Ross | Solo Debut |
| 19 | ... Very 'Eavy ... Very 'Umble | Uriah Heep | Debut |
| 23 | On Stage | Elvis Presley | Live |
| 26 | Fire and Water | Free | - |
| 26 | Melody Fair | Lulu | - |
| 30 | Changes | The Monkees | - |
| - | Blood, Sweat & Tears 3 | Blood, Sweat & Tears | - |
| - | Canned Heat '70 Concert Live in Europe | Canned Heat | UK |
| - | Chilliwack | Chilliwack | - |
| - | Ecology | Rare Earth | - |
| - | Electronic Meditation | Tangerine Dream | - |
| - | Everything I Play Is Funky | Lou Donaldson | - |
| - | Five Bridges | The Nice | |
| - | Fotheringay | Fotheringay | - |
| - | Hark! The Village Wait | Steeleye Span | - |
| - | It's a New Day - Let a Man Come In | James Brown | - |
| - | Kristofferson | Kris Kristofferson | - |
| - | The Last Poets | The Last Poets | - |
| - | Lorca | Tim Buckley | |
| - | Love Country Style | Ray Charles | |
| - | Magnetic South | Michael Nesmith | - |
| - | Marrying Maiden | It's A Beautiful Day | - |
| - | Memphis | Petula Clark | - |
| - | Norwood | Glen Campbell | Soundtrack |
| - | The Other Side of Abbey Road | George Benson | |
| - | Parachute | The Pretty Things | - |
| - | Sing Brother Sing | Edgar Broughton Band | - |
| - | Struttin' | The Meters | - |
| - | Them Changes | Buddy Miles | - |
| - | Vehicle | Ides of March | - |

=== July ===
| Day | Album | Artist | Notes |
|---|---|---|---|
| 1 | Cactus | Cactus | Debut |
| 1 | Everything Is Everything | Donny Hathaway | - |
| 3 | Sweet Inspiration | Cilla Black | - |
| 7 | Fun House | The Stooges | - |
| 7 | Osmium | Parliament | - |
| 8 | Cosmo's Factory | Creedence Clearwater Revival | |
| 17 | Gracious | Gracious! | Debut |
| 20 | Absolutely Live | The Doors | Live |
| 22 | Don't Crush That Dwarf, Hand Me the Pliers | The Firesign Theatre | - |
| 24 | Live at London's Talk of the Town | The Temptations | Live |
| 24 | Time and a Word | Yes | - |
| 31 | It'll All Work Out in Boomland | T2 | Debut |
| - | Alone Together | Dave Mason | - |
| - | Devotion | John McLaughlin | - |
| - | Flamingo | Flamin' Groovies | - |
| - | Free Your Mind... and Your Ass Will Follow | Funkadelic | - |
| - | Full House | Fairport Convention | - |
| - | Green Is Beautiful | Grant Green | - |
| - | High Tide | High Tide | - |
| - | Humble Pie | Humble Pie | Third Album |
| - | James Gang Rides Again | James Gang | - |
| - | John Barleycorn Must Die | Traffic | - |
| - | The Last Puff | Spooky Tooth | - |
| - | Mungo Jerry | Mungo Jerry | US |
| - | Now I'm a Woman | Nancy Wilson | - |
| - | Number 5 | Steve Miller Band | - |
| - | On the Waters | Bread | - |
| - | Open Road | Donovan | - |
| - | Transition | John Coltrane | - |
| - | Willard | John Stewart | - |

=== August ===
| Day | Album | Artist | Notes |
|---|---|---|---|
| 3 | Future Blues | Canned Heat | - |
| 3 | Once More | Porter Wagoner and Dolly Parton | - |
| 7 | A Question of Balance | The Moody Blues | - |
| 7 | Signed, Sealed & Delivered | Stevie Wonder | - |
| 7 | War & Peace | Edwin Starr | - |
| 10 | Weasels Ripped My Flesh | The Mothers of Invention | - |
| 11 | Down to Earth | Jimmy Buffett | Debut |
| 12 | Chapter Two | Roberta Flack | - |
| 12 | Eric Clapton | Eric Clapton | Solo Debut |
| 13 | Metamorphosis | Iron Butterfly | - |
| 14 | Hawkwind | Hawkwind | Debut |
| 17 | Stage Fright | The Band | - |
| 19 | Close to You | Carpenters | - |
| 24 | Spirit in the Dark | Aretha Franklin | - |
| 25 | Here Comes Shuggie Otis | Shuggie Otis | Debut |
| 28 | Ma Kelly's Greasy Spoon | Status Quo | - |
| 31 | Sunflower | The Beach Boys | - |
| - | Supertramp | Supertramp | Debut |
| - | Band of Gold | Freda Payne | - |
| - | Bless Her Heart...I Love Her | Hank Locklin | - |
| - | Come Saturday Morning | The Sandpipers | - |
| - | Easy Does It | Al Kooper | - |
| - | From Home to Home | Fairfield Parlour | - |
| - | Golden Earring | Golden Earring | - |
| - | Hank Williams the Roy Orbison Way | Roy Orbison | - |
| - | Just for Love | Quicksilver Messenger Service | - |
| - | Mad Dogs & Englishmen | Joe Cocker | Live |
| - | Mongrel | The Bob Seger System | - |
| - | Perry Como in Person at the International Hotel, Las Vegas | Perry Como | Live |
| - | The Rill Thing | Little Richard | - |
| - | Something | Shirley Bassey | - |
| - | The Use of Ashes | Pearls Before Swine | - |
| - | A Woman Lives for Love | Wanda Jackson | - |

=== September ===
| Day | Album | Artist | Notes |
|---|---|---|---|
| 4 | Get Yer Ya-Ya's Out! The Rolling Stones in Concert | The Rolling Stones | Live |
| 4 | If I Could Do It All Over Again, I'd Do It All Over You | Caravan | - |
| 4 | Live on Blueberry Hill | Led Zeppelin | Live |
| 8 | Greatest Hits II | The Temptations | - |
| 8 | Natural Resources | Martha and the Vandellas | - |
| 8 | Third Album | The Jackson 5 | - |
| 11 | Doris Troy | Doris Troy | - |
| 11 | Encouraging Words | Billy Preston | - |
| 14 | Untitled | The Byrds | - |
| 15 | The Return of The Marvelettes | The Marvelettes | - |
| 18 | Kiln House | Fleetwood Mac | - |
| 18 | Paranoid | Black Sabbath | UK; released January 1971 in US |
| 19 | After the Gold Rush | Neil Young | - |
| 19 | Performance | Various Artists | Soundtrack |
| 23 | Abraxas | Santana | - |
| 23 | Come to My Garden | Minnie Riperton | - |
| 23 | Idlewild South | The Allman Brothers Band | - |
| 25 | Beaucoups of Blues | Ringo Starr | - |
| 25 | Mad Shadows | Mott the Hoople | |
| 26 | Leftover Wine | Melanie | Live (recorded at Carnegie Hall) |
| 30 | A Pocket Full of Miracles | The Miracles | - |
| - | Cowboy in Sweden | Lee Hazlewood | - |
| - | Curtis | Curtis Mayfield | - |
| - | Death Walks Behind You | Atomic Rooster | |
| - | Down Home | Seals and Crofts | - |
| - | Focus Plays Focus | Focus | Debut |
| - | Fôrça Bruta | Jorge Ben | - |
| - | The Glen Campbell Goodtime Album | Glen Campbell | - |
| - | Hello! The Osmond Brothers | The Osmonds | - |
| - | Johnny Winter And | Johnny Winter | - |
| - | Laying My Burdens Down | Willie Nelson | - |
| - | The Magnificent 7 | The Supremes & The Four Tops | - |
| - | The Original Human Being | Blue Cheer | - |
| - | Ptah, the El Daoud | Alice Coltrane | - |
| - | Runt | Todd Rundgren | Debut |
| - | Scorpio's Dance | Shocking Blue | - |
| - | Sex Machine | James Brown | Live (some tracks recorded in studio with added reverb) |
| - | The Time Is Near | Keef Hartley | - |
| - | To Bonnie from Delaney | Delaney & Bonnie | - |

=== October ===
| Day | Album | Artist | Notes |
|---|---|---|---|
| 2 | Atom Heart Mother | Pink Floyd | - |
| 5 | Bloodrock 2 | Bloodrock | - |
| 5 | Led Zeppelin III | Led Zeppelin | - |
| 5 | Share the Land | The Guess Who | - |
| 12 | Only for the Lonely | Mavis Staples | - |
| 14 | Tony Bennett's Something | Tony Bennett | - |
| 15 | Jackson 5 Christmas Album | The Jackson 5 | Christmas |
| 15 | Louis 'Country & Western' Armstrong | Louis Armstrong | - |
| 15 | Tap Root Manuscript | Neil Diamond | - |
| 16 | Jesus Christ Superstar | by Andrew Lloyd Webber and Tim Rice | - |
| 19 | The Johnny Cash Show | Johnny Cash | Live |
| 19 | New Feelin' | Liza Minnelli | - |
| 19 | Shades of Rock | The Shadows | - |
| 21 | New Morning | Bob Dylan | - |
| 23 | Chunga's Revenge | Frank Zappa | - |
| 23 | Manfred Mann Chapter Three Volume Two | Manfred Mann Chapter Three | - |
| 23 | Trespass | Genesis | - |
| 28 | Miles Davis at Fillmore | Miles Davis | Live |
| 30 | The Temptations Christmas Card | The Temptations | Christmas |
| 30 | Tumbleweed Connection | Elton John | - |
| 31 | Blows Against the Empire | Paul Kantner & Jefferson Starship | - |
| - | 2nd Time Around | The Spinners | - |
| - | Raw Material | Raw Material | Debut album of British Prog Band |
| - | Be a Brother | Big Brother and the Holding Company | - |
| - | Demon's Dance | Jackie McLean | - |
| - | The First Ten Years | Joan Baez | Compilation |
| - | Forever Yours | Dottie West | - |
| - | If | If | - |
| - | Indianola Mississippi Seeds | B.B. King | - |
| - | Just a Collection of Antiques and Curios | Strawbs | - |
| - | Lie Back and Enjoy It | Juicy Lucy | - |
| - | Looking In | Savoy Brown | - |
| - | Magma aka Kobaia | Magma | Also known as Kobaïa |
| - | Mama's Big Ones | Cass Elliot | Compilation |
| - | New Ways but Love Stays | The Supremes | - |
| - | The Partridge Family Album | The Partridge Family | - |
| - | Potlatch | Redbone | - |
| - | Shooting at the Moon | Kevin Ayers | - |
| - | Skid | Skid Row | - |
| - | Tapestry | Don McLean | Debut |
| - | U | Incredible String Band | - |
| - | UFO 1 | UFO | Debut |
| - | USA Union | John Mayall | - |
| - | Vintage Dead | Grateful Dead | Live |
| - | Washington County | Arlo Guthrie | - |
| - | Woodsmoke and Oranges | Paul Siebel | - |
| - | Wrong End of the Rainbow | Tom Rush | - |

=== November ===
| Day | Album | Artist | Notes |
|---|---|---|---|
| 1 | The New Birth | New Birth | - |
| 3 | Everything Is Everything | Diana Ross | - |
| 4 | The Man Who Sold The World | David Bowie | US |
| 9 | Layla and Other Assorted Love Songs | Derek and the Dominos | - |
| 9 | No Dice | Badfinger | US |
| 9 | Workin' Together | Ike & Tina Turner | - |
| 11 | That's the Way It Is | Elvis Presley | Soundtrack |
| 14 | Osmonds | The Osmonds | - |
| 16 | The J. Geils Band | The J. Geils Band | - |
| 16 | Live Album | Grand Funk Railroad | Live |
| 16 | Stephen Stills | Stephen Stills | - |
| 16 | A Tribute to the Best Damn Fiddle Player in the World (or, My Salute to Bob Wills) | Merle Haggard | - |
| 18 | Naturally | Three Dog Night | - |
| 20 | Despite It All | Brinsley Schwarz | - |
| 20 | Emerson, Lake & Palmer | Emerson, Lake & Palmer | Debut |
| 21 | Greatest Hits | Sly and the Family Stone | Compilation |
| 22 | Sugar | Stanley Turrentine | - |
| 23 | I Walk the Line | Johnny Cash | Soundtrack |
| 23 | Little Fauss and Big Halsy | Johnny Cash | Soundtrack |
| 23 | Tea for the Tillerman | Cat Stevens | - |
| 25 | Christmas and the Beads of Sweat | Laura Nyro | - |
| 27 | All Things Must Pass | George Harrison | - |
| 27 | Cruel Sister | Pentangle | - |
| 27 | Gentle Giant | Gentle Giant | Debut |
| 27 | Lola Versus Powerman and the Moneygoround, Part One | The Kinks | - |
| 27 | Twelve Dreams of Dr. Sardonicus | Spirit | - |
| 28 | ...To Be Continued | Isaac Hayes | - |
| 30 | 13 | The Doors | Compilation |
| – | 2 Years On | Bee Gees | - |
| – | Tombstone Valentine | Wigwam | |
| – | Afreaka! | Demon Fuzz | - |
| – | Air Conditioning | Curved Air | Debut |
| – | Almost in Love | Elvis Presley | - |
| – | American Beauty | Grateful Dead | - |
| – | The American Dream | Emitt Rhodes | Debut |
| – | Anyway | Family | - |
| – | Back Home | Chuck Berry | - |
| – | Barrett | Syd Barrett | - |
| – | Confessions of the Mind | The Hollies | - |
| – | Electric Byrd | Donald Byrd | - |
| – | His Band and the Street Choir | Van Morrison | - |
| – | Klopfzeichen | Kluster | Debut |
| – | Kraftwerk | Kraftwerk | Debut |
| – | Loaded | The Velvet Underground | - |
| – | Loose Salute | Michael Nesmith | - |
| – | McDonald and Giles | Ian McDonald and Michael Giles | |
| – | Medusa | Trapeze | - |
| – | Moon Man | Charles Lloyd | - |
| – | Mountains | Steamhammer | - |
| – | Nicely Out of Tune | Lindisfarne | - |
| – | Patto | Patto | Debut |
| – | Play It Loud | Slade | - |
| – | The Road to Ruin | John Martyn and Beverley Martyn | - |
| – | Scott Joplin: Piano Rags | Joshua Rifkin | - |
| – | Singer of Sad Songs | Waylon Jennings | - |
| – | Starsailor | Tim Buckley | - |
| – | Steppenwolf 7 | Steppenwolf | - |
| – | Tell It All Brother | Kenny Rogers and The First Edition | - |
| – | Tide | Antônio Carlos Jobim | - |
| – | Warhorse | Warhorse | - |
| – | Whales & Nightingales | Judy Collins | - |
| – | Words and Music | Jimmy Webb | - |
| – | The Worst of Jefferson Airplane | Jefferson Airplane | Compilation |

=== December ===
| Day | Album | Artist | Notes |
|---|---|---|---|
| 4 | The End of an Ear | Robert Wyatt | - |
| 4 | Wishbone Ash | Wishbone Ash | - |
| 9 | Pendulum | Creedence Clearwater Revival | - |
| 11 | John Lennon/Plastic Ono Band | John Lennon | - |
| 11 | Lizard | King Crimson | - |
| 11 | Looking On | The Move | - |
| 11 | Yoko Ono/Plastic Ono Band | Yoko Ono and Plastic Ono Band | - |
| 18 | T. Rex | T. Rex | - |
| 20 | Desertshore | Nico | - |
| 20 | Emitt Rhodes | Emmit Rhodes | - |
| 20 | Just Another Diamond Day | Vashti Bunyan | - |
| - | The Black-Man's Burdon | Eric Burdon and War | - |
| - | Daughter of Time | Colosseum | - |
| - | The End of the Game | Peter Green | - |
| - | False Start | Love | - |
| - | Fanny | Fanny | - |
| - | Ginger Baker's Air Force 2 | Ginger Baker's Air Force | - |
| - | H to He, Who Am the Only One | Van der Graaf Generator | - |
| - | Hey America | James Brown | - |
| - | Highway | Free | - |
| - | I Like Your Lovin' (Do You Like Mine?) | The Chi-Lites | - |
| - | Kingdom Come | Sir Lord Baltimore | - |
| - | Lick My Decals Off, Baby | Captain Beefheart & the Magic Band | - |
| - | Music Inspire by Lord of the Rings | Bo Hansson | - |
| - | Odetta Sings | Odetta | - |
| - | Ry Cooder | Ry Cooder | - |
| - | Soul Rebels | The Wailers | - |
| - | Think Pink | Twink | Debut/US |
| - | 'Til the Band Comes In | Scott Walker | - |
| - | Turn It Over | The Tony Williams Lifetime | - |
| - | Very Dionne | Dionne Warwick | - |
| - | Watt | Ten Years After | - |
| - | What About Me | Quicksilver Messenger Service | - |

=== Release date unknown ===
- 3 Shades of Blue - Johnny Hodges
- 4 Compositions for Sextet – Tony Oxley
- A Trip in the Country - Roger Miller
- Affenstunde - Popol Vuh
- Afternoon of a Georgia Faun - Marion Brown
- Again – Oliver
- Alive! - Grant Green
- Andy Williams' Greatest Hits – Andy Williams
- The Andy Williams Show – Andy Williams
- The Awakening - Ahmad Jamal
- Barrel – Lee Michaels
- The Big O – Roy Orbison
- Black Gold – Nina Simone
- Black on Black! - Sonny Phillips
- Bright Sun Is Shining – Barry Melton
- Bruce Cockburn - Bruce Cockburn
- The Candlestickmaker - Ron Elliott
- Canto libre – Víctor Jara
- Charlie Daniels (album) – Charlie Daniels
- Come On Down! - Eddie Harris
- Consciousness! - Eric Kloss
- Consummation - The Thad Jones/Mel Lewis Orchestra
- Copperfields – The Dillards
- Drives - Lonnie Smith
- East Bay Grease - Tower of Power
- Eastwood Rides Again - The Upsetters
- Ebony Woman - Billy Paul
- El Triste – José José
- Entrance – Edgar Winter
- Fat Mattress II - Fat Mattress
- Fools – Kenny Rogers and The First Edition
- Glass Harp - Glass Harp
- Good-byes and Butterflies – Five Man Electrical Band
- Good Vibes - The Natural Four
- Gravy Train - Gravy Train
- Gula Matari – Quincy Jones
- Gypsy - Gypsy
- Here It 'Tis - Johnny "Hammond" Smith
- Honey, Wheat and Laughter – Anne Murray
- I Am the Blues - Willie Dixon
- Intensified – Desmond Dekker & the Aces
- Iron Mountain Depot - John Hartford
- Joe Farrell Quartet - Joe Farrell
- The Jumpin' Blues - Dexter Gordon
- King of the Delta Blues Singers, Vol. II – Robert Johnson
- Legal – Gal Costa
- Loudon Wainwright III – Loudon Wainwright III
- Mashmakhan - Mashmakhan
- May Blitz - May Blitz
- Me & Jerry - Chet Atkins and Jerry Reed
- Moog Indigo - Jean-Jacques Perrey
- Muscle Shoals Nitty Gritty - Herbie Mann
- Other Afternoons – Jimmy Lyons
- Parallelograms - Linda Perhacs
- Pretty Things - Lou Donaldson
- Raindrops Keep Fallin' on My Head – Andy Williams
- Real Friends - The Friends of Distinction
- Revolution – The Dubliners
- Rick Sings Nelson – Ricky Nelson
- Right On – Wilson Pickett
- Rock Festival – The Youngbloods
- Roger Miller 1970 - Roger Miller
- Rose Garden – Lynn Anderson
- The Rubaiyat of Dorothy Ashby - Dorothy Ashby
- Seatrain – Seatrain
- Skinhead Moonstomp – Symarip
- Small Talk at 125th and Lenox – Gil Scott-Heron – Live
- Snowbird – Anne Murray
- Soul Liberation - Rusty Bryant
- Spaces - Larry Coryell
- Stone Flute - Herbie Mann
- Stoned Guitar - The Human Instinct
- Stonehenge – Richie Havens
- Subway to the Country - David Ackles
- Sugarloaf – Sugarloaf
- Tarkio - Brewer & Shipley
- Things Ain't What They Used to Be (And You Better Believe It) – Ella Fitzgerald
- Things We Like - Jack Bruce
- Tommy James - Tommy James
- Tony Joe – Tony Joe White
- We Went to Different Schools Together – the Jaggerz
- The Whispers - The Whispers
- Wilson Pickett in Philadelphia - Wilson Pickett

== Billboard Top popular records of 1970 ==
from Billboard December 26, 1970 - Record Talent Edition pg TA-30

"Top Records OF 1970 (Based on Billboard's Charts) The information compiled for the Top Records of 1970 is based on the weekly chart positioning and length of time records were on the respective charts from the Billboard issue dates of January 3 through November 28, 1970. These recaps, as well as the weekly charts, do not reflect actual sales figures. The ratings take into account the number of weeks the disk was on the chart, plus the weekly positions it held during its chart life. Each disk was given points accordingly for its respective chart, and in addition, the No. 1 disk each week was assigned bonus points equal to the total number of positions on its respective chart.

Unfortunately, Billboard's late December print deadline prevented approximately 60 records from completing their full chart runs, and their formula also included approximately 50 records from 1969, some of which had enough points to rank in the 1970 chart. Joel Whitburn's Records Research books, archived issues of Billboard for November–December 1969 and December 1970-March 1971, and Hot 100 Year-End formulas were used to complete the December 26 year-end chart reprinted here.

The completed chart is composed of records that entered the Billboard Hot 100 during November–December 1969 (only when the majority of chart weeks were in 1970), January to November–December 1970 (majority of chart weeks in 1970). Records with majority of chart weeks in 1969 or 1971 are included in the year-end charts for those years, respectively, and multiple appearances are not permitted. Each week fifteen points were awarded to the number one record, then nine points for number two, eight points for number three, and so on. The total points a record earned determined its year-end rank. The complete chart life of each record is represented, with number of points accrued. There are no ties, even when multiple records have the same number of points. The next ranking category is peak chart position, then weeks at peak chart position, weeks in top ten, weeks in top forty, and finally weeks on Hot 100 chart.

The chart can be sorted by Artist, Song title, Recording and Release dates, Cashbox year-end ranking (CB) or units sold (sales) by clicking on the column header. Additional details for each record can be accessed by clicking on the song title, and referring to the Infobox in the right column of the song page. Billboard also has chart summaries on its website. Cashbox rankings were derived by same process as the Billboard rankings. Sales information was derived from the RIAA's Gold and Platinum database, the BRIT Certified database and The Book of Golden Discs, but numbers listed should be regarded as estimates. Grammy Hall of Fame and National Recording Registry information with sources can be found on Wikipedia.

| Rank | Artist | Title | Label | Recorded | Release date | CB | Sales | Charts, Awards |
|---|---|---|---|---|---|---|---|---|
| 1 | Simon and Garfunkel | "Bridge over Troubled Water" | Columbia 4-45079 | November 1969 | January 20, 1970 | 4 | 3.25 | US Billboard 1970 #1, Hot100 #1 for 6 weeks, 14 total weeks, Grammy Hall of Fame 1998, National Recording Registry 2012, 264 points |
| 2 | B. J. Thomas | "Raindrops Keep Fallin' on My Head" | Scepter 12265 | June 1969 | October 1969 | 6 | 3.00 | US Billboard 1970 #2, Hot100 #1 for 4 weeks, 22 total weeks, Grammy Hall of Fame 2014 (CashBox ranking is 1969), 262 points. |
| 3 | The Jackson 5 | "I'll Be There" | Motown 1171 | June 1970 | August 28, 1970 | 2 | 2.00 | US Billboard 1970 #3, Hot100 #1 for 5 weeks, 16 total weeks, Grammy Hall of Fame 2011, 259 points |
| 4 | The Carpenters | "(They Long To Be) Close to You" | A&M 1183 | March 24, 1970 | May 20, 1970 | 13 | 3.00 | US Billboard 1970 #4, Hot100 #1 for 4 weeks, 17 total weeks, Grammy Hall of Fame 2000, 242 points |
| 5 | George Harrison | "My Sweet Lord" | Apple 2995 | May 28, 1970 | November 23, 1970 | 1 | 10.00 | US Billboard 1970 #5, Hot100 #1 for 4 weeks, 14 total weeks, 238 points |
| 6 | The Beatles | "Let It Be" | Apple 2764 | January 4, 1970 | March 11, 1970 | 5 | 3.00 | US Billboard 1970 #6, Hot100 #1 for 2 weeks, 14 total weeks, Grammy Hall of Fame 2004, 226 points |
| 7 | The Partridge Family | "I Think I Love You" | Bell 910 | May 28, 1970 | August 22, 1970 | 3 | 3.25 | US Billboard 1970 #7, Hot100 #1 for 3 weeks, 19 total weeks, 225 points |
| 8 | The Guess Who | "American Woman" | RCA Victor 74-0325 | August 13, 1969 | March 1970 | 10 | 2.00 | US Billboard 1970 #11, Hot100 #1 for 3 weeks, 15 total weeks, 201 points |
| 9 | Smokey Robinson and the Miracles | "The Tears of a Clown" | Tamla 54199 | November 1966 | September 24, 1970 | 11 | 1.50 | US Billboard 1970 #8, Hot100 #1 for 2 weeks, 16 total weeks, 200 points |
| 10 | The Jackson 5 | "I Want You Back" | Motown 1157 | September 1969 | October 6, 1969 | 14 | 1.25 | US Billboard 1970 #10, Hot100 #1 for 1 week, 19 total weeks (CashBox ranking is 1969), 198 points |
| 11 | Edwin Starr | "War" | Gordy 7101 | May 1970 | June 10, 1970 | 9 | 3.00 | US Billboard 1970 #9, Hot100 #1 for 3 weeks, 15 total weeks, Grammy Hall of Fame 1999, 196 points |
| 12 | Diana Ross | "Ain't No Mountain High Enough" | Motown 1169 | March 18, 1970 | July 16, 1970 | 17 | 2.25 | US Billboard 1970 #12, Hot100 #1 for 3 weeks, 14 total weeks, 194 points |
| 13 | The Jackson 5 | "ABC" | Motown 1163 | December 1969 | February 24, 1970 | 6 | 1.50 | US Billboard 1970 #13, Hot100 #1 for 2 weeks, 13 total weeks, Grammy Hall of Fame 2017, 191 points |
| 14 | Three Dog Night | "Mama Told Me (Not to Come)" | Dunhill 45-4239 | 1970 | May 1970 | 15 | 1.50 | US Billboard 1970 #14, Hot100 #1 for 2 weeks, 15 total weeks, 187 points |
| 15 | Bread | "Make It With You" | Elektra 45686 | March 1970 | April 1970 | 16 | 1.50 | US Billboard 1970 #16, Hot100 #1 for 1 weeks, 17 total weeks, 185 points |
| 16 | The Jackson 5 | "The Love You Save" | Motown 1169 | March 1970 | May 13, 1970 | 25 | 1.25 | US Billboard 1970 #15, Hot100 #1 for 2 weeks, 14 total weeks, 183 points |
| 17 | The Fifth Dimension | "One Less Bell to Answer" | Bell 940 | March 1970 | April 1970 | 14 | 1.25 | US Billboard 1970 #17, Hot100 #2 for 2 weeks, 19 total weeks, 179 points |
| 18 | The Carpenters | "We've Only Just Begun" | A&M 1217 | June 13, 1970 | August 21, 1970 | 20 | 2.00 | US Billboard 1970 #18, Hot100 #2 for 4 weeks, 17 total weeks, Grammy Hall of Fame 1998, 176 points |
| 19 | The Shocking Blue | "Venus" | Colossus 108 | May 1969 | November 1969 | 7 | 5.00 | US Billboard 1970 #19, Hot100 #1 for 1 week, 14 total weeks, 165 points |
| 20 | The Beatles | "The Long and Winding Road" | Apple 2832 | January 26, 1969 | May 11, 1970 | 19 | 1.50 | US Billboard 1970 #20, Hot100 #1 for 2 weeks, 10 total weeks, 147 points |
| 21 | Neil Diamond | "Cracklin' Rosie" | Uni 55250 | November 4, 1968 | July 30, 1970 | 26 | 6.00 | US Billboard 1970 #21, Hot100 #1 for 2 weeks, 15 total weeks, 147 points |
| 22 | James Taylor | "Fire and Rain" | Warner Bros. 7423 | December 1969 | August 1970 | 37 | 1.50 | US Billboard 1970 #22, Hot100 #3 for 3 weeks, 16 total weeks, 147 points, Grammy Hall of Fame 1998 |
| 23 | John Ono Lennon | "Instant Karma (We All Shine On)" | Apple 1818 | January 27, 1970 | February 6, 1970 | 22 | 2.00 | US Billboard 1970 #23, Hot100 #1 for 2 weeks, 13 total weeks, 147 points |
| 24 | Sly and the Family Stone | "Thank You (Falettinme Be Mice Elf Agin)" | Epic 5-10555 | May 1969 | December 1969 | 18 | 1.25 | US Billboard 1970 #24, Hot100 #1 for 2 weeks, 13 total weeks, 146 points, Grammy Hall of Fame 2017 |
| 25 | Norman Greenbaum | "Spirit In the Sky" | Reprise 0885 | 1968 | January 1970 | 8 | 2.00 | US Billboard 1970 #25, Hot100 #3 for 3 weeks, 15 total weeks, 146 points |
| 26 | The Temptations | "Ball of Confusion (That's What the World Is Today)" | Gordy 7099 | April 14, 1970 | May 7, 1970 | 28 | 1.25 | US Billboard 1970 #26, Hot100 #3 for 3 week, 15 total weeks, US R&B 1965 #4, R&B #1 for 6 weeks, 16 total weeks, 142 points |
| 27 | Freda Payne | "Band of Gold" | Invictus 9075 | Jan 1970 | February 1970 | 32 | 1.00 | US Billboard 1970 #27, Hot100 #3 for 1 weeks, 20 total weeks, 142 points |
| 28 | Dawn | "Candida" | Bell 903 | May 1970 | July 1970 | 29 | 2.00 | US Billboard 1970 #28, Hot100 #3 for 2 weeks, 18 total weeks, 138 points |
| 29 | Ray Stevens | "Everything Is Beautiful" | Barnaby 2011 | 1970 | March 1970 | 35 | 1.00 | US Billboard 1970 #29, Hot100 #1 for 2 weeks, 13 total weeks, 137 points |
| 30 | Stevie Wonder | "Signed, Sealed, Delivered (I'm Yours)" | Tamla 54196 | May 1970 | June 3, 1970 | 21 | 3.00 | US Billboard 1970 #30, Hot100 #3 for 2 weeks, 14 total weeks, 131 points |

== Top 40 Chart hit singles ==
| Song title | Artist(s) | Release date(s) | US | UK | Highest chart position | Other Chart Performance(s) |
|---|---|---|---|---|---|---|
| "ABC" | The Jackson 5 | February 1970 | 1 | 8 | 1 (United States) | 1 (U.S. Billboard Best Selling Soul Singles) - 14 (Australia) - 24 (Belgian) |
| "After Midnight" | Eric Clapton | October 1970 | 18 | 99 | 9 (Canada) | See chart performance entry |
| "Ain't It Funky Now (Part 1)" | James Brown | Released in 1969; Charted in '69/'70 | 24 | n/a | 24 (United States) | 3 (U.S. Billboard Best Soul Singles) |
| "Ain't No Mountain High Enough" | Diana Ross | April 1970 | 1 | 6 | 1 (United States) | See chart performance entry |
| "Airport Love Theme (Gwen & Vern)" | Vincent Bell & Orchestra | April 1970 | 31 | n/a | 4 (Australia) | 2 (U.S. Billboard Adult Contemporary) |
| "All Right Now" | Free | May 1970 | 4 | 2 | 1 (Denmark, Sweden) | See chart performance entry |
| "Always Something There to Remind Me" | R. B. Greaves | February 1970 | 27 | n/a | 12 (Canada) | 3 (U.S. Billboard Easy Listening Chart) - 48 (Australia) |
| "Amazing Grace" | Judy Collins | December 1970 | 15 | 5 | 5 (United Kingdom) | 5 (U.S. Billboard Adult Contemporary) - 10 (Australia) |
| "American Woman" | The Guess Who | March 1970 | 1 | 19 | 1 (Canada, United States) | 1 (U.S. Cash Box Top Singles) - 4 (Switzerland, Netherlands [Dutch Charts]) - 7 (Austria) - 16 (New Zealand) - 43 (Australia) |
| "Amos Moses" | Jerry Reed | October 1970 | 8 | n/a | 2 (Canada) | 16 (U.S. Billboard Hot Country Songs) - 34 (Australia) |
| "Are You Ready?" | Pacific Gas & Electric | April 1970 | 14 | n/a | 1 (Belgium) | 2 (Netherlands [Dutch Top 40] / Netherlands [Single Top 100]) - 9 (Switzerlands) - 16 (West Germany) - 19 (Italy) - 44 (Australia) |
| "Arizona" | Mark Lindsay | February 1970 | 10 | n/a | 2 (New Zealand) | 3 (South Africa) - 4 (Canada) - 9 (U.S. Cash Box Top 100) - 10 (Australia) - 15 (Canada RPM Adult Contemporary) - 16 (U.S. Billboard Easy Listening) |
| "As the Years Go By" | Mashmakhan | June 1970 | 31 | n/a | 1 (Canada, Japan) | 75 (Australia) |
| "Baby Take Me in Your Arms" | Jefferson | Released in 1969; Charted in '69/'70 | 23 | n/a | 15 (Canada) | 14 (Canadian Adult Contemporary) - 19 (US Billboard Adult Contemporary) - 19 (US Cash Box Top 100) - 19 (US Record World Top 100) |
| "Be My Baby" | Andy Kim | Released in 1969; Charted in '69/'70 | 9 | n/a | 1 (Canada) | 1 (Australia) - 31 (US Billboard Adult Contemporary) |
| "Big Yellow Taxi" | Joni Mitchell | April 1970 | 67 | 11 | 6 (Australia) | 14 (Canada) - 19 (Netherlands) - 33 (US Billboard Easy Listening) |
| "Black Magic Woman" | Santana | November 1970 | 4 | n/a | 4 (Canada, United States) | 14 (West Germany) - 16 (Austria) - 29 (US Billboard Adult Contemporary) - 38 (Belgium) |
| "Black Night" | Deep Purple | June 1970 | 66 | 2 | 1 (Belgium, Switzerland) | See Chart Performance Entry |
| "Candida" | Tony Orlando and Dawn | July 1970 | 3 | 9 | 1 (7 countries) | See Chart Performance Entry |
| "Cecilia" | Simon & Garfunkel | April 1970 | 3 | n/a | 1 (Argentina, Netherlands, United States) | See Chart Performance Entry |
| "Come And Get It" | Badfinger | Released in 1969; Charted in '69/'70 | 7 | 4 | 1 (New Zealand) | 4 (Canada) - 5 (Ireland) - 6 (US Cash Box Top 100) - 14 (Australia) |
| "Cottonfields" | The Beach Boys | April 1970 | n/a | 5 | 1 (Australia, Norway) | See Chart Performance Entry |
| "Cry Me a River" | Joe Cocker | November 1970 | 11 | n/a | 7 (France) | 13 (Netherlands) - 15 (Belgium, Canada) - 45 (Australia) |
| "Does Anybody Really Know What Time It Is" | Chicago | October 1970 | 7 | n/a | 2 (Canada) | 5 (US Billboard Adult Contemporary) - 5 (US Cash Box Top 100) - 17 (New Zealand) - 35 (Australia) |
| "Domino" | Van Morrison | November 1970 | 9 | n/a | 8 (Canada) | 9 (US Cash Box Top 100) - 22 (Netherlands) |
| "Easy Come, Easy Go" | Bobby Sherman | January 1970 | 9 | n/a | 6 (Canada) | 2 (Canada CHUM Chart) - 2 (US Billboard Easy Listening) - 7 (Canada RPM Adult) - 7 (US Cash Box Top 100) |
| "El Condor Pasa" | Simon & Garfunkel | September 1970 | 18 | n/a | 1 (7 countries) | See Chart Performance Entry |
| "For the Good Times" | Ray Price | June 1970 | 11 | n/a | 11 (United States) | See Chart Performance Entry |
| "Get Ready" | Rare Earth | February 1970 | 4 | n/a | 1 (Canada) | See Chart Performance Entry |
| "Get Up (I Feel Like Being a) Sex Machine" | James Brown | July 1970 | 15 | 32 | 4 (Belgium) | See Chart Performance Entry |
| "Gimme Dat Ding" | The Pipkins | May 1970 | 9 | 6 | 1 (New Zealand) | 7 (Canada) - 7 (Ireland) - 7 (US Cash Box Top 100) - 8 (Netherlands) - 15 (South Africa) - 20 (US Billboard Easy Listening) - 61 (Australia) |
| "Give Me Just a Little More Time" | Chairmen of the Board | January 1970 | 3 | 3 | 3 (UK, US) | 8 (US Billboard R&B) - 9 (Canada) - 9 (US Cash Box Top 100) - 90 (Australia) |
| "The Green Manalishi (With the Two-Prong Crown)" | Fleetwood Mac | May 1970 | n/a | 10 | 6 (Netherlands) | 14 (Ireland) - 16 (West Germany) |
| "Gypsy Woman" | Brian Hyland | June 1970 | 3 | 42 | 3 (Canada) | 3 (US Cash Box Top 100) - 4 (South Africa) - 9 (Australia) - 61 (Italy) |
| "Hand Me Down World" | The Guess Who | June 1970 | 17 | n/a | 10 (Canada) | 13 (US Cash Box Top 100) - 65 (Australia) |
| "He Ain't Heavy, He's My Brother" | Neil Diamond | November 1970 | 20 | n/a | 18 (New Zealand) | 4 (US Billboard Adult Contemporary) - 94 (Australia) |
| "He Ain't Heavy, He's My Brother" | The Hollies | Released in 1969; Charted in '69/'70 | 7 | 3 | 1 (South Africa) | See Chart Performance Entry |
| "Heaven Help Us All" | Stevie Wonder | September 1970 | 9 | 29 | 9 (United States) | 2 (US Billboard R&B) - 9 (US Cash Box Top 100) - 14 (Canada) - 88 (Australia) |
| "Hey, Mister Sun" | Bobby Sherman | May 1980 | 24 | n/a | 19 (Canada) | 3 (US Billboard Easy Listening) - 7 (Canada CHUM 30) |
| "Hitchin' a Ride" | Vanity Fare | Released in 1969; Charted in '69/'70 | 5 | 16 | 2 (South Africa) | 3 (Canada) - 4 (US Cash Box Top 100) - 22 (US Billboard Easy Listening) - 24 (Australia) |
| "Holly Holy" | Neil Diamond | Released in 1969; Charted in '69/'70 | 6 | n/a | 2 (Canada, South Africa) | 4 (US Cash Box Top 100) - 6 (Australia, Canada, New Zealand) |
| "Honey Come Back" | Glen Campbell | January 1970 | 19 | 4 | 2 (Ireland) | See Chart Performance Entry |
| "House of the Rising Sun" | Frijid Pink | Released in 1969; Charted in '69/'70 | 7 | 4 | 1 (Norway, West Germany) | See Chart Performance Entry |
| "I (Who Have Nothing)" | Tom Jones | August 1970 | 14 | 16 | 6 (Belgium) | 2 (US Billboard Adult Contemporary) - 10 (Canada) - 21 (Belgium) |
| "I Hear You Knocking" | Dave Edmunds | November 1970 | 4 | 1 | 1 (Ireland, United Kingdom) | 3 (Canada, Germany) - 4 (US Cash Box Top 100) - 6 (Australia) |
| "I Just Can't Help Believing" | B. J. Thomas | June 1970 | 9 | n/a | 9 (United Kingdom) | 1 (US Billboard Adult Contemporary) - 11 (US Cash Box Top 100) - 18 (Canada) |
| "If You Could Read My Mind" | Gordon Lightfoot | November 1970 | 5 | 30 | 1 (Canada) | See Chart Performance Entry |
| "Immigrant Song" | Led Zeppelin | November 1970 | 16 | n/a | 2 (Canada) | See Chart Performance Entry |
| "Indiana Wants Me" | R. Dean Taylor | August 1970 | 5 | 2 | 2 (Canada, Ireland, UK) | See Chart Performance Entry |
| "It Don't Matter to Me" | Bread | September 1970 | 10 | n/a | 6 (Canada) | 2 (US Billboard Easy Listening) - 7 (US Cash Box Top 100) - 19 (New Zealand) - 29 (Australia) |
| "It's a Shame" | The Spinners | June 1970 | 14 | 20 | 14 (United States) | 4 (US Billboard Hot Soul Singles) - 15 (US Cash Box Top 100) - 36 (Canada) |
| "It's Impossible" | Perry Como | September 1970 | 10 | 4 | 4 (United Kingdom) | See Chart Performance Entry |
| "It's Only Make Believe" | Glen Campbell | August 1970 | 10 | 4 | 1 (Australia) | See Chart Performance Entry |
| "I've Lost You" | Elvis Presley | July 1970 | 32 | 9 | 6 (Australia) | See Chart Performance Entry |
| "5-10-15-20 (25-30 Years of Love)" | The Presidents | September 1970 | 11 | n/a | 11 (United States) | 5 (US Billboard R&B) - 7 (US Cash Box Top 100) - 43 (Canada) |
| "Jingle Jangle" | The Archies | Released in 1969; Charted in '69/'70 | 10 | n/a | 1 (Canada) | 10 (New Zealand) - 15 (South Africa) - 37 (US Billboard Easy Listening) |
| "Joanne" | Michael Nesmith & The First National Band | July 1970 | 21 | n/a | 3 (Australia) | 4 (Canada) - 6 (US Billboard Adult Contemporary) - 13 (US Records World) - 17 (US Cashbox Top 100) |
| "Julie, Do Ya Love Me" | Bobby Sherman | July 1970 | 5 | 28 | 3 (Canada) | 2 (Canada - CHUM 30, US Billboard Easy Listening) - 3 (Australia- Go-Set, US Cash Box Top 100) |
| "Kentucky Rain" | Elvis Presley | January 1970 | 16 | 21 | 7 (Australia) | See Chart Performance Entry |
| "Knock Knock, Who's There?" | Mary Hopkin | March 1970 | 92 | n/a | 1 (New Zealand) | See Chart Performance Entry |
| "Knock Three Times" | Tony Orlando and Dawn | November 1970 | 1 | n/a | 1 (6 countries) | See Chart Performance Entry |
| "Lady D'Arbanville" | Cat Stevens | April 1970 | n/a | 8 | 2 (Netherlands) | 11 (Spain) - 16 (New Zealand) - 20 (Australia) - 23 (Germany) |
| "Lay Down (Candles in the Rain)" | Melanie with The Edwin Hawkins Singers | March 1970 | 6 | n/a | 1 (Canada, Netherlands) | See Chart Performance Entry |
| "The Letter" | Joe Cocker with Leon Russell | March 1970 | 7 | 39 | 7 (Canada, US) | 27 (Australia) |
| "Little Green Bag" | George Baker Selection | Released in 1969; Chartred in '69/'71 | 21 | n/a | 3 (Belgium) | See Chart Performance Entry |
| "Lola" | The Kinks | June 1970 | 9 | 2 | 1 (4 countries) | See Chart Performance Entry |
| "Lonely Days" | Bee Gees | November 1970 | 3 | 33 | 1 (Canada) | See Chart Performance Entry |
| "Look What They've Done to My Song Ma" | The New Seekers | October 1970 | 14 | 44 | 1 (New Zealand) | See Chart Performance Entry |
| "Love Grows (Where My Rosemary Goes)" | Edison Lighthouse | January 1970 | 5 | 1 | 1 (Ireland, New Zealand, UK) | See Chart Performance Entry |
| "Love the One You're With" | Stephen Stills | November 1970 | 14 | 37 | 6 (Canada) | See Chart Performance Entry |
| "Love or Let Me Be Lonely" | The Friends of Distinction | March 1970 | 6 | n/a | 2 (Canada) | 8 (US Cash Box Top 100) - 8 (US Billboard Adult Contemporary) - 13 (US Billboard R&B Singles) - 55 (Australia) |
| "Ma Belle Amie" | Tee-Set | Released in 1969; Charted in '69/'70 | 5 | n/a | 1 (South Africa) | See Chart Performance Entry |
| "Make It Easy on Yourself" | Dionne Warwick | September 1970 | 37 | n/a | 2 (Australia) | 24 (Canada) - 26 (US Billboard Hot Adult Contemporary) - 26 (US Billboard Hot Soul Singles) |
| "Make It with You" | Bread | April 1970 | 1 | 5 | 1 (United States) | 1 (US Cashbox Top 100) - 2 (Canada) - 4 (US Billboard Easy Listening) - 6 (New Zealand) - 7 (Australia) - 10 (Ireland) |
| "Make Me Smile" | Chicago | March 1970 | 9 | n/a | 9 (United Kingdom) | 11 (Canada) - 11 (US Cash Box Top 100) - 24 (France) - 33 (Australia) |
| "Me And My Life" | The Tremeloes | August 1970 | n/a | 4 | 2 (Ireland) | See Chart Performance Entry |
| "Montego Bay" | Bobby Bloom | September 1970 | 8 | 3 | 1 (Singapore) | See Chart Performance Entry |
| "Mr. Bojangles" | Nitty Gritty Dirt Band | September 1970 | 9 | n/a | 2 (Canada, New Zealand) | 9 (US Cash Box Top 100) - 10 (US Billboard Adult Contemporary) - 15 (Australia) - 28 (Netherlands) |
| "My Baby Loves Lovin'" | White Plains | January 1970 | 13 | 9 | 4 (Canada) | See Chart Performance Entry |
| Natural Sinner | Fair Weather | July 1970 | n/a | 6 | 6 (United Kingdom) | 10 (Ireland) - 14 (Belgium) - 21 (Netherlands) - 24 (Germany) - 26 (Netherlands Dutch Top 40) - 49 (Belgium) |
| "Neanderthal Man" | Hotlegs | June 1970 | 22 | 2 | 2 (South Africa, UK) | 3 (Switzerland) - 4 (West Germany) - 7 (Austria) - 10 (Belgium) - 13 (Canada) - 23 (Netherlands) |
| "Never Had a Dream Come True" | Stevie Wonder | February 1970 | 31 | 6 | 6 (UK) | 11 (US Billboard Best Selling Soul Singles) - 31 (US Billboard Easy Listening) |
| "New World in the Morning" | Roger Whittaker | October 1970 | n/a | 17 | 1 (Ireland) | 12 (US Billboard Hot Adult Contemporary Tracks) - 17 (New Zealand) - 24 (Netherlands) - 85 (Australia) |
| "No Matter What" | Badfinger | October 1970 | 8 | 5 | 1 (South Africa) | See Chart Performance Entry |
| "No Sugar Tonight" | The Guess Who | Released in 1969; Charted in 1970 | 5 | 19 | 1 (Canada) | 4 (US Cashbox Top 100) - 16 (New Zealand) - 43 (Australia) |
| "No Time" | The Guess Who | Released in 1969; Charted in 1970 | 5 | 19 | 1 (Canada) | 4 (US Cash Box Top 100) - 16 (New Zealand) - 43 (Australia) |
| "Ohio" | Crosby, Stills, Nash & Young | June 1970 | 14 | n/a | 13 (Netherlands) | 13 (US Record World Top 100) - 14 (US Cash Box Top 100) - 16 (Canada) - 44 (Australia) |
| "Ooh Child" | The Five Stairsteps | April 1970 | 8 | n/a | 3 (Canada) | 4 (US Cash Box Top 100) - 14 (US Billboard R&B Singles) |
| "Our House" | Crosby, Stills, Nash & Young | September 1970 | 30 | n/a | 9 (Netherlands) | See Chart Performance Entry |
| "Out in the Country" | Three Dog Night | August 1970 | 15 | n/a | 9 (Canada) | 9 (US Cash Box Top 100) - 11 (US Billboard Adult Contemporary) - 85 (Australia) |
| "Paranoid" | Black Sabbath | August 1970 | 61 | 4 | 1 (Denmark, West Germany) | See Chart Performance Entry |
| "Patches" | Clarence Carter | July 1970 | 4 | 2 | 2 (United Kingdom) | 1 (US Cash Box Top 100) - 2 (US Billboard R&B) - 4 (Ireland) - 10 (Australia) - 16 (Canada) |
| "Question" | The Moody Blues | April 1970 | 21 | 2 | 1 (Ireland, Netherlands) | See Chart Performance Entry |
| "The Rapper" | The Jaggerz | January 1970 | 2 | n/a | 2 (United States) | 1 (US Record World Singles) - 2 (US Cash Box Top 100) - 3 (Canada) - 32 (Australia) |
| "Reach Out and Touch (Somebody's Hand)" | Diana Ross | April 1970 | 20 | 33 | 20 (United States) | 7 (US Billboard Best Selling Soul Singles) - 10 (US Cash Box Top 100) - 13 (Netherlands [Dutch Top 40]) - 18 (US Billboard Adult Contemporary) - 23 (Canada) |
| "Reflections of My Life" | Marmalade | Released in 1969; Charted in '69/'70 | 10 | 3 | 2 (Ireland) | See Chart Performance Entry |
| "Remember Me" | Diana Ross | December 1970 | 16 | 7 | 7 (United Kingdom) | 8 (US Cash Box Top 100) - 9 (Canada) - 10 (US Billboard R&B/Soul) - 20 (US Billboard Adult Contemporary) |
| "Ride Captain Ride" | Blues Image | May 1970 | 4 | n/a | 4 (Canada, United States) | 5 (US Cash Box Top 100) - 23 (Australia) |
| "Ruby Tuesday" | Melanie | December 1970 | 52 | 9 | 7 (New Zealand) | 10 (South Africa) - 12 (Ireland) - 25 (Canada) - 34 (US Cash Box Top 100) - 70 (Australia) |
| "Share the Land" | The Guess Who | September 1970 | 10 | n/a | 2 (Canada) | 2 (Canada) - 63 (Australia) |
| "Silver Bird" | Mark Lindsay | May 1970 | 25 | n/a | 10 (Canada) | 7 (U.S. Billboard Adult Contemporary) - 15 (New Zealand) - 20 (U.S. Cash Box Top 100) - 33 (Australia) |
| "Snowbird" | Anne Murray | June 1970 | 8 | 23 | 3 (New Zealand) | See Chart Performance Entry |
| "Something" | Shirley Bassey | June 1970 | 55 | 4 | 4 (United Kingdom) | See Chart Performance Entry |
| "Spill the Wine" | Eric Burdon & War | May 1970 | 3 | n/a | 2 (Australia) | See Chart Performance Entry |
| "Stoned Love" | The Supremes | October 1970 | 7 | 3 | 3 (United Kingdom) | See Chart Performance Entry |

=== Other Chart hit singles ===
- "All I Have to Do Is Dream" - Bobbie Gentry & Glen Campbell (# 66 US, # 30 U.S. Billboard Easy Listening Chart, # 79 U.S. Billboard Hot Country Singles Chart)
- "All Kinds of Everything" – Dana (Won the Eurovision song contest)
- "Baby Hold On" – The Grass Roots
- "Beaucoups of Blues" – Ringo Starr (# 35 CAN, # 43 GERM, # 66 AUS, # 87 US)
- "The Bells" – The Originals
- "Betty" – The Commodores (Not from Tuskegee, but a white quintet from Chatsworth, California)
- "(Blame It) On The Pony Express" – Johnny Johnson and the Bandwagon
- "Blowing Away" – The 5th Dimension
- "Border Song (Holy Moses)" – Aretha Franklin
- "Born to Wander" – Rare Earth
- "The Boxer" – Simon & Garfunkel
- "Brontosaurus" – The Move # 7 (UK), # 36 (Canada)
- "Brother Rapp (Parts 1 & 2)" – James Brown
- "Call Me" – Aretha Franklin
- "Can't Help Falling in Love" – Andy Williams
- "Celebrate" – Three Dog Night (# 8 CAN, # 15 US)
- "Check Out Your Mind" – The Impressions
- "Chestnut Mare" – The Byrds (# 19 UK)
- "I'm Your Captain (Closer to Home)" – Grand Funk Railroad
- "Come Running" – Van Morrison
- "Come Saturday Morning" – The Sandpipers
- "Cupid" – Johnny Nash (# 19 IRE, # 30 CAN, # 39 US)
- "Daughter of Darkness" – Tom Jones
- "Deeper and Deeper" – Freda Payne
- "Didn't I (Blow Your Mind This Time)" – The Delfonics
- "Do It" – Neil Diamond
- "Do the Funky Chicken" – Rufus Thomas
- "Do What You Wanna Do" – Five Flights Up
- "Do You See My Love (for You Growing)" – Jr. Walker & the All-Stars
- "Don't Play That Song (You Lied)" – Aretha Franklin
- "Engine Number 9" – Wilson Pickett
- "Everybody's Got the Right to Love" – The Supremes
- "Everybody's Out of Town" – B. J. Thomas
- "Everything's Tuesday" – Chairmen of the Board
- "Evil Ways" – Santana
- "Express Yourself" – Charles Wright & the Watts 103rd Street Rhythm Band
- "Farewell is a Lonely Sound" – Jimmy Ruffin
- "For the Love of Him" – Bobbi Martin
- "Friends" – Arrival
- "Everybody Get Together" - The Dave Clark Five (# 8 UK)
- "The Girls' Song" – The 5th Dimension
- "God, Love and Rock & Roll" – Teegarden & Van Winkle
- "Goodbye Sam, Hello Samantha" – Cliff Richard
- "Gotta Hold on to This Feeling" – Jr. Walker & the All Stars
- "Govinda" – Radha Krishna Temple
- "Groovin' with Mr. Bloe" – Mr. Bloe
- "Groovy Situation" – Gene Chandler
- "Gypsy Woman" – Brian Hyland
- "Hand Me Down World" – The Guess Who
- "Heed the Call" – Kenny Rogers & the First Edition
- "Hey Lawdy Mama" – Steppenwolf
- "Hey There Lonely Girl" – Eddie Holman # 2 (US)
- "Hi-De-Ho" – Blood, Sweat & Tears
- "Home Lovin' Man" – Andy Williams (# 7 )(UK)
- "I Ain't Got Time Anymore" – Cliff Richard
- "I Am Somebody (Part 2)" – Johnnie Taylor
- "I Can't Tell The Bottom From The Top" – The Hollies
- "I Don't Believe In If Anymore" – Roger Whittaker
- "(I Know) I'm Losing You" – Rare Earth
- "I Really Don't Want to Know" – Elvis Presley
- "I Will Survive" – Arrival
- "If I Were Your Woman" – Gladys Knight & the Pips
- "(If You Let Me Make Love to You Then) Why Can't I Touch You?" – Ronnie Dyson
- "I'll Never Fall in Love Again" – Dionne Warwick
- "I'll Say Forever My Love" – Jimmy Ruffin
- "I'm A Man" – Chicago # 8 (UK) - # 13 (Ireland) - # 49 (United States)
- "I'm Not My Brother's Keeper" – The Flaming Ember
- "It's a New Day (Parts 1 & 2)" – James Brown
- "It's All in the Game" – Four Tops
- "It's So Easy" – Andy Williams (# 13 UK, # 19 IRE)
- "Jam Up and Jelly Tight" - Tommy Roe # 5 (Australia, Canada) - # 8 (United States)
- "Jennifer Tomkins" – Street People
- "Joy of Living" – Cliff & Hank
- "Lady Barbara" – Herman's Hermits
- "Lay a Little Lovin' on Me" – Robin McNamara
- "Let A Man Come in and Do the Popcorn (Part 2)" – James Brown
- "Let's Work Together" – Canned Heat
- "Long Lonesome Highway" – Michael Parks
- "Long, Long Time" – Linda Ronstadt
- "Love Land" – Charles Wright & the Watts 103rd Street Rhythm Band
- "Love of the Common People" – Nicky Thomas
- "Love on a Two-Way Street" – The Moments
- "Lucretia MacEvil" – Blood, Sweat & Tears
- "Midnight Cowboy" – Ferrante & Teicher
- "Mississippi Queen" – Mountain # 21 (US)
- "Mongoose" – Elephant's Memory
- "Most of All" – B. J. Thomas
- "New World Coming" – Mama Cass
- "One Day of Your Life" – Andy Williams
- "Only Love Can Break Your Heart" – Neil Young
- "On the Beach (In the Summertime)" – The 5th Dimension
- "Overture from Tommy (A Rock Opera)" – The Assembled Multitude
- "Psychedelic Shack" – The Temptations
- "Puppet Man" – The 5th Dimension
- "Rainbow" – Marmalade
- "Raindrops Keep Fallin' On My Head" – Bobbie Gentry
- "Raindrops Keep Fallin' On My Head" – Sacha Distel (dubbed)
- "Rainy Night In Georgia" – Brook Benton
- "Rubber Duckie" – Ernie (Jim Henson)
- "Save the Country" – The 5th Dimension
- "See Me, Feel Me" – The Who
- "She Came in Through the Bathroom Window" – Joe Cocker
- "Shilo" – Neil Diamond
- "Sly, Slick & The Wicked" – The Lost Generation
- "Solitary Man" – Neil Diamond
- "Somebody's Been Sleeping" – 100 Proof (Aged in Soul)
- "Something's Burning" – Kenny Rogers & the First Edition
- "Son of a Preacher Man" – Aretha Franklin
- "A Song of Joy (Himno A La Alegria)" – Miguel Rios
- "Soolaimon (African Trilogy II)" – Neil Diamond
- "Spirit in the Dark" – Aretha Franklin
- "Stand By Your Man" – Candi Staton
- "Steal Away" – Johnnie Taylor
- "Still Water (Love)" – Four Tops
- "Stoney End" – Barbra Streisand
- "Stop the War Now" – Edwin Starr
- "Sugar, Sugar" – Wilson Pickett
- "Summertime Blues" – The Who
- "Super Bad (Parts 1 & 2)" – James Brown
- "Sweet Gingerbread Man" – Mike Curb Congregation
- "Sweet Inspiration" – Johnny Johnson and the Bandwagon
- "Teach Your Children" – Crosby, Stills, Nash & Young
- "Tell It All Brother" – Kenny Rogers & the First Edition
- "Temma Harbour" – Mary Hopkin
- "Temptation Eyes" – The Grass Roots
- "Tennessee Bird Walk" – Jack Blanchard & Misty Morgan
- "That's Where I Went Wrong" – Poppy Family
- "The Thrill Is Gone" – B. B. King
- "Ticket to Ride" – The Carpenters
- "Tighter, Tighter" – Alive N Kickin'
- "Tobacco Road" – Eric Burdon & War
- "Tracy" – The Cuff Links
- "Travelin' Band" – Creedence Clearwater Revival
- "Turn Back the Hands of Time" – Tyrone Davis
- "25 or 6 to 4" – Chicago
- "Ugena Za Ulimwengu (Unite the World)" – The Temptations
- "United We Stand" – Brotherhood of Man
- "Up Around the Bend" – Creedence Clearwater Revival
- "Up on Cripple Creek" – The Band
- "Up the Ladder to the Roof" – The Supremes
- "Vehicle" – The Ides of March
- "Viva Tirado (Part 1)" – El Chicano
- "Voodoo Chile" – The Jimi Hendrix Experience
- "Walk a Mile in My Shoes" – Joe South
- "Wand'rin' Star" – Lee Marvin
- "We Gotta Get You a Woman" – Runt (Todd Rundgren)
- "Westbound #9" – The Flaming Ember
- "What Is Truth" – Johnny Cash
- "When I'm Dead And Gone" – McGuinness Flint
- "Which Way You Goin' Billy?" – Poppy Family
- "Whole Lotta Love" – C.C.S.
- "Who'll Stop the Rain" – Creedence Clearwater Revival
- "Who's Your Baby" – The Archies
- "Wild World" – Cat Stevens
- "The Witch" – The Rattles
- "The Witch's Promise"/"Teacher" – Jethro Tull
- "Without Love" – Tom Jones
- "The Wonder of You"/"Mama Liked the Roses" – Elvis Presley
- "Wonderful World, Beautiful People" – Jimmy Cliff
- "Woodstock" – Crosby, Stills, Nash & Young
- "Woodstock" – Matthews Southern Comfort
- "Years May Come, Years May Go" – Herman's Hermits
- "Yellow River" – Christie
- "You Can Get It If You Really Want" – Desmond Dekker
- "You Don't Have to Say You Love Me" – Elvis Presley
- "You Need Love Like I Do (Don't You)" – Gladys Knight & the Pips
- "(You've Got Me) Dangling on a String" – Chairmen of the Board
- "Young, Gifted and Black" – Bob and Marcia

== Published popular songs ==
- "An American Trilogy" medley written & arranged by Mickey Newbury
- "Bein' Green" w.m. Joe Raposo, from the TV series Sesame Street
- "Have You Ever Seen the Rain?" w.m. John C. Fogerty
- "I Love youuuuuu" w.m. Jeff Moss, from the TV series Sesame Street
- "If Not For You" w.m. Bob Dylan
- "Kentucky Rain" w.m. Eddie Rabbitt & Dick Heard
- "The Ladies Who Lunch" w.m. Stephen Sondheim. Introduced by Elaine Stritch in the musical Company.
- "Lookin' out My Back Door" w.m. John C. Fogerty
- "People in Your Neighborhood" w.m. Jeff Moss, from the TV series Sesame Street
- "Rubber Duckie" w.m. Jeff Moss, from the TV series Sesame Street
- "Teach Your Children" w.m. Graham Nash
- "(They Long to Be) Close to You" w. Hal David m. Burt Bacharach
- "Who'll Stop the Rain" w.m. John C. Fogerty
- "Where Do I Begin" (Love Story) – w. Carl Sigman, m. Francis Lai

== Classical music ==
- Sir Arthur Bliss – Concerto for Cello and Orchestra
- Pierre Boulez - Cummings ist der Dichter
- George Crumb
  - Ancient Voices of Children for mezzo-soprano, boy soprano, oboe, mandolin, harp, amplified piano (and toy piano), and percussion (three players)
  - Black Angels (Images I) for electric string quartet
- Mario Davidovsky – Synchronisms No. 6 for piano and electronic sound
- Charles Dodge – Earth's Magnetic Field
- Henri Dutilleux – Figures de résonances for two pianos
- Morton Feldman
  - Madame Press Died Last Week at Ninety
  - The Viola in My Life 1, 2 and 3
- Luc Ferrari – Presque rien No. 1 "Le Lever du jour au bord de la mer"
- Miloslav Kabeláč – Symphony No. 8 "Antiphonies"
- György Ligeti – Continuum
- Witold Lutosławski – Concerto for Cello and Orchestra
- Olivier Messiaen – La Fauvette des Jardins
- Allan Pettersson – Symphony No. 9
- Poul Ruders – Piano Sonata No. 1
- Karlheinz Stockhausen
  - Expo for three players with short-wave radios, and sound projectionist
  - Mantra for two pianos and live electronics
  - Pole for two players with short-wave radios, and sound projectionist
- John Tavener – The Whale (recording)

== Opera ==
- Herman D. Koppel – Macbeth

== Musical theater ==
- 1776, London production
- Applause (book: Betty Comden & Adolph Green, lyrics: Lee Adams, music: Charles Strouse) – Broadway production opened at the Palace Theater and ran for 896 performances
- The Boy Friend (Sandy Wilson) – Broadway revival
- Cabaret (Kander and Ebb) – Vienna production
- Company (Stephen Sondheim) – Broadway production opened at the Alvin Theater and ran for 705 performances
- Dames at Sea, Broadway revival
- Georgy, Broadway production opened at the Winter Garden Theater and ran for four performances
- Golden Bat Off-Broadway production opened at the Sheridan Square Playhouse on July 21 and ran for 152 performances
- The Great Waltz, London production
- Look to the Lilies (Jule Styne and Sammy Cahn) – Broadway production opened at the Lunt-Fontanne Theatre and ran for 25 performances
- The Me Nobody Knows, started as an off-Broadway production, then moved to Broadway, where it ran for 378 performances
- Minnie's Boys, Broadway production opened at the Imperial Theatre and ran for 80 performances
- Purlie, Broadway production opened at The Broadway Theatre and ran for 688 performances
- The Rothschilds (book: Sherman Yellen, lyrics: Sheldon Harnick, music: Jerry Bock), Broadway production opened at the Lunt-Fontanne Theatre on October 19 and ran for 507 performances. Starring Hal Linden, Jill Clayburgh and Paul Hecht.
- Two by Two, Broadway production opened at the Imperial Theatre and ran for 351 performances

== Musical films ==
- The Aristocats, animated feature film with the voices of Phil Harris, Eva Gabor, Thurl Ravenscroft, Hermione Baddeley and Sterling Holloway
- Darling Lili, starring Julie Andrews, Rock Hudson, Lance Percival and Jeremy Kemp
- Dastak, Hindi film starring Sanjeev Kumar
- Johny Mera Naam, Hindi film starring Dev Anand and Pran
- Let It Be, a documentary film featuring The Beatles
- On a Clear Day You Can See Forever starring Barbra Streisand, Yves Montand and Bob Newhart
- Peau d'Âne, starring Catherine Deneuve and Jean Marais, with music by Michel Legrand
- Scrooge, starring Albert Finney, Alec Guinness, Kenneth More, Suzanne Neve and Anton Rodgers
- Song of Norway, starring Toralv Maurstad, Florence Henderson and Harry Secombe.
- Woodstock, a documentary film featuring Jimi Hendrix, The Who, Jefferson Airplane, Canned Heat and others

== Births ==
- January – Frank Mullen, American rock singer (Suffocation)
- January 2
  - Eric Whitacre, composer
  - Karen Kamensek, orchestra conductor
- January 5 – Jeffrey Jey, Italian musician and singer-songwriter (Eiffel 65)
- January 9
  - Carl Bell, American singer-songwriter, guitarist, and producer
  - Lara Fabian, Canadian-Belgian singer
  - Mia X, rapper
  - Alex Staropoli, Italian keyboard player and songwriter
  - Yang Hyun-suk, South Korean rapper (Seo Taiji and Boys)
- January 12
  - Raekwon, American rapper (Wu-Tang Clan)
  - Zack de la Rocha (Rage Against the Machine)
- January 18 – DJ Quik, rapper and record producer
- January 20 – Edwin McCain, American singer-songwriter and guitarist
- January 23 – Brendan O'Connor, Irish singer and television host
- January 26 – Kirk Franklin, American songwriter, choir director, gospel singer and rapper
- January 27 – Mark Trojanowski (Sister Hazel)
- January 31
  - Minnie Driver, English singer-songwriter and actress
  - Danny Michel, Canadian singer-songwriter and producer
- February 3 – WC, American rapper and actor
- February 12 – Jim Creeggan (Barenaked Ladies)
- February 13 – Karoline Krüger, Swedish singer and composer
- February 16 – Armand van Helden, American DJ, songwriter, remixer and record producer
- February 18
  - Susan Egan, American actress and singer
  - Raine Maida, Canadian musician and beat poet (Our Lady Peace)
  - Jez Williams, English guitarist (Doves)
  - Andy Williams, English drummer (Doves)
- February 19 – Lord Finesse, American rapper and hip-hop
- February 20 – Son Ji-chang, South Korean singer (The Blue)
- February 26 – Linda Brava, Finnish violinist
- February 28 – Daniel Handler, accordionist and arranger (The Magnetic Fields)
- March 1 – Jason V Brock, American author, filmmaker, artist, scholar and musician
- March 5 – John Frusciante, American guitarist, singer, producer and composer (Red Hot Chili Peppers)
- March 7 – Vladislav Adelkhanov, Georgian classical violinist and writer
- March 8 - Van Hunt, American singer-songwriter, multi-instrumentalist, and record producer
- March 9
  - La India, salsa singer
  - Shannon Leto, American drummer and songwriter (Thirty Seconds to Mars)
- March 12 – Roy Khan, Norwegian singer-songwriter
- March 16
  - Britt Walford, American musician (Slint)
  - Alex Lee, English musician (Suede)
  - Paul Oscar, Icelandic pop singer, songwriter and disc jockey
- March 17 – Gene Ween, guitarist and vocalist (Ween)
- March 18 – Queen Latifah, American rapper, singer and actress
- March 21 – Jaya, Filipino singer and television personality
- March 24
  - Sharon Corr, Irish musician
  - Vincent Mason, American rapper, producer and DJ (De La Soul)
- March 25
  - Teri Moïse, American singer
  - Oh Hyun-kyung, South Korean actress
- March 27 – Brendan Hill, drummer (Blues Traveler)
- April 4 – Sean Kelly, Canadian guitarist
- April 5 – Miho Hatori, Japanese singer and songwriter (Cibo Matto)
- April 6 – Joe Gittleman, guitarist (The Mighty Mighty Bosstones)
- April 10
  - Mike Mushok, guitarist (Staind)
  - Q-Tip, rapper, record producer, singer, and DJ (A Tribe Called Quest)
- April 11
  - Delroy Pearson, British singer (Five Star)
  - Whigfield, Danish model, singer, songwriter and record producer
  - Remi Kabaka Jr., English record producer (Gorillaz)
- April 12 – Nick Hexum, American singer and guitarist
- April 13
  - Eduardo Capetillo, Mexican actor and singer
  - Seagram, American rapper (d. 1996)
- April 14 – Shizuka Kudo, Japanese singer and actress
- April 17 – Redman, rapper
- April 18
  - Greg Eklund, American rock drummer (Everclear)
  - Tess Merkel, Swedish singer (Alcazar)
- April 19 – Luis Miguel, Mexican singer
- April 20 – Sarantuya, Mongolian soprano
- April 22 – Regine Velasquez, Filipino singer, actress, model and record producer
- April 26 – Tionne "T-Boz" Watkins, singer and songwriter (TLC)
- April 29 – Master P, American rapper
- May 1
  - Bernard Butler, English musician (Suede, The Tears)
  - Sacha Perry, American jazz pianist and composer
- May 4 – Gregg Alexander, American singer, songwriter and producer (New Radicals)
- May 5 – Driss El Maloumi, Moroccan oud player and composer
- May 8 – Felix Buxton, (Basement Jaxx)
- May 9 – Ghostface Killah, American rapper (Wu-Tang Clan)
- May 10
  - Perry Blake, Irish singer-songwriter
  - Craig Mack, American rapper (d. 2018)
- May 15 – Attrell Cordes (P.M. Dawn)
- May 17
  - Jordan Knight, American singer (New Kids on the Block)
  - Angelica Agurbash, Belarusian singer and model
- May 18 – Billy Howerdel, guitarist, songwriter and producer (A Perfect Circle)
- May 19 – Merethe Trøan, Norwegian singer
- May 23 – Matt Flynn, American musician (Maroon 5)
- May 28 – Jimi Goodwin, British musician (Doves)
- June 2 – B-Real, rapper (Cypress Hill)
- June 3
  - Peter Tägtgren, Swedish musician (Hypocrisy)
  - Esther Hart, Dutch singer
- June 4 – Kelly Moneymaker, American singer, songwriter, producer and director (Exposé)
- June 5 – Claus Norreen, Danish musician (Aqua)
- June 6 – James Shaffer, musician
- June 7 – Kenny Dope, American record producer and disc jockey (Masters at Work)
- June 8 – Seu Jorge, Brazilian pop samba singer=songwriter
- June 10 – Mike Doughty, American singer
- June 11 – MF Grimm, American rapper
- June 13
  - Cheryl "Coko" Clemons, American singer
  - Rivers Cuomo, American singer, guitarist and songwriter (Weezer)
- June 14 – Ray Luzier, American drummer (Korn)
- June 15 – Leah Remini, American actress
- June 17 – Sasha Sokol, Mexican singer
- June 19
  - MJ Hibbett, English singer-songwriter
  - Brian Welch, American singer-songwriter and guitarist (Korn and Love and Death)
  - D-Nice, American DJ, record producer and rapper (Boogie Down Productions)
- June 20
  - Jason Robert Brown, American playwright and composer
  - Pandora, Swedish singer and songwriter
- June 21
  - Eric Reed, American pianist and composer (Black Note)
  - Pete Rock, American rapper and producer (Pete Rock & CL Smooth)
- June 22 – Steven Page, Canadian singer and songwriter (Barenaked Ladies)
- June 23
  - Christian Meier, Peruvian actor and singer
  - Yann Tiersen, Breton musician
  - Britt Synnøve Johansen, Norwegian singer
- June 24
  - Glenn Medeiros, American singer
  - Andres Raag, Estonian actor and singer
  - Alexandros Panayi, Greek-Cypriot singer
- June 25 – Roope Latvala, Finnish guitarist
- July 1 – Tajči, Croatian singer
- July 2 – Monie Love, English rapper and actress
- July 4
  - Christian Giesler, American bass player (Kreator)
  - Coo Coo Cal, American rapper
- July 6
  - Harald Nævdal (Demonaz Doom Occulta), Norwegian musician
  - Inspectah Deck, American rapper and hip-hop producer (Wu-Tang Clan)
- July 8 – Beck, American singer, songwriter, rapper, record producer, and multi-instrumentalist
- July 10
  - Gary LeVox, American singer
  - Jason Orange, British singer (Take That)
- July 12 – Juba Kalamka, American rapper (Deep Dickollective)
- July 14 – Thomas Lauderdale, American pianist (Pink Martini)
- July 15 – Chi Cheng (musician), American rock bassist
- July 17 – Mandy Smith, English model and singer
- July 18 – Gruff Rhys, Welsh musician, composer, producer, filmmaker and author
- July 19 – Sandee Chan, Taiwanese singer
- July 25 – Brian Blade, American drummer and composer
- July 26 – Joan As Police Woman (Joan Wasser), American singer-songwriter
- August 3
  - Itamar Golan, Israeli pianist
  - Gina G, English singer
  - DJ Spinderella, American DJ, rapper and producer (Salt-N-Pepa)
- August 7 – Kim Hill, singer
- August 11
  - Ali Shaheed Muhammad, American hip hop DJ, record producer, rapper and bass guitarist (A Tribe Called Quest)
  - Andy Bell, British bassist, guitarist, singer-songwriter, and producer
- August 19 – Joseph Cartagena (Fat Joe), American rapper
- August 20 – Fred Durst, American rapper, singer, songwriter, actor and director (Limp Bizkit)
- August 23
  - Brad Mehldau, American pianist and composer
  - River Phoenix, American actor and singer of Aleka's Attic (d. 1993)
- August 24 – Kristyn Robyn Osborn, American country singer (SHeDAISY)
- August 27
  - Park Myung-soo, South Korean singer
  - Tony Kanal, American musician (No Doubt)
- August 28 – Sherrié Austin, Australian actress and singer
- August 30 – Guang Liang, Malaysian singer
- August 31
  - Debbie Gibson, American singer-songwriter
  - Epic Mazur, American vocalist, rapper, and record producer
- September 1 – Vanna, Croatian pop singer
- September 4 – Daisy Dee, Dutch singer
- September 5 – Liam Lynch, songwriter and music video director
- September 6
  - Cheyne Coates, Australian EDM-pop singer-songwriter and producer (Madison Avenue)
  - Kim English, American electronica, soul, gospel, and house music singer (d. 2019)
  - Dean Fertita, American multi-instrumentalist (Queens of the Stone Age, The Dead Weather)
  - DJ Spooky, American turntablist and producer
- September 7
  - Chad Sexton, drummer (311)
  - Brad Houser, American bassist (Edie Brickell & New Bohemians)
- September 8
  - Benny Ibarra, Mexican singer
  - Neko Case, American singer-songwriter (K D LANG, case/lang/veirs, The New Pornographers)
- September 10
  - Jeff Marx, American Broadway composer
  - Ménélik, French rapper
- September 14 – Craig Montoya, bassist (Everclear)
- September 14 – Mark Webber, English guitarist (Pulp)
- September 15 – Jukka Jokikokko, Finnish musician and studio engineer
- September 19 – Takanori Nishikawa, singer and actor (T.M. Revolution)
- September 20
  - Robbie Chater, Australian DJ (The Avalanches)
  - Dominika Peczynski, Polish-Swedish singer (Army of Lovers)
- September 23 – Ani DiFranco, American singer, multi-instrumentalist, poet, songwriter, feminist icon and businesswoman
- September 25 – Dean Ween, American singer/songwriter (Ween)
- October 3 – Jimmy Ray, English singer, songwriter and musician
- October 5
  - South Park Mexican, Chicano rapper
  - Slimkid3, American rapper (The Pharcyde)
- October 6 – Amy Jo Johnson, American actress and singer
- October 7 – Neil Halstead, English musician, singer, lyricist and guitarist of Slowdive
- October 9 – Jennifer Aspen, American actress
- October 13 – Paul Potts, British tenor
- October 14 – Maxine, Dutch singer
- October 15
  - Eric Benét, American singer
  - Ginuwine, American singer, songwriter, dancer and actor.
- October 21 – Tony Mortimer, British singer (East 17)
- October 24
  - Jarkko Martikainen, Finnish rock musician
  - Jeff Mangum, American singer, songwriter, and musician (Neutral Milk Hotel)
- October 25 – Ed Robertson (Barenaked Ladies)
- October 27 – Adrian Erlandsson, Swedish drummer
- October 28 – Kurt Rosenwinkel, American guitarist, composer and keyboardist
- October 29 – Toby Smith, English keyboardist (Jamiroquai) (d. 2017)
- October 30 - Tommy Walter, American bassist (Eels, Abandoned Pools)
- October 31 – Linn Berggren, Swedish musician (Ace of Base)
- November 1 – Sherwin Campbell, Barbadian cricketer
- November 2 – Ely Buendia, Filipino rock lead singer and rhythm guitarist (The Eraserheads)
- November 4 – Efrim Menuck, Canadian musician (Godspeed You! Black Emperor)
- November 7 – Neil Hannon, Northern Irish musician (The Divine Comedy)
- November 8 – Diana King, Jamaican singer-songwriter
- November 9
  - Susan Tedeschi, American musician and singer
  - Scarface, American rapper (Geto Boys)
  - Tracy Young, American DJ, record producer and remixer
- November 10
  - U-God, American rapper (Wu-Tang Clan)
  - Warren G, American rapper, DJ and producer
- November 11 – Elina Konstantopoulou, Greek singer
- November 12 – Sarah Harmer, Canadian singer-songwriter and guitarist
- November 15 – Jack Ingram, American singer-songwriter and guitarist
- November 20 – Phife Dawg, American rapper (A Tribe Called Quest) (d. 2016)
- November 24
  - Julieta Venegas, Mexican singer, songwriter, instrumentalist and producer
  - Chad Taylor, American guitarist (Live).
- November 28
  - Richard Osman, English television presenter, producer and novelist
  - Matt Cheslin, English bassist (Ned's Atomic Dustbin)
- December 1 – Jonathan Coulton, American folk rock singer-songwriter
- December 2
  - Sergei Krylov, violinist
  - Treach, American rapper (Naughty by Nature)
- December 5 - Michel'le, African-American singer
- December 6
  - Christian Savill, English musician (Slowdive)
  - Ulf Ekberg, Swedish musician (Ace of Base)
- December 9 – Kara DioGuardi, American singer-songwriter, producer, television judge, musician, record producer, music publisher, A&R executive, composer and TV personality
- December 14
  - Beth Orton, British singer-songwriter
  - Anna Maria Jopek, Polish singer, songwriter and musician
- December 18
  - DMX, American rapper (d. 2021)
  - Cowboy Troy, American singer and rapper
  - Yannis Ploutarchos, Greek singer and songwriter
- December 19 – Stacy Jones, American musician, songwriter and producer (Veruca Salt)
- December 24
  - Will Oldham, American musician
  - Young Zee, American rapper, songwriter and producer (Outsidaz)
- December 26 – Dave Westlake, English musician and drummer (Sneaker Pimps)
- December 29
  - Aled Jones, Welsh boy soprano, later baritone
  - Glen Phillips, American singer/songwriter (Toad the Wet Sprocket)
- December 30 – Traa Daniels, American guitarist (P.O.D.)
- date unknown – Ralph Farris, American violist, violinist, composer, arranger, producer and conductor (ETHEL)

== Deaths ==
- January 5 – Roberto Gerhard, composer, 73
- January 9 – Jani Christou, composer, 44 (car accident)
- January 17
  - Simon Kovar, bassoonist
  - Billy Stewart, scat singer, 32 (car accident)
- January 25 – Jane Bathori, opera singer, 92
- January 31 – Slim Harpo, blues musician, 46 (heart attack)
- February 1 – Blaž Arnič, composer, 69 (car crash)
- February 12
  - Ishmon Bracey, blues musician, 69
  - Nick Pantas, guitarist (Elf) (car accident)
  - André Souris, composer and writer, 70
- February 19 – Pavel Ludikar, operatic bass, 87
- February 20 – Albert Wolff, conductor, 86
- March 1 – Lucille Hegamin, blues singer, 75
- March 16 – Tammi Terrell, singer, 24 (brain tumor)
- April 12 – Kerstin Thorborg, operatic contralto, 73
- April 20 – Shakeel Badayuni, songwriter, 53 (diabetes-related)
- April 21 – Earl Hooker, blues musician, 41 (tuberculosis)
- April 23 – Adeline Genée, ballerina
- April 24 – Otis Spann, blues musician, 40 (liver cancer)
- April 26 – Gypsy Rose Lee, burlesque entertainer, 59 (cancer)
- May 11 – Johnny Hodges, jazz musician, 62 (heart attack)
- May 14
  - Jack Fina, pianist and bandleader, 56 (heart attack)
  - Fred Hufsmith, tenor
- May 22 – John Waterhouse, Canadian violinist, conductor, and music educator, 92
- May 23 – Nydia Westman, actress and singer
- June – Calvin Boze, trumpeter and bandleader
- June 11 – Earl Grant, pianist and singer, 39 (car accident)
- June 16
  - Heino Eller, composer and music teacher
  - Lonnie Johnson, blues and jazz musician
- July 7 – Charles Tobias, US songwriter and singer
- July 12 – L. Wolfe Gilbert, Russian-born US songwriter
- July 13 – Roger Edens, composer and arranger, 64
- July 14 – Luis Mariano, singer and actor
- July 17 – Stanley Wilson, conductor, arranger and film composer, 54 (heart attack)
- July 23 – Leith Stevens, composer, 60 (heart attack)
- July 29 – Sir John Barbirolli, conductor and cellist, 70 (heart attack)
- July 29 – Jonel Perlea, Romanian conductor, 69
- July 30 – George Szell, conductor and composer, 73 (cancer)
- July 31 – Booker Ervin, jazz musician, 39 (kidney failure)
- August 10 – Bernd Alois Zimmermann, German composer, 52 (suicide)
- September 2
  - Mercedes Llopart, operatic soprano, 75
  - Kees van Baaren, composer and music teacher, 63
- September 3 – Alan Wilson, singer of Canned Heat, 27 (drug overdose)
- September 12 – Ottilie Sutro, piano duettist, 98
- September 18
  - Jimi Hendrix, guitarist and singer, 27 (pulmonary aspiration)
  - Maxwell Davis, saxophonist, 54
- September 25 – Yefim Golyshev, Ukrainian violinist, painter and composer, 73
- October 2 – Bo Linde, Swedish composer, 37
- October 4
  - Janis Joplin, singer, 27 (heroin overdose)
  - George Frederick McKay, composer, 71
- October 13 – Julia Culp, operatic soprano ("the Dutch nightingale"), 90
- October 22
  - Pauline Donalda, operatic soprano, 88
  - Samson François, pianist, 46
- October 28 – Baby Huey, singer, 26 (heart attack)
- November 6 – Agustín Lara, composer, 73
- November 7 – Eddie Peabody, banjo player, 68
- November 19 – Maria Yudina, pianist, 71
- November 25 – Albert Ayler, saxophonist and composer, 34
- December 19 – Giulia Recli, composer and writer, 80
- December 23 – Mimi Benzell, operatic soprano, 46 (cancer)
- December 31
  - Ray Henderson, songwriter, 74
  - Cyril Scott, composer, 91
- date unknown
  - Efisio Melis, folk musician
  - Rokneddin Mokhtari, Iranian violinist

== Awards ==
=== Grammy Awards ===
- Grammy Awards of 1970

=== Eurovision Song Contest ===
- Eurovision Song Contest 1970
