= The Beginning Vol. 5 =

Compilation album by Frijid Pink
- Released: 1973
- Recorded: 1969–1970
- Length: 44:51
- Label: Deram Records

Frijid Pink chronology
Earth Omen (1972)	The Beginning Vol. 5 (1973)	All Pink Inside (1975)

The Beginning Vol. 5 is the first and only single disc compilation released by Frijid Pink in 1973. This disc contains five songs from their first and second albums, Frijid Pink and Defrosted. This album was only released in Germany by Deram Records and possibly as an import throughout the rest of the world.

== Track listing ==
=== Side one ===
1. House of the Rising Sun (4:44)
2. Drivin' Blues (3:14)
3. Black Lace (6:10)
4. Bye Bye Blues (4:56)
5. God Gave Me You (3:35)

=== Side two ===
1. I'm Movin' (4:53)
2. Sloony (instrumental) (3:36)
3. I'm On My Way (4:34)
4. Tell Me Why (2:50)
5. Pain In My Heart (8:19)

== Personnel ==
- Kelly Green – lead vocals, percussion
- Gary Ray Thompson – guitars
- Tom Harris – bass (tracks 1,2,5,8,9)
- Tom Beaudry – bass (tracks 3,4,6,7,10)
- Richard "Rick" Stevers – drums
- Larry Zelanka – keyboards
