= Bruce Cockburn (disambiguation) =

Bruce Coburn or Cockburn may refer to:

- Bruce Cockburn (pronounced Coburn), Canadian musician
  - Bruce Cockburn (album)
- Bruce Coburn, character in 40 Guns to Apache Pass
