= 1933 in Nordic music =

The following is a list of notable events and compositions of the year 1933 in Nordic music.

== Events ==
- 22 April – YLE and the Helsinki City Orchestra broadcasts a programme of Sibelius compositions, with Anja Ignatius as soloist, to 14 countries in coordination with the International Broadcasting Union. The programme includes the tone poem The Oceanides, followed by his Fifth Symphony, and the Violin Concerto.
- 4 July – Australian composer Percy Grainger delivers a radio broadcast on "Characteristics of Nordic Music".
- 21 October – While touring Scandinavia, Louis Armstrong and his band are filmed for the first time, performing at the Lyric Park in Copenhagen.
- unknown date – Danish tenor Aksel Schiøtz makes his first recordings.

== New works ==
- Kurt Atterberg – A Varmland Rhapsody
- Edvin Kallstenius – Du gamla, du fria (orchestral arrangement)
- Ture Rangström – Partita in B minor

== Popular music ==
- Hugo Alfvén – "Vaggvisa"

== Film music ==
- Kai Normann Andersen – De blaa drenge
- Eric Bengtson – Hälsingar
- Victor Cornelius – Københavnere
- Sonja Sahlberg and Jules Sylvain – Vad veta väl männen

== Musical films ==
- I kongens klær, with music by Arne Svendsen

== Births ==
- 1 January – Bo Linde, Swedish composer (died 1970)
- 26 April – Ilkka Kuusisto, Finnish organist, choirmaster, conductor and composer (died 2025)
- 21 May – Ulf Björlin, Swedish conductor and composer (died 1993)
- 17 August – Bonna Søndberg, Danish operatic soprano and singing teacher
- 19 August – Asmund Bjørken, Norwegian accordionist and saxophonist (died 2018)

== Deaths ==
- 21 June – Alf Fasmer Dahl, priest and composer (born 1874)
- 6 July – Robert Kajanus, Finnish conductor and composer (born 1856)
- 29 July – Gerhard Schjelderup, Norwegian composer, known especially for his operas (born 1859)

== See also ==
- 1933 in Denmark
- 1933 in Iceland
- 1933 in Norwegian music
- 1933 in Sweden
