= Big Band sound =

Big Band Sound may refer to:

- Big Band, a genre of music associated with jazz which became popular during the Swing era
- "Big Band Sound", a 1970 album by Jo Stafford
