= Knef (album) =

Studio album by Hildegard Knef
- Released: February 1970
- Recorded: December 9–12, 1969
- Studio: Teldec Studios, Lichterfelde, Berlin, West Germany
- Genre: Schlager; psychedelic pop
- Length: 38:17
- Language: German
- Label: Decca (Teldec); Stern Musik
- Producer: David Cameron Palastanga

Hildegard Knef chronology
Love for Sale (1969)	Knef (1970)	Portrait in Musik (1970)

Singles from Knef
- 1. "Tapetenwechsel" / "Wieviel Menschen waren glücklich (daß du gelebt?)" Released: March 1970

Knef is a studio album by German actress and singer-songwriter Hildegard Knef. It was released in February 1970 on Teldec's Decca Records and Stern Musik, a music branding division of the magazine Stern.

== Track listing ==
All tracks are written by Hildegard Knef and Hans Hammerschmid

Side one
No.	Title	Length
1.	"Wieviel Menschen waren glücklich, daß du gelebt?"	3:12
2.	"Schwertfisch"	2:16
3.	"Ich brauch’ Tapetenwechsel"	2:25
4.	"Insel meiner Angst"	2:37
5.	"Elvira O."	2:15
6.	"Friedenskampf und Schadenfreude"	5:51

Side two
No.	Title	Length
7.	"Liebe auf den hundertsten Blick"	2:53
8.	"Mein Zeitbegriff"	2:43
9.	"Der Tag holt Luft"	3:24
10.	"Im achtzigsten Stockwerk"	3:10
11.	"Die Herren dieser Welt"	3:58
12.	"Eisblumen"	3:33
Total length:		38:17

== Personnel ==
Credits adapted from Knef's liner notes.

- Hildegard Knef – primary artist, vocals
- Hans Hammerschmid – arrangements, conducting
  - Hans Hammerschmid and his Orchestra – orchestra
- The Rosy-Singers – choir
- David Cameron Palastanga – producer
- Martin Fouqué – engineer
- Horst Angenendt – mastering
- Rico Puhlmann – cover art
- Ursula Marquardt – cover art

== See also ==
- 1970 in music
- Music of Germany
- Baroque pop
- Jazz pop
