= All Pink Inside =

Studio album by Frijid Pink
- Released: 1974
- Recorded: March 1974 at Fantasy Studios, Berkeley, California
- Length: 35:48
- Label: Fantasy Records
- Producer: Vinnie Testa

Frijid Pink chronology
The Beginning Vol. 5 (1973)	All Pink Inside (1974)	Inner Heat (2002)

Professional ratings
Review scores
Source	Rating
AllMusic	2/5 stars
The Encyclopedia of Popular Music	2/5 stars

All Pink Inside is an album by the American band Frijid Pink. The band includes long-time original drummer Richard "Rick" Stevers, along with new members Jo Baker (vocals) and bassist Larry Popolizio. Frijid Pink returned to their blues rock roots without the added heavy psychedelia heard on the previous three albums.

The album contains a cover of Chuck Berry's "School Days."

== Track listing ==
1. "Money Man" (Reggie Vincent) - 2:57
2. "Put It In Your Pocket" (Vincent) - 3:16
3. "Portrait" (Riggs, Habeman) - 2:14
4. "Gonna Get It Yet" (Jo Baker, Craig Webb, Larry Popolizio) - 3:39
5. "Paula In My Dreams" (Popolizio) - 3:09
6. "A Day Late, A Dollar Short" (Baker, Webb, Popolizio) - 3:04
7. "Got To Go Back (San Francisco Bay)" (Vincent) - 2:27
8. "Take Me To Your Palace" (Baker, Webb) - 3:38
9. "School Days" (Chuck Berry) - 3:43
10. "Lovely Lady" (Baker) - 4:26
11. "(There Ain't No) Rock And Roll In China" (Vincent) - 3:09

== Personnel ==
- Jo Baker - lead vocals, harmonica
- Rick Stevers - drums
- Craig Webb - guitars
- Larry Popolizio - bass

Additional:

- Rockin' Reggie Vincent - vocals
- David Ahlers - piano
