= Earth Omen =

Studio album by Frijid Pink
- Released: 1972
- Studio: Eastern Sound Studios
- Length: 39:12
- Label: Lion Records

Frijid Pink chronology
| Defrosted (1970) | Earth Omen (1972) | The Beginning Vol. 5 (1973) |

Professional ratings
Review scores
| Source | Rating |
|---|---|
| AllMusic | 3/5 stars |

Earth Omen is the third album by American rock band Frijid Pink, released in 1972.

The band, recently abandoned by their original singer and guitarist, shed their blues-based rock sound and picked up a more progressive rock sound (reminiscent of Uriah Heep), with added psychedelia. This was largely thanks to the addition of singer Jon Wearing, guitarist Craig Webb, and keyboardist Larry Zelanka (Zelanka was only considered a guest on the previous two albums).

The German CD release (Repertoire Records) features two bonus tracks.

== Track listing ==
1. "Miss Evil" – 6:24
2. "Sailor" – 4:21
3. "Earth Omen" – 3:32
4. "Lazy Day" – 4:38
5. "Train Woman" – 3:59
6. "Eternal Dream" – 4:18
7. "New Horizon" – 4:20
8. "Rainbow Rider" – 2:57
9. "Mr. Blood" – 4:39

== Bonus tracks ==
1. "Lazy Day" (Single Edit) – 3:07
2. "Go Now" (Non-Album Single) – 2:57

== Personnel ==
- Jon Wearing – lead vocals
- Richard Stevers – drums
- Tom Harris – bass
- Craig Webb – guitars

Additional:

- Larry Zelanka – keyboards
