= 1970 in Nordic music =

The following is a list of notable events and releases that happened in Scandinavian music in 1970.

== Events ==
- 11 March – At the 12th Annual Grammy Awards presented in the United States, Danish jazz violinist Svend Asmussen is co-nominated in the Best Jazz Instrumental Album category, for Violin Summit, on which he performs with Stéphane Grappelli and others.
- 21 March – The 15th Eurovision Song Contest is held in Dublin, and is won by Ireland. Finland, Norway and Sweden all boycott the contest.

== New works ==
- Ulf Grahn – Calling
- Per Nørgård – Symphony No. 2
- Allan Pettersson – Symphony No. 9
- Dag Wirén – String Quartet no. 5

== Popular music ==
- Jan Johansson – "Här kommer Pippi Långstrump" (#1 Denmark), recorded by Inger Nilsson
- Hootenanny Singers – "Omkring Tiggarn Från Luossa"

== Hit albums ==
- Made in Sweden – Made in England

== Recordings ==
- Svein Finnerud Trio – Plastic Sun

== Film and television music ==
- Sven Gyldmark – Hurra for de blå husarer
- Bengt-Arne Wallin – Ann och Eve - de erotiska

== Musical films ==
- Pippi Långstrump på de sju haven, with music by Georg Riedel & Jan Johansson
- Song of Norway, based on music by Edvard Grieg, starring Toralv Maurstad and Christina Schollin

== Births ==
- 8 February – Lotta Wennäkoski, Finnish composer
- 28 February – Linda Brava, Finnish violinist
- 11 April – Whigfield (Sannie Charlotte Carlson), Danish singer

== Deaths ==
- 12 April – Kerstin Thorborg, Swedish opera singer (born 1896)
- 15 August – Karl Andersen, Norwegian cellist and composer
- 2 October – Bo Linde, Swedish composer (born 1933)

== See also ==
- 1970 in Denmark
- 1970 in Iceland
- 1970 in Norwegian music
- 1970 in Sweden
