= The Street People =

The Street People was an R&B/disco group from New Jersey who first began recording in 1974. They were produced by Ray Dahrouge, and initially recorded for Spring Records, but their first single flopped. After switching to Vigor Records, they released a full-length self-titled album in 1976 and had several hit singles on the US Billboard R&B chart.

== Members ==
- Roy Daniels
- Milton Daniels
- Thomas "Toot" Williams
- Joe Gardner
- Rick Johnson
- Clark Pitman

== Singles ==
Year	Title	Chart Positions	
Year	Title	US R&B Singles	US Disco Singles
1974	"I Wanna Get Over"	-	-
1975	"Never Get Enough of Your Love"	98	5
1976	"I Wanna Spend My Whole Life with You"	57	-
1976	"Wanna Slow Dance with You Baby (At the Disco)"	66	-
1976	"You're My One Weakness Girl"	13	12
1977	"Liberated Lady"	93	-
