= Frijid Pink =

American rock band

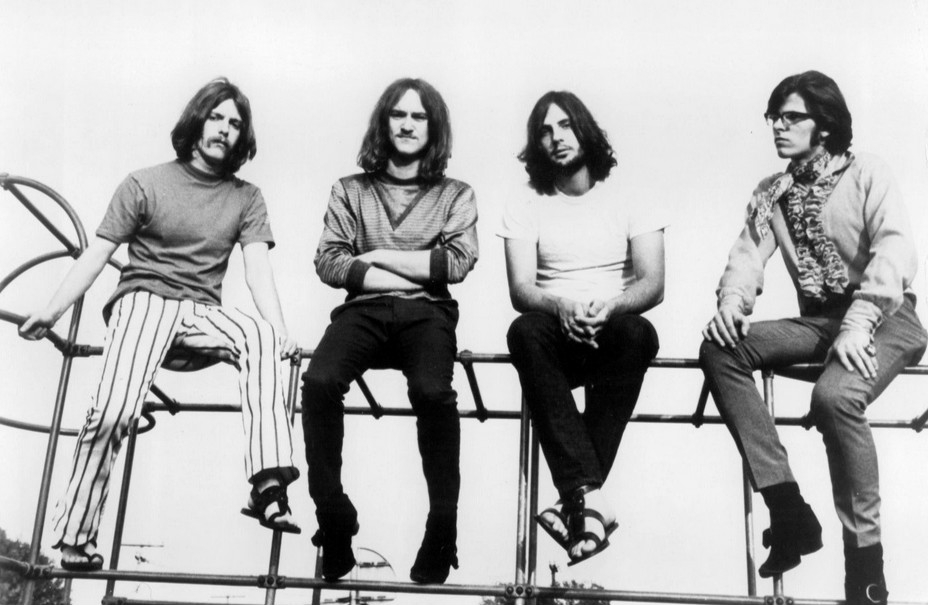
- Frijid Pink in 1970

Background information
- Origin: Detroit, Michigan, U.S.
- Genres: Psychedelic rock; blues rock; hard rock
- Years active: 1967–1975; 2007–present
- Labels: Parrot; Deram; Lion; Fantasy
- Members: Rick Stevers; Brent Austin; Ricky Houke; Chuck Mangus; Rick Zeithaml
- Website: frijidpink.com

Frijid Pink is an American rock band, formed in Detroit in 1967, best known for their 1969 rendition of "The House of the Rising Sun".

The initial line-up of the band included drummer Richard Stevers, guitarist Gary Ray Thompson, bassist Tom Harris, lead singer Tom Beaudry (aka Kelly Green), and later added Larry Zelanka as off-staff keyboardist. On their album, All Pink Inside, the line-up was Craig Webb, guitar, Larry Popolizio, bass, Rick Stevers, drums, and Jo Baker harmonica/vocal, with the addition of Rockin' Reggie Vincent, vocals, and David Ahlers, piano. Over 35 years would pass before the next album would be released.

== History ==
Frijid Pink formed when local Detroit-area cover band the Detroit Vibrations, which featured Stevers and Harris, were joined by guitarist Gary Ray Thompson and singer Tom Beaudry, who later took the stage name Kelly Green. Thompson convinced Vibrations' manager Clyde Stevers (Richard's father) that he was a better musician than the Vibrations' current guitarist. The group spent their first two years touring throughout the Southeast Michigan/Detroit area and eventually signed with Parrot Records. Their first two singles, "Tell Me Why" (#70 Canada) and "Drivin' Blues" (both released in 1969) failed to attract much attention, but their third 1969 effort, a distorted guitar-driven rendition of "House of the Rising Sun," reached the Top Ten on the US Billboard Hot 100 in the spring of 1970. This disc sold over one million copies, thereby receiving a gold disc. The track also peaked at No. 4 in the UK Singles Chart and No. 3 in the Canadian RPM Magazine charts. The song was a "filler," using up time at the end of a recording session. The band was popular in their native Detroit area. Frijid Pink often shared billing with the likes of the MC5, the Stooges, the Amboy Dukes, and other local groups.

Frijid Pink's self-titled debut LP followed in 1970, as did their second release Defrosted, with virtually all of the album's writing being provided by the duo of Beaudry and Thompson. Subsequent singles including "Sing A Song For Freedom" and a cover of "Heartbreak Hotel" failed to match earlier successes, and after Beaudry and Thompson failed in an attempt to reform the group, a new lineup was created featuring David Alexander (later Jon Wearing) on vocals, Craig Webb on guitar, and Larry Zelanka on keyboards. This version of the group recorded 1972's Earth Omen. The group would have another lineup in place before re-entering the studio to record 1975's All Pink Inside with Jo Baker on vocals and Larry Popolizio playing the bass.

In 1981 Stevers and Harris joined forces with Arlen Viecelli, lead singer/guitarist of Salem Witchcraft, and Ray Gunn, guitarist of Virgin Dawn, to record an album at Sound Suite studio in Detroit. The music was written by Viecelli and Gunn and was set to be released in the summer of 1982. However, after failed negotiation attempts with various record companies by the group's manager (the aforementioned Clyde Stevers), the group disbanded and the material was never released.

Another lineup of the band (featuring no past members) formed in 2001. They recorded one album, Inner Heat, which was set for release in 2002. After a single show, which did not feature the band's biggest hit, the album was pulled by the record label, Dynasty Records. In 2005 yet another lineup formed featuring most of the original members; drummer Stevers had succeeded in getting bassist Tom Harris and vocalist Tom Beaudry together with guitarist Steve Dansby (from a late 1970s line-up of Cactus) and unknown keyboardist Larin Michaels.

In late 2006, after another failed attempt to reunite the original members, Stevers began auditioning guitarists for the reformation of Frijid Pink. A keyboard player was also recruited. Over the course of the next five years, this new lineup would play a dozen or so gigs, such as local venues and street fairs, but, without proper management, never had any steady work or did any touring. The focus shifted to basement recording and piecing an album together, which was released in March 2011 on the Repertoire label. This album, available in the U.S. as an import, is composed of re-recorded renditions of songs from the group's previous albums and new original music. In late 2011, the lead singer/guitarist/engineer and the keyboard player were replaced, thus ending the longest contiguous line-up in the band's history at that point. Recording and performing continued in a similar fashion with this latest lineup, and an EP was released in late spring of 2012. An EP, entitled "Taste of Pink" was released in early 2017, featuring 3 new songs and a newly recorded version of House of the Rising Sun. The three new songs featured on the EP were included in the 2018 album On the Edge.

In 2013, Frijid Pink was inducted into the Michigan Rock and Roll Legends Hall of Fame.

== Members ==
Current members

- Rick Stevers – drums
- Brent Austin – bass guitar, vocals
- Ricky Houke – guitar, vocals
- Chuck Mangus – keyboards, harmonica
- Rick Zeithaml – guitar, vocals

Former members

- Craig Webb – guitar
- Gary Ray Thompson – guitar
- Jo Baker – vocals, harmonica
- David Alexander – vocals, blues harp
- Jon Wearing – vocals
- Larry Zelanka – keyboards
- Reggie Vincent – vocals
- Tom Harris – bass guitar
- Nicholas Misiak (AKA Kelly Brown) – mud bone, back-up vocals to the back-up vocals
- Tom Beaudry (AKA Kelly Green) – vocals (died 2021)
- Josh Lerut (AKA Charlie Daniels) – harmonica, back up bass
- Bobby Gilbert (Bobby G) – guitar
- Danny Romanek – vocals
- Dave Akers – bass guitar
- Unnamed others

== Discography ==
=== Albums ===
Year	Title	Chart positions			
Year	Title	US	CAN	GER	AUS
1970	Frijid Pink	11	5	37	24
1970	Defrosted	149	53	–	–
1972	Earth Omen	–	–	–	–
1974	All Pink Inside	–	–	–	–
2011	Frijid Pink	–	–	–	–
2014	Made in Detroit	–	–	–	–
2017	Taste of Pink (EP)	–	–	–	–
2018	On the Edge	–	–	–	–

=== Singles ===
Year	Title	Chart positions				
Year	Title	US	CAN	UK	GER	AUS
1969	"Tell Me Why"	–	70	–	–	–
1969	"Drivin' Blues"	–	–	–	–	–
1969	"House of the Rising Sun"	7	3	4	1	15
1970	"Sing a Song for Freedom"	55	22	–	33	91
1970	"Heartbreak Hotel"	72	38	–	–	–
1971	"Music for the People"	–	–	–	–	–
1971	"We're Gonna Be There"	–	–	–	–	–
1972	"I Love Her"	–	–	–	–	–
1972	"Earth Omen"	–	–	–	–	–
1972	"Go Now"	–	–	–	–	–
1973	"Big Betty"	–	–	–	–	–

=== Compilation albums ===
- The Beginning Vol. 5 (Deram) 1973. German compilation; rare import
- Hibernated (2002) 3-CD Box Set that includes first three albums plus non-album singles
