= Giulia Recli =

Italian composer

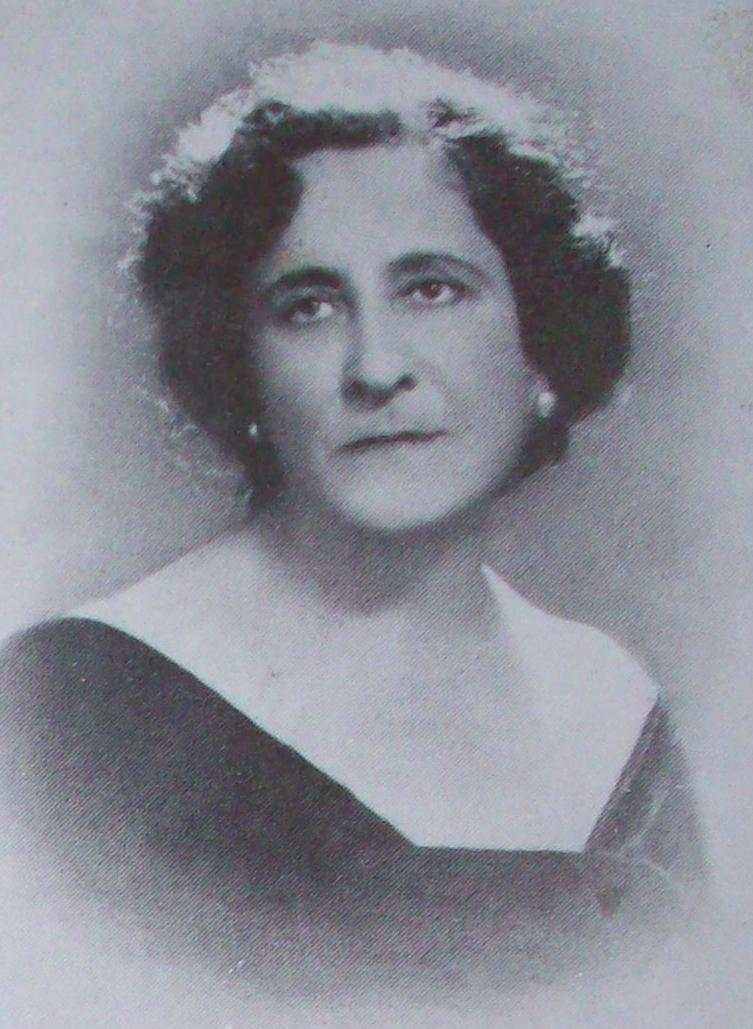
Giulia Recli

Giulia Recli (1890 – 19 December 1970) was an Italian composer and essayist. She won first and second prizes at musical competitions in New York, and her works Chimes at Sunrise and Nicolette s'Endorte were performed by the Metropolitan Opera. A concert of her work alongside that of three other women composers was performed in a symphony concert in Rome in 1965. Her music was also acclaimed in Germany. Recli was awarded the title Cavaliere Ufficiale della Repubblica Italiana.

== Life ==
Born in Milan, Recli's mother was a pianist and she grew up in a musical household. Recli was a student under Ildebrando Pizzetti and Victor de Sabata, learning piano, composition and singing. She was awarded first and second prizes at New York musical competitions. Recli's works were introduced to American audiences by Tullio Serafin. In 1926, at a Metropolitan Opera concert headlining Belgian violinist, César Thomson, Recli's Chimes at Sunrise was performed. In 1931, Recli's Nicolette s'Endorte, described by The New York Times as a "graceful lullaby", was performed at the Metropolitan Opera by Mario Vitetta (solo violin) in a concert devoted to the French Tenor Georges Thill. In 1965 a concert of her work and three other female composers was performed in Rome at an RAI symphony concert, conducted by pioneering woman Italian conductor Erminia Romano. The other composers were Sandra Caratelli Surace, Norma Beecroft of Canada, and Claude Arrieu of France.

Cohen describes her as the first Italian woman to have her music acclaimed in Germany. She was awarded the title Cavaliere Ufficiale della Repubblica Italiana.
