= Frijid Pink (album) =

Studio album by Frijid Pink
- Released: January 25th 1970
- Length: 39:46
- Label: Parrot Records
- Producer: Michael Valvano

Frijid Pink chronology
Frijid Pink (1970)	Defrosted (1970)

Singles from Frijid Pink
- 1. "Tell Me Why" Released: December 1968; 2. "God Gave Me You" Released: August 1969; 3. "House of the Rising Sun" Released: December 1969

Frijid Pink is the debut album by American rock band Frijid Pink. It was originally released early 1970 by London Records' now-defunct Parrot subsidiary label (cat. no. PAS 71033). The album featured the single "House of the Rising Sun", which reached #7 on the Billboard Hot 100, and minor hit such as "Tell Me Why", which reached #70 in Canada in May 1969.

Professional ratings
Review scores
Source	Rating
Allmusic	link

== Track listing errors ==
The album was released on German CD (1991, Repertoire Records) including two bonus tracks ("Heartbreak Hotel" and "Music For The People") that were originally released as singles in 1970 and 1971, respectively. One of the CD later re-releases, being the most widely distributed copies, were missing tracks 5 and 6 of the nine tracks on the original LP.

== Track listing ==
All tracks were written by Gary Ray Thompson and Tom Beaudry, except where noted.

Side one
No.	Title	Writer(s)	Length
1.	"God Gave Me You"		3:35
2.	"Crying Shame"	Michael Valvano	3:11
3.	"I'm on My Way"		4:34
4.	"Drivin' Blues"		3:14
5.	"Tell Me Why"		2:50

Side two
No.	Title	Writer(s)	Length
1.	"End of the Line"		4:07
2.	"House of the Rising Sun"	Traditional, arr. Alan Price	4:44
3.	"I Want to Be Your Lover"	Thompson, Beaudry, Valvano	7:30
4.	"Boozin' Blues"		6:01

Bonus track on European re-release
No.	Title	Writer(s)	Length
10.	"Heartbreak Hotel"	Mae Boren Axton, Thomas Durden, Elvis Presley	2:49
11.	"Music for the People"		2:54

== Charts ==
Chart (1970)	Peak position
Australian (Kent Music Report)	24
Canada (RPM)	5

== Personnel ==
- Kelly Green – lead vocals
- Gary Ray Thompson – guitar
- Tom Harris – bass
- Richard Stevers – drums

Additional:

- Larry Zelanka – keyboards
