= Afreaka! =

Studio album by Demon Fuzz
- Released: November 1970
- Recorded: Summer 1970
- Genre: Progressive rock; funk; psychedelic soul; jazz fusion
- Length: 40:46
- Label: Dawn
- Producer: Barry Murray

Demon Fuzz chronology
Afreaka! (1970)	Roots and Offshoots (1976)

Professional ratings
Review scores
Source	Rating
Allmusic	4.5/5 stars

Afreaka! was the first album released by the English rock band Demon Fuzz. It was initially issued in 1970 by Dawn Records, to which the group was signed. The following year, a U.S. pressing was made by Janus Records (catalog number JLS 3028). It was a Billboard "4-STAR" selection in June 1971. In the 21st century, another pressing on vinyl was made by Janus under the same catalog number as the 1971 edition.

Three CD reissues were produced, all of which include as bonus tracks 'Message To Mankind', 'Fuzz Oriental Blues' and the band's cover of Screamin' Jay Hawkins' 'I Put A Spell On You', all from the group's 1970 maxi-single. In Japan, a two-CD (12-cm and 8-cm) set in a gatefold paper sleeve was made by Arcàngelo in 2004. Castle Music released a CD (catalog number CMRCD 1197) in 2005. Esoteric Recordings in the UK issued a CD in 2009 (catalog number ECLEC2111).

The musical style has predominantly been described as progressive rock, psychedelic soul and funk, as well as acid rock, jazz fusion and jazz rock. The recording is sometimes sampled by latter-day DJs.

== Track listing ==
Side A
No.	Title	Writer(s)	Length
1.	"Past, Present, and Future"	Ray Rhoden; W. Raphael Joseph	9:43
2.	"Disillusioned Man"	Ray Rhoden; W. Raphael Joseph	4:53
3.	"Another Country" (The Electric Flag cover)	Ron Polte	8:20
Total length:			22:59

Side B
No.	Title	Writer(s)	Length
4.	"Hymn to Mother Earth"	Ray Rhoden; W. Raphael Joseph	7:55
5.	"Mercy (Variation No. 1)"	Ray Harris	9:35
Total length:			17:31

Compact disc bonus tracks
No.	Title	Writer(s)	Length
6.	"I Put a Spell on You" (Screamin' Jay Hawkins cover)	Jay Hawkins	3:55
7.	"Message to Mankind"		3:54
8.	"Fuzz Oriental Blues"		6:45

== Credits ==
- Sleepy Jack Joseph - bass
- Ayinde Folarin - congas
- Paddy Corea - congas, flute, sax, arrangements
- Steven John - drums
- W. Raphael Joseph - guitar
- Ray Rhoden - piano, organ
- Barry Murray - production
- Clarance Brooms Crosdale - trombone
- Smokey Adams - vocals
