= Defrosted =

Studio album by Frijid Pink
- Released: June 1970
- Recorded: Mediasound, New York City
- Length: 40:19
- Label: Parrot Records
- Producer: Pink Unlimited

Frijid Pink chronology
Frijid Pink (1970)	Defrosted (1970)	Earth Omen (1972)

Defrosted is the second album by American rock band Frijid Pink. Released in the summer of 1970, the album is more blues-based hard rock than its predecessor, yet still contains the characteristic fuzz guitar sound featured prominently on the group's first album, Frijid Pink. This is the last album to feature Kelly Green (Tom Beaudry) and Gary Ray Thompson; their departure from the group soon followed, fueled by an ego-driven notion that 'they' were Frijid Pink. The band were on the brink of major success at that time, but this breach of contract essentially ruined their chances. The LP reached only #149 on U.S. charts, although the debut one reached #11; the track "Sing A Song For Freedom" as a single made #55 in the US in July 1970 and #22 in Canada that September where the LP reached #54. German CD release (1997, Repertoire Records) includes four bonus tracks taken from 1971 and 1972 singles.

== Track listing ==
All titles by Thompson & Beaudry except where noted.

1. "Black Lace" – 6:10
2. "Sing A Song For Freedom" (Thompson, Beaudry, Stevers) – 3:00
3. "I'll Never Be Lonely" (Thompson, Beaudry, Harris) – 5:01
4. "Bye Bye Blues" – 4:56
5. "Pain In My Heart" – 8:19
6. "Sloony" (instrumental) (Thompson, Harris, Stevers) – 3:36
7. "I'm Movin'" – 4:53
8. "I Haven't Got The Time" – 4:21

=== Bonus tracks ===
1. "We're Gonna Be There" – 2:28
2. "Shorty Kline" – 2:19
3. "I Love Her" – 2:20
4. "Lost Son" – 2:45

Tracks 1–8 produced by Pink Unlimited, bonus tracks by Pink and Vinnie Testa

== Personnel ==
=== Frijid Pink ===
- Kelly Green – vocals, cowbell
- Gary Ray Thompson – lead & rhythm guitars
- Tom Harris – bass
- Richard Stevers – drums, tympani

=== Additional Musicians ===
- Larry Zelanka – keyboards

=== Personnel Notes ===
Tom Beaudry a.k.a. Kelly Green did not play bass guitar on this album, only contributed the vocals. This caused confusion because the similarity of the names of the bassist Tom Harris and the vocalist Tom Beaudry, and the bass was credited to Beaudry, but Tom Harris played here and it appears in the album cover, also appears in 1970 TV shows playing "Sing A Song For Freedom".
