= Demon Fuzz =

English rock band

- Origin: England
- Genres: Afro rock, psychedelic soul, progressive rock
- Years active: 1968–1972
- Label: Dawn

Demon Fuzz was an English rock band which was formed in 1968 and broke up in 1972. Its members had all immigrated to Britain from Caribbean Commonwealth countries. The band's name means "devil's children or bad policemen". Their album, Afreaka!, has become a popular source for sampling. Since 2008, they have received sporadic airplay by the BBC radio presenters Huey Morgan and Gideon Coe.

== History ==
The band was promoted by The Red Bus Company agency in London, which also handled Mungo Jerry, Mike Cooper, Titus Groan and Wildmouth which arranged for them to appear at a concert incongruously named the "Hollywood Music Festival", in May 1970 at a Leycett farm near Newcastle-under-Lyme.

They played at the Phun City Festival, "a major concert event in Worthing".

In November 1970, the band played a series of ten concerts called "A Penny Concert" along with Titus Groan, Heron and Comus. Among performances was one at the Marquee Club.

They appeared on the BBC television show Disco 2 produced by Stephen Clive Turner who had been offered (but did not take) 25 pounds for having them on the program. After he told BBC management about the incident, he was fired. Subsequently, the News of the World ran a story about the event.

They signed with the Dawn Records division of Pye Records, for whom they released two recordings: the studio album Afreaka! (catalogue number DNLS 3013) and a maxi-single with the songs "I Put a Spell on You" (written by Screamin' Jay Hawkins), "Message To Mankind" and "Fuzz Oriental Blues", both released in 1970.

Demon Fuzz's cover version of "I Put a Spell on You" was included in the 1971 sampler album, The Dawn Take-Away Concert (catalogue number DNLB 3024). Priced at 99 pence, the LP also had songs by Mungo Jerry, Comus, The Trio, Heron, Paul Brett's Sage, Mike Cooper, Atlantic Bridge, Jackie McAuley, Bronx Cheer, John Surman, John McLaughlin, Dave Holland, Stu Martin, Karl Berger and the Be-Bop Preservation Society.

A Demon Fuzz maxi-single was published by Nippon Columbia around 1971. The maxi-single was later made available as a CD.

Afreaka! was distributed in the United States by Janus Records (catalogue number JLS 3028). It was a Billboard "4-STAR" selection in June 1971.

Around 1971, their song "Hymn to Mother Earth" was included in the WDAS-FM Black Rock compilation album.

In 1976, after the band dissolved, their second album, Roots and Offshoots, was self-published under the Paco Media Inc. label.

A 1999 compilation CD, From Calypso to Disco: The Roots of Black Britain, includes the Demon Fuzz' recording of "Message to Mankind".

Their performance of "Mercy" is included in Harmless Records' 2002 compilation CD (also published as a double-LP set) Paint It Black: Kaleidoscopic Funk Collision.

In 2003, the Get Away label made a vinyl reissue in Italy of The Dawn Take-Away Concert (catalogue number GET 626).

Another vinyl pressing was made by Janus under the same catalogue number as the 1971 edition.

== Musical style ==
Demon Fuzz is often classified as an Afro rock band. The band's music was influenced by West African music, calypso, soul, jazz, and ska, and saxophonist/founder Paddy Corea had a background in playing ska music. The music they heard during a trip to Morocco led to a change in their style.

== Discography ==
- Afreaka! (1970)
- Roots and Offshoots (1976)

== Members ==
- Paddy Corea, tenor saxophone, soprano saxophone, flute, vibes, congas
- Ray Rhoden, piano and organ
- Sleepy Jack Joseph, bass guitar
- Smokey Adams, vocals
- Steven John, drums
- W. (Winston) Raphael Joseph, guitar
- Clarence Crosdale, trombone
- Ayinde Folarin: credited with "additional congas" on Afreaka!. He was brought in on the recording session only.

== Additional sources ==
- Corbett, John. "Afreaka!: Demon Fuzz" Down Beat 71. 1 (January 2004): 18.
- Thompson, Ben. "Pop: Demon Fuzz: Afreaka!", The Sunday Telegraph 8 January 2006: p. 36.
- "Demon Fuzz" (PDF). Beat Instrumental and International Recording Studio. No. 93. London: Beat Publications Ltd. January 1971. p. 18. ISSN 0144-5804. Archived from the original (PDF) on 2 December 2024 – via World Radio History.
