= Big Band Sound (album) =

Compilation album by Jo Stafford
- Released: January 1, 1970
- Genre: Traditional pop, jazz
- Label: Corinthian

Professional ratings
Review scores
Source	Rating
Allmusic	4.5/5 stars

Big Band Sound is a 1970 compilation album of standards by Jo Stafford. The songs were recorded between 1960 and 1970 and see Stafford backed by a number of big band arrangers, notably her husband Paul Weston, as well as Billy May and Benny Carter. The album was released on the Corinthian label.

== Track listing ==
1. "Love for Sale"
2. "I Got It Bad (and That Ain't Good)"
3. "Taking a Chance on Love"
4. "Early Autumn"
5. "Speak Low"
6. "Candy"
7. "Any Place I Hang My Hat Is Home"
8. "Old Devil Moon"
9. "Teach Me Tonight"
10. "The Night We Called It a Day"
11. "The One I Love (Belongs to Somebody Else)"
12. "Anything Goes"
13. "What'cha Know Joe?"
14. "Tomorrow Mountain"

== Personnel ==
- Jo Stafford - vocals
- Paul Weston - arranger
- Billy May - arranger
- Benny Carter - arranger
