= Bruce Cockburn (album) =

Studio album by Bruce Cockburn
- Released: 1970
- Recorded: 1969
- Genre: Folk
- Length: 35:29
- Labels: True North (Canada); Epic Records (United States)
- Producer: Eugene Martynec

Bruce Cockburn chronology
Bruce Cockburn (1970)	High Winds, White Sky (1971)

Singles from Bruce Cockburn
- 1. "Going to the Country" Released: 1970; 2. "Musical Friends" Released: 1970

Professional ratings
Review scores
Source	Rating
AllMusic	(not rated)

Bruce Cockburn is singer/songwriter Bruce Cockburn's debut album. The album was originally released in 1970 and is the first album to be released by True North Records. It climbed to No. 65 on the Canadian album chart published by RPM. "Going to the Country" and "Musical Friends" were released as singles in Canada, which both reached the top 40 of RPM's adult contemporary chart. The album received a Canadian gold certification in 1995.

== Background ==
For his debut, Cockburn favored sparse arrangements, consisting primarily of acoustic guitar (and occasional piano) with some support from Dennis Pendrith on bass. The lyrics are introspective in tone, unlike the more politically charged themes Cockburn would explore later in his career.

Discussing the album, Cockburn said that "In 1969, when I was feeling the need to record an album of the songs I'd been writing, I had no concept of what that might lead to. In some organic way it felt like it was time." By the end of the 1960s, Cockburn had written around 20 songs, which were largely centered around folk arrangements and what he described as a "reportage approach to lyric writing" that was observational in tone. One of those songs was "Going to the Country", which emerged while he was riding in the passenger seat of a vehicle traveling to Montreal.

Promotional efforts for the album included stops to radio stations and stores across Canada. Bernie Finkelstein of True North also launched a promotional campaign with Columbia Records to bolster album sales. RPM commented that Cockburn's contacts with the Canadian press and radio further assisted the album and its single, "Going to the Country".

Bruce Cockburn was released in the United States on July 1, 1971 by Epic Records through an agreement made by True North Records. This signing preceded the Canadian release of Cockburn's second album, High Winds, White Sky. Cockburn expressed his belief that CBS, which handled the distribution of Bruce Cockburn, did "nothing" to promote the album.

== Critical reception ==
Reviewing Cockburn's self-titled album, RPM called Cockburn "an amazing talent" and said that "the set is definitely headed for the international market". Writing for AllMusic, Roch Parisien said that his self-titled album contained a "blend of diversity, enthusiasm, and innocence never quite resurfaced again in his work, especially in his more clinical, politically inclined tracts of later decades."

== Track listing ==
All tracks are written by Bruce Cockburn.

No.	Title	Length
1.	"Going to the Country"	3:10
2.	"Thoughts on a Rainy Afternoon"	3:42
3.	"Together Alone"	2:42
4.	"Bicycle Trip"	4:05
5.	"13th Mountain"	4:45
6.	"Musical Friends"	2:54
7.	"Change Your Mind"	2:19
8.	"Man of a Thousand Face"	5:40
9.	"Spring Song"	4:19
10.	"Keep It Open"	1:40

== Personnel ==
Musicians

- Bruce Cockburn – guitars, piano, bass drum
- Michael Ferry – tongue
- Dennis Pendrith – bass

Technical

- Eugene Martynec – production and electronics
- Bill Seddon – engineer
- Meek Cairo Brown – cover design and illustration
- Tim Saunders – photography

== Chart performance ==
Chart (1970)	Peak position
Canada Top Albums (RPM)	65

== Certifications ==
Certifications and sales for Bruce Cockburn
Region	Certification	Certified units/sales
Canada (Music Canada)	Gold	50,000^{^}
^{*} Sales figures based on certification alone.^{^} Shipments figures based on certification alone.
