= Bo Linde =

Swedish composer

Anders Bo Leif Linde (1 January 1933 – 2 October 1970) was a Swedish composer whose style resembled that of notable 20th-century neoclassical composers like Benjamin Britten and Samuel Barber.

Born in Gävle, Linde studied music theory with Eric Harald Bengtson before enrolling at the Royal Swedish Academy of Music in 1948, where he studied composition with Lars-Erik Larsson and piano with Olof Wibergh. In 1953, one year after leaving the academy, he went to Vienna to study conducting and traveled around Europe before returning to Sweden. His most performed pieces are his violin concerto, and his Preludio E finale for string orchestra of 1955. His piano concertos display a raucous humour, also found in his children's opera for radio Slotts-skoj (1959).

Bo Linde died of unclear health issues in Gävle Hospital at the age of 37.

== Works ==
Symphonies

- Symphony No. 1 (Sinfonia fantasia), op. 1 (1951)
- Symphony No. 2 (dedicated to the Lions Club of Gävle), op. 23 (1960)
- Symphony No. 3

Piano Concertos

- Piano Concerto in E major (without op.9 (1950-51)
- Piano Concerto No. 1, op.12 (1954)
- Piano Concerto No. 2, op. 17 (1956)

Other Orchestral Works

- Cello Concerto (written for Guido Vecchi), op. 29 (1964-65)
- Violin Concerto (dedicated to Josef Grunfard), op. 18 (1957)
- Concerto for Orchestra, op. 26 (1961-62)
- Pezzo Concertante, op. 41 (1970)
- Pensiere sopra un cantico vecchio, op.35 (1967)
- A Merry Overture, op. 14 (1954)
- Suite for small orchestra, op. 21 ((1959)
- Old-Fashioned Suite for small string orchestra (Gammalmodig Svi), op. 13 (1954)
- Ballet Blanc, Divertisment for orchestra, op. 3 (1952)
- Suite Boulogne, op. 32 (1966)

There is also chamber music for a variety of instruments, choral music, and a large number of songs.
