= 1969 in music =

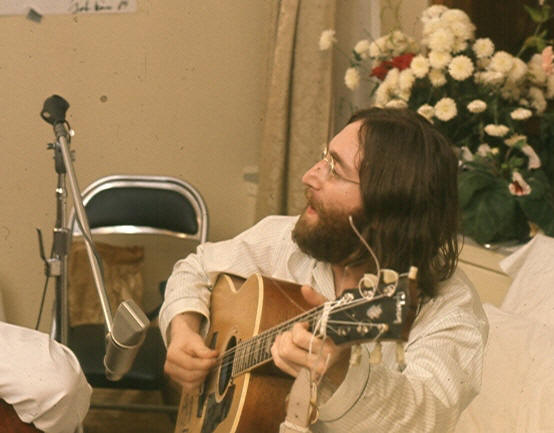
John Lennon rehearses "Give Peace a Chance", 1969.

List of notable events in music that took place in the year 1969.

== Specific locations ==
- 1969 in British music
- 1969 in Japanese music
- 1969 in Norwegian music

== Specific genres ==
- 1969 in country music
- 1969 in heavy metal music
- 1969 in jazz
- 1969 in progressive rock

== Events ==
=== Summary ===
Among the most significant musical events of 1969 were concerts. At a Rolling Stones concert in Altamont, California, a fan was stabbed to death by Hells Angels, a biker gang that had been hired to provide security for the event. In retrospect, some commentators have concluded that the violence signaled the end of the "hippie" movement, which espoused an ethos of free love and peace. Even more significant was the Woodstock festival, where some of the most famous performers in the world at the time played together in an atmosphere of peace with nature and love, with many thousands of concert goers; it is still one of the largest concerts in the history of the world. The presence of Ravi Shankar reflected a growing interest in Indian and other Eastern music; Shankar later said that the 1960s "got India wrong". "Black Woodstock", the Harlem Cultural Festival, took place in New York City. The Beatles' rooftop concert was the last time the band played together in public. The 1967 musical Hair, originally performed off-Broadway, had generated an album and multiple chart hits in successive years, such as "Aquarius/Let the Sunshine In" and "Good Morning Starshine".

The Isle of Wight Festival in the UK saw the return of Bob Dylan to live performance after his motorbike accident in 1966.

US and UK pop music remained popular worldwide, with few European acts making the charts outside their home countries; exceptions included Jane Birkin & Serge Gainsbourg, Shocking Blue, Georges Moustaki, Aphrodite's Child and Christian Anders.

David Bowie's "Space Oddity" was released at the time that American astronauts first landed on the Moon. The song, the story of an astronaut named Major Tom who goes into space and is entranced by the beauty of seeing Earth from such a great distance and consequently lets himself float off into space, never again to return, was chosen by the BBC as background music for the television coverage of the Moon landing. The remainder of the album, Man of Words/Man of Music, was too eccentric for mainstream acceptance, though it established Bowie as a major performer and songwriter.

King Crimson's In the Court of the Crimson King, a pioneering album in the development of progressive rock, drew upon contemporary influences to form a sound melding rock and roll with classical influences in long pieces of music. Similar albums by The Moody Blues, Procol Harum and The Nice, as well as Genesis, Yes and Pink Floyd, were also released this year, expanding the range of prog rock and developing it into a full-fledged genre.

The Stooges' eponymous debut album released in the United States to little critical or popular acceptance, went on to become one of the most important recordings in the early development of punk rock, as did Kick Out The Jams by Detroit protopunkers MC5.

Johnny Cash's At San Quentin included his first Top Ten pop hit, "A Boy Named Sue". The album was a sequel to 1968's At Folsom Prison. Also in country music, Merle Haggard's Same Train, Different Time, a tribute to Jimmie Rodgers, was enormously popular and influenced the development of the Bakersfield sound into outlaw country within a few years.

Creedence Clearwater Revival cemented their success from the previous year. Having had a single US number 11 hit in 1968 with "Suzie Q", they releases their second, third and fourth proper studio albums in 1969, as well as drawing a total of four top 3 hits from these three albums. Starting with Bayou Country, including the US number 2 hit "Proud Mary", and continuing with Green River and finally Willy and the Poor Boys, which, during the year, transformed them from an up-and-coming underground act to bona fide rock stars. During 1969, Creedence Clearwater Revival had number 2 hits in the US with "Proud Mary", "Green River" and "Bad Moon Rising", and also have a number 3 hit with "Down on the Corner"/"Fortunate Son".

Gilberto Gil and Caetano Veloso released enormously popular albums in Brazil, Gilberto Gil and Caetano Veloso, respectively. The pair's fusion of bossa nova, samba and other native Brazilian folk influences, melded with politically and socially aware lyrics, kickstarted what came to be known as Tropicalia. Both musicians moved to London after a period of imprisonment for anti-government activities in Brazil.

The UK band Family released their second album, Family Entertainment, their first top 10 album in the United Kingdom, hitting number six, with "The Weaver's Answer" becoming their most popular song in their concert performances. By the end of the year, however, their first attempt to break through commercially in the United States had failed miserably.

Elvis Presley returned to live performances at the International Hotel in Las Vegas; breaking all attendance records in his 57-concert run. He also enjoyed great success with his singles "In the Ghetto" and "Suspicious Minds".

The Wendy Carlos album Switched-On Bach was one of the first classical albums to sell 500,000 copies, and helped bring classical music into the popular sphere, as did Mason Williams' "Classical Gas", played on classical guitar, in addition to being accompanied by one of the first successful music videos. The composition won three Grammy Awards: Best Instrumental Composition, Best Contemporary-Pop Performance, Instrumental, and Best Instrumental Arrangement. In the meantime, German trumpeter Manfred Schoof's free jazz album, European Echoes, a recording of his half-hour free improvisation broadcast on German radio in June 1969, featured international musicians and is regarded as a seminal album in the genre.

After the commercial failure of her last two albums, Cher starred in the film "Chastity" which had a soundtrack album produced by Sonny Bono. SHer 6th solo studio album, 3614 Jackson Highway, was also a commercial failure, but was where she first explored blues and soul music, being highly praised by critics for her musical and vocal evolution.

Chutney music was also first recorded in 1969, in Trinidad and Tobago by Sundar Popo.

1969 was the last year in which the United States government gave greater financial support, through the National Endowment for the Arts (NEA) "Music Program" to opera than it did to other classical music, and the first year in which it gave any support at all to jazz and folk music.

New York City Ballet celebrated their 25th anniversary with performances at the David H. Koch Theater Lincoln Center.

=== Major events ===
- January 4 – Guitarist Jimi Hendrix is accused of arrogance by British television producers after playing an impromptu version of "Sunshine of Your Love" past his allotted timeslot on the BBC1 show Happening for Lulu.
- January 12 – Led Zeppelin's eponymous debut album is released.
- January 18 – Pete Best wins his defamation lawsuit against The Beatles. Best had originally sought $8 million, but ends up being awarded much less.
- January 30 – The Beatles' rooftop concert: The Beatles perform for the last time in public, on the roof of the Apple building at 3 Savile Row, London. The performance, which is filmed for the Let It Be movie, is stopped early by police after neighbors complain about the noise.
- February 3
  - Eric Burdon & The Animals disband.
  - John Lennon, George Harrison and Ringo Starr hire Allen Klein as The Beatles' new business manager, against the wishes of Paul McCartney.
- February 4 – Paul McCartney hires the law firm of Eastman & Eastman, Linda Eastman's father's law firm, as general legal counsel for Apple Records.
- February 15 – Vickie Jones is arrested for impersonating Aretha Franklin in a concert performance. Jones' impersonation is so convincing that nobody in the audience asked for a refund.
- February 17 – Johnny Cash and Bob Dylan record together in Nashville, Tennessee. Only one song, "Girl from the North Country", would be released from these sessions.
- February 18 – Lulu and Maurice Gibb are married in the UK. Maurice's twin brother Robin Gibb is best man. Three thousand guests, most of them uninvited, turn out for the affair.
- February 24 – Johnny Cash performs "A Boy Named Sue" at California's San Quentin State Prison.
- March 1 – During a performance at Miami's Dinner Key Auditorium, Jim Morrison of the Doors is arrested for allegedly exposing himself during the show. Morrison is officially charged with lewd and lascivious behavior, indecent behavior, open profanity and public drunkenness.
- March 2 – John Lennon performs publicly outside The Beatles for the first time, with Yoko Ono at an improvised concert in Cambridge, England.
- March 7 – The Who release "Pinball Wizard" as a single with a B-Side of "Dogs (Part Two)."
- March 12
  - The 11th Grammy Awards are presented in Chicago, Los Angeles, Nashville and New York. Glen Campbell's By the Time I Get to Phoenix wins Album of the Year, Simon & Garfunkel's "Mrs. Robinson" wins Record of the Year and Roger Miller's "Little Green Apples", performed by Miller and O. C. Smith, wins Song of the Year. José Feliciano wins Best New Artist.
  - Paul McCartney marries Linda Eastman in London.
  - George Harrison and his wife Pattie are arrested in the UK on charges of hashish possession.
- March 15 – Judy Garland marries Mickey Deans in London.
- March 20 – John Lennon marries Yoko Ono in Gibraltar.
- March 25-31 – John Lennon and Yoko Ono host a "Bed-In" for peace in their room at the Amsterdam Hilton, turning their honeymoon into an antiwar event. Lennon also learns from a morning newspaper that publisher Dick James has sold his shares of Northern Songs to Lew Grade's Associated Television (ATV).
- March 26 – Lotti Golden records her debut LP Motor-Cycle (Atlantic SD 8223) at Atlantic Studios in New York City, featured in Newsweek (July 1969).
- March 29 – At the 14th annual Eurovision Song Contest held at the Teatro Real, Madrid, Spain, the final result is a four-way tie for first place between Spain ("Vivo cantando" – Salomé); United Kingdom ("Boom Bang-a-Bang" – Lulu); Netherlands ("De Troubadour" – Lenny Kuhr) and France ("Un jour, un enfant" – Frida Boccara). As there is no tie-break rule in force at this time, the four entries involved, who each scored 18 points, are declared ex-aequo winners.
- April 1 – The Beach Boys file a lawsuit against their record label, Capitol Records, for $2,041,446.64 in unpaid royalties and producer's fees for Brian Wilson. Capitol retaliates by deleting most of its Beach Boys catalog, severely limiting the band's income.
- April 8 – Opening for Ten Years After at the Fillmore East in New York City, Family perform their first U.S. concert, and the show is an unmitigated disaster. Vocalist Roger Chapman, on his 27th birthday, throws a microphone stand into the audience, unintentionally in the direction of Fillmore East impresario Bill Graham.
- April 20 – The L.A. Free Festival in Venice, California ends before it even starts, following a riot of audience members, 117 of which are arrested. None of the performers scheduled to play appear.
- April 22
  - The first complete performance of The Who's rock opera Tommy during a performance in Dolton, Devon, UK
  - A Garland for Dr. K., a celebratory collection in honour of the 80th birthday of Alfred Kalmus, consisting of eleven compositions by David Bedford, Harrison Birtwistle, Richard Rodney Bennett, Luciano Berio, Pierre Boulez, Cristóbal Halffter, Roman Haubenstock-Ramati, Henri Pousseur, Bernard Rands, Karlheinz Stockhausen, and Hugh Wood is performed at the Queen Elizabeth Hall in the Southbank Centre, London, on a programme that also featured the word premieres of Eight Songs for a Mad King by Peter Maxwell Davies and Linoi II by Birtwistle.
  - John Lennon changes his middle name from Winston to Ono.
- April 24 – The Beatles make a $5.1 million counter offer to the Northern Songs stockholders in an attempt to keep Associated TV from controlling the band's music.
- April 28 – Chicago releases its debut album, The Chicago Transit Authority.
- May – The Winstons release in the US the track "Amen Brother" as the B-side of R&B single "Color Him Father" from which drummer Gregory C. Coleman's 4-bar break, as the 'Amen break', becomes one of the most widely sampled tracks in history.
- May 3
  - Sly & the Family Stone release their breakthrough album, Stand!, which became one of the top-selling albums of the decade and made the band one of the most popular acts in rock and soul music.
  - Jimi Hendrix is arrested by Canadian Mounties at Toronto's International Airport for possession of narcotics (heroin). Hendrix is released on $10,000 bail.
- May 6 – In London, representatives of Warner Brothers-Seven Arts discuss the purchase of fifteen percent of The Beatles' Northern Songs.
- May 10 – The Turtles perform at the White House. Singer Mark Volman falls off the stage five times.
- May 16 – HPSCHD, an event conceived by John Cage and Lejaren Hiller as a highly immersive multimedia experience, received its premiere performance before an audience of 6000 at the Assembly Hall of the Urbana Campus, University of Illinois at Urbana–Champaign.
- May 23 – The Who release their rock opera Tommy.
- May 30–31 – First Annual Rock & Roll Revival in Detroit; Performers include among others MC5, Johnny Winter, Chuck Berry, Dr. John, Sun Ra, David Peel, The Stooges, Bonzo Dog Doo Dah Band .
- June 2 – John Lennon and Yoko Ono host a "Bed-In" at the Queen Elizabeth Hotel in Montreal, Quebec, Canada. The couple records the song "Give Peace a Chance" live in their suite with Tommy Smothers, Timothy Leary, and several others.
- June 7 – Blind Faith make their first live appearance with a free show In Hyde Park. Among the estimated 120,000 in attendance are Mick Jagger, Mick Fleetwood, Donovan, Chas Chandler, Noel Redding and Mitch Mitchell of the Jimi Hendrix Experience, Jim Capaldi and Chris Wood of Traffic, Terry Hicks of The Hollies, and Mike Hugg of Manfred Mann.
- June 13 – Mick Taylor joins the Rolling Stones.
- June 28 – The Stonewall riots erupt in New York City, marking the launch of the gay liberation movement.
- June 29–August 24 – Harlem Cultural Festival in New York City.
- June 29 – Bass player Noel Redding announces to the media that he has quit the Jimi Hendrix Experience, having effectively done so during the recording of Electric Ladyland.
- July 1 – Cornelius Cardew's Scratch Orchestra holds its first meeting. Brian Eno begins his musical career as a member.
- July 3 – Brian Jones is found dead in the swimming pool at his home in Sussex, England, almost a month after leaving The Rolling Stones.
- July 5 – The Rolling Stones proceed with a free concert in Hyde Park, London, as a tribute to Brian Jones; it is also the band's first concert with guitarist Mick Taylor. Estimates of the audience range from 250,000 to 400,000.
- July 30 – Columbia records releases In A Silent Way by Miles Davis, one of the first jazz/rock fusion albums, featuring John McLaughlin, Joe Zawinul, and Chick Corea.
- July 31 – Elvis Presley returns to live performances in Las Vegas. The engagement ends on August 28.
- August 8 – Iain Macmillan photographs the cover picture for The Beatles' album Abbey Road at a north London zebra crossing near the Abbey Road Studios.
- August 9 – Members of would-be folk singer Charles Manson's "family" murder film star Sharon Tate and others, in Tate's home.
- August 15-17 – The Woodstock Music and Art Festival is held at Max Yasgur's dairy farm in Bethel, New York, near Woodstock. Performers include Jimi Hendrix, Janis Joplin, The Who, The Band, Joan Baez, Crosby, Stills, Nash & Young, Jefferson Airplane, Santana, Country Joe and the Fish, Ten Years After, and Sly & the Family Stone.
- August 20 – Final session for The Beatles' album Abbey Road at Abbey Road Studios in London, the last time all four members of the band are present in a studio together.
- August 21-24 – The Jazz Bilzen Festival is held in Bilzen, Belgium. Performers include Deep Purple, Shocking Blue, The Moody Blues, Soft Machine, Bonzo Dog Doo Dah Band, The Move and Blossom Toes.
- August 30-31 – The Isle of Wight Festival is held in Wootton Bridge. Performers include among others The Band, Blodwyn Pig, Edgar Broughton Band, Joe Cocker, Bonzo Dog Doo Dah Band, Bob Dylan (returning to live music after his motorbike accident in 1966), Family, The Who, Free, Mighty Baby, The Moody Blues, The Nice, The Pretty Things, Third Ear Band.
- September 11 – Janis Joplin releases I Got Dem Ol' Kozmic Blues Again Mama! her first solo album since leaving the group Big Brother and the Holding Company.
- September 13 – John Lennon and Plastic Ono Band perform at the Toronto Rock and Roll Revival 12-hour music festival, backed by Eric Clapton, Klaus Voormann and Alan White. Other performers on the bill include Chuck Berry, Bo Diddley, Little Richard, Jerry Lee Lewis and up-and-comers Chicago. It is Lennon's first-ever large-scale public rock performance (noting his lower-profile 1968 appearance in the Dirty Mac) without one or more of The Beatles since meeting Paul McCartney in 1957. He decides before returning to the UK to leave The Beatles permanently. During the show, a chicken is somehow in a feather pillow that Alice Cooper normally uses as a stage routine during his band's performance. Cooper, thinking that all birds fly, throws the chicken into the audience and fans tear the chicken and throw it back on stage. The event would be known as "The Chicken Incident" and Cooper develops his reputation as a shock-rocker.
- September 24 – Deep Purple and the Royal Philharmonic Orchestra perform the Concerto for Group and Orchestra at the Royal Albert Hall in London, in the first elaborate collaboration between a rock band and an orchestra.
- October 14 – The final single by Diana Ross & The Supremes, "Someday We'll Be Together", is released. The single, although credited to Diana Ross & the Supremes, was actually sung by Ross with session singers "the Andantes", instead of the other two Supremes. Nonetheless, it becomes the final number 1 hit of 1969 (and of the 1960s). After a farewell concert in January 1970, Diana Ross leaves the Supremes for a solo career.
- October 18 – Bonzo Dog Doo Dah Band Live at the Fillmore East, NY.
- October 22 – Led Zeppelin's second album is released with the song "Whole Lotta Love".
- October 30 – Richard Nader's first Rock and Roll Revival concert sells out, setting the stage for oldies as a commercial category.
- November – Simon & Garfunkel give a live concert at Iowa State University, where they record the track "Bye, Bye Love" for their upcoming album Bridge Over Troubled Water.
- November 1 – After seven years off the top of the charts, Elvis Presley hits No. 1 on the Billboard chart with "Suspicious Minds".
- November 7 – The Rolling Stones open their US tour in Fort Collins, Colorado.
- November 8 – Simon & Garfunkel, on tour for the first time with a band, give a live concert in Carbondale, Illinois, presumably at Southern Illinois University. The concert is not released until 1999 as part of a recording compiled by Head Records, called Village Vanguard.
- November 11 – Simon & Garfunkel give a live concert at Miami University in Oxford, Ohio. The recording is later released in the 1990s as Back to College on Yellow Dog Records and A Time of Innocence on Bell Bottom Records.
- November 15
  - 500,000 people march in Washington, D.C. for peace, which becomes the largest anti-war rally in U.S. history. Performing on stage: Arlo Guthrie, Pete Seeger, Peter, Paul and Mary, Richie Havens, Earl Scuggs, John Denver, Mitch Miller, touring cast of Hair
  - Musik für die Beethovenhalle in Bonn, a multi-auditorium retrospective concert of the music of Karlheinz Stockhausen, with the world premiere of his Fresco presented in four different foyer spaces continuously over a span of four-and-a-half hours.
- November 29 – Billboard magazine changes its policy of charting the A and B sides of 45 singles on its pop chart. The former policy charted the two sides separately, but the new policy considers both sides as one chart entry. The Beatles are the first beneficiary of the new policy as their current 45 single featuring "Come Together" on one side, and "Something" on the other, accrue enough combined points to make the single a #1 pop hit. Similarly, Creedence Clearwater Revival's "Fortunate Son" and "Down On The Corner" accrue enough combined points to reach number 3 three weeks later.
- November 30 – Simon & Garfunkel air TV special Songs of America, ostensibly an hour-long show that is anti-war and anti-poverty featuring live footage from their 1969 tour.
- December 6
  - The Jackson 5 release their debut album, Diana Ross Presents The Jackson 5.
  - Altamont Free Concert
  - Zubin Mehta marries Nancy Kovack.
- December 13 - the final episode of The Banana Splits Adventure Hour airs on NBC as the network cancels the program during a telecast of Rudolph the red nosed reindeer a week later.

== Bands formed ==
- See Musical groups established in 1969

== Bands disbanded ==
- The 13th Floor Elevators
- Eric Burdon and the Animals (original Animals reform in 1975)
- The Jeff Beck Group (reassembled with different line-up in 1971)

== Albums released ==
=== January ===
Day	Album	Artist	Notes
6	The Holy Land	Johnny Cash	-
13	Yellow Submarine	The Beatles	Soundtrack
15	Bayou Country	Creedence Clearwater Revival	
17	Babylon	Dr. John	-
17	Ball	Iron Butterfly	-
17	Soul '69	Aretha Franklin	-
20	Led Zeppelin	Led Zeppelin	US/Debut
30	Moby Grape '69	Moby Grape	-
–	Birthday Blues	Bert Jansch	-
–	Donovan's Greatest Hits	Donovan	Compilation
–	First Edition '69	The First Edition	-
–	Irresistible	Tammi Terrell	Solo debut
–	Till	The Vogues	-
–	What We Did on Our Holidays	Fairport Convention	-
–	The Live Adventures of Mike Bloomfield and Al Kooper	Mike Bloomfield & Al Kooper	-

=== February ===
Day	Album	Artist	Notes
2	Perspective	Rick Nelson	
5	Filles de Kilimanjaro	Miles Davis	-
5	Goodbye	Cream	-
6	The Gilded Palace of Sin	The Flying Burrito Brothers	Debut
10	20/20	The Beach Boys	-
11	Sound of Sexy Soul	The Delfonics	-
15	Instant Replay	The Monkees	-
17	Cloud Nine	The Temptations	-
21	Postcard	Mary Hopkin	Debut
-	Bless Its Pointed Little Head	Jefferson Airplane	Live
-	Stonedhenge	Ten Years After	-
-	Kick Out the Jams	MC5	Live, Debut
-	O.K. Ken?	Chicken Shack	-
-	Mutantes	Os Mutantes	-
-	My Own Peculiar Way	Willie Nelson	-
-	Odessa	Bee Gees	-
-	Near the Beginning	Vanilla Fudge	-
-	Contact	Silver Apples	-

=== March ===
Day	Album	Artist	Notes
5	Dr. Byrds & Mr. Hyde	The Byrds	-
14	Tons of Sobs	Free	Debut
17	Freedom Suite	The Rascals	-
17	Galveston	Glen Campbell	-
21	Bull of the Woods	The 13th Floor Elevators	-
21	Scott 3	Scott Walker	-
24	Mothermania	The Mothers of Invention	Compilation
28	From Genesis to Revelation	Genesis	Debut
31	Dusty in Memphis	Dusty Springfield	-
–	At Your Birthday Party	Steppenwolf	-
–	Those Who Are About to Die Salute You	Colosseum	Debut
–	Family Entertainment	Family	-
–	Happy Trails	Quicksilver Messenger Service	-
–	Yer' Album	James Gang	Debut
–	Just to Satisfy You	Waylon Jennings	-
–	My Way	Frank Sinatra	-
–	New! Improved!	Blue Cheer	-
–	Outta Season	Ike & Tina Turner	-
–	Say It Loud, I'm Black and I'm Proud	James Brown	-
–	Spooky Two	Spooky Tooth	-
–	The Velvet Underground	The Velvet Underground	Third Album
–	Wheatfield Soul	The Guess Who	-

=== April ===
Day	Album	Artist	Notes
4	Brother Love's Traveling Salvation Show	Neil Diamond	-
7	Nazz Nazz	Nazz	-
7	Songs from a Room	Leonard Cohen	-
8	Three Week Hero	P.J. Proby	-
9	Nashville Skyline	Bob Dylan	-
15	Green Is Blues	Al Green	-
15	Johnny Winter	Johnny Winter	-
21	Uncle Meat	The Mothers of Invention	Soundtrack
23	With a Little Help from My Friends	Joe Cocker	Debut
25	On the Threshold of a Dream	The Moody Blues	-
26	Ramblin' Gamblin' Man	The Bob Seger System	Debut
28	The Chicago Transit Authority	Chicago	Debut
30	M.P.G.	Marvin Gaye	-
-	Taste	Taste	Debut
-	Blue Matter	Savoy Brown	-
-	Hair	Various Artists	London cast
-	It's Our Thing	The Isley Brothers	-
-	Joyride	Friendsound	-
-	Our Mother the Mountain	Townes Van Zandt	-
-	Elephant Mountain	The Youngbloods	-
-	Soft and Beautiful	Aretha Franklin	-
-	Soulful	Dionne Warwick	-

=== May ===
Day	Album	Artist	Notes
1	Clouds	Joni Mitchell	-
9	Beginnings	Ambrose Slade	Debut
9	Electronic Sound	George Harrison	-
9	Unfinished Music No. 2: Life with the Lions	John Lennon & Yoko Ono	-
12	After the Rain	Muddy Waters	-
14	Everybody Knows This Is Nowhere	Neil Young & Crazy Horse	-
16	Rehearsals for Retirement	Phil Ochs	-
16	Unicorn	Tyrannosaurus Rex	-
19	Tommy	The Who	
19	Pickin' Up the Pieces	Poco	Debut
19	Oar	Skip Spence	-
19	More Today Than Yesterday	Spiral Starecase	-
23	Surround Yourself with Cilla	Cilla Black	-
26	Let the Sunshine In	Diana Ross & the Supremes	-
29	Crosby, Stills & Nash	Crosby, Stills & Nash	Debut
–	Stand!	Sly & the Family Stone	-
–	A Black Man's Soul	Ike Turner & The Kings of Rhythm	-
–	The Age of Aquarius	The 5th Dimension	-
–	The Booker T. Set	Booker T. & the M.G.'s	-
–	California Bloodlines	John Stewart	-
–	David's Album	Joan Baez	-
–	Gettin' Down to It	James Brown	-
–	Hollies Sing Dylan	The Hollies	-
–	Home	Delaney & Bonnie	Debut
–	Last Exit	Traffic	-
–	The Meters	The Meters	Debut
–	Motor-Cycle	Lotti Golden	-
–	This Is Tom Jones	Tom Jones	-
–	The Young Mods' Forgotten Story	The Impressions	-

=== June ===
Day	Album	Artist	Notes
2	From Elvis in Memphis	Elvis Presley	
2	Early Days	The Zombies	Compilation
5	Folkjokeopus	Roy Harper	-
6	Empty Sky	Elton John	Debut
11	Suitable for Framing	Three Dog Night	-
13	More	Pink Floyd	Soundtrack
16	Brave New World	Steve Miller Band	-
16	At San Quentin	Johnny Cash	Live
16	Trout Mask Replica	Captain Beefheart	-
20	3614 Jackson Highway	Cher	-
20	Aoxomoxoa	Grateful Dead	-
20	Chastity	Cher	Soundtrack
20	First Take	Roberta Flack	Debut
20	Love Man	Otis Redding	-
25	Pretties for You	Alice Cooper	Debut
30	Always, Always	Porter Wagoner and Dolly Parton	-
–	Beck-Ola	The Jeff Beck Group	-
–	Where Is Brooklyn?	Don Cherry	Feat. Pharoah Sanders & Ed Blackwell
–	Best of Bee Gees	Bee Gees	Compilation
–	Bubblegum, Lemonade, and... Something for Mama	Cass Elliot	-
–	Concerto in B. Goode	Chuck Berry	-
–	Deep Purple	Deep Purple	US; third album
–	An Electric Storm	White Noise	Debut
–	Feliciano/10 to 23	José Feliciano	-
–	Here We Are Again	Country Joe and the Fish	-
–	In Person	Ike & Tina Turner and The Ikettes	Live
–	It's a Beautiful Day	It's A Beautiful Day	Debut
–	Jane Birkin/Serge Gainsbourg	Jane Birkin and Serge Gainsbourg	-
–	Just Good Old Rock and Roll	The Electric Prunes	-
–	Lee Michaels	Lee Michaels	-
–	Pongo en tus manos abiertas	Víctor Jara	-
–	A Salty Dog	Procol Harum	-

=== July ===
Day	Album	Artist	Notes
1	Boy Named Sue	Shel Silverstein	
4	Maybe Tomorrow	The Iveys	Debut
8	Hallelujah	Canned Heat	-
10	Happy Sad	Tim Buckley	-
18	The Soft Parade	The Doors	-
25	Stand Up	Jethro Tull	-
25	Yes	Yes	Debut
25	Ahead Rings Out	Blodwyn Pig	Debut
29	Preflyte	The Byrds	Compilation
30	In a Silent Way	Miles Davis	-
30	Truly Fine Citizen	Moby Grape	-
-	Five Leaves Left	Nick Drake	Debut
-	Unhalfbricking	Fairport Convention	-
-	2525 (Exordium and Terminus)	Zager and Evans	Debut
-	Alias Pink Puzz	Paul Revere & the Raiders	-
-	Early Steppenwolf	Steppenwolf	Live 1967
-	If Only for a Moment	Blossom Toes	-
-	More of Old Golden Throat	Johnny Cash	Compilation
-	Mountain	Leslie West	Debut
-	The Original Delaney & Bonnie & Friends	Delaney & Bonnie	-
-	Wasa Wasa	Edgar Broughton Band	Debut
-	What About Today?	Barbra Streisand	-

=== August ===
Day	Album	Artist	Notes
1	As Safe as Yesterday Is	Humble Pie	Debut
1	Tadpoles	Bonzo Dog Doo-Dah Band	Released on June 9 in US
5	The Stooges	The Stooges	Debut
7	Green River	Creedence Clearwater Revival	
9	Blind Faith	Blind Faith	Debut
11	Barabajagal	Donovan	-
14	The Brothers: Isley	The Isley Brothers	-
15	Mourning in the Morning	Otis Rush	-
18	Fathers and Sons	Muddy Waters	-
22	Santana	Santana	Debut
25	On Time	Grand Funk Railroad	Debut
27	Boz Scaggs	Boz Scaggs	-
29	My Cherie Amour	Stevie Wonder	-
29	Songs for a Tailor	Jack Bruce	Solo debut
-	The Association	The Association	-
-	Four Sail	Love	-
-	Give It Away	The Chi-Lites	-
-	The Head Shop	The Head Shop	-
-	Harry	Harry Nilsson	-
-	It's a Mother	James Brown	-
-	Monster Movie	Can	Debut
-	Nice	The Nice	Third album
-	The Popcorn	James Brown	-
-	Ssssh	Ten Years After	-

=== September ===
Day	Album	Artist	Notes
11	I Got Dem Ol' Kozmic Blues Again Mama!	Janis Joplin	Solo debut
12	Through the Past, Darkly (Big Hits Vol. 2)	The Rolling Stones	Compilation
16	Easy	Marvin Gaye and Tammi Terrell	-
19	Then Play On	Fleetwood Mac	-
22	The Band	The Band	-
23	Hot Buttered Soul	Isaac Hayes	-
23	Puzzle People	The Temptations	-
23	Together	Diana Ross & the Supremes and The Temptations	Duets
24	New York Tendaberry	Laura Nyro	-
26	Abbey Road	The Beatles	-
30	At Home	Shocking Blue	-
30	Get Ready	Rare Earth	-
-	2 Ozs of Plastic with a Hole in the Middle	Man	-
-	Canned Wheat	The Guess Who	-
-	Love Chronicles	Al Stewart	-
-	Noah	The Bob Seger System	-
-	Rock & Roll	Vanilla Fudge	-
-	The Aerosol Grey Machine	Van der Graaf Generator	Debut
-	Spare Parts	Status Quo	-
-	A Step Further	Savoy Brown	Live + studio
-	Supersnazz	The Flamin' Groovies	Debut
-	These Things Too	Pearls Before Swine	-
-	Townes Van Zandt	Townes Van Zandt	-
-	Volume Two	The Soft Machine	-

=== October ===
Day	Album	Artist	Notes
1	Juicy Lucy	Juicy Lucy	Debut
1	The Monkees Present	The Monkees	-
6	Get Together with Andy Williams	Andy Williams	-
9	Ticket to Ride	Carpenters	Previously titled as Offering. Debut
10	Arthur (Or the Decline and Fall of the British Empire)	The Kinks	-
10	Hot Rats	Frank Zappa	-
10	In the Court of the Crimson King	King Crimson	Debut
13	Give Me Your Love for Christmas	Johnny Mathis	Christmas
14	Elvis in Person at the International Hotel, Las Vegas, Nevada	Elvis Presley	Live
14	Rhymes and Reasons	John Denver	Debut
16	Captured Live at the Forum	Three Dog Night	Live
20	Wedding Album	John Lennon and Yoko Ono	-
22	Led Zeppelin II	Led Zeppelin	-
27	Second Winter	Johnny Winter	-
29	Willy and the Poor Boys	Creedence Clearwater Revival	
31	The Power Of The Picts	Writing on the Wall	Heavy Prog band from Scotland
–	100 Ton Chicken	Chicken Shack	-
–	Live at Yankee Stadium	The Isley Brothers	Live
–	Basket of Light	Pentangle	-
–	Affectionately Melanie	Melanie Safka	-
–	The Battle of North West Six	Keef Hartley	-
–	Keep On Moving	The Butterfield Blues Band	-
–	Clear	Spirit	-
–	The Deviants 3	The Deviants	-
–	Free	Free	-
–	The Hunter	Ike & Tina Turner	–
–	Tom Jones Live in Las Vegas	Tom Jones	Live
–	Turtle Soup	The Turtles	-

=== November ===
Day	Album	Artist	Notes
3	Cream of the Crop	Diana Ross & the Supremes	-
3	Four in Blue	The Miracles	-
4	The Allman Brothers Band	The Allman Brothers Band	Debut
7	Manfred Mann Chapter Three	Manfred Mann Chapter Three	-
7	Scott 4	Scott Walker	-
7	Ummagumma	Pink Floyd	Double LP; live + studio
7	Valentyne Suite	Colosseum	-
10	Ballad of Easy Rider	The Byrds	-
10	Live/Dead	Grateful Dead	Double LP; live
14	David Bowie	David Bowie	Re-titled Space Oddity
14	The Autumn Stone	Small Faces	compilation
14	Touching You, Touching Me	Neil Diamond	-
17	Eight Miles High	Golden Earring	-
21	To Our Children's Children's Children	The Moody Blues	-
22	Mott the Hoople	Mott the Hoople	Debut
24	Blue Afternoon	Tim Buckley	-
27	It's Five O'Clock	Aphrodite's Child	-
28	Let It Bleed	The Rolling Stones	-
29	Almendra	Almendra	-
-	Alive Alive-O!	José Feliciano	-
-	Changing Horses	The Incredible String Band	-
-	Hollies Sing Hollies	The Hollies	-
-	Joe Cocker!	Joe Cocker	-
-	Jorge Ben	Jorge Ben	-
-	Joy of a Toy	Kevin Ayers	Solo debut
-	Keynsham	Bonzo Dog Band	-
-	Monster	Steppenwolf	-
-	The Rod Stewart Album	Rod Stewart	US; released Feb. 13, 1970, in UK as An Old Raincoat Won't Ever Let You Down; solo debut
-	Rock Salt & Nails	Steve Young	-
-	The Spice of Life (Marlena Shaw album)	Marlena Shaw	-
-	Town and Country	Humble Pie	-
-	Volunteers	Jefferson Airplane	-
-	A Way of Life	The Family Dogg	Debut
-	Your Saving Grace	Steve Miller Band	-

=== December ===
Day	Album	Artist	Notes
5	Completely Well	B.B. King	-
12	Live Peace in Toronto 1969	Plastic Ono Band	Live
18	Diana Ross Presents The Jackson 5	The Jackson 5	Debut
29	Grand Funk	Grand Funk Railroad	-
29	Okie from Muskogee	Merle Haggard and the Strangers	-
31	Out Here	Love	-
-	Concerto for Group and Orchestra	Deep Purple & the Royal Philharmonic Orchestra	Live
-	Hard 'n' Horny	Wigwam	Debut
-	6- and 12-String Guitar	Leo Kottke	Debut
-	Blue Cheer	Blue Cheer	-
-	Ceremony	Spooky Tooth and Pierre Henry	-
-	Liege & Lief	Fairport Convention	-
-	Fancy Free	Donald Byrd	-
-	Renaissance	Renaissance	

=== Release date unknown ===
- '69 – The First Edition
- 2 Bugs and a Roach – Earl Hooker
- 25 Miles – Edwin Starr
- Adiós Nonino – Astor Piazzolla
- Albert's House - Chet Baker
- Alias Pink Puzz - Paul Revere & the Raiders
- Alive - Nitty Gritty Dirt Band
- Alma-Ville - Vince Guaraldi
- The American Metaphysical Circus – Joseph Byrd
- Anthems in Eden – Shirley and Dolly Collins with the Early Music Consort of London directed by David Munrow
- Another Voyage - Ramsey Lewis
- Appleknockers Flophouse - Cuby + Blizzards
- At Home with The Dubliners – The Dubliners
- At Home with Lynn - Lynn Anderson
- Atlantis - Sun Ra
- Baby I Love You – Andy Kim
- Back in Baby's Arms - Connie Smith
- Blues Creation - Blues Creation
- The Belle of Avenue A – The Fugs
- The Best of Tommy James and The Shondells – Tommy James and the Shondells
- The Biggest Thing Since Colossus - Otis Spann
- Birthday – The Peddlers
- Black Gipsy - Archie Shepp
- A Black Man's Soul - Ike Turner
- Black Rhythm Happening - Eddie Gale
- The Blue Potato and Other Outrages... - Ran Blake
- Blues Obituary – The Groundhogs
- The Blues and Other Colors - James Moody
- Blues for We - Mel Brown
- The Blues; That's Me! - Illinois Jacquet
- The Boss Is Back! - Gene Ammons
- Both Sides of People – People!
- Breathe Awhile – Arcadium
- Butch Cassidy and the Sundance Kid – Burt Bacharach – Soundtrack
- Caetano Veloso – Caetano Veloso
- Canta in Italiano – Dalida
- The Charlatans – The Charlatans (debut)
- The Chipmunks Go to the Movies - Alvin and the Chipmunks
- The Climax Chicago Blues Band – Climax Blues Band
- Cold Blood – Cold Blood
- Country Folk – Waylon Jennings
- Dizzy – Tommy Roe
- Doctor Dunbar's Prescription – The Aynsley Dunbar Retaliation
- Doing His Thing – Ray Charles
- Driftin' Way of Life – Jerry Jeff Walker
- A Drop of The Dubliners – The Dubliners
- Edwards Hand – Edwards Hand
- Ella – Ella Fitzgerald
- Engelbert – Engelbert Humperdinck
- Engelbert Humperdinck – Engelbert Humperdinck
- Everyday I Have the Blues – T-Bone Walker
- The Fabulous Charlie Rich – Charlie Rich
- First Winter – Johnny Winter
- Featuring: I Can't Quit Her – The Letter – The Arbors
- The Flock – The Flock
- For Children of All Ages – The Peanut Butter Conspiracy
- Galveston – The Lawrence Welk Orchestra
- A Gathering of Promises – Bubble Puppy
- Giant Step/De Ole Folks at Home - Taj Mahal
- Gilberto Gil – Gilberto Gil
- Good Morning Starshine – Oliver
- The Good Rats – The Good Rats (debut)
- Grand Canyon Suite – Johnny Cash
- The Great American Eagle Tragedy – Earth Opera
- The Greatest Little Soul Band in the Land – J.J. Jackson
- A Group Called Smith – Smith
- Hand Me Down My Old Walking Stick – Big Joe Williams
- Hank Marvin – Hank Marvin (debut solo)
- Happy Heart – Andy Williams
- The House of Blue Lights – Don Covay
- The Howlin' Wolf Album – Howlin' Wolf
- I Do Not Play No Rock 'n' Roll – Mississippi Fred McDowell
- I'm All Yours-Baby! – Ray Charles
- The Instrumental Sounds of Merle Haggard's Strangers – Merle Haggard & the Strangers
- Introducing the Jaggerz – the Jaggerz
- I Say a Little Prayer – Aretha Franklin - Compilation
- Is This What You Want? – Jackie Lomax
- It's The Dubliners – The Dubliners
- It's Not Killing Me – Mike Bloomfield
- Jackson – Johnny Cash
- Jewels of Thought – Pharoah Sanders
- Jimmy Cliff – Jimmy Cliff
- Joe South's Greatest Hits Vol.1 – Joe South
- Johnny Cash – Johnny Cash
- John Hartford - John Hartford
- Live & Well – B.B. King
- Live at the Albert Hall – The Dubliners
- Live at the Inferno (rec. 1967) – Raven
- Love Is All We Have to Give – Checkmates, Ltd.
- Ma mère me disait – Dalida
- A Man Alone – Frank Sinatra
- Moondog – Moondog
- Music Is the Healing Force of the Universe – Albert Ayler
- My Brother the Wind, Vol. 1 – Sun Ra
- My Brother the Wind, Vol. 2 – Sun Ra
- A Natural Woman – Peggy Lee
- O.C. Smith at Home – O. C. Smith
- The Open Mind – The Open Mind
- Ornette at 12 – Ornette Coleman
- Orgasm – Cromagnon
- Over and Over – Nana Mouskouri
- Pacific Gas and Electric – Pacific Gas & Electric
- People in Sorrow – Art Ensemble of Chicago
- Phallus Dei – Amon Düül II
- Photographs – Patrick Sky
- Rainbow Ride – Andy Kim
- Raven – Raven
- Roger Miller - Roger Miller
- Roger Miller featuring Dang Me! - Roger Miller
- Ruby Don't Take Your Love To Town – Kenny Rogers and The First Edition
- Same Train, a Different Time – Merle Haggard & the Strangers
- Sea Shanties – High Tide
- Seattle – Perry Como
- The Second Brooklyn Bridge – The Brooklyn Bridge
- Selflessness: Featuring My Favorite Things – John Coltrane
- The Simon Sisters Sing the Lobster Quadrille and Other Songs for Children – The Simon Sisters
- Soul Shakedown – Bob Marley & The Wailers (debut)
- Spirit in the Sky – Norman Greenbaum
- Sunshine of Your Love – Ella Fitzgerald
- Take a Message to Mary – Don Cherry
- Terry Reid – Terry Reid
- The Belle of Avenue A – The Fugs
- Thesaurus – Clare Fischer
- This Is Desmond Dekkar – Desmond Dekker
- Thunder On A Clear Day – Twentieth Century Zoo
- Touching You, Touching Me – Neil Diamond
- To Love Somebody - Nina Simone
- Trogglomania – The Troggs
- The Turning Point – John Mayall
- U.F.O. – Jim Sullivan
- Venus in Cancer – Robbie Basho
- Walking in Space – Quincy Jones
- Wanted Dead or Alive – Warren Zevon
- Waylon Jennings – Waylon Jennings
- What About? – Andrew Cyrille
- Wonder Where I'm Bound – Dion DiMucci
- Yummy Yummy Yummy – Julie London

== Billboard Top popular records of 1969 ==
from Billboard December 27, 1969

TOP RECORDS OF 1969 (Based on Billboard Charts) The information compiled for the Top Records of 1969 was based on the weekly chart positioning and length of time records were on the respective charts from the Billboard issue dates of January 4, 1969, through December 13, 1969. These recaps, as well as the weekly charts, do not reflect actual sales figures. The ratings take into account the number of weeks the disk was on the chart, plus the weekly positions it held during its chart life. Each disk was given points accordingly for its respective chart. These recaps were compiled by the staff of the Billboard Popularity Charts Department, under the direction of Andy Tomko. NOTE: Since the singles charts listed the most popular single sides and not the single record (with both sides) for the first 47 weeks of the year, the recaps list single sides in order of strength. In the case of a two-sided hit single, both sides were listed in the recaps based on the individual strength on the weekly chart.

The 1969 Billboard year-end list is composed of records that entered the Billboard Hot 100 during November–December 1968 (only when the majority of chart weeks were in 1969), January to November–December 1969 (majority of chart weeks in 1969). Records with majority of chart weeks in 1968 or 1970 are included in the year-end charts for those years, respectively, and multiple appearances are not permitted. Each week thirty points were awarded to the number one record, then nineteen points for number two, eighteen points for number three, and so on. The total points a record earned determined its year-end rank. The complete chart life of each record is represented. There are no ties, even when multiple records have the same number of points. The next ranking category is peak chart position, then weeks at peak chart position, weeks in top ten, weeks in top forty, and finally weeks on Hot 100 chart.

The chart can be sorted by Artist, Song title, Recording and Release dates, Cashbox year-end ranking (CB) or units sold (sales) by clicking on the column header. Additional details for each record can be accessed by clicking on the song title, and referring to the Infobox in the right column of the song page. Billboard also has chart summaries on its website. Cashbox rankings were derived by same process as the Billboard rankings. Sales information was derived from the RIAA's Gold and Platinum database, the BRIT Certified database and The Book of Golden Discs, but numbers listed should be regarded as estimates. Grammy Hall of Fame and National Recording Registry information with sources can be found on Wikipedia.

Rank	Artist	Title	Label	Recorded	Release date	CB	Sales	Charts, Awards
1	The 5th Dimension	"Aquarius/Let The Sunshine In (The Flesh Failures)"	Soul City 772	December 1968	March 1, 1969	1	8.00	US Billboard 1969 #1, Hot100 #1 for 6 weeks, 17 total weeks, 284 points, Grammy Hall of Fame 2004
2	The Archies	"Sugar, Sugar"	Calendar 63-1008	April 1969	May 24, 1969	2	6.00	US Billboard 1969 #2, Hot100 #1 for 4 weeks, 22 total weeks, 270 points
3	The Rolling Stones	"Honky Tonk Women"	London 910	June 12, 1969	July 11, 1969	3	1.00	US Billboard 1969 #3, Hot100 #1 for 4 weeks, 15 total weeks, 242 points, Grammy Hall of Fame 2014
4	The Beatles with Billy Preston	"Get Back"	Apple 2490	January 28, 1969	May 5, 1969	4	8.00	Top Rock Tracks 1969 #3, US Billboard 1969 #4, Hot100 #1 for 5 weeks, 12 total weeks, 226 points
5	Zager and Evans	"In The Year 2525 (Exordium & Terminus)"	RCA Victor 74-0174	March 1969	April 1969	5	8.00	US Billboard 1969 #5, Hot100 #1 for 6 weeks, 13 total weeks, 224 points
6	Sly and the Family Stone	"Everyday People"	Epic 10407	September 1968	November 1, 1968	7	1.25	US Billboard 1969 #6, Hot100 #1 for 4 weeks, 19 total weeks, 218 points
7	Tommy James and the Shondells	"Crimson And Clover"	Roulette 7028	November 1968	December 1968	14	1.00	US Billboard 1969 #7, Hot100 #1 for 2 weeks, 16 total weeks, 216 points
8	Tommy Roe	"Dizzy"	ABC 11164	October 1968	November 13, 1968	9	1.00	US Billboard 1969 #8, Hot100 #1 for 4 weeks, 15 total weeks, 204 points
9	The Temptations	"I Can't Get Next To You"	Gordy 7093	July 3, 1969	July 30, 1969	19	1.25	US Billboard 1969 #9, Hot100 #1 for 2 week, 17 total weeks, 204 points, Top Soul Singles 1969 #1, Hot Soul Singles #1 for 5 weeks, 15 total weeks, 288 points
10	Peter, Paul and Mary	"Leaving on a Jet Plane"	Warner Bros. 7340	December 1966	September 18, 1969	13	1.00	US Billboard 1969 #10, Hot100 #1 for 1 week, 17 total weeks, 197 points, Top Easy Listening Singles 1969 #5, Easy Listening Singles #1 for 3 weeks, 16 total weeks, 212 points, Grammy Hall of Fame 1998
11	The 5th Dimension	"Wedding Bell Blues"	Soul City 779	December 1968	September 1969	6	8.00	US Billboard 1969 #11, Hot100 #1 for 3 weeks, 15 total weeks, 193 points
12	The Beatles	"Come Together"	Apple 2654	July 30, 1969	October 6, 1969	10	8.00	Top Rock Tracks 1969 #7, US Billboard 1969 #12, Hot100 #1 for 1 week, 16 total weeks, 186 points
13	Diana Ross and the Supremes	"Someday We'll Be Together"	Motown 1156	June 13, 1969	October 14, 1969	12	2.00	US Billboard 1969 #13, Hot100 #1 for 1 week, 16 total weeks, 181 points, Top Soul Singles 1969 #3, Hot Soul Singles #1 for 4 weeks, 15 total weeks, 254 points
14	The Beatles	"Something"	Apple 2654	August 1969	October 6, 1969	26	8.00	US Billboard 1969 #14, Hot100 #1 for 1 week, 16 total weeks, 177 points
15	Steam	"Na Na Hey Hey Kiss Him Goodbye"	Fontana 1667	July 1969	August 1969	31	1.00	US Billboard 1969 #15, Hot100 #1 for 2 weeks, 16 total weeks, 170 points
16	Henry Mancini, His Orchestra And Chorus	"Love Theme from Romeo and Juliet"	Uni 55066	February 1969	March 1969	17	1.00	US Billboard 1969 #16, Hot100 #1 for 2 weeks, 14 total weeks, 168 points
17	The Cowsills	"Hair"	MGM 13810	January 1969	February 1969	8	1.00	US Billboard 1969 #17, Hot100 #2 for 2 weeks, 15 total weeks, 158 points
18	Tommy James and the Shondells	"Crystal Blue Persuasion"	Atlantic 2537	November 1968	May 1969	35	1.00	US Billboard 1969 #18, Hot100 #2 for 3 weeks, 15 total weeks, 157 points
19	Creedence Clearwater Revival	"Proud Mary"	Fantasy 619	October 1968	December 28, 1968	36	1.25	Top Rock Tracks 1969 #4, US Billboard 1969 #19, Hot100 #2 for 3 weeks, 14 total weeks, 149 points, Grammy Hall of Fame 1998
20	The Foundations	"Build Me Up Buttercup"	Uni 55101	April 1968	December 3, 1968	11	1.00	US Billboard 1969 #20, Hot100 #3 for 3 weeks, 15 total weeks, 148 points
21	Elvis Presley	"Suspicious Minds"	RCA Victor 47-9764	January 22, 1969	August 26, 1969	15	1.00	US Billboard 1969 #21, Hot100 #1 for 1 week, 15 total weeks, 144 points, Grammy Hall of Fame 1999
22	Sly and the Family Stone	"Hot Fun in the Summertime"	Epic 10555	May 1969	July 21, 1969	68	1.25	US Billboard 1969 #22, Hot100 #2 for 2 weeks, 16 total weeks, 143 points
23	Blood, Sweat and Tears	"Spinning Wheel"	Columbia 44871	October 1968	May 1969	30	1.00	US Billboard 1969 #23, Hot100 #2 for 3 weeks, 13 total weeks, 141 points
24	Diana Ross and the Supremes and the Temptations	"I'm Gonna Make You Love Me"	Motown 1135	October 1968	November 21, 1968	20	1.00	US Billboard 1969 #24, Hot100 #2 for 2 weeks, 13 total weeks, 140 points
25	Oliver	"Jean"	Crewe 334	April 1969	July 1969	27	1.00	US Billboard 1969 #25, Hot100 #2 for 2 weeks, 14 total weeks, 139 points, Top Easy Listening Singles 1969 #4, Easy Listening Singles #1 for 4 weeks, 14 total weeks, 232 points
26	Neil Diamond	"Sweet Caroline (Good Times Never Seemed So Good)"	Uni 55136	March 31, 1969	May 28, 1969	34	1.00	US Billboard 1969 #26, Hot100 #4 for 2 weeks, 14 total weeks, 138 points, Grammy Hall of Fame 2020, National Recording Registry 2018
27	Led Zeppelin	"Whole Lotta Love"	Atlantic 2690	August 1969	November 7, 1969	18	6.00	Top Rock Tracks 1969 #2, US Billboard 1969 #27, Hot100 #4 for 1 week, 15 total weeks, 137 points, Grammy Hall of Fame 2007
28	Johnny Cash	"A Boy Named Sue"	Columbia 44944	May 7, 1969	July 2, 1969	28	1.25	US Billboard 1969 #28, Hot100 #2 for 3 weeks, 12 total weeks, 136 points, Top Country Singles 1969 #4, Country Singles #1 for 5 weeks, 14 total weeks, 220 points, National Recording Registry 2003
29	Three Dog Night	"One"	Dunhill 4191	March 1969	April 1969	24	1.00	US Billboard 1969 #29, Hot100 #5 for 3 weeks, 16 total weeks, 136 points
30	Creedence Clearwater Revival	"Bad Moon Rising"	Fantasy 622	March 1969	April 1969	33	1.25	US Billboard 1969 #30, Hot100 #2 for 1 weeks, 14 total weeks, 135 points
31	The Doors	"Touch Me"	T-Neck 901	November 1968	December 1968	16	1.00	US Billboard 1969 #31, Hot100 #3 for 1 week, 13 total weeks, 135 points
32	The Isley Brothers	"It's Your Thing"	T-Neck 901	March 1969	March 1969	25	1.00	US Billboard 1969 #32, Hot100 #2 for 1 week, 14 total weeks, 133 points, Top Soul Singles 1969 #6, Hot Soul Singles #1 for 4 weeks, 14 total weeks, 240 points
33	Creedence Clearwater Revival	"Green River"	Fantasy 625	June 1969	July 1969	41	1.25	US Billboard 1969 #33, Hot100 #2 for 1 weeks, 13 total weeks, 132 points
34	Blood, Sweat and Tears	"You've Made Me So Very Happy"	Columbia 44776	October 16, 1968	February 1969	29	1.00	US Billboard 1969 #34, Hot100 #2 for 3 weeks, 13 total weeks, 131 points
35	Blood, Sweat and Tears	"And When I Die"	Columbia 45000	October 16, 1968	September 30, 1969	22	1.00	US Billboard 1969 #35, Hot100 #2 for 1 week, 13 total weeks, 128 points
36	Marvin Gaye	"Too Busy Thinking About My Baby"	Tamla 54181	March 1969	April 2, 1969	60	6.00	US Billboard 1969 #36, Hot100 #4 for 1 week, 15 total weeks, 126 points, Top Soul Singles 1969 #2, Hot Soul Singles #1 for 6 weeks, 15 total weeks, 279 points
37	Creedence Clearwater Revival	"Down on the Corner"	Fantasy 634	August 1969	October 1969	100	1.25	US Billboard 1969 #37, Hot100 #3 for 1 week, 15 total weeks, 125 points

=== Billboard Top Soul Singles 1969 ===
1	The Temptations	"I Can't Get Next To You"						see number 9.
2	Marvin Gaye	"Too Busy Thinking 'Bout My Baby"						see number 36.
3	Diana Ross and the Supremes	"Someday We'll Be Together"						see number 13.
4	Jr. Walker & The All Stars	"What Does It Take (To Win Your Love)"	Soul 35062	August 1968	October 1968	52	1.00	US Billboard 1969 #43, Hot100 #5 for 2 weeks, 14 total weeks, 113 points, Top Soul Singles 1969 #4, Hot Soul Singles #1 for 2 weeks, 16 total weeks, 244 points
5	The Originals	"Baby, I'm For Real"	Soul 35066	August 7, 1968	August 1968	160	1.00	US Billboard 1969 #84, Hot100 #10 for 1 week, 11 total weeks, 59 points, Top Soul Singles 1969 #5, Hot Soul Singles #1 for 5 weeks, 17 total weeks, 243 points
6	The Isley Brothers	"It's Your Thing"						see number 32.

=== Billboard Top Country Singles 1969 ===
1	Johnny Cash	"Daddy Sang Bass"	Columbia 44689	September 1968	November 6, 1968	187	1.00	US Billboard 1969 #286, Hot100 #42 for 2 weeks, 12 total weeks, Top Country Singles 1969 #1, Country Singles #1 for 6 weeks, 20 total weeks, 269 points
2	Charley Pride	"(I'm So) Afraid of Losing You Again"	RCA Victor 0265	August 28, 1968	October 1969	179	1.00	US Billboard 1969 #479, Hot100 #74 for 1 week, 16 total weeks, 4 points, Top Country Singles 1969 #2, Country Singles #1 for 3 weeks, 16 total weeks, 238 points, Grammy Hall of Fame 1999, National Recording Registry 2010
3	Merle Haggard and The Strangers	"Okie From Muskogee"	Capitol 2626	August 17, 1969	September 29, 1969	179	1.00	US Billboard 1969 #427, Hot100 #63 for 1 week, 6 total weeks, Top Country Singles 1969 #3, Country Singles #1 for 4 weeks, 16 total weeks, 227 points
4	Johnny Cash	"A Boy Named Sue"						see number 28.
5	Sonny James	"Only the Lonely"	Capitol 2370	December 1968	January 1969	187	1.00	US Billboard 1969 #580, Hot100 #92 for 2 weeks, 4 total weeks, Top Country Singles 1969 #5, Country Singles #1 for 3 weeks, 16 total weeks, 206 points

| Top Easy Listening Singles 1969

1	Sammy Davis Jr.	"I've Gotta Be Me"	Reprise 0779	October 26, 1968	December 14, 1968	44	1.00	US Billboard 1969 #98, Hot100 #11 for 1 week, 16 total weeks, 47 points, Top Easy Listening Singles 1969 #1, Easy Listening Singles #1 for 7 weeks, 20 total weeks, 320 points
2	Glen Campbell	"Galveston"	Capitol 2428	March 18, 1969	May 2, 1969	44	1.00	US Billboard 1969 #46, Hot100 #4 for 1 week, 12 total weeks, 107 points, Top Easy Listening Singles 1969 #2, Easy Listening Singles #1 for 6 weeks, 13 total weeks, 245 points
3	Frankie Laine	"You Gave Me a Mountain"	ABC 11174	Nov 25, 1968	Jan 4, 1969	44	1.00	US Billboard 1969 #171, Hot100 #24 for 2 weeks, 11 total weeks, Top Easy Listening Singles 1969 #3, Easy Listening Singles #1 for 2 weeks, 16 total weeks, 242 points
4	Oliver	"Jean"						see number 25
5	Peter, Paul & Mary	"Leavin' On A Jet Plane"						see number 10

=== Top Rock Tracks 1969 (unofficial) ===
1	The Allman Brothers Band	"Whipping Post"	Atco 308	August 7, 1969	November 4, 1969	44		Top Rock Tracks 1969 #1, from The Allman Brothers Band - Atco 308
2	Led Zeppelin	"Whole Lotta Love"						see number 27, from Led Zeppelin II - Atlantic 8236.
3	The Beatles	"Get Back"						see number 4, from Apple single 2490.
4	Creedence Clearwater Revival	"Proud Mary"						see number 19, from Bayou Country - Fantasy 8387.
5	Blind Faith	"Can't Find My Way Home"	Atco 304	March 1969	August 1969			Top Rock Tracks 1969 #5, from Blind Faith - Atco 304
6	The Who	"We're Not Gonna Take It"	Decca 732519	February 7, 1969	July 5, 1969	422		Top Rock Tracks 1969 #6, US Billboard 1969 #250b, from Tommy - Decca 7205
7	The Beatles	"Come Together"						see number 12, from Abbey Road - Apple 383.
8	Neil Young with Crazy Horse	"Down by the River"	Reprise 0836	January 17, 1969	May 14, 1969		1.00	Top Rock Tracks 1969 #8, from Everybody Knows This Is Nowhere - Reprise 6349
9	The Rolling Stones	"Gimme Shelter"	London 4	October 26, 1969	December 5, 1969			Top Rock Tracks 1969 #9, from Let It Bleed - London 4.
10	Jethro Tull	"Living in the Past"	Island 6056	March 18, 1969	May 2, 1969			Top Rock Tracks 1969 #10, from Island single 6056.
11	The Rolling Stones	"Midnight Rambler"	London 4	March 11, 1969	December 5, 1969			Top Rock Tracks 1969 #11, from Let It Bleed - London 4.

== Other hit singles ==
- "Acqua azzurra, acqua chiara/Dieci ragazze" – Lucio Battisti #4 Italy
- "Ajax, Olé Olé Olé" – Willy Alberti
- "Albatross" – Fleetwood Mac
- "Atlantis" – Donovan
- "Baby, I Love You" – Andy Kim #1 Canada, #9 US
- "Badge" – Cream
- "Ballad of John and Yoko" – The Beatles
- "Ball of Fire" – Tommy James and the Shondells #8 Canada
- "Behind a Painted Smile" – The Isley Brothers
- "Blackberry Way" – The Move
- "Black Pearl" – Checkmates, Ltd.#5 NZ
- "Boom Bang-a-Bang" – Lulu
- "The Boxer" – Simon & Garfunkel
- "Break Away" – The Beach Boys
- "Bringing on Back the Good Times" – Love Affair
- "But You Know I Love You" – The First Edition
- "(Call Me) Number One" – The Tremeloes #2 UK
- "Cloud Nine" – The Temptations
- "Come Back and Shake Me" – Clodagh Rodgers
- "Weine Nicht, Kleine Eva" – Die Flippers
- "Do Your Thing" – Charles Wright & the Watts 103rd Street Rhythm Band
- "Don't Forget to Remember" – The Bee Gees
- "Don't Give In to Him" – Gary Puckett & The Union Gap
- "Early in the Morning" – Vanity Fare
- "Easy to Be Hard" – Three Dog Night
- "First of May" – The Bee Gees
- "Frozen Orange Juice" – Peter Sarstedt
- "Gentle on My Mind" – Dean Martin
- "Get Together" – The Youngbloods
- "Gimme Gimme Good Lovin'" – Crazy Elephant
- "Give Peace a Chance" – Plastic Ono Band
- "Going in Circles" – Friends of Distinction
- "Good Morning Starshine" – Oliver
- "Goodbye" – Mary Hopkin
- "Goodnight Midnight" – Clodagh Rodgers
- "Grazing in the Grass" – The Friends of Distinction
- "Happy Heart" – Andy Williams
- "Hare Krishna Mantra" – Radha Krishna Temple
- "Hawaii Five-O" – The Ventures
- "He Ain't Heavy, He's My Brother" – The Hollies
- "Hello Susie" – Amen Corner #4 UK
- "Hooked on a Feeling" – B. J. Thomas
- "I Can Hear Music" – The Beach Boys
- "(If Paradise Is) Half as Nice" – Amen Corner #1 UK
- "I'll Never Fall In Love Again" – Bobbie Gentry
- "I'm Gonna Make You Mine" – Lou Christie
- "I'm Livin' in Shame" – Diana Ross & the Supremes #3 Netherlands
- "Indian Giver" – 1910 Fruitgum Company #5 US
- "In the Ghetto" – Elvis Presley
- "Israelites" – Desmond Dekker and the Aces
- "I Started a Joke" – The Bee Gees #1 Brazil, Denmark, NZ
- "It Miek" – Desmond Dekker and the Aces
- "It's Getting Better" – "Mama" Cass Elliot
- "Je t'aime... moi non plus" – Jane Birkin & Serge Gainsbourg
- "Jingle Jangle" – The Archies #1 Canada
- "Laughing" – The Guess Who #1 Canada
- "Lay Lady Lay" – Bob Dylan
- "The Liquidator" – Harry J All Stars #9 UK
- "L'homme a l'harmonica" – Ennio Morricone
- "Ljuva sextital" – Brita Borg #2 Sweden
- "Love (Can Make You Happy)" – Mercy #2 US
- "Love Me Tonight" – Tom Jones #9 UK
- "Make Me An Island" – Joe Dolan #2, BEL, IRE, SA, UK
- "Man of the World" – Fleetwood Mac
- "Melting Pot" – Blue Mink
- "Mon bel amour d'été" – Mireille Mathieu
- "More Today Than Yesterday" – Spiral Starecase #6 Canada
- "My Cherie Amour" – Stevie Wonder
- "My Sentimental Friend" – Herman's Hermits
- "My Way" – Frank Sinatra
- "Natural Born Bugie" – Humble Pie
- "Nobody's Child" – Karen Young #6 UK
- "Oh Happy Day" – Edwin Hawkins Singers
- "Oh Well" – Fleetwood Mac
- "The Onion Song" – Marvin Gaye & Tammi Terrell
- "Pastorale" – Ramses Shaffy & Liesbeth List
- "Pinball Wizard" – The Who
- "Raindrops Keep Fallin' on My Head" – B. J. Thomas
- "Reuben James" – Kenny Rogers and The First Edition
- "Ruby, Don't Take Your Love to Town" – Kenny Rogers and The First Edition
- "Run Away Child, Running Wild" – The Temptations
- "Saved By The Bell" – Robin Gibb
- "Something in the Air" – Thunderclap Newman #1 UK
- "Something's Happening" – Herman's Hermits
- "Son Of A Preacher Man"- Dusty Springfield
- "Sorry Suzanne" – The Hollies
- "Soul Deep" – The Box Tops
- "Soulful Strut" – Young-Holt Unlimited #1 Canada
- "Space Oddity" – David Bowie
- "Surround Yourself with Sorrow" – Cilla Black
- "Sweet Cherry Wine" – Tommy James and the Shondells
- "That's The Way God Planned It" – Billy Preston
- "These Eyes" – The Guess Who
- "This Girl Is a Woman Now" – Gary Puckett & The Union Gap #3 Canada
- "This Girl's In Love With You" – Dionne Warwick
- "Time Is Tight" – Booker T. & the M.G.'s
- "Time of the Season" – The Zombies #1 Canada
- "To Love Somebody" – Nina Simone
- "Traces" – Classics IV #2 US
- "Tracy" – Cuff Links
- "Two Little Boys" – Rolf Harris #1 UK
- "Viva Bobby Joe" – The Equals
- "The Wedding Cake" - Connie Francis
- "When I Die" – Motherlode #1 Canada
- "Where Do You Go To (My Lovely)?" – Peter Sarstedt
- "Who Do You Love?" – Juicy Lucy
- "Why?" – The Cats #1 NL
- "Worst That Could Happen" – The Brooklyn Bridge #1 Canada
- "Yester-Me, Yester-You, Yesterday" – Stevie Wonder
- "You Showed Me" – The Turtles #5 NL

== Published popular music ==
- 1776: all songs by Sherman Edwards
- "Aa Jaane Jaan" w. Rajendra Krishan, m. Laxmikant–Pyarelal, from the film Intaqam
- "The April Fools" w. Hal David m. Burt Bacharach from the film The April Fools
- "Bad Moon Rising" w.m. John C. Fogerty
- "The Brady Bunch theme", by Frank DeVol
- "Bridge over Troubled Water" w.m. Paul Simon
- "Didn't We?" w.m. Jimmy Webb
- "Down on the Corner" w.m. John C. Fogerty
- "Everybody's Talkin'" w.m. Fred Neil
- "Hawaii Five-O" m. Mort Stevens
- If You Could Read My Mind" w.m. Gordon Lightfoot
- "In The Ghetto" w.m.Mac Davis
- "Is That All There Is?" w.m. Jerry Leiber & Mike Stoller
- "Israelites" w.m. Desmond Dekker & Leslie Kong
- "Keem-O-Sabe" m. Bernard Binnick & Bernice Borisoff
- "Jean" w.m. Rod McKuen from the film The Prime of Miss Jean Brodie
- "Just Leave Everything to Me" w.m. Jerry Herman, from the film version of Hello, Dolly!
- "Leaving on a Jet Plane" w.m. John Denver
- "Le métèque" w.m. Georges Moustaki
- "Marrakesh Express" w.m. Graham Nash
- "Mere Sapno Ki Rani" w. Anand Bakshi, m. Sachin Dev Burman, from the film Aradhana
- "Mná na hÉireann" w. Peadar Ó Doirnín, m. Seán Ó Riada
- "Odds and Ends (Of a Beautiful Love Affair)" w. Hal David m. Burt Bacharach
- "Piddle, Twiddle And Resolve" w.m. Sherman Edwards
- "Proud Mary" w.m. John C. Fogerty
- "Put a Little Love in Your Heart" w.m. Jimmy Holiday, Randy Myers & Jackie DeShannon
- "Raindrops Keep Fallin' On My Head" w.Hal David m. Burt Bacharach. Introduced by B. J. Thomas on the soundtrack of the film Butch Cassidy and the Sundance Kid. The song won the Academy Award.
- "Suspicious Minds" w.m. Fred Zambon
- "Sweet Caroline" w.m. Neil Diamond
- "Teddybjörnen Fredriksson" w.m. Lasse Berghagen
- "What Are You Doing the Rest of Your Life?" w. Alan and Marilyn Bergman m. Michel Legrand
- "Yellow River" w.m. Christie
- "You Don't Love Me When I Cry" w.m. Laura Nyro

== Classical music ==
- Rob du Bois
  - Because Going Nowhere Takes a Long Time, version for soprano, clarinet, and piano
  - Enigma, for flute, bass clarinet, percussion, and piano
  - Jeu, for oboe
  - Pastorale I, for oboe, clarinet, and harp (revised version)
  - Réflexions sur le jour où Pérotin le Grand ressuscitera, for wind quintet
  - Souvenir, for violin
  - Symposion, for oboe, violin, viola, and cello
  - Trio agitato, for horn, trombone, and tuba
- Benjamin Britten
  - Suite for harp, Op. 83
  - Who Are These Children?, song cycle for tenor and piano, Op. 84
- Gavin Bryars – The Sinking of the Titanic
- Sylvano Bussotti – Rara Requiem
- Gian Paolo Chiti – Violin Concerto
- George Crumb
  - Night of the Four Moons for alto, alto flute/piccolo, banjo, electric cello, and percussion
  - Madrigals, Books III (for soprano, harp, and percussion) and Books IV for soprano, flute/alto flute/piccolo, harp, double bass, and percussion
- Mario Davidovsky – Synchronisms No. 5 for percussion players and tape
- Peter Maxwell Davies – St Thomas Wake
- Vagn Holmboe – String Quartet no. 10, Op. 102
- György Ligeti – Ramifications for 12 solo strings (1968–69)
- Francis Jackson – Sonata for Organ No. 1
- Miklós Rózsa – Concerto for Cello
- Dmitri Shostakovich – Symphony No. 14, Op. 135, for soprano, bass, string orchestra and percussion
- Karlheinz Stockhausen
  - Dr K–Sextett, for flute, bass clarinet, viola, cello, percussion (tubular chimes and vibraphone), and piano
  - Fresco. for four orchestral groups
  - Hymnen, Third Region, electronic music with orchestra
  - Momente (third and final version)
  - Stop (Paris version, for 19 players)
- Leif Thybo – Concerto for Violin and Orchestra
- Eduard Tubin – Symphony No. 9, "Sinfonia semplice"
- Iannis Xenakis
  - Synaphaï, for piano and orchestra
  - Persephassa, for 6 percussionists
  - Anaktoria, for clarinet, bassoon, horn, string quartet and double bass
- Hans Zender – Canto II, for soprano, chorus and orchestra (after Ezra Pound's Canto XXXIX)

== Opera ==
- Gordon Crosse – The Grace of Todd
- Jakov Gotovac – Petar Svačić
- Tom Phillips – Irma (composed; premiere in 1970)
- Henri Pousseur – Votre Faust (Milan: Piccola Scala, 15 January)

== Musical theater ==
- 1776 Broadway production opened at the 46th Street Theatre on March 16, transferred to the St. James Theatre on December 28, 1970, and transferred to the Majestic Theatre on April 27, 1971, for a total run of 1217 performances
- Ann Veronica ( Music: Cyril Ornadel, Lyrics: David Croft) London production opened at the Cambridge Theatre on April 17 and ran for 44 performances
- Canterbury Tales Broadway production ran for 121 performances
- Coco (Music: André Previn, Lyrics: Alan Jay Lerner, Book: Alan Jay Lerner) Broadway production opened at the Mark Hellinger Theatre on December 18 and ran for 329 performances
- Dear World Broadway production opened at the Mark Hellinger Theatre on February 6 and ran for 132 performances
- La Strada (Music and Lyrics: Lionel Bart) Broadway production opened at the Lunt-Fontanne Theatre on December 14 and ran for one performance
- Mame London production opened at the Theatre Royal on February 20 and ran for 443 performances
- Promises, Promises London production opened at the Prince of Wales Theatre on October 2 and ran for 560 performances

== Musical films ==
- Aradhana, Hindi film
- Can Heironymus Merkin Ever Forget Mercy Humppe and Find True Happiness?, British film
- El Profesor Hippie, Argentine musical comedy
- Goodbye, Mr. Chips, starring Peter O'Toole and Petula Clark
- Hello, Dolly!, starring Barbra Streisand and Walter Matthau
- Oh! What a Lovely War, starring Maggie Smith and Dirk Bogarde
- Paint Your Wagon, starring Lee Marvin and Clint Eastwood
- Przygoda z piosenką (Adventure with Song) Polish musical comedy
- Sweet Charity, starring Shirley MacLaine
- Bremenskiye musykanty (Town Musicians of Bremen), Soviet musical cartoon

== Publications ==
- Nik Cohn – Pop – From The Beginning (later editions as Awopbopaloobop Alopbamboom)

== Births ==
- January 3 – Bayani Agbayani, Filipino TV personality
- January 4 – Boris Berezovsky, pianist
- January 5 – Marilyn Manson, industrial rock metal singer-songwriter and visual artist
- January 11 – Maxee, American singer and songwriter (Brownstone) (d. 2015)
- January 14 – Dave Grohl, American singer-songwriter, musician, record producer, film director and activist (Nirvana, Foo Fighters)
- January 17 – Tiësto, Dutch DJ
- January 25 – Kina, American singer-songwriter
- January 27 – Cornelius, Japanese shibuya-kei musician
- February 1
  - Joshua Redman, American saxophonist and composer
  - Patrick Wilson, American drummer (Weezer, The Special Goodness and The Rentals)
- February 2 – Dana International, Israeli Eurovision-winning pop singer
- February 5 – Bobby Brown, American R&B singer (New Edition)
- February 10 – Sandra Studer, Swiss television presenter and singer
- February 12 – Meja, Swedish pop singer
- February 13 – Joyce DiDonato, American operatic lyric-coloratura mezzo-soprano
- February 15 – Birdman, American rapper
- February 19 – Burton C. Bell, American musician and vocalist (Fear Factory)
- February 21
  - James Dean Bradfield, Welsh rock singer-songwriter (Manic Street Preachers)
  - Bosson, Swedish singer-songwriter
- March 1
  - Dafydd Ieuan, Welsh rock drummer (Super Furry Animals)
  - Christina Bergmark, Swedish singer-songwriter and keyboardist (The Wannadies)
- March 4 – Chaz Bono, American writer, musician and actor son of Sonny Bono and Cher
- March 9
  - Adam Siegel, American multi-instrumentalist (Excel, Infectious Grooves)
  - La India, Puerto Rican singer and songwriter
- March 11
  - Pete Droge, American folk rock musician
  - Rami Jaffee, American musician (Foo Fighters, The Wallflowers)
- March 12 – Graham Coxon, American singer-songwriter, guitarist (Blur)
- March 13 – Susanna Mälkki, Finnish cellist and orchestra conductor
- March 14 – Michael Bland, American drummer (New Power Generation)
- March 18 – Andy Cutting, English folk accordionist
- March 21 – Ms. Melodie, American rapper (Boogie Down Productions) (d. 2012)
- March 25 – Cathy Dennis, British singer-songwriter, composer, record producer, musician and actress
- March 26
  - Jason Lytle, American singer (Grandaddy)
  - Fatlip, American rapper (The Pharcyde)
- March 27 – Mariah Carey, American singer-songwriter
- March 30 – Nuša Derenda, Slovenian singer
- April 7 – Ajay Devgn, Indian actor
- April 8 – Dulce Pontes, Portuguese singer-songwriter
- April 10 – Steve Glasson, Australian bowls player
- April 11 – Cerys Matthews, Welsh singer-songwriter, author and broadcaster
- April 21 - Traci Paige Johnson, American animator and writer (Blue's Clues, Blue's Clues & You!)
- April 22 – Craig Logan, Scottish musician, songwriter, and manager (Bros)
- April 27
  - Darcey Bussell, ballerina
  - Mica Paris, singer
- April 29
  - Paul Adelstein, American actor and writer
  - İzel, Turkish pop singer
- May 7 – Mox Cristadoro, Italian drummer (Monumentum)
- May 9 – Amber, Dutch singer, songwriter and record producer
- May 10 – DJ Rhettmatic, American disc jockey and record producer
- May 13 – Buckethead (born Brian Caroll), guitarist.
- May 14 – Danny Wood (New Kids on the Block)
- May 15 – Assala Nasri, musical artist
- May 18 – Martika, American singer-songwriter and actress,
- May 20 – Dave Dresden, American DJ and record producer (Gabriel & Dresden)
- May 24 – Rich Robinson (The Black Crowes)
- May 29 – Chandler Kinchla (Blues Traveler)
- May 31
  - Sarah-Jane McGrath, singer-songwriter
  - Blaq Poet, American rapper (Screwball)
  - Tony Cetinski, Croatian singer
- June 5 – Brian McKnight, singer-songwriter
- June 7 – Armando Tranquilino, composer
- June 8 – Abra Moore, American folk-styled rock singer-songwriter
- June 11 – Steven Drozd, American musician (The Flaming Lips)
- June 13 – Søren Rasted, Aqua
- June 15 – Ice Cube, rapper
- June 16 – Bénabar, singer-songwriter
- June 20 – Shweta Shetty, Indian-German singer
- June 25
  - Hunter Foster, American actor and singer
  - Zim Zum, American guitarist and songwriter (The Pop Culture Suicides)
- June 26 – Colin Greenwood, English bassist (Radiohead)
- June 28 – Danielle Brisebois, American producer, singer-songwriter and former child actress.
- July 2
  - Jenni Rivera, American singer-songwriter, producer and actress (d. 2012)
  - Tony Touch, American rapper
- July 3 – Kevin Hearn (Barenaked Ladies)
- July 5 – RZA, American rapper, record producer and author
- July 7
  - Nathalie Simard, Canadian singer (René Simard)
  - Cree Summer, American-Canadian singer-songwriter and actress (Subject to Change)
- July 8
  - George Fisher, American singer-songwriter (Cannibal Corpse, Monstrosity and Paths of Possession)
  - Sugizo, Japanese singer-songwriter, guitarist, producer and actor (Luna Sea, X Japan, Juno Reactor and S.K.I.N.)
- July 10 – Jonas Kaufmann, operatic tenor
- July 12 – Lady Saw, Jamaican singer and songwriter
- July 15 – Jason Sutter, American musician and drummer
- July 19 – Gabrielle, English singer and songwriter
- July 20
  - Joon Park, South Korean-American actor, singer and rapper (g.o.d)
  - Vitamin C, American pop singer (Eve's Plum)
- July 24 – Jennifer Lopez, American singer, actress, songwriter, performer, dancer, author, philanthropist and producer
- August 6 – Elliott Smith, indie singer-songwriter (d. 2003)
- August 12 – Tanita Tikaram, British pop/folk singer-songwriter
- August 17
  - Uhm Jung-hwa, South Korean actress and singer
  - Kelvin Mercer, American rapper and producer (De La Soul)
  - Donnie Wahlberg (New Kids on the Block)
- August 18
  - Everlast, singer
  - Masta Killa, American rapper (La Coka Nostra)
  - Christian Slater, American actor
- August 19
  - Clay Walker, country singer
  - Nate Dogg, American rapper (d. 2011)
- August 21 – Antonio Carbonell, Spanish singer-songwriter
- August 26
  - Daníel Ágúst Haraldsson, Icelandic singer and producer (GusGus)
  - Adrian Young, American musician (No Doubt)
- August 28 – Mary McCartney, English photographer, documentary filmmaker, cookbook author, and activist daughter of Paul McCartney and Linda McCartney
- August 29 – Meshell Ndegeocello, funk singer-songwriter and rapper
- September 2 – K-Ci, American R&B singer and songwriter (K-Ci & JoJo)
- September 4 – Sasha, Welsh DJ and record producer
- September 5 – Dweezil Zappa, guitarist and son of Frank Zappa
- September 6 – CeCe Peniston, singer
- September 15 – KayGee, American disc jockey and record producer (Naughty by Nature)
- September 16
  - Matthew Settle, American actor
  - Janno Gibbs, Filipino singer-songwriter
  - Justine Frischmann, English singer (Elastica)
- September 17
  - Lynette Diaz, American born singer-songwriter and radio host
  - Keith Flint, English electronic music singer and dancer (The Prodigy) (d. 2019)
- September 18 – Cappadonna, American rapper (Wu-Tang Clan)
- September 19 – Jóhann Jóhannsson, Icelandic composer (d. 2018)
- September 22 – Money-B, American rapper (Digital Underground)
- September 23 – Patrick Fiori, French singer-songwriter
- September 24
  - Shawn Crahan, percussionist/backing vocalist for Slipknot
  - DeVante Swing, singer-songwriter, record producer
- October 1 – Simone Stelzer, Austrian pop singer
- October 3 – Gwen Stefani, American singer-songwriter, fashion designer and actress (No Doubt)
- October 7
  - Per Mathisen, Norwegian bass player and composer
  - Maria Whittaker, English model, actress and singer
- October 8 – Bob D'Amico, American drummer (The Fiery Furnaces, Sebadoh)
- October 9 – PJ Harvey, English musician, singer-songwriter, writer, poet and composer
- October 16
  - Roy Hargrove, American trumpeter and composer (d. 2018)
  - Wendy Wilson, American singer and television personality Wilson Phillips
  - Lee Beom-soo, South Korean actor
  - Martie Maguire, American musician (The Chicks)
- October 17 – Wyclef Jean, Haitian rapper, musician and actor (Fugees)
- October 19 – DJ Sammy, Spanish DJ
- October 22 – Helmut Lotti, Belgian singer
- October 30 – Snow, reggae musician
- November 2 – Fieldy, American bassist (Korn)
- November 3 – Robert Miles, DJ
- November 4 – Sean Combs (P. Diddy), rapper
- November 9 – Scarface, rapper
- November 13 – Josh Mancell, American drummer and composer (The Moon Upstairs)
- December 4
  - Scott St. John, viola player
  - Jay-Z, rapper
- December 3 – Thomas Forstner, Austrian singer
- December 9 – Jakob Dylan, American rock singer-songwriter (The Wallflowers), son of Bob Dylan and Sara Lownds
- December 17 – Michael V., Filipino Television Personality
- December 17 – Mick Quinn, English musician, producer and singer-songwriter (Supergrass)
- December 19 – Aziza Mustafa Zadeh, Azerbaijani jazz musician and singer
- December 21 – Julie Delpy, French-American actress, film director, screenwriter and singer-songwriter
- December 24 – Mariko Shiga, Japanese singer (d. 1989)
- December 30
  - Matt Goldman, American record producer
  - Jay Kay, English singer (Jamiroquai)
  - David Rawlings, American guitarist, singer and record producer

== Deaths ==
- January 4 – Paul Chambers, jazz bassist (b. 1935) (tuberculosis)
- January 17 – Grażyna Bacewicz, Polish composer and violinist (b. 1909)
- January 24 – Pauline Hall, Norwegian music critic and composer (born 1890)
- February 15 – Pee Wee Russell, jazz clarinetist (b. 1906)
- February 20 – Ernest Ansermet, conductor (b. 1883)
- February 23 – Constantin Silvestri, conductor and composer (b. 1913)
- March 25 – Billy Cotton, bandleader (b. 1899)
- March 26 – Clara Dow, operatic soprano (b. 1883)
- April 2 – Fortunio Bonanova, baritone (b. 1895)
- April 4 – Fanny Anitùa, operatic contralto (b. 1887)
- April 10 – Fernando Ortiz, ethnomusicologist (b. 1881)
- April 20 – Benny Benjamin ("Papa Zita"), drummer (b. 1925) (stroke)
- April 22 – Amparo Iturbi, Spanish pianist (b. 1898)
- April 23 – Krzysztof Komeda, jazz musician and composer (b. 1931) (haematoma)
- April 29 – Julius Katchen, pianist (b. 1926) (cancer)
- May 1 – Ella Logan, actress and singer (b. 1913)
- May 3 – Muriel Wilson, soprano (b. 1901)
- May 9 – Elias Breeskin, violinist, conductor and composer (b. 1896)
- May 17 – Maria Olszewska, operatic contralto (b. 1892)
- May 22 – Nicola Salerno, Italian lyricist (b. 1910)
- May 23 – Jimmy McHugh, US composer and pianist (b. 1894)
- June 14
  - Roberto Firpo, Argentine tango pianist (b. 1884)
  - Wynonie Harris, R & B singer ("Mister Blues") (b. 1915)
- June 17 – Rita Abatzi, rebetiko musician (b. 1914)
- June 22 – Judy Garland, singer and actress (b. 1922) (overdose of barbiturates)
- July 3 – Brian Jones, guitarist, founder member of The Rolling Stones (b. 1942) (drowned)
- July 5 – Wilhelm Backhaus, pianist (b. 1884)
- July 10 – Thomas King Ekundayo Phillips, church music composer (b. 1884)
- July 11 – Hina Spani, operatic soprano (b. 1896)
- July 20 – Roy Hamilton, American singer (b. 1929; stroke)
- July 28 – Frank Loesser, US songwriter (b. 1910)
- August 6 – Theodor Adorno, exponent of the "New Music" (b. 1903)
- August 11 – Miriam Licette, operatic soprano (b. 1885)
- August 13 – Jacob do Bandolim, mandolin player and composer (b. 1918)
- September 5 – Josh White, blues musician (b. 1914)
- September 14 – Alice Zeppilli, operatic soprano (b. 1885)
- October 3 – Skip James, blues musician (b. 1902)
- October 4 – Natalino Otto, Italian singer (b. 1912)
- October 8 – Eduardo Ciannelli, Italian actor and singer (b. 1888)
- October 22 – Tommy Edwards, singer (b. 1922)
- November 8 – Ricardo Aguirre, protest singer (b. 1939)
- November 13 – Boris Kroyt, classical violinist and violist, member of the Budapest String Quartet from 1936 to 1967 (b. 1897)
- November 18 – Ted Heath, bandleader (b. 1902)
- November 23 – Spade Cooley, swing musician and murderer (b. 1910) (heart attack)
- December 1 – Magic Sam, blues musician (b. 1937) (heart attack)
- December 5 – James "Stump" Johnson, blues pianist (b. 1902)
- December 6 – Walther Aeschbacher, Swiss conductor and composer (b. 1901)
- December 22 – Wilbur Hatch, pianist, composer and conductor (b. 1902)
- December 24 – Mary Barratt Due, pianist, music teacher (b. 1888)
- date unknown – Marcel LaFosse, trumpeter (b. 1895)
- probable – Mississippi Joe Callicott, blues musician (b. 1900)

== Awards ==
=== Grammy Awards ===
- Grammy Awards of 1969

=== Eurovision Song Contest ===
- Eurovision Song Contest 1969

=== Leeds International Piano Competition ===
- Radu Lupu
