= 1969 in heavy metal music =

This is a timeline documenting the events of heavy metal in the year 1969.

== Bands formed ==
- Aguaturbia
- The Allman Brothers Band
- April Wine
- Argent
- Atomic Rooster
- Bang
- Blackfoot
- Blind Faith
- Bloodrock
- Blue Mountain Eagle
- Blues Creation
- Brownsville Station
- Budka Suflera
- Cactus
- Coven
- Crushed Butler
- Dust
- Elonkorjuu
- Eloy
- Epitaph
- Faces
- Focus
- Gary Moore
- Grand Funk Railroad
- Granicus
- Hawkwind
- High Tide
- Hot Tuna
- Hookfoot
- Humble Pie
- Iron Claw
- Jacula
- Josefus
- Judas Priest (as Freight)
- King Crimson
- Leaf Hound
- Little Free Rock
- May Blitz
- Morly Grey
- Mott the Hoople
- Mountain
- Neon Rose
- November
- Thin Lizzy
- Titanic
- Toe Fat
- Trapeze
- Truth and Janey
- Tucky Buzzard
- UFO
- Uriah Heep
- Wishbone Ash
- ZZ Top

== Albums ==
- Morgen – Morgen
- Writing on the Wall - The Power of the Picts

=== January ===
Day	Artist	Album
17	Iron Butterfly	Ball
20	Led Zeppelin	Led Zeppelin

=== February ===
Day	Artist	Album
5	Cream	Goodbye
	MC5	Kick Out the Jams
	Vanilla Fudge	Near the Beginning

=== March ===
Day	Artist	Album
	Blue Cheer	New! Improved!
	James Gang	Yer' Album
	Steppenwolf	At Your Birthday Party

=== May ===
Day	Artist	Album
9	Slade	Beginnings
19	The Who	Tommy

=== June ===
Day	Artist	Album
25	Alice Cooper	Pretties for You
	Deep Purple	Deep Purple
	The Jeff Beck Group	Beck-Ola
	Coven	Witchcraft Destroys Minds & Reaps Souls

=== July ===
Day	Artist	Album
	Blossom Toes	If Only for a Moment
	Edgar Broughton Band	Wasa Wasa
	Leslie West	Mountain

=== August ===
Day	Artist	Album
5	The Stooges	The Stooges
25	Grand Funk Railroad	On Time
	Humble Pie	As Safe as Yesterday Is

=== September ===
Day	Artist	Album
	Vanilla Fudge	Rock & Roll

=== October ===
Day	Artist	Album
10	King Crimson	In the Court of the Crimson King
10	The Kinks	Arthur (Or the Decline and Fall of the British Empire)
22	Led Zeppelin	Led Zeppelin II
	High Tide	Sea Shanties

=== November ===
Day	Artist	Album
	Humble Pie	Town and Country
	Little Free Rock	Little Free Rock
	Mott the Hoople	Mott the Hoople
	Steppenwolf	Monster

=== December ===
Day	Artist	Album
29	Grand Funk Railroad	Grand Funk (The Red Album)
	Blue Cheer	Blue Cheer
