= Harvest Time =

Harvest Time may refer to:

- Harvest Time (film), a 2004 Russian drama film
- Harvest Time (Elonkorjuu album), 1972.
- Harvest Time (Chisato Moritaka album), 1999
