= Granicus =

Granicus may refer to:

- Granicus River, also called Biga River (Turkish: Biga Çayı)
- Battle of the Granicus River, between Alexander the Great and the Persian Empire in May 334 BC
- Granicus (band), a band formed in 1969
- Granicus Valles, a network of valleys on Mars
