= Pat Upton =

Pat Upton may refer to:

- Pat Upton (politician) (1944–1999), Irish Labour Party politician
- Pat Upton (singer) (1940–2016), American singer
