= Acme siren =

Musical instrument that sounds like police siren

The Acme siren is a musical instrument often used for comic sound effects. Originally created by Acme Whistles in 1895, it produces the stylized sound of a police siren. It is one of the few aerophones in the percussion section.

The instrument is typically made of metal and is cylindrical. Inside the cylinder is a type of fan-blade which, when the performer blows through one end, spins and creates the sound. The faster the performer blows, the faster the fan-blade moves and the higher the pitch the instrument creates. Conversely, the slower the performer blows, the lower the pitch.

Iannis Xenakis used it in the 1960s in his works Oresteia, Terretektorh, and Persephassa. A siren was used in Bob Dylan's classic album, Highway 61 Revisited. One is also heard in Stevie Wonder's song "Sir Duke" just before the second chorus, and in Supertramp's song "The Logical Song" immediately after the final chorus.
