= At Home with The Dubliners =

At Home with the Dubliners

Studio album by The Dubliners
- Released: 1969
- Genre: Irish folk
- Label: EMI-Columbia
- Producer: Bill Martin, Phil Coulter

The Dubliners chronology
Live at the Albert Hall (1969)	At Home with the Dubliners (1969)	It's The Dubliners (1969)

Professional ratings
Review scores
Source	Rating
Allmusic	3/5 stars

At Home with the Dubliners is the first album that The Dubliners made with producers Bill Martin and Phil Coulter. Their contract with Major Minor had ended at this point and they signed with EMI-Columbia Records. Some rare pressings feature the tracks "Bold Princess Royal" and "The Beggarman". The former can only be heard on YouTube, while the latter is available on the box set Best of the Original Dubliners.

The album cover is of The Dubliners sitting in front of the fireplace of the back room (known as the Tap Room) of The Wren's Nest Public House, Strawberry Beds, Chapelizod, Dublin 20, Ireland.

== Track listing ==
Side One:

1. "God Save Ireland"
2. "Sam Hall"
3. "The Scholar / The Teetotaller"
4. "Dainty Davy"
5. "High Germany"
6. "Humpty Dumpty"

Side Two:

1. "Molly Maguires"
2. "Cuanla"
3. "Lowlands of Holland"
4. "Ragtime Annie"
5. "Greenland Whale Fishery"
6. "Saxon Shilling"

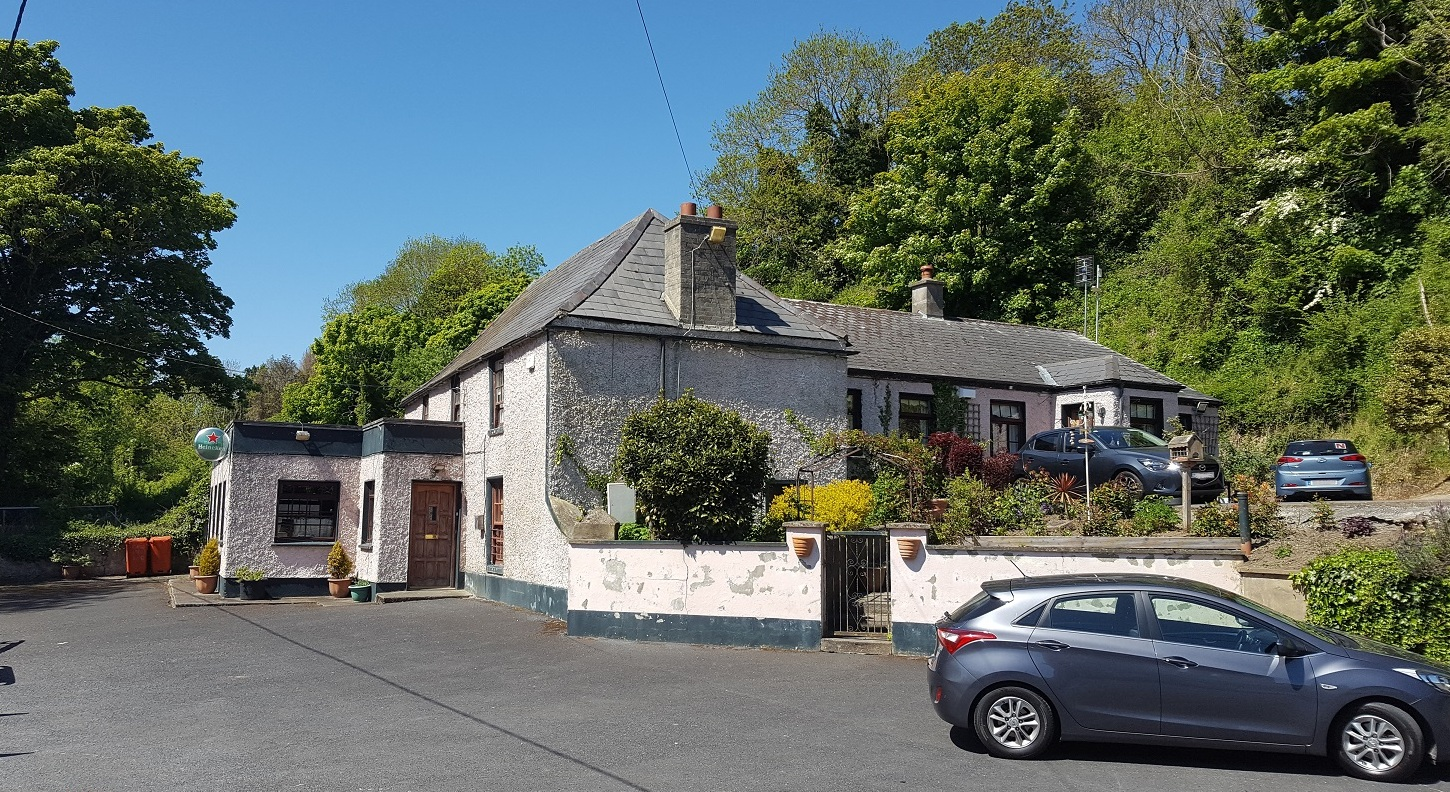
The Wren's Nest pub, Strawberry Beds, north bank of the river Liffey
