= More Today Than Yesterday =

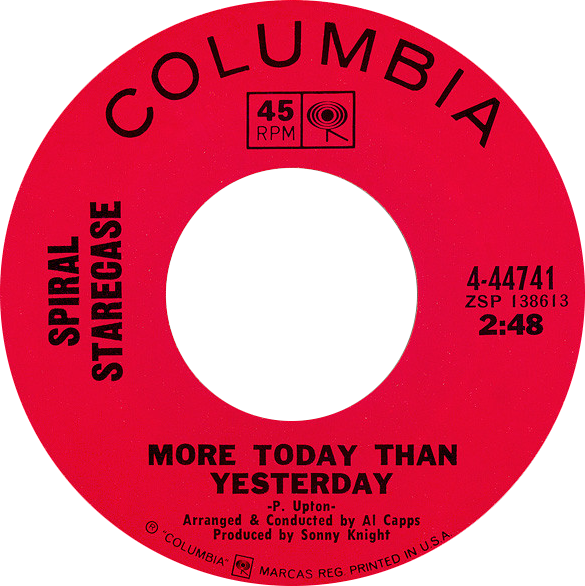
- Side A of the US single

Single by Spiral Starecase

from the album More Today Than Yesterday
- B-side: "Broken-Hearted Man"
- Released: January 7, 1969 (US); April 1969 (UK)
- Recorded: 1968
- Genre: Sunshine pop; pop soul
- Length: 2:56
- Label: Columbia 44741
- Songwriter: Pat Upton
- Producer: Sonny Knight

Spiral Starecase singles chronology
"I'll Run" (1968)	"More Today Than Yesterday" (1969)	"No One for Me to Turn To" (1969)

"More Today Than Yesterday" is a song written by Pat Upton and performed by Spiral Starecase, of which Upton was the lead vocalist. The song was produced by Sonny Knight and arranged by Al Capps.

== Background ==
The principal idea of the song was made famous at the turn of the 20th century in a poem by Rosemonde Gérard, the wife of the poet and playwright Edmond Rostand (Cyrano de Bergerac).

== Chart performance ==
It reached number 1 on the KHJ Boss Radio survey, number 6 in Canada, No. 7 on the Cashbox Top 100, and number 12 on the Billboard Hot 100 in 1969. It was also released in the United Kingdom as a single but did not chart until its lone frame at number 91 in mid-2014. The song was featured on their 1969 album, More Today Than Yesterday. It ranked number 50 on Billboard magazine's Top Hot 100 songs of 1969.

=== Weekly charts ===
Chart (1969)	Peak position
Canadian RPM Top Singles	6
US Billboard Hot 100	12
US Cash Box Top 100	7

=== Year-end charts ===
Chart (1969)	Rank
Canada	63
US Billboard Hot 100	50
US Cash Box Top 100	67

== See also ==
- List of one-hit wonders in the United States
