= Arcadium =

UK musical group

Arcadium was a British psychedelic group who released one album in 1969. The band was led by Miguel Sergides who was joined by John Albert Parker, Graham Best, Allen Ellwood and Robert Ellwood.

The band began playing in small clubs before being signed by the fledgling Middle Earth label. The company released a total of five albums before closing shop, and the poor sound quality of their production can be heard in the original pressings of Arcadium's lone LP, Breathe Awhile. The band broke up after the commercial failure of the album and while it remained an obscure record it was reissued on CD in 2003 by Akarma with two bonus songs.

== Breathe Awhile (1969) ==
=== Track listing ===
Side one
No.	Title	Writer(s)	Length
1.	"I'm on My Way"	Miguel Sergides	11:52
2.	"Poor Lady"	Miguel Sergides	3:58
3.	"Walk on the Bad Side"	Miguel Sergides	7:30

Side two
No.	Title	Writer(s)	Length
1.	"Woman of a Thousand Years"	Miguel Sergides	4:00
2.	"Change Me"	Miguel Sergides	4:45
3.	"It Takes a Woman"	Miguel Sergides	4:05
4.	"Birth, Life and Death"	Miguel Sergides	10:45

=== 2003 CD Bonus Tracks ===
No.	Title	Length
8.	"Sing My Song"	4:13
9.	"Riding Alone"	2:48

== Personnel ==
- Miguel Sergides - Lead vocals, Twelve-string guitar
- John Albert Parker - Drums
- Graham Best - Bass, Vocals
- Allan Ellwood - Organ, Vocals
- Robert Ellwood - Lead guitar, Vocals
