= Neon Rose =

- Origin: Stockholm, Sweden
- Genres: Hard rock
- Years active: 1969–1975; 1977; 1981
- Labels: Vertigo Records
- Website: Neonrose.nu

Neon Rose was a Swedish hard rock band. They released three albums between 1974 and 1975, but failed to make any impact outside of their native country.

== History ==
The band arose in 1969 by members Roger Holegard, Piero Mengarelli and Benno Mengarelli under the name Spider; when the drummer Stanley Larsson joined the group in 1973 they took the name Neon Rose. Signing with Vertigo Records in 1974, their debut album, A Dream of Glory and Pride, was released the same year, and was followed with a sophomore effort, Two, early in 1975. Following the recording of this album, Stanley Larsson left the group and was replaced by Thomas Wiklund, formerly of Uppåt Väggarna. The group's final album, Reload, was released in 1975 and the group split, with Holegard going on to join Wasa Express.

Piero Mengarelli attempted to reform the group with all new members in 1977, but this incarnation disbanded after recording a few demos. In 1981, the group reformed with the Mengareilli brothers and several new members. They recorded one single for Rosa Honung Records which never was issued.

== Members ==
Original members

- Roger Holegård - vocals, guitar, mellotron
- Piero Mengarelli - guitar
- Gunnar Hallin - guitar (1974–1975)
- Benno Mengarelli - bass
- Kenta Krull - drums (1969–1973)
- Stanley Larsson - drums (1973–75)
- Thomas Wiklund - drums (1975)

1981 reunion members

- Piero Mengarelli - guitar and vocals
- Benno Mengarelli - bass
- Joaquin Calafell - drums
- Erik Svensson - keyboards
- Conny Bloom - guitar

== Discography ==
- A Dream of Glory and Pride (Vertigo, 1974)
- Two (Vertigo, 1975)
- Reload (Vertigo, 1975)
