= Little Free Rock =

British rock band

- Origin: Preston, Lancashire, England
- Genres: Psychedelic rock, hard rock, freakbeat (early)
- Years active: 1969–1972
- Label: Transatlantic

Little Free Rock was an English late 1960s psychedelic hard rock trio from Preston in Lancashire. It featured Peter Illingworth (lead guitar and vocals) (born 21 July 1943, Inglewhite Road, Longridge, Lancashire died 15 November 2021, Brentwood, Essex) (formerly with David John and the Mood who recorded with Joe Meek), Paul Varley (drums) (later with Arrows) and Frank Newbold (bass and vocals) (b. 9 January 1945, Preston, Lancashire). They began performing covers of The Who, The Creation ("Making Time" appeared on their album) and Tomorrow, but were soon doing mainly their own compositions.

The band performed regularly at the Roundhouse Sunday Night Implosion events and had numerous residencies at the Marquee Club. As well as performing all over Belgium, continental trips included the Star-Club in Hamburg, the Essen Jazz and Blues Festival, and festivals in Frankfurt, San Tropez and Santa Margarita de la Costa in Italy.

The band's second album, Time Is of No Consequence, received a two-star rating from AllMusic, whose reviewer Richie Unterberger noted, "On these recordings, the band plays bluesy hard rock of the school founded by Cream and Fleetwood Mac, using African-influenced percussive grooves at times."

They changed their name from Purple Haze to avoid confusion with the Jimi Hendrix single.

Peter Green (Fleetwood Mac) joined the band for a short period, but the recordings were never released.

== Discography ==
- Little Free Rock LP, Transatlantic Records November 1969; Recorded by Mike Bobak in the Morgan Studios in Willesden, London.
- Time Is of No Consequence CD, World Wide Records, a division of SPM (Berlin) SPM-WWR-CD-0020
