= Lynette Diaz =

American singer (born 1969)

- Born: Josephine Lynette Diaz; Colorado, United States
- Genres: Folk rock, acoustic
- Occupations: Singer, songwriter
- Years active: 2008–present

Lynette Diaz (born 1969) is an American-born singer-songwriter living in Wellington, New Zealand. Her song "Living Before Dying" was awarded an Honorable Mention at the 2008 Peacedriven Songwriting Contest and also at the 12th Annual Unisong Songwriting Competition.

== Early life ==
Diaz, who is of Mexican descent, was born in Colorado, United States. She subsequently attended school in New Mexico where she graduated in 1987.

== Career in music ==
I know I’m a songwriter first, and the guitar is the instrument that brings the words alive.

— Lynette Diaz, interview with Heather Miller

Diaz released her first CD Lyrics in My Head in 2008. The album received critical acclaim and was added to radio playlists. Diaz performed and promoted the album in New Zealand, and also in the United States.

One song, "Living Before Dying", was lifted from the album and entered in the 2008 Peacedriven Songwriting Contest. Facing more than 400 entrants, Diaz was awarded an Honorable Mention. The same song was also entered in the social/political song category at the 12th Annual Unisong Songwriting Contest. Once again, "Living Before Dying" was awarded an Honorable Mention.

Diaz also took time out from recording her album to perform at a charity event to raise funds for the RSPCA.

Among her many influences, Diaz cites Patty Griffin, Carole King and Brandi Carlile. Her next release will include a tribute to American poet Emily Dickinson.

Diaz previously hosted the New Zealand radio program FemAcoustica on Plains FM 96.9.

In 2019, Diaz was awarded an inaugural Women's Fund Award by the Christchurch Foundation, in recognition of her fostering of women empowerment.

In 2026, Diaz and other musicians formed the group The Hummingbirds.

== Videography ==
- "Ticket to Ride" / "You've Got to Hide Your Love Away"
