= Josefus =

American rock band

- Also known as: Come
- Origin: Houston, Texas, United States
- Genres: Psychedelic rock, hard rock, blues rock, southern rock
- Years active: 1969–2024
- Labels: P-Vine Records, Hi Horse Records, Indigo, Hookah, Josefus, Paradise lost, Akarma Records, Sundazed Music, Dandelion
- Past members: Pete Bailey; Dave Mitchell; Ray Turner; Doug Tull; Phillip White; Leesa Harrington-Squyres; Jerry Ontiberez; Mark Weathers

Josefus was an American rock band from Houston, Texas, United States, who have been credited as "one of the first models for the blunt sound of Texas hard rock and heavy metal." They were also mentioned in an article in Classic Rock titled "The Lost Pioneers of Heavy Metal".

Band members Dave Mitchell and Ray Turner originally played together in a band in high school called Rip West. Along with Doug Tull, the two recorded a demo titled "I Love You." The group changed its name to Josefus when vocalist Pete Bailey joined the band. Phillip White, the band's second lead guitarist, left the band in 1969.

They recorded an album in Phoenix, Arizona, during December 1969 with producer Jim Musil, and for a short while performed under the name Come. Their next album, Dead Man, was recorded in March 1970. Josefus performed its last concert in Houston, Texas, at an auto show, though the group would later reunite in the late 1970s. In 1978, they reunited with drummer Jerry Ontiberez. They recorded four singles that were released on the Hookah label ("Slave Of Fear", "Let Me Move You", "Hard Luck", and "Wheels"). In 1990, Josefus once again reunited. Doug Tull was found hanged in a jail cell in Austin, Texas. So they joined forces with drummer Leesa Harrington-Squyres and recorded Son Of Deadman on Paradise Lost Records. This line-up has performed a handful of shows over the past two decades, one of which was recorded and released - Halloween 2004. In 2011, bassist Ray Turner, suffered a stroke which rendered him unable to play. Mark Weathers was brought back to the band, after two decades, to take over for Turner.

Josefus performed twice during 2011 and plan to continue performing regionally when Harrington-Squyres is available. Pete Bailey died on April 27, 2024, in Pasadena, Texas.

== Discography ==
=== Studio and live albums ===
- Get Off My Case (1969)
- Dead Man (1970)
- Josefus (1970)
- Son of Dead Man (1990)
- Dead Man Alive (2002)
- Halloween 2004 Live (2005)

=== Compilation albums ===
- Dead Man/Get Off My Case (1999)
- Dead Box (2003)

== See also ==
- Josephus Jewish Roman historian
