= More Today Than Yesterday (album) =

Studio album by Spiral Starecase
- Released: May 19, 1969
- Recorded: 1968–1969
- Genre: Pop rock
- Length: 27:48
- Label: Columbia 9852
- Producer: Sonny Knight

Singles from More Today Than Yesterday
- 1. "More Today Than Yesterday"/"Broken-Hearted Man" Released: January 7, 1969; 2. "No One for Me to Turn To"/"Sweet Little Thing" Released: July 29, 1969

Professional ratings
Review scores
Source	Rating
Allmusic	2/5 stars

More Today Than Yesterday is the only album by Spiral Starecase, released in 1969. It reached No. 79 on the Billboard Top LPs chart.

Two singles were released from the album: "More Today Than Yesterday" reached No. 12 on the Billboard Hot 100 and "No One for Me to Turn To" reached No. 52.

== Track listing ==
1. "More Today Than Yesterday" – 2:56 (Pat Upton)
2. "Broken-Hearted Man" – 3:02 (Pat Upton)
3. "For Once in My Life" – 3:00 (Ron Miller/Orlando Murden)
4. "This Guy's in Love with You" – 3:30 (Burt Bacharach/Hal David)
5. "Sweet Little Thing" – 2:29 (Pat Upton)
6. "Proud Mary" – 2:40 (John Fogerty)
7. "The Thought of Loving You" – 3:00 (David White)
8. "Our Day Will Come" – 2:46 (Bob Hilliard/Mort Garson)
9. "No One for Me to Turn To" – 2:31 (Pat Upton)
10. "Since I Don't Have You" – 2:39 (The Skyliners/Joseph Rock/Lennie Martin)
11. "Judas to the Love We Knew" – 2:33 (Pat Upton)

== Charts ==
Chart (1969)	Peak position
Billboard	79

Singles

Year	Single	Chart	Position
1969	"More Today Than Yesterday"	Billboard Hot 100	12
1969	"More Today Than Yesterday"	Cashbox	7
1969	"More Today Than Yesterday"	Canada	6
1969	"No One for Me to Turn To"	Billboard Hot 100	52
