= Elonkorjuu =

Finnish progressive rock band

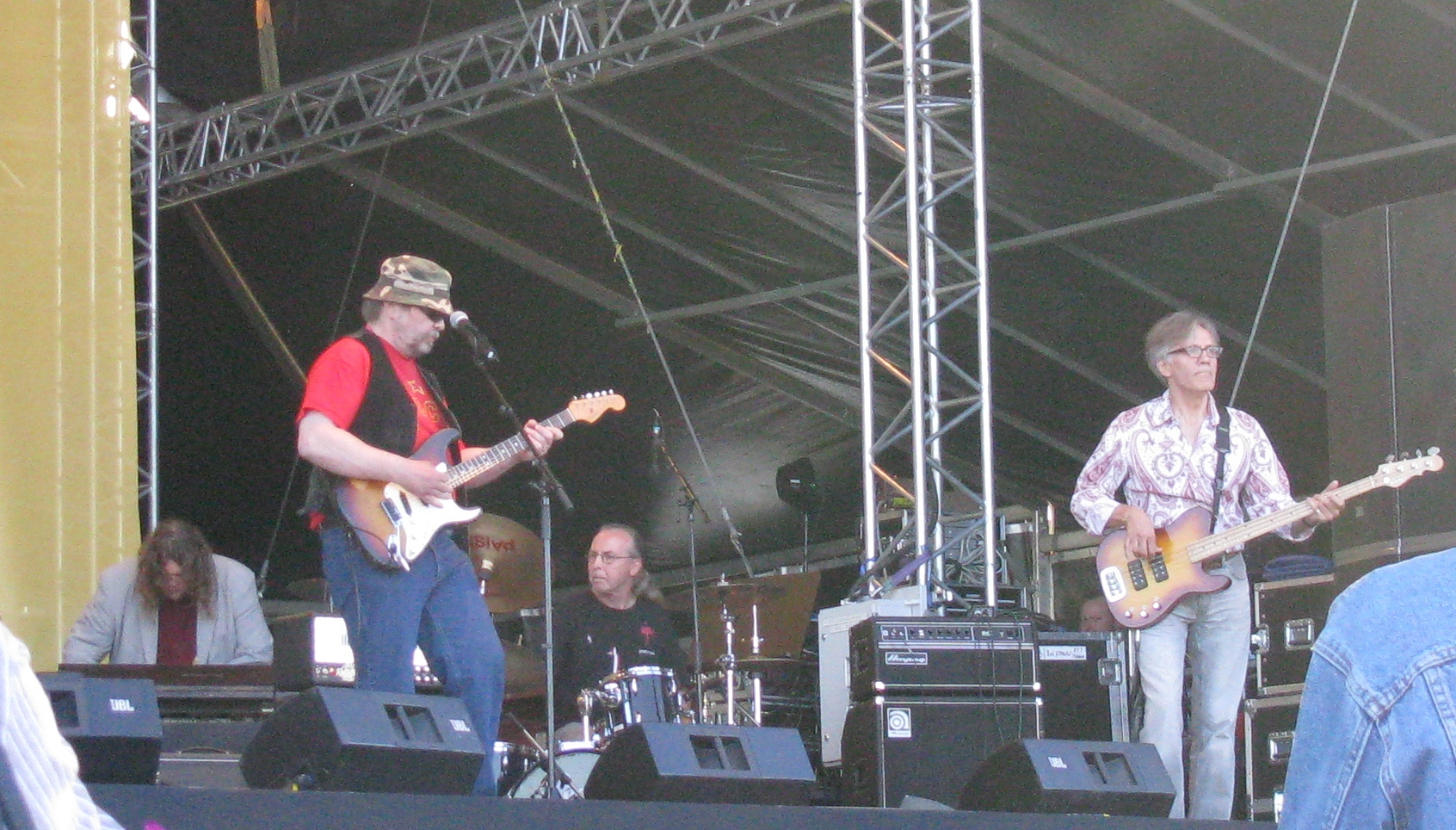
- Elonkorjuu in 2008.

Background information
- Origin: Pori, Finland
- Genres: Hard rock, blues-rock, jazz-rock, progressive rock
- Years active: 1969–1978; 2003–present
- Labels: Touch, RCA, EMI
- Members: Jukka Syrenius; Veli-Pekka Pessi; Zoltán Kárpáti; Jussi Reunamäki; Jari Perkiömäki

Elonkorjuu is a Finnish progressive rock band formed in 1969. It was first active until 1978 and re-established in 2003.

== History ==
Elonkorjuu was founded in the western Finnish city of Pori in the autumn of 1969. A year later the band was awarded with the second place in the 1970 Finnish Rock Championship contest and was signed by EMI. Elonkorjuu released their debut album Harvest Time in 1972. Today the original pressing is considered the most expensive Finnish vinyl album with a price up to € 1,500. It was re-released as a CD in 2002. During the 1970s Elonkorjuu was often featured in the major Finnish music festivals such as Ruisrock and Pori Jazz.

In 1978 the band released their second album Flying High, Running Fast under the name Harvest, which is an English translation of Elonkorjuu. The album was released by RCA Records and Elonkorjuu's goal was an international breakthrough, but the band finally split instead. The guitarist Jukka Syrenius moved to Norway and released several albums with his new group Jukka Syrenius Band, also featuring some international musicians like the American drummer Clifford Jarvis, the South African bassist Johnny Dyani, and the Norwegian keyboardist Haakon Graf.

Elonkorjuu was formed again in 2003 and the following year the band released their third studio album. In December 2009 Elonkorjuu played a 40th anniversary concert in Pori Theatre. It was later released as a double live album. In 2012 EMI released a 4-CD boxed set including almost every track the band has ever recorded. The box also includes rare live material from the 1970s. Today the guitarist Jukka Syrenius and bass player Veli-Pekka Pessi are the only original members of the band. The present line-up features the Hungarian-born drummer Zoltán Kárpáti, keyboardist Jussi Reunamäki, and the saxophonist Jari Perkiömäki, who holds a Doctor of Music degree in jazz music from the Sibelius Academy.

== Band members ==
- Jukka Syrenius – guitar, vocals
- Veli-Pekka Pessi – bass guitar
- Zoltán Kárpáti – drums
- Jussi Reunamäki – keyboards
- Jari Perkiömäki – saxophone

== Discography ==
=== Studio albums ===
- Harvest Time (1972)
- Flyin' High, Runnin' Fast (1978)
- Scumbag (2004)

=== Live albums ===
- Scumbag Goes to Theatre (2010)

=== Compilations ===
- Seasons (2012)
