= It's The Dubliners =

Compilation album by The Dubliners
- Released: 1969
- Genre: Irish folk
- Label: Hallmark

The Dubliners chronology
At Home with The Dubliners (1969)	It's The Dubliners (1969)	A Drop of The Dubliners (1969)

It's The Dubliners is a compilation album released by Hallmark, containing tracks from The Dubliners' early albums and EPs released on the Transatlantic label.

== Track listing ==
=== Side One ===
1. "Master McGrath"
2. "Walking in the Dew" (mistitled as "Waltzing in the Dew")
3. "The Cook in the Kitchen"
4. "Boulavogue"
5. "Reels - Sligo Maid/Colonel Rodney"

=== Side Two ===
1. "Peggy Lettermore"
2. "Preab San Ól" (title wrongly given as 'Ragman's Ball')
3. "I'll Tell Me Ma"
4. "The Mason's Apron"
5. "The Woman from Wexford"
