= Pat Upton (singer) =

American singer (1940–2016)

- Born: Patrick Neal Upton; August 5, 1940; Geraldine, Alabama, U.S.
- Died: July 27, 2016 (aged 75) Guntersville, Alabama, U.S.
- Genres: Pop
- Occupations: Singer; songwriter
- Instrument: Vocals
- Years active: 1964-2016
- Labels: Columbia
- Formerly of: Spiral Starecase

Pat Upton (August 5, 1940 – July 27, 2016) was an American singer, songwriter and guitarist with the band Spiral Starecase. He was the songwriter of, and lead vocalist on, their 1969 gold-selling single "More Today Than Yesterday", which peaked at #12 on the Billboard Hot 100. The song has been covered by Sonny & Cher, Diana Ross, Andy Williams, Lena Horne, Patti Austin, and Goldfinger.

After Spiral Starecase disbanded in 1971, Upton relocated to Los Angeles, where he worked as a session musician and then a band member for Ricky Nelson. Upton was noted as having an exceptionally high voice for a man. On December 30, 1985, after a performance at Upton's Guntersville, Alabama club PJ's Alley, Nelson asked Upton to accompany him on a flight to Dallas, Texas, but Upton declined due to business obligations. The flight crashed, killing Nelson, Nelson's fiancée Helen, and five members of Nelson's band.

== Personal life ==
Born August 5, 1940 to Ernest and Elva Upton, Pat was one of four children. Upton lived with his wife, former model Lynn Upton, in Guntersville, and they had three daughters and a son; he was a grandfather of six. He died in his hometown of Guntersville, Alabama on July 27, 2016, at age 75.

== Discography ==
Solo

- Then and Now - 1995

With Rick Nelson

- Playing to Win - backing vocals - 1981

With Juice Newton

- Well Kept Secret - backing vocals - 1978
- Take Heart - backing vocals - 1979
