= A Drop of The Dubliners =

Compilation album by The Dubliners
- Released: 1969
- Genre: Irish folk
- Label: Major Minor

The Dubliners chronology
It's The Dubliners (1969)	A Drop of The Dubliners (1969)	Revolution (1970)

A Drop of The Dubliners is a compilation album by The Dubliners, released by Major Minor label as their contract with them ended. It consisted of tracks already available on the previous Major Minor releases, with the exception of the previously unavailable "Lock Up Your Daughters", a very rare track featuring a lead vocal shared by Ronnie Drew and Luke Kelly.

== Track listing ==
=== Side one ===
1. "Seven Drunken Nights"
2. "The Black Velvet Band"
3. "Muirsheen Durkin"
4. "Carolan's Concerto"
5. "Whiskey in the Jar"
6. "Maloney Wants a Drink"
7. "Never Wed an Old Man"

=== Side two ===
1. "Weila Waile"
2. "Quare Bungle Rye"
3. "Irish Navy"
4. "Donkey Reel"
5. "Old Alarm Clock"
6. "The Rising of the Moon"
7. "Lock Up Your Daughters"
