= Truth and Janey =

American rock band

- Origin: Cedar Rapids, Iowa, United States
- Genres: Hard rock, psychedelic rock, blues rock, acid rock, heavy metal
- Years active: 1969–1976, 1977–1978
- Past members: BillyLee Janey; Denis Bunce; Steve Bock; John Fillingsworth

Truth and Janey was an American rock band from Iowa. It took its name from Jeff Beck's Truth album and member Billy Janey's last name. The group was influenced by such power trios as Cream and The Jimi Hendrix Experience. The band toured with Leslie West and performed a music festival with Blue Öyster Cult. They were inducted into the Iowa Rock 'n Roll Hall of Fame in 2005.

== History ==
=== Formation ===
The group formed in 1969 originally with drummer John Fillingsworth. In roughly one year he was replaced by Denis Bunce. In 1972 they released their debut, a 7-inch 45 rpm, "Midnight Horsemen" backed with a cover of the Rolling Stones song, "Under My Thumb" on the Sound Communications label. The following year they released "Straight Eight Pontiac" (by Sonny Boy Williamson II) and "Around and Around" (by Chuck Berry) on their own Driving Wheel label. By 1976 they had recorded No Rest for the Wicked on the Montross label, which sold only 1,000 copies upon its original release.

=== Disbandment ===
During the later half of the 1970s they disbanded several times. Bassist Steve Bock eventually joined a group called 'Nowhere Fast'. BillyLee Janey would go on to release several solo albums, and Bunce left the music business completely.

== Discography ==
- 1976 - No Rest for the Wicked
- 1977 - Just a Little Bit of Magic
- 1988 - Live 4/8/76 (2-LP)
- 2003 - Erupts! reissue of Live 4/8/76
- 2016 - Topeka Jam (2-LP)
