= Persephassa (Xenakis) =

Composition by Iannis Xenakis

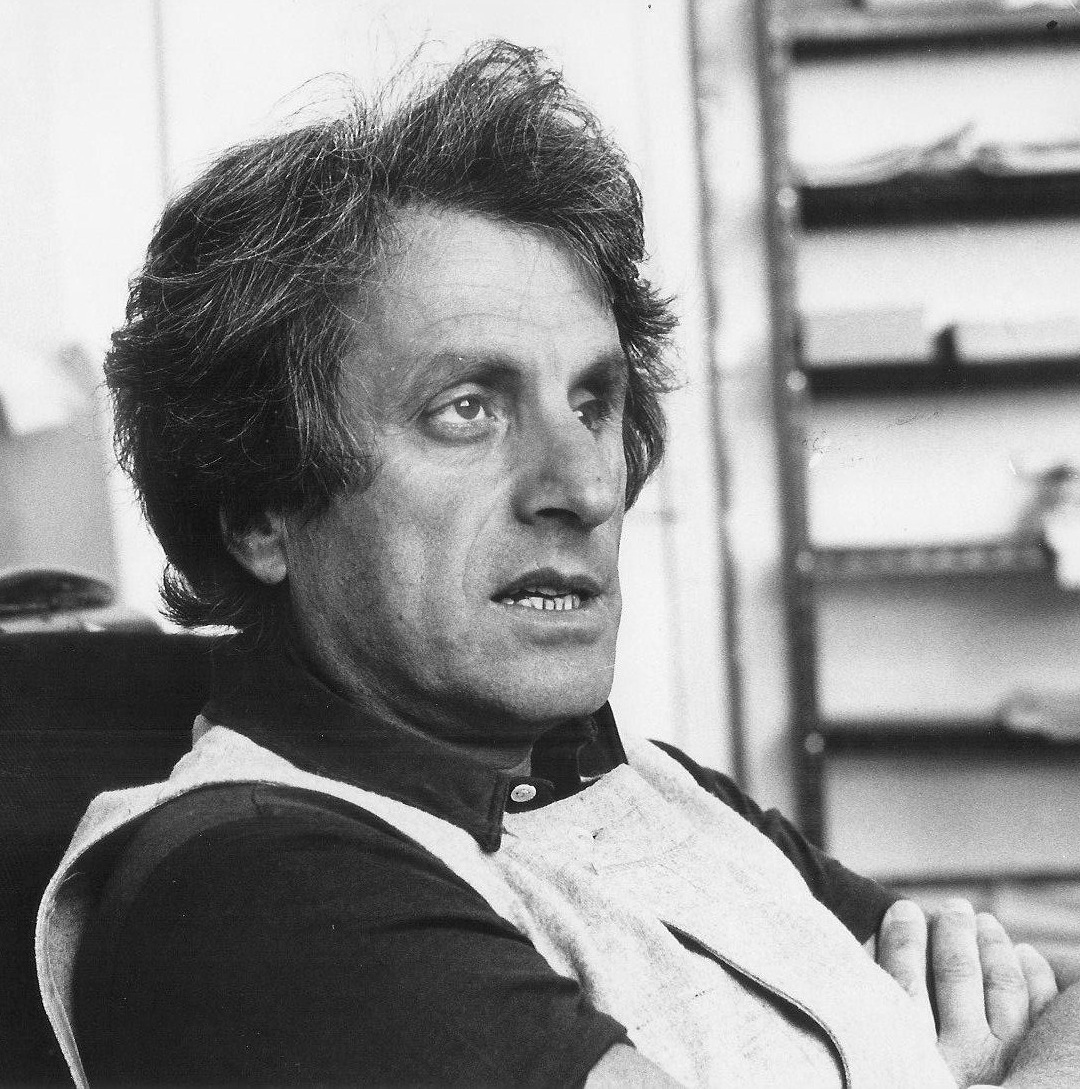
Iannis Xenakis in his Paris studio, c. 1970

Persephassa is a piece for six percussionists composed by Iannis Xenakis in 1969. The piece was commissioned jointly by the Office de Radiodiffusion Télévision Française (ORTF) and the Shiraz Arts Festival (presided by the queen consort of Persia, Farah Pahlavi), held at the historic site of Persepolis. The title is one of the variant names of the goddess Persephone / Proserpina, and also refers to the names "Perseus", "Perceval", and "Persepolis". It was performed in its premiere by Les Percussions de Strasbourg (France) for whom it was written.

== Composition ==
Persephassa gains much of its effect from having the six percussionists distributed around the audience. The treatment of space as a musical parameter is one of the most important preoccupations of Xenakis' music, particularly in his works of the mid-to-late 1960s. (See, for example, Terretektorh (1966), which "distributes the eighty-eight musicians in quasi-stochastic fashion in a circular space around the conductor, with the audience being seated amid the musicians.") The dramatic impact of utilizing the performance space in this manner is evident in many passages throughout the piece in which accents or imitative rhythms are passed around the ensemble. At one point, "Xenakis creates an enormous accelerando, building up as many as six layers of spiraling patterns swirling around the listeners. The tempo of that passage winds up to 360 beats per minute, with one complete rotation of rolled accents around the six players every second... these mesmerizing patterns are enhanced by isolated dynamic accents and by interruptions of silence or stochastic clouds of percussive sonorities."

The percussionists use a wide range of instruments and sound effects during the piece, including sirens, maracas, and pebbles, along with an arsenal of drums, wood blocks (simantras), cymbals, and gongs.

In 2010, the Make Music New York festival presented a performance of Persephassa on and around Central Park Lake in New York City, with audience members listening from rowboats.

Pléïades is another Xenakis composition for six percussionists. Composed in 1978, it was commissioned by Les Percussions de Strasbourg.
