= Vickie Jones =

American singer and impersonator

Mary Jane Jones (c. 1942–2000), known professionally as Vickie Jones, was an American singer who became famous in 1969 for impersonating Aretha Franklin.

Jones was born in Virginia and first sang with the Great Gate, a touring Baptist church choir led by the Reverend Billie Lee. A single mother of four children, Jones struggled to make ends meet, and sometimes performed in local nightclubs for $10 per night. Jones idolized Aretha Franklin, who was the same age and had also got her start in a church choir, and consciously imitated not only her voice but her physical appearance. When Lee discovered that his star singer was moonlighting in nightclubs, he was initially worried, but decided in the end not to intervene.

At a January 1969 nightclub engagement in Richmond, Vickie shared the bill with Lavell Hardy, whose record "Don't Lose Your Groove" had reached Number 42 on the Cashbox singles chart. Hardy was impressed by her close vocal and physical resemblance to Franklin, and hatched a scheme to profit by the similarity. He convinced her to come to Melbourne, Florida to perform six shows for $1000, supposedly as the opening act for Franklin. When she arrived in Florida, she learned that she would actually be impersonating Franklin herself. Jones initially refused, but Hardy threatened to throw her "in the bay" if she didn't go along with the scheme.

Franklin's legal team became aware that an impersonator was performing in Florida under her name, and called the Florida authorities to expose the hoax. Jones appealed to the Ocala prosecutor, who decided that she was an innocent victim of Hardy. She was asked to sing during the trial, and the judge reasoned that she sounded so much like Franklin that the audience had not in fact been defrauded.

Two weeks after her arrest, Jones shared a stage with Duke Ellington, who was touring Florida at the time and was impressed by her abilities. He felt that Jones should break away from the Aretha Franklin image and develop her own persona. For a while Jones continued to tour under her own name, and enjoyed enough success that a singer in Richmond pretended to be Vickie Jones. However, after a year of touring she decided to quit show business in order to care for her four children.
