= The Open Mind (band) =

British psychedelic rock group (1968–1973)

- 1969 promotional material

Background information
- Also known as: The Drag Set
- Origin: London, England
- Genres: Psychedelic rock; freakbeat; garage rock
- Years active: 1968–1973
- Label: Philips
- Members: Mike Brancaccio; Timothy du Feu; Phil Fox; Ray Nye; Terry Martin

The Open Mind was an English psychedelic rock band formed in London, and active in the 1960s and 1970s.

== Overview ==
The band was formed in 1963 by four musicians from Putney, South West London. Initially named The Apaches and formed by Tim du Feu, Mike Brancaccio and Philip Fox and their friend Ray Nye. Nye left in 1965 and another friend, Terry Schindler, joined instead. The band became The Drag Set, who released a little-known single in February 1967, "Day and Night" / "Get Out of My Way". Shortly thereafter, they changed their name to The Open Mind and in July 1969 released a self-titled LP which has since become a highly sought-after collectible. The cover artwork featured members of the band emerging from the head of an ancient Greek statue (the Charioteer of Delphi). The band, however, is best known for its druggy August 1969 single, "Magic Potion", which did not appear on the album. According to Terry Schindler, the track was banned by the BBC due to its drug references.

The Open Mind disbanded in 1973; its members wanted to move into jazz-influenced music, but The Open Mind was too well known as a psychedelic band. The band members (minus Phil Fox) went on to form Armada, which lasted about three years but did not release any recorded material.

Despite their paucity of recorded material, The Open Mind have proven to be influential in the psychedelic rock genre, their single "Magic Potion" having been covered by bands such as The Seers, Sun Dial and The Damned.

== Band members ==
- Mike Bran, a.k.a. Mike Brancaccio – lead guitar, vocals, piano (born 17 April 1946, Rome, Italy; died 2022)
- Timothy du Feu – bass guitar (born 31 May 1944, Malvern, Worcestershire, England)
- Philip Fox – drums (born 26 August 1946, Westminster, South West London)
- Ray Nye – guitar, vocals
- Terry Martin, a.k.a. Terry Schindler – guitar, vocals (born 26 August 1945, Holborn, West Central London)

== Discography ==
=== Singles ===
- "Horses and Chariots" b/w "Before My Time" (Philips BF 1790) May 1969
- "Magic Potion" b/w "Cast a Spell" (Philips BF 1805) August 1969

The Drag Set

- "Day and Night" b/w "Get Out of My Way" 7" single (Go AJ 11405) May 1967

=== Album ===
- The Open Mind LP (Philips 7893) (July 1969)

The Open Mind was reissued on CD on the Acme Records and Second Battle labels. The two non-LP songs from the single are included as bonus tracks.
