= The Ballad of Persse O'Reilly =

The Ballad of Persse O'Reilly is a song in book one of James Joyce's novel Finnegans Wake (pages 44.24 to 47.32), where the protagonist H.C.E. has been brought low by a rumour which begins to spread across Dublin, apparently concerning a sexual trespass involving two girls in Phoenix Park; however details of HCE's transgression change with each retelling of events. Most of chapters 1.2 through 1.4 follow the progress of this rumour, starting with HCE's encounter with "a cad with a pipe." The cad asks the time, but HCE misunderstands it as either an accusation or a proposition, and incriminates himself by denying rumours the cad has not yet heard. (Note: Joyce expresses HCE's confusion by spelling the cad's Gaelic phonetically, making it look like a suggestive English phrase.)

These rumors spread across Dublin, increasing as they go, until they finally become a song – penned by the shady character Hosty or frosty Hosty (Francis J. Child) – called "The Ballad of Persse O'Reilly", described as a "scurrilous rann against H. C. Earwicker, which recounts the All-Father's fall from grace."

Eventually, HCE becomes so paranoid he goes into hiding, where he is besieged and reviled by a visiting American at the closed gate of HCE's pub, who is looking for drink after closing time.

== Text and style ==
The poem is written in the language of Finnegans Wake, which can be considered a 'Babylonish Dialect' in terms used by Samuel Johnson in describing Milton's language in Paradise Lost. The title is in the guise of an Irish name (Persse was Lady Gregory's maiden name) but perce-oreille is French for "earwig", the earwig being a theme in the text.

The earwig reference does invite another pun which is that of insect/incest, which links to other themes in Finnegans Wake.

Mr Eliot has pointed out the parallel between the blind and musically gifted Milton and the blind and musically gifted Joyce. Joyce's blindness or near-blindness forced him away from the visual to the musical and emotional associations of words, and his linguistic erudition supplied another element for the construction of the language of Finnegans Wake.

== Recordings ==
An abridged version known as "Humpty Dumpty" has been recorded by:

- The Dubliners, sung by Ronnie Drew on At Home With the Dubliners, 1969 – listen here on YouTube
- Frank Harte in Se Mo Laoch – Frank Harte, a biopic documentary

== See also ==
- Finnegans Wake
