= Harvest Time (Elonkorjuu album) =

Studio album by Elonkorjuu
- Released: 1972
- Studio: Finnvox Studios
- Genre: Progressive rock, hard rock, psychedelic rock
- Label: EMI, Parlophone
- Producer: Chrisse Johansson

Elonkorjuu chronology
Harvest Time (1972)	Flying High, Running Fast (1978)

Professional ratings
Review scores
Source	Rating
AllMusic	3/5 stars
Soundi	4/5 stars

Harvest Time is the debut album from Finnish progressive rock band Elonkorjuu, originally released in 1972. It was re-issued as a CD formation in 2002. The album is inspired by groups like Cream and Free with more progressive style.

The original pressing of Harvest Time is considered the most expensive Finnish vinyl album with a price up to €1,500.

== Track listing ==
- All music and arrangements by Jukka Syrenius, Eero Rantasila, Veli-Pekka Pessi and Heikki Lajunen. All lyrics by Esko Saarinen. Published by IMUDICO

Side one

1. "Unfeeling" – 3:23
2. "Swords" – 4:03
3. "Captain" – 3:42
4. "Praise to Our Basement" – 4:44
5. "Future" – 3:56

Side two

1. "Hey Hunter" – 3:41
2. "The Ocean Song" – 3:17
3. "Old Man's Dream" – 4:44
4. "Me and My Friend" – 4:02
5. "A Little Rocket Song" – 4:04

== Personnel ==
- Heikki Lajunen – vocals, guitars, bass, piano
- Jukka Syrenius – guitar, vocals
- Ilkka Poijärvi – organ, flute, additional guitars
- Veli-Pekka Pessi – bass guitar
- Eero Rantasila – drums
