= Spiral Starecase =

American pop band

- Origin: Sacramento, California, United States
- Genres: Pop
- Years active: 1964–1982
- Label: Columbia
- Past members: Pat Upton; Harvey Kaye; Dick Lopes; Bobby Raymond; Vinny Parello; Mike Caschera; Al Sebay; Gene Austin; Mark Barrett

The Spiral Starecase was an American pop band, best known for its 1969 single "More Today Than Yesterday". Hailing from Sacramento, California, United States, the band was recognizable for its horns and lead singer/guitarist Pat Upton's voice.

Beginning life under the name The Fydallions, the group first formed in 1964, changing their name to Spiral Starecase several years later. In addition to Upton the band included Harvey Kaye (organ), Dick Lopes (saxophone), Bobby Raymond (bass guitar), Gene Austin (bass guitar), Vinny Parello (drums), Mark Barrett (drums), Al Sebay (electric guitar), and Mike Caschera.

== History ==
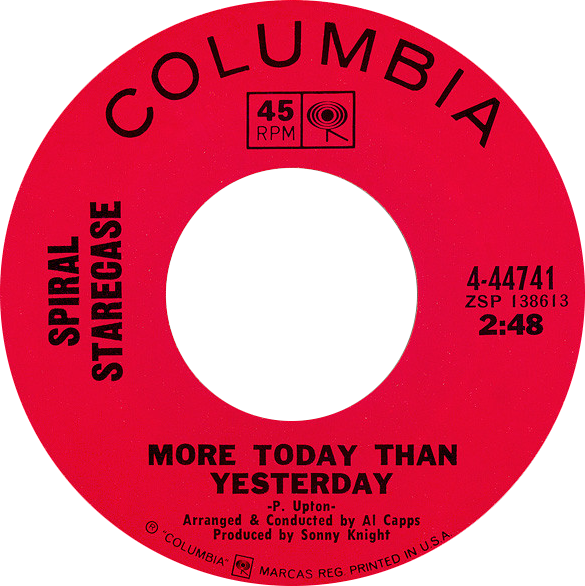
More Today Than Yesterday

The group evolved from a four-piece instrumental group called the Fydallions, which formed in 1964 in Sacramento, California, for an Air Force talent contest. After leaving the Air Force, the band went on the road, playing five-hour lounge jobs on the Las Vegas circuit. The Fydallions, by then a quintet consisting of Dick Lopes (saxophone), Bobby Raymond (bass guitar), Harvey Kaye (keyboards), Vinnie Parello (drums), and Pat Upton (guitar and lead vocals), were noticed by the A&R representative for Columbia Records, Gary Usher, while they were working in El Monte, California. Columbia signed the band, but insisted that they change their name. The band was renamed after the movie The Spiral Staircase, but with a deliberate misspelling.

Their first two singles, produced by Gary Usher and released in 1968, were regional successes in markets like Phoenix, Arizona. Although they were not featured on an album, these two songs, along with a third single released that same year, "Baby What I Mean", would later be featured on the compilation The Very Best of the Spiral Starecase.

At this point, Sonny Knight was brought in to produce their first album. Usher had encouraged Upton to write original material for the group, and Upton had written "More Today Than Yesterday," while the band was working the Flamingo Sky Room in Las Vegas.

"More Today Than Yesterday" peaked at number 1 on the KHJ Boss Radio 30 on April 23, 1969, at number 12 on the U.S. Billboard Hot 100 and number seven on the Cash Box Top 100. It is ranked as the 50th biggest U.S. hit of 1969. In Canada, it reached number six and is ranked as the 63rd biggest hit of the year. The group soon released their debut album, titled after the song along with a few more singles including the follow-up, "She's Ready", and "No One for Me to Turn To" after signing with Columbia.

The group recorded many songs for Columbia Records including several singles. None of those however could match the success of "More Today Than Yesterday", and the group disbanded approximately 18 months after the chart topping song was released. Poor management, squabbles over finances and a lawsuit also contributed to the original line-up's decision to call it quits.

Upton went back to Los Angeles to work as a session musician, eventually working with Ricky Nelson.

Kaye returned to Las Vegas and reformed the band in the mid 1970s. That line-up also featured Mike Caschera (a.k.a. Michael Anthony) (lead vocals), Al Sebay (guitar), Gene Austin (electric bass), and Mark Barrett (drums). The band toured extensively and played every major venue in the United States, Canada, and Mexico for the remainder of the 1970s through the mid-1980s often with a full horn section to replicate the sound of their biggest hits.

Raymond died in 1984. Kaye died on August 17, 2008 at age 69. Upton died on July 27, 2016, aged 75.

== Legacy ==
"More Today Than Yesterday" has been covered by, among others, Sonny and Cher, Diana Ross, and Goldfinger, and was featured in the 1991 film My Girl, on the soundtrack of The Waterboy in 1998, and in an episode of Ally McBeal entitled "Silver Bells" and is featured in the film Nobody 2 (2025).

== Discography ==
=== Albums ===
Year	Album	Billboard 200	Record label
1969	More Today Than Yesterday	79	Columbia Records

=== Compilation albums ===
Year	Album	Record label
1995	The Very Best of Spiral Starecase	Taragon Records
1997	Our Day Will Come Spiral Starecase Revisited	Sony Music Entertainment Philippines
2000	More Today Than Yesterday/Spiral Starecase	Sony Japan
2003	Spiral Starecase: The Complete Columbia Recordings	Taragon Records
2004	Priceless Collection Spiral Starecase More Today Than Yesterday	Sony Music Entertainment
2006	Our Day Will Come	Columbia Records
2006	From the Original Masters Spiral Starecase Our Day Will Come Revisited	Sony Music Entertainment

=== Singles ===
Year	Title	Peak chart positions			Record label	B-side	Album
Year	Title	US BB	US CB	CAN	Record label	B-side	Album
1968	"Baby What I Mean"	111	–	–	Columbia Records	"Makin' My Mind Up"	
1968	"I'll Run"	–	–	–	Columbia Records	"Inside, Outside, Upside Down"	
1969	"More Today Than Yesterday"	12	7	6	Columbia Records	"Broken-Hearted Man"	More Today Than Yesterday
1969	"No One for Me to Turn To"	52	42	38	Columbia Records	"Sweet Little Thing"	More Today Than Yesterday
1969	"She's Ready"	72	–	–	Columbia Records	"Judas to the Love We Knew"	

== See also ==
- List of 1960s one-hit wonders in the United States
