= Granicus (band) =

American hard rock band

- Granicus in 1973

Background information
- Origin: Cleveland, Ohio, U.S.
- Genres: Hard rock, heavy metal, progressive rock
- Years active: 1969–1973, 2016
- Label: RCA
- Past members: Woody Leffel; Wayne Anderson; Allen Pinell; Dale Bedford; Joe Battaglia
- Website: granicusmusic.com

Granicus was an American hard rock band formed in 1969 in Cleveland. The group was known for their mix of heavy blues rock, progressive rock, psychedelic rock and heavy metal.

Initially formed by guitarist Al Pinell and drummer Joe Battaglia, the group practiced in his home before moving to a Cleveland warehouse to develop what would be their first record. After performing in clubs in Cleveland, and then playing before label bosses, the band were signed by RCA Records on March 15, 1973, and released their eponymous debut album in the same year. The band opened for such performers as Bob Seger, Cactus and Spirit to promote the record, which has since been critically acclaimed in some classic rock circles. Soon after, though, the group disbanded, feeling unsupported by their label and being deserted by their manager.

The group's music was highly influenced by popular bands of the time, including late-60s psychedelic rock artists such as Cream, The Jimi Hendrix Experience and Blue Cheer as well as early-70s hard rock giants, Deep Purple and Led Zeppelin. The band featured two guitars, with bass and drums, and were led by a signature vocal. Lead vocalist Woody Leffel had a high-ranged delivery very similar to Robert Plant, Ian Gillan and Geddy Lee.

Most of the group reunited some 25 plus years later, after finding their album pirated and selling in Europe. In 2009, they released Thieves, Liars and Traitors on an independent label in 2010 from a collection of unreleased material that they had recorded in 1974.

Three members of the original group, Battaglia, Pinell and Bedford, teamed up to record a third album in 2016. They brought in guitarist Artie Cashin, and vocalist Gerry Schultz, as Leffel had opted out. They released the album, Better Days, independently that year. The band were also trying to regain control of their pirated first record in 2016.

== Members ==
Principal members

- Woody Leffel – vocals, acoustic guitar, harmonica
- Wayne Anderson – lead guitar
- Allen Pinell – rhythm guitar
- Dale Bedford – bass guitar
- Joe Battaglia – drums
- Howard Ross - lead guitar

Guest artists on "Thieves, Liars and Traitors"

- Artie Cashin – guitar
- Jesse Rae – vocals

Granicus III, Better Days:

- Gerry Schultz - vocals

== Discography ==
- Granicus (1973)
1. You're In America
2. Bad Talk
3. Twilight
4. Prayer
5. Cleveland Ohio
6. Nightmare
7. When You're Movin'
8. Paradise
- Thieves, Liars and Traitors (2010)
1. Thieves Liars and traitors
2. Space in Time
3. Equator
4. I'm Not Sick
5. Hollywood Star
6. Wizard of Was
7. Taste of Love
8. Slings and Arrows
9. When You're Movin'/Back Seat of My Car/Bad Talk (Live Jam)
- Granicus III, Better Days (2016)
1. Better Days (title track)
2. Southbound
3. Walk Free
4. Living In Darkness
5. On The Road Again
6. Gotta Win Tonight
7. Take Me Back
8. Give And Take
9. Still Wanna Rock It.
