= Billboard Year-End Best Selling Soul Singles of 1970 =

American music chart

This is a list of Billboard magazine's Top Hot Soul Singles of 1970.

No.	Title	Artist(s)
1	"I'll Be There"	The Jackson 5
2	"Love on a Two-Way Street"	The Moments
3	"Signed, Sealed, Delivered I'm Yours"	Stevie Wonder
4	"The Love You Save"	The Jackson 5
5	"Thank You (Falettinme Be Mice Elf Agin)"	Sly and the Family Stone
6	"Rainy Night in Georgia"	Brook Benton
7	"Ball of Confusion (That's What the World Is Today)"	The Temptations
8	"Turn Back the Hands of Time"	Tyrone Davis
9	"Sugar, Sugar" / "Cole, Cooke and Redding"	Wilson Pickett
10	"Express Yourself"	Charles Wright & the Watts 103rd Street Rhythm Band
11	"Steal Away"	Johnnie Taylor
12	"Psychedelic Shack"	The Temptations
13	"It's a Shame"	The Spinners
14	"Call Me"	Aretha Franklin
15	"Patches"	Clarence Carter
16	"Didn't I (Blow Your Mind This Time)"	The Delfonics
17	"Groovy Situation"	Gene Chandler
18	"ABC"	The Jackson 5
19	"I Want You Back"	The Jackson 5
20	"Don't Play That Song (You Lied)"	Aretha Franklin
21	"Get Up (I Feel Like Being a) Sex Machine"	James Brown
22	"The Thrill Is Gone"	B. B. King
23	"Ain't No Mountain High Enough"	Diana Ross
24	"Check Out Your Mind"	The Impressions
25	"War"	Edwin Starr
26	"Up the Ladder to the Roof"	The Supremes
27	"The Bells"	The Originals
28	"Hey There Lonely Girl"	Ruby & the Romantics
29	"O-o-h Child" / "Dear Prudence"	Five Stairsteps
30	"Do the Funky Chicken"	Rufus Thomas
31	"You're the One"	Little Sister
32	"Still Water (Love)"	Four Tops
33	"Somebody's Been Sleeping"	100 Proof (Aged in Soul)
34	"Maybe"	The Three Degrees
35	"Super Bad"	James Brown
36	"Do You See My Love (For You Growing)"	Junior Walker
37	"Stand by Your Man"	Candi Staton
38	"Love Bones"	Johnnie Taylor
39	"It's a New Day"	James Brown
40	"Brother Rapp"	James Brown
41	"Give Me Just a Little More Time"	Chairmen of the Board
42	"Spirit in the Dark" / "The Thrill Is Gone"	The Staple Singers
43	"I Like Your Lovin' (Do You Like Mine?)"	The Chi-Lites
44	"Love Land"	Charles Wright & the Watts 103rd Street Rhythm Band
45	"The Sly, the Slick and the Wicked"	The Lost Generation
46	"Gotta Hold On to This Feeling"	Junior Walker
47	"You Need Love Like I Do (Don't You)"	Gladys Knight & the Pips
48	"To the Other Woman"	Doris Duke
49	"California Girl"	Eddie Floyd
50	"It's All in the Game"	Four Tops

== See also ==
- 1970 in music
- Billboard Year-End Hot 100 singles of 1970
- List of Best Selling Soul Singles number ones of 1970
