= Billboard Year-End Hot 100 singles of 1970 =

Ranking of recorded music

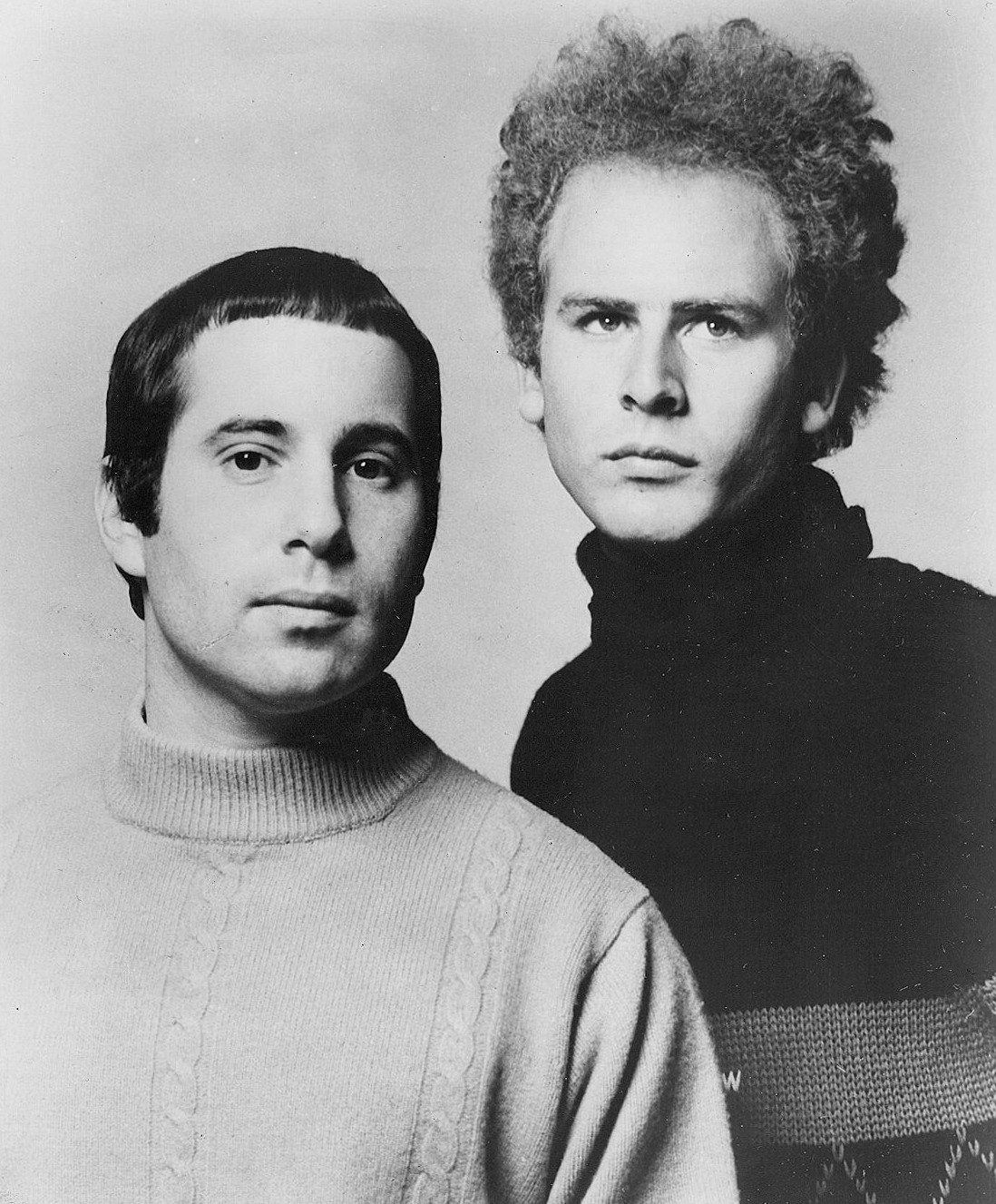
Simon & Garfunkel had two songs on the Year-End Hot 100, including "Bridge Over Troubled Water"

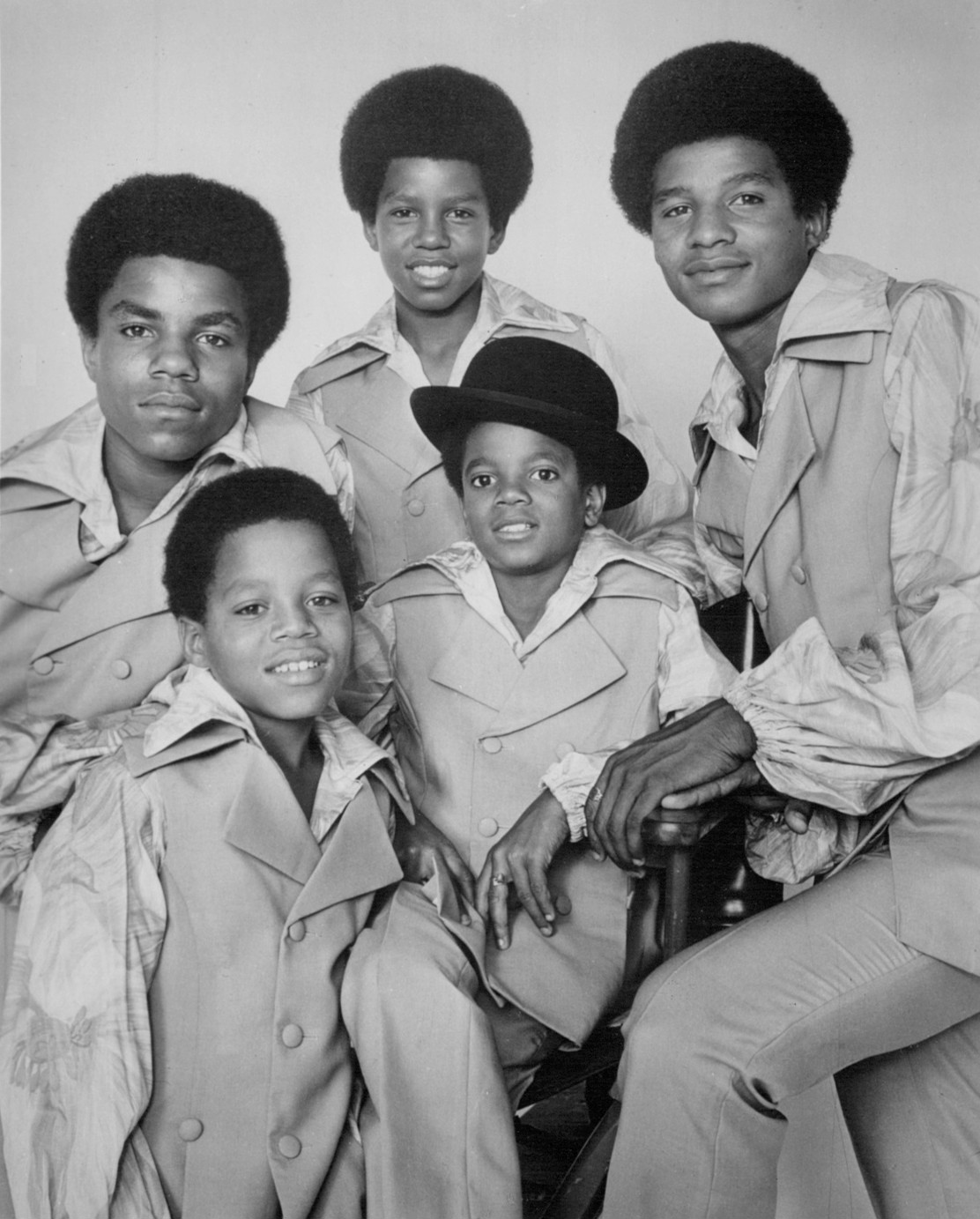
The Jackson 5 had four songs on the Year-End Hot 100, the most of any artist in 1970.

This is a list of Billboard magazine's Top Hot 100 songs of the year 1970. It covers from January 3 to November 28, 1970.

| No. | Title | Artist(s) |
|---|---|---|
| 1 | "Bridge Over Troubled Water" | Simon & Garfunkel |
| 2 | "(They Long to Be) Close to You" | The Carpenters |
| 3 | "American Woman" | The Guess Who |
| 4 | "Raindrops Keep Fallin' on My Head" | B.J. Thomas |
| 5 | "War" | Edwin Starr |
| 6 | "Ain't No Mountain High Enough" | Diana Ross |
| 7 | "I'll Be There" | The Jackson 5 |
| 8 | "Get Ready" | Rare Earth |
| 9 | "Let It Be" | The Beatles |
| 10 | "Band of Gold" | Freda Payne |
| 11 | "Mama Told Me (Not to Come)" | Three Dog Night |
| 12 | "Everything Is Beautiful" | Ray Stevens |
| 13 | "Make It with You" | Bread |
| 14 | "Hitchin' a Ride" | Vanity Fare |
| 15 | "ABC" | The Jackson 5 |
| 16 | "The Love You Save" | The Jackson 5 |
| 17 | "Cracklin' Rosie" | Neil Diamond |
| 18 | "Candida" | Dawn |
| 19 | "Thank You (Falettinme Be Mice Elf Agin)" | Sly & the Family Stone |
| 20 | "Spill the Wine" | Eric Burdon & War |
| 21 | "O-o-h Child" | Five Stairsteps |
| 22 | "Spirit in the Sky" | Norman Greenbaum |
| 23 | "Lay Down (Candles in the Rain)" | Melanie |
| 24 | "Ball of Confusion (That's What the World Is Today)" | The Temptations |
| 25 | "Love on a Two-Way Street" | The Moments |
| 26 | "Which Way You Goin' Billy?" | The Poppy Family |
| 27 | "All Right Now" | Free |
| 28 | "I Want You Back" | The Jackson 5 |
| 29 | "Julie, Do Ya Love Me" | Bobby Sherman |
| 30 | "Green-Eyed Lady" | Sugarloaf |
| 31 | "Signed, Sealed, Delivered I'm Yours" | Stevie Wonder |
| 32 | "Ride Captain Ride" | Blues Image |
| 33 | "Venus" | Shocking Blue |
| 34 | "Instant Karma!" | John Lennon |
| 35 | "Patches" | Clarence Carter |
| 36 | "Lookin' out My Back Door" | Creedence Clearwater Revival |
| 37 | "Rainy Night in Georgia" | Brook Benton |
| 38 | "Something's Burning" | Kenny Rogers & The First Edition |
| 39 | "Give Me Just a Little More Time" | Chairmen of the Board |
| 40 | "Love Grows (Where My Rosemary Goes)" | Edison Lighthouse |
| 41 | "The Long and Winding Road" | The Beatles |
| 42 | "Snowbird" | Anne Murray |
| 43 | "Reflections of My Life" | Marmalade |
| 44 | "Hey There Lonely Girl" | Eddie Holman |
| 45 | "The Rapper" | The Jaggerz |
| 46 | "He Ain't Heavy, He's My Brother" | The Hollies |
| 47 | "Tighter, Tighter" | Alive N Kickin' |
| 48 | "Come and Get It" | Badfinger |
| 49 | "Cecilia" | Simon & Garfunkel |
| 50 | "Love Land" | Charles Wright & the Watts 103rd Street Rhythm Band |
| 51 | "Turn Back the Hands of Time" | Tyrone Davis |
| 52 | "Lola" | The Kinks |
| 53 | "In the Summertime" | Mungo Jerry |
| 54 | "Indiana Wants Me" | R. Dean Taylor |
| 55 | "(I Know) I'm Losing You" | Rare Earth |
| 56 | "Easy Come, Easy Go" | Bobby Sherman |
| 57 | "Express Yourself" | Charles Wright & the Watts 103rd Street Rhythm Band |
| 58 | "Still Water (Love)" | The Four Tops |
| 59 | "Make Me Smile" | Chicago |
| 60 | "The House of the Rising Sun" | Frijid Pink |
| 61 | "25 or 6 to 4" | Chicago |
| 62 | "My Baby Loves Lovin'" | White Plains |
| 63 | "Love or Let Me Be Lonely" | The Friends of Distinction |
| 64 | "United We Stand" | The Brotherhood of Man |
| 65 | "We've Only Just Begun" | The Carpenters |
| 66 | "Arizona" | Mark Lindsay |
| 67 | "Fire and Rain" | James Taylor |
| 68 | "Groovy Situation" | Gene Chandler |
| 69 | "Evil Ways" | Santana |
| 70 | "No Time" | The Guess Who |
| 71 | "Didn't I (Blow Your Mind This Time)" | The Delfonics |
| 72 | "The Wonder of You" | Elvis Presley |
| 73 | "Up Around the Bend" | Creedence Clearwater Revival |
| 74 | "(If You Let Me Make Love To You Then) Why Can't I Touch You?" | Ronnie Dyson |
| 75 | "I Just Can't Help Believing" | B.J. Thomas |
| 76 | "It's a Shame" | The Spinners |
| 77 | "For the Love of Him" | Bobbi Martin |
| 78 | "Mississippi Queen" | Mountain |
| 79 | "I Want to Take You Higher" | Ike & Tina Turner |
| 80 | "The Letter" | Joe Cocker |
| 81 | "Ma Belle Amie" | Tee-Set |
| 82 | "The Bells" | The Originals |
| 83 | "Yellow River" | Christie |
| 84 | "Somebody's Been Sleeping" | 100 Proof (Aged in Soul) |
| 85 | "Vehicle" | The Ides of March |
| 86 | "Gimme Dat Ding" | The Pipkins |
| 87 | "Lay a Little Lovin' on Me" | Robin McNamara |
| 88 | "Up the Ladder to the Roof" | The Supremes |
| 89 | "Travelin' Band" | Creedence Clearwater Revival |
| 90 | "Come Saturday Morning" | The Sandpipers |
| 91 | "Psychedelic Shack" | The Temptations |
| 92 | "Without Love (There Is Nothing)" | Tom Jones |
| 93 | "Are You Ready?" | Pacific Gas & Electric |
| 94 | "Woodstock" | Crosby, Stills, Nash & Young |
| 95 | "I'll Never Fall in Love Again" | Dionne Warwick |
| 96 | "Look What They've Done to My Song Ma" | The New Seekers |
| 97 | "Walk A Mile In My Shoes" | Joe South |
| 98 | "The Thrill Is Gone" | B.B. King |
| 99 | "It's Only Make Believe" | Glen Campbell |
| 100 | "Call Me" | Aretha Franklin |

== See also ==
- 1970 in music
- Billboard Year-End Best Selling Soul Singles of 1970
- List of Billboard Hot 100 number-one singles of 1970
- List of Billboard Hot 100 top-ten singles in 1970
