= Everybody Is a Star =

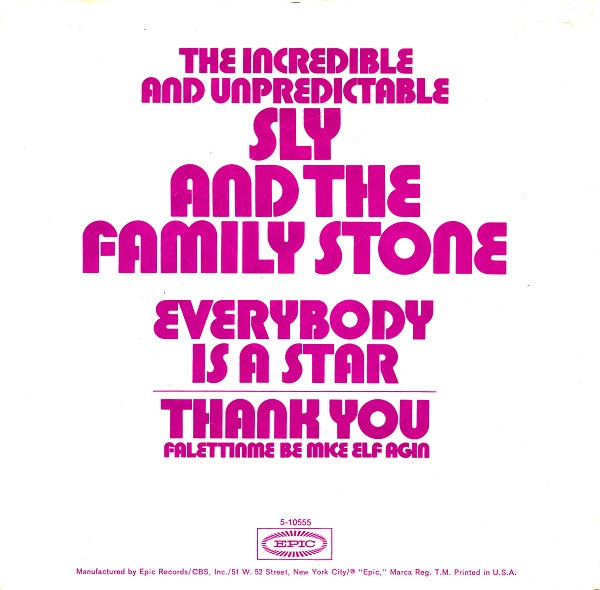
- Back sleeve of the US single

Single by Sly and the Family Stone

from the album Greatest Hits
- A-side: "Thank You (Falettinme Be Mice Elf Agin)"
- Released: December 1969
- Recorded: 1969
- Genre: Soul
- Length: 3:00
- Label: Epic; 5-10555
- Songwriter: Sly Stone
- Producer: Sly Stone

Sly and the Family Stone singles chronology
| "Hot Fun in the Summertime" (1969) | "Thank You (Falettinme Be Mice Elf Agin)" / "Everybody Is a Star" (1969) | "Family Affair" (1971) |

"Everybody Is a Star", released in December 1969, is song written by Sylvester Stewart and recorded by Sly and the Family Stone. The song, released as the B-side to the band's 1970 single "Thank You (Falettinme Be Mice Elf Agin)", reached number one on the Billboard Hot 100 singles chart for two weeks in February 1970 – at a time when chart position for both sides of a single could be measured equally and not independently. "Star" was intended to be included on an in-progress album with "Thank You" and "Hot Fun in the Summertime"; the LP was never completed, and the three tracks were instead included on the band's 1970 Greatest Hits compilation. The single was the final classic-era Family Stone recording; it would be 23 months until the next release, the single "Family Affair" in late 1971.

Sly, his siblings Freddie Stone and Rose Stone, and Larry Graham trade bars for the lead vocal, delivering Sly's assurance that every person is special in their own way. The song with which "Star" originally shared a 7" single, "Thank You (Falettinme Be Mice Elf Agin)", marks the beginning of the Family Stone's second era, during which the music would take on a darker, more funk-based feel.

The song has been covered by several acts, including The Jackson 5, The Pointer Sisters, Gladys Knight & the Pips, Madonna, Fishbone with Gwen Stefani and Family Stone member Rose Stone, and others. The Roots sampled the song for their 2004 single "Star", from their LP The Tipping Point. This version of the song, featuring Roots MC Black Thought commenting on how people attempt to earn fame in the wrong way, was also included on a Family Stone tribute/covers album, Different Strokes by Different Folks, released in July 2005. In 1977, the cast performed the song on an episode of The Brady Bunch Variety Hour.

Stevie Wonder reprend la chanson lors de sa tournée 2025/2026 "Live Songs in the key of life".

== Personnel ==
- Sly Stone – vocals, organ
- Cynthia Robinson – trumpet
- Jerry Martini – tenor saxophone
- Rose Stone – vocals, piano
- Freddie Stone – vocals, guitars
- Larry Graham – vocals, bass
- Greg Errico – drums

== See also ==
- List of Hot 100 number-one singles of 1970 (U.S.)
- List of number-one R&B singles of 1970 (U.S.)
