= Up from Where We've Come =

Book by musician Charles Wright

- Author: Charles Wright
- Publisher: A Million $ Worth of Memories Records
- Publication date: 2015
- Publication place: United States
- Media type: Print
- Pages: 247
- ISBN: 1521116849

Up from Where We've Come is a book by veteran musician Charles Wright who led the Watts 103rd Street Rhythm Band during the 1970s. It covers his early years, battling hardship and racism in America's South through to his future in music.

== Background ==
Told in Wright's own style, it tells of a young boy from a large family that worked on a cotton plantation that was owned by a cruel sharecropper. It covers his childhood years through to his finding fame as a musician.

It gives an intimate account of his family's life and their struggle and having to deal with issues such as racism. It tells what it was like for a black family in Clarksdale, Mississippi, who sharecroppers during the 1940s. It also follows his move to Los Angeles where he would have his musical future.

It was edited by Scott Galloway and published in 2016 by A Million $ Worth of Memories Records.

== Appearances and reviews ==
On February 24, 2016, Wright appeared at LA's Southwest College Black History Month to talk about his book. He was interviewed by Aaron Robinson for Consciousness Magazine where Robinson asked him about the book and he said he was filling link between slavery and sharecropping.

On August 20 that year, he appeared at the Leimert Park Book Fair for its tenth anniversary. Alongside Matty Rich, Wight talked about his book. On May 19, 2018, he was at the William Grant Still Arts Center to sign copies of the book.

The book has had positive ratings at Goodreads.
