= Do Your Thing (Charles Wright & the Watts 103rd Street Rhythm Band song) =

Single by Charles Wright & the Watts 103rd Street Rhythm Band

from the album Together
- B-side: "A Dance, a Kiss and a Song"
- Released: November 1968
- Genre: R&B, funk, funk rock
- Length: 2:50
- Label: Warner Bros.
- Songwriter(s): Charles Wright
- Producer(s): Charles Wright, Fred Smith

Charles Wright & the Watts 103rd Street Rhythm Band singles chronology
"Bottomless" (1968)	"Do Your Thing" (1968)	"Till You Get Enough" (1969)

"Do Your Thing" is a song written by Charles Wright and performed by Charles Wright & the Watts 103rd Street Rhythm Band. It reached #11 on the Billboard Hot 100 and #12 on the R&B chart in 1969. The song was featured on their 1968 album, Together.

The song was produced by Wright and Fred Smith.

The single ranked #47 on Billboard's Year-End Hot 100 singles of 1969.

== Other versions ==
- Mel Brown released a version of the song on his 1970 album, I'd Rather Suck My Thumb.
- Ohio Players released a version of the song on their 1981 album, Ouch!
- King Tee sampled the song on his 1990 album, At Your Own Risk on the song "Do Your Thing".
- Hexstatic released a mix version of the song on their 2002 album, Listen & Learn.

== In popular culture ==
- The song was included in the 1997 film Boogie Nights.
- The political podcast Chapo Trap House used the song prominently in their first post-election episode of 2016.
- UFC fighter Joseph Benavidez uses the song as his walkout music.
