= Express Yourself (N.W.A song) =

Single by N.W.A

from the album Straight Outta Compton
- B-side: "Straight Outta Compton"
- Released: May 1989
- Recorded: 1988
- Studio: Audio Achievements (Torrance, California)
- Genre: Political hip-hop
- Length: 4:26
- Label: Ruthless; Priority
- Songwriter: O'Shea Jackson
- Producers: DJ Yella; Dr. Dre

N.W.A singles chronology
"Gangsta Gangsta" (1988)	"Express Yourself" (1989)	"100 Miles and Runnin'" (1990)

Audio sample
- file; help

Music video
- "Express Yourself" on YouTube

"Express Yourself" is a song recorded by American hip-hop group N.W.A, performed solo by Dr. Dre. The song, off their debut studio album Straight Outta Compton (1989), samples Charles Wright & the Watts 103rd Street Rhythm Band's 1970 song of the same name. Unlike most songs on the album and by N.W.A, the song is devoid of profanity and violence. "Express Yourself" was released as the album's second and final single, the album version of the track features rap vocals from Dr. Dre only, whereas the extended single version features small verses from MC Ren and Ice Cube, the writer of the song. The song reached number 50 on the UK singles chart in September 1989, before reaching number 26 on reissue in June 1990.

== History ==
The song's vocals are primarily handled by Dr. Dre though an extended version features interludes from Ice Cube and MC Ren. The song samples Charles Wright & the Watts 103 Street Rhythm Band's 1970 hit, also titled "Express Yourself".

The song's lyrics focus on the concept of freedom of speech and the constraints placed on rappers by radio censorship, and disses other rappers for producing radio-friendly songs for mass appeal. The song, ironically, is based on a pop music sample with a clearly 'radio friendly' tone, and contains no profanity itself.

== Music video ==
The music video starts with a black and white video of slaves working on a plantation. As they escape, the video transitions to the ghetto, as the band members walk through it and dance with the local residents. A "No Rapping" sign is shown. A mounted officer (played by Skeeter Rader) enforces the law on the crowd. Occasionally band members are depicted rapping in a prison environment. Later on Dr. Dre plays the role of the U.S. president. At one point he is talking on the phone with Mikhail Gorbachev, and a photo of Martin Luther King Jr. can be seen in the background. One of King's quotes, the famous "I Have a Dream", also appears on a large sign that the band members walk through as the song properly begins. A parody of the assassination of John F. Kennedy follows. The video ends with Dr. Dre being executed in an electric chair. In the version appearing on the EMI YouTube channel and on N.W.A's official Vevo channel on YouTube, numerous parts are blurred out including logos and faces. Despite this, the complete uncensored video can still be found online. The music video features cameos by Sir Jinx, TK Kirkland, and a then-unknown Warren G.

== Cover versions and samples ==
Labrinth heavily interpolated the song for his song of the same name for his debut studio album Electronic Earth (2012): the song was released as a single and reached the UK top 20.

The underground Basque Country group Negu Gorriak featured a Basque language version, titled "Adieraz zaitez", on their covers album Salam, agur (1996).

In May 1990, the Australian Broadcasting Corporation's music radio station Triple J played the song on a loop while its employees went on strike over the suspension of its news director, Nick Franklin. He had played a portion of fellow N.W.A. song "Fuck tha Police" in a segment discussing the song's subject matter; the station had, notably, been playing the song without incident for several months, but ABC's radio head had requested that the song be given a "rest". "Express Yourself" was played 82 times in a row until the employee was reinstated. Triple J paid tribute to the event in April 2014, when the launch of its new digital radio station Double J was preceded by a stunt loop of "Express Yourself", including the original recording and covers performed by Australian musicians such as the Audreys and Darren Hanlon.

== Track listing ==
1. "Express Yourself" (Extended Mix) – 4:42
2. "Bonus Beats" – 3:03
3. "Straight Outta Compton" (Extended Mix) – 4:54
4. "A Bitch Iz a Bitch" – 3:10

== Charts ==
Chart (1989)	Peak position
Australia (ARIA)	96
UK Singles (Official Charts)	26
US Hot R&B/Hip-Hop Songs (Billboard)	45
US Hot Rap Songs (Billboard)	2

== Certifications ==
Region	Certification	Certified units/sales
New Zealand (RMNZ)	Platinum	30,000^{‡}
United Kingdom (BPI)	Gold	400,000^{‡}
^{‡} Sales+streaming figures based on certification alone.
