= Till You Get Enough =

Single by the Watts 103rd Street Rhythm Band

from the album In the Jungle, Babe
- B-side: "Light My Fire"
- Released: June 1969
- Genre: R&B, Funk
- Length: 3:45
- Label: Warner Bros.
- Songwriter(s): Al McKay, Charles Wright, James Gadson, John Rayford, Melvin Dunlap
- Producer(s): Charles Wright

The Watts 103rd Street Rhythm Band singles chronology
"Do Your Thing" (1968)	"Till You Get Enough" (1969)	"Must Be Your Thing" (1969)

"Till You Get Enough" is a song written by Al McKay, Charles Wright, James Gadson, John Rayford, and Melvin Dunlap and performed by the Watts 103rd Street Rhythm Band. The song was produced by Wright and arranged by Wright, Rayford, Gabe Flemings, and Ray Jackson, and was featured on their 1969 album, In the Jungle, Babe.

== Chart performance ==
"Till You Get Enough" reached #12 on the R&B chart and #67 on the Billboard Hot 100 in 1969.
