= Arthur Louis =

- Also known as: Black Cat
- Born: Louis Arthur Bulgin; 21 June 1945; Jamaica
- Died: 24 December 2014 (aged 69) Surbiton, England
- Genres: Rock, blues, reggae
- Occupations: Musician, songwriter, arranger
- Instruments: Vocals, guitar
- Years active: 1968–2014
- Labels: Island, Mango, Plum, Crown, Mainstreet, Philips, Wetbird, Fresh Air, Pandisc, Black Cat, Solid
- Formerly of: Terminal Stations, Eric Clapton, Gene Chandler

Arthur Louis (21 June 1945 – 24 December 2014) was a British rock, blues and reggae cross-over musician. His surname is pronounced as luːɪs (Lewis) and he held British nationality. He released three solo albums and was responsible for introducing the work of musician Mike Oldfield to Virgin Records.

== Early life ==
Born in Jamaica, Louis moved to Brooklyn with his family at a young age. In his late teens he attended Michigan State University where he joined and toured with the band Terminal Stations, in Brazil and Germany.

== Career ==
At the beginning of his career Louis toured with terminal stations. He recorded his debut album Knockin' on Heaven's Door in 1974, which featured Eric Clapton and Gene Chandler. The title song, a reggae blues version of Bob Dylan's "Knockin' on Heaven's Door" was released as a single in July 1975, a week before Eric Clapton released his own interpretation of Louis's arrangement, of the same song. Louis's release received attention but was overshadowed by Clapton's, which featured Louis's "Someone Like You" as the B-side. Louis's album Knocking on Heaven's Door, eventually climbed to #6 in International charts.

In 1991 the German record label Discovery Sounds licensed and re-mastered his debut album, Knockin' on heaven's door and the subsequent release revived interest in his music. Later renewed interest from Japan prompted the release of his second album Back From Palookaville (1998).

By 2006 Louis was making concert appearances in Europe once more, which re-established him in countries such as Italy and Spain. In December 2008, he appeared on BBC Radio 2's Paul Jones Show. In 2009 he released his third album Black Cat, a retrospective album which included new songs such as the title track "Black Cat". In the same year he played with his band at the London launch of 'Martin Scorsese Presents The Blues'. On 23 August the same year he appeared in London again with Bobby Tench, Jim Cregan and Roger Chapman.

== Musical style and influence ==
Louis's use of modern blues rock has been compared with Taj Mahal and Peter Brown's review of the album Black Cat (2009), stated that Louis was "the personification of easy electric blues" and that he brought "new energy and expression to the form".

He was an established reggae, blues and rock cross-over artist and his interpretation of Bob Dylan's song "Knockin' on Heaven's Door" brought him international attention. When writing about the re-release of Louis's "Knockin' on Heaven's door" in 1991, journalist Phil Parker mentioned Louis's influence on Clapton's reggae interpretations. Other songs which exemplify his work in this genre are, his version of Dylan's "I shall be released" and "If I ever needed you" co-written with Scott English, both from Back from Palookaville.

== Discography ==
=== Albums ===
- Knockin' on Heaven's Door, Arthur Louis featuring Eric Clapton and Gene Chandler. Plum 001 (1976)
- Back From Palookaville, Arthur Louis. Crown 4053 (1998)
- Knocking on Heaven's Door, Arthur Louis with Eric Clapton. Pandisc 8949 (1999)
- Knocking on Heaven's Door, Arthur Louis featuring Eric Clapton. Discovery Sounds 250043 (2006)
- Knocking on Heaven's Door/Back From Palookaville, Arthur Louis (double CD). Black Cat BLACKCAT001 (2008)
- Black Cat, Arthur Louis. Black Cat BLACKCATCD 002 (2009)
- Knocking on Heaven's Door Arthur Louis with Eric Clapton. Solid CDSOL 1399 Japan (2011)

=== Singles ===
- "I just called to say I love you" (as Arthur Louie). Fresh Air 515 80 (1974).
- "Knockin' on Heaven's Door"/"The Dealer" Arthur Louis. Island WIP 6448 UK (1975)
- "Knocking on Heaven's Door"/"Plum" Arthur Louis. Plum PR001 UK(1975)
- "Still, It Feels Good"/"Come on And Love Me. Arthur Louis. Mainstreet 12 SPMS 104 (1981) 12" EP
- "Knocking on Heaven's Door (Hot Perrers Return Mix)"/"Knocking on Heaven's Door (TNT Explosive Mix)" Arthur Louis. ARTHUR001 Promo (2000) EP

=== Knocking on Heaven's Door (Arthur Louis arrangement) ===
Arthur Louis's arrangement of the Bob Dylan song "Knockin' on Heaven's Door" first appeared on Louis's album "Knockin' on Heaven's Door" (1974)

also appears on

- "Knockin' on Heaven's Door" single, Arthur Louis. Island WIP 6448 UK (1975)
- "Knockin' On Heaven's Door" single, Eric Clapton version (arr A.Louis). RSO 2090 166 (1975)
- This Is Reggae Music Vol2 various Artists, Arthur Louis version. Mango 9327 (1975)
- This Is Reggae Music Vol2 various Artists, Arthur Louis version. Island ILPS 9327 US (1975)
- Spécial Club Eté 78 Vol1 various artists, Arthur Louis version. Philips 6830 773 France (1978)
- "Knockin' On Heaven's Door", Eric Clapton version (arr A.Louis). Track 15 CD No3 Crossroads, Eric Clapton (4-CD set). Polydor 835 261 (1988)
- This Is Reggae Music Vol5 various Artists, Arthur Louis version. Mango CCD9851 (1990)
- Knocking on Heaven's Door, Arthur Louis. Pandisc 8949 (1999)
- Knocking on Heaven's Door, Arthur Louis featuring Eric Clapton. Discovery Sounds 250043 (2006)
- "Knocking On Heaven's Door", Eric Clapton version (arr A.Louis). Track 15 CD No3 Crossroads, Eric Clapton (4-CD set). Polydor 530 2 809 (2007)
- Knocking on Heaven's Door, Arthur Louis and Eric Clapton. Solid CDSOL 1399 Japan (2011)

=== Someone like You (Arthur Louis song) ===
Louis's version of this song originally appeared on his album Knockin' on Heaven's Door (1974)

also appears on

- B-side of "Knockin' On Heaven's Door" single (Eric Clapton version/arr A.Louis) RSO 2090 166 (1975)
- Track 16 CD No3 Crossroads (Eric Clapton 4-CD set) Polydor 835 261 (1988)
- Knocking on Heaven's Door Arthur Louis featuring Eric Clapton. Discovery Sounds 250043 (2006)
- Track 16 CD No3 Crossroads (Eric Clapton 4-CD set). Polydor 530 2 809 (2007)
