= List of Best Selling Soul Singles number ones of 1970 =

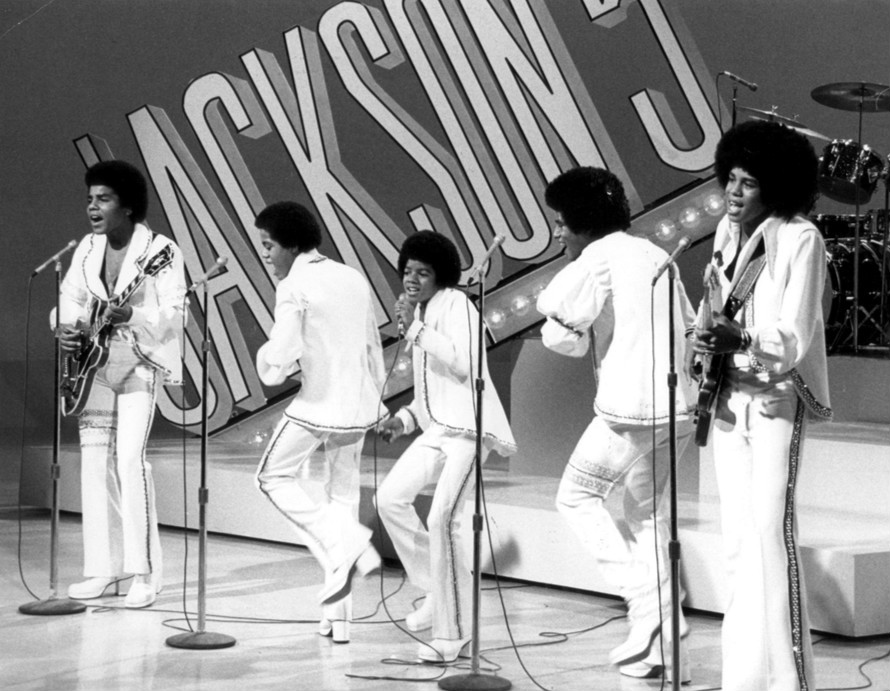
The Jackson 5 reached number one for the first time in January and by the end of the year had accumulated four chart-toppers.

Billboard published a weekly chart in 1970 ranking the top-performing singles in the United States in soul music and related African American-oriented music genres; the chart has undergone various name changes over the decades to reflect the evolution of such genres and since 2005 has been published as Hot R&B/Hip-Hop Songs. In 1970, it was published under the title Best Selling Soul Singles, and 17 different singles topped the chart.

In the issue of Billboard dated January 3, Diana Ross & the Supremes were at number one with "Someday We'll Be Together", the song's fourth and final week in the top spot. It was the final Supremes single to feature lead singer Diana Ross, who departed for a successful solo career; she would go on to achieve her first solo chart-topper later in the year with "Ain't No Mountain High Enough". The Supremes, with new lead singer Jean Terrell, topped the chart again in December with "Stoned Love", but it would prove to be the group's final soul number one.

The Jackson 5 displaced the Supremes from the top spot in the year's second issue of Billboard with "I Want You Back", giving the brothers their first number one with their debut single. The Jackson 5, all of whom were in their teens or younger, quickly experienced a run of continued success, achieving four number-one soul singles by the end of the year. All four also topped the all-genre Hot 100 chart, making them the first act ever to top that listing with their first four singles. "I'll Be There", the Jackson 5's fourth number one of 1970, became the highest-selling single released by the Motown label. The group spent a total of 20 weeks at number one in 1970; no other act spent more than six weeks in the top spot during the year. In addition to the Jackson 5, the Moments gained their first career number one when "Love on a Two-Way Street" spent five weeks in the top spot in May and June. In March, Brook Benton achieved his first chart-topper for nearly ten years when he reached number one with "Rainy Night in Georgia"; his last appearance in the top spot had been with "Kiddio" in 1960.

== Chart history ==
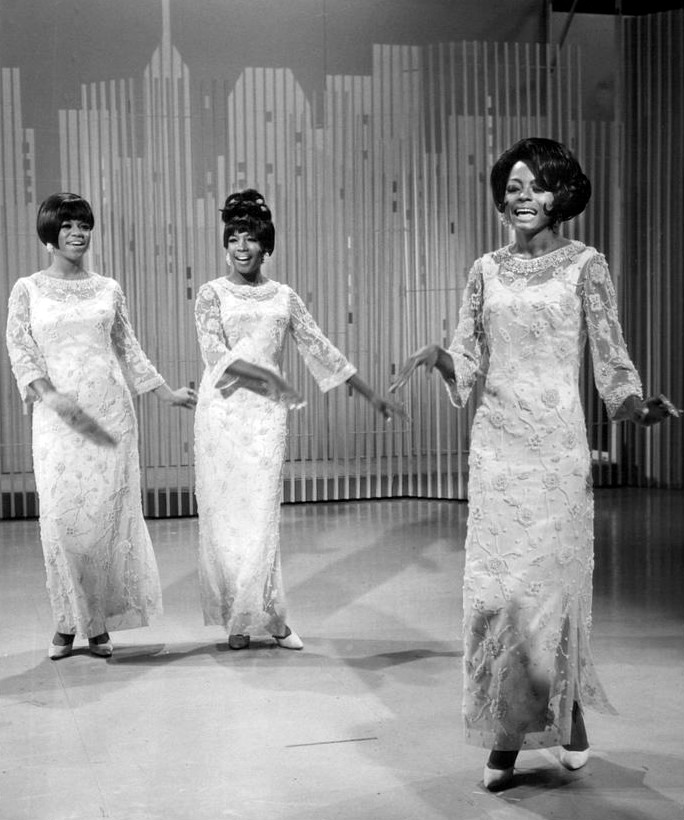
The Supremes had the first number one of 1970 with Diana Ross (far right) as their lead singer, and also the last number one of the year without Ross, who had departed for a solo career.

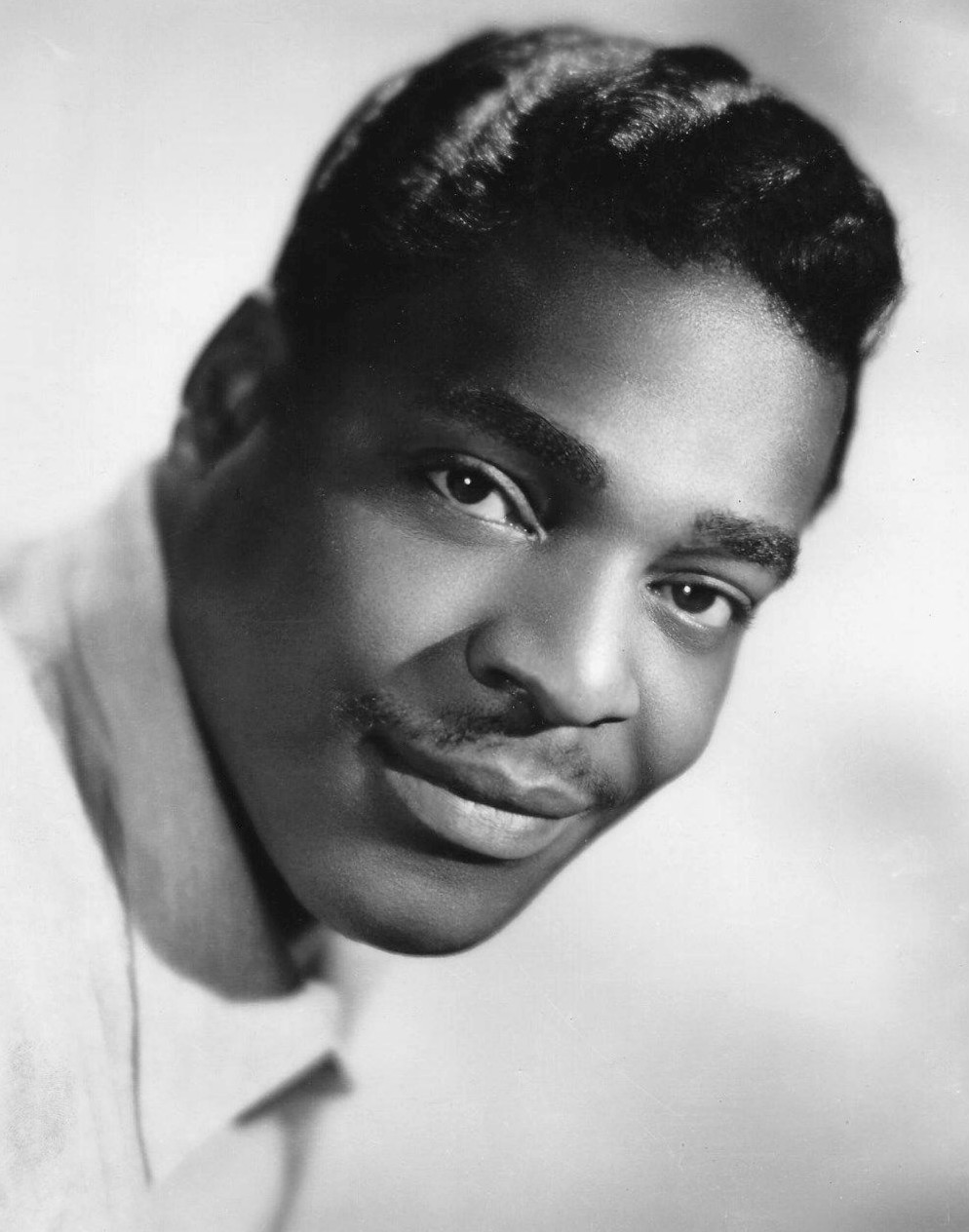
Brook Benton had his first number one in ten years with "Rainy Night in Georgia".

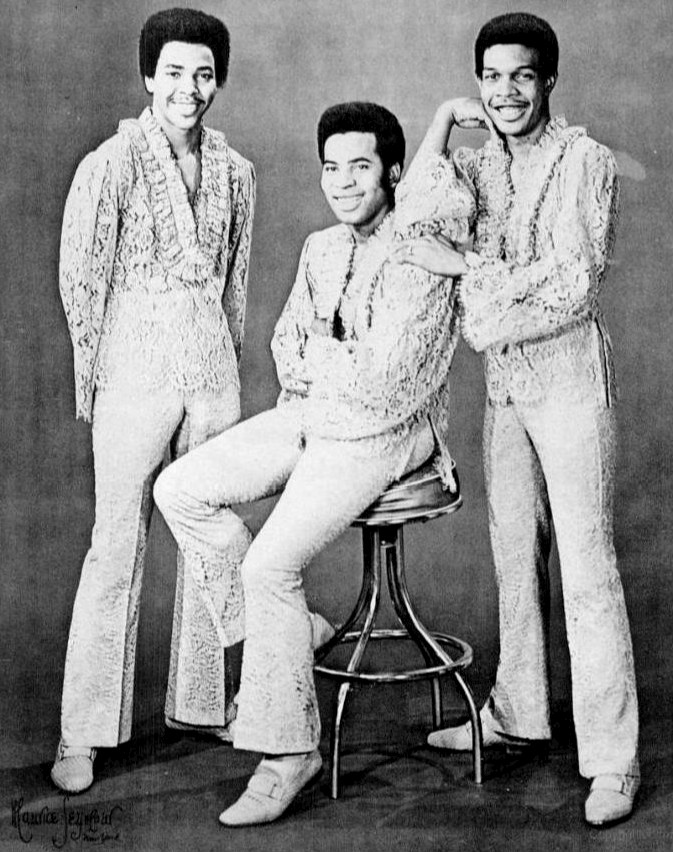
The Moments topped the chart for the first time with "Love on a Two-Way Street".

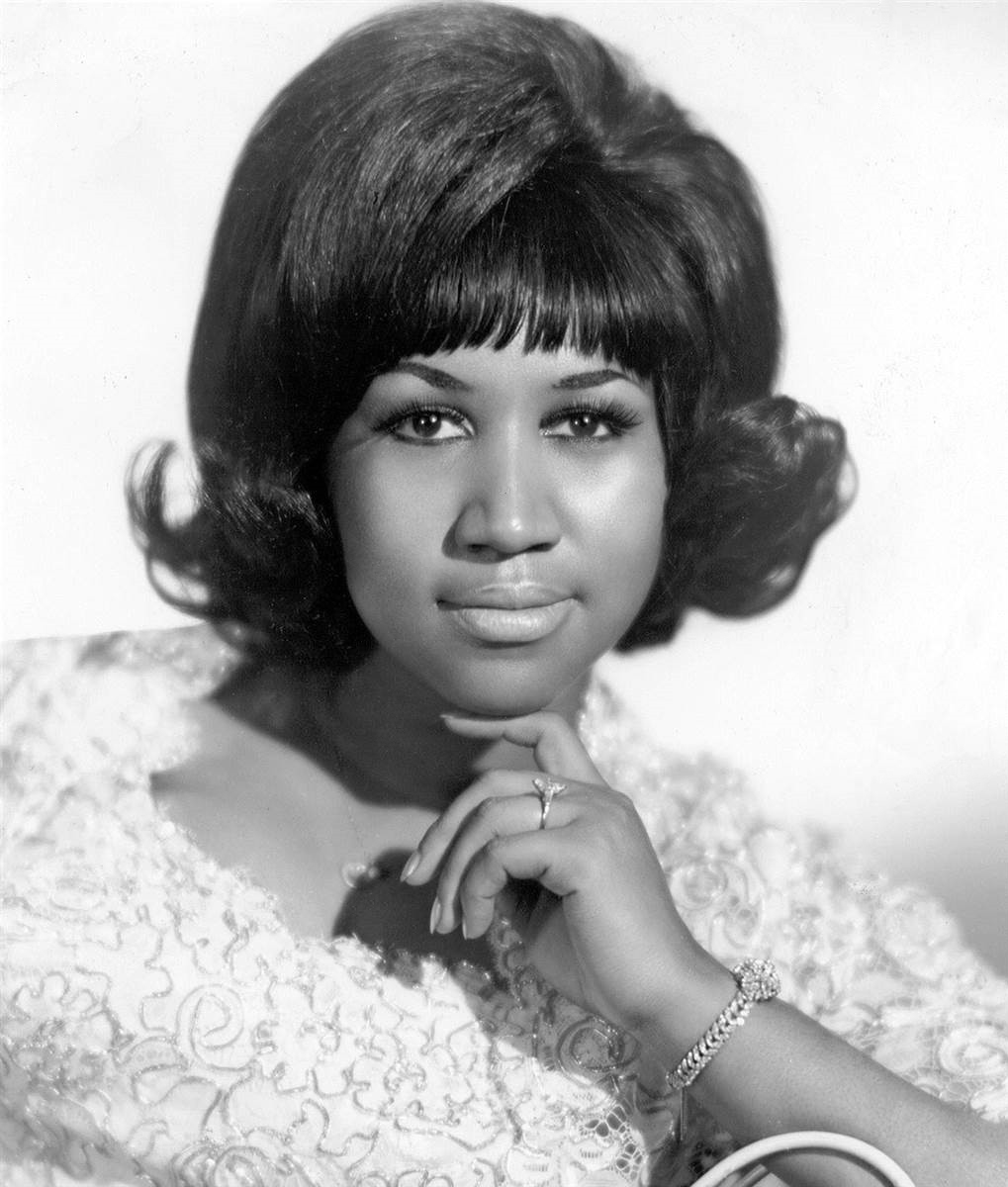
Aretha Franklin had two number ones in 1970.

Key
†	Indicates number 1 on Billboard's year-end soul chart of 1970

Chart history
Issue date	Title	Artist(s)	Ref.
January 3	"Someday We'll Be Together"	Diana Ross & the Supremes	
January 10	"I Want You Back"	The Jackson 5	
January 17	"I Want You Back"	The Jackson 5	
January 24	"I Want You Back"	The Jackson 5	
January 31	"I Want You Back"	The Jackson 5	
February 7	"Thank You (Falettinme Be Mice Elf Agin)"	Sly & the Family Stone	
February 14	"Thank You (Falettinme Be Mice Elf Agin)"	Sly & the Family Stone	
February 21	"Thank You (Falettinme Be Mice Elf Agin)"	Sly & the Family Stone	
February 28	"Thank You (Falettinme Be Mice Elf Agin)"	Sly & the Family Stone	
March 7	"Thank You (Falettinme Be Mice Elf Agin)"	Sly & the Family Stone	
March 14	"Rainy Night in Georgia"	Brook Benton	
March 21	"Call Me"	Aretha Franklin	
March 28	"Call Me"	Aretha Franklin	
April 4	"ABC"	The Jackson 5	
April 11	"ABC"	The Jackson 5	
April 18	"ABC"	The Jackson 5	
April 25	"ABC"	The Jackson 5	
May 2	"Turn Back the Hands of Time"	Tyrone Davis	
May 9	"Turn Back the Hands of Time"	Tyrone Davis	
May 16	"Love on a Two-Way Street"	The Moments	
May 23	"Love on a Two-Way Street"	The Moments	
May 30	"Love on a Two-Way Street"	The Moments	
June 6	"Love on a Two-Way Street"	The Moments	
June 13	"Love on a Two-Way Street"	The Moments	
June 20	"The Love You Save"	The Jackson 5	
June 27	"The Love You Save"	The Jackson 5	
July 4	"The Love You Save"	The Jackson 5	
July 11	"The Love You Save"	The Jackson 5	
July 18	"The Love You Save"	The Jackson 5	
July 25	"The Love You Save"	The Jackson 5	
August 1	"Signed, Sealed, Delivered (I'm Yours)"	Stevie Wonder	
August 8	"Signed, Sealed, Delivered (I'm Yours)"	Stevie Wonder	
August 15	"Signed, Sealed, Delivered (I'm Yours)"	Stevie Wonder	
August 22	"Signed, Sealed, Delivered (I'm Yours)"	Stevie Wonder	
August 29	"Signed, Sealed, Delivered (I'm Yours)"	Stevie Wonder	
September 5	"Signed, Sealed, Delivered (I'm Yours)"	Stevie Wonder	
September 12	"Don't Play That Song (You Lied)"	Aretha Franklin	
September 19	"Don't Play That Song (You Lied)"	Aretha Franklin	
September 26	"Don't Play That Song (You Lied)"	Aretha Franklin	
October 3	"Ain't No Mountain High Enough"	Diana Ross	
October 10	"I'll Be There" †	The Jackson 5	
October 17	"I'll Be There" †	The Jackson 5	
October 24	"I'll Be There" †	The Jackson 5	
October 31	"I'll Be There" †	The Jackson 5	
November 7	"I'll Be There" †	The Jackson 5	
November 14	"I'll Be There" †	The Jackson 5	
November 21	"Super Bad (Part 1 & Part 2)"	James Brown	
November 28	"Super Bad (Part 1 & Part 2)"	James Brown	
December 5	"The Tears of a Clown"	Smokey Robinson & the Miracles	
December 12	"The Tears of a Clown"	Smokey Robinson & the Miracles	
December 19	"The Tears of a Clown"	Smokey Robinson & the Miracles	
December 26	"Stoned Love"	The Supremes	

== See also ==
- Billboard Year-End Best Selling Soul Singles of 1970
- List of Billboard Hot 100 number-one singles of 1970
