= Love Land (song) =

Single by Charles Wright & the Watts 103rd Street Rhythm Band

from the album In the Jungle, Babe
- B-side: "Sorry Charlie"
- Released: January 1970
- Recorded: 1969
- Genre: R&B
- Length: 3:05
- Label: Warner Bros.
- Songwriters: Charles Wright; Don Trotter
- Producer: Charles Wright

Charles Wright & the Watts 103rd Street Rhythm Band singles chronology
"Must Be Your Thing" (1969)	"Love Land" (1970)	"Express Yourself" (1970)

"Love Land" is a song written by Charles Wright and Don Trotter and recorded by Charles Wright & the Watts 103rd Street Rhythm Band, released as a single in 1970.

== Charles Wright recording ==
"Love Land" was released as a single in 1970 on the Warner Bros label. It reached #16 on the Billboard Hot 100 and #23 on the U.S. R&B chart. The song was featured on their 1969 album, In the Jungle, Babe.

The song was produced by Wright. Lead vocals on the cut were performed by the band's drummer James Gadson (who would later become an in-demand session drummer).

The single ranked number 50 on Billboard's Year-End Hot 100 singles of 1970.

== Chart positions ==
Chart (1970)
Billboard Hot 100	16
U.S. R&B	23

== Other covers ==
- It was later covered by Tower of Power on their, "Great American Soulbook" Lp, released in 2009.
