= Anchorman: Music from the Motion Picture =

Soundtrack album by Various artists
- Released: 2004
- Genre: Rock
- Length: 55:06 (Note: The track lengths used here are from the album packaging, but some sources, such as, list various tracks as being one second longer or shorter.)
- Labels: Universal, Republic
- Producers: Adam McKay, Will Ferrell, Shauna Robertson, Judd Apatow, Avery Lipman, Monte Lipman

Anchorman: Music from the Motion Picture is the soundtrack album to the 2004 film Anchorman: The Legend of Ron Burgundy. The album is a compilation of the songs used in the film. Will Ferrell, in character as Ron Burgundy, gives a brief introduction to each song, and can be heard crying throughout "Shannon".

== Track listing ==
No.	Title	Writer(s)	Artist	Length
1.	"Legendary Anchor Ron Burgundy Welcomes You to His Album: A Life, A Song"	Ferrell	Will Ferrell (in character as Ron Burgundy)	1:21
2.	"Ride Captain Ride"	Mike Pinera, Frank Konte	Blues Image	4:08
3.	"Sunshine (Go Away Today)"	Edwards	Jonathan Edwards	2:41
4.	"Treat Her Like a Lady"	Eddie Cornelius	Cornelius Brothers & Sister Rose	3:21
5.	"Groovy Situation"	Russell Lewis, Herman Davis	Gene Chandler	3:43
6.	"Carry On Wayward Son"	Kerry Livgren	Kansas	5:46
7.	"Grazing in the Grass"	Harry Elston, Philemon Hou	The Friends of Distinction	3:22
8.	"Cherry, Cherry"	Diamond	Neil Diamond	3:10
9.	"That Lady"	Rudolph Isley, Ronald Isley, O'Kelly Isley Jr.	The Isley Brothers	6:03
10.	"Shannon"	Gross	Henry Gross	4:13
11.	"Use Me"	Withers	Bill Withers	4:00
12.	"Help Yourself"	Carlo Donida, Jack Fishman	Tom Jones	3:06
13.	"She's Gone"	Daryl Hall, John Oates	Hall & Oates	5:16
14.	"Afternoon Delight"	Bill Danoff	The Channel 4 News Team (Will Ferrell, Paul Rudd, Steve Carell, and David Koechner, in character as Ron Burgundy, Brian Fantana, Brick Tamland, and Champ Kind, respectively)	3:09
15.	"Ron Burgundy's Sign Off"	Ferrell	Will Ferrell (in character as Ron Burgundy)	1:47
Total length:				55:06

== Other songs in the film ==
Songs in the film but not in this soundtrack include:

- "Deep Burgundy" - Marc Ellis
- "El Paso" - Marty Robbins
- "If" - Bread
- "Baby Making Flute Solo" - Marc Ellis and Katisse Buckingham; includes a portion of the melody of "Aqualung" by Jethro Tull
- "Bread and Butter" - The Newbeats
- Mexican hat dance
