= Still Bill =

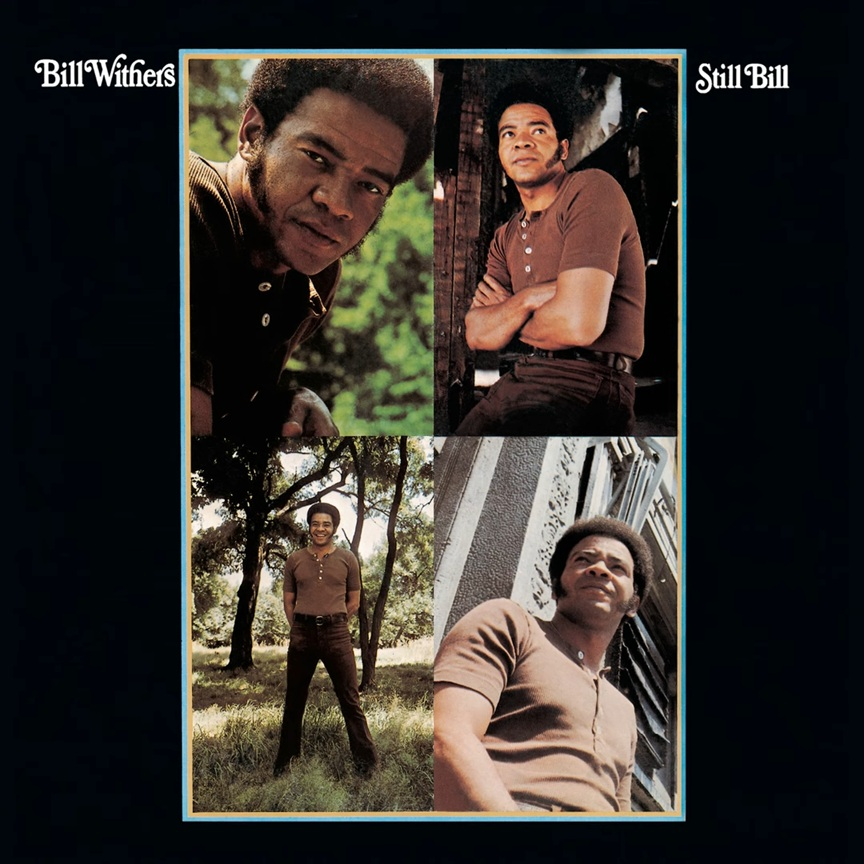

Studio album by Bill Withers
- Released: May 1, 1972
- Studio: Record Plant (Los Angeles)
- Genres: Soul; R&B; funk; blues
- Length: 36:14
- Label: Sussex
- Producers: Benorce Blackmon; Withers; James Gadson; Melvin Dunlap; Ray Jackson

Bill Withers chronology
Just as I Am (1971)	Still Bill (1972)	Live at Carnegie Hall (1973)

Singles from Still Bill
- 1. "Lean on Me" Released: April 21, 1972; 2. "Use Me" Released: 1972; 3. "Kissing My Love" Released: 1973

Still Bill is the second studio album by American soul singer-songwriter and producer Bill Withers. The album was released in May 1, 1972 through Sussex Records. The album was recorded and produced by Withers with musicians from the Watts 103rd Street Rhythm Band. The rhythmic music produced for the record features soul, funk, and blues sounds, backing lyrics that explore themes of human nature, emotion, and sex from a middle-class male perspective. It also features some of Withers' most popular songs, including the hit singles "Lean on Me" and "Use Me". A commercial and critical success at the time of its release, Still Bill has since been regarded by music journalists as a highlight of the singer's recording career and a classic of 1970s R&B.

== Reception ==
Still Bill was met with positive reviews. Writing for Rolling Stone in 1972, Vince Aletti regarded it as an improvement over Withers' debut album Just as I Am, particularly because of the singer's production, which sustains even the less exceptional songs here. "On the whole", Aletti claimed, "it's a tougher, more relaxed, more assured album ... Nothing is thrown away, everything works with an unexpected clarity and strength." Billboard hailed Still Bill as justification for the critical hype surrounding his debut and live performances, while observing "plenty of sunshine" in the music, highlighting "Lean on Me", "Who is He (And What Is He to You)", "Kissing My Love", and "Lonely Town, Lonely Street". Reviewing in Creem, Robert Christgau gave the record a B-plus and said, "Withers has created the most credible persona of any of the new middle-class male soul singers, avoiding Marvin Gaye's occasional vapidity, Donny Hathaway's overkill, and Curtis Mayfield's blackness-mongering. He sounds straight, strong, compassionate. This album moves out rhythmically, too". However, the critic concluded with reservations about its "missing some essential excitement".

Commercially, Still Bill produced two hit singles: "Lean on Me" (number one on both the Billboard pop and R&B charts in mid 1972) and "Use Me" (number two on the same charts later that year). On September 7, 1972, the album was certified gold by the Recording Industry Association of America (RIAA), having recorded at least 500,000 copies sold.

=== Reappraisal and legacy ===
Retrospective professional reviews
Review scores
Source	Rating
AllMusic	5/5 stars
Christgau's Record Guide	A
The Encyclopedia of Popular Music	4/5 stars
The Great Rock Discography	7/10
Mojo	5/5 stars
Music Story	5/5 stars
MusicHound R&B	2.5/5 stars
Rolling Stone	5/5 stars
The Rolling Stone Album Guide	4/5 stars
Uncut	4/5 stars

Retrospective appraisals have also been positive. Reviewing years later in Christgau's Record Guide: Rock Albums of the Seventies (1981), Christgau expressed more enthusiasm about Still Bill, saying that Withers is "also plenty raunchy and he can rock dead out". He went on to write that the "self-production here is adamantly spare, with Ray Jackson furnishing the hook of the year on 'Use Me,' one of the few knowledgeable songs about sex our supposedly sexy music has ever produced". PopMatters critic Andy Hermann wrote a review in anticipation of the album's CD reissue by Columbia Records in 2003, calling it "essential listening for any fan of early '70s funk and R&B". Hermann also highlighted the contributions of session musicians from the Watts 103rd Street Rhythm Band, crediting them for having helped Withers develop "a unique style of bluesy funk that was the perfect soundtrack to the emotional drama [that] leaked out from around the corners of Withers' laid-back West Virginia drawl". Writing in 2005, David Wild of Rolling Stone found the album "finer and funkier" than Just as I Am and "still a stone-soul masterpiece", while Stylus Magazine's Derek Miller called it "a stone-cold, gold-plated soul classic ... far and away Withers' best", and more than comparable to enduring LPs from the same period, such as Isaac Hayes' Hot Buttered Soul (1969), Mayfield's Roots (1971), Stevie Wonder's Talking Book (1972), and Al Green's Call Me (1973). Miller added that Still Bill exemplified Withers' musical daring, having fused soul, blues, and "muscular funk" into a sound that finds "form between the lines … bound by the heated muscle of its rhythms and the satin berth of its softer moments".

In 2007, Still Bill was included in The Guardian's list of "1,000 albums to hear before you die", with an accompanying essay that said the album "contains two of [Withers'] most epochal and best-loved compositions 'Lean on Me' and 'Who Is He (And What Is He to You)?' but [that] the blend of patient, understated, insistently funky acoustic playing is just as vital". Tom Moon included it in a similar publication, 1,000 Recordings to Hear Before You Die (2008), citing the album as "one of the most eloquent records" in rhythm and blues. "These are shades-of-gray stories, full of a mature understanding of human nature", Moon observed, before concluding that, "even when reflecting on weighty matters, Withers cultivates a mood of unflappable calm, making everything sound like a lazy summer evening on the front porch." In 2020, Still Bill ranked number 333 on Rolling Stone's revised edition of the "500 Greatest Albums of All Time" list.

== Track listing ==
All tracks are written by Bill Withers, except where noted.

Side one
No.	Title	Writer(s)	Length
1.	"Lonely Town, Lonely Street"		3:42
2.	"Let Me in Your Life"		2:41
3.	"Who Is He (And What Is He to You)?"	Withers, Stanley McKenny	3:13
4.	"Use Me"		3:45
5.	"Lean on Me"		4:17

Side two
No.	Title	Writer(s)	Length
1.	"Kissing My Love"		3:49
2.	"I Don't Know"		3:04
3.	"Another Day to Run"	Withers, Benorce Blackmon	4:38
4.	"I Don't Want You on My Mind"		4:34
5.	"Take It All In and Check It All Out"		2:42

- Sides one and two were combined as tracks 1–10 on CD reissues.

2003 CD bonus tracks
No.	Title	Length
11.	"Lonely Town, Lonely Street" (Recorded live at Carnegie Hall, 1973)	4:06
12.	"Let Me in Your Life" (Recorded live at Carnegie Hall, 1973)	4:16

== Personnel ==
- Bill Withers – vocals, guitar, acoustic piano (5), acoustic guitar (11, 12)
- Ray Jackson – acoustic piano, clavinet, Wurlitzer electric piano, horn and string arrangements
- Benorce Blackmon – guitar
- Melvin Dunlap – bass guitar
- James Gadson – drums, percussion
- Bobbye Hall – percussion (11, 12)

=== Production ===
- Bill Withers – producer (1–12)
- Ray Jackson – producer (1–12)
- Benorce Blackmon – producer (1–10)
- Melvin Dunlap – producer (1–10)
- James Gadson – producer (1–10)
- Bob Hughes – engineer
- Phil Schier – engineer, remixing
- Michael Mendel – art direction
- Maurer Productions – art direction
- Milton Sincoff – package design
- Hal Wilson – photography

2003 Reissue Credits

- Leo Sacks – producer
- Steve Berkowitz – A&R
- Darren Salmieri – A&R coordinator
- Joseph M. Palmaccio – mastering
- Lisa Buckler – product manager
- Maurice Joshua – product manager
- Triana D'Orazio – packaging manager
- Howard Fritzon – art direction
- Tim Morse – design
- Harry Goodwin – photography
- Bob Gruen – photography
- Michael Ochs Archive – photography
- SMP/Globe Photos – photography
- Bill Withers – liner notes

Studios

- Recorded at Record Plant (Los Angeles, California).
- Bonus Tracks recorded live at Carnegie Hall (New York City, New York).
- 2003 reissue mastered at Sony Music Studios (New York City, New York).

== Charts ==
Chart (1972)	Peak position
U.S. Billboard Soul Albums	1
U.S. Billboard Pop Albums	4
Canadian RPM 100 Albums	71

== See also ==
- List of number-one R&B albums of 1972 (U.S.)
