= Charles Wright (musician) =

American singer, instrumentalist and songwriter (born 1940)

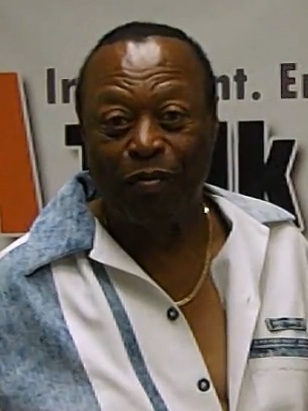
- Charles Wright in 2016

Background information
- Born: Charles Williams Wright; April 6, 1940 (age 86); Clarksdale, Mississippi, U.S.
- Genres: Doo wop, R&B, funk
- Occupation: Musician
- Instruments: Piano, guitar
- Years active: 1950s–present
- Labels: ABC, Capitol, Dunhill, Philips, Warner Bros.
- Formerly of: The Shields, Watts 103rd Street Rhythm Band

Charles Williams Wright (born April 6, 1940) is an American singer, instrumentalist and songwriter. He has been a member of various doo wop groups in the late 1950s and early 1960s as well as a solo artist in his own right. He is also the former leader and writer of hits for the group Watts 103rd Street Rhythm Band.

== Background ==
Wright was born on April 6, 1940, in Clarksdale, Mississippi, United States. The seventh of twelve children, he was raised on a cotton plantation. Years later, he would refer the sharecropping era as "The next shade after slavery". According to the book Up from Where We've Come, the sharecropper that owned that plantation was a cruel man by the name of Edward Miles. When Wright was 12, the family moved to Los Angeles. Contrary to his father's rule of not allowing his children to listen to secular music, he began listening to popular music and became mesmerized by it. Jesse Belvin was a singer that he heard on the radio was to have a significant influence on the young Wright and who became his mentor. After hearing Belvin on the radio, he looked up his number in the phone book and contacted him. He was told by Belvin to stop copying his sound and find his own. Later, Belvin took Wright under his wing and helped him get started. This association lasted until 1960, when Belvin died in a car crash at the age of 27. The following year Wright had his first hit record.

Wright is best known for his role as band leader of the group Watts 103rd Street Rhythm Band, which had the 1971 hit, "Express Yourself". He has been associated with Johnny Guitar Watson, touring with him and playing on early recordings by him. He also added his vocals to an album by The Watsonian Institute. For a very brief period, Wright managed singer Bill Withers.

He is also the author of the book Up from Where We've Come.

== Career ==
=== 1950s to 1960s ===
Early in his career, he was a member of The Shields, an LA based doo wop group that recorded in the late 1950s and early 1960s. Johnny Guitar Watson and Jesse Belvin had also been members of the group. Wright took the lead when he replaced lead singer Frankie Erivin. According to Tony Hilder, Wright and Belvin sang on the recorded version of the Shield's release "You Cheated". The song b/w "That's the Way it's Gonna Be" was released on Tender 513 in 1958. Also that year, a record that Write helped compose with Fred Lowery and Fred Stryker, "No Other Love" was recorded by The Blossoms and released on Capitol F4072.

Wright and Belvin became involved with A&R man Hilder who had worked for the Kent/Modern organization. With the assistance of Hilder, Wright penned "You're Unforgettable". It was recorded by Billy Watkins. Released in 1959 on the Challenge label, it was backed with "Rendezvous", a Robert Hafner composition. It was given a B+ rating by The Cash Box in its October 17 issue. It was also a prediction to do well by Billboard that month, and it was already charting locally that year. In early 1960, Hilder had come to San Luis Obispo to find a backing band to back Wright and Watkins on a tour. Norman Knowles of The Revels offered up his band to back them but Hilder didn't take up his offer.

Around 1962, a single "Latinia" bw "Runky" was released on Titanic 5003. According to Robert Dalley's book, Surfin' Guitars: Instrumental Surf Bands of the Sixties, the backing band was Bob Vaught's band, The Renegaids. The A side was written by Thomas Nuñes and Mark Hilder while the B side was written by Wright along with B. Adkins and B. Morgan.

By early 1966, and now recording as Charlie Wright, he had a single out on the Capitol label. Along with singles by The Mar-Keys and Percy Mayfield, Wright's single, "Help Yourself" was predicted to reach the R&B Singles chart.

In 1969, Capitol released "I Don't Have To Dream" bw "She Taught Me What Love" by Bobby Sheen. Wright wrote the A side song Wright and the B side he co-wrote with Sheen. Wright also had played guitar in one of the bands Sheen was in.

=== 1970s to present ===
By late August 1970, Charles Wright & the Watts 103rd Street Rhythm Band had entered the Billboard Soul Chart with "Express Yourself". It would eventually peak at No. 3 on the rhythm and blues chart and No. 12 on pop chart. This was one of about eight charting hits that he wrote for the band.

== Discography ==
Singles
Act	Title	Release info	Year	Notes
Charlie Wright	"Help Yourself" / "Number One"	Capitol 5576	1966	
Charles Wright	"(I'm Living On) Borrowed Time" / "Keep Saying (You Don't Love Nobody)"	Philips 40411	1966	
Charles Wright	"Soul Train" / "Run Jody Run"	Warner Bros. WB 7600	1972	
Charles Wright	"You Gotta Know Whatcha Doin'" / "Here Comes the Sun"	Warner Bros. WB 7630	1972	
Charles Wright	"(Well I'm) Doin' What Cums Naturally" Part 1 / "(Well I'm) Doin' What Cums Naturally" Part 2	ABC/Dunhill D-4364	1973	
Charles Wright	"you Threw It All Away" / "The Weight Of Hate"	ABC/Dunhill D-4381	1973	
Charles Wright	"Is It Real?" / "Don't Rush Tomorrow"	ABC/Dunhill D-15027	1975	
Charles Wright	"You Gotta Know Whatcha Doin" / "Here Comes The Sun"	Rhino R7 74167T		

Albums
Act	Title	Release info	Year	Notes
Charles Wright	Rhythm And Poetry	Warner Bros. BS 2620	1972	LP
Charles Wright	Doing What Comes Naturally	ABC/Dunhill DSD-50162	1973	LP
Charles Wright	Ninety Day Cycle People	ABC/Dunhill DSD-50187	1974	LP
Charles Wright	A Lil' Encouragement	ABC 8022–867	1975	8-Track
Charles Wright of The Watts 103rd St. Rhythm Band	Going To The Party	Memories Records 2001-2LP	1997	CD
Charles Wright	Music For The Times We Live In	M$WM Records 2002-2LP	2002	CD
Charles Wright of The Watts 103rd St. Rhythm Band	High Maintenance Woman	A Million Dollars Worth of Memories Records 2003-LP	2004	CD
Charles Wright	Finally Got It...Wright	A Million Dollars Worth of Memories Records M$WM 2003-2-7-LP	2006	CD
Charles Wright of The Watts 103rd St. Rhythm Band with The Gallahads	My Love Affair With Doo-Wop	A Million Dollars Worth of Memories Records 758794–2004	2004	CD

== Other ==
Publications
Title	Credited author	Publisher	Year	ISBN	Notes
Up: From where We've Come	Charles Wright	Million $ Worth of Memories Records	2016	1521116849	
