= Melvin Dunlap =

American bass player (1945-2021)

Melvin Carl Dunlap
- Born: June 9, 1945; Cleveland, Ohio, U.S.
- Died: September 12, 2021 (aged 76) Los Angeles, California, U.S.
- Genres: Soul, funk, rhythm and blues
- Occupations: Musician, songwriter, producer
- Instrument: Bass guitar
- Years active: c.1960-2021
- Formerly of: Charles Wright & the Watts 103rd Street Rhythm Band

Melvin Carl Dunlap (June 9, 1945 - September 12, 2021) was an American bass guitarist most recognized for his work with Bill Withers and Charles Wright & The Watts 103rd Street Rhythm band. Additionally, Dunlap was an accomplished session musician, producer, and composer.

== Career ==
Dunlap began his bass playing career as a young child, seeking a way to overcome the boredom of being confined indoors due to multiple ailments, including myasthenia gravis. He then became a bass player for hire in his hometown of Cleveland, Ohio, where he played with various local groups. In the early days of his career Dunlap was asked by fellow Ohio natives The O'Jays to become their touring bass player. He agreed and eventually settled in California, where he worked various odd jobs while pursuing a career as a musician. In Los Angeles, he met Charles Wright, a platinum-selling recording artist. Wright then hired Dunlap in the mid-1960s to be a part of his band Charles Wright and the Wright Sounds which would later go on to become Charles Wright & The Watts 103rd Street Rhythm Band.

Dunlap recorded bass on the band's signature 1970 hit record Express Yourself, and with the band toured alongside artists such as Nina Simone, The Temptations, Diana Ross, The Supremes, and Bill Cosby (who was a major advocate for the band and helped propel the group's popularity). During this period, Dunlap also briefly played bass for the funk band Dyke & The Blazers along with several other members of the Watts 103rd Street Rhythm Band.

The Watts 103rd Street Rhythm Band eventually disbanded as several members left to pursue outside music projects, including Dunlap (bass), James Gadson (drums), Ray Jackson (saxophone) and Benorce Blackmon (guitar) who all went on to join the Bill Withers's band. Together, they recorded the 1972 album Still Bill, which garnered massive success on both the pop and R&B charts thanks to the hit tracks "Lean on Me" and "Use Me." After that, Dunlap continued to play for Withers and went on to play on his next several albums, including +'Justments (1974). The same year, Dunlap also recorded bass on the Quincy Jones album Body Heat.

Over the next three decades Melvin Dunlap continued to record, produce, and compose for artists such as Quincy Jones, and Charles Wright. In 2006, he was featured on bass for Justin Timberlake's FutureSex/LoveSounds track "(Another Song) All Over Again," where he was joined by former band members Blackmon and Gadson. Dunlap also self-produced two records, one in 2009 entitled Holistic Funk Music for the Millenium Highway, and the other in 2012, entitled The World of Holistic Funk.

== Equipment ==
In the early portion of his career, Dunlap played an early model Fender bass, which he later traded for a newer model Fender Precision Bass that he would continue to use throughout much of his career, including his work with Bill Withers. Dunlap's signature electric bass tone is best exemplified on Bill Withers's tracks such as "Use Me" and "Kissing My Love." Additionally, Dunlap played a Gibson L9-S Ripper bass, a Fender Telecaster Bass, and a custom-built half-fretless bass, which he used on the Bill Withers tracks "Ruby Lee" and "Railroad Man." Throughout his career, he used a variety of amplifier and cabinet brands, including Ampeg, Acoustic, and Sunn.

On Bill Withers +'Justments (1974) album, Dunlap utilized a custom built half-fretless bass that he had designed himself.

== Personal life and death ==
Melvin Dunlap had seven children. He died in his sleep at his home in Los Angeles, California on September 12, 2021.

== Discography ==
With Bill Withers

- Still Bill (Sussex, 1972)
- +'Justments (Sussex, 1974)
- Making Music (Columbia, 1975)
- Naked & Warm (Columbia, 1976)

With Quincy Jones

- Body Heat (A&M, 1974)

With Justin Timberlake

- FutureSex/LoveSounds (Jive, 2006)

=== Self-Produced Works ===
- Holistic Funk Music for the Millenium Highway (2009)
- The World of Holistic Funk (2012)
