= Express Yourself (Charles Wright & the Watts 103rd Street Rhythm Band song) =

Single by Charles Wright & the Watts 103rd Street Rhythm Band

from the album Express Yourself
- B-side: "Living on Borrowed Time"
- Released: August 1970
- Recorded: 1970
- Genre: R&B, funk, soul
- Length: 3:51
- Label: Warner Bros.
- Songwriter: Charles Wright
- Producer: Charles Wright

Charles Wright & the Watts 103rd Street Rhythm Band singles chronology
"Love Land" (1970)	"Express Yourself" (1970)	"Solution for Pollution" (1970)

"Express Yourself" was written by Charles Wright and performed by Charles Wright & the Watts 103rd Street Rhythm Band. It became their signature song after its release in 1970 on their album, Express Yourself. The song was produced by Wright.

It reached #12 on the Billboard Hot 100 and was also their biggest hit on the U.S. R&B chart, reaching #3.

The single was nominated for the Grammy Award for Best R&B Performance by a Duo or Group with Vocals in 1971, losing to The Delfonics song "Didn't I (Blow Your Mind This Time)" and ranked #57 on Billboard's Year-End Hot 100 singles of 1970.

== Chart performance ==
Chart (1970)	Peak position
Canada RPM Top Singles	32
U.S. Billboard Hot 100	12
U.S. R&B	3
U.S. Cash Box Top 100	17

== Certifications ==
Region	Certification	Certified units/sales
United Kingdom (BPI)	Silver	200,000^{‡}
^{‡} Sales+streaming figures based on certification alone.

== Covers and samples ==
- Idris Muhammad on his 1971 album, Black Rhythm Revolution!
- N.W.A sampled it in their 1989 song also titled "Express Yourself". It reached #40 on the U.S. R&B chart and #50 on the UK Singles Chart, and was featured on their debut album, Straight Outta Compton, released the same year.
- Kurtis Blow on his 1988 album, Back by Popular Demand.
- Saccharine Trust on their 1989 album, Past Lives.
- Roger and Fu-Schnickens on the 1993 soundtrack album Addams Family Values: Music from the Motion Picture.
- The House Jacks, for Tommy Boy Records, on their 1997 album, Funkwich.
- Francis Rocco Prestia on his 1999 album, ...Everybody on the Bus with vocals by Tamara Champlin.
- Snooks Eaglin on his 2002 album The Way It Is with Jon Cleary.
- Jason Mraz in Cheaper by the Dozen 2.
- Tinchy Stryder sampled it on his 2009 album, Catch 22 on the song "Express Urself".
- Labrinth sampled it on the track "Express Yourself" from his 2012 album Electronic Earth. The song reached #12 on the UK Singles Chart.
