= Groovy Situation =

Single by Gene Chandler

from the album The Gene Chandler Situation
- B-side: "Not the Marrying Kind"
- Released: July 1970
- Genre: Rhythm and blues
- Length: 3:12
- Label: Mercury
- Songwriter(s): Russell Lewis; Herman Davis
- Producer(s): Gene Chandler

Gene Chandler singles chronology
| "From the Teacher to the Preacher" (1968) | "Groovy Situation" (1970) | "Simply Call It Love" (1970) |

"Groovy Situation" is a 1969 song written by Russell Lewis and Herman Davis and first recorded by Mel and Tim. The song was included on the duo's 1969 LP, Good Guys Only Win In The Movies, produced by Gene Chandler. Chandler then recorded the song himself and his single went to No. 12 on the Billboard pop chart and No. 8 on the R&B chart in 1970.

== Gene Chandler recording ==
"Groovy Situation" was a hit single when recorded by Gene Chandler on Mercury Records in 1970, in a version produced by Chandler and arranged by Tom Washington. It was Chandler's second-biggest chart hit single, his biggest being the million-selling #1, "Duke of Earl", in 1962. It was taken from his album, The Gene Chandler Situation. This version is noted for the instrumental quoting, by muted trumpets, of the first eight notes of the song "A-Tisket, A-Tasket" heard during the introduction as well as in the coda section, before the repeated chorus takes place before the song's fade. Chandler's version is also noted for the repeated phrase: "Can You Dig It", heard in the introductions of the two verses. The song also features a bass line played by jazz musician Richard Evans.

The success of this, and other records Chandler wrote, recorded and produced that year earned him The National Association of Television and Radio Announcers Producer of the Year Award in 1970, against other nominees that included Kenneth Gamble, Leon Huff and Norman Whitfield.

== Chart performance ==
Chandler's single reached No. 12 on the Billboard Hot 100, and was a top 10 hit, on the Billboard Best Selling Soul Singles chart, peaking at No. 8. It was also an RIAA-certified million-seller, the gold record being awarded in November 1970.

== In popular culture ==
- A portion of Chandler's version of the song was used in the 2004 film Anchorman: The Legend of Ron Burgundy, and appears on the film's soundtrack.
