= Gene Chandler =

American singer-songwriter (born 1940)

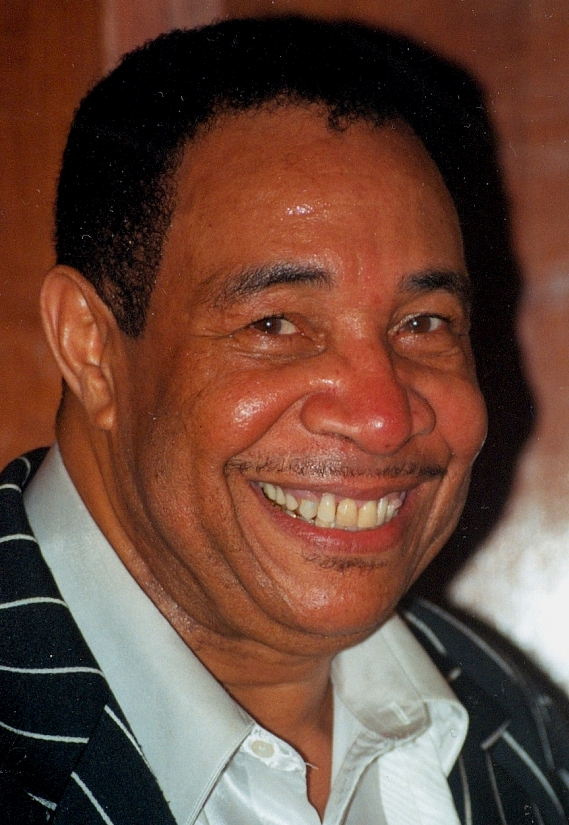

Background information
- Also known as: The Duke of Earl, the Duke
- Born: Eugene Drake Dixon; July 6, 1937 (age 89); Chicago, Illinois, U.S.
- Genres: R&B; soul; disco
- Occupations: Singer-songwriter; record producer; record company executive; music publisher
- Years active: 1951−present

Gene Chandler (born Eugene Drake Dixon; July 6, 1937) is an American singer, songwriter, music producer, and record-label executive. Chandler is nicknamed "the Duke of Earl" or, simply, "the Duke." He is best known for his most successful songs, "Duke of Earl" and "Groovy Situation", and his association with the Dukays, the Impressions, and Curtis Mayfield.

Chandler is a Grammy Hall of Fame inductee and a recipient of the Rhythm and Blues Foundation's Pioneer Award. He is one of the few singers to achieve chart success spanning the doo-wop, rhythm and blues, soul and disco musical eras, with some top-40 pop and R&B chart hits between 1961 and 1986. Chandler was inducted as a performer into the Rhythm and Blues Music Hall of Fame on August 24, 2014. In 2016, he became a double inductee in the R&B Music Hall of Fame with his induction as an R&B music pioneer.

== Early years ==
Chandler was born Eugene Drake Dixon in Chicago on July 6, 1937. He attended Englewood High School on the city's South Side. Chandler began performing during the early 1950s with the Gaytones. He joined the Dukays with James Lowe, Shirley Jones, Earl Edwards and Ben Broyles in 1957, soon becoming their lead singer. After being drafted into the U.S. Army, Chandler returned to Chicago in 1960 and rejoined the Dukays.

== Career ==
The Dukays were offered a recording contract by Nat Records and recorded a single, "The Girl Is a Devil" (1961), with producers Carl Davis and Bill "Bunky" Sheppard. This was followed by a session in August 1961 which resulted in four songs, including "Nite Owl" and "Duke of Earl". Nat Records released "Nite Owl", and it became an R&B success by the end of the year. Davis and Sheppard shopped "Duke of Earl" to Vee-Jay Records, which released it in 1962 by Dixon (known as Gene Chandler).

"Duke of Earl" sold one million copies in a little over a month, and was awarded a gold disc by the RIAA. After the song spent three weeks at number one on the Billboard charts, Chandler purchased a cape, monocle, cane and top hat and advertised himself as the Duke of Earl. He appeared in costume singing "Duke of Earl" in Don't Knock the Twist, a 1962 film featuring Chubby Checker. Chandler's concerts became popular, and he performed encores – usually "Rainbow", a Curtis Mayfield song.

Chandler left Vee-Jay in the autumn of 1963 and recorded for Constellation Records, another Chicago company. After Constellation went bankrupt in 1966, he was contracted to Chess and then to Brunswick Records; for a time, Chess and Brunswick alternated in releasing Chandler's recordings. He had Top-20 hits with Constellation with "Just Be True" (1964) and "Nothing Can Stop Me" (1965), both written by Curtis Mayfield and produced by Carl Davis.

Other successes included "What Now," "Rainbow," "I Fooled You This Time," "Think Nothing About It," "A Man's Temptation," "To Be a Lover," "Rainbow '65" (recorded live at Chicago's Regal Theater), "Bless Our Love" and "You Can't Hurt Me No More." Chandler was also successful with his cover version of James Brown's "There Was a Time" and "You Threw a Lucky Punch", released as an answer song to Mary Wells' Motown hit "You Beat Me to the Punch".

After several years performing concerts, Chandler decided to become more involved with music production. He formed a production company and two record labels: Bamboo and Mister Chand. Chandler produced a hit with "Groovy Situation", released on Mercury Records in 1970, which reached number 12 on the Billboard Hot 100 and number eight on the Billboard R&B charts: his second-greatest success, after "Duke of Earl". "Groovy Situation" sold more than a million copies and was certified gold by the RIAA in November of that year.

Chandler had produced "Backfield in Motion" in 1969 for Mel and Tim on Bamboo Records, which reached number three on the R&B chart and the top 10 of the Billboard Hot 100. He followed this in 1970 with "Good Guys Only Win in the Movies" for the duo; the song reached number 17 on the R&B chart and number 45 on the pop-music chart.

Later that year, Chandler recorded the album Gene and Jerry: One on One with fellow Chicago artist Jerry Butler. He also was featured along with the Impressions, LeRoy Hutson and Curtis Mayfield on the live album Curtis in Chicago (1973). Chandler sang on Arthur Louis's album Knocking on Heaven's Door (1974), with Eric Clapton. A period with Curtom Records, a label co-founded by Mayfield, resulted in four self-produced singles; none charted.

Chandler had some success with disco-style music during the late 1970s, making records with his former producer Carl Davis which included "Get Down", "When You're #1" and "Does She Have a Friend?" Appointed executive vice-president of Davis' Chi-Sound Records, he worked with reggae singer Johnny Nash. During the mid to late 1970s, a resurgence of interest in 1950s music and pop culture inspired disc jockey Wolfman Jack to organize a tour by vintage acts, including Chandler.

"Duke of Earl" was sampled by Cypress Hill on "Hand on the Pump" from their album Cypress Hill (1991), and Chandler's song "Hallelujah, I Love Her So" was sampled on their album Black Sunday (1993). In 1997, he received a Pioneer Award from the Rhythm and Blues Foundation.

In 1988, "Duke of Earl" was included on the soundtrack of Hairspray; "Groovy Situation" appeared on Anchorman: Music from the Motion Picture (2004). In 2002, "Duke of Earl" was inducted into the Grammy Hall of Fame. "Duke of Earl" was selected by the Rock and Roll Hall of Fame as one of its "500 Songs That Shaped Rock and Roll". In 2016, Chandler was honored in his hometown of Chicago by having a street named after him for his industry accomplishments, hit records, and his civic and philanthropic efforts for the city and its people.

His son, Defrantz Forrest, sings with the Motown group The Originals.

== Discography ==
=== Albums ===
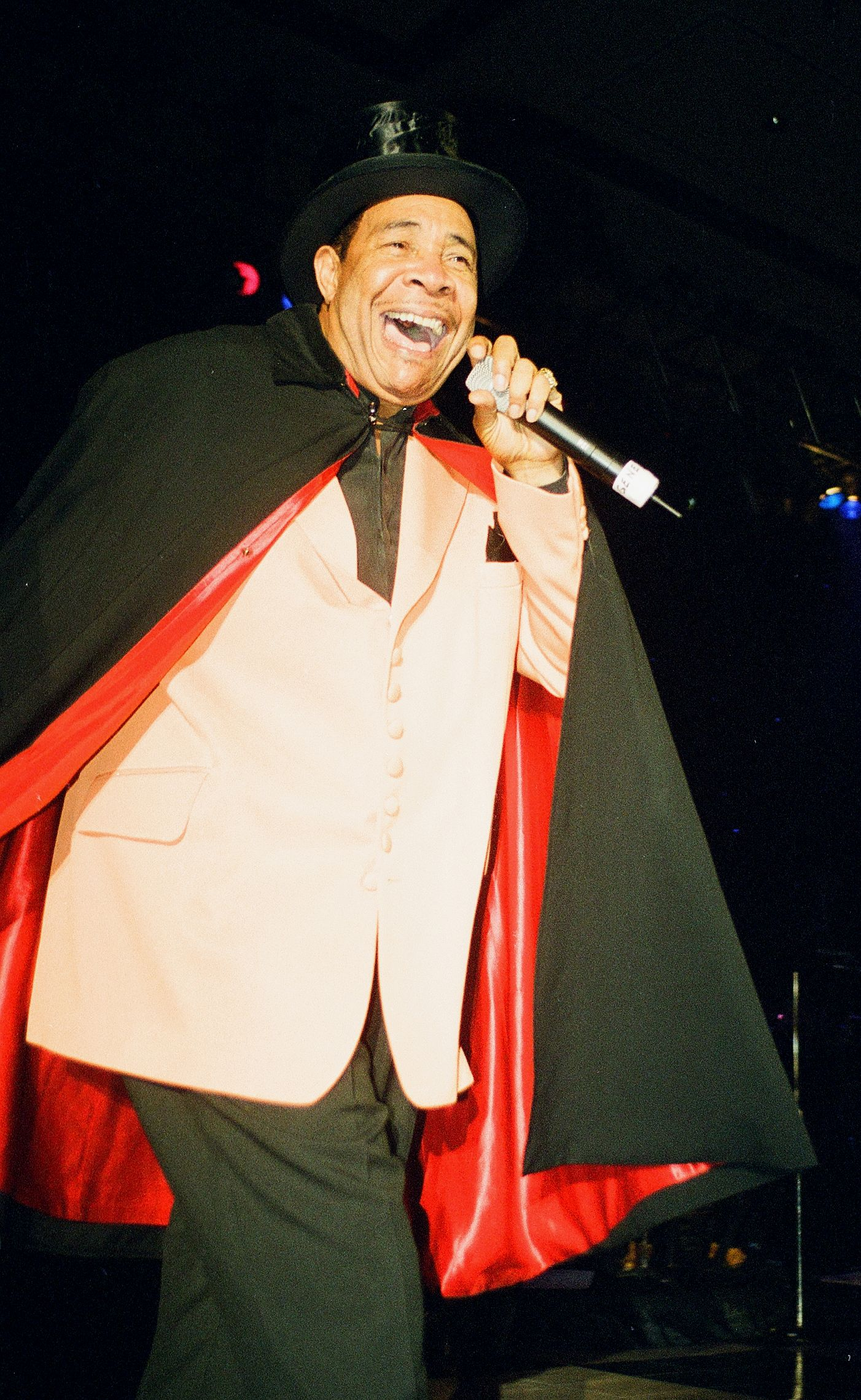
Chandler in his Duke of Earl costume (1997)

Solo releases and collaborations:

Year	Album	Peak chart positions		Label
Year	Album	US	US R&B	Label
1962	The Duke of Earl	69	—	Vee Jay
1965	Live on Stage in ‘65	124	5	Constellation
1967	The Girl Don't Care	—	—	Brunswick
1967	The Duke of Soul	—	—	Checker
1968	There Was a Time	—	—	Brunswick
1969	The Two Sides of Gene Chandler	—	—	Brunswick
1970	The Gene Chandler Situation	178	35	Mercury
1971	Gene and Jerry – One & One (with Jerry Butler)	143	—	Mercury
1978	Get Down	47	12	20th Century-Fox
1979	When You're Number One	153	50	20th Century-Fox
1980	'80	87	11	20th Century-Fox
1981	Here's to Love	—	—	20th Century-Fox
1985	Your Love Looks Good on Me	—	—	Fastfire
1995	Tell It Like It Is	—	—	Black Tiger Records
"—" denotes releases that did not chart.

=== Singles ===
Year	Single	Chart positions			Certifications
Year	Single	US Pop	US R&B	UK	Certifications
1961	"The Girl's a Devil"; The Dukays	64	—	—	
1962	"Duke of Earl"	1	1	—	RIAA: Gold
1962	"Nite Owl"; The Dukays	73	—	—	
1962	"Walk on with the Duke"; The Duke of Earl	91	—	—	
1962	"Rainbow" / "You Threw a Lucky Punch"	47; 49	11; 25	—	
1963	"Man's Temptation"	71	17	—	
1964	"Soul Hootenanny"	92	n/a	—	
1964	"Just Be True"	19	4 (cb)	—	
1964	"Bless Our Love"	39	n/a	—	
1964	"What Now"	40	18	—	
1965	"You Can't Hurt Me No More"	92	40	—	
1965	"Nothing Can Stop Me"	18	3	—	
1965	"(Gonna Be) Good Times"	92	40	—	
1965	"Here Comes the Tears"	102	—	—	
1965	"Rainbow '65"	69	2	—	
1966	"(I'm Just a) Fool for You"	88	—	—	
1966	"I Fooled You This Time"	45	3	—	
1967	"The Girl Don't Care"	66	16	—	
1967	"To Be a Lover"	94	9	—	
1967	"There Goes the Lover"	98	46	—	
1968	"Show Me the Way to Go"; Gene Chandler and Barbara Acklin	—	30	—	
1968	"Nothing Can Stop Me" (reissue)	—	—	41	
1968	"River of Tears"	—	19	—	
1968	"There Was a Time"	82	22	56 (Note: Chart position is from the official UK "Breakers List".)	
1968	"From the Teacher to the Preacher"; Gene Chandler and Barbara Acklin	57	16	—	
1970	"Groovy Situation"	12	8	—	RIAA: Gold
1970	"Simply Call It Love"	75	29	—	
1971	"You Just Can't Win (By Making the Same Mistake)"; Gene Chandler and Jerry Butler	94	32	—	
1971	"You're a Lady"	116	14	—	
1971	"Ten and Two (Take This Woman Off the Corner)"; Gene Chandler and Jerry Butler	126	44	—	
1972	"Yes I'm Ready (If I Don't Get to Go)"	—	47	—	
1978	"Tomorrow I May Not Feel the Same"	—	51	—	
1978	"Get Down"	53	3	11	BPI: Silver
1979	"When You're #1"	99	31	43	
1979	"Do What Comes So Natural"	—	73	—	
1980	"Does She Have a Friend?"	101	28	28	
1980	"Lay Me Gently"	—	73	—	
1982	"I'll Make the Living If You Make the Loving Worthwhile"	—	40	88	
1983	"You're the One"; Jaime Lynn and Gene Chandler	—	89	—	
1985	"Haven't I Heard That Line Before"	—	61	—	
1986	"Lucy"	—	43	—	
"–" denotes releases that did not chart or was not released.
