= ABC (The Jackson 5 song) =

1970 single by the Jackson 5

- Spanish 7" vinyl cover

Single by the Jackson 5

from the album ABC
- B-side: "The Young Folks"
- Released: February 24, 1970
- Recorded: December 1969
- Genre: Bubblegum-soul
- Length: 3:11 (single version); 2:54 (album version); 2:57 (radio edit)
- Label: Motown
- Songwriter: The Corporation
- Producer: The Corporation

The Jackson 5 singles chronology
"I Want You Back" (1969)	"ABC" (1970)	"The Love You Save" (1970)

Alternative release(s)
- Solid centre variant of the UK single

Audio
- "ABC" by the Jackson 5 on YouTube

"ABC" is a song by American pop band the Jackson 5. It was released as a single in 1970, peaking at number one on the Billboard Hot 100 singles chart for two weeks in April 1970, and was number one on the Best Selling Soul Singles chart for four weeks that same month. It is the title track to the group's second album and sold 2 million copies within the first week of its release in the US and more than 4 million copies worldwide.

Cash Box said: "Having whetted the world's appetite with 'I Want You Back' the Jackson 5 makes it back with another dynamite side cast in the image of its million seller. Searing vocals and the familiar drive of the Motown supporting cast assure another giant here." Billboard said: "This pulsating swinger has all the sales and chart potential of the initial entry ['I Want You Back']." Record World said the song proved that "the Jackson 5 are Motown's newest supergroup".

"ABC" was performed on television on American Bandstand (February 21, 1970), The Ed Sullivan Show (May 10, 1970), and The Flip Wilson Show (November 4, 1971), among many other broadcasts. The upbeat lyrics compare learning to love with learning the alphabet.

"ABC" was nominated for the Grammy Award for Best Pop Performance by a Duo or Group with Vocals at the 13th Annual Grammy Awards in 1971. 50 Cent told NME that the song was the first he remembered hearing: "I've always loved MJ, so I guess it was probably a good place to start music: right here, with the ABCs." On November 7, 2016, the Grammy Hall of Fame announced the song's induction, along with that of another 24 songs.

"ABC" is featured as an interpolation in Sigala's 2015 debut single "Easy Love" from his album Brighter Days.

== Personnel ==
Musicians on the song's session were uncredited, in line with Motown policy. Motown did not list session musician credits on their releases until 1971. The musicians who performed on "ABC" are believed to be as follows:

- David T. Walker – guitar
- Louis Shelton – guitar
- Don Peake – guitar
- Wilton Felder – bass guitar
- Gene Pello – drums
- Don Randi – piano
- Freddie Perren – keyboards
- Sandra Crouch – tambourine
- Joe Clayton – bongos

== Charts ==
=== Weekly charts ===
Weekly chart performance for "ABC"
Chart (1970)	Peak position
Belgian Singles Chart (Flanders)	24
Canada Top Singles (RPM)	3
UK Singles (OCC)	8
US Billboard Hot 100	1
US Billboard Best Selling Soul Singles	1
US Cash Box Top 100	1

Chart (2009)	Peak position
Australian ARIA Singles Chart	43
Irish Singles Chart	38
UK Singles (OCC)	50

=== Year-end charts ===
Year-end chart performance for "ABC"
Chart (1970)	Position
Canada (RPM)	50
US Billboard Hot 100	15

== Certifications and sales ==
Region	Certification	Certified units/sales
Denmark (IFPI Danmark)	Gold	45,000^{‡}
Japan (RIAJ)	Gold	100,000^{*}
United Kingdom (BPI)	Platinum	600,000^{‡}
United States	—	2,200,000
Summaries
Worldwide	—	4,100,000
^{‡} Sales+streaming figures based on certification alone.
