= List of Billboard Hot 100 number ones of 1970 =

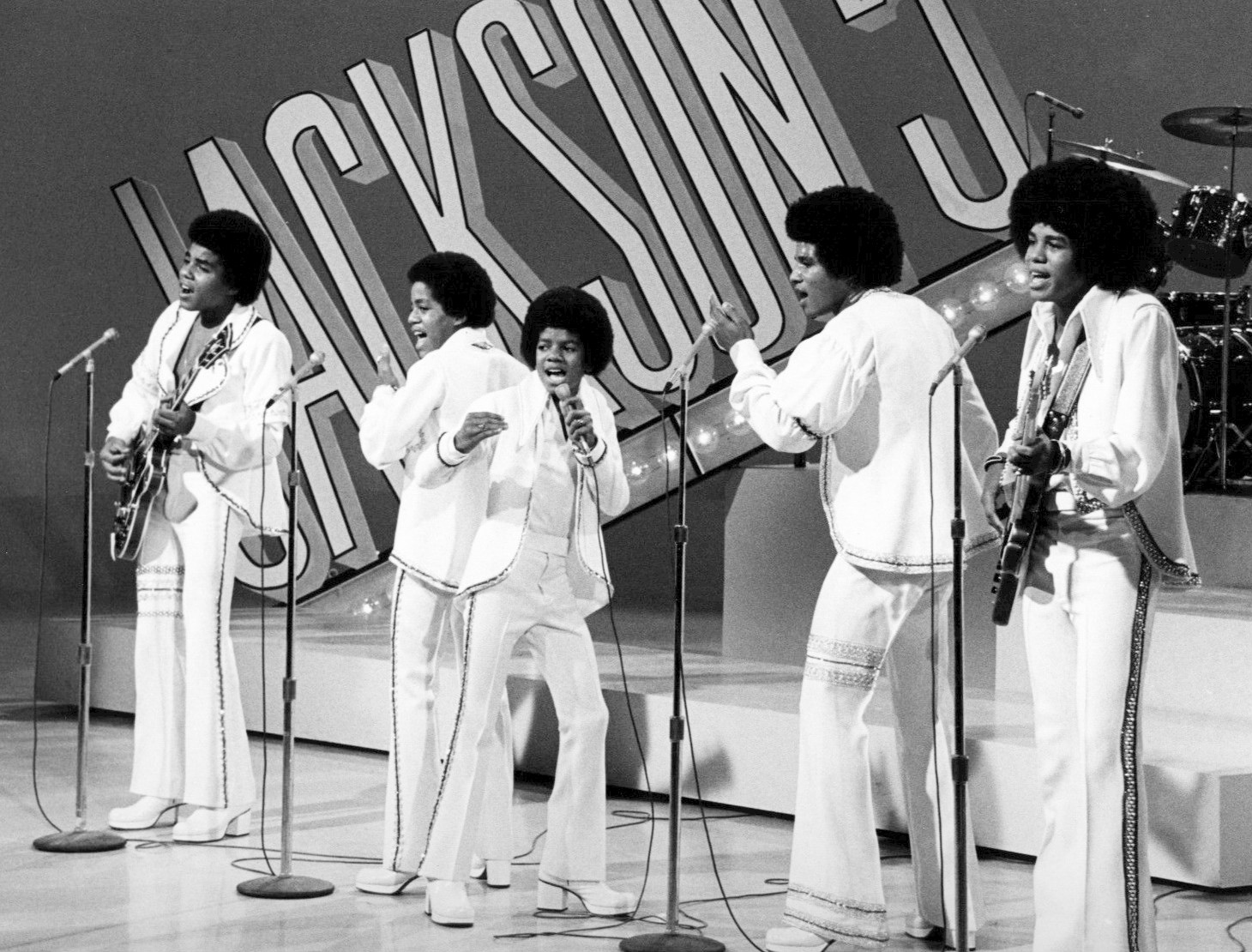
The Jackson 5 scored four number ones in 1970 with "I Want You Back", "ABC", "The Love You Save" and "I'll Be There".

The Billboard Hot 100 is a chart published since August 1958 by Billboard magazine which ranks the best-performing singles in the United States. In 1970, it was compiled based on a combination of sales and airplay data sourced from surveys of retail outlets and playlists submitted by radio stations respectively. During the year, 21 different singles spent time at number one.

In the issue of Billboard dated January 3, B. J. Thomas reached number one with "Raindrops Keep Fallin' on My Head", displacing the final chart-topper of 1969, "Someday We'll Be Together" by Diana Ross & the Supremes. The song, from the soundtrack of the film Butch Cassidy and the Sundance Kid, was the first number one for Thomas. After four weeks in the top spot, it was replaced by "I Want You Back" by the Jackson 5. It was the first Hot 100 entry for the brothers, who were aged between 11 and 18 when the song reached number one; lead singer Michael Jackson was the first performer born after the launch of the Hot 100 to reach number one. The group quickly exploded in popularity, and achieved three further number ones during 1970: "ABC" reached the top spot in April, "The Love You Save" in June, and "I'll Be There" in October. They were the first act to reach number one with their first four major-label singles. The Jacksons' total of ten weeks at number one was the most achieved by any act in 1970. The year's longest-running individual number one was "Bridge over Troubled Water" by Simon & Garfunkel, which spent six weeks atop the chart; it was the final number one for the influential folk-rock duo, which split up the following year.

The majority of the year's number ones were by acts that had not previously topped the Hot 100. In addition to the Jackson 5, Shocking Blue, the Guess Who, Ray Stevens, Three Dog Night, the Carpenters, Bread, Edwin Starr, Neil Diamond, the Partridge Family, and Smokey Robinson and the Miracles all achieved a number one for the first time in 1970. Shocking Blue, Bread, and the Partridge Family all reached number one with their first Hot 100 entries. In contrast, the Miracles had first charted on the Hot 100 over a decade earlier and achieved more than 30 entries, with lead singer Smokey Robinson receiving featured billing beginning in 1965, before finally reaching the top spot in December 1970 with "The Tears of a Clown". Similarly, Stevens had first charted in 1961, but took nine years to achieve a number one. Diana Ross and George Harrison, who had achieved multiple number ones during the 1960s with the Supremes and the Beatles, respectively, reached the peak position for the first time as solo acts in 1970. The Beatles were the only act other than the Jackson 5 to achieve more than one number one during the year, spending two weeks atop the chart in April with "Let It Be" and a further two in June with the double A-sided single "The Long and Winding Road" / "For You Blue". The latter single took the group's total to 20 number ones, all achieved since 1964, but it proved to be their final chart-topper; earlier in the year, Paul McCartney had publicly announced his departure from the band, leading to its complete break-up by the end of the year.

== Chart history ==
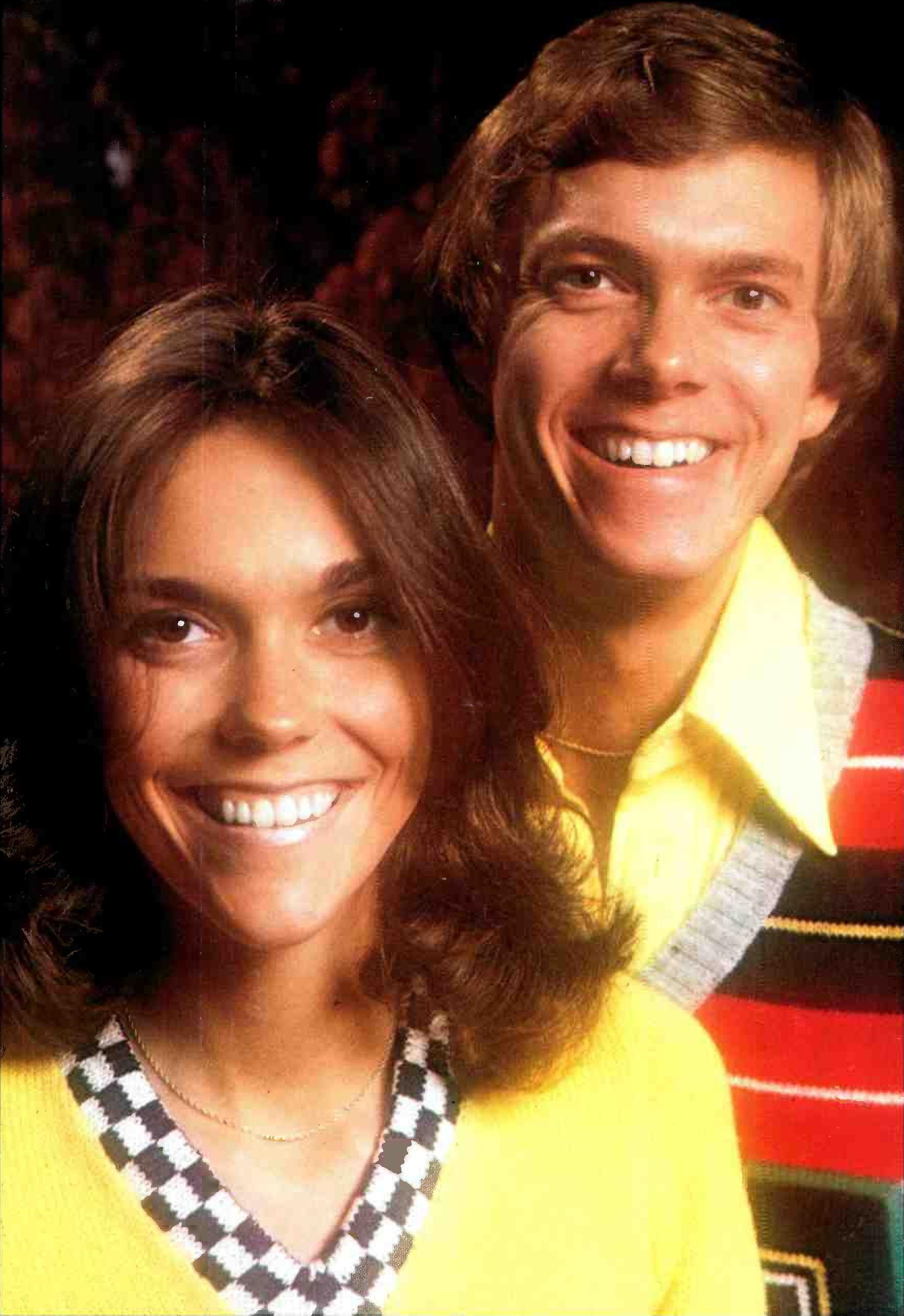
The Carpenters scored their first number one with "(They Long to Be) Close to You" reaching the top spot for four consecutive weeks in 1970.

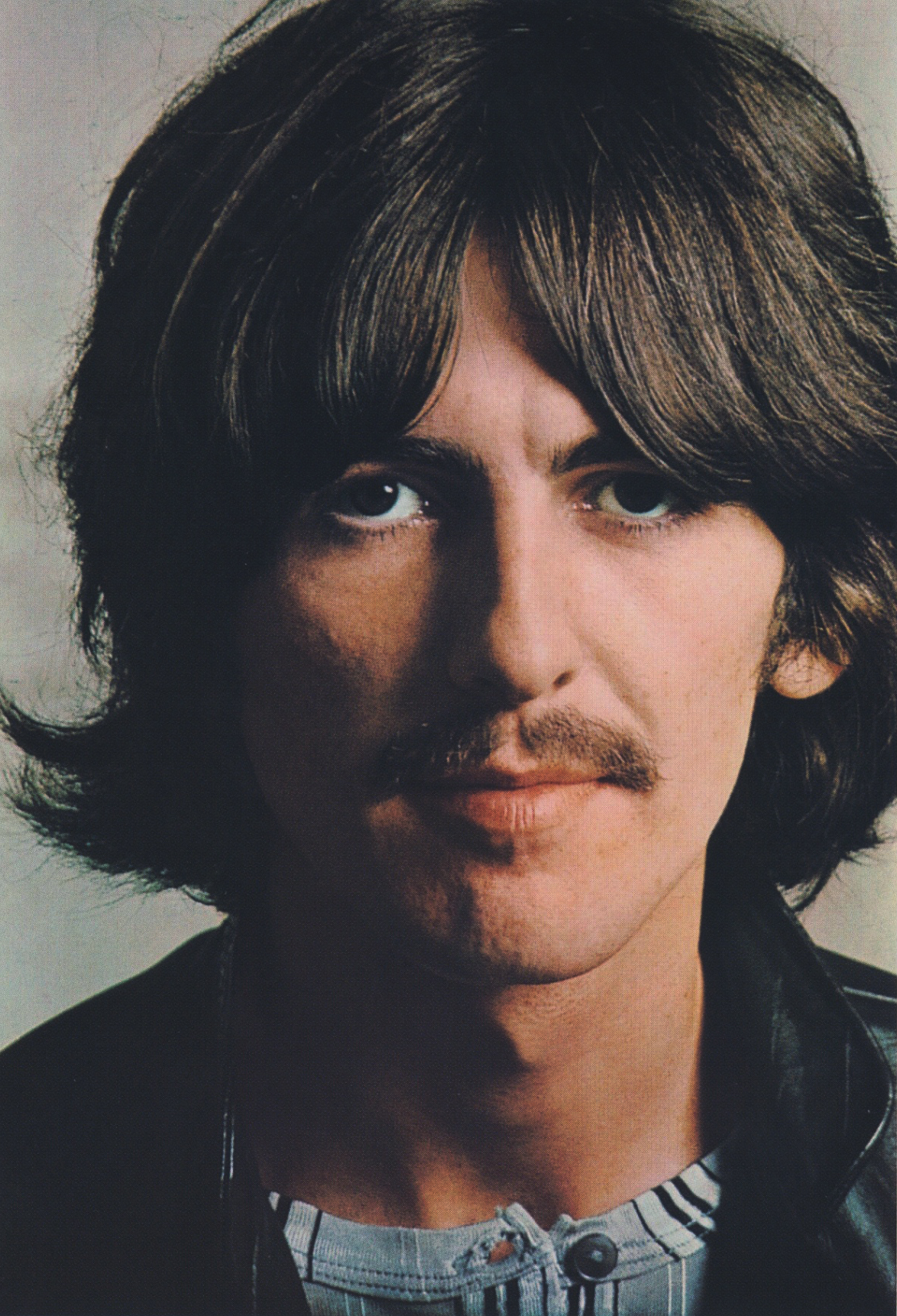
George Harrison was the first member of the Beatles to have a solo number one.

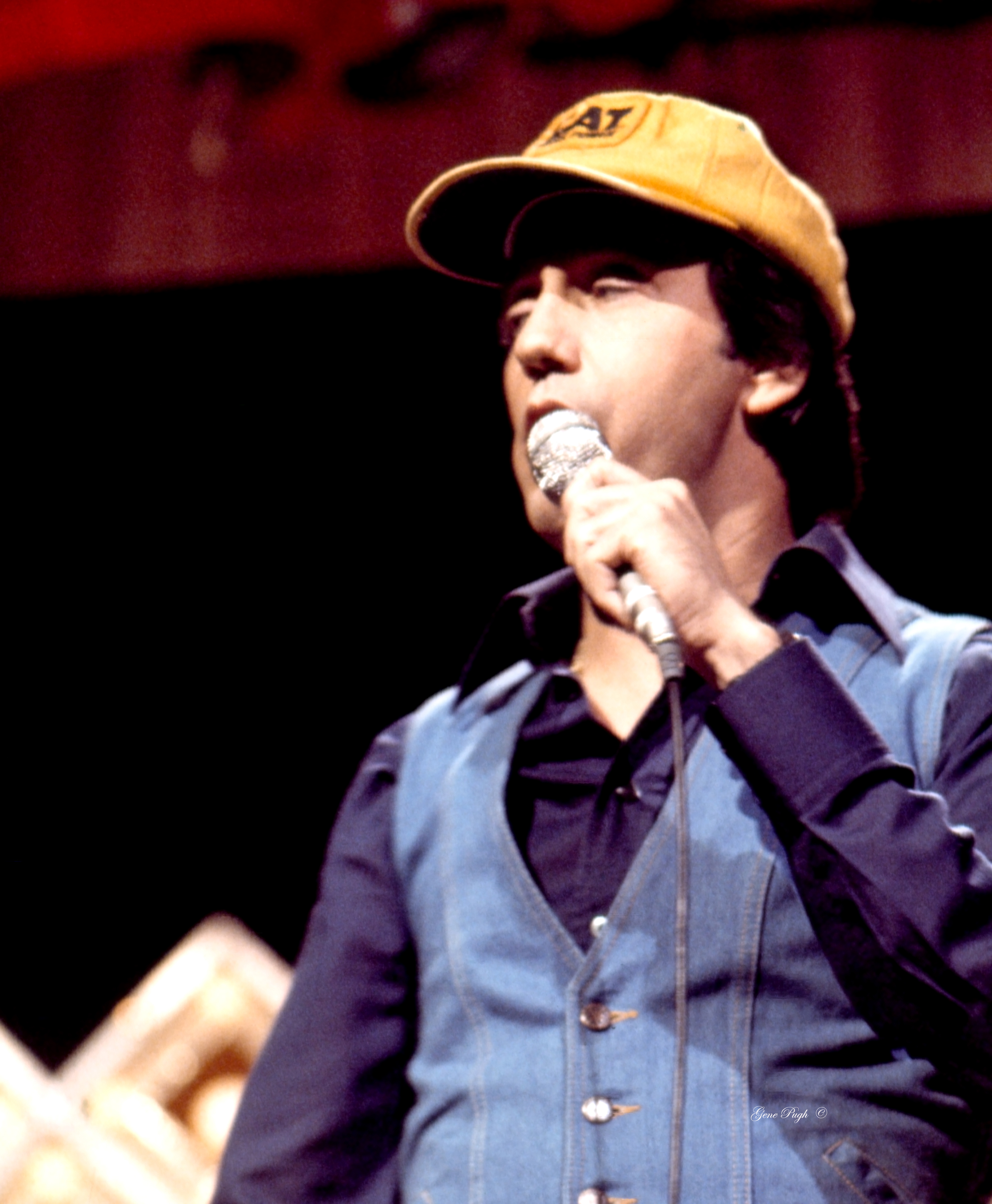
Ray Stevens gained his first number one with "Everything is Beautiful".

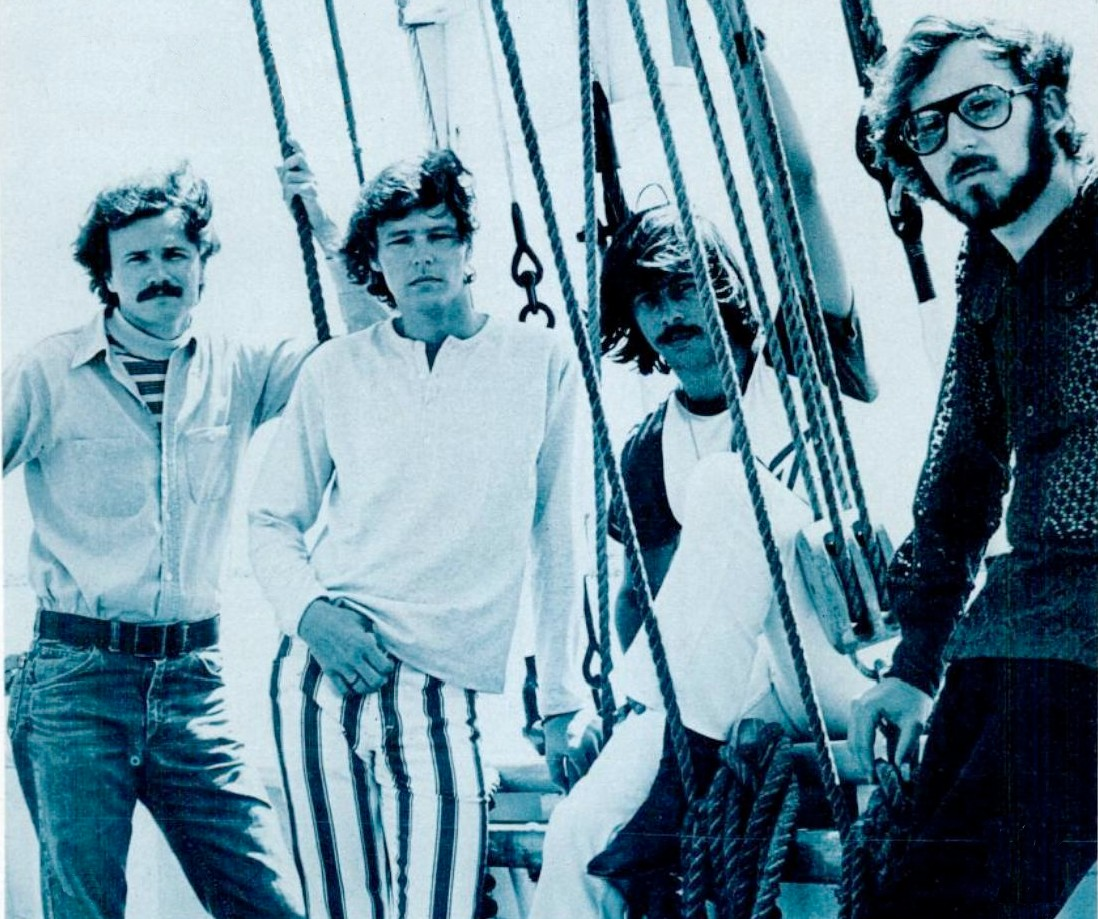
Bread topped the chart with "Make It with You".

Chart history
No. (Note: The "No." column indicates the numerical sequence of number ones in Hot 100 history.)	Issue date	Title	Artist(s)	Ref.
227	January 3	"Raindrops Keep Fallin' on My Head"	B. J. Thomas	
227	January 10	"Raindrops Keep Fallin' on My Head"	B. J. Thomas	
227	January 17	"Raindrops Keep Fallin' on My Head"	B. J. Thomas	
227	January 24	"Raindrops Keep Fallin' on My Head"	B. J. Thomas	
228	January 31	"I Want You Back"	The Jackson 5	
229	February 7	"Venus"	Shocking Blue	
230	February 14	"Thank You (Falettinme Be Mice Elf Agin)" / "Everybody Is a Star" (Note: Double A-sided single)	Sly & the Family Stone	
230	February 21	"Thank You (Falettinme Be Mice Elf Agin)" / "Everybody Is a Star"	Sly & the Family Stone	
231	February 28	"Bridge over Troubled Water"	Simon & Garfunkel	
231	March 7	"Bridge over Troubled Water"	Simon & Garfunkel	
231	March 14	"Bridge over Troubled Water"	Simon & Garfunkel	
231	March 21	"Bridge over Troubled Water"	Simon & Garfunkel	
231	March 28	"Bridge over Troubled Water"	Simon & Garfunkel	
231	April 4	"Bridge over Troubled Water"	Simon & Garfunkel	
232	April 11	"Let It Be"	The Beatles	
232	April 18	"Let It Be"	The Beatles	
233	April 25	"ABC"	The Jackson 5	
233	May 2	"ABC"	The Jackson 5	
234	May 9	"American Woman" / "No Sugar Tonight"	The Guess Who	
234	May 16	"American Woman" / "No Sugar Tonight"	The Guess Who	
234	May 23	"American Woman" / "No Sugar Tonight"	The Guess Who	
235	May 30	"Everything Is Beautiful"	Ray Stevens	
235	June 6	"Everything Is Beautiful"	Ray Stevens	
236	June 13	"The Long and Winding Road" / "For You Blue"	The Beatles	
236	June 20	"The Long and Winding Road" / "For You Blue"	The Beatles	
237	June 27	"The Love You Save"	The Jackson 5	
237	July 4	"The Love You Save"	The Jackson 5	
238	July 11	"Mama Told Me (Not to Come)"	Three Dog Night	
238	July 18	"Mama Told Me (Not to Come)"	Three Dog Night	
239	July 25	"(They Long to Be) Close to You"	The Carpenters	
239	August 1	"(They Long to Be) Close to You"	The Carpenters	
239	August 8	"(They Long to Be) Close to You"	The Carpenters	
239	August 15	"(They Long to Be) Close to You"	The Carpenters	
240	August 22	"Make It with You"	Bread	
241	August 29	"War"	Edwin Starr	
241	September 5	"War"	Edwin Starr	
241	September 12	"War"	Edwin Starr	
242	September 19	"Ain't No Mountain High Enough"	Diana Ross	
242	September 26	"Ain't No Mountain High Enough"	Diana Ross	
242	October 3	"Ain't No Mountain High Enough"	Diana Ross	
243	October 10	"Cracklin' Rosie"	Neil Diamond	
244	October 17	"I'll Be There"	The Jackson 5	
244	October 24	"I'll Be There"	The Jackson 5	
244	October 31	"I'll Be There"	The Jackson 5	
244	November 7	"I'll Be There"	The Jackson 5	
244	November 14	"I'll Be There"	The Jackson 5	
245	November 21	"I Think I Love You"	The Partridge Family	
245	November 28	"I Think I Love You"	The Partridge Family	
245	December 5	"I Think I Love You"	The Partridge Family	
246	December 12	"The Tears of a Clown"	Smokey Robinson & the Miracles	
246	December 19	"The Tears of a Clown"	Smokey Robinson & the Miracles	
247	December 26	"My Sweet Lord" / "Isn't It a Pity"	George Harrison	

== Number-one artists ==
List of number-one artists by total weeks at number one
Weeks at No. 1	Artist
10	The Jackson 5
6	Simon & Garfunkel
4	B. J. Thomas
4	The Beatles
4	The Carpenters
3	The Guess Who
3	Edwin Starr
3	Diana Ross
3	The Partridge Family
2	Sly & the Family Stone
2	Ray Stevens
2	Three Dog Night
2	Smokey Robinson & the Miracles
1	Shocking Blue
1	Bread
1	Neil Diamond
1	George Harrison

== See also ==
- 1970 in music
- List of Cash Box Top 100 number-one singles of 1970
- List of Billboard number-one singles
- List of Billboard Hot 100 number-one singles of the 1970s
