= Charles Wright & the Watts 103rd Street Rhythm Band =

American soul and funk band

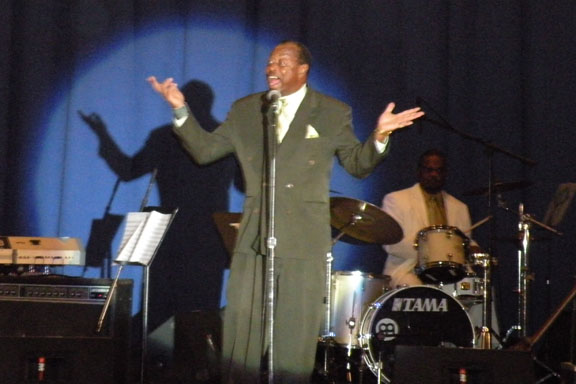
- Charles Wright performing at memorial tribute for the late founder of the Watts Summer Festival, Tommy Jacquette, on November 28, 2009.

Background information
- Also known as: The Soul Runners, Charles Wright & the Wright Sounds, The Watts 103rd Street Rhythm Band, Charles Wright
- Origin: Los Angeles, California, U.S.
- Genres: Soul; funk; R&B
- Years active: 1962–present
- Labels: MoSoul; Keymen; Warner Bros.
- Members: Charles Wright
- Past members: Benorce Blackmon; Bill Cannon; Melvin Dunlap; Gabriel Flemings; James Gadson; Ray Jackson; Al McKay; Big John Rayford
- Website: expressyourself.net

Charles Wright & the Watts 103rd Street Rhythm Band is an American soul and funk band. Formed in the early 1960s, they had the most visibility from 1967 to 1973 when the band had 9 singles reach Billboard's pop and/or rhythm and blues charts, such as "Do Your Thing", "Till You Get Enough", and "Love Land". They are best known for their biggest hit on Warner Bros. Records, 1970's "Express Yourself", a song that has been sampled by rap group N.W.A and others.

== History ==
=== Charles Wright and the Wright Sounds ===
Charles Wright was born on April 6, 1940, in Clarksdale, Mississippi. He moved to Los Angeles in the early 1950s, playing guitar and singing in several doo-wop groups including the Turks, the Twilighters, the Shields and the Gallahads. He also briefly worked in A&R for Del-Fi Records and was responsible for the 1961 hit record "Those Oldies but Goodies (Remind Me of You)" by Little Caesar & the Romans. In 1962, he formed his own band, Charles Wright & the Wright Sounds, which included future Watts Band member John Rayford, along with Daryl Dragon, later known as the "Captain" of Captain & Tennille. Over the course of the next six years, Wright added more musicians to his group and these were the players who would eventually become known as the Watts 103rd Street Rhythm Band, at least by 1968. Several of those members, including drummer James Gadson, bassist Melvin Dunlap, trombonist/arranger Ray Jackson, and both guitarists Al McKay and Benorce Blackmon, played on several Dyke and the Blazers charting singles, including "We Got More Soul" (1969) and "Let a Woman Be a Woman, Let a Man Be a Man" (1969).

The Wright Sounds played in several venues across Los Angeles, but their best known stint was three years (ending in 1968) at Hollywood's Haunted House nightclub. Originally located at Hollywood and Vine, the Haunted House was a popular club in the 1960s and appears in several popular culture artifacts, most notably the 1969 go-go dancing B-movie, Girl in Gold Boots.

=== First Watts 103rd Band ===
The name, Watts 103rd Street Rhythm Band was originally coined by Los Angeles record producer, and Keymen Records owner, Fred Smith in 1967. However, between 1967 and 1968, the Watts 103rd name applied to three, arguably four different personnel configurations, before settling into the final band, who played on every Watts 103rd album from 1968 onwards.

Smith produced a theme song for KGFJ radio personality, DJ Magnificent Montague. The song became so popular that Smith released it as a single in 1967 and created the name Watts 103rd St. Rhythm Band for the studio group who had recorded it. Purportedly, the players on the single included Wright, James Carmichael, Leon Haywood, and Bobby Womack.

There is some confusion because, after "Spreadin' Honey" became a success, Montague re-released the single on the MoSoul label (a Keyman subsidiary), and credited to a different group altogether, the Soul Runners. It has been long assumed that the Soul Runners were simply an earlier line-up of the Watts Band however, according to Wright, the two groups had nothing to do with one another whatsoever.

=== Second Watts 103rd Band ===
In 1966, Carmichael and Wright were both working as session players for the Nashville West recording studio. Their group of studio players was discovered by Fred Smith and comedian Bill Cosby who needed a backing band for his upcoming album, Silver Throat. Smith hired the Nashville West players and gave them the Watts 103rd name. This group included (but was not necessarily limited to): Arthur Wright (bass), Pete Fox (guitar), Streamline Ewing (trombone), Herman Riley (tenor sax), Jackie Kelso (tenor sax), Melvin Jernigan (tenor sax), Mel Brown (guitar), and Abraham Mills (drums).

Due to their association with Cosby, the new Watts 103rd band landed a deal with Warner Bros. Records, becoming the first R&B band to sign with them. They released a debut album in 1967. Technically self-titled, the album has also come to be called Hot Heat and Sweet Groove after a sub-title found on the back cover. "Spreadin' Honey" was included on this album, per Warner Bros. insistence, even though none of the players on the album, save for Wright, had actually played on the "Spreadin' Honey" single.

Wright generally disavows this album as a true Watts 103rd project, preferring to describe the second album, Together as the "first" Watts 103rd LP.

=== Third Watts 103rd Band ===
When Cosby went on tour, Wright was put in charge with creating a Watts 103rd touring band, which included both the musicians he had recorded Hot Heat with, but also added in the Wright Sounds as well. The Haunted House also began to bill Wright and the Wright Sounds as the Watts 103rd St. Rhythm Band.

=== Final Watts 103rd Band ===
Creative disagreements led to Smith selling his interest in the group to Wright. Newly freed, Wright reformed the Watts 103rd exclusively out of his Wright Sounds players, and broke ties with the musicians that recorded Hot Heat.

A May 18, 1968, recording of a live session at the Haunted House, became the partial basis for the second Warner Bros. album, Together. That album yielded the group's first major national hit, "Do Your Thing."

Their next album, In the Jungle Babe, is best known for both "Love Land," an uptempo, doo-wop-influenced soul ballad, as well as "Comment," where Wright discussed the state of racial affairs in America. Though the album was credited to the Watts 103rd St. Rhythm Band, the singles from this album and the group's next two albums, would be listed under "Charles Wright and the Watts 103rd Street Rhythm Band".

In the band's early years, they were mostly known for playing covers of popular R&B hits but, by the late 1960s, the group began to create original songs, resulting in a sound that was, as Charles Wright put it, "the middle ground between Otis Redding and James Brown", reflecting the group's musical blend of different regional R&B and funk styles. Their experiments in long, loosely structured grooves, best heard on the Express Yourself and You're So Beautiful albums, could be heard as both influences on and influenced by contemporaries such as Sly and the Family Stone, the Isley Brothers and Parliament-Funkadelic.

=== Dissolution ===
As early as 1969, the Watts Band began to lose members. Al McKay left the Watts Band in 1969, and joined Earth, Wind & Fire. He was replaced by Benorce Blackmon. After recording the 1971, You're So Beautiful album, Gadson, Dunlap, Jackson, and Blackmon left the Watts Band to work with Bill Withers, playing on his albums Still Bill (1972) and Live at Carnegie Hall (1973).

Charles Wright went on to record four solo records after the departure of the Watts Band's core rhythm section, Rhythm and Poetry (1972), Doin' What Comes Naturally (1973), Ninety Day Cycle People (1974), and Lil' Encouragement (1975). In 2007, he released a new album, Finally Got It Wright, which includes an updated version of "Express Yourself."

"Express Yourself" was sampled by Los Angeles rap group N.W.A in 1988, and has been used for many soundtracks of movies, including Remember the Titans, Cheaper by the Dozen 2, and Mr. & Mrs. Smith, plus numerous television commercials. "Do Your Thing" was featured on the soundtrack to Boogie Nights. "65 Bars and a Taste of Soul" serves as the theme music for the Chuck character Roan Montgomery.

== Band members ==
- Charles Wright - vocals, guitar, piano
- Al McKay - guitar
- Benorce Blackmon - guitar (replaced Al McKay)
- Gabe Flemings - piano, trumpet
- Melvin Dunlap - bass
- James Gadson - drums
- Larry D. Cotton - drums
- Big John Rayford - saxophone
- Bill Cannon - saxophone
- Ray Jackson - trombone
- Leslie Milton Sr. - drums (replaced James Gadson)
- Yusuf Rahman - horns

== Discography ==
=== Albums ===
==== (As the Watts 103rd Street Rhythm Band) ====
Year	Album	Peak chart positions		Record label
Year	Album	US 200	US R&B	Record label
1967	Hot Heat and Sweet Groove	—	—	Warner Bros. Records
1968	Together	140	40	Warner Bros. Records
1969	In the Jungle, Babe	145	42	Warner Bros. Records
"—" denotes releases that did not chart.

==== (As Charles Wright and the Watts 103rd Street Rhythm Band) ====
Year	Album	Peak chart positions		Record label
Year	Album	US 200	US R&B	Record label
1970	Express Yourself	182	27	Warner Bros. Records
1971	You're So Beautiful	147	39	Warner Bros. Records

==== (As Charles Wright) ====
Year	Album	US R&B
1972	Rhythm & Poetry	—
1973	Doin' What Comes Naturally	45
1974	Ninety Day Cycle People	—
1975	Lil' Encouragement	—
2007	Finally Got It Wright	88
"—" denotes releases that did not chart.

=== Singles ===
==== (As the Soul Runners) ====
Year	Title	Peak chart positions		Record Label	B-side
Year	Title	US	US R&B	Record Label	B-side
1966	"Grits 'N Corn Bread"	—	33	MoSoul Records	"Spreadin' Honey"
1967	"Chittlin' Salad"	—	—	MoSoul Records	"Chittlin' Salad (Part II)"
1967	"Last Date"	—	—	MoSoul Records	"Charley"
"—" denotes releases that did not chart.

==== (As the Watts 103rd Street Rhythm Band) ====
Year	Title	Peak chart positions		Record Label	B-side	Album
Year	Title	US	US R&B	Record Label	B-side	Album
1967	"Spreadin' Honey"	73	44	Keymen Records	"Charley"	Hot Heat and Sweet Groove
1968	"Brown Sugar"	—	—	Warner Bros. Records	"Caesar's Palace"	Hot Heat and Sweet Groove
1968	"Bottomless"	—	—	Warner Bros. Records	"65 Bars and a Taste of Soul"	
1968	"Do Your Thing"	11	12	Warner Bros. Records	"A Dance, a Kiss and a Song"	Together
1969	"Till You Get Enough"	67	12	Warner Bros. Records	"Light My Fire"	In the Jungle, Babe
"—" denotes releases that did not chart.

==== (As Charles Wright and the Watts 103rd Street Rhythm Band) ====
Year	Title	Peak chart positions		Record Label	B-side	Album
Year	Title	US	US R&B	Record Label	B-side	Album
1969	"Must Be Your Thing"	—	35	Warner Bros. Records	"Comment"	In the Jungle, Babe
1970	"Love Land"	16	23	Warner Bros. Records	"Sorry Charlie"	In the Jungle, Babe
1970	"Express Yourself"	12	3	Warner Bros. Records	"Living on Borrowed Time"	Express Yourself
1970	"Solution for Pollution"	96	—	Warner Bros. Records	"High as Apple Pie"	
1971	"Your Love (Means Everything to Me)"	73	9	Warner Bros. Records	"What Can You Bring Me"	You're So Beautiful
1971	"Nobody Tellin' Me About My Baby"	—	—	Warner Bros. Records	"Wine"	
1972	"I Got Your Love"	—	—	Warner Bros. Records	"Let's Make Love - Not War"	You're So Beautiful
"—" denotes releases that did not chart.

==== (As Charles Wright) ====
Year	Title	Peak chart positions		Record Label	B-side	Album
Year	Title	US	US R&B	Record Label	B-side	Album
1966	"Help Yourself"	—	—	Capitol Records	"Number One"	
1966	"(I'm Living on) Borrowed Time"	—	—	Philips Records	"Keep Saying (You Don't Love Nobody)"	
1970	"(I'm Living on) Borrowed Time"	—	—	Philips Records	"Keep Saying (You Don't Love Nobody)"	
1972	"Soul Train"	—	—	Warner Bros. Records	"Run Jody Run"	Rhythm and Poetry
1972	"You Gotta Know Whatcha Doin'"	—	—	Warner Bros. Records	"Here Comes the Sun"	
1973	"(Well I'm) Doin' What Cums Naturally; Part 1"	—	27	Dunhill Records	"(Well I'm) Doin' What Cums Naturally; Part 2"	Doing What Comes Naturally
1975	"Is It Real?"	—	—	Dunhill Records	"Don't Rush Tomorrow"	Ninety Day Cycle People
"—" denotes releases that did not chart.
