= The Chi-Lites discography =

Discography of American R&B/soul vocal group The Chi-Lites

- Studio albums: 18
- Compilation albums: 15
- Singles: 64
- No. 1 Singles: 1
- Top 10 Singles: 12

This is the discography of American R&B/soul vocal group The Chi-Lites.

== Albums ==
=== Studio albums ===
Year	Album	Peak chart positions		Record label
Year	Album	US	US R&B	Record label
1969	Give It Away	180	16	Brunswick
1970	I Like Your Lovin' (Do You Like Mine?)	—	—	Brunswick
1971	(For God's Sake) Give More Power to the People	12	3	Brunswick
1972	A Lonely Man	5	1	Brunswick
1973	A Letter to Myself	50	4	Brunswick
1973	Chi-Lites	89	3	Brunswick
1974	Toby	181	12	Brunswick
1975	Half a Love	—	41	Brunswick
1976	Happy Being Lonely	—	—	Mercury
1977	The Fantastic Chi-Lites	—	—	Mercury
1980	Heavenly Body	179	42	Chi-Sound
1981	Love Your Way Through	—	—	Excello
1982	Me and You	162	31	Chi-Sound
1983	Bottom's Up	98	15	Larc
1984	Steppin' Out	—	46	Private I
1990	Just Say You Love Me	—	77	Ichiban
1998	Help Wanted	—	—	Copper Sun
2001	Low Key	—	—	Mar-ance
"—" denotes a recording that did not chart or was not released in that territory.

=== Compilation albums ===
Year	Album	Peak chart positions		Record label
Year	Album	US	US R&B	Record label
1972	Greatest Hits	55	4	Brunswick
1976	Greatest Hits, Vol. 2	—	—	Brunswick
1983	Greatest Hits	—	—	Epic
1991	The Very Best of The Chi-Lites	—	—	Music Club
1992	Greatest Hits	—	—	Rhino
1996	Inner City Blues	—	—	Brunswick
1996	Greatest Hits, Vol. 2	—	—	Rhino
1998	Too Good to Be Forgotten	—	—	Demon
1998	Remembered	—	—	UMG
1998	Hit Highlights from The Chi-Lites	—	—	Diablo UK
1999	Have You Seen Her: Their Greatest Hits	—	—	Hallmark Recordings (UK)
2001	20 Greatest Hits	—	—	Brunswick
2002	The Best of The Chi-Lites	—	—	EMI-Capitol
2002	Have You Seen Her	—	—	Pure Gold/Disky Europe
2003	The Best of The Chi-Lites	—	—	Collectables
2006	The Ultimate Chi-Lites	—	—	Brunswick
"—" denotes a recording that did not chart or was not released in that territory.

== Singles ==
Year	Title	Peak chart positions					
Year	Title	US	US R&B	AUS	CAN	IRE	UK
1964	"You Did That to Me" (credited as The Hi-Lites)	—	—	—	—	—	—
1965	"I'm So Jealous"	—	—	—	—	—	—
1965	"Ain't You Glad (Winter's Over)"	—	—	—	—	—	—
1965	"Never No More"	—	—	—	—	—	—
1966	"Pretty Girl" (credited as Mashall & The Chi-Lites)	—	—	—	—	—	—
1967	"Price of Love" (credited as Mashall & The Chi-Lites)	—	—	—	—	—	—
1967	"Love Me"	—	—	—	—	—	—
1968	"(Um, Um) My Baby Loves Me"	—	—	—	—	—	—
1969	"Give It Away"	88	10	—	—	—	—
1969	"Let Me Be the Man My Daddy Was" (A-side)	94	15	—	—	—	—
1969	"The Twelfth of Never" (B-side)	—	47	—	—	—	—
1969	"To Change My Love"	—	—	—	—	—	—
1970	"24 Hours of Sadness"	—	30	—	—	—	—
1970	"I Like Your Lovin' (Do You Like Mine)"	72	11	—	—	—	—
1970	"Are You My Woman? (Tell Me So)"	72	8	—	—	—	—
1971	"(For God's Sake) Give More Power to the People"	26	4	—	63	—	32
1971	"We Are Neighbors"	70	17	—	—	—	—
1971	"I Want to Pay You Back (For Loving Me)"	95	35	—	—	—	—
1971	"Have You Seen Her"	3	1	—	47	11	3
1972	"Oh Girl"	1	1	58	9	—	14
1972	"The Coldest Days of My Life (Part 1)"	47	8	—	—	—	—
1972	"A Lonely Man" (A-side)	57	25	—	—	—	—
1972	"The Man & the Woman (The Boy & the Girl)" (B-side)	57	—	—	—	—	—
1972	"We Need Order"	61	13	—	—	—	—
1973	"A Letter to Myself"	33	3	—	—	—	—
1973	"My Heart Just Keeps on Breakin'"	92	46	—	—	—	—
1973	"Stoned Out of My Mind"	30	2	—	—	—	53 (Note: Chart position is from the official UK "Breakers List".)
1973	"I Found Sunshine"	47	17	—	—	—	35
1974	"Homely Girl"	54	3	—	98	10	5
1974	"There Will Never Be Any Peace (Until God Is Seated at the Conference Table)"	63	8	—	—	—	—
1974	"You Got to Be the One"	83	15	—	—	—	—
1974	"Too Good to Be Forgotten"	—	—	—	—	—	10
1974	"Toby" (A-side)	78	7	—	—	—	54
1974	"That's How Long" (B-side)	78	7	—	—	—	—
1975	"I Forgot to Say I Love You Till I'm Gone"	—	—	—	—	—	58
1975	"Have You Seen Her" / "Oh Girl" (re-release)	—	—	—	—	11	5
1975	"It's Time for Love" (A-side)	94	27	—	—	12	5
1975	"Here I Am" (B-side)	—	87	—	—	—	—
1975	"Don't Burn No Bridges" (with Jackie Wilson)	—	91	—	—	—	—
1976	"The Devil Is Doing His Work"	—	32	—	—	—	—
1976	"You Don't Have to Go"	—	50	—	—	13	3
1976	"Happy Being Lonely"	—	30	—	—	—	59
1977	"Vanishing Love" (A-side)	—	95	—	—	—	—
1977	"I Turn Away" (B-side)	—	95	—	—	—	—
1977	"My First Mistake"	—	63	—	—	—	—
1977	"If I Had a Girl"	—	87	—	—	—	—
1978	"The First Time (Ever I Saw Your Face)"	—	—	—	—	—	—
1979	"Higher"	—	—	—	—	—	—
1980	"The Only One for Me (One in a Million)"	—	—	—	—	—	—
1980	"Heavenly Body"	—	36	—	—	—	—
1981	"Have You Seen Her" (re-recorded version)	—	48	—	—	—	—
1981	"All I Wanna Do Is Make Love to You"	—	—	—	—	—	—
1981	"Me and You"	—	70	—	—	—	—
1982	"Hot on a Thing (Called Love)"	—	15	—	—	—	—
1982	"Try My Side (Of Love)"	—	—	—	—	—	—
1983	"Bottom's Up"	—	7	—	—	—	—
1983	"Bad Motor Scooter"	—	28	—	—	—	—
1983	"Have You Seen Her" (re-release)	—	—	—	—	—	100
1983	"Changing for You"	—	—	—	—	—	61
1984	"Stop What You're Doin'"	—	33	—	—	—	—
1984	"Gimme Whatcha Got"	—	41	—	—	—	—
1985	"Hard Act to Follow"	—	—	—	—	—	—
1990	"There's a Change"	—	—	—	—	—	—
1997	"Help Wanted (Heroes Are in Short Supply)"	—	95	—	—	—	—
1998	"Hold on to Your Dreams"	—	93	—	—	—	—
"—" denotes a recording that did not chart or was not released in that territory.
