= A Letter to Myself =

Studio album by The Chi-Lites
- Released: March 1973
- Genre: R&B, soul
- Length: 46:23
- Label: Brunswick
- Producer: Eugene Record

The Chi-Lites chronology
| Greatest Hits (1972) | A Letter to Myself (1973) | Chi-Lites (1973) |

Professional ratings
Review scores
| Source | Rating |
|---|---|
| Allmusic | 2.5/5 stars |

A Letter to Myself is the fifth studio album by American soul group The Chi-Lites, produced and largely written by lead singer Eugene Record. The album was released in 1973 on the Brunswick label.

== History ==
The first single released from the album was "We Need Order" and the song peaked at #13 on the R&B chart and #61 on Billboard Hot 100. The title track was released as the second single and peaked at #3 on the R&B chart and #33 on the Billboard Hot 100. The album was the third of four consecutive Chi-Lites albums to make the R&B top 5 (reaching #4), but has only a moderate critical reputation, with none of the tracks being considered as strong as the highlights on (For God's Sake) Give More Power to the People or A Lonely Man.

== Track listing ==
Side one
| No. | Title | Writer(s) | Length |
|---|---|---|---|
| 1. | "A Letter to Myself" | Eugene Record, Sandra Drayton | 5:30 |
| 2. | "Too Late to Turn Back Now" | Eddie Cornelius | 4:25 |
| 3. | "Just Two Teenage Kids (Still in Love)" | Eugene Record, Barbara Acklin, Carl Davis | 5:56 |
| 4. | "Sally" | Eugene Record, Sandra Drayton | 3:36 |
| 5. | "Someone Else's Arms" | Eugene Record, Barbara Acklin | 4:11 |

Side two
| No. | Title | Writer(s) | Length |
|---|---|---|---|
| 6. | "We Need Order" | Eugene Record, Quinton Joseph | 5:20 |
| 7. | "Love Comes in All Sizes" | Eugene Record | 5:58 |
| 8. | "My Heart Just Keeps on Breakin'" | Eugene Record, Stan McKinney | 4:05 |
| 9. | "You Smiled the Same Old Way" | Eugene Record | 6:40 |

== Personnel ==
- Eugene Record, Marshall Thompson, Robert "Squirrel" Lester, Creadel "Red" Jones – vocals
- Thomas (Tom Tom) Washington – piano
- Arthur Hoyle, Raymond Orr, Murray Watson – trumpets
- Murray Watson, Raymond Orr – flugelhorn
- Cliff Davis – baritone saxophone, flute, tenor saxophone, alto saxophone
- Gene Barge – alto saxophone
- Frank Robinson – tenor saxophone, flute
- William A. Adkins – tenor saxophone, piccolo
- Morris Ellis – trombone, bass trombone
- Ethel Merker, Julia M. Studebaker – French horn
- Bobby Christian, Floyd Morris – marimba, tympani, orchestra bells
- Floyd Morris – cello
- Sol Bobrov, Elliot Golab, Edward Green, Gerasim Warutian, Frank Borgognone, Roger Moulton, Johnny Frigo – violins
- Carl Fruh, Roger Malitz, Emil Mittermann – viola
- Eugene Record – electric bass, organ, electric guitar
- William Robinson – electric bass
- Rufus Reid – upright bass
- Cy Touff – harmonica
- Danny Reid – electric guitar
- Ron Steele – acoustic guitar
- Quinton Joseph – drums

== Production ==
- Eugene Record – producer
- Thomas (Tom Tom) Washington – arranger, conductor, associate producer
- Bruce Swedien – audio engineer, associate producer
- Quinton Joseph – associate producer, director
- Willie Henderson – director
- William Sanders – arranger

== Charts ==
| Chart (1973) | Peak |
|---|---|
| U.S. Billboard Top LPs | 50 |
| U.S. Billboard Top Soul LPs | 4 |

Singles

| Year | Single | Peak chart positions | |
| Year | Single | US | US R&B |
|---|---|---|---|
| 1972 | "We Need Order" | 61 | 13 |
| 1973 | "A Letter to Myself" | 33 | 3 |
| 1973 | "My Heart Just Keeps on Breakin'" | 92 | 46 |
