= Marshall Thompson (singer) =

American singer and musician (born 1942)

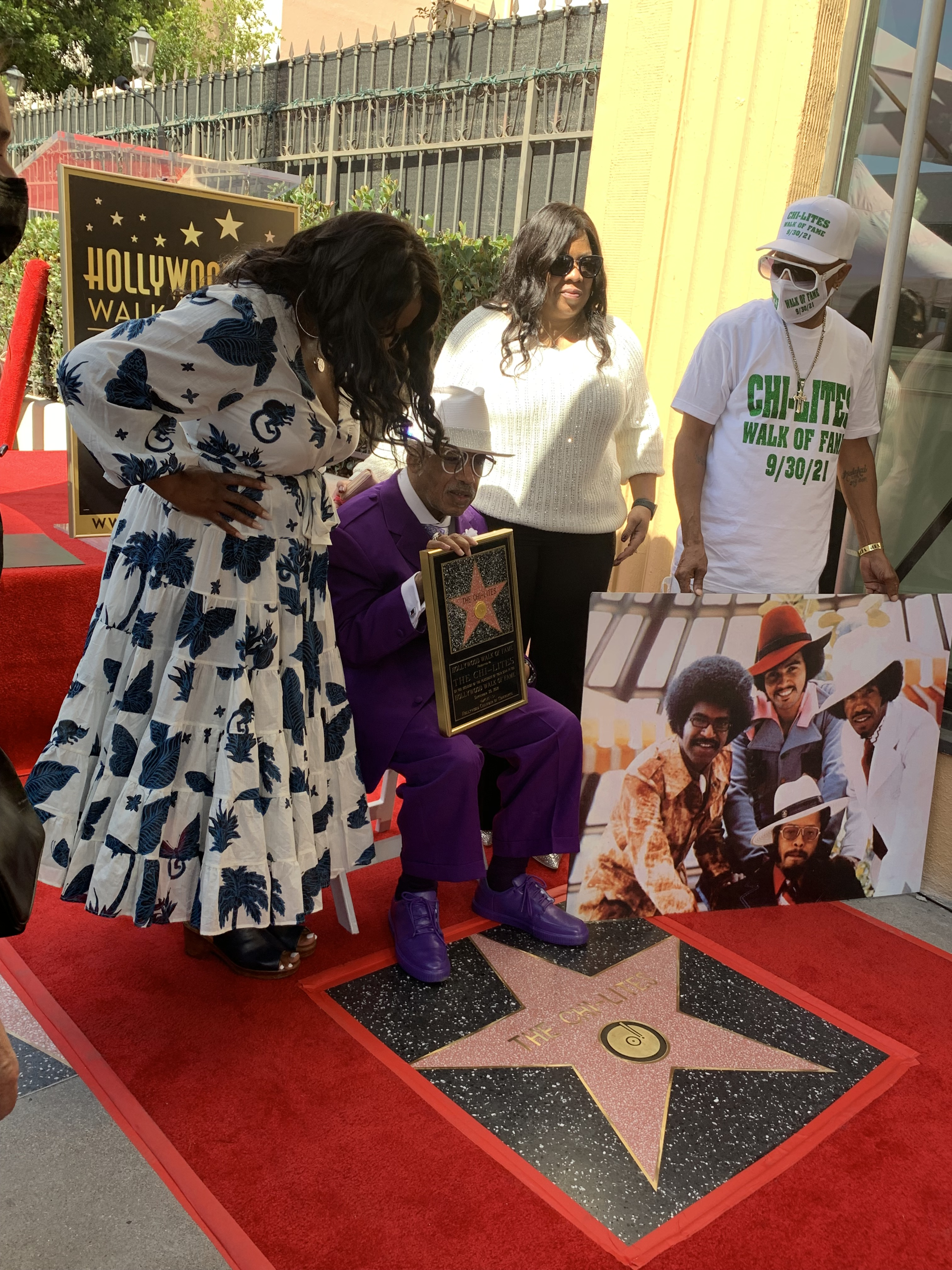
- Thompson on September 30, 2021 at the Hollywood Walk of Fame.

Background information
- Born: Marshall Thompson; August 24, 1942 (age 84); Chicago, Illinois, United States
- Genres: R&B; Soul; Pop
- Occupations: Singer; musician
- Instruments: Vocals; drums; harmonica; melodica
- Years active: 1964–Present
- Member of: The Chi-Lites
- Website: chi-lites.info

Marshall Thompson (born August 24, 1942), is an American singer and musician. Thompson is best known as an original member of the Chicago, Illinois–based Soul/R&B vocal group The Chi-Lites. Their songs included Pop and R&B hits" Oh Girl", "Have You Seen Her", "The Coldest Days of My Life (Part 1)", "Stoned Out of My Mind" and "(For God's Sake) Give More Power to the People". Twenty-one of their recordings appeared on the Billboard Hot 100 Pop Chart and thirty-nine appeared on Billboard Soul/R&B Chart, with 11 making the Top Ten list.

== Biography ==
=== Early life and education ===
Thompson was born in Chicago, Illinois on August 24, 1942, to musician William "Nose" Thompson and Mary Thompson. His father, a pianist played with Redd Foxx, and musicians Joe Williams and Henry Red Allen Orchestra at the Apollo and The Cotton Club. Thompson's father is credited under the name Bill Williams on several recordings for Allen in the 1940s. Thompson grew up on the south side of Chicago. Thompson's uncle, whom he's named after taught him how to play drums at an early age. For high school, Thompson first attended Hyde Park Academy High School and later transferred to DuSable High School where he studied music under the direction of notable music teacher, Captain Walter Dyett.

=== Career ===
While still in high school, Thompson along with Creadel "Red" Jones were part of a vocal group, The Desideros before joining The Hi-Lites whose members included Eugene Record, Robert "Squirrel" Lester, and Clarence Johnson in 1959. In 1964, The Hi-Lites recorded a song entitled, "You Did That to Me", but soon changed their name due to prior use by another group. To honor their hometown, they change their name to Marshall & The Chi-Lites and recorded the single, "Pretty Girl" in 1966. Soon after they changed their name to The Chi-Lites in 1967.

In 1967, Thompson landed a position with the house band at the Regal Theater in Chicago as drummer and played for Gladys Knight & The Pips while they were performing a two-week stint there. He also traveled with singer Major Lance as a drummer. In late 1968, The Chi-Lites got their big break when they signed a recording contract with Brunswick Records out of Chicago. They recorded their first charting single, "Give It Away" and "Let Me Be The Man My Daddy Was" in 1969.

Between 1970 and 1974 The Chi-Lites were on a roll recording hit after hit including "I Like Your Lovin' (Do You Like Mine)" No. 11, "Are You My Woman? (Tell Me So)" No. 8, "(For God's Sake) Give More Power to the People" No. 4, "Have You Seen Her" No. 1 and (No. 3 Pop), "Oh Girl" No. 1 Pop and R&B, "The Coldest Days of My Life (Part 1)" No. 8, "A Letter to Myself" No. 3, "Stoned Out of My Mind", No. 2, "Homely Girl" No. 3, "Toby" No. 7, and "That's How Long" No. 7. In 1973, Jones left the group and was replaced by Stanley Anderson, who was soon replaced by Willie Kensey. By 1977, Record who was lead singer and wrote most of the hits for The Chi-Lites, left to pursue a solo career. The Chi-Lites continued on with Thompson, Lester and new member Doc Roberson who replaced Kensey. In 1980, Thompson and Lester were reunited with Jones, and continued touring as a trio with Lester as the lead singer. Record soon rejoined the group and stayed until the mid-1980s. Original member Creadel "Red" Jones died on August 25, 1994, at age 53.

=== Recent years ===
Thompson along with Lester kept the group together with a different line-up performing on the Classic Soul circuit and corporate events. In 2003, Thompson released two singles, "Low Key" and "Still In My Head" on Mar-Ance Records. Beyonce sampled The Chi-Lites song "Are You My Women (Tell Me So)" for her hit Grammy winning single, "Crazy In Love", with Thompson playing congas on the track. Original lead singer and songwriter Eugene Record died in 2005. Original member Robert "Squirrel" Lester died in 2010. By 2011, Thompson was the last man standing from The Chi-Lites original lineup. He released the single, "Hold On To Your Dreams" on Mar-Ance Records.

In 2014, while on the Soul Train Cruise, Thompson suffered a stroke after a performance with The Chi-Lites. That same year, Thompson was featured on TV One's Unsung episode, The Story of The Chi-Lites. Thompson also released his book, "The Last Man Standing", in November of that year.

Thompson, in 2019 received a Broadcast Music Inc. (BMI) Award for The Chi-Lites song "Oh Girl" placing No. 36 for song of the century (1900 - 1999). The BMI announcement was made on December 13, 1999. On September 4, 2019, singer Jackie Wilson posthumously received a Hollywood Walk of Fame Star and Thompson was one of the guest speakers at the ceremony. Wilson was a label mate of Thompson on Brunswick Records. As of 2020, Thompson is continuing The Chi-Lites' legacy as the last surviving member. On June 17, 2020, Hollywood Walk of Fame announced their Class of 2021 was to receive stars on Hollywood Blvd., and The Chi-Lites were named as one of the honorees. On September 30, 2021, Thompson was honored with the 2,702nd star on the Hollywood Walk of Fame as a member of The Chi-Lites. Actor and comedian Jimmie Walker and radio personality Jeff Foxx were the Presenters.

=== Personal life ===
Thompson married three times and has fifteen children. In 1961, Thompson married Jeweletta Thomas. Thompson second marriage was to Constance Strong in 1976. In 1997, Strong died in a car accident while traveling back from a performance with The Chi-Lites. Since 2001, Thompson has been married Tara Thompson who sings with the current Chi-Lites lineup. In addition to his 15 children, Thompson has 35 grandchildren and 39 great-grandchildren. Thompson still resides in his hometown of Chicago, Illinois.

== Discography ==
=== With The Chi-Lites ===
- See The Chi-Lites discography

=== Solo artist ===
- "Low Key" - 2003 / Mar-Ance Records
- "Still In My Head" - 2003 / Mar-Ance Records
- "Hold On To Your Dreams" - 2011 / / Mar-Ance Records
