= Greatest Hits (The Chi-Lites album) =

Compilation album by The Chi-Lites
- Released: October 1972
- Genre: R&B, soul
- Length: 59:33
- Label: Brunswick
- Producer: Eugene Record

The Chi-Lites chronology
A Lonely Man (1972)	Greatest Hits (1972)	A Letter to Myself (1973)

Professional ratings
Review scores
Source	Rating
Christgau's Record Guide	A

Greatest Hits is the first compilation album by American soul group The Chi-Lites. The album was released in 1972 on the Brunswick label.

== Track listing ==
Side one
No.	Title	Writer(s)	Length
1.	"Oh Girl"	Eugene Record	3:48
2.	"I Wanna Pay You Back"	Eugene Record	2:56
3.	"I Like Your Lovin' (Do You Like Mine)"	Eugene Record, Sandy Wilburn	3:36
4.	"Give It Away"	Eugene Record, Carl Davis	2:50
5.	"Let Me Be the Man My Daddy Was"	Eugene Record, Barbara Acklin	3:33
6.	"Love Uprising"	Eugene Record	2:32
7.	"The Coldest Days of My Life (Part I)"	Eugene Record, Carl Davis	4:27
8.	"The Coldest Days of My Life (Part II)"	Eugene Record, Carl Davis	4:15

Side two
No.	Title	Writer(s)	Length
9.	"Have You Seen Her"	Eugene Record, Barbara Acklin	5:10
10.	"(For God's Sake) Give More Power to the People"	Eugene Record	3:50
11.	"Are You My Woman"	Eugene Record	3:06
12.	"We Are Neighbors"	Eugene Record, Quinton Joseph	3:39
13.	"Living in the Footsteps of Another Man"	Samuel Graner, James Smith	2:57
14.	"I'm Ready If I Don't Get To Go"	Eugene Record, Revé Gipson	4:21
15.	"24 Hours Of Sadness"	Eugene Record, Carl Davis	2:11
16.	"A Lonely Man"	Eugene Record, J. Edward Haycraft	6:23

== Charts ==
Chart (1972)	Peak
U.S. Billboard Top LPs	55
U.S. Billboard Top Soul LPs	4

== Other editions ==
Brunswick also released a 13-track edition in discrete 4-channel Quadraphonic as a 7 ½ ips Reel-To-Reel with the catalog number BRU J 14184. This version left off the following three songs: "Give It Away", "The Coldest Days Of My Life (Part 2)", or "24 Hours Of Sadness". This shortened version of the compilation used the same 16 disc front cover art as the standard LP release.
