= I Like Your Lovin' (Do You Like Mine?) =

Studio album by The Chi-Lites
- Released: December 1970
- Genre: R&B, soul
- Length: 29:05
- Label: Brunswick
- Producer: Eugene Record

The Chi-Lites chronology
Give It Away (1969)	I Like Your Lovin' (Do You Like Mine?) (1970)	(For God's Sake) Give More Power to the People (1971)

Singles from I Like Your Lovin' (Do You Like Mine?)
- 1. "Are You My Woman? (Tell Me So)" Released: 1970

Professional ratings
Review scores
Source	Rating
AllMusic	3/5 stars

I Like Your Lovin' (Do You Like Mine?) (Note: Original issues had the title written as I Like Your Lovin' (Do You Like Mine) (without the question mark after "Mine").) is the second studio album by American soul group The Chi-Lites, produced and largely written by lead singer Eugene Record. The album was released in 1970 on the Brunswick label.

== History ==
Although the album is always categorized in discographies as an original release, it contains only three new tracks, the remaining seven being recycled from the group's 1969 debut album Give It Away. It is believed that Brunswick decided to release the album in this form due to the group not having recorded enough material for a completely new album at the time the title track was released as a single. (This strategy would be repeated in 1975, when the group's album Half a Love was released with a near-even split of new and previously released tracks). It was an unsuccessful move, as I Like You Lovin' (Do You Like Mine?) is the only Chi-Lites album for Brunswick which failed to register in the top 100 of either the R&B or the pop chart.

"Are You My Woman? (Tell Me So)", a moderate hit at the time of its original single release, has since become one of the group's best-known tracks after its horn riff was sampled heavily on Beyoncé's 2003 global bestseller "Crazy in Love".

== Track listing ==
Side one
No.	Title	Writer(s)	Length
1.	"Are You My Woman? (Tell Me So)"	Eugene Record	3:02
2.	"Troubles A' Comin"	Eugene Record	3:19
3.	"24 Hours of Sadness"	Eugene Record, Carl Davis	2:04
4.	"The Twelfth of Never"	Jerry Livingston, Paul Francis Webster	2:44
5.	"Let Me Be the Man My Daddy Was"	Eugene Record, Barbara Acklin	3:43

Side two
No.	Title	Writer(s)	Length
6.	"I Like Your Lovin' (Do You Like Mine)"	Eugene Record, Sandy Wilburn	2:48
7.	"I'm Gonna Make You Love Me"	Ken Gamble, Jerry Ross, Jerry Williams	2:31
8.	"Give It Away"	Eugene Record, Carl Davis	2:47
9.	"My Whole World Ended"	Johnny Bristol, Harvey Fuqua, Pamela Joan Sawyer, Jimmy Roach	3:08
10.	"You're No Longer Part of My Heart"	Eugene Record	3:00

- Tracks 3–5, 7–10 also appear on Give It Away

== Personnel ==
- Marshall Thompson – baritone vocals
- Robert "Squirrel" Lester – second tenor vocals
- Creadel "Red" Jones – bass vocals
- Eugene Record – producer, arranger, tenor/baritone vocals
- Sonny Sanders – arranger
- The Peoples' Paraphernalia – arrangers
- Willie Henderson – director

== Charts ==
Singles
Year	Single	Peak chart positions	
Year	Single	US	US R&B
1970	"I Like Your Lovin' (Do You Like Mine)"	72	11
1970	"Are You My Woman? (Tell Me So)"	72	8
