= Nat Tarnopol =

American record producer

- Nat Tarnopol at Bell Sound Studios in 1960
- Born: January 26, 1931; Detroit, Michigan, U.S.
- Died: December 25, 1987 (aged 56)
- Occupation: American record producer

Nat Tarnopol (January 26, 1931 – December 25, 1987) was an American record producer. He played a vital role in producing and shaping R&B music throughout the 1960s and 1970s as the president of Brunswick Records, a subsidiary label of Decca Records. Responsible for launching the careers of The Chi-Lites, Jackie Wilson, Tyrone Davis, Barbara Acklin and The Young-Holt Unlimited, Tarnopol scored 150 songs on the Billboard charted singles between 1957 and 1981.

== Early life ==
Tarnopol was the younger of two sons born to first generation Americans from Eastern Europe on January 26, 1931, in Detroit, Michigan. As a young man, Tarnopol's two passions were baseball and R&B music. His mother, Pearl Tarnopol, died shortly after his twelfth birthday, which forced Tarnopol to spend the remainder of his childhood in the home of his Aunt Lena. His parents originally wanted him to become a rabbi. As a star shortstop, Tarnopol was scouted by, and was offered deals to sign with, both the Detroit Tigers and the Chicago White Sox. Tarnopol passed on both offers. Without money for college, Tarnopol took a job with Detroit's Union Tire company and began spending his spare time at the Flame Show Bar in Detroit's Black Bottom district.

In a late-fifties interview, Detroit's most popular deejay, Mickey Shorr gave Tarnopol credit for leading him toward rock 'n' roll music. After Mickey had spent a few nights playing the same white pop records as everyone else, a tire salesman and part-time song plugger named Nat Tarnopol dropped by the station. Tarnopol was white but he loved r&b music and spent a lot of time hanging around Al Green's Flame Show Bar, a showcase for black entertainment in the Motor City. Shorr said "Nat came in and said, 'Mickey, I haven't got a single song that is any good right now, but I want to give you a tip-get with rock 'n' roll music'. Tarnopol came down to the JBK studios every evening for a couple of months and helped pick the records." Shorr became the first Detroit deejay to ever play an Elvis Presley recording.

== Jackie Wilson ==
It was at the Flame Show Bar in 1956 where Tarnopol met and began working with Al Green (not be confused with singer Al Green or Albert "Al" Green of the now defunct National Records), who owned the club and managed Atlantic Recording artist LaVern Baker, as well as singers Johnnie Ray and Little Willie John. At Tarnopol's insistence, Green signed a management contract with a young Jackie Wilson, who had decided to leave Billy Ward and the Dominoes for a solo career. By the time Decca Records was ready to sign Wilson, Green died, leaving the entire job of management to Tarnopol, who was only 25.

Decca placed Wilson on their Brunswick label, which had become their depository for black recording artists as well as Buddy Holly's Crickets, who Decca first thought were black until they actually met them in person. The breakout hit for Wilson was “Lonely Teardrops” in 1958, which was written by fledgling songwriters Berry Gordy Jr., Gwendolyn Gordy and Roquel "Billy" Davis. According to Jackie Wilson, “Lonely Teardrops” was originally written and recorded as a blues ballad. After playing it back in the recording in the studio, it was Tarnopol who instructed Decca's staff producer Dick Jacobs to reconfigure the song as an up-tempo recording. “Lonely Teardrops” became a number one record which skyrocketed Jackie Wilson's singing career and helped provide Berry Gordy the funds used to establish his Hitsville USA recording studio, the foundation for his Tamla and Motown record labels.

Jackie Wilson’s widow Harlean Wilson said the following in a 2019 interview published in The Chicago Defender: Jackie, she adds, owed much of his commercial success in the music business to his dedicated producer at Brunswick Records, Nat Tarnopol, who was also the head of the label and had originally brought Jackie to New York from their shared native city of Detroit. Unlike many other African-American entertainers of the day, Wilson was treated fairly by Brunswick and Tarnopol, says Harlean, but outside of the confines of the company, that was not always so: The singer and his wife were often subjected to painful, vicious rumors and untruths, legal entanglements and other indignities, including women who claimed to be linked with Jackie romantically and, later, both men and women claiming to be his children. One unconfirmed story had Jackie being held outside of an upper story of a building upside down by thugs until he agreed to sign a contract. (Another version of this story, told by Quincy Jones to Clarence Avant in the documentary The Black Godfather, appears to portray Tarnopol as the victim of mafia strongarming.)

== Brunswick Records ==
Decca's ultra conservative approach to music and promotion was a continuous hurdle that Tarnopol struggled with for years to come. In March 1959, Decca refused to manufacture sufficient numbers of the single “That's Why (I Love You So)” until Tarnopol personally guaranteed the additional costs to cover the required pressing of 250,000 records. Producer Dick Jacobs recalls that, on several occasions, Tarnopol was forced to record music which was published by and/or selected by Decca's A&R chief in order to get authorization for Wilson to gain access to the recording studio.

In 1960, Tarnopol persuaded Decca to guarantee an advance of a quarter of a million dollars to Wilson to re-sign with the company. This was six times the money that Elvis and Sun Records received from RCA just four years earlier. In order to keep both Tarnopol and Wilson on board, Decca also agreed to make Brunswick an independent label shared by Decca and a production company owned by Tarnopol. In 1962 Decca Records became part of MCA Inc.

In 1966, displeased with the direction Jackie Wilson's recording career had taken, Tarnopol contracted Chicago's Carl Davis to produce one album for Wilson. Positive of Davis's production ability, Tarnopol made Davis Vice President of A&R for Brunswick and built a recording studio on Chicago's Michigan Avenue. Tarnopol then expanded the label by signing mostly Chicago based artists. Over the next four years, Tarnopol had fourteen top ten Billboard hits with The Chi-Lites, Barbara Acklin, Tyrone Davis, Young-Holt Unlimited, Gene Chandler, Jackie Wilson and The Artistics.

By 1970, relations between Decca's executives and Tarnopol had continued to deteriorate and Tarnopol wanted out. To resolve the problem, a deal was struck for Tarnopol to purchase the remaining 50% of Brunswick from MCA. However, MCA insisted on maintaining their rights to manufacture and distribute all of Tarnopol's recordings. After conducting an audit of MCA in 1972, which uncovered roughly a million dollars in unpaid record sales, Tarnopol was finally able to break free from all manufacturing and distribution ties to MCA. Between the years of 1970 and 1975, Tarnopol totaled nineteen Top Ten Billboard records and had rebuilt the Brunswick trademark.

== Brunswick's decline ==
According to Ron Blomberg, by the mid 1970s Tarnopol was more interested in purchasing the New York Yankees than anything else. Baseball had always been Tarnopol's outlet from the turmoil of the music industry, and it was not uncommon for ball players like Thurman Munson or Reggie Jackson to be seen hanging out in Tarnopol's Manhattan office. Reggie Jackson credited Tarnopol with orchestrating the deal that brought Jackson to the Yankees from the Baltimore Orioles.

In 1975, Tarnopol, along with Clive Davis of Arista, Kenny Gamble of Philadelphia International and sixteen other independent record executives were charged on a variety of financial irregularities stemming from a government investigation of payola in the record industry. Tarnopol was ultimately cleared by an appellate court in 1977. The legal costs of the case drained the label's resources and seriously handicapped Tarnopol's ability to produce and promote records. Compounded by a growing conflict with the management of Brunswick's key recording artists, Tarnopol was forced to sell off Brunswick's publishing wing in order to keep the record label financially afloat. According to former Uni Records head Russ Regan, Tarnopol was emotionally devastated by this series of events and was never the same man afterwards.

One of the highlights of the federal payola trial of Tarnopol and the other Brunswick executives came when Eugene Record of the Chi-Lites testified that he had been assaulted during a contract negotiation at Brunswick's New York office. Record stated that when he asked for additional advance money on a recording in 1972 his booking agent and associate of Tommy Vastola, whom Record identified as Johnny Roberts, "suddenly began to twist my nose, and when I pushed his arm away he punched me in the face, knocking my glasses off." Vastola and record producer Carl Davis co-managed the Chi-Lites.

The last major hit for Tarnopol was the roller skating anthem "Bounce Rock Skate Roll" by Vaughan Mason & Crew, which reached the Number Five position on the Billboard R&B chart in the spring of 1980. However, by this time the landscape of the music industry was undergoing dramatic changes, while experiencing a slump in record sales. Without sufficient funding to ride it out, Tarnopol ceased producing records and closed his offices in 1982, just a few years shy of the CD sales boom.

== Death and legacy ==
After several years of financial hardship and poor health, Nat Tarnopol succumbed to congestive heart failure on December 25, 1987, at the age of 56.

Tarnopol's best known hit recordings were "Oh Girl" and "Have You Seen Her" by the Chi-Lites, the Young-Holt Unlimited's "Soulful Strut" and "Wack Wack", the Tyrone Davis tracks "Turn Back the Hands of Time" and "Can I Change My Mind" and Jackie Wilson's "Lonely Teardrops", "Baby Workout" and "(Your Love Keeps Lifting Me) Higher and Higher".

Many of the songs that Tarnopol first recorded have been sampled by artists such as Jay-Z, Paul Wall, Fantasia, Jaheim, Joss Stone and Beyoncé.

Brunswick Records is still owned by the Tarnopol family and Nat's son Paul is president of the company.

== Arbus photograph ==
Nat, his wife June and his son Paul, aged four were photographed in their backyard by Diane Arbus in 1968. The picture entitled 'A FAMILY ON THE LAWN ONE SUNDAY IN WESTCHESTER, N. Y.' was published in a story "Two American Families" that appeared in The Sunday Times Magazine (London), on November 10, 1968. The picture was included in her portfolio, a Box of Ten Photographs and additionally fetched one of the highest prices paid for her work at auction. According to the Sotheby's website, it was priced between as $200,000 - $300,000, but sold for $553,000. It has also appeared in Arbus exhibits and books sold worldwide including the successful Revelation exhibit at the Met Museum in New York.

== Bibliography ==
- Blomberg, Ron (2006). Designated Hebrew: The Ron Blomberg Story. Sports Publishing LLC. ISBN 978-1-58261-987-3.
- Pruter, Robert (1992). Chicago Soul. University of Illinois Press. ISBN 978-0-252-06259-9.
- Simmonds, Jeremy (2008). The Encyclopedia of Dead Rock Stars: Heroin, Handguns, and Ham Sandwiches. Chicago Review Press. ISBN 978-1-55652-754-8.
