= Give It Away (The Chi-Lites album) =

Studio album by The Chi-Lites
- Released: August 1969
- Genres: R&B, soul
- Length: 30:06
- Label: Brunswick
- Producers: Carl Davis, Eugene Record, Gerald Sims

The Chi-Lites chronology
Give It Away (1969)	I Like Your Lovin' (Do You Like Mine?) (1970)

Professional ratings
Review scores
Source	Rating
Allmusic	4/5 stars

Give It Away is the debut album by American soul group The Chi-Lites, produced by Carl Davis and lead singer Eugene Record. The album was released in 1969 on the Brunswick label.

== History ==
Give It Away consists of seven original tracks and four cover versions (three Motown songs and "The Twelfth of Never"). The album was well received by critics and sold respectably, with four singles reaching the R&B top 50 and two the Billboard Hot 100. The album sold mainly to the R&B market, where it peaked at #16. Five singles were released from the album with the title track charting the highest, #88 on the Billboard Hot 100 and #10 on R&B chart, their first top ten hit.

In 2004, the track "What Do I Wish For" became familiar to television viewers in the United Kingdom when it was used in a commercial for fast food chain KFC.

== Track listing ==
Side one
No.	Title	Writer(s)	Length
1.	"Give It Away"	Eugene Record, Carl Davis	2:43
2.	"Let Me Be the Man My Daddy Was"	Eugene Record, Barbara Acklin	3:28
3.	"My Whole World Ended"	Johnny Bristol, Harvey Fuqua, Pamela Joan Sawyer, Jimmy Roach	3:04
4.	"I Heard It Through the Grapevine"	Norman Whitfield, Barrett Strong	3:05
5.	"What Do I Wish For"	Eugene Record, Carl Davis	2:55
6.	"That's My Baby for You"	Eugene Record, Carl Davis	2:05

Side two
No.	Title	Writer(s)	Length
7.	"I'm Gonna Make You Love Me"	Kenneth Gamble, Jerry Ross, Jerry Williams	2:28
8.	"You're No Longer Part of My Heart"	Eugene Record	2:58
9.	"24 Hours of Sadness"	Eugene Record, Carl Davis	2:06
10.	"To Change My Love"	Eugene Record	2:28
11.	"The Twelfth of Never"	Jerry Livingston, Paul Francis Webster	2:41

== Personnel ==
- Eugene Record, Marshall Thompson, Robert "Squirrel" Lester, Creadel "Red" Jones – vocals

== Production ==
- Carl Davis, Eugene Record, Gerald Sims – producers
- Willie Henderson – director
- Sonny Sanders – arranger

== Charts ==
Chart (1969)	Peak
U.S. Billboard Top LPs	180
U.S. Billboard Top Soul LPs	16

Singles

Year	Single	Peak chart positions	
Year	Single	US	US R&B
1969	"Give It Away"	88	10
1969	"Let Me Be the Man My Daddy Was"	94	15
1969	"The Twelfth of Never"	122	47
1969	"To Change My Love"	—	—
1970	"24 Hours of Sadness"	119	30
