= I Love You (Otis Leavill song) =

Single by Otis Leavill
- B-side: "I Need You"
- Released: 1969
- Genre: Soul
- Length: 2:58
- Label: Dakar Records 45-614
- Songwriters: Carl Davis, Eugene Record, Barbara Acklin
- Producer: Willie Henderson

Otis Leavill singles chronology
"It's the Same Old Me" (1968)	"I Love You" (1969)	"Glad I met You" (1970)

"I Love You" is a song and single written by Carl Davis, Eugene Record and Barbara Acklin and performed by American soul singer, Otis Leavill. Record and Acklin also provided backing vocals. At the time of the recording, Leavill was vice-president of Dakar Records, the label upon which the song was released.

== Chart performance ==
It was first released in 1969 in America and reached 10 on the R&B chart and 63 on the Billboard Hot 100 in January 1970. Allmusic.com described Leavill's rendition as "imitating Record, the Chi-lites' lead singer". It was released on Atlantic in the UK in 1970 but failed to chart.
