= Help Wanted (The Chi-Lites album) =

Studio album by The Chi-Lites
- Released: February 10, 1998
- Genre: R&B/Soul
- Length: 53:29
- Label: Copper Sun
- Producer: Carl Davis, Keith Henderson, Marshall Thompson

The Chi-Lites chronology
Greatest Hits, Vol. 2 (1996)	Help Wanted (1998)	Too Good to Be Forgotten (1998)

Professional ratings
Review scores
Source	Rating
Allmusic	2/5 stars

Help Wanted is a 1998 album by the Chi-Lites.

== History ==
There are twelve tracks on the album and the lead singing alternates between Anthony Watson and Frank Reed. However, group leader, Marshall Thompson sings lead on the opening track, "Hold On To Your Dreams". Connee Thompson was the Executive Producer. The arrangements were by Bruce Thompson and Keith Henderson.

== Track listing ==
No.	Title	Writer(s)	Length
1.	"Hold on to Your Dreams"	Vernon Bullock, Ivy Jo Hunter	5:11
2.	"All My Love"	Keith Henderson	4:21
3.	"Help Wanted (Heroes Are in Short Supply)"	Dianne Womack, K. Muhammad, Barbara Acklin, Bruce Thompson	3:55
4.	"Love Uprising"	Eugene Record	3:33
5.	"The Sly, Slick, and the Wicked"	Lowrell Simon, Larry Brownlee, Gus Redmond	4:00
6.	"Love of My Life"	Anthony Wilson	4:22
7.	"Nothing Lasts Forever"	Wilson	4:44
8.	"I Will Never Be Lonely Again"	K. Muhammad, Dianne Womack, Bruce Thompson, Rick Evans	5:12
9.	"Just You and I Tonight"	R. Thomas, Richard Pope	4:12
10.	"There's a Change"	Thomas, Richard Pope	4:58
11.	"Just Say You Love Me"	Anthony Watson, Wayne Stalling	4:05
12.	"Help Wanted (Heroes Are in Short Supply)" (Extended Mix)	Womack, Muhammad, Acklin, Thompson	4:56
