= Otis Leavill =

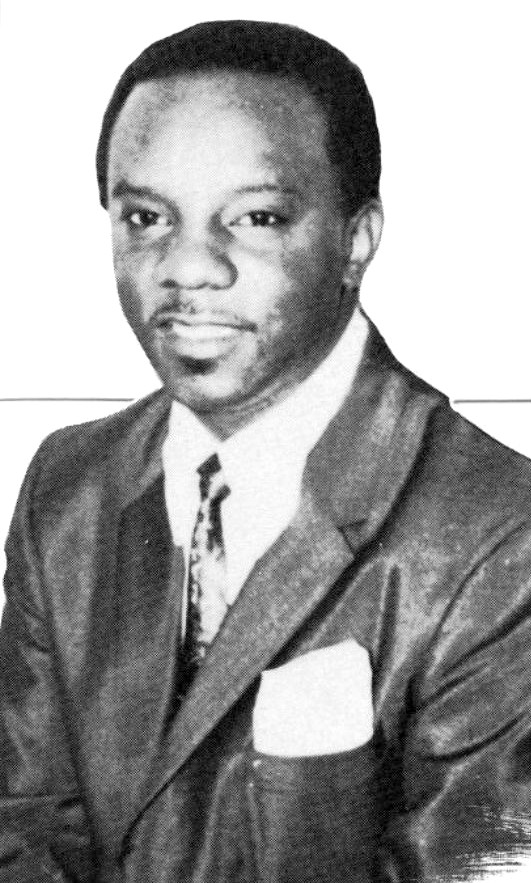
- Otis Leavill in 1970.

Background information
- Born: Otis Leavill Cobb; February 8, 1937; Dewey Rose, Elbert County, Georgia
- Died: July 17, 2002 (aged 65) Chicago, Illinois
- Genre: Soul
- Occupations: Singer, record producer
- Instrument: Vocals
- Years active: 1958–2002
- Labels: Okeh, Atlantic
- Formerly of: The Chi-Lites, Tyrone Davis, Hamilton Bohannon, Chaka Khan.

Otis Leavill (February 8, 1937 – July 17, 2002) was an American R&B singer, songwriter and record company executive.

== Life and career ==
Otis Leavill Cobb was born in Dewey Rose, Elbert County, Georgia, and moved with his family to the West Side of Chicago at the age of two. His father was pastor of the First Church of Deliverance on South Wabash Avenue, and he started singing in the family's gospel group, the Cobb Quartet. In his teens, he took part in amateur boxing with his friend Major Lance, graduated from Crane High School, and attended college. With Lance and Barbara Tyson, he formed a short-lived vocal group, The Floats, who recorded an unreleased demo record in 1958/59.

He released his first record, "Rise Sally Rise" coupled with "I Gotta Right To Cry"—written by another friend, Curtis Mayfield—on the small Lucky label in 1963, and then issued two singles on the Limelight label. His fourth record, "Let Her Love Me", written by Billy Butler, produced by Major Lance, and with The Impressions on backing vocals, was issued by Blue Rock Records in late 1964, and rose to # 31 on the Billboard R&B chart, its success leading to Leavill touring with Dick Clark's Caravan of Stars. However, follow-up records on Blue Rock were unsuccessful, and he moved on to record in the 1960s for several other labels.

As a talent scout and assistant producer, he worked with Carl Davis at both Okeh and Brunswick, where he was credited with discovering The Chi-Lites, Tyrone Davis, Hamilton Bohannon, and Yvette Stevens who became better known as Chaka Khan. In 1967 Davis formed Dakar Records, and Leavill joined him as Vice-President. Leavill also recorded with Dakar, and in 1969 "I Love You", written by Eugene Record of The Chi-Lites and with backing vocals by Record and Barbara Acklin, became his biggest chart hit, reaching # 10 on the R&B chart. The follow-up, "Love Uprising", also written by Record (and credited to "Otis Leaville"), again made the R&B charts.

His later records were unsuccessful, but Leavill continued to work with, and write songs for, such artists as Major Lance, Tyrone Davis, and Gene Chandler on labels including Brunswick and Chi-Sound. He also coached football at Hyde Park High for several years, and worked as a policeman. In 1999 he toured Europe with The Dells, and in 2000 he formed the OK Records label. He died in Chicago of a heart attack in 2002, aged 65. He was survived by his wife, Minnie and a son, Derick.

== Selected discography ==
Singles

- "I'm Amazed" C. Davis, M. Lance, C. Jones 1964
- "Let Her Love Me" 1965
- "To Be Or Not To Be" 1965
- "A Reason To Be Lonely" 1965
- "I Love You" 1969
