= Toby (album) =

Studio album by The Chi-Lites
- Released: June 1974
- Genres: R&B, soul
- Length: 44:32
- Label: Brunswick
- Producer: Eugene Record

The Chi-Lites chronology
Chi-Lites (1973)	Toby (1974)	Half a Love (1975)

Singles from Toby
- 1. "There Will Never Be Any Peace (Until God Is Seated at the Conference Table)" Released: 1974; 2. "You Got to Be the One" Released: 1974; 3. "Toby" Released: 1974; 4. "That's How Long" Released: 1974

Professional ratings
Review scores
Source	Rating
Allmusic	3/5 stars

Toby is the seventh studio album by American soul group The Chi-Lites, produced by lead singer Eugene Record. The album was released in 1974 on the Brunswick label.

== History ==
By 1974, Brunswick had started to struggle financially so Toby was less heavily-promoted than the group's previous albums and fared less well commercially. It was the first Chi-Lites album since 1970 to stall outside the R&B top 10 (peaking at #12) and to miss the top 100 on the Pop listings. Three singles from the album were top 20 R&B hits. In the UK however, where the Chi-Lites had previously established themselves as a successful singles group, none of the issued singles made any impact on the national chart.

== Track listing ==
Side one
No.	Title	Writer(s)	Length
1.	"Toby"	Eugene Record, Barbara Acklin	3:44
2.	"You Got to Be the One"	Eugene Record, Marshall Arrington	3:54
3.	"The Sound of Lonely"	Eugene Record, Stan McKenney	5:01
4.	"The First Time (Ever I Saw Your Face)"	Chesley McCaull	5:26
5.	"There Will Never Be Any Peace (Until God Is Seated at the Conference Table)"	Eugene Record	5:12

Side two
No.	Title	Writer(s)	Length
6.	"That's How Long"	Archie Powell, Tony Boyd	5:03
7.	"Happiness Is Your Middle Name"	Eugene Record	3:33
8.	"I Lied"	Eugene Record	5:40
9.	"I Like to Live the Love (That I Sing About)"	Dave Crawford, Charles Mann	4:00
10.	"Gettin' on Outta Town"	Eugene Record, Sandra Drayton	2:50

== Charts ==
Chart (1974)	Peak
U.S. Billboard Top LPs	181
U.S. Billboard Top Soul LPs	12

Singles

Year	Single	Peak chart positions	
Year	Single	US	US R&B
1974	"There Will Never Be Any Peace (Until God Is Seated at the Conference Table)"	63	8
1974	"You Got to Be the One"	83	15
1974	"Toby"	78	7
1974	"That's How Long"	78	7
