= The Artistics =

American musical group

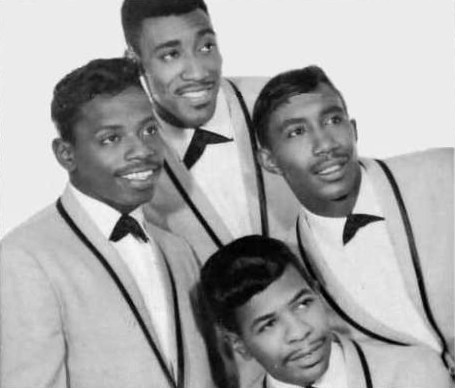
- The group in 1965.

Background information
- Origin: Chicago, Illinois, U.S.
- Genres: R&B; soul
- Years active: 1958–1973, 1999
- Labels: OKeh; Brunswick; Motorcity
- Past members: Curt Thomas; Larry Johnson; Jesse Bolian; Aaron Floyd; Robert Dobyne; Charles Davis; Marvin Smith; Tommy Green; Fred Pettis

The Artistics were an American R&B vocal group in the 1960s and early 1970s. Their biggest hit was "I'm Gonna Miss You", recorded in 1966.

== Career ==
The group was formed in 1958 at Marshall High School in Chicago, Illinois, with a line-up of Curt Thomas (lead), Larry Johnson (first tenor), Jesse Bolian (second tenor; June 8, 1941 – August 24, 1994) and Aaron Floyd (baritone bass). In 1960, Thomas left and was replaced by lead singer Robert Dobyne. The group performed at the 1960 Democratic National Convention, and began singing backup for Major Lance, including on his record "Monkey Time". Record producer Carl Davis signed the group to OKeh Records in 1963, but their early records were not successful. Dobyne left in 1964, later writing for the Temptations and recording for Motown though his recordings were not released at the time. Lead singer duties for the Artistics were taken over first by Charles Davis, previously of The Dukays, and then by Marvin Smith (born October 8, 1940, Palestine, Arkansas), previously of The El Dorados.

They had their first local hit with "Get My Hands On Some Lovin'", co-written and first recorded by Marvin Gaye, and followed it up with the more successful "This Heart of Mine", written by Barrett Strong. The single reached no. 25 on the Billboard R&B chart following its release in late 1965. The group released an LP, Get My Hands on Some Lovin' (1966), with several tracks written by Strong, but their next two singles for OKeh were unsuccessful, and they moved to Brunswick Records where Carl Davis had become A&R Director. Their first record on the label was "I'm Gonna Miss You", written by Smith, Bolian and Johnson of the group and produced by Davis, which rose to no. 9 on the R&B chart and no. 55 on the pop chart at the end of 1966. Marvin Smith left the group for a solo career before the record made the charts, and was replaced by Tommy Green. Smith continued to collaborate on writing material, and sang on some of the group's records until 1970. The group's next single, "Girl I Need You", with Green on lead vocal, was also a minor hit, and the group recorded an LP, I'm Gonna Miss You. Several further singles on Brunswick were less successful, but they recorded two further albums, The Articulate Artistics (1968) and What Happened (1969), produced by Carl Davis with Eugene Record who also wrote some of their material. The albums are now regarded as high points of Chicago R&B recordings of the period and their tracks are highly regarded by fans of Northern soul. The group's last chart record was "Make My Life Over" in 1971, with Fred Pettis replacing Green on lead vocal. The group left Brunswick in 1973, and disbanded soon afterwards.

The albums I'm Gonna Miss You and The Articulate Artistics were reissued on CD in 1998, and a compilation CD of their recordings was issued the following year. Smith briefly reformed the group in 1999, to undertake some recordings for Ian Levine's Motorcity Records.

Larry Johnson (b. Lawrence Johnson, Chicago, Illinois) died in June 2015.

== Discography ==
=== Chart singles ===
Year	Single	Chart Positions	
Year	Single	US Pop	US R&B
1965	"This Heart of Mine"	115	25
1966	"I'm Gonna Miss You"	55	9
1967	"Girl I Need You"	69	26
1970	"Just Another Heartache"	-	48
1971	"(I Want You To) Make My Life Over"	-	48

=== Albums ===
- Get My Hands On Some Lovin' (OKeh, 1966)
- I'm Gonna Miss You (Brunswick, 1967)
- The Articulate Artistics (Brunswick, 1968)
- What Happened (Brunswick, 1969)
- I Want You to Make My Life Over (Brunswick, 1970)
- Look Out (Brunswick, 1973)
- I'm Gonna Miss You & The Articulate Artistics (Edsel CD, 1998)
- The Best of the Artistics (Brunswick, CD, 1999)
