= It's Time for Love (disambiguation) =

It's Time for Love is the sixth album by Teddy Pendergrass.

It's Time for Love may also refer to:

- "It's Time for Love", a 1975 song by The Chi-Lites from Half a Love
- "Don't Say Goodnight (It's Time for Love)", a 1980 soul song
- "It's Time for Love" (Don Williams song), a 1985 country song

== See also ==
- A Time for Love (disambiguation)
- A Time for Love (disambiguation)
