= A Lonely Man =

Studio album by The Chi-Lites
- Released: April 1972
- Genres: R&B, soul
- Length: 42:44
- Label: Brunswick
- Producer: Eugene Record

The Chi-Lites chronology
(For God's Sake) Give More Power to the People (1971)	A Lonely Man (1972)	Greatest Hits (1972)

Professional ratings
Review scores
Source	Rating
AllMusic	4.5/5 stars
Christgau's Record Guide	B

A Lonely Man is the fourth studio album by American soul group The Chi-Lites, produced and largely written by lead singer Eugene Record. The album was released in 1972 on the Brunswick label.

== History ==
A Lonely Man includes The Chi-Lites most successful single "Oh Girl", which topped both the pop and R&B charts and peaked at No. 14 on the UK Singles Chart, the eight and a half-minute epic "The Coldest Days of My Life" and a cover of Marvin Gaye's "Inner City Blues (Make Me Wanna Holler)". A Lonely Man was The Chi-Lites' most successful album, topping the R&B chart and peaking at No. 5 on the pop chart. It is frequently cited as the group's best recording. AllMusic reviewer Craig Lytle describes the album as "flawless" and "exquisite".

== Track listing ==
All songs written by Eugene Record, except where noted.

Side one
No.	Title	Writer(s)	Length
1.	"Oh Girl"		3:48
2.	"Living in the Footsteps of Another Man"	Samuel Garner, James Smith	2:57
3.	"Love Is"		4:41
4.	"Being in Love"	Record, Barbara Acklin	3:56
5.	"A Lonely Man"	Record, J. Edward Haycraft	6:23

Side two
No.	Title	Writer(s)	Length
6.	"The Man & the Woman (The Boy & the Girl)"		4:02
7.	"Ain't Too Much of Nothin'"		3:31
8.	"Inner City Blues (Make Me Wanna Holler)"	Marvin Gaye, James Nyx Jr.	5:06
9.	"The Coldest Days of My Life"	Record, Carl Davis	8:30

== Personnel ==
- Marshall Thompson – vocals
- Robert "Squirrel" Lester – vocals
- Creadel "Red" Jones – vocals
- Eugene Record – producer, arranger, vocals
- Thomas (Tom Tom) Washington – arranger, conductor
- Cliff Davis – arranger
- Bruce Swedien – engineer
- Craig Barksdale – technician

== Charts ==
=== Weekly charts ===
Chart (1972)	Peak position
U.S. Billboard Top LPs	5
U.S. Billboard Top Soul LPs	1

=== Singles ===
Year	Single	Peak chart positions	
Year	Single	US	US R&B
1972	"Oh Girl"	1	1
1972	"The Coldest Days of My Life (Part 1)"	47	8
1972	"A Lonely Man"	57	25
1972	"The Man & the Woman (The Boy & the Girl)"	57	—

== See also ==
- List of number-one R&B albums of 1972 (U.S.)
