= Walter Jackson (singer) =

American soul ballad singer (1938–1983)

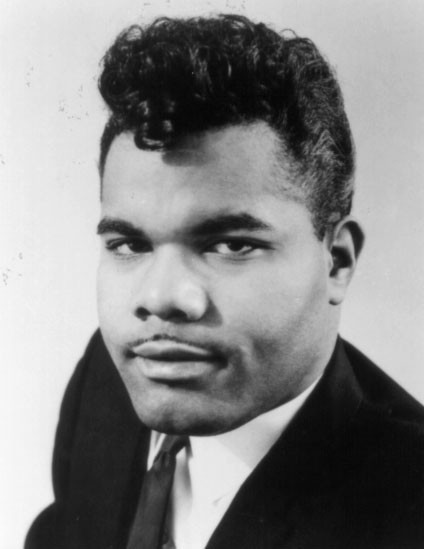

Background information
- Born: Walter Jackson; March 19, 1938; Pensacola, Florida, United States
- Died: June 20, 1983 (aged 45) Chicago, Illinois, United States
- Genres: Soul, R&B, Chicago soul
- Occupation: singer
- Years active: 1959–1983
- Labels: Columbia, OKeh, Cotillion, Brunswick, Chi Sound, Kelli-Arts

Walter Jackson (March 19, 1938 – June 20, 1983) was an American soul ballad singer who had a string of hits on the US R&B chart between the mid-1960s and early 1980s. His biggest successes included "It's All Over" in 1964, "It's An Uphill Climb to the Bottom" in 1966 and "Feelings", a cover of the Morris Albert pop hit, in 1976.

== Life and career ==
He was born in Pensacola, Florida, United States, and raised in Detroit. As a child he became ill with polio and, as a result, he used crutches for the rest of his life. He first recorded as a member of a vocal group, the Velvetones, on the Deb label in 1959 before turning solo, singing in Detroit nightclubs. After failing an audition for Motown, he was discovered performing in a club by Columbia Records' A&R man, Carl Davis, who was impressed with his powerful voice and persuaded him to move to Chicago in 1962 and sign for the label.

His first solo record, "I Don't Want To Suffer" was not a hit and, after a few more releases, he transferred to the subsidiary label, OKeh, which Davis was running. There, Jackson had his first hit with "It's All Over", written by Curtis Mayfield and produced by Mayfield and Davis, which made no. 67 on the Billboard Hot 100 in 1964.

Davis continued to provide songs for Jackson from such writers as Mayfield and Van McCoy and he had a string of hits on the R&B chart in the mid-1960s, although none rose above the lower reaches of the pop chart. Among the most successful were "Suddenly I'm All Alone" (no. 13 R&B, no. 96 pop, 1965), "Welcome Home" (no. 15 R&B, no. 95 pop, 1965), "It's An Uphill Climb to the Bottom" (no. 11 R&B, no. 88 pop, 1966), and "Speak Her Name" (no. 22 R&B, no. 89 pop, 1967). Davis also promoted Jackson as an album artist and three LPs by him were released on OKeh – It's All Over, Welcome Home (1965), and Speak Her Name (1966). The latter was produced by Columbia staff producer, Ted Cooper, following Davis' departure from the company. A greatest hits collection was also issued.

He moved to Atlantic subsidiary Cotillion Records in the late 1960s and then on to the Brunswick label, with diminishing commercial success, with either Cooper or Davis producing. There were also short stays at Wand Records and small Chicago label, USA Records before, in the mid-1970s, he moved to Davis' new Chi Sound label and had one of his biggest hits with a version of Morris Albert's 1975 pop hit "Feelings". Jackson's version reached no. 9 on the R&B chart and no. 93 on the pop chart in 1976. The following year, his version of Peter Frampton's "Baby, I Love Your Way" reached no. 19 on the R&B chart, but later releases were less successful.

Jackson died of a cerebral hemorrhage in 1983 at the age of 45.
