= Homely Girl =

1973 single by the Chi-Lites

Single by the Chi-Lites

from the album Chi-Lites
- Released: 1973
- Genre: Soul
- Length: 3:35
- Label: Brunswick
- Songwriter(s): Eugene Record; Stan McKenny
- Producer(s): Eugene Record

The Chi-Lites singles chronology
"I Found Sunshine" (1973)	"Homely Girl" (1973)	"There Will Never Be Peace" (1974)

"Homely Girl" is a song by American vocal group the Chi-Lites. Released in 1973, it reached number five on the UK Singles Chart, number three on the US Hot Soul Singles chart, and number 54 on the US Billboard Hot 100. A cover by UB40 also became a hit between 1989 and 1991 in several countries.

== Charts ==
Chart (1973)	Peak position
Canada (RPM)	98
UK Singles (OCC)	5
US Billboard Hot 100	54
US Best Selling Soul Singles (Billboard)	3

== UB40 version ==
"Homely Girl"

Single by UB40

from the album Labour of Love II
- B-side: "Gator" (instrumental)
- Released: November 6, 1989
- Length: 3:22
- Label: Virgin
- Songwriter(s): Eugene Record; Stan McKenny
- Producer(s): UB40

UB40 singles chronology
"I Would Do for You" (1989)	"Homely Girl" (1989)	"Kingston Town" (1989)

A cover version by UB40, from their ninth studio album, Labour of Love II (1989), was released as a single on November 6, 1989, in the United Kingdom. This cover reached the top 10 in the UK, France, the Netherlands, and New Zealand. In France, the song was used in a television advertisement for the Lee Cooper jeans. David Giles of Music Week deemed "Homely Girl" as "UB40's best for a while", adding: "It's a mark of a truly great band to be able to perform a cover version so convincingly that you end up thinking they've written it themselves".

=== Track listings ===
7-inch single

1. "Homely Girl" – 3:22
2. "Gator" (instrumental) – 4:01

12-inch single

1. "Homely Girl" (extended mix) – 7:29
2. "Gator" (instrumental) – 4:01
3. "Homely Girl" – 3:22

CD single

1. "Homely Girl" – 3:22
2. "Gator" (instrumental) – 4:01
3. "Homely Girl" (extended mix) – 7:29

=== Charts ===
==== Weekly charts ====
Chart (1989–1991)	Peak position
Australia (ARIA)	52
Belgium (Ultratop 50 Flanders)	11
Europe (Eurochart Hot 100)	19
Finland (Suomen virallinen lista)	30
France (SNEP)	4
Ireland (IRMA)	10
Netherlands (Dutch Top 40)	2
Netherlands (Single Top 100)	2
New Zealand (Recorded Music NZ)	4
UK Singles (OCC)	6

==== Year-end charts ====
Chart (1989)	Position
Netherlands (Dutch Top 40)	90
Netherlands (Single Top 100)	73
UK Singles (OCC)	94

Chart (1990)	Position
Belgium (Ultratop 50 Flanders)	99
Netherlands (Dutch Top 40)	58

=== Certifications ===
Region	Certification	Certified units/sales
France (SNEP)	Silver	125,000^{*}
New Zealand (RMNZ)	2× Platinum	60,000^{‡}
United Kingdom (BPI)	Silver	200,000^{‡}
^{*} Sales figures based on certification alone.^{‡} Sales+streaming figures based on certification alone.

== Other versions ==
In 1974, Jackie Robinson, lead singer of the Pioneers, released a cover version in the UK on Trojan Records' subsidiary label Harry J. It was this reggae version that inspired UB40, whose "Labour of Love" albums are cover versions of reggae tracks of the 1960s and 1970s.
