= Half a Love =

Studio album by The Chi-Lites
- Released: July 1975
- Genre: R&B, soul
- Length: 38:21
- Label: Brunswick
- Producer: Eugene Record

The Chi-Lites chronology
Toby (1974)	Half a Love (1975)	Happy Being Lonely (1976)

Professional ratings
Review scores
Source	Rating
Allmusic	4/5 stars

Half a Love is the eighth album by American soul group The Chi-Lites, produced and largely written by lead singer Eugene Record. The album was released in 1975 on the Brunswick label.

== History ==
Half a Love was the group's final album for Brunswick, which was in serious financial trouble by 1975. Half a Love contains only six new tracks, supplemented by four tracks from earlier Chi-Lites albums. Brunswick's problems meant that the album received minimal promotion in the US, where it could only reach #41 on the R&B chart. The only single release "It's Time for Love" likewise stalled in the lower reaches of both the pop and R&B charts, but did become a top 5 hit in the UK.

After the release of Half a Love, The Chi-Lites released three further non-album singles for Brunswick before leaving the company in 1976. Their final Brunswick release "You Don't Have to Go" passed by largely unnoticed in the US, but was a major 1976 summer hit in the UK where it became jointly the group's highest-charting single, matching the #3 position reached by "Have You Seen Her" over four years earlier. The 1999 Edsel Records reissue of Half a Love includes the final three singles as bonus tracks; they can also be found on the same company's 2004 UK-issue compilation The Complete The Chi-Lites on Brunswick Records: Volume 2.

== Track listing ==
Side one
No.	Title	Writer(s)	Length
1.	"Half-a-Love"	Teddy Randazzo, Victoria Pike, Iran Koster	2:48
2.	"Here I Am"	Eugene Record, Chris Allen	3:45
3.	"I Never Had It So Good (And Felt So Bad)"	Eugene Record, Stan McKenney	5:06
4.	"Living in the Footsteps of Another Man"	Samuel Garner, James Smith	3:01
5.	"When Temptation Comes"	Eugene Record	4:20

Side two
No.	Title	Writer(s)	Length
6.	"It's Time for Love"	Eugene Record	5:05
7.	"Take a Trip to the Islands"	Eugene Record	3:20
8.	"Go Away Dream"	Eugene Record, Stan McKinney	3:23
9.	"I'm Not a Gambler"	Eugene Record	3:55
10.	"Ain't Too Much of Nothin'"	Eugene Record	3:05

- Tracks 3 & 8 originally released on Chi-Lites (1973)
- Tracks 4 & 10 originally released on A Lonely Man (1972)

== Charts ==
Chart (1975)	Peak
U.S. Billboard Top Soul LPs	41

Singles

Year	Single	Peak chart positions	
Year	Single	US	US R&B
1975	"It's Time for Love"	94	27
1975	"Here I Am"	—	87
