= Warren Tipton =

American singer (1958–2026)

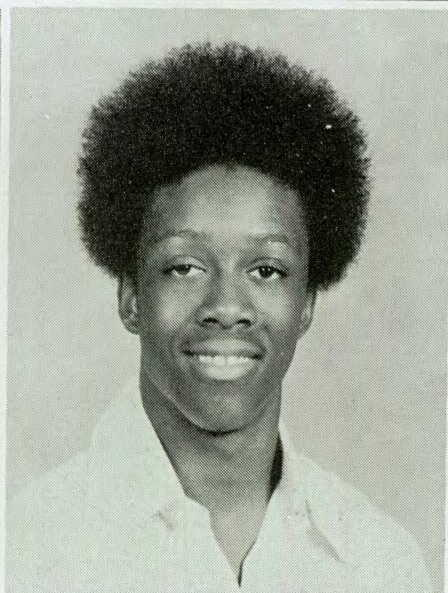
Tipton's 1976 yearbook photo at Lew Wallace High School

Warren F. Tipton (June 12, 1958 – May 9, 2026) was an American R&B and soul singer from Gary, Indiana. He was notably a member of The Chi-Lites, joining in 2018 to serve as the lead & background vocalist on concerts for the group, before leaving in 2023. He is also known for being the father of rapper Freddie Gibbs.

== Early life ==
Tipton was born on June 12, 1958, to Governor and Mary Tipton. The couple initially resided in Mississippi, but moved to Indiana due to racism after Governor returned home from fighting in World War II. He had seven siblings. As a child, he attended Lew Wallace High School, where he successfully graduated in 1976.

He picked up singing as a child after his mother told him to "find something [he's] good at, [and] don't give up!" This would develop into a deep love for singing, and he would nurture a nearly 50-year-long career in music.

== Career ==
Tipton began singing professionally in 1977 at age 18. In 2005, he would accompany the highly influential Philadelphian R&B and soul group The Intruders, performing with them until leaving in 2018. The same year, he joined The Chi-Lites, where he shared the stage with Marshall Thompson. He would accompany the group up until his leave in 2023.

From 2012 to 2022, he would serve as a lead singer in the 12-piece Together Band.

Tipton's son, Freddie Gibbs, has shared stories about Tipton competing against a then-young Michael Jackson in the local music scene of Gary, where both are from. Gibbs described Tipton as a vocalist serious enough to hold his own, even when faced against one of the most influential and highly regarded musicians in history.

He also had a 30-year-long career in the police force. After obtaining a Law Enforcement concepts certification at the Indiana Law Enforcement Academy, he joined the Gary Police Department in December 1980. After leaving in January 2000, he would work at a few different police stations in the Chicago area before retiring as a police officer at the Cook County Sheriff's Department in 2011.

== Death ==
On May 9, 2026, Tipton died at the age of 67.

His death was first publicly revealed by the co-founding Chi-Lites member Marshall Thompson in a Facebook post. Tipton's son, Freddie Gibbs, also announced his death the following day in an Instagram post. Many musicians paid respects to Tipton, including Clairo, Big Boi and Redveil.
