= Chi-Lites (album) =

Studio album by The Chi-Lites
- Released: August 1973
- Genres: R&B, soul
- Length: 38:03
- Label: Brunswick
- Producer: Eugene Record

The Chi-Lites chronology
A Letter to Myself (1973)	Chi-Lites (1973)	Toby (1974)

Singles from Chi-Lites
- 1. "Stoned Out of My Mind" Released: 1973; 2. "I Found Sunshine" Released: 1973; 3. "Homely Girl" Released: 1974

Professional ratings
Review scores
Source	Rating
Allmusic	3/5 stars

Chi-Lites is the self-titled sixth studio album by American soul group The Chi-Lites, produced and largely written by, lead singer Eugene Record. The album was released in 1973 on the Brunswick label.

== History ==
Chi-Lites includes three of the group's most successful singles. "Stoned Out of My Mind" and "Homely Girl" both made the top 3 on the US R&B chart, while "Homely Girl" and "Too Good to Be Forgotten" both making the top 10 hit list in the UK. The latter, while never released as a single in the US, has remained one of the group's biggest hits in the UK. In 1986, there was a cover version by the band Amazulu, which also made the top 10. Chi-Lites peaked at #3 on the R&B chart and #89 on the Pop chart.

== Track listing ==
Side one
No.	Title	Writer(s)	Length
1.	"Homely Girl"	Eugene Record, Stan McKenney	4:10
2.	"Go Away Dream"	Eugene Record, Stan McKenney	3:40
3.	"Too Good to Be Forgotten"	Eugene Record, Barbara Acklin	3:20
4.	"I Found Sunshine"	Eugene Record	2:50
5.	"I Never Had It So Good (And Felt So Bad)"	Eugene Record, Stan McKenney	5:00

Side two
No.	Title	Writer(s)	Length
6.	"Marriage License"	Eugene Record, Alonzo Tucker	5:30
7.	"I Forgot to Say I Love You Till I'm Gone"	Eugene Record, Stan McKenney	3:20
8.	"One Man Band"	Thom Bell, Linda Creed	5:00
9.	"Bet You'll Never Be Sorry"	Gerald Sims	3:30
10.	"Stoned Out of My Mind"	Eugene Record, Barbara Acklin	3:00

== Charts ==
Chart (1973)	Peak
U.S. Billboard Top LPs	89
U.S. Billboard Top Soul LPs	3

Singles

Year	Single	Peak chart positions	
Year	Single	US	US R&B
1973	"Stoned Out of My Mind"	30	2
1973	"I Found Sunshine"	47	17
1974	"Homely Girl"	54	3
