= Manchild (band) =

American funk band (1974–1980)

- Origin: Indianapolis, Indiana, U.S.
- Genres: Soul, funk
- Years active: 1974–1980
- Labels: Chi Sound Records
- Past members: Kenneth Edmonds; Daryl Simmons; Reggie Griffin; Anthony "A.J." Johnson; Chuckie Bush; Kevin "Flash" Ferrell; Robert Parson; Harold Gooch

Manchild was an American 1970s funk band from Indianapolis, Indiana.

They are best known for having a teenaged Kenny Babyface Edmonds in the group before he moved over to Dick Griffey's SOLAR Records to be in the band the Deele along with Antonio "L.A." Reid. The group was formed by Reggie Griffin and Anthony "A.J." Johnson in June 1974. They released two albums and had a minor hit with "Especially for You". The band also included percussionist/vocalist Daryl Simmons, who later became associated with numerous Babyface-related projects (and has several Top Ten hits a producer/songwriter on acts like Dru Hill, Monica and Xscape, to name a few).

Founder member multi-instrumentalist Reggie Griffin, became a prominent musician/arranger, contributing heavily to the massive hit title track of Chaka Khan's 1984 I Feel for You album, and later working extensively with Sugar Hill Records with such acts a Grandmaster Flash and The Furious Five, Melle Melle and sessions with Phyliss Hyman, The O'Jays, Dionne Warwick, Aretha Franklin, Patti LaBelle, Bette Midler and Toni Braxton, to name a few. He has toured with The Isley Brothers and with Babyface during his solo career. Griffin had a solo charting single called "Mirda Rock" in 1982.

Singer and keyboard player Charles "Chuckie" Bush, co-writer of "Especially for You", died on February 6, 2017, aged 58. Bass guitarist Anthony "A.J." Johnson and co-writer of the songs "Red Hot Daddy" and "You Get What You Give" from their first album POWER AND LOVE, died on December 24, 2021, age 68.

== Discography ==
=== Studio albums ===
- Power and Love (Chi Sound Records, 1977)
- Feel the Phuff (Chi Sound Records, 1978)
