= Power and Love =

Studio album by Manchild
- Released: 1977
- Recorded: 1977 P.S. Studios, Chicago, Illinois
- Genre: Soul, funk
- Label: Chi Sound Records
- Producer: Sonny Sanders

Manchild chronology
Power and Love (1977)	Feel the Phuff (1978)

Professional ratings
Review scores
Source	Rating
AllMusic	3/5 stars

Power and Love is the debut album by Manchild.

== Chart performance ==
Released in 1977, Power and Love peaked at #29 on the Billboard R&B albums chart.

== Track listing ==
1. Red Hot Daddy – (Anthony Johnson, Kevin Ferrell, Reggie Griffin) 3:25
2. (I Want to Feel Your) Power and Love – (Charles Bush, Sid Johnson) 3:46
3. Especially for You – (Charles Bush) 6:06
4. Takin' It to the Streets – (Michael McDonald) 4:04
5. You Get What You Give – (Anthony Johnson, Kevin Ferrell) 2:31
6. We Need We – (Reggie Griffin) 4:06
7. These Are the Things That Are Special to Me – (Kenneth Edmonds, Daryl Simmons) 3:37
8. Funky Situation – (Kenneth Edmonds) 5:46

== Personnel ==
- Kenny Edmonds – Acoustic Guitar, Rhythm Guitar, Handclaps, Lead and Backing Vocals
- Daryl Simmons – Congas, Bongos, Percussion, Handclaps, Backing Vocals
- Reggie Griffin – Tenor & Soprano Saxophone, Lead & Rhythm Guitar, Clavinet, Acoustic Piano, Handclaps, Backing Vocals
- Charles "Chuckie" Bush – Fender Rhodes Electric Piano, Piano, Synthesizer, Strings (Ensemble), Handclaps, Lead and Backing Vocals
- Kevin Ferrell – Lead and Backing Vocals, Handclaps
- Robert Parson – Drums, Handclaps
- Anthony Johnson – Bass (Guitar, Mu-tron), Handclaps
- Harold Gooch – Rhythm Guitar, Backing Vocals
- Dwayne Johnson, Thomas Henderson – Handclaps

== Charts ==
Chart (1977)	Peak position
Billboard Pop Albums	154
Billboard Top Soul Albums	29

=== Singles ===
Year	Single	Chart positions
Year	Single	US Soul
1977	"Especially for You"	70
