= List of Billboard number-one R&B albums of 1972 =

These are the Billboard magazine R&B albums that reached number-one in 1972. Of note, Billboard suspended publishing of the R&B Albums chart from August 26 to October 7, so no albums were posted in that time.

== Chart history ==
| Issue date | Album | Artist |
|---|---|---|
| January 1 | There's a Riot Goin' On | Sly & the Family Stone |
| January 8 | There's a Riot Goin' On | Sly & the Family Stone |
| January 15 | Black Moses | Isaac Hayes |
| January 22 | Black Moses | Isaac Hayes |
| January 29 | Black Moses | Isaac Hayes |
| February 5 | Black Moses | Isaac Hayes |
| February 12 | Black Moses | Isaac Hayes |
| February 19 | Black Moses | Isaac Hayes |
| February 26 | Black Moses | Isaac Hayes |
| March 4 | Solid Rock | The Temptations |
| March 11 | Solid Rock | The Temptations |
| March 18 | Let's Stay Together | Al Green |
| March 25 | Let's Stay Together | Al Green |
| April 1 | Let's Stay Together | Al Green |
| April 8 | Let's Stay Together | Al Green |
| April 15 | Let's Stay Together | Al Green |
| April 22 | Let's Stay Together | Al Green |
| April 29 | Let's Stay Together | Al Green |
| May 6 | Let's Stay Together | Al Green |
| May 13 | Let's Stay Together | Al Green |
| May 20 | Let's Stay Together | Al Green |
| May 27 | First Take | Roberta Flack |
| June 3 | First Take | Roberta Flack |
| June 10 | A Lonely Man | The Chi-Lites |
| June 17 | A Lonely Man | The Chi-Lites |
| June 24 | A Lonely Man | The Chi-Lites |
| July 1 | A Lonely Man | The Chi-Lites |
| July 8 | A Lonely Man | The Chi-Lites |
| July 15 | Still Bill | Bill Withers |
| July 22 | Still Bill | Bill Withers |
| July 29 | Still Bill | Bill Withers |
| August 5 | Still Bill | Bill Withers |
| August 12 | Still Bill | Bill Withers |
| August 19 | Still Bill | Bill Withers |
| October 14 | Super Fly | Curtis Mayfield / Soundtrack |
| October 21 | Super Fly | Curtis Mayfield / Soundtrack |
| October 28 | Super Fly | Curtis Mayfield / Soundtrack |
| November 4 | Super Fly | Curtis Mayfield / Soundtrack |
| November 11 | Super Fly | Curtis Mayfield / Soundtrack |
| November 18 | Super Fly | Curtis Mayfield / Soundtrack |
| November 25 | All Directions | The Temptations |
| December 2 | I'm Still In Love With You | Al Green |
| December 9 | I'm Still In Love With You | Al Green |
| December 16 | I'm Still In Love With You | Al Green |
| December 23 | I'm Still In Love With You | Al Green |
| December 30 | I'm Still In Love With You | Al Green |

== See also ==
- 1972 in music
- R&B number-one hits of 1972 (USA)
