= Frank Reed (singer) =

American singer-songwriter

- Born: Frank Kevin Reed; September 16, 1954; Omaha, Nebraska, U.S.
- Origin: Chicago, Illinois, U.S.
- Died: February 26, 2014 (aged 59) Chicago, Illinois, U.S.
- Genres: R&B; Soul
- Occupations: Singer; songwriter
- Years active: 1988–2014
- Formerly of: The Chi-Lites

Frank Kevin "Tchallah" Reed (September 16, 1954 – February 26, 2014) was an American singer-songwriter. Reed was best known as the first replacement lead singer for the American vocal group The Chi-Lites. He replaced original lead singer and songwriter Eugene Record in 1988 after The Chi-Lites heyday.

== Career ==
Reed joined the Chi-Lites in 1988, as the successor to former lead singer Eugene Record. Along with original members Thompson and Robert "Squirrel" Lester, and the other lead vocalist Anthony Watson (whom had previously replaced Reed in the band on several occasions), Reed recorded the studio album, Help Wanted (Heroes Are in Short Supply) in 1998. Despite singing lead on five of the twelve tracks, and his likeness appearing on the album cover, Reed is not credited as a vocalist and his name is not mentioned on the album.

Reed was one of the lead vocalists of Michigan Avenue, a local band in Chicago created by former Chi-Lites member, Clarence Johnson. When Michigan Avenue disbanded, Reed was told by Johnson that Record was departing from the Chi-Lites and that they were looking for a new lead singer. Reed auditioned for Marshall Thompson, and his wife Constance. They liked his sound and Reed became a member of the Chi-Lites. He was the longest performing member behind the original members, Thompson and Lester. He twice appeared on-stage alongside his predecessor, Eugene Record. Reed was the older brother of the actor, Darryl Alan Reed, and the first cousin of the singer Laurneá.

== Death ==
Reed died on February 26, 2014, in Chicago, Illinois, aged 59.
