= No Time for Love =

No Time for Love may refer to:

- No Time for Love (EP), an EP by Eighteen Visions
- No Time for Love (1943 film), a romantic comedy film
- Lucky: No Time for Love, a 2005 Hindi-language film
- No Time for Love (2009 film), a Danish film, starring Tuva Novotny
- Kadhalikka Neramillai (lit. 'No Time for Love'), 1964 Indian Tamil-language film by C. V. Sridhar
- Kadhalikka Neramillai (TV series), Indian television series
- Kadhalikka Neramillai (2025 film), an Indian Tamil-language romantic comedy film

== See also ==
- A Time for Love (disambiguation)
