= (For God's Sake) Give More Power to the People =

Studio album by the Chi-Lites
- Released: July 1971
- Recorded: 1970–1971
- Genres: R&B, soul
- Length: 35:53
- Label: Brunswick
- Producer: Eugene Record

The Chi-Lites chronology
I Like Your Lovin' (1970)	(For God's Sake) Give More Power to the People (1971)	A Lonely Man (1972)

Singles from (For God's Sake) Give More Power to the People
- 1. "(For God's Sake) Give More Power to the People" Released: 1971; 2. "We Are Neighbors" Released: 1971; 3. "I Want to Pay You Back (For Loving Me)" Released: 1971; 4. "Have You Seen Her" Released: 1971

Professional ratings
Review scores
Source	Rating
AllMusic	4.5/5 stars
Christgau's Record Guide	A−
The Rolling Stone Record Guide	5/5 stars

(For God's Sake) Give More Power to the People is the third studio album by American soul group the Chi-Lites, produced and largely written by lead singer Eugene Record. The album was released in 1971 on the Brunswick label.

== History ==
The album includes the hit single "Have You Seen Her", which reached No. 1 on the R&B chart and No. 3 on Billboard Hot 100. It was also successful on the UK Singles Chart, reaching No. 32. The song was later covered by MC Hammer in 1990. The title track, which peaked at No. 26 on the Billboard Hot 100, No. 4 on the RB chart, and No. 32 on the UK Singles Chart, was featured on the soundtrack to the 1995 film Panther. Two other singles, "We Are Neighbors" and "I Want to Pay You Back (For Loving Me)", were released to moderate success. The album was the first of four consecutive Chi-Lites albums to make the R&B top 5, peaking at No. 3. It also reached at No. 12 on the pop chart.

== Track listing ==
All songs written by Eugene Record, additional writers where noted.

Side one
No.	Title	Writer(s)	Length
1.	"Yes I'm Ready (If I Don't Get To Go)"	Revé Gipson	4:14
2.	"We Are Neighbors"	Quinton Joseph	3:41
3.	"I Want to Pay You Back (For Loving Me)"		4:41
4.	"Have You Seen Her"	Barbara Acklin	5:08
5.	"(For God's Sake) Give More Power to the People"		2:58

Side two
No.	Title	Writer(s)	Length
6.	"Love Uprising"		2:32
7.	"Troubles a' Comin'"		3:15
8.	"You Got Me Walkin'"		2:40
9.	"What Do I Wish For"	Carl Davis	2:48

Notes:

- "Trouble's a' Comin'" and "What Do I Wish For" had previously appeared on the band's second and debut albums, respectively.
- On cassette versions of the album, "I Want to Pay You Back (For Loving Me)" is moved to the start of the second side.

== Personnel ==
- Marshall Thompson – vocals
- Robert "Squirrel" Lester – vocals
- Creadel "Red" Jones – vocals
- Eugene Record – producer, arranger, vocals
- Willie Henderson, Quinton Joseph – directors
- Thomas "Tom Tom" Washington, Sonny Sanders – arrangers
- Bruce Swedien – recording engineer

== Charts ==
=== Weekly charts ===
Album
Chart (1971)	Peak position
U.S. Billboard Top LPs	12
U.S. Billboard Top Soul LPs	3

=== Singles ===
Year	Single	Peak chart positions	
Year	Single	US	US R&B
1971	"(For God's Sake) Give More Power to the People"	26	4
1971	"We Are Neighbors"	70	17
1971	"I Want to Pay You Back (For Loving Me)"	95	35
1971	"Have You Seen Her"	3	1
