= Anthony Reynard Watson =

American soul singer (1957–2021)

Anthony Reynard Watson (March 3, 1957 – July 1, 2021) was an American soul singer, who toured and recorded (off and on) with The Chi-Lites in the late 1980s and 1990s.

== Career ==
Anthony Reynard Watson was born in Mobile, Alabama on March 3, 1957.

Watson's career began with the group Return Ticket in Europe; he later toured with the group Praze. His eponymous album was released by Amherst Records in 1985, as well as such singles as Solid Love Affair, She Will Never Wait Forever, and Missing You Tonight.

After meeting Chi-Lites' founder Marshall Thompson, Watson joined the group as lead vocalist in the late 1980s. He would leave the Chi-Lites twice during the nineties, with his predecessor Frank Reed returning in his absence. 9 Days of October was released during his first leave; after a return and re-exit, he worked on an album produced by Betty Wright that did not get released, entitled 'Ain't No End to the Rainbow'.

Watson would continue to tour off and on with the Chi-Lites until 2002. He died on July 1, 2021, at the age of 64.
