= A Time for Love =

A Time for Love may refer to:

- Time for Love (film), a 1935 American animated film
- A Time for Love (film), a 1970 Hong Kong film
- Time for Love (radio program), a 1953–1954 American radio drama
- A Time for Love (Arturo Sandoval album), 2010
- A Time for Love (Tony Bennett album), 1966
- A Time for Love (TV series), a 1972 Australian television series
- Time for Love (Freddie Jackson album), 1992
- Time for Love (Bill Tarmey album), 1994
- "A Time for Love", a song written by Johnny Mandel and Paul Francis Webster for the film An American Dream, 1966

== See also ==
- No Time for Love (disambiguation)
