= Oh Girl =

1972 single by the Chi-Lites

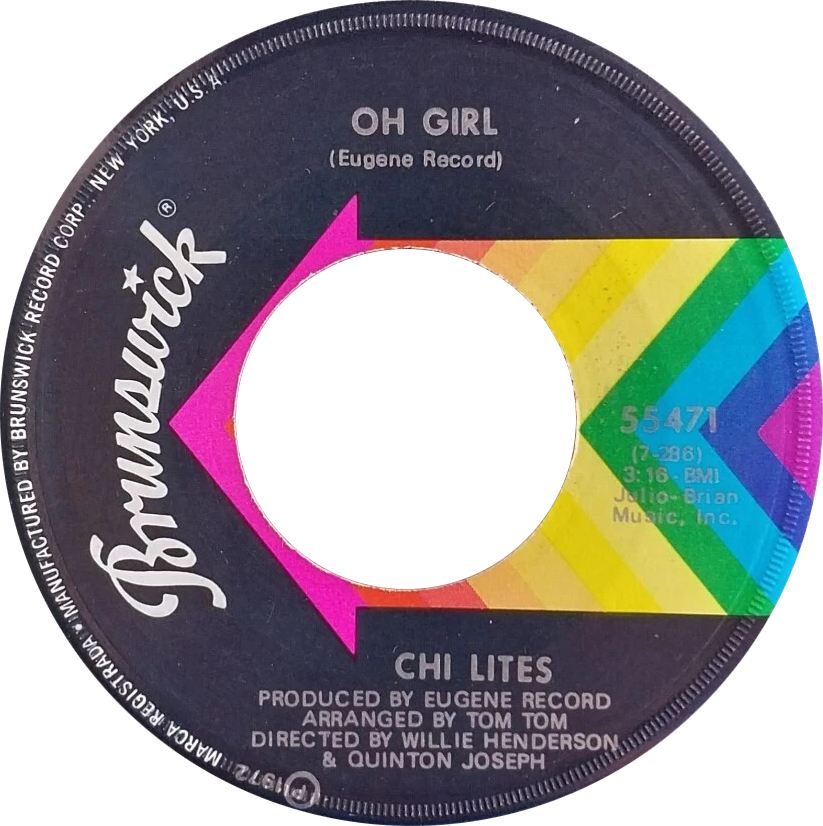
- One of side-A labels of the US single

Single by the Chi-Lites

from the album A Lonely Man
- B-side: "Being in Love"
- Released: March 2, 1972
- Genre: R&B, soul
- Length: 3:43 (album version); 3:16 (single edit)
- Label: Brunswick
- Songwriter: Eugene Record
- Producer: Eugene Record

The Chi-Lites singles chronology
"Have You Seen Her" (1971)	"Oh Girl" (1972)	"The Coldest Days of My Life" (1972)

"Oh Girl" is a song written by Eugene Record and recorded by the American soul vocal group the Chi-Lites, with Record on vocals and also producing. It was released as a single on Brunswick Records in 1972. Included on the group's 1972 album A Lonely Man, "Oh Girl" centers on a relationship on the verge of break-up.

"Oh Girl" was the Chi-Lites' first and only No. 1 single on the Billboard Hot 100, peaking at that position in May 1972 for one week. The single also reached the top position of the Billboard R&B Singles chart the following month, remaining in that position for two weeks. Billboard ranked it as the No. 13 song for 1972. In addition, it reached No. 14 on the UK Singles Chart in July 1972, and was a UK hit again in 1975 when reissued as a double A-side with "Have You Seen Her", this time reaching a new peak of No. 5.

The song prominently features a harmonica.

== Charts ==
=== Weekly charts ===
Chart (1972)	Peak position
Australia (Kent Music Report)	58
Canada RPM Top Singles	9
UK Singles Chart	14
US Billboard Hot 100	1
US R&B (Billboard)	1
US Cash Box Top 100	1

Chart (1975)	Peak position
UK Singles Chart	5

=== Year-end charts ===
Chart (1972)	Rank
Canada	11
US Billboard Hot 100	13
US Billboard R&B	5
US Cash Box Top 100	33

== Personnel ==
- Eugene Record – lead vocals, guitar, bass, composer, producer
- Robert "Squirrel" Lester – vocals
- Creadel "Red" Jones – vocals
- Marshall Thompson – vocals, harmonica, melodica
- Floyd Morris – piano
- Quinton Joseph – drums
- Tom Tom (Thomas Washington) – arranger

== Paul Young version ==
"Oh Girl"
- Standard non-North American artwork

Single by Paul Young

from the album Other Voices
- B-side: "Leaving Home"
- Released: June 25, 1990
- Genre: Soft rock
- Length: 3:33
- Label: Columbia
- Songwriter: Eugene Record
- Producer: Pete Wingfield

Paul Young singles chronology
"Softly Whispering I Love You" (1990)	"Oh Girl" (1990)	"Heaven Can Wait" (1990)

The track was most prominently covered in 1990 by Paul Young, from his album Other Voices. It became a top 10 hit in the U.S. (#8) and Canada (#4). It was also a major adult contemporary hit, reaching number one on both the US and Canadian Adult Contemporary charts.

=== Charts ===
Chart (1990)	Peak position
Australia (ARIA Charts)	111
Canada Adult Contemporary (RPM)	1
Canada Top Singles (RPM)	4
Europe (Eurochart Hot 100)	64
Ireland (IRMA)	20
Netherlands (Single Top 100)	73
New Zealand (RIANZ)	41
UK Singles (Official Charts Company)	25
US Billboard Hot 100	8
US Adult Contemporary (Billboard)	1
US Cash Box Top 100	6

Chart (1990)	Rank
Canada Top Singles (RPM)	27
US Billboard Hot 100	84

== Other versions ==
- Country music singer Con Hunley took his version of the song to number 12 on the Billboard Hot Country Singles chart in 1982 with the Oak Ridge Boys on background vocals.
- In 1987, Glenn Jones had a moderate hit with his version on the US Soul singles chart, at No. 38.
- In 2026, Bruno Mars sang his version as part of The Romantic Tour as part of his list of oldies.
