= Have You Seen Her =

1971 single by the Chi-Lites

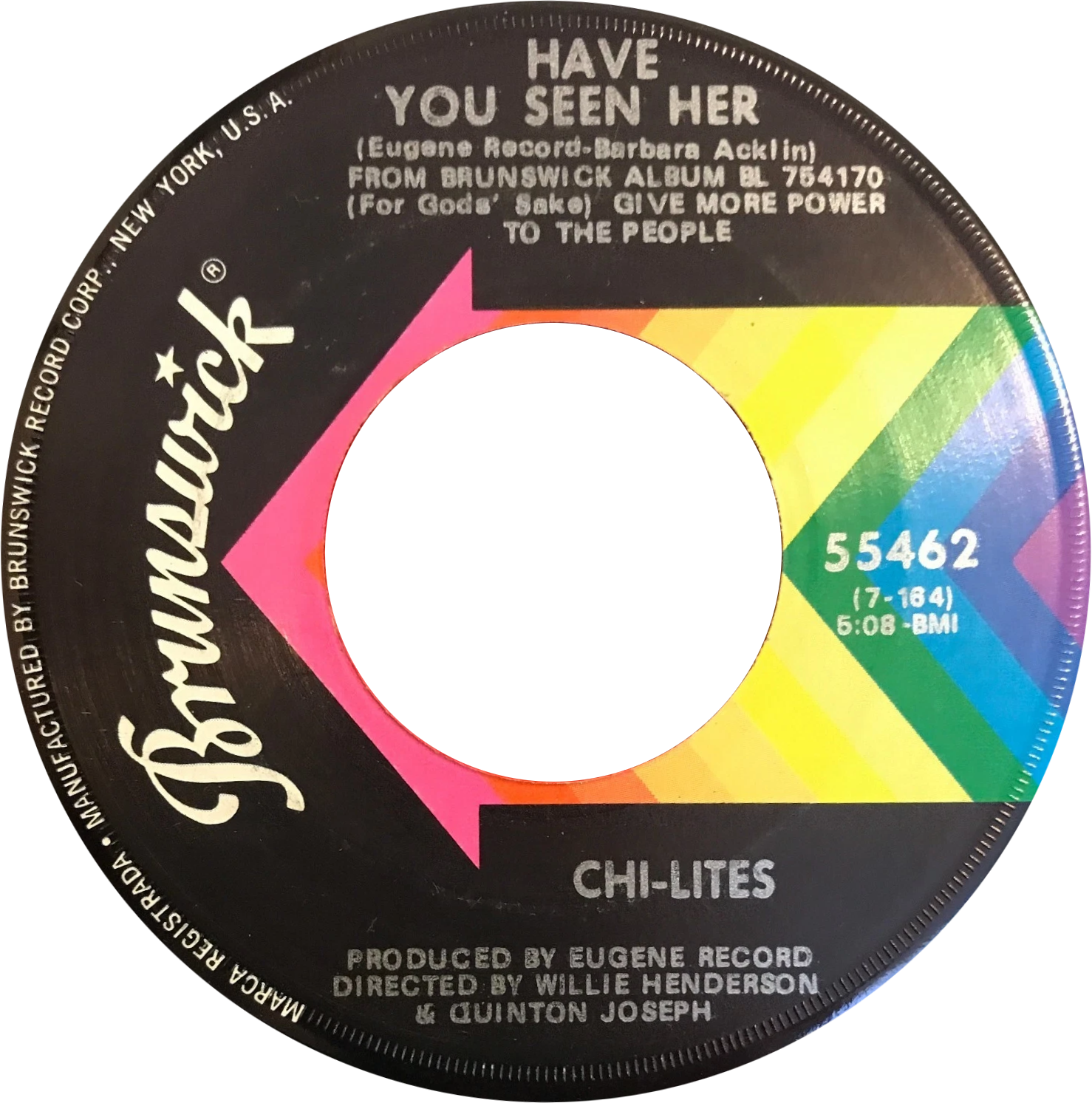
- One of side-A labels of the US single

Single by the Chi-Lites

from the album (For God's Sake) Give More Power to the People
- B-side: "Yes I'm Ready (If I Don't Get to Go)"
- Released: October 1971
- Recorded: 1971
- Genre: Soul; R&B
- Length: 5:08
- Label: Brunswick; B 55462
- Songwriters: Barbara Acklin, Eugene Record
- Producer: Eugene Record

The Chi-Lites singles chronology
"I Want to Pay You Back (For Loving Me)" (1971)	"Have You Seen Her" (1971)	"Oh Girl" (1971)

Official Audio
- "Have You Seen Her" on YouTube

"Have You Seen Her" is a song by American soul vocal group the Chi-Lites, released via Brunswick Records in October 1971. Composed by the lead singer Eugene Record and Barbara Acklin, the song was included on the group's 1971 album (For God's Sake) Give More Power to the People.

The song begins and ends with a spoken narrator remarking on how he was once happy with a woman. However, she left him, so he passes the days by partaking in leisure activities, where he tries to get relief by telling jokes to the children:

One month ago today
I was happy as a lark
But now I go for walks
To the movies, maybe to the park
I have a seat on the same old bench
To watch the children play, huh
You know tomorrow is their future
But for me just another day
They all gather 'round me, huh
They seem to know my name
We laugh, tell a few jokes
But it still doesn't ease my pain

Much to his dismay, the woman does not return or attempt to communicate with him as he had hoped. The narrator ends the song, in a spoken voice, musing on how foolish he was for believing the woman of his dreams would always be around, thinking that he had her in the palm of his hand. Some radio edits have omitted the spoken dialogue. The song peaked at No. 3 on the Billboard Hot 100, and reached the top of the Billboard R&B Singles chart in November 1971. It also reached No. 3 on the UK Singles Chart in February 1972, and was a UK hit again in 1975 when reissued as a double A-side with "Oh Girl", this time peaking at No. 5.

There are two commonly available versions. The original 45 and LP version, and a remix that features the fuzz guitar continuing from 0:29 to 0:40 and the background vocals at the beginning having more reverb - this version was issued on their 1972 Greatest Hits album and then in the UK in 1975 as a double a-side with "Oh Girl" and reaching No. 5 (after the original had charted in early 1972 at No. 3).

== Charts ==
=== Weekly charts ===
Chart (1971–1972)	Peak position
Canada RPM Top Singles	47
Ireland (IRMA)	11
UK Singles Chart	3
US Billboard Hot 100	3
US Billboard Hot R&B/Hip-Hop Songs	1

Chart (1975)	Peak position
UK	5

=== Year-end charts ===
Chart (1972)	Position
UK	39

== MC Hammer version ==
"Have You Seen Her"

Single by MC Hammer

from the album Please Hammer Don't Hurt 'Em
- Released: June 1990
- Length: 4:43 (album version); 3:55 (single version)
- Label: Capitol
- Songwriters: Eugene Record; MC Hammer; Barbara Acklin
- Producer: MC Hammer

MC Hammer singles chronology
"U Can't Touch This" (1990)	"Have You Seen Her" (1990)	"Pray" (1990)

The most significant cover of "Have You Seen Her" was recorded by MC Hammer, for his successful 1990 LP, Please Hammer Don't Hurt 'Em, which reached No. 4 on both the US Billboard Hot 100 and the US Cash Box Top 100. It also peaked at No. 8 on the UK singles chart.

=== Charts ===
==== Weekly charts ====
Chart (1990)	Peak position
Australia (ARIA)	42
Austria (Ö3 Austria Top 40)	20
Belgium (Ultratop 50 Flanders)	13
Canada Top Singles (RPM)	8
Europe (Eurochart Hot 100)	15
Finland (Suomen virallinen lista)	6
Germany (GfK)	10
Ireland (IRMA)	5
Luxembourg (Radio Luxembourg)	5
Netherlands (Dutch Top 40)	3
Netherlands (Single Top 100)	2
New Zealand (Recorded Music NZ)	4
Portugal (AFP)	6
Sweden (Sverigetopplistan)	18
Switzerland (Schweizer Hitparade)	12
UK Singles (Official Charts)	8
US Billboard Hot 100	4
US Hot Black Singles (Billboard)	4
US Hot Rap Singles (Billboard)	9
US Cash Box Top 100	4

==== Year-end charts ====
Chart (1990)	Position
Belgium (Ultratop)	81
Netherlands (Dutch Top 40)	38
Netherlands (Single Top 100)	34
New Zealand (RIANZ)	20
Sweden (Topplistan)	97
US Billboard Hot 100	47
US Hot R&B Singles (Billboard)	52
US Cash Box Top 100	30

=== Certifications ===
Region	Certification	Certified units/sales
United States (RIAA)	Gold	500,000^{^}
^{^} Shipments figures based on certification alone.

=== Release history ===
Region	Date	Format(s)	Label(s)	Ref.
United States	June 1990	12-inch vinyl; cassette	Capitol	
Australia	August 20, 1990	7-inch vinyl; cassette	Capitol	
Japan	September 12, 1990	Mini-CD	Capitol	

== In pop culture ==
- The Barron Knights produced a parody version.
- The song was included in the 2001 list of songs that Clear Channel Communications warned its radio stations that they "might not want to play" after 9/11.
- The song was featured in the 2026 video game Mixtape.
