= Chi-Sound Records =

- Founded: 1976
- Status: active
- Distributors: United Artists Records (1976 - 1978); 20th Century-Fox Records (1978 - 1981); Independent (1982 - 1983, 1989 - 1990, 2007 - present)
- Genre: various
- Country of origin: United States
- Official website: Chi-Sound

Chi-Sound Records is an independent record label set up in 1976 by established Chicago record producer Carl Davis. He had been involved in the music industry since the early 1960s working with locally based record labels, including Vee-Jay and Okeh, a subsidiary of the major Columbia Records. He produced the number one hit by Gene Chandler, "Duke of Earl" for Vee-Jay. Later, as A&R chief for Okeh, he produced a run of hits with writer/singer Curtis Mayfield, for another Chicago artist, Major Lance, including "The Monkey Time" and "Um, Um, Um, Um, Um, Um". Davis left Okeh after it was merged with Epic Records in a dispute with Epic management over side projects outside Epic/Okeh.

== History ==
In the mid-60s, Davis took over creative control of Brunswick Records (at that time a subsidiary of Decca Records) and oversaw many hits for that label and another label Davis founded, Dakar Records, over the next five to six years for Chicago artists like The Chi-Lites, Tyrone Davis (no relation), Barbara Acklin, The Artistics, Young-Holt, and Gene Chandler, as well as Jackie Wilson. In June 1976 Davis left Brunswick to found his own label.

Originally distributed as a custom label by United Artists Records, the output, including several albums by Walter Jackson, was moderately successful. In 1978, it switched its distribution to 20th Century-Fox Records, which saw Davis signing up other previously successful Chicago-based artists. Gene Chandler recorded the #3 Billboard R&B hit, "Get Down", a huge disco hit in 1978/79, and Davis then brought on board The Chi-Lites (with lead vocalist and producer Eugene Record also taking an executive post), The Dells and The Impressions. Other important R&B hits included "Does She Have A Friend" by Chandler and "Hot On A Thing" by The Chi-Lites.

When the Fox deal ended in 1981 (at the same time was sold to PolyGram in 1981 and absorbed into Casablanca Records), Chi-Sound was wound down with Davis using independent distribution for spasmodic releases for 2 years. Gene Chandler stayed for one more minor hit but the other acts moved on. Due to financial problems, Chi-Sound ceased operations in 1983. It had a brief revival in 1989, but folded again in 1990.

Davis reactivated the Chi-Sound label in January 2007, venturing into hip-hop in addition to R&B.

== See also ==
- Chicago soul
- List of record labels
