= Robert "Squirrel" Lester =

American singer–songwriter (1942–2010)

- Lester, c. 1970s.

Background information
- Born: Robert Earl Lester; August 16, 1942; McComb, Mississippi, U.S.
- Origin: Chicago, Illinois
- Died: January 21, 2010 (aged 67) Chicago, Illinois, U.S.
- Education: Hyde Park Academy High School
- Genres: R&B; Soul
- Occupations: Singer; songwriter
- Instrument: Vocals
- Years active: 1958–2009
- Formerly of: The Chi-Lites (1960–2009)
- Spouse: Ruby Andrews

Robert Earl "Squirrel" Lester (August 16, 1942 – January 21, 2010) was an American singer and songwriter. Lester began his professional career in the late 1950s, and was best known as a founding member of the Chicago-based r&b/soul vocal group The Chi-Lites. Lester, a second tenor, was a part of the group from 1960 until 2009.

== Biography ==
=== Early life and education ===
Lester was born one of four children in McComb, Mississippi to Ann Hines. The family relocated to Chicago, Illinois when he was a young child. For high school, Lester attended Hyde Park Academy High School in the Chicago's Woodlawn neighborhood.

=== Career ===
Lester met Marshall Thompson, Creadal "Red" Jones and Eugene Record in elementary school. Lester first started singing with the Chanteurs, which included Eugene Reccord, at around age 14. The Chanteurs competed with another group, the Desideros (which Thompson and Jones were part of) at south side talent shows. In 1960, Lester and Reccord became members of the Hi-Lites, a group created when the Desideros and the Chanteurs decided to combine. Due to another group having the name Hi-Lites, the group later renamed themselves the Chi-Lites to reflect their hometown. As a member of the Chi-Lites, Lester helped the group obtain 11 top 20 R&B songs, including hits like "Have You Seen Her?" and "Oh, Girl". He performed all over the world, including Japan, Germany, Korea, Greenland, and the Apollo Theater in Harlem, New York City. In later years, Lester was included in the Chi-Lites' line-up, along with group leader Thompson, lead vocalist Frank Reed, and backing vocalist Tara Thompson. Lester's last performance with the group was in August of 2009. Lester was inducted into the Vocal Group Hall of Fame.

=== Personal life and death ===
Lester was married to singer Ruby Andrews at the time of his death. He had at least one child, but some sources claims he had nine children. Lester was diagnosed with liver cancer later in his life. On January 21, 2010, he died at Roseland Hospital in Chicago, Illinois after a long battle with liver cancer. He was 67 years old.
