= The Chi-Lites =

American R&B/soul vocal group from Chicago, Illinois

- The Chi-Lites 1973 promotional photo, also used on the back cover of their album A Letter to Myself

Background information
- Also known as: Marshall & the Chi-Lites, Hi-Lites, Senior Varieties
- Origin: Chicago, Illinois, United States
- Genres: R&B; soul
- Years active: 1959–present
- Labels: Brunswick; Mercury
- Members: Marshall Thompson; Tara Thompson
- Past members: Robert "Squirrel" Lester*; Eugene Record*; Creadel "Red" Jones*; Clarence Johnson*; Stanley Anderson; Burt Bowen*; Eddie Reed*; Willie Kinsey; David "Doc" Roberson; David Scott; Danny Johnson; Vandy Hampton; Frank Reed; Anthony Reynard Watson; Fred Simon; Warren Tipton; (*) Original members
- Website: chi-litesofficial.com

The Chi-Lites (/ˈʃaɪlaɪts/, SHY-lytes) is an American R&B/soul vocal quartet from Chicago. Forming at Chicago's Hyde Park High School in 1959, the group's original lineup consisted of singers Robert Lester, Eugene Record, Creadel Jones, Clarence Johnson, Burt Bowen, Eddie Reed and Marshall Thompson.

The Chi-Lites' greatest fame came during the late 1960s through the early 1970s (with members Record, Jones, Lester and Thompson), scoring eleven top-ten R&B chart hits from 1969 until 1974. The group also charted 21 songs in the Billboard Hot 100 Pop Chart, and had chart hits in Australia, the United Kingdom, Ireland, and Canada, as well as in the U.S.

== History ==
=== Forming and early career ===
The original members were lead singer Eugene Record, Robert "Squirrel" Lester, Clarence Johnson, Burt Bowen, and Eddie Reed of the Chanteurs. The group was formed at Hyde Park Academy High School where majority of the members attended (Record attended Englewood High School and Thompson would later transfer to DuSable High School in his senior year and study music under Walter Dyett) in Chicago in 1959. The group performed at their High School "Senior Varieties" talent show. Soon after, they released a single written by Johnson, "You've Got a Great Love". Bowen left the group and was replaced by Sollie McElroy of the Flamingos, who was soon replaced by Marshall Thompson of the Desideros. In 1960, Reed died and Thompson brought in Creadel "Red" Jones who was a member of the Desideros to replace him. In early 1964 the group changed their name to the Hi-Lites and released a song, "I'm So Jealous", with Record on lead.

Noting that the name Hi-lites was already in use and wanting to honor their home town they changed their name to Marshall & the Chi-Lites in 1964. Under their new name they recorded four songs: "Pretty Girl" written by Record, who also was on lead, "Love Bandit" written by Jones with Thompson on lead, "Price of Love" and "Baby It's Time". Clarence Johnson left the group later that year, and their name was subsequently shortened to the Chi-Lites. Eugene Record was the musical group's sole songwriter and lead singer. Record never collaborated with members outside his singing group. In 1968, the group met with record producer Carl Davis and signed a contract with Brunswick Records out of Chicago. The Chi-Lites with members Record, Thompson, Lester and Jones recorded their first charting song, "Give It Away" written by Davis and Record. The single became a top ten Billboard R&B hit spending nine weeks on the chart and peaking at No. 10 on March 15, 1969.

=== 1971–1979 ===
Their major hits came in 1971 and 1972, "Have You Seen Her" and "Oh Girl", the latter becoming a number one single on the Billboard Hot 100 on May 27, 1972. Each sold over one million copies and was awarded a gold disc by the RIAA. Other transatlantic chart hits followed, although their output became more fragmented as the group's personnel came and went. Bass-singer Jones left in 1973, and was replaced in quick succession by Stanley Anderson, Willie Kinsey, and then Doc Roberson. Shortly thereafter, Eugene Record left, and David Scott and Danny Johnson entered. More personnel changes ensued, when Johnson was replaced by Vandy Hampton in 1977. The Chi-lites cut some tracks for the Inphasion label in 1979, which appeared on an obscure album for the Excello label.

=== 1980–1999 ===
In 1980 Thompson, Record, Jones and Lester re-formed the group. But Creadel Jones left for a second time in 1982, and the group would remain a trio. In 1983 the group released the critically acclaimed Bottoms Up album and achieved notable club and R&B chart success with the title track and "Changing For You." Released on LARC Records, the album was also released in the UK on the R&B label under the distribution wing of PRT. "Changing For You" album version was released in the UK as a 12" single which became popular in London clubs, including Flicks in Dartford and The Goldmine in Canvey Island. "Changing For You" also remained on the Caister Weekender playlist for two years. "Changing for You" and the title track "Bottoms Up" were heavily played and promoted by UK jazz funk soul DJ Robbie Vincent. An edited version of "Changing for You" entered the UK Singles Chart and reached No. 61. Record left again in 1988, and new lead Frank Reed joined to replace him. Singer Anthony Reynard Watson replaced Reed later that year and the duty of lead vocals would alternate between Reed and Watson over the course of the next decade. (Lester took over singing lead on "Oh Girl", while Watson led on their other songs).

In 1997, while returning home from a concert in Pennsylvania, the Chi-Lites were involved in a serious car crash which resulted in both Reed and Thompson's wife Constance being ejected from the vehicle. Constance died from her injuries and Reed had to have a metal plate inserted in his back. "Hold On to Your Dreams" was included on the Help Wanted (Heroes are in Short Supply) album in Constance's honor. Reed was subsequently replaced once again by Watson until Watson's permanent departure in 2002. On December 13, 1999, BMI named The Chi-Lites, "Oh Girl" No. 36 of the top 100 songs of the century (1900-1999).

=== 1999–present ===
In 2003, the Chi-Lites 1970 hit "Are You My Woman? (Tell Me So)" was sampled by Beyonce in her song "Crazy in Love," and their 1974 song "That's How Long" was used as the backdrop for one of the tracks on Jay-Z's Black Album. In March 2004, the group reunited with former lead Eugene Record for a PBS Soul Music special. Record died in July 2005 following a long battle with cancer. Marshall Thompson and Squirrel Lester, along with more recent addition Frank Reed and the group's first female member, wife Tara Thompson, continued as the Chi-Lites, recording and touring over the last two decades with other soul groups such as the Stylistics and Ray, Goodman & Brown. In 2005 the group released the single "Mother Love". Lester died in January 2010, leaving Thompson the sole remaining founding member of the group. Lester was replaced by Fred Simon (formerly of The Lost Generation). In February 2014, Reed died after an illness. In 2018, Warren Tipton, the father of rapper Freddie Gibbs, joined the group. Fred Simon died in April 2026.

As of 2026, Thompson continues the Chi-Lites' legacy as the last surviving member. On June 17, 2020, Hollywood Walk of Fame announced their Class of 2021 to receive stars on Hollywood Boulevard, and the Chi-Lites were named as one of the honorees.

Warren Tipton died on May 9, 2026.

== Honors ==
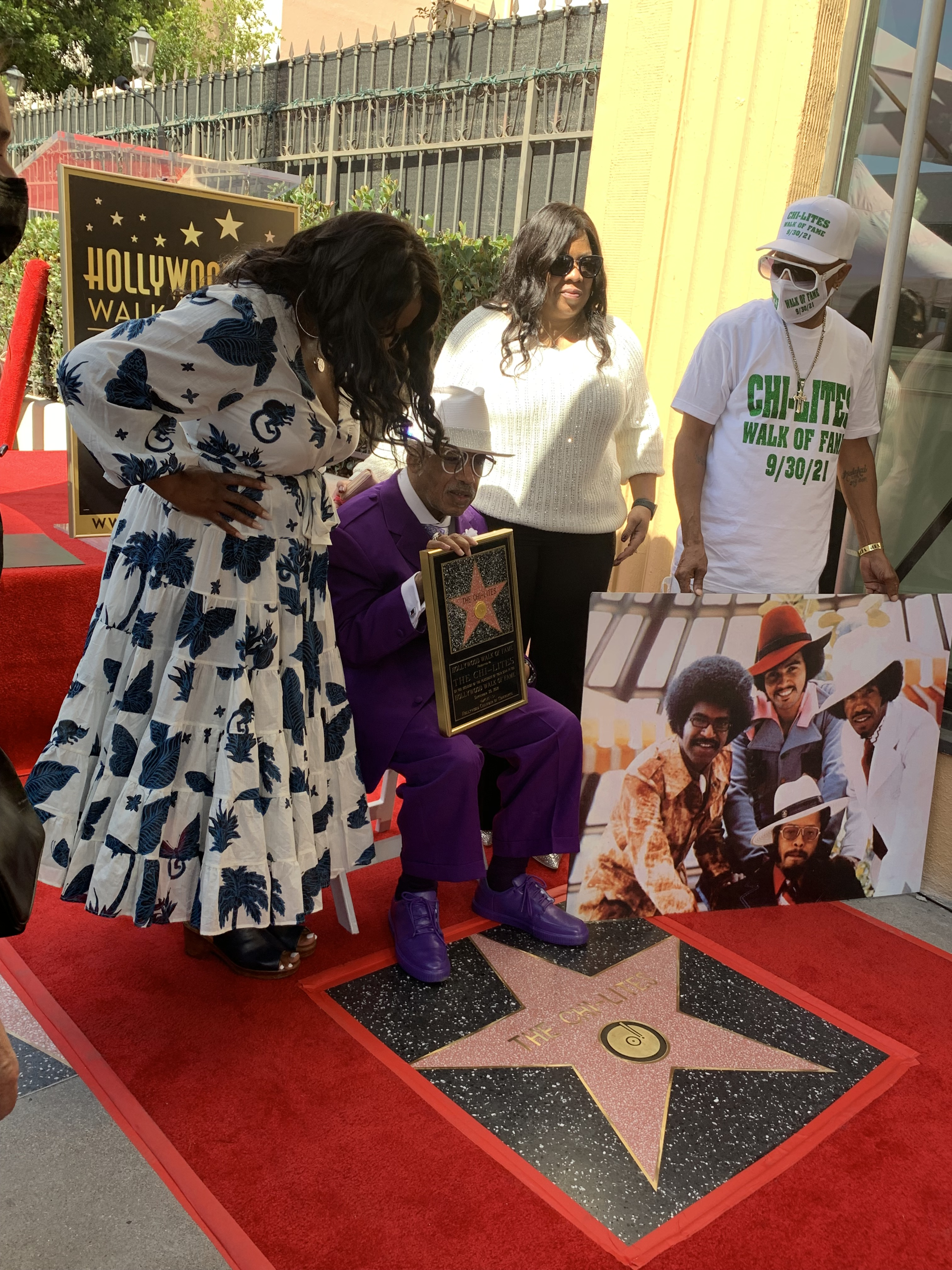
Marshall Thompson, the last surviving founding member of the group, receives the star for the group on the Hollywood Walk of Fame, September 2021.

The group was inducted into the Rhythm and Blues Foundation in 2000 and Record appeared with the group on stage to perform and accept the award.

The group was inducted into the Vocal Group Hall of Fame in 2005 and the R&B Music Hall of Fame on August 17, 2013, at the Waetejen Auditorium in Cleveland.

On September 30, 2021, the Chi-Lites received star number 2,702 on the Hollywood Walk of Fame. The award presenters were SiriusXM radio personality Jeff Foxx from New York and Jimmie Walker, best known for his role as J.J. on Good Times. Joining Marshall Thompson was the current group his wife Tara Thompson, Fred Simon, Warren Tipton and Mack Miller. Former original Chi-Lites, now deceased, Eugene Record, Robert Squirrel Lester, and Creadel Red Jones will also be remembered.

On April 26, 2024, The Chi-Lites along with Dionne Warwick were inducted into the Atlantic City Walk of Fame at Brighton Park. Presenters Wil Hart (original member of The Delfonics), Leroy Burgess, Stuart Bascombe and Russell Patterson (original members of Black Ivory), Cliff Perkins (original member of Soul Generation) and Marvin Brown (original member of The Unifics) inducted The Chi-Lites as the 6th honorees into the Atlantic City Walk of Fame.

== Personnel ==
Current members

- Marshall Thompson – 1959–present
- Tara Thompson – 1998–present
- Mack Miller – 2014–present

Former members

- Robert "Squirrel" Lester – 1959–2010
- Eugene Record – 1959–1973, 1980–1988
- Creadel "Red" Jones – 1959–1973, 1980–1982
- Clarence Johnson – 1959–1964
- Fred Simon – 2010–2026
- Warren Tipton – 2018–2023

Sidemen

- Stanley Anderson – 1973
- Willie Kinsey – 1973
- David "Doc" Roberson – 1973
- David Scott – 1976–1980
- Danny Johnson – 1976–1977
- Vandy Hampton – 1976–1980
- Frank Reed – 1988, 1990–1993, 1996–1998, 2001–2014
- Anthony Reynard Watson – 1988–1990, 1993–1996, 1998–2002
- Marzette Griffin – 2015–2018

== Discography ==
- Give It Away (1969)
- I Like Your Lovin' (Do You Like Mine?) (1970)
- (For God's Sake) Give More Power to the People (1971)
- A Lonely Man (1972)
- A Letter to Myself (1973)
- Chi-Lites (1973)
- Toby (1974)
- Half a Love (1975)
- Happy Being Lonely (1976)
- The Fantastic Chi-Lites (1977)
- Heavenly Body (1980)
- Love Your Way Through (1981)
- Me and You (1982)
- Bottom's Up (1983)
- Steppin' Out (1984)
- Just Say You Love Me (1990)
- Help Wanted (1998)
- Low Key (2001)

== Filmography ==
- 1996 – Original Gangstas, as themselves
- 2002 – Only the Strong Survive, as themselves

== Television appearances ==
Soul Train

- December 18, 1971 / Season 1 Episode No. 12
- March 18, 1972 / Season 1 Episode No. 25
- March 31, 1973 / Season 2 Episode No. 24
- October 19, 1974 / Season 4 Episode No. 7
- February 28, 1976 / Season 5 Episode No. 28
- January 31, 1981 / Season 10 Episode No. 16
- April 17, 1982 / Season 11 Episode No. 20

American Bandstand

- January 13, 1973 / Season 16 Episode No. 12
- April 6, 1974 / Season 17 Episode No. 31
- January 18, 1975 / Season 1 Episode No. 12

The Sammy Davis Jr. Show

- January 10, 1976 / Season 2 Episode No. 15

Midnight Special

- September 21, 1973 / Season 2 Episode No. 2

Saturday Night Live

Eugene Record performed "Have You Seen Her" on April 8, 1978.

Into the Night

- October 29, 1990 / Season 1 Episode No. 75
