= Barbara Acklin =

American singer-songwriter (1943–1998)

- Acklin in a promotional photo by Brunswick Records, 1970

Background information
- Also known as: Barbara Allen
- Born: Barbara Jean Acklin; February 28, 1943; Oakland, California, U.S.
- Origin: Chicago, Illinois, U.S.
- Died: November 27, 1998 (aged 55) Omaha, Nebraska, U.S.
- Genres: R&B; soul
- Occupations: Singer; songwriter
- Years active: c.1961–1998
- Labels: St Lawrence; Chess; Brunswick; Chi-Sound; Capitol

Barbara Jean Acklin (February 28, 1943 – November 27, 1998) was an American soul singer and songwriter, who was most successful in the 1960s and 1970s. Her biggest hit as a singer was "Love Makes a Woman" (1968). As a songwriter, she is best known for co-writing the multi-million-selling "Have You Seen Her" (1971) with Eugene Record, lead singer of the Chi-Lites.

== Life and career ==
Acklin was born in Oakland, California and moved with her family to Chicago, Illinois in 1948. She was encouraged to sing as a child; by the age of 11, she sang regularly as a soloist at the New Zion Baptist Church and as a teenager started singing at nightclubs in Chicago. After graduating from Dunbar Vocational High School she worked as a secretary at St. Lawrence Records. Her first record was released on the subsidiary Special Agent label, under the pseudonym Barbara Allen, and was produced by her cousin, producer, and saxophonist Monk Higgins. She also worked as a backing singer at Chess Records on recordings by Fontella Bass, Etta James, Koko Taylor, and others produced by Higgins.

In 1966, she started working as a receptionist at Brunswick Records' Chicago office, where she submitted demo recordings of some of her own songs to producer Carl Davis. One of her songs, "Whispers (Gettin' Louder)", which she had co-written with David Scott, formerly of The Five Du-Tones, was recorded by Jackie Wilson and became his biggest hit for three years, reaching no. 5 on the Billboard R&B chart and no. 11 on the Billboard Hot 100. Wilson then helped secure her a recording contract with Brunswick. Her first two singles for the label were unsuccessful but her third, "Show Me the Way To Go", a duet with Gene Chandler, made the R&B chart. She began writing songs with another Brunswick recording artist, Eugene Record, lead singer of the Chi-Lites; some but not all sources state that they were later married. They co-wrote the Peaches and Herb hit "Two Little Kids", before Record and Davis co-wrote and produced Acklin's first and biggest solo hit, "Love Makes a Woman"; the other co-writers were arranger Sonny Sanders and guitarist Gerald Sims. The single reached no. 3 on the R&B chart and no. 15 on the US pop chart in July 1968, and won a BMI award.

Acklin continued to have a series of hits on Brunswick over the next four years, including "From the Teacher to the Preacher", another duet with Chandler, and solo hits "Just Ain't No Love" and "Am I the Same Girl", produced by Record. The instrumental backing track of "Am I the Same Girl", with piano replacing Acklin's vocal, became a bigger hit when released as "Soulful Strut" by Young-Holt Unlimited. "Am I the Same Girl" was successfully covered by Swing Out Sister in 1992, and in the UK by Dusty Springfield (UK no. 43, 1969). Acklin also released several albums on the Brunswick label: Love Makes a Woman (1968), Seven Days of Night (1969), Someone Else's Arms (1970), I Did It (1971), and I Call It Trouble (1973).

At the same time, she continued her successful writing partnership with Eugene Record. Impressed by the monologues on Isaac Hayes' album Hot Buttered Soul (1969), Record and Acklin wrote "Have You Seen Her", which was originally an album track on the Chi-Lites' album (For God's Sake) Give More Power to the People (1971) before being released as a single. It reached no. 1 on the R&B chart and no. 3 on the US pop chart, and twice made the UK top ten (no. 3 in 1972 and no. 5 in 1975). In 1990, the song became a top ten hit again, when recorded by MC Hammer. Record and Acklin co-wrote several other successful songs for the Chi-Lites, including "Stoned Out of My Mind" (R&B no. 2, 1973), "Toby" (R&B no. 7, 1974), and "Too Good To Be Forgotten" (UK no. 10, 1975).

In 1974, Acklin moved to Capitol Records. Her first single for the label, "Raindrops", was co-written by Acklin and produced by former Brunswick producer, Willie Henderson. It became her biggest hit on the R&B chart for six years (no. 14), and she released an album, A Place in the Sun (1975). However, later recordings met with less success and she was dropped by the label in 1975.

She continued to tour as a solo artist and as a backing singer for the Chi-Lites, Tyrone Davis, and other acts. In 1980, she made some recordings for Carl Davis' Chi-Sound label and contributed backing vocals to Otis Clay's album The Gospel Truth (1993). Acklin later lived in Omaha, Nebraska.

== Death ==
She had begun recording a new album in 1998, when she fell ill and died from pneumonia at the age of 55 in Omaha, Nebraska. She was survived by her son, Marcus White, her daughter, Samotta Acklin, and her godson, Elliot Myrick.

== Discography ==
=== Studio albums ===
Year	Title	Peak chart positions		Record label
Year	Title	US	US R&B	Record label
1968	Love Makes a Woman	146	48	Brunswick
1969	Seven Days of Night	—	—	Brunswick
1970	Someone Else's Arms	—	—	Brunswick
1971	I Did It	—	—	Brunswick
1973	I Call It Trouble	—	—	Brunswick
1975	A Place in the Sun	—	—	Capitol
"—" denotes a recording that did not chart or was not released in that territory.

=== Compilation albums ===
- Groovy Ideas (1987, Kent)
- Greatest Hits (1995, Brunswick)
- Brunswick Singles A's & B's (1999, Edsel)
- 20 Greatest Hits (2002, Brunswick)
- The Brunswick Anthology (2002, Brunswick)
- The Best of Barbara Acklin (2003, Collectables)
- The Complete Barbara Acklin on Brunswick Records (2004, Edsel)

=== Singles ===
Year	Title	Peak chart positions		
Year	Title	US	US R&B	CAN
1966	"I'm Not Mad Anymore"	—	—	—
1967	"Fool, Fool, Fool (Look in the Mirror)"	—	—	—
1967	"I've Got You Baby"	—	—	—
1968	"Show Me the Way to Go" (with Gene Chandler)	—	30	—
1968	"Love Makes a Woman"	15	3	15
1968	"From the Teacher to the Preacher" (with Gene Chandler)	57	16	34
1968	"Just Ain't No Love"	67	23	53
1969	"Am I the Same Girl"	79	33	52
1969	"Little Green Apples" (with Gene Chandler)	—	—	—
1969	"A Raggedy Ride"	—	—	—
1969	"After You"	—	30	—
1970	"Someone Else's Arms"	—	—	—
1970	"I Did It"	121	28	—
1971	"I Can't Do My Thing"	—	—	—
1971	"Lady, Lady, Lady"	—	44	—
1972	"I Call It Trouble"	—	49	—
1973	"I'll Bake Me a Man"	—	—	—
1974	"Raindrops"	—	14	—
1975	"Special Loving"	—	73	—
1975	"Give Me Some of Your Sweet Love"	—	98	—
"—" denotes a recording that did not chart or was not released in that territory.
