= Carl Davis (music producer) =

American record producer and music executive (1934–2012)

Carl H. Davis Sr. (September 19, 1934 – August 9, 2012) was an American record producer and music executive, who was particularly active in Chicago in the 1960s and 1970s. He was responsible for hit R&B records by Gene Chandler, Major Lance, Jackie Wilson, The Chi-Lites, Barbara Acklin, Tyrone Davis and others.

== Life and career ==
Davis was born in Chicago and attended Englewood High School. He began working as an assistant to disc jockey Al Benson on radio station WGES in 1955, and then joined a record marketing company. In the early 1960s, he helped run the small Nat record label which had a local hit with the song "Nite Owl" by the DuKays, produced by Davis. A follow-up release, "Duke of Earl", which Davis also produced, was credited to the group's lead singer Gene Chandler, and became a national no. 1 hit after being leased to the larger Vee-Jay label.

In 1962, Davis began working as a producer and A&R director for the Columbia subsidiary label OKeh, where he produced a number of hit records for Major Lance, Billy Butler and Walter Jackson. Many were characterised as "peppy, brassy arrangements... and danceable, upbeat songs with a Latin tinge," often using songs written by Curtis Mayfield that Mayfield felt were inappropriate for his own group, The Impressions. He also continued to produce records for Gene Chandler and The Artistics, and briefly produced Mary Wells after she left Motown.

In the mid-1960s, he began working for Brunswick Records, where he produced Jackie Wilson's comeback hit, "Whispers" and the million-seller, "(Your Love Keeps Lifting Me) Higher and Higher", Barbara Acklin's "Love Makes a Woman", as well as several early hits by The Chi-Lites. He also formed the Dakar label, which had a long run of hits with Tyrone Davis (no relation), including "Can I Change My Mind" and "Turn Back the Hands of Time," and also found success with Hamilton Bohannon.

When the Dakar label folded in 1976, Davis formed Chi Sound Records, continuing to find success with Walter Jackson and having a major hit single in 1978 with Gene Chandler's "Get Down". After a distribution deal with 20th Century Records ended in 1981, Davis used independent distribution for two years before closing Chi Sound down. The company had a brief revival in 1989–90, before re-opening in 2007 and remained active until Davis' death. On February 11, 2013, Carl Davis was honored during the 55th Grammy Awards, along with several other music business personalities in the memorial pictorial tribute.

Carl Davis' biography, The Man Behind the Music: The Legendary Carl Davis, was published in May 2011, by Life To Legacy, LLC, Matteson IL.

Davis died from pulmonary fibrosis at his home in Summerville, South Carolina, on the morning of August 9, 2012, at the age of 77.
