= Eugene Record =

American musical artist (1940–2005)

- Born: Eugene Booker Record; December 23, 1940; Chicago, Illinois, U.S.
- Died: July 22, 2005 (aged 64) Chicago, Illinois, U.S.
- Genres: R&B; soul
- Occupations: Singer; songwriter; arranger; record producer
- Instrument: Vocals
- Years active: 1950s–2005
- Formerly of: The Chi-Lites

Eugene Booker Record (December 23, 1940 – July 22, 2005) was an American singer, songwriter, arranger, and record producer. He was best known as the lead vocalist of the Chicago-based vocal group The Chi-Lites. He had international hits with "Oh Girl," "Have You Seen Her," "Soulful Strut," and "(For God's Sake) Give More Power to the People". His writing contributions earned him a Grammy Award.

== Biography ==
Born in Chicago, Illinois, United States, to Booker and Bernice Record, Record was drawn to music through his older sister's involvement as a pianist. He learned to play the guitar and formed his first group while at high school with Robert Lester, who stayed on when they joined up with two members of another local group to form The Hi-Lites and eventually changing the name to The Chi-Lites. After a few unsuccessful singles, the group was signed by Brunswick Records production chief in Chicago, Carl Davis.

Record wrote or co-wrote (often with singer Barbara Acklin) a long series of hits for the group, including million-sellers "Have You Seen Her" and "Oh Girl", as well as major hits, such as "Homely Girl" and "Give More Power To The People". He also wrote and produced for other artists, mostly on Brunswick, including Acklin, Jackie Wilson, The Lost Generation, Otis Leavill, and later, The Dells and The Impressions.

When Brunswick began to falter due to legal and financial issues in the mid-1970s, Record decided to go solo and released three albums (entitled The Eugene Record, Trying to Get to You, and Welcome to My Fantasy) in the late 1970s on Warner Music Group without major success, before re-joining The Chi-Lites in 1980. As well as returning to sing with the group, he teamed up again with Carl Davis, formerly his mentor at Brunswick, to produce and take on executive duties for Davis' Chi-Sound Records label.

Record stayed with The Chi-Lites until the mid-1980s for several albums on various labels before leaving again. Becoming a born-again Christian, he produced a gospel album on his own Evergreen label. He also continued to make occasional guest appearances with the group.

In 1978, he appeared on Saturday Night Live with Michael Palin. He performed "Have You Seen Her" and "Trying to Get to You". In 1979 he recorded his only track which ventured onto the disco scene called, "Magnetism". The record was released on 12" single and, despite being played regularly in local clubs, did not become a hit. His 1977 track entitled "Overdose of Joy" has had a resurgence of interest.

In 2003, he appeared as lead singer with the Chi-Lites singing "Have You Seen Her" live in Atlantic City during the PBS special, "70s Soul Superstars (My Music)".

== Personal life ==
Eugene Record was married twice. He first married his high school sweetheart, Sandra Scott, about whom the hit, "Have You Seen Her", was written. He later married his second wife, Jacqueline. Record has been erroneously reported to have married Barbara Acklin. They were never married.

He died on July 22, 2005, in Chicago, after a long battle with cancer. He was 64. He was buried at Resurrection Catholic Cemetery in Justice, Illinois, having come from Catholic family roots.

== Discography ==
Record had several hits after rejoining the Chi-Lites in the early 1980s. With Linda F. Williams, writing under the name L. F. Butler and L. Frances Butler had three releases by The Chi-Lites:

- "You Take the Cake" on the Changing For You album released by the Chi-Lites in 1982.
- "Do What You Want" on the Steppin' Out album released by the Chi-Lites in 1984, and
- "Hard Act to Follow," a single released by the Chi-Lites in the United Kingdom in 1985. This song was also recorded and released by Dutch artist, Nancy Boyd (aka: Nancy Bruinooge) in 1985 and again in 1992 on the You Can Always Count on Me album.

He is a co-writer of the 2003 Beyoncé hit record "Crazy in Love", thanks to its sampling of The Chi-Lites' "Are You My Woman (Tell Me So)". His writing contributions earned him a Grammy Award.
