= Brunswick Records =

US record label

- Founded: 1916; 110 years ago
- Founder: Brunswick-Balke-Collender Company
- Distributor: AMPED Distribution
- Genre: Various
- Country of origin: United States
- Official website: brunswickrecords.com

Brunswick Records is an American record label founded in 1916.

== History ==
=== 1916–1929 ===
Records under the Brunswick label were first produced by the Brunswick-Balke-Collender Company, a company based in Dubuque, Iowa which had been manufacturing products ranging from pianos to sporting equipment since 1845. The company first began producing phonographs in 1916, then began marketing their own line of records as an afterthought. These first Brunswick records used the vertical cut system like Edison Disc Records, and were not sold in large numbers. They were recorded in the United States but sold only in Canada.

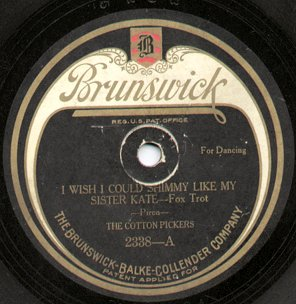
A Brunswick record label from 1922

In January 1920, a new line of Brunswick Records was introduced in the U.S. and Canada that employed the lateral cut system which was becoming the default cut for 78 discs. Brunswick started its standard popular series at 2000 and ended up in 1940 at 8517. However, when the series reached 4999, they skipped over the previous allocated 5000s and continued at 6000. When they reached 6999, they continued at 7301 (because the early 7000s had been previously allocated as their Race series). The parent company marketed them extensively, and within a few years Brunswick became a competitor to America's "big three" record companies, Edison Records, Victor, and Columbia Records.

The Brunswick line of home phonographs were commercially successful. Brunswick had a hit with their Ultona phonograph capable of playing Edison Disc Records, Pathé disc records, and standard lateral 78s. In late 1924, Brunswick acquired the Vocalion Records label.

Audio fidelity of early-1920s, acoustically-recorded Brunswick discs is above average for the era. They were pressed into good quality shellac, although not as durable as that used by Victor. General music director Walter B. Rogers and his colleague Gus Haenschen lured significant classical and popular soloists into Brunswick's roster, including Sigrid Onegin, Marie Tiffany, Michael Bohnen, Mario Chamlee, Richard Bonelli, Giacomo Lauri-Volpi, and popular singers Al Bernard, Ernest Hare, and light-voiced Nick Lucas. Significant Brunswick instrumentalists included pianists Leopold Godowsky and Josef Hofmann, and violinists Bronislaw Huberman and Max Rosen.

In the spring of 1925 Brunswick introduced its own version of electrical recording derived from the Pallophotophone system, developed by Charles A. Hoxie (and licensed from General Electric) using photoelectric cells, which Brunswick called the "Light-Ray" process. These early electric discs have a harsh equalization which does not compare well to early electric Columbias and Victors, and the company's logbooks from 1925–27 show many recordings that were unissued for technical reasons having to do with the GE system's electronic and sonic inconsistencies. (Only Brunswick and Vocalion records pressed at their West Coast plant bore the name "Light-Ray Process" on the labels.)

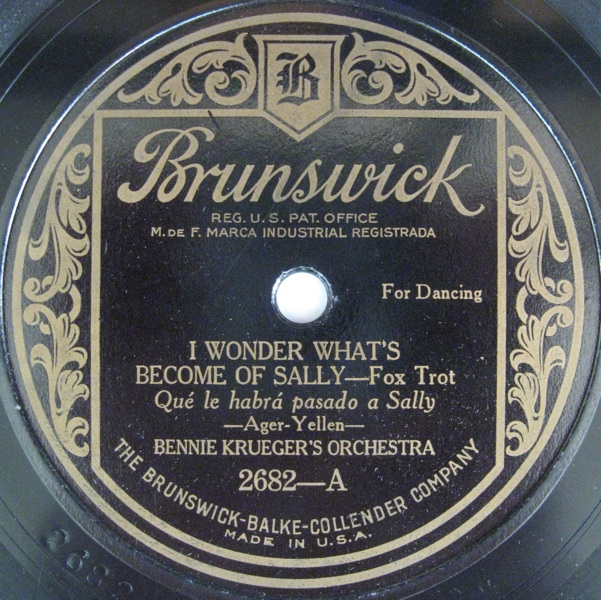
A Brunswick record label from the mid-1920s

Once Brunswick's engineers had tentative control of their new equipment, the company expanded its popular music recording activities, exploiting its roster of stars: the dance bands of Bob Haring, Isham Jones, Ben Bernie, Abe Lyman, Earl Burtnett, and banjoist Harry Reser and his various ensembles (especially the Six Jumping Jacks), and Al Jolson (whose record labels proclaimed him "The World's Greatest Entertainer With Orchestra").

Then based in Chicago (although they maintained an office and studio in New York), many of the city's best orchestras and performers recorded for Brunswick. The label's jazz roster included Fletcher Henderson, Duke Ellington (usually as the Jungle Band), King Oliver, Johnny Dodds, Andy Kirk, Roger Wolfe Kahn, and Red Nichols. Brunswick initiated a 7000 race series (with the distinctive 'lightning bolt' label design, also used for their popular 100 hillbilly series) as well as the Vocalion 1000 race series. These race records series recorded hot jazz, urban and rural blues, and gospel. Brunswick also had a very successful business supplying radio with sponsored transcriptions of popular music, comedy and personalities.

In the early 1920s Brunswick also embarked on an ambitious domestic classical instrumental recording program which carried over into the electrical era, recording violinist Bronislaw Huberman, pianists Josef Hofmann and Leopold Godowsky (both of whom made the majority of their American recordings for Brunswick), and the New York String Quartet. They moved into orchestral recording in 1922 with the renowned "Capitol Grand Orchestra" under Erno Rapee from the Capitol Theatre in New York (at a time when Eugene Ormandy was the orchestra's concertmaster), then contracting with the Minneapolis Symphony under Henri Verbrugghen and the Cleveland Orchestra under Nikolai Sokoloff in 1924, the orchestra of the Metropolitan Opera House (39th Street) under Gennaro Papi, and in a tremendous steal from Victor, they put the New York Philharmonic with conductors Willem Mengelberg and Arturo Toscanini on their artists roster - but only briefly. The popular records, which used small performing groups, were difficult enough to make with the photoelectric cell process; symphony orchestra recording, however, further exacerbated the problems of the "Light-Ray" system. Few orchestral records were approved for issue and those that did appear on the market often combined excellent performances with execrable sound, which particularly displeased Toscanini (only two sides he conducted were ever released). Brunswick found it expedient and ultimately cheaper to contract with European companies (whose electrical recording systems surpassed Brunswick's). Among the recordings Brunswick imported and issued under their own label (through an agreement reached with Polydor, Deutsche Grammophon's export branch) were historic performances conducted by Hans Pfitzner and Richard Strauss—the latter conducting critically acclaimed performances of his symphonic poems Don Juan and Till Eulenspiegel's Merry Pranks, recorded in Berlin in 1929–30. Some of these recordings have been reissued on CD.

Brunswick itself switched to a conventional condenser microphone recording process (licensed through Western Electric) in 1927, with better results. Prior to this, however, they had introduced the Brunswick Panatrope all-electric phonograph with electric amplification. This phonograph met with critical acclaim, and composer Ottorino Respighi selected the Brunswick Panatrope to play a recording of bird songs in his composition The Pines of Rome. Jack Kapp became the record company executive of Brunswick in 1930.

=== 1930–1944 ===
In April 1930, Brunswick-Balke-Collender sold Brunswick Records to Warner Bros. Pictures, Inc., and the company's headquarters moved to New York. Warner Bros. hoped to make their own soundtrack recordings for their sound-on-disc Vitaphone system. A number of interesting recordings were made by actors during this period, featuring songs from musical films. Actors who made recordings included Noah Beery, Charles King, and J. Harold Murray. During this Warner Bros. period Brunswick signed Bing Crosby, who was to become their biggest recording star, as well as the Mills Brothers, Adelaide Hall, the Boswell Sisters, Cab Calloway, the Casa Loma Orchestra and Ozzie Nelson.

In November 1930, the new budget-line, Melotone, debuted, entering a field of lower-priced electrical records, including Columbia's Clarion, Velvet Tone, Harmony and the labels of the Plaza Music Company, such as Perfect, Banner, and Romeo. Melotone releases before the ARC takeover of December 1931 are not duplicated on these labels. When Vitaphone was abandoned in favor of sound-on-film systems—and record industry sales plummeted due to the Great Depression—Warner Bros. leased the Brunswick record operation to Consolidated Film Industries, the parent company of the American Record Corporation (ARC), in December 1931. In 1932, the UK branch of Brunswick was acquired by British Decca.

Between early 1932 and 1939, Brunswick was ARC's flagship label, selling for 75 cents, while all of the other ARC labels were selling for 35 cents. Best selling artists during that time were Bing Crosby, the Boswell Sisters, the Mills Brothers, Duke Ellington, Cab Calloway, Abe Lyman, Casa Loma Orchestra, Leo Reisman, Ben Bernie, Red Norvo, Teddy Wilson, and Anson Weeks. Many of these artists moved over to Decca in late 1934, causing Brunswick to reissue popular records by these artists on the ARC dime store labels as a means to compete with Decca's 35 cent price. In 1939, the American Record Corp. was bought by the Columbia Broadcasting System for $750,000, which discontinued the Brunswick label in 1940, in favor of reviving the Columbia label (as well as reviving the OKeh label, replacing Vocalion). This, along with the lower than agreed-upon sales/production numbers, violated the Warner lease agreement, resulting in the Brunswick trademark reverting to Warner. In 1941, Warner sold the Brunswick and Vocalion labels to American Decca (which Warner had a financial interest in), with all masters recorded prior to December 1931. Rights to recordings from late December 1931 on were retained by CBS/Columbia.

In 1943, Decca revived the Brunswick label, mostly for reissues of recordings from earlier decades, particularly Bing Crosby's early hits of 1931 and jazz items from the 1920s. Since then, Decca and its successors have had ownership of the historic Brunswick Records archive from this time period.

=== 1945–1956 ===
After World War II, American Decca releases were issued in the United Kingdom on the Brunswick label until 1968 when the MCA Records label was introduced in the UK. During the war, British Decca sold its American branch. By 1952, Brunswick was put under the management of Decca's Coral Records subsidiary. That same year, Brunswick resumed releasing new material, initially as rhythm and blues specialty label, adding pop music in 1957. Later in the 1950s, American Decca made Brunswick its leading rock and roll label, featuring artists such as Buddy Holly & the Crickets, with releases having backup vocals (by The Picks or The Roses) and labeled under the group name without reference to Holly. Hit records by Buddy Holly were released during the same period of his career on the co-owned Coral Records. The records released on Coral by Holly normally were without backup vocals, with the exception of "Rave On" and "Early In The Morning". In 1957, Brunswick became a subsidiary label to Coral. A pre-Four Seasons Nick Massi made his recording debut for Brunswick in 1959.

=== 1957–1979/R&B ===
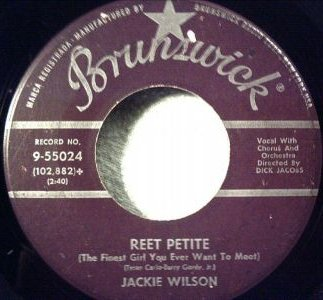
Jackie Wilson's debut single was the first release of the current Brunswick Records.

Starting in the latter part of the 1950s and continuing well into the 1970s, the label recorded mainly R&B/soul acts, such as the label's leading artist in the late 1950s and early/mid 1960s, Jackie Wilson, and later on, the Chi-Lites. Jackie Wilson's manager, Nat Tarnopol, joined the label in 1957 as head of A&R. Brunswick became a separate company and a unit of Decca in 1960 with Tarnopol serving as executive vice-president. He acquired a 50% interest in Brunswick from Decca in 1964 and then the rest of Brunswick from Decca in 1969 to settle disputes with Decca management. Nat Tarnopol worked with R&B singer Jackie Wilson.

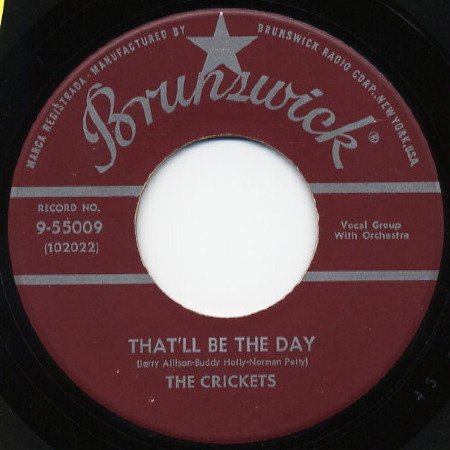
During the 1950s, the artists on Brunswick and Coral were interchangeable. This single by Buddy Holly and the Crickets, who were signed to Coral, was released on Brunswick.

Many of the recordings which established Brunswick as a major force in R&B and soul music in the mid-1960s and into the 1970s were supervised by producer Carl Davis in Chicago. He joined the label after helping to revive Jackie Wilson's recording career with his production on Wilson's 1966 hit, "Whispers". Wilson and Davis collaborated the following year for one of the label's biggest selling singles, "Higher And Higher", which sold over two million copies (No. 1 R&B, No. 5 pop). The Chi-Lites recorded two No. 1 R&B hits in the 1970s for Brunswick, "Have You Seen Her" and "Oh Girl", both co-written and co-produced by lead singer, Eugene Record. "Oh Girl" also topped the Billboard Hot 100. Davis formed a sister label, Dakar Records, in 1969, with Tyrone Davis (no relation) becoming its main artist and a major-selling R&B act. Dakar was first distributed by Atlantic Records for two years, but moved under Brunswick distribution from January 1972, after the company became independent from Decca.

Brunswick and Dakar artists included the Chi-Lites, Hamilton Bohannon, Tyrone Davis, Jackie Wilson, Barbara Acklin, Young-Holt Unlimited, Gene Chandler, the Artistics, Otis Leavill, the Lost Generation, Walter Jackson, Erma Franklin, Willie Henderson & the Soul, Maryann Farra & Satin soul, Strutt, Touch, Sunny Nash and Little Richard. Main producers for the labels, along with Davis, were Eugene Record, Willie Henderson and later, Leo Graham, while staff arrangers during the Chicago years included Sonny Sanders, Tony Moulton Quinton Joseph and Willie Henderson.

The Chi-Lites' "Oh Girl" was the label's only release from post-1957 to reach the top of the Billboard Hot 100, but Brunswick and Dakar managed to top the R&B chart a total of 10 times during the same period, six by Jackie Wilson and two each by Tyrone Davis and the Chi-Lites.

Legal problems caused Brunswick to become dormant after 1982, in which Tarnopol licensed Brunswick recordings from 1957 onwards to the special products unit of Columbia Records. Brunswick had its last chart hits in 1982. Although Brunswick was eventually cleared of the charges, the situation, which had resulted in court action, left both the label and Tarnopol in financial difficulties. By then, Carl Davis and most of the artists had left the company. Tarnopol blamed his legal problems on a personal vendetta led by Lew Wasserman, the head of Decca's parent corporation, MCA Inc. Tarnopol died in 1987 at age 56.

== Ownership ==
The Tarnopol family only claims ownership of Brunswick recordings since Tarnopol joined Brunswick in 1957. Decca's parent company, Universal Music controls the Decca-era pre-Tarnopol Brunswick recordings (excluding the late 1931–1939 era, which is still controlled by Columbia Records' parent, Sony Music Entertainment). The Decca-era Brunswick jazz catalogue is managed by the Verve Music Group (which is also part of Universal).

The official Brunswick Records web site has a detailed history of the Tarnopol-era Brunswick Records. The label was revived in 1995 by Nat's children. and many of the Chicago soul recordings have been re-issued in recent years. Brunswick's catalog is distributed by Spy Music Group.

== See also ==
- Lists of record labels
