= José Feliciano discography =

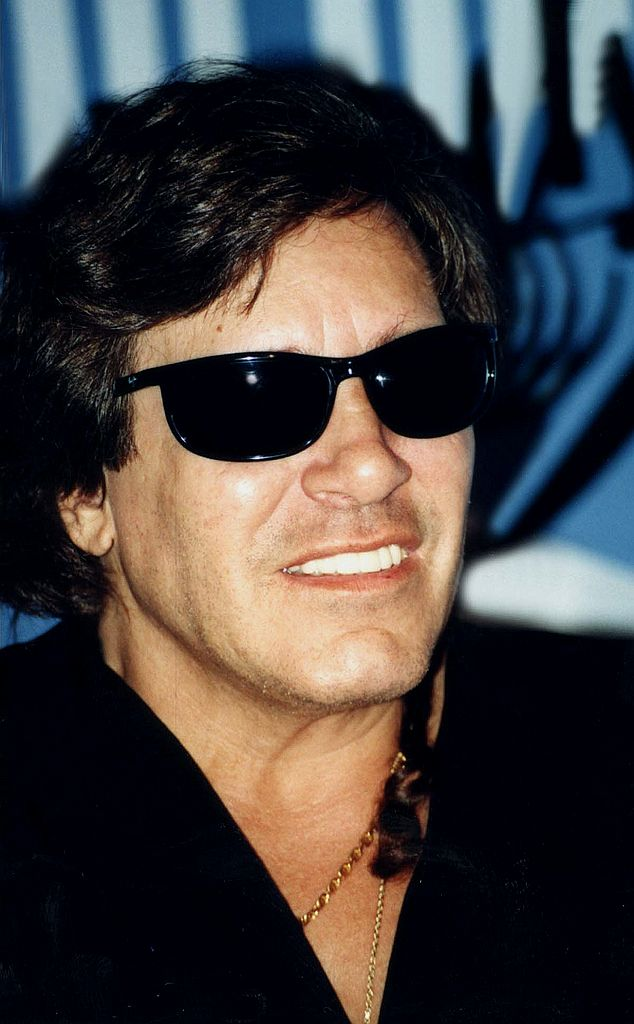
- Feliciano in 1999
- Studio albums: 55
- Live albums: 7
- Compilation albums: 12
- Tribute albums: 1
- Singles: 58
- Video albums: 4

José Feliciano has recorded 56 studio albums, most of which are primarily sung in either English or Spanish. Three of his releases (Feliciano!, Feliciano/10 to 23, and Alive Alive O!) received the standard Gold certification from the Recording Industry Association of America for sales of 500,000 units. Two of his other albums were awarded Los Premios de Oro y De Platino from the RIAA: Señor Bolero went double Platinum in 2004 for surpassing sales of 120,000 units, and José Feliciano y Amigos went Gold in 2008 after selling 30,000 copies.

Feliciano has also enjoyed more than 50 years of hit singles in countries around the world. Although his biggest English-language hit, "Light My Fire", reached the top ten on the pop charts in the US, Canada, and the UK, it is his Christmas song "Feliz Navidad" that has returned to the charts in several countries every holiday season for much of the new millennium.

== Albums ==
=== Studio albums ===
Year	Album	Chart positions							
Year	Album	US	US R&B	US Latin Pop	US Latin	AUS	CAN	NL	UK
1965	The Voice and Guitar of José Feliciano	—	—	—	—	—	—	—	—
1966	A Bag Full of Soul	—	—	—	—	—	—	—	—
1966	Fantastic Feliciano	—	—	—	—	—	—	—	—
1966	El Sentimiento	—	—	—	—	—	—	—	—
1966	La Copa Rota	—	—	—	—	—	—	—	—
1967	Sombra, Una Guitarra y Boleros	—	—	—	—	—	—	—	—
1967	El Fantastico!	—	—	—	—	—	—	—	—
1968	Feliciano!	2	3	—	—	2	1	—	6
1968	Sin Luz	—	—	—	—	—	—	—	—
1968	Souled	24	4	—	—	6	5	—	—
1969	Feliciano/10 to 23	16	15	—	—	2	8	8	38
1970	Fireworks	57	—	—	—	11	32	—	65
1970	José Feliciano (Feliz Navidad) (Note: For chart entries after 1970, see Christmas album chart entries section)	34	—	—	—	—	30	—	—
1971	En Mi Soledad - No Llores Más	—	—	—	—	—	—	—	—
1971	That the Spirit Needs	173	—	—	—	—	—	—	—
1972	Dos Cruces/El Jinete	—	—	—	—	—	—	—	—
1972	Memphis Menu	—	—	—	—	—	—	—	—
1973	Compartments	156	—	—	—	—	—	—	—
1974	And the Feeling's Good	136	—	—	—	—	—	—	—
1974	For My Love... Mother Music	—	—	—	—	—	—	—	—
1975	Affirmation	—	—	—	—	—	—	—	—
1975	Just Wanna Rock 'n' Roll	165	—	—	—	—	—	—	—
1976	Angela (Aaron Loves Angela soundtrack)	—	—	—	—	—	—	—	—
1976	Sweet Soul Music	—	—	—	—	—	—	—	—
1981	José Feliciano	—	61	—	—	—	—	—	—
1982	Escenas de Amor	—	—	—	—	—	—	—	—
1983	Romance in the Night	—	—	—	—	—	—	—	—
1983	Me Enamoré	—	—	—	—	—	—	—	—
1984	Como Tú Quieres	—	—	9	—	—	—	—	—
1985	Ya Soy Tuyo	—	—	2	—	—	—	—	—
1986	Te Amaré	—	—	3	—	—	—	—	—
1987	Tu Inmenso Amor	—	—	4	—	—	—	—	—
1989	I'm Never Gonna Change	—	—	—	—	—	—	—	—
1990	Niña	—	—	3	—	—	—	—	—
1990	Steppin' Out	—	—	—	—	—	—	—	—
1992	Latin Street '92	—	—	—	—	—	—	—	—
1996	Americano	—	—	—	—	—	—	—	—
1997	On Second Thought	—	—	—	—	—	—	—	—
1997	Present Tense	—	—	—	—	—	—	—	—
1998	Señor Bolero	—	—	8	20	—	—	—	—
2000	Guitarra Mia: Un Tributo a José Feliciano	—	—	—	42	—	—	—	—
2003	Señor Bolero Vol. 2	173	—	1	2	—	—	—	—
2004	A México... Con Amor	—	—	13	54	—	—	—	—
2006	Six-String Lady	—	—	—	—	—	—	—	—
2007	The Genius of José Feliciano	—	—	—	—	—	—	—	—
2007	José Feliciano y Amigos	—	—	13	33	—	—	—	—
2007	Señor Bachata	—	—	—	40	—	—	—	—
2007	The Soundtrax of My Life	—	—	—	—	—	—	—	—
2008	Con México en el Corazón	—	—	—	69	—	—	—	—
2009	American Classics (digital download only)	—	—	—	—	—	—	—	—
2009	Djangoisms	—	—	—	—	—	—	—	—
2011	The Genius of José Feliciano, Vol. 2	—	—	—	—	—	—	—	—
2012	The King... by José Feliciano	—	—	—	—	—	—	—	—
2017	As You See Me Now (with Jools Holland)	—	—	—	—	—	—	—	24
2017	Mozart Castrato Arias (with Arno Raunig)	—	—	—	—	—	—	—	—
2020	Behind This Guitar	—	—	—	—	—	—	—	—

=== Live albums ===
Year	Album	Chart positions				
Year	Album	US	AUS	CAN	NL	UK
1969	Alive Alive-O!	29	3	19	1	23
1973	José Feliciano in Concert with the London Symphony Orchestra	—	—	—	—	—
1999	A Legend in Concert: A PBS Special Event	—	—	—	—	—
2006	Live at the Blue Note in New York	—	—	—	—	—
2009	José Feliciano en Vivo	—	—	—	—	—
2016	Live at the Iridium – Happy Birthday, Les! (with the Les Paul Trio)	—	—	—	—	—
2019	Live 1967	—	—	—	—	—

=== Compilation albums ===
Year	Album	Chart positions				
Year	Album	US	US Latin Pop	US Latin	CAN	NL
1967	Mas Éxitos de José Feliciano	—	—	—	—	—
1971	Ché Sarà	—	—	—	—	25
1971	Encore! José Feliciano's Finest Performances	92	—	—	55	—
1971	Felicidades con lo Mejor de José Feliciano	—	—	—	—	—
1971	January '71	—	—	—	—	—
1971	José Feliciano Canta Otra Vez	—	—	—	—	—
1973	José Feliciano Sings	—	—	—	—	—
1985	Portrait: The Best of José Feliciano	—	—	—	—	37
1989	Los 15 Especiales de José Feliciano	—	7	—	—	—
2001	Noches de Bohemia	—	—	35	—	—
2001	Noches de Bohemia Vol. 2	—	—	47	—	—
2006	La Historia de José Feliciano	—	9	33	—	—
2020	The Definite Best	—	—	—	—	47

=== Christmas album chart entries: 1973–present ===
In 1970, Feliciano released a self-titled album of Christmas songs, one of which was "Feliz Navidad". The album spent four weeks on Billboard's Christmas Albums chart in December 1973 and did not chart again in the US under that title. When it was reissued in 2001, it was retitled Feliz Navidad and began appearing on the magazine's album charts during the 2017 Christmas season.

==== José Feliciano ====
Chart (1973)	Peak position
US Billboard Christmas Albums	3

==== Feliz Navidad ====
Chart (2017)	Peak position
US Billboard Holiday Albums	41

Chart (2018)	Peak position
US Billboard Holiday Albums	25
US Billboard 200	84

Chart (2020)	Peak position
US Billboard Holiday Albums	21
US Billboard 200	54

== Video releases ==
- Purely Music: Live in Germany 1988 (1988, LaserDisc)
- A Legend in Concert: A PBS Special Event (1999, VHS)
- Guitarra Mia: Un Tributo a José Feliciano (2000, VHS)
- Ayer, Hoy y Siempre (2003, DVD)
- New Morning: The Paris Concert by the José Feliciano Band (2009, DVD)
- José Feliciano en Vivo: Puerto Rico (2009, DVD)
- José Felicano: Behind The Mask YouTube video release by director Tom Laurie

== Singles ==
=== 1960s ===
Year	Single	Chart positions								
Year	Single	US	US R&B	US AC	AUS	AUT	CAN	CAN AC	NL	UK
1966	"Usted"	—	—	—	—	—	—	—	—	—
1966	"Extraños en la Noche"	—	—	—	—	—	—	—	—	—
1967	"La Carcel de Sing Sing"	—	—	—	—	—	—	—	—	—
1967	"Amor Gitano"	—	—	—	—	—	—	—	—	—
1967	"Celoso"	—	—	—	—	—	—	—	—	—
1967	"Camino Verde"	—	—	—	—	—	—	—	—	—
1968	"La Copa Rota"	—	—	—	—	—	—	—	—	—
1968	"Light My Fire"	3	29	—	15	—	1	—	24	6
1968	"Hi-Heel Sneakers" "Hitchcock Railway"	25; 77	44 —	31 —	20	— —	9 —	— —	— —	— —
1968	"The Star Spangled Banner"	50	—	—	—	—	—	—	—	—
1968	"And the Sun Will Shine"	—	—	—	—	—	—	—	—	25
1969	"Adios Amor (Goodbye My Love)"	—	—	—	4	—	—	—	—	51
1969	"Hey! Baby!" "My World Is Empty Without You"	71; 87	— —	— —	71	— —	20 —	— —	— —	— —
1969	"No Dogs Allowed"	—	—	—	—	—	—	—	6	—
1969	"Marley Purt Drive"	70	—	33	31	—	48	26	—	—
1969	"Old Turkey Buzzard (Mackenna's Gold)"	—	—	—	—	—	—	—	—	—
1969	"Rain" "She's a Woman"	76; 103	— —	19 —	36	7 —	57; 88	21 —	— —	— —
1969	"The Windmills of Your Mind"	—	—	—	—	—	—	—	13	—

=== 1970s ===
Year	Single	Chart positions										
Year	Single	US	US AC	AUS	AUT	CAN	CAN AC	GER	NL	SPA	SWE	UK
1970	"Point of View"	—	—	58	—	90	—	—	—	—	—	—
1970	"Younger Generation" "Girl (You'll Never Get Away from Me)"	— —	— —	93	— —	— —	— —	— —	— —	— —	— —	— —
1970	"Once There Was a Love"	—	—	—	—	—	—	—	—	—	—	—
1970	"Destiny" "Suzie Q"	83; 84	15 —	37	13 —	77 —	— —	— —	— —	— 14	— —	— —
1970	"Feliz Navidad" (Note: For chart entries after 2000, see "Feliz Navidad" chart entries section)	—	—	99	—	—	—	—	—	8	1	—
1971	"Che Sarà / Que Sera / Shake a Hand"	—	—	—	2	—	—	7	2	1	1	—
1971	"I Only Want to Say (Gethsemane)"	122	—	—	—	—	—	—	—	—	—	—
1971	"Dos Cruces – El Jinete"	—	—	—	—	—	—	—	—	3	—	—
1971	"Cenizas"	—	—	—	—	—	—	—	—	—	—	—
1972	"Come Down Jesus – Only Once"	—	—	—	—	—	—	—	—	—	9	—
1972	"Una Favola Blu"	—	—	—	—	—	—	—	—	—	—	—
1973	"Tale of Maria"	—	—	—	—	—	—	—	—	—	2	—
1975	"Twilight Time"	—	45	—	—	—	30	—	—	—	—	—
1975	"Chico and the Man"	96	—	—	—	—	—	—	—	—	—	—

=== 1980s ===
Year	Single	Chart positions							
Year	Single	US R&B	US AC	US Latin	US Country	AUT	GER	NL	SPA
1980	"I'm Comin' Home Again"	—	44	—	—	—	—	—	—
1982	"I Wanna Be Where You Are"	63	—	—	—	—	—	—	—
1982	"Everybody Loves Me"	—	—	—	—	—	—	—	—
1982	"Para Decir Adios"	—	—	—	—	—	—	—	—
1982	"Samba Pa Ti"	—	—	—	—	8	—	—	10
1983	"Let's Find Each Other Tonight"	—	—	—	64	—	—	—	25
1983	"Ay Cariño"	—	—	—	—	—	—	—	11
1987	"Se Me Sigue Olvidando"	—	—	6	—	—	—	—	—
1987	"Te Amaré"	—	—	4	—	—	—	—	—
1987	"Por Eso"	—	—	34	—	—	—	—	—
1988	"Ponte a Cantar"	—	—	5	—	—	—	13	—
1988	"No Hay Mal Que Por Bien No Venga"	—	—	3	—	—	—	—	—
1988	"Cuando el Amor Se Acaba"	—	—	7	—	—	—	—	—
1988	"No Te Arrepentiras"	—	—	33	—	—	—	—	—
1988	"The Sound of Vienna" (with Vienna Project)	—	—	—	—	1	62	—	—
1989	"Never Gonna Change"	—	—	—	—	—	71	—	—

=== 1990s–present ===
Year	Single	Chart positions				
Year	Single	US	US AC	US Dance	US Latin	AUT
1990	"¿Por Qué Te Tengo Que Olvidar?"	—	—	—	1	—
1990	"Insieme Fairplay" (with Etta Scollo)	—	—	—	—	30
1991	"No Puedo Estar Sin Ti"	—	—	—	10	—
1993	"Venga La Esperanza"	—	—	—	24	—
1994	"Soy Alegre"	—	—	—	31	—
1994	"Goin' Krazy" (released under pseudonym "JF")	—	—	38	—	—
1998	"Me Has Echado Al Olvido"	—	—	—	6	—
1998	"Feliz Navidad" (re-release)	70	18	—	—	—
1999	"Que Tristeza"	—	—	—	39	—
2000	"Feliz Navidad" / "Um Feliz nadal" (re-entry)	105	12	—	29	—
2003	"Lo Que Yo Tuve Contigo"	—	—	—	13	—
2004	"Cien Años"	—	—	—	38	—

=== "Feliz Navidad" chart entries: 2007–present ===
Particularly since 2007, "Feliz Navidad" has repeatedly charted year after year during the Christmas season. The years below refer to the Christmas seasons in which the record has charted; in some cases, the weekly chart on which "Feliz Navidad" peaked has borne a January date.

Year	Chart positions									
Year	US	US Holiday 100	AUT	CAN	GER	NL	SPA	SWE	SWI	UK
2007	—	—	—	—	86	—	—	54	89	—
2008	—	—	—	—	42	—	—	—	51	—
2009	—	—	37	—	54	—	—	—	56	—
2010	—	—	56	—	42	—	—	—	62	—
2011	—	3	47	—	48	—	—	—	61	—
2012	—	4	45	—	57	—	—	34	68	—
2013	—	6	57	—	56	65	—	—	64	—
2014	—	6	51	—	49	89	—	22	52	—
2015	—	8	59	—	45	44	66	32	60	—
2016	44	5	31	—	37	30	—	24	21	78
2017	49	7	27	—	24	50	—	17	23	86
2018	29	10	17	26	19	29	73	17	10	77
2019	12	7	11	10	15	16	66	7	4	54
2020	6	5	15	10	16	12	37	5	8	40
2021	8	6	8	12	11	10	77	5	7	25
2022	7	7	6	9	7	7	35	5	6	21
2023	8	7	6	8	11	8	23	4	7	23
2024	11	8	5	9	5	9	26	7	6	17
2025	11	11	5	9	7	10	—	—	9	18
2026	—	—	15	—	45	—	—	—	—	—

"Feliz Navidad" was certified Platinum in Australia by ARIA in 2022.

== Bibliography ==
- Roberts, David (2006), British Hit Singles & Albums (19th ed.), London: Guinness World Records Limited, ISBN 1-904994-10-5
- Whitburn, Joel (2004a), Christmas in the Charts (1920-2004), Record Research Inc., ISBN 0-89820-161-6
- Whitburn, Joel (2004b), Joel Whitburn's Hot Dance/Disco, 1974-2003, Menomonee Falls, Wisconsin: Record Research Inc., ISBN 089820156X
- Whitburn, Joel (2007). Joel Whitburn Presents Billboard Top Adult Songs, 1961–2006 Chart Data Compiled from Billboard's Adult Contemporary Charts, 1961–2006, and Adult Top 40 Charts, 1996–2006. Menomonee Falls, Wisconsin: Record Research Inc. ISBN 978-0-898-20169-7.
- Whitburn, Joel (2009), Joel Whitburn's Top Pop Singles (12th ed.), Menomonee Falls, Wisconsin: Record Research Inc., ISBN 978-0898201802
