= Affirmation (José Feliciano song) =

1975 single by José Feliciano

"Affirmation" is a composition by José Feliciano, written in 1975 and first released on his album Just Wanna Rock 'n' Roll the same year. It was made popular by jazz guitarist George Benson on his 1976 album Breezin'. It was one of Benson's greatest hits and it is regarded as a jazz standard.

Japanese DJ and composer Nujabes sampled Jose Feliciano's rendition of Affirmation for the instrumental track, Counting Stars, which appears on the compilation album, Hydeout Productions 2nd Collection.
