= Were You There =

American spiritual, first printed in 1899

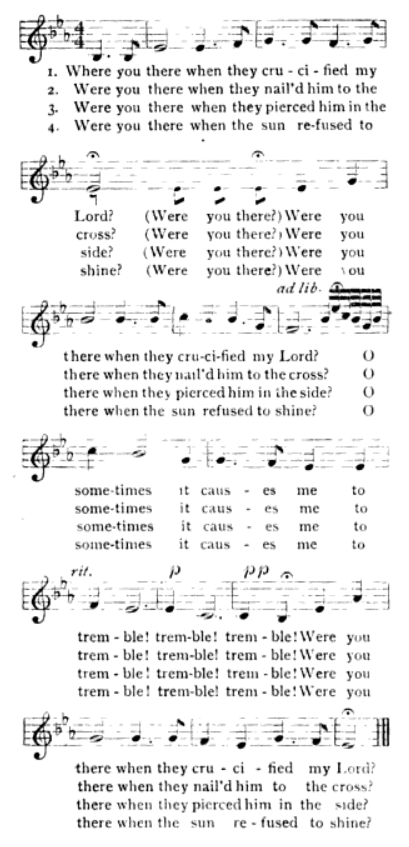
Sheet music for Were You There

"Were You There (When They Crucified My Lord)" is an African-American spiritual that was first printed in 1899. It was likely composed by enslaved African Americans in the 19th century.

There are some of the more recent plantation hymns which have added an element of culture without diminishing religious fervor. One of the best of these is "Were You There When They Crucified My Lord?" It dwells on the details of the crucifixion, and the separate stanzas add only a single line each to the song. It is a tender and beautiful hymn, the climax of its effect depending largely on the hold and slur on the exclamation "Oh!" with which the third line begins, and the repetition and expression of the word "tremble! tremble! tremble!"

— William Eleazar Barton, Old Plantation Hymns (1899)

The song was first published in William Eleazar Barton's 1899 Old Plantation Hymns but was described in writings prior to this publication. In 1940, it was included in the Episcopal Church hymnal, making it the first spiritual to be included in any major American hymnal. It is also unique in that it is the only African-American song included in the Catholic Church's Liturgy of the Hours.

As reported in Howard Thurman's autobiography, the song was one of Mahatma Gandhi's favorites. The song has been recorded by artists including Paul Robeson, Marion Williams, Marian Anderson, Johnny Cash, Roy Acuff, Phil Keaggy, Max Roach, Diamanda Galás, Harry Belafonte, The Seldom Scene, Diamond Version (with Neil Tennant), Bayard Rustin, Rajaton, Millennial Choirs and Orchestras, and Chris Rice. A writer from the Indianapolis News wrote about Paul Robeson's rendition, saying that "It was as startling and vivid a disclosure of reverent feeling of penetrating pathos as one could imagine."

== Lyrics ==
The following lyrics are those printed in the 1899 Old Plantation Hymns; other variations exist.

Were you there when they crucified my Lord? (Were you there?)
Were you there when they crucified my Lord?
O sometimes it causes me to tremble! tremble! tremble!
Were you there when they crucified my Lord?

Were you there when they nail'd him to the cross? (Were you there?)
Were you there when they nail'd him to the cross?
O sometimes it causes me to tremble! tremble! tremble!
Were you there when they nail'd him to the cross?

Were you there when they pierced him in the side? (Were you there?)
Were you there when they pierced him in the side?
O sometimes it causes me to tremble! tremble! tremble!
Were you there when they pierced him in the side?

Were you there when the sun refused to shine? (Were you there?)
Were you there when the sun refused to shine?
O sometimes it causes me to tremble! tremble! tremble!
Were you there when the sun refused to shine?
