= Feliz Navidad (song) =

1970 single by José Feliciano

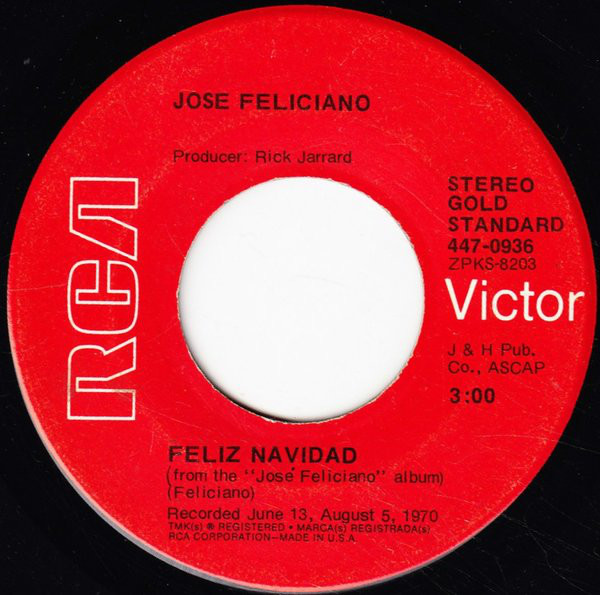

Single by José Feliciano

from the album Feliz Navidad
- Language: Spanish; English
- B-side: "The Little Drummer Boy"
- Released: November 9, 1970
- Recorded: June 13, 1970; August 5, 1970
- Genre: Latin pop; Christmas; aguinaldo
- Length: 3:00
- Label: RCA Victor
- Songwriter: José Feliciano
- Producer: Rick Jarrard

José Feliciano singles chronology
"Destiny" (1970)	"Feliz Navidad" (1970)	"Che Sarà" (1971)

Audio sample
- file; help

"Feliz Navidad" (Spanish: [feˈlis naβiˈða(ð)]; lit. transl. "Merry Christmas") is a Christmas song written and first recorded in 1970 by Puerto Rican singer-songwriter José Feliciano. With its simple, heartfelt lyrics—the traditional Spanish Christmas/New Year greeting "Feliz Navidad, próspero año y felicidad" ("Merry Christmas, a prosperous year and happiness"), followed by text in English words "I wanna wish you a merry Christmas from the bottom of my heart"—, it has become a Christmas classic and has gained popularity around the world.

In 2010, Feliciano's original recording was inducted into the Grammy Hall of Fame. In 2026, "Feliz Navidad" was selected by the Library of Congress for preservation in the National Recording Registry for its "cultural, historical or aesthetic importance in the nation's recorded sound heritage."

== Background and composition ==
Feliciano wrote "Feliz Navidad" while feeling homesick at Christmas, missing his family in New York City and his extended family further afield as he sat in a studio in Los Angeles. He remembered celebrating Christmas Eve with his brothers, eating traditional Puerto Rican foods, drinking rum, and going caroling. "It was expressing the joy that I felt on Christmas and the fact that I felt very lonely", he told NPR in December 2020. "I missed my family, I missed Christmas carols with them. I missed the whole Christmas scene."

The song was recorded in 10 minutes at RCA Studios on Sunset Boulevard with producer, Rick Jarrard. "That's why it's the simplest song ever written. 19 words to it", Feliciano told The New Yorker. "I wanted a song that belonged to the masses. If you know where your song is going to go, you don't have to fuck around with it too much. I used to say to myself, 'Joke 'em if they can't take a fuck!'"

== Chart performance ==
Feliciano's 1970 recording of "Feliz Navidad" (in which he plays both an acoustic guitar and a Puerto Rican cuatro) is one of the most downloaded and aired Christmas songs in the United States and Canada. As of November 25, 2016, total sales of the digital track stand at 808,000 downloads according to Nielsen SoundScan, placing it eighth on the list of all-time best-selling Christmas/holiday digital singles in SoundScan history. It was also recognized by ASCAP as one of the top 25 most played and recorded Christmas songs around the world.

The original version of "Feliz Navidad" did not enter any of the US Billboard music popularity charts until well over two-and-a-half decades after it was recorded, first on the Adult Contemporary chart on the week ending January 3, 1998 (reaching No. 18), and then on the Radio Songs chart the following week (reaching No. 70). Two years later, on the week ending January 8, 2000, the song re-entered the Billboard Adult Contemporary chart at a new peak of No. 12.

Nearly two decades later, "Feliz Navidad" entered the main Billboard Hot 100 songs chart for the first time, specifically on the week ending January 7, 2017, at No. 44. On the week ending December 22, 2018, the song re-charted on the Hot 100 at No. 42, and the following week became Feliciano's first top 40 hit since 1968 by climbing to No. 34. Two years later, and just two weeks after re-entering the Hot 100 chart at No. 45 on the week ending December 5, 2020, "Feliz Navidad" made the top 10 for the first time (at No. 10), becoming Feliciano's first top 10 hit on the Hot 100 chart since his cover of The Doors' "Light My Fire" peaked at No. 3 in August 1968. Two weeks later, "Feliz Navidad" climbed to an all-time chart peak position of No. 6 on the Hot 100.

In the United Kingdom, "Feliz Navidad" did not enter the UK Singles Chart until 2016, when it debuted at number 78. In 2020, the song made its UK top 40 debut, before reaching a peak of number 17 in 2024.

== Versions made after original ==
In 2017, Feliciano released a ska version of "Feliz Navidad" in collaboration with English musician Jools Holland.

== Charts ==
=== Weekly charts ===
Chart performance for "Feliz Navidad"
Chart (1970–2026)	Peak position
Australia (ARIA)	19
Austria (Ö3 Austria Top 40)	5
Belgium (Ultratop 50 Flanders)	9
Belgium (Ultratop 50 Wallonia)	20
Brazil Hot 100 Airplay (Billboard Brasil)	102
Canada Hot 100 (Billboard)	8
CIS Airplay (TopHit)	90
Croatia (Billboard)	18
Czech Republic Singles Digital (ČNS IFPI)	34
Denmark (Tracklisten)	26
Estonia Airplay (TopHit)	16
Finland (Suomen virallinen lista)	7
France (SNEP)	24
Germany (GfK)	5
Global 200 (Billboard)	5
Greece International Streaming (IFPI)	11
Hungary (Single Top 40)	13
Hungary (Stream Top 40)	11
Ireland (IRMA)	11
Italy (FIMI)	2
Latvia Streaming (LaIPA)	10
Lithuania (AGATA)	11
Luxembourg (Billboard)	8
Netherlands (Single Top 100)	7
New Zealand (Recorded Music NZ)	8
Norway (VG-lista)	22
Poland (Polish Airplay Top 100)	33
Poland (Polish Streaming Top 100)	16
Portugal (AFP)	14
Romania Airplay (TopHit)	74
Scottish Singles Sales (Official Charts)	42
Slovakia Singles Digital (ČNS IFPI)	15
Slovenia Airplay (SloTop50)	21
South Africa Streaming (RISA)	92
Spain (Promusicae)	23
Sweden (Tio i Topp)	1
Switzerland (Schweizer Hitparade)	4
UK Singles (Official Charts)	17
US Billboard Hot 100	6
US Adult Contemporary (Billboard)	12
US Adult Pop Airplay (Billboard)	35
US Holiday 100 (Billboard)	3
US Hot Latin Songs (Billboard)	29
US Rolling Stone Top 100	6

=== Monthly charts ===
Monthly chart performance
Chart (2025)	Peak position
Estonia Airplay (TopHit)	63

=== Year-end charts ===
2023 year-end chart performance for "Feliz Navidad"
Chart (2023)	Position
Hungary (Single Top 40)	70

2024 year-end chart performance for "Feliz Navidad"
Chart (2024)	Position
Austria (Ö3 Austria Top 40)	57

2025 year-end chart performance for "Feliz Navidad"
Chart (2025)	Position
Germany (GfK)	87

== Certifications ==
Certifications for "Feliz Navidad"
Region	Certification	Certified units/sales
Australia (ARIA)	Platinum	70,000^{‡}
Denmark (IFPI Danmark)	2× Platinum	180,000^{‡}
Germany (BVMI)	3× Gold	900,000^{‡}
Italy (FIMI)	2× Platinum	200,000^{‡}
New Zealand (RMNZ)	2× Platinum	60,000^{‡}
Portugal (AFP)	Platinum	10,000^{‡}
Spain (Promusicae)	Platinum	60,000^{‡}
United Kingdom (BPI)	2× Platinum	1,200,000^{‡}
Streaming
Greece (IFPI Greece)	Platinum	2,000,000^{†}
^{‡} Sales+streaming figures based on certification alone.^{†} Streaming-only figures based on certification alone.

== Other recordings ==
In 1980, the song was recorded in Estonian by Apelsin with lyrics by Henno Käo; however, this cover, titled "See viis", is not intended as a Christmas song. The lyrics describe the singer falling in love with someone over a song that they sing, but not being able to remember anything about the song but the melody.

In 1981, the Euro-Caribbean dance group Boney M. included a cover in their Christmas Album. This version remained an airplay favourite in the festive season throughout the decades in Europe, reaching no. 32 in the official Spanish Singles Chart. Although it has never been released as a single in the US, the cover also entered the Billboard Holiday Airplay chart reaching peak position no. 44 in 2017.

The Wiggles covered this song on their Wiggly, Wiggly Christmas album and video in 1996.

In 2002, the Nick Jr. Channel's animated TV cartoon Dora the Explorer featured a cover of the song in the Christmas-themed episode "A Present for Santa", as sung by Dora, Boots, Santa Claus (voiced by Howie Dorough from Backstreet Boys), and all the elves. In the same year, the song was covered by the SexBomb Girls on their christmas album Wish Ko sa Pasko.

In 2008, David Crowder Band released a version on the compilation album X Christmas.

In 2011, Canadian singer Michael Bublé recorded a cover medley of the song titled Mis Deseos/Felíz Navidad featuring Mexican singer Thalía for his album Christmas. Their version entered several Latin and Holiday charts on Billboard. Their version also entered charts in European countries like Belgium and Hungary. Their version was also certified Silver in the United Kingdom.

In 2012, the song was covered on the tenth episode of the fourth season of Glee, "Glee, Actually".

In 2013, American Christian pop band Unspoken recorded a cover of the song with new verses.

"Feliz Navidad" was recorded by Finnish symphonic metal artist Tarja Turunen in 2017, for her Christmas album From Spirits and Ghosts (Score for a Dark Christmas). On December 6, 2017, a music video was released for the solo version of the song. A special version was released as a single on December 8, featuring Turunen's musician friends Michael Monroe, Doro Pesch, Tony Kakko, Elize Ryd, Marko Saaresto, Timo Kotipelto, Simone Simons, Cristina Scabbia, Joe Lynn Turner, Floor Jansen, Hansi Kürsch and Sharon den Adel. The ensemble version was released as a benefit single to benefit victims of Hurricane Irma on the Caribbean island of Barbuda.

In 2020, Millennial Choirs & Orchestras released a choral and orchestrated version of the song in their album Star of Wonder.

In 2020, Thalía released a merengue version of the song. It debuted at number 17 on the Monitor Latino Pop Charts in the Dominican Republic. On its second week the song moved up to the number 6 spot on that chart with that being its peak position. It also peak at number 91 in Spain.

In 2020, American regional Mexican band Fuerza Regida released a corrido tumbado cover of the song, as the third track from their Christmas EP Navidad con la Regida.

In 2024, The Philly Specials covered the song for their charity album A Philly Special Christmas Party.

== Parodies ==
New Zealand comedian Billy T. James recorded "Maori Christmas" for a Radio Hauraki breakfast segment in 1985, which featured a medley based around "Feliz Navidad".

Bob Rivers wrote and recorded a parody called "Police Stop My Car", about driving under the influence, which appeared on his 1997 album More Twisted Christmas.

In December 2009, a parody of "Feliz Navidad" titled "The Illegal Alien Christmas Song", more commonly referred to as "Illegals in My Yard", was created by radio producers Matt Fox and A. J. Rice and posted on the website for Human Events, a Washington-based weekly publication. This parody, sung in English, played on the stereotype of Mexican immigrants as heavy drinkers and that illegal immigrants were going to "spread bubonic plague". Feliciano released a statement on December 23 on his official website:

This song has always been a bridge to the cultures that are so dear to me, never as a vehicle for a political platform of racism and hate. It's disgusting and my only wish that my song and I are distanced from the whole affair as soon as possible.

In a statement to the Associated Press the same day, Jed Babbin, Human Events site editor, apologized for "any offense that Mr. Feliciano may have taken from this parody" and removed it from the site.
