= Inside the Asylum =

2004 book by former US Undersecretary of Defense Jed Babbin

Inside the Asylum: Why the UN and Old Europe are Worse Than You Think
- Author: Jed Babbin
- Language: English
- Genre: Non-fiction
- Publisher: Regnery Publishing
- Publication date: 2004
- Publication place: United States
- ISBN: 0-89526-088-3

Inside the Asylum: Why the UN and Old Europe are Worse Than You Think is a 2004 book by former US Undersecretary of Defense Jed Babbin, which accuses the UN and "Old Europe" of anti-Americanism.

Babbin accuses the UN of having links to terrorist organizations and selling its moral legitimacy for oil and enriching itself at the expense of the Iraqi people but undermining American pressure on Saddam Hussein.

Babbin suggests that the US should leave the UN and focus on forming alliances with countries that he considers are really for freedom and democracy.

Babbin accuses Kofi Annan and his "wasteful bureaucracy of UN employees" of acting not in the name of the UN Charter to promote world peace and global security but instead channeling dirty money such as from Iraq's Oil for Food program, supporting terrorist causes, and using the Security Council to attempt to shackle the American sovereignty in its own international affairs and thereby illegitimately expanding its own vastly-overreaching political power.

== Publication information ==
- Jed Babbin. 2004. Inside the Asylum: Why the United Nations and Old Europe Are Worse Than You Think. Regnery Publishing, Inc. ISBN 0-89526-088-3.

== See also ==
- World peace
