= José Feliciano =

Puerto Rican musician (born 1945)

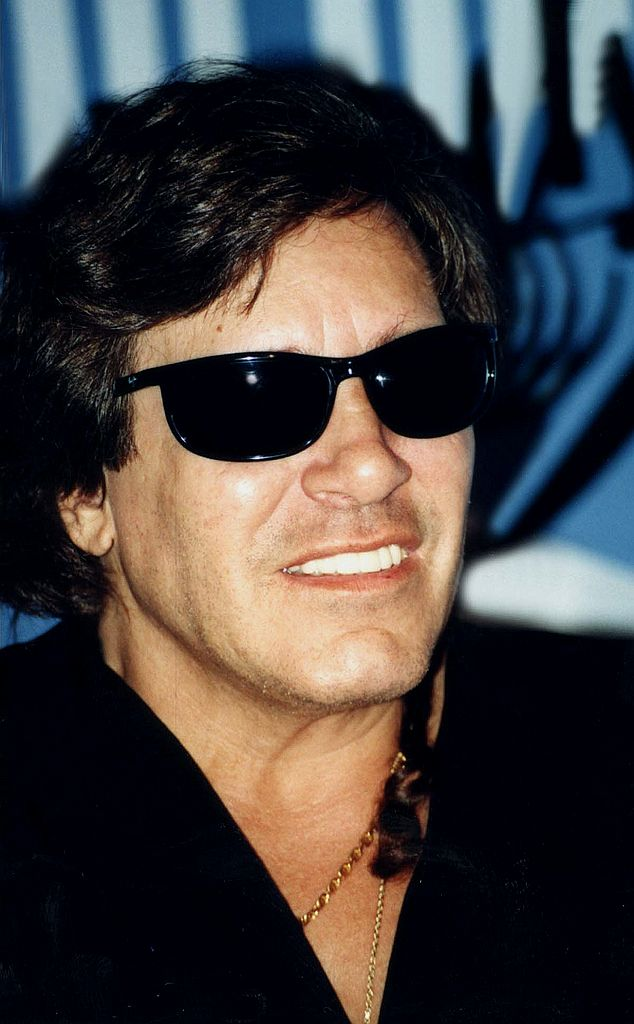
- Feliciano in 1998

Background information
- Born: José Montserrate Feliciano García; September 10, 1945 (age 81); Lares, Puerto Rico
- Genres: Latin pop; pop; soft rock; bolero
- Occupations: Musician; singer; composer
- Instruments: Guitar; cuatro; vocals
- Years active: 1962–present
- Labels: RCA Victor; Anthem
- Website: josefeliciano.com

José Montserrate Feliciano García (Spanish pronunciation: [xoˈse feliˈsjano]; born September 10, 1945) is a Puerto Rican musician. He recorded many international hits, including his rendition of the Doors' "Light My Fire" and his self-penned Christmas song "Feliz Navidad". Music genres he explores consist of a fusion of many styles, such as Latin, blues, jazz, soul and rock music, created primarily with the help of his signature acoustic guitar sound.

In the United States, Feliciano became popular in the 1960s, particularly after his 1968 album Feliciano! reached number 2 on the music charts. Since then in his career, he has released over 50 albums worldwide in both the English and Spanish languages.

== Early life and family ==
José Montserrate Feliciano García was born on September 10, 1945, in Lares, Puerto Rico, the fourth child of eleven sons. He was born blind as a result of congenital glaucoma. He was first exposed to music at the age of three, playing on a cracker tin can while accompanying his uncle who played the cuatro. When Feliciano was five, his family moved to Spanish Harlem, New York City, where he made his first public appearance at the Teatro Puerto Rico in The Bronx.

Feliciano's knack for music became apparent when at age seven, he taught himself to play the accordion. About two years later, when he was nine years old, his father gave him his first guitar. He would play his guitar by himself in his room for up to 14 hours a day and would learn by listening to 1950s rock and roll, records of classical guitarists, and jazz players. Andrés Segovia and Wes Montgomery were among his favorites. As a teenager, Feliciano took classical guitar lessons with Harold Morris, a staff music teacher at The Light House School for the Blind in New York City. Morris himself had once been a student of Segovia. In a 1969 interview, Feliciano mentioned soul music in general, and Ray Charles and Sam Cooke in particular, as influences on his singing.

At the age of 17, to help support his family, Feliciano left high school. He started frequenting the coffee houses of Greenwich Village, "passing the hat" as his "salary" in those clubs where he was invited to play. His first professional contracted performance was at The Retort, a coffee house in Detroit, Michigan.

== Career ==
=== 1960s ===
In 1963, while gaining recognition in pubs, coffee houses and clubs throughout the US and Canada, especially in Greenwich Village, New York, and Vancouver, British Columbia, he was discovered while performing at Gerde's Folk City in the Village and immediately signed by Jack Somer, an executive at RCA Victor. Feliciano recounts the story of doing an impression of Bob Dylan, only to find that Dylan was in the audience. In 1964, he released his debut single, "Everybody Do the Click" (which became a hit in the Philippines, at No. 2, staying 14 weeks in the Top Ten Hit parade) and was invited to the 1964 Newport Folk Festival. In 1965 and 1966, he released his first albums: The Voice and Guitar of José Feliciano and A Bag Full of Soul, two folk-pop-soul albums that showcased his talent on radios across the US, where in July 1963 he had been described by New York Times columnist, Robert Shelton as a "10-fingered wizard".

In 1966, Feliciano visited Mar del Plata, Argentina, to perform at the Festival de Mar del Plata. There, he so impressed the RCA Victor executives, that they wanted him to stay and record an album for them in Spanish. They were unsure how they wanted to record, so Feliciano suggested he record some of the bolero music of his parents where Feliciano then added his blues and folk influences from his experiences while playing in the Village. The result was two smash hits with the singles "Poquita Fe" ("Little Faith", also titled "Sin Fe", or "Without Faith"), and "Usted". This was the beginning of a series of successful singles, albums and gold records throughout Latin America and Hispanic communities in the United States where Feliciano revolutionized the sound of the bolero. Some of his most beloved interpretations include "La Copa Rota", "La Carcel de Sing Sing" and "Extraños en la Noche", which charted concurrently as the Spanish version of Frank Sinatra's "Strangers in the Night".

A year later, Feliciano was scheduled to perform in the United Kingdom but the authorities would not allow his guide dog, Trudy, into the country unless she was quarantined for six months. The stringent quarantine measures of those days were intended to prevent the spread of rabies. Devastated by their actions, Feliciano wrote a song about his experience entitled "No Dogs Allowed" (becoming a Netherlands Top 10 hit in 1969), which told the story of this first visit to London.

During his British visit on July 16, 1967, Feliciano gave a live performance on the pirate radio stations Radio 227 and Radio 355, on board the MV Laissez Faire off the British coast less than a month before the stations were due to be closed by the UK's Marine, &c., Broadcasting (Offences) Act 1967. He also guested on a popular British television show with Dusty Springfield and recorded two singles for RCA with London-based songwriter/producer Tom Springfield called "My Foolish Heart/Only Once" (which was played on Radio London and which he sang on Dusty Springfield's show) and "Adiós Amor/At Days End”, a song also recorded by The Casuals. Neither were hits.

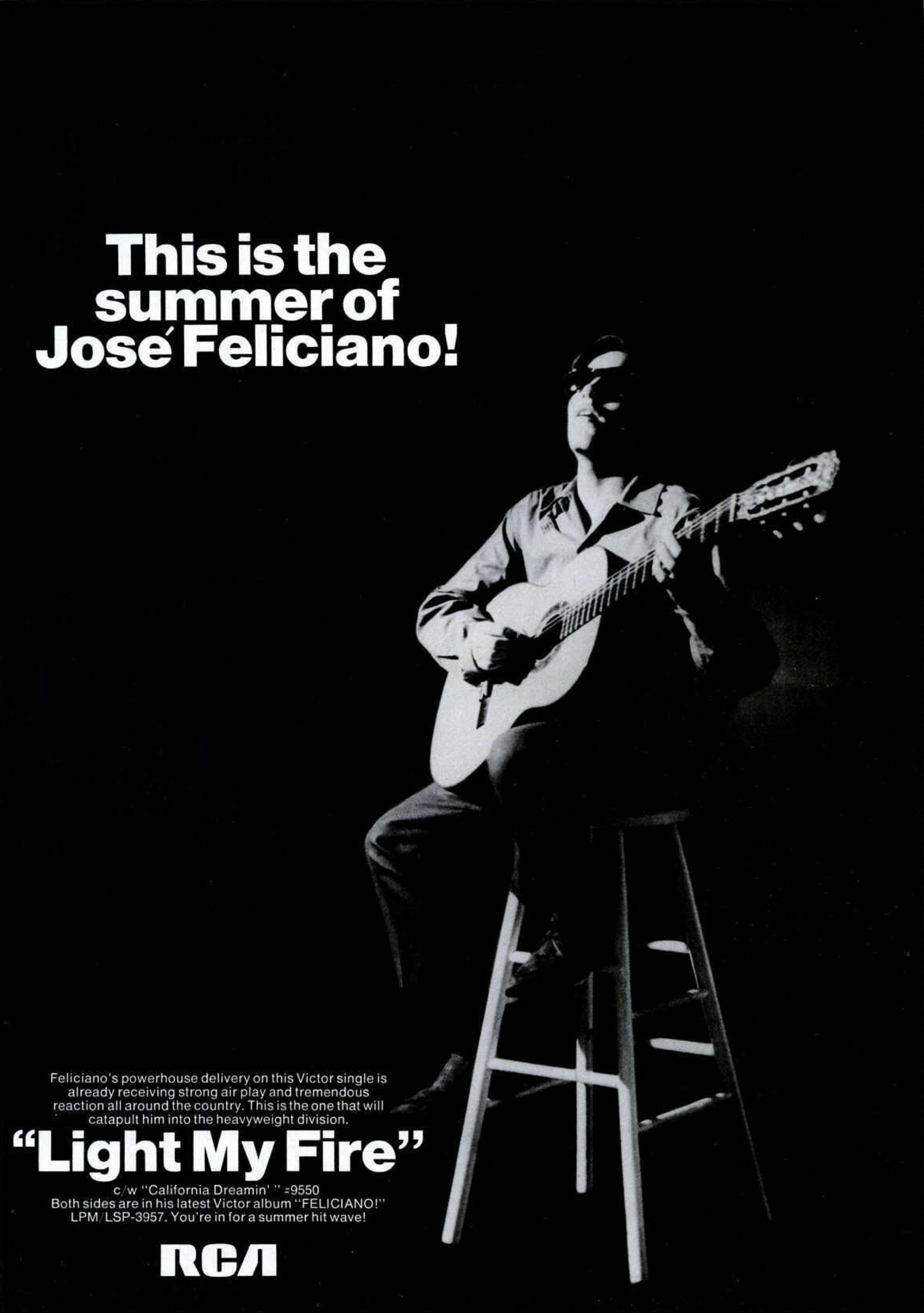
Billboard advertisement, July 13, 1968

After two more successful albums, Feliciano, now a household name throughout Latin America, moved to Los Angeles. He was introduced to RCA Victor producer, Rick Jarrard who, at the time, was also producing Harry Nilsson and Jefferson Airplane. They recorded the hit album Feliciano! together, including the Doors' song "Light My Fire". Feliciano's style was clearly defining itself by that time as that of an innovative crossover artist with soul, folk and rock influences, infused with a substantial Latin flair. RCA released "California Dreamin'" as the first single during the summer of 1968 with "Light My Fire" as the B-side. A DJ behind the mic at KJR-Radio in Seattle, Washington liked that song on the flip side, played it on the air, and it took off, reaching No. 3 on the US pop charts with over one million copies sold in the US market alone. The song became a No. 1 hit in many countries, including Canada, Brazil and the UK and was awarded a gold disc. Doors guitarist Robby Krieger has complimented the cover. On the strength of this success, Feliciano won two Grammy Awards in 1968 for Best New Artist of the Year and Best Pop Male Performance, bringing him worldwide recognition as an avant-garde pop star because of his unique "crossover" style from Latino music to English-language pop/rock. He is widely recognized as the first virtuoso classical guitarist to bring the sound of a nylon-string guitar into the pop/rock scene.

Feliciano's "Star-Spangled Banner"

On October 7, 1968, at the height of protests against the Vietnam War, Feliciano was invited by Detroit Tigers broadcaster Ernie Harwell to perform "The Star-Spangled Banner" at Tiger Stadium in Detroit during Game 5 pre-game ceremonies of the 1968 World Series between the Tigers and the St. Louis Cardinals. His personalized, slow, Latin jazz performance proved highly controversial and damaging to Feliciano's career in the months, even years, that followed. Some listeners thought he had "desecrated" and disrespected the national anthem but when asked about it, Feliciano explained that the reason he offered a non-traditional rendition of the anthem was to get people to pay attention to it. In a November 2017 NPR broadcast, he expressed pride at being the one to open the door for artists who could later interpret the nation's anthem. His World Series rendition, which features Feliciano accompanying himself on an acoustic guitar, was released as a single that charted for 5 weeks on the Billboard Hot 100, peaking at number 50; the first time the United States' anthem appeared on the American music charts. That recording of the national anthem is now on permanent exhibit in the Baseball Hall of Fame in Cooperstown, New York.

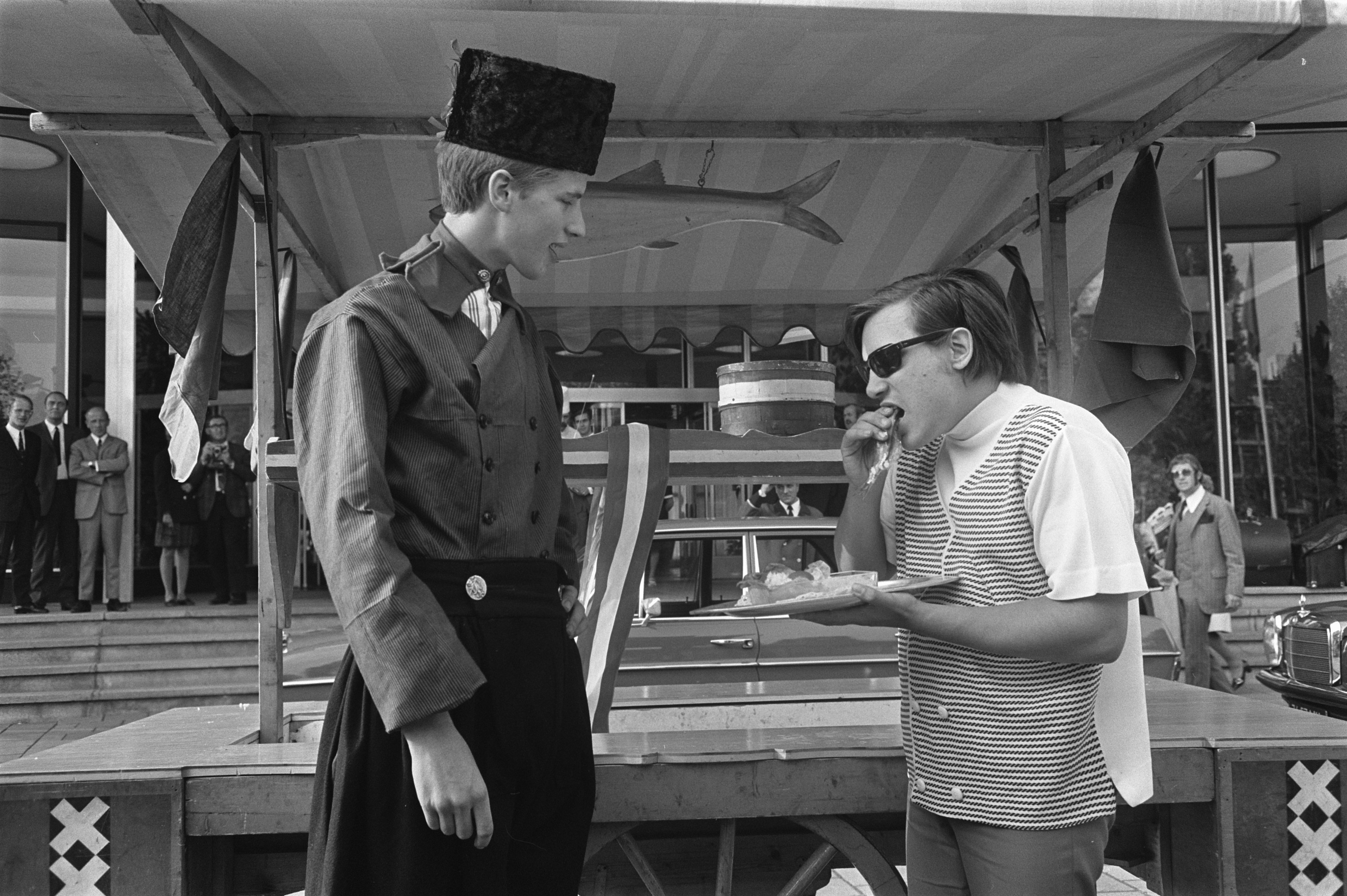
Feliciano trying herring in Amsterdam (1970)

In 1969, Feliciano recorded two more albums with Rick Jarrard, 10 to 23 and the London Palladium double-disc LP, Alive Alive-O!, both of which were awarded gold discs. Around this time RCA re-released "Adiós Amor/At Days End” in the UK, Australia, Canada, New Zealand and Europe. Written by Tom Springfield and Norman Newell and apparently, originally declined by the Australian folk/pop quartet The Seekers, it became Feliciano's biggest hit in Australia, reaching the Top 10 in 1969. He also worked with Quincy Jones on the Mackenna's Gold movie soundtrack, where he recorded the theme song "Old Turkey Buzzard" and appeared on numerous US television shows, performing duets with Johnny Cash, Bing Crosby, Glen Campbell, Andy Williams, and Diana Ross.

Feliciano's many television appearances through the 1960s and into the 1970s included: The Ed Sullivan Show, The Smothers Brothers Comedy Hour, The Merv Griffin Show, The Flip Wilson Show, Hee Haw, The Sonny and Cher Show, The Midnight Special, and The Tonight Show Starring Johnny Carson.

On April 27, 1969, the NBC television network aired a TV special titled: Feliciano! Very Special, starring Feliciano with guest artists Burt Bacharach, The Blossoms, Glen Campbell, Dionne Warwick, and Andy Williams.

=== 1970s ===
Feliz Navidad

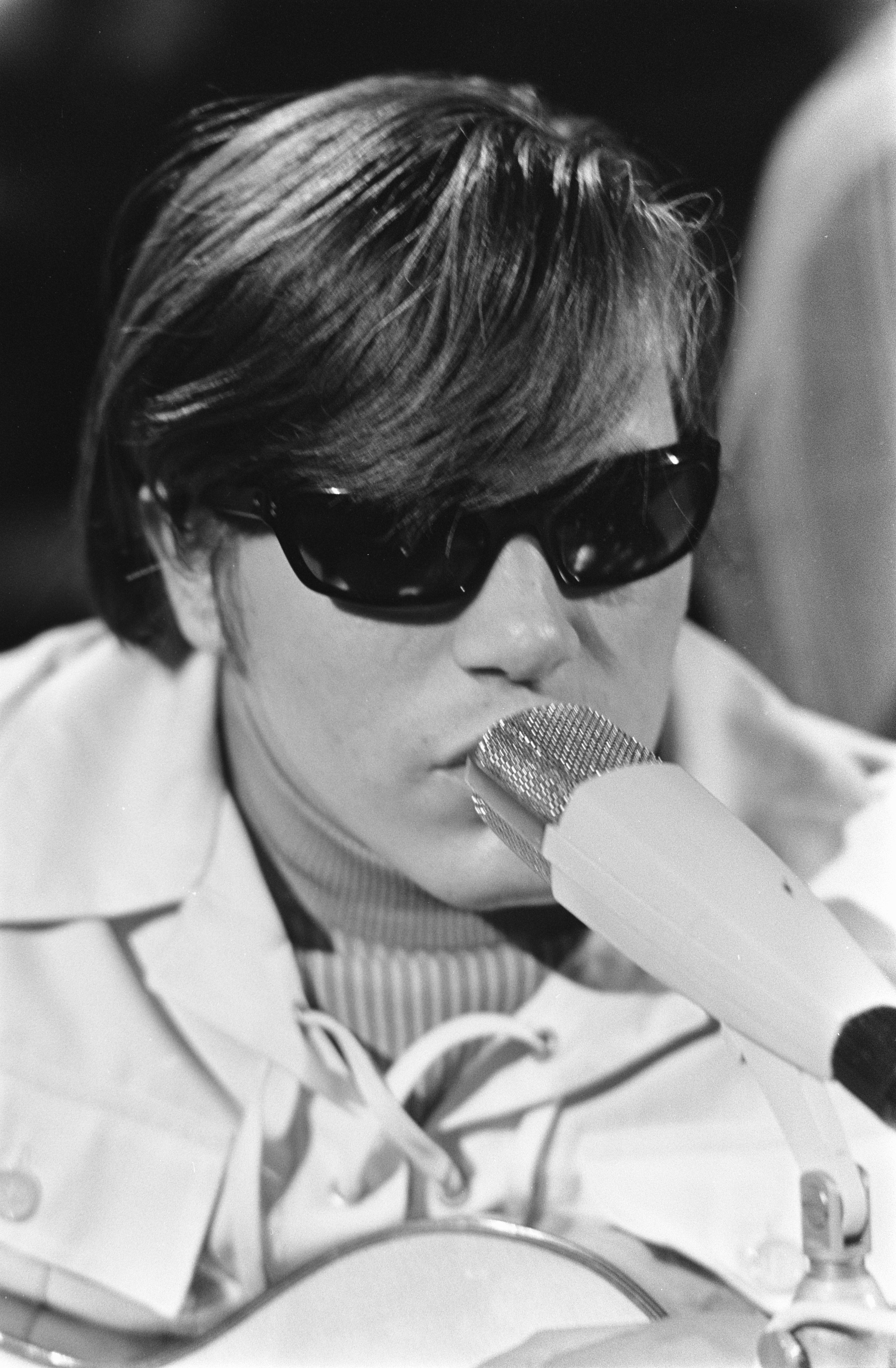
Feliciano in 1970

In 1970, Feliciano released an album of Christmas music, again with Rick Jarrard, originally entitled Jose Feliciano, festively resembling a Christmas present in gold wrapping with a big green and red bow. Later, the album would assume the name of its most unlikely selection, that of Feliciano's composition "Feliz Navidad". During the recording process, Jarrard had suggested that Feliciano write a new Christmas song for the album. Feliciano thought it impractical but began reminiscing about his childhood in Puerto Rico, and soon "Feliz Navidad" was born. "Feliz Navidad" has been covered internationally by hundreds of artists, becoming a traditional part of the musical landscape around the world at Christmas time. Each year during the Christmas season, "Feliz Navidad" remains one of the most played and most downloaded songs of the season. "Feliz Navidad" is also recognized by ASCAP as one of the 25 all-time most-played Christmas songs in the world and it is in the Grammy Hall of Fame.

In 1971, Feliciano traveled to Italy to participate in the Sanremo Music Festival, singing the song "Che sarà" in Italian, earning a joint second place with Ricchi e Poveri along with a standing ovation from the Italian public. Feliciano later recorded the song with Jarrard, which became a success in Italy, and in much of Europe, including the Eastern Bloc countries, as well as in Asia. They recorded it in Spanish as "Qué será", which became a hit in Central and South America, and in English as "Shake a Hand", which was a hit in the Scandinavian countries.

Feliciano wrote and performed the theme song to the 1970s comedy series Chico and the Man, and played a guest role in one episode as the cousin of Chico (Freddie Prinze), singer Pepe Fernando. In the 1970s, he acted and composed for television series and movies including McMillan & Wife, Kung Fu, and the soundtrack for the 1976 movie Aaron Loves Angela. He has also been a guest performer on many albums by other artists, including Bill Withers's +'Justments, John Lennon's Rock 'n' Roll, Joni Mitchell's Court and Spark, Michael Nesmith's Tantamount to Treason Vol. 1, and has given concerts with Carlos Santana, Cat Stevens, and Paul Simon.

In 1975, on his last RCA album Just Wanna Rock'n'Roll, Feliciano released his jazz-funk-Latin instrumental composition "Affirmation", which was re-released a year later by jazz guitarist George Benson on his hit album Breezin.

In early 1974, Feliciano performed behind the Iron Curtain in Prague, Czechoslovakia, sharing the stage there with Czech idol, Karel Gott.

In 1979, Feliciano recorded a spontaneous version of his 1968 hit "Light My Fire" as a duet with rhythm and blues/pop singer Minnie Riperton. The duet was included on Riperton's final studio album for Capitol Records. Riperton died of cancer two months after its release. Feliciano recalls that the duet was unplanned, which is why he is not heard until the second half of the song. He and Riperton were friends and he just happened to be working in an adjoining studio while she was recording and popped in to say hello.

=== 1980s ===
During the 1980s, after a brief stay on Motown with two English-language albums produced by Berry Gordy in 1981 and Rick Jarrard in 1983, Feliciano was a guest on the 1983 NBC television show Motown 25: Yesterday, Today, Forever. Also during this time period, Jose Feliciano's manager Burl Hechtman and promoters Gary Mason and Leonardo Schultz met with President of Motown Records Jay Lasker and convinced him to record a Spanish album. They promised Lasker "big sales" and a Grammy nomination. The album would be produced by Leonardo Schultz and Exec Produced by Mason under the watchful eye of Hechtman. The album entitled Escenas de Amor was a big hit in the Latin market and garnered a Grammy nomination for Best Latin Pop Performance. A second album was green-lighted by Lasker, entitled Me Enamore with the same production team, which was an even bigger hit, and received a Grammy for Best Latin Pop Performance. During this time period, Mason and Schultz also arranged for Feliciano to perform at the Festival Internacional de la Canción de Viña del Mar. Feliciano left Motown and released a number of successful records for that market, including the Motown albums Escenas de Amor and Me Enamoré, as well as others from RCA, EMI, and Capitol, garnering 4 more Grammy Awards for best Latin Performer. He recorded a duet called Por Ella with the most popular Mexican singer at the time, José José, which became a Latin hit. In the 1980s and into the 1990s, José recorded duets with Natalie Cole ("More Than the Stars" on her 1987 album Everlasting), Gloria Estefan (Tengo Que Decirte Algo on her 2000 album Alma Caribeña), Chamaco Rivera (Consuelo on his 1984 album Por Fin), jazz singer Diane Schuur ("By Design" and "The American Wedding Song" on her 1985 album Schuur Thing), and Paul Simon ("Born in Puerto Rico" on his 1997 album Songs from The Capeman). In 1982, Feliciano played guitar on the DeBarge record All This Love. In 1987, Feliciano gave two concerts in East Germany: One in Leipzig and another in East Berlin with the Berliner Sinfonie-Orchester.

Walk of Fame

Feliciano received his star on the Hollywood Walk of Fame on December 1, 1987. Feliciano was honored by the City of New York, which renamed Public School 155 as the José Feliciano Performing Arts School. His hands were cast on Madame Tussauds Museum's Wall of Fame and he has a star on the Walk of Fame of his native Puerto Rico. He also had a hit in 1987 in Austria with the song "The Sound of Vienna", which reached number 1 there for 4 weeks, and recorded with the Vienna Symphony Orchestra. The Orchestra also performed with him live on national television at Danube Park in Vienna before more than 60,000 people.

=== 1990s ===
Following the births of his children in 1988, 1991, and 1995, Feliciano spent more time close to home. During this period, he co-hosted a weekly live radio programme called Speaking of Music on WMMM in Westport, Connecticut, alongside the station's owner and programmer Mark Graham. The show featured discussions about music across various genres, live performances, listener call-ins, and interviews with guest artists. Feliciano held the role for over a year, later describing it as a valuable learning experience.

Feliciano released a cover version of Richard Marx's "Right Here Waiting" in early 1990, and in 1994, he recorded a dance record in English entitled "Goin' Krazy" (MJM Records) under the pseudonym JF?. Latino disk jockeys around the world supported the record, helping the 12-inch dance record chart on Billboard and earning him new and younger fans.

In 1996, Feliciano made a cameo appearance as himself in the film Fargo, performing as a lounge singer.

Feliciano was also an inaugural member of the Independent Music Awards' judging panel to support independent artists.

=== 2000s ===
Feliciano was presented the 2000 Grammy Legend Award at the 42nd Annual Grammy Awards, as well as performed the theme song "Behind the Mask" for the television series Queen of Swords also in 2000.

In 2000, Guitarra Mía, a special tribute to Feliciano, was produced by the Banco Popular de Puerto Rico and aired both in Puerto Rico and in the US. This television special (and its soundtrack) featured Feliciano and many Puerto Rican and international stars singing some of his most famous songs, along with his personal favorites from other artists. It was first aired in December 2000, just 2 days after his mother died unexpectedly from a heart attack. The special's final scenes featured her giving her son a standing ovation, recorded for the occasion a month before.

On December 6, 2006, Feliciano's Spanish album, José Feliciano y Amigos, was released by Universal Records, featuring Feliciano in duets with other Latin American stars including Luis Fonsi, Lupillo Rivera, Luciano Pereyra, Rudy Pérez, Cristian Castro, Marc Anthony, Ramón Ayala, Alicia Villarreal, Ricardo Montaner, and Raúl di Blasio. A special edition was later released, featuring Ana Gabriel and Gloria Estefan.

In 2007, Feliciano released an album called Soundtrax of My Life, the first English-language album completely self-penned.

On October 16, 2007, Feliciano appeared on the Late Show with David Letterman to perform "Old Turkey Buzzard", the theme song from Mackenna's Gold. For several months prior, Letterman had been using a clip from the movie and song as a running gag.

In 2008, Feliciano, a practicing Catholic, performed at the Papal Mass at Yankee Stadium in New York.

In 2009, Feliciano was awarded his 7th Grammy for the album Señor Bolero.

=== 2010s ===
On May 10, 2010, Feliciano performed his rendition of "The Star-Spangled Banner" at Comerica Park in Detroit. This was part of the remembrance of Detroit Tigers radio announcer Ernie Harwell, who had recently died on May 4. Requested to perform it by Harwell himself, before he died, Jose played it the way he had in 1968 with his acoustic guitar and his slow tempo, Latin jazz style.

On December 15, 2010, Feliciano appeared as the featured guest on the 37th episode of Daryl Hall's Webbie-Award-winning webcast Live From Daryl's House. Feliciano and Hall took turns on several numbers, including Feliciano's version of Light My Fire. On November 9, 2011, Feliciano received the Latin Grammy Lifetime Achievement Award from the Latin Academy of Recording Arts & Sciences.

In 2011, Feliciano signed with manager Howard Perl and MBM Entertainment who immediately brought him to The Agency Group. In January 2012, he was a guest in Memphis for the celebration of Elvis Presley's birthday, where he announced the release (on August 7, 2012) of his new album The King, a tribute to Presley produced in collaboration with Presley's best friend, radio personality George Klein and released by Johnny Phillips' Select-O-Hits label. On September 19, 2012, in honor of Hispanic Heritage Month, he was invited to sing God Bless America for the seventh-inning stretch of the New York Yankees game at Yankee Stadium. Additionally, less than a month later, on October 14, 2012, Feliciano returned to baseball's post-season, and on national television, once again rendered his stylized version of the Star-Spangled Banner in San Francisco before the first game of the National League's Championship Series against the St. Louis Cardinals. Soon Feliciano appeared on a song with reggaeton artist Farruko called Su hija me gusta, where a young man tells a father I like your daughter. He also began recording sessions with Producers Howard Perl, Jon Guggenheim, Juan Cristobal Losada, Wyclef Jean, Plácido Domingo, Billy Ray Cyrus, and Frank Licari.

Feliciano sang a duet in 2014 with one of the most famous Serbian singers, Dragana Mirković

In 2017, Feliciano performed a cover of The Police’s 'Every Breath You Take'.

In November 2017, Feliciano released a jazz and R&B album with UK musician Jools Holland and sold out a 33-date tour throughout the UK and Ireland. The album became a hit and reached number 24 in the UK charts, the first time for an LP by Feliciano after his 1970 LP Fireworks.

=== 2018–present: Feliciano celebrates his golden anniversary ===
The year 2018 marked the 50th anniversary of Feliciano's entry onto the international music scene with his RCA recording of Feliciano!, which featured "Light My Fire". Feliciano's golden anniversary year was highlighted in May with his return to his homeland of Puerto Rico. The event was held at the Luis A. Ferré Performing Arts Center, Centro de Bellas Artes, and was called José Feliciano: Transcendental 50th Aniversario de Oro y su Legado. To a full house, Feliciano and his homeland public shared his 50 years of musical celebrity in the two-hour spectacle.

On Flag Day, June 14, 2018, Feliciano was the keynote address speaker for the Smithsonian National Museum of American History in Washington, D.C. where 19 new citizens pledged their allegiance to the United States. The event was held in Flag Hall, where the actual banner that flew over Fort McHenry in 1814, inspiring Francis Scott Key to write the poem which would become "The Star-Spangled Banner" is exhibited. At this same event, a donation ceremony was held where Feliciano presented to the Smithsonian Museum his Candelas guitar with which he first rendered "The Star-Spangled Banner", causing a national furor in 1968, along with other personal objects for the Smithsonian's permanent collection.

On September 8, 2018, Feliciano was invited by the Detroit Tigers baseball team to return to their field and perform the "Star-Spangled Banner" again as he had in 1968. The Tigers were facing the St. Louis Cardinals again and they wanted Feliciano to recapture the moment reminiscent of their own 50th anniversary of winning the World Series. This time around, the performance was met not with undertones of the hatred and hostility of 1968 but rather, with the uproarious cheers of an enthusiastically grateful crowd. Fifty years later, "Feliciano was finally at peace with his being the first artist to stylize the National Anthem publicly."

Feliciano's golden anniversary year culminated with a Christmas performance at the Vatican to perform in their annual Christmas celebration, Concerto di Natale, 2018. During their time in Rome, Feliciano and his son, Jonnie, were invited to attend a private audience with Pope Francis.

In January 2019, Feliciano was invited to appear on The Tonight Show with Jimmy Fallon where they took their show on the road to Puerto Rico with composer, actor and producer Lin-Manuel Miranda to show the world that "The spirit and soul of Puerto Rico and her people are alive and well and that the Island, ravaged by Hurricane Maria in 2017, is indeed, 'Open for Business.' " Feliciano was joined onstage with Puerto Rico's hottest reggaeton and Latin trap singer, Ozuna, where together they performed their Island's sentimental anthem, "En Mi Viejo San Juan". A studio version of the song was subsequently recorded for Anthem Records and released on June 7, 2019, on all of the major digital platforms around the world. Twenty percent of its proceeds are going to Miranda's Flamboyan Arts Fund, which supports all facets of the arts including music, theater, visual arts, dance, literature and arts education programs for youth and thus ensures that arts and culture continue to flourish during the reconstruction of Puerto Rico.

On the same weekend in New York City, Feliciano was honored during the 62nd Puerto Rican Day Parade, Inc. with a Lifetime Achievement Award, honoring him for his contributions to the world of music, while celebrating his roots and love for his island home.

During May and June 2019, Feliciano was recording an album for Anthem Records in both Nashville and Connecticut with his long-time producer, Rick Jarrard. The album is called Behind This Guitar and was released on January 31, 2020.

== Banned by the Cuban Revolution ==
The Cuban Revolution exerted strict ideological control over cultural expression, leading to the censorship and banning of numerous musicians and artists, in the 1960s and 1970s, who were deemed counter-revolutionary or too closely associated with capitalist influences. Notable figures such as the Beatles, Santana, Julio Iglesias and Celia Cruz fell under this ban. Among those affected was Feliciano, who faced restrictions following comments he made about Puerto Rico's independence.

== Personal life ==
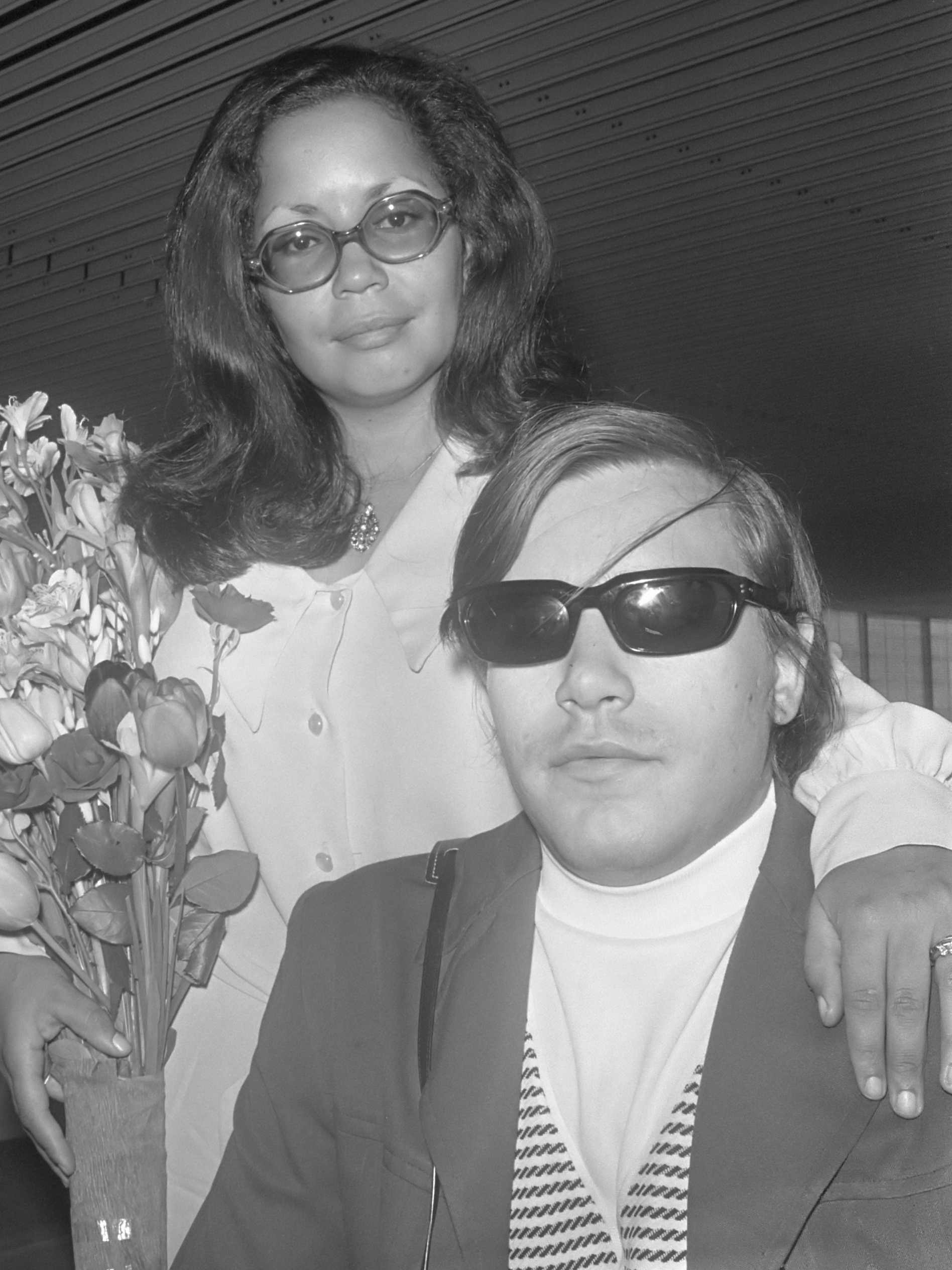
Feliciano and his first wife Janna (1970)

Feliciano has been married twice. He and his first wife, Janna (née Hilda Pérez, 1945–2018), divorced in 1978.

In 1971, Ernie Harwell introduced Feliciano to Susan Omillian (b. c. 1954) a young Detroit art student. Harwell and Omillian originally met during Feliciano's controversial rendition of the national anthem in 1968.

Feliciano and Omillian dated for 11 years before marrying in 1982. The couple have two sons and one daughter and resides in Weston, Connecticut.

=== Parody controversy ===
In December 2009, a parody of "Feliz Navidad" titled "The Illegal Alien Christmas Song" was created by radio producers Matt Fox and A. J. Rice and posted on the website for Human Events, an American conservative political website. The parody, sung in English, played on the racial stereotype of Mexican immigrants as heavy drinkers and that illegal immigrants were going to "spread bubonic plague".

Feliciano released a statement on December 23 on his official website:

This song has always been a bridge to the cultures that are so dear to me, never as a vehicle for a political platform of racism and hate. It's disgusting and my only wish that my song and I are distanced from the whole affair as soon as possible.

In a statement to the Associated Press the same day, Jed Babbin, Human Events site editor, apologized for "any offense that Mr. Feliciano may have taken from this parody" and removed it from the site.

== Awards and nominations ==
=== Billboard Latin Music Awards ===
| Year | Category | Work | Result |
|---|---|---|---|
| 1996 | Latin Music Lifetime Achievement Award | Himself | Honored |
| 2022 | Billboard Legend Award | Himself | Honored |

=== Emmy Awards ===
| Year | Category | Work | Result |
|---|---|---|---|
| 1975 | Outstanding Achievement in Special Musical Material | "Chico and the Man" (theme song) | Nominated |

=== Grammy Awards ===
| Year | Category | Work | Result |
|---|---|---|---|
| 1969 | Best New Artist Of The Year | Himself | Won |
| 1969 | Best Contemporary Pop Vocal Performance, Male | "Light My Fire" | Won |
| 1969 | Album Of The Year | Feliciano! | Nominated |
| 1969 | Best Contemporary-Pop Performance, Instrumental | "Here, There and Everywhere" | Nominated |
| 1983 | Best Latin Pop Performance | Escenas De Amor | Nominated |
| 1984 | Best Latin Pop Performance | "Me Enamore" | Won |
| 1985 | Best Latin Pop Performance | Como Tu Quieres | Nominated |
| 1986 | Best Latin Pop Performance | Ya Soy Tuyo | Nominated |
| 1986 | Best Latin Pop Performance | "Por Ella" | Nominated |
| 1987 | Best Latin Pop Performance | "Le Lo Lai" | Won |
| 1990 | Best Latin Pop Performance | "Cielito Lindo" | Won |
| 1991 | Best Latin Pop Performance | Por Que Te Tengo Que Olvidar? | Won |
| 1994 | Best Latin Pop Album | Latin Street '92 | Nominated |
| 1997 | Best Latin Pop Performance | Americano | Nominated |
| 1999 | Best Latin Pop Performance | Senor Bolero | Nominated |
| 2009 | Best Tropical Latin Album | Señor Bachata | Won |

=== Latin Grammy Awards ===
| Year | Category | Work | Result |
|---|---|---|---|
| 2008 | Best Contemporary Tropical Album | Señor Bachata | Won |
| 2009 | Best Ranchero Album | Con México en el Corazón | Nominated |
| 2011 | Lifetime Achievement Award | Himself | Honored |

=== Miscellaneous awards ===
| Year | Award | Category | Work | Result |
|---|---|---|---|---|
| 2000 | International Latin Music Hall of Fame | | Himself | Honored |
| 2013 | Latin Songwriters Hall of Fame | | Himself | Inducted |

- In Ponce, Feliciano is recognized at the Illustrious Ponce Citizens Plaza of the Parque del Tricentenario.

== Discography ==
=== Studio albums ===
- The Voice and Guitar of José Feliciano (1965)
- A Bag Full of Soul (1966)
- Fantastic Feliciano (1966)
- El Sentimiento (1966)
- La Copa Rota (1966)
- Sombra, Una Guitarra y Boleros (1967)
- El Fantastico! (1967)
- Feliciano! (1968)
- Sin Luz (1968)
- Souled (1968)
- Feliciano/10to23 (1969)
- Fireworks (1970)
- José Feliciano (Feliz Navidad) (1970)
- En Mi Soledad - No Llores Más (1971)
- That the Spirit Needs (1971)
- Dos Cruces/El Jinete (1972)
- Memphis Menu (1972)
- Compartments (1973)
- And the Feeling's Good (1974)
- For My Love... Mother Music (1974)
- Affirmation (1975)
- Just Wanna Rock 'n' Roll (1975)
- Angela (1976)
- Sweet Soul Music (1976)
- José Feliciano (1981)
- Escenas de Amor (1982)
- Romance in the Night (1983)
- Me Enamoré (1983)
- Como Tú Quieres (1984)
- Ya Soy Tuyo (1985)
- Te Amaré (1986)
- Tu Inmenso Amor (1987)
- I'm Never Gonna Change (1989)
- Niña (1990)
- Steppin' Out (1990)
- Latin Street '92 (1992)
- Americano (1996)
- On Second Thought (1997)
- Señor Bolero (1998)
- Guitarra Mia: Un Tributo a José Feliciano (2000)
- Señor Bolero Vol. 2 (2003)
- A México... Con Amor (2004)
- Six-String Lady (2006)
- The Genius of José Feliciano (2007)
- José Feliciano y Amigos (2007)
- Señor Bachata (2007)
- The Soundtrax of My Life (2007)
- Con México en el Corazón (2008)
- American Classics (digital download only, 2009)
- Djangoisms (2009)
- The Genius of José Feliciano, Vol. 2 (2011)
- The King... by José Feliciano (2012)
- As You See Me Now (with Jools Holland, 2017)
- Mozart Castrato Arias (with Arno Raunig, 2017)
- Behind This Guitar (2020)

== See also ==
- List of best-selling Latin music artists
- List of Puerto Ricans
- List of Puerto Rican songwriters
