= Messiah in America =

Oratorio by Brett Stewart

Messiah in America is a 34-movement, 7-part oratorio composed by Brett Stewart. Its subject is Christ's visitation to the Americas, as depicted in the Book of Mormon. It is written for a choir, a children's chorus, Soprano, Alto, Tenor and Bass soloists, full orchestra and organ. The libretto was compiled by Brett Stewart and Bruce Richardson from the Book of Mormon and the Bible with no poetic insertions, in order to maintain scriptural integrity.

It debuted in concert on March 31, 2010, at the Renée and Henry Segerstrom Concert Hall of the Segerstrom Center for the Arts in Costa Mesa, California by the Orange County group of the Millennial Choirs and Orchestras. The oratorio was recorded in Abravanel Hall in Salt Lake City, Utah, by all of Millennial Choirs and Orchestras. It was released as an album on December 13, 2011, and debuted as No. 1 on Billboard's Traditional Classical Album list.

== Musical style ==
Brett Stewart's brother, Brandon Stewart describes him as a Neo-Romantic Contemporary. The great majority of the work is written in a Romantic style. However, it draws from every Western Music style period. Many elements, passages, and even whole movements are written in Baroque or Classical styles. Contemporary elements are throughout the work, most notably in the percussive tenth movement "There Arose a Great Storm". Movement fourteen has significant melismatic passages. The final movement "Amen" contains a fugal section.

== Movements ==
=== Part One: Prophecy and Prelude ===
I. One fold, One Shepherd - Chorus (John 10:16, 3 Nephi 15:21, 2 Nephi 29:7-9)

II. Overture: Victory March - Symphony orchestra

III. May the Lord Preserve His People - Chorus (3 Nephi 4:30-32)

IV. And Their Hearts Were Swollen With Joy - Alto (3 Nephi 4:33)

=== Part Two: Declination & Destruction ===
V. There Began to Be Some Disputings - Bass (3 Nephi 6:10-14)

VI. Now the Cause of This Iniquity - Bass (3 Nephi 6:15, 18)

VII. And the People Were Divided - Chorus (3 Nephi 7:2)

VIII. The People Turned From Their Righteousness - Bass (3 Nephi 7:8)

IX. Peace but a Few Years - Chorus (3 Nephi 6:16-17)

X. There Arose a Great Storm - Chorus (3 Nephi 8:5-17, 9:6-10)

XI. There Was Thick Darkness - Alto (3 Nephi 8: 20–23, 25)

XII. O That We Had Repented - Chorus (3 Nephi 8:24-25)

=== Part Three: The Voice ===
XIII. There Was a Voice Heard - Tenor (3 Nephi 9:1)

XIV. Wo, Wo, Wo Unto This People - Tenor (3 Nephi 9:2, 13)

XV. O Ye People of the House of Israel - Tenor and Bass (3 Nephi 10:4-6)

XVI. And The Darkness Dispersed - Tenor (3 Nephi 10:9-10)

=== Part Four: The Appearance ===
XVII. There Were a Great Multitude Gathered - Soprano and Alto (3 Nephi 11:1-3)

XVIII. Behold My Beloved Son - Chorus (3 Nephi 11:7)

XIX. And They Cast Their Eyes Up Again Towards Heaven - Soprano (3 Nephi 11:8)

XX. And He Stretched Forth His Hand - Soprano (3 Nephi 11:9)

XXI. Behold, I Am Jesus Christ - Chorus (3 Nephi 11:10-11)

XXII. And the Whole Multitude - Soprano (3 Nephi 11:12-13)

XXIII. Arise and Come Forth Unto Me - Quartet and Chorus (3 Nephi 11:14-15)

XXIV. Hosanna! - Quartet and Chorus (3 Nephi 11:16-17)

=== Part Five: Blessings & Worship ===
XXV. Jesus Cast His Eyes Round About - Tenor (3 Nephi 17:5, 11–12, 15)

XXVI. The Eye Hath Never Seen - Children and Chorus (3 Nephi 17:16-17)

XXVII. And Jesus Arose - Alto (3 Nephi 17:18-20, 17:6-8)

XXVIII. Behold Your Little Ones - Children (3 Nephi 17:21-23)

XXIX. They Cast Their Eyes Toward Heaven - Soprano and Chorus (3 Nephi 17:24)

=== Part Six: The Ascension ===
XXX. And There Came a Cloud - Soprano (3 Nephi 18:38-39)

=== Part Seven: Meditation & Postlude ===
XXXI. Verily, Verily, I Say Unto You - Bass (3 Nephi 16:16-17)

XXXII. Thy Watchmen Shall Lift Up The Voice - Quartet and Chorus (3 Nephi 16:18-20, Isaiah 52:8-10)

XXXIII. And the Holy One of Israel Must Reign - Chorus (1 Nephi 22:24-25, 3 Nephi 15:26)

XXXIV. Amen - Chorus (3 Nephi 5:26, 11:17)

== See also ==
- Millennial Choirs and Orchestras
