= Alive Alive-O! =

Live album by José Feliciano
- Released: November 1969
- Recorded: April 21, 1969
- Venues: London Palladium, London
- Label: RCA Victor
- Producer: Rick Jarrard

José Feliciano chronology
Feliciano/10 to 23 (1969)	Alive Alive-O! (1969)	Fireworks (1970)

Professional ratings
Review scores
Source	Rating
AllMusic	4.5/5 stars
The Encyclopedia of Popular Music	2/5 stars
The Rolling Stone Album Guide	2/5 stars

Alive Alive-o! is an album by Puerto Rican guitarist José Feliciano, released in 1969.

Released at the apex of Feliciano's career, the album reached No. 29 on the Billboard albums chart. It was one of the few double albums of that time to get "Gold" certification in the United States. The album reached no. 19 in Canada, no. 1 in the Netherlands, no. 4 in Spain and was a hit in other countries as well. It was recorded live in London at the London Palladium Theatre on April 21, 1969.

== Track listing ==
1. "God Save the Queen" (Traditional; arranged by Westerly Garde)
2. "Hi-Heel Sneakers'" (Robert Higginbotham)
3. "Rain" (José Feliciano, Hilda Feliciano)
4. "Malagueña" (Ernesto Lecuona)
5. "El Jinete" (José Alfredo Jiménez)
6. "Nobody Knows You When You're Down and Out" (Jimmy Cox)
7. "El Voh" (Dorival Caymmi)
8. "The Comedy Bit"
9. "Guantanamera" (Joseíto Fernández; original words by José Martí; adapted and arranged by Westerly Garde)
10. "No Dogs Allowed" (José Feliciano, Hilda Feliciano)
11. "Mama Don't Allow It" (Cow Cow Davenport)
12. "Don't Let the Sun Catch You Crying" (Gerry Marsden, Freddie Marsden, Les Chadwick, Les Maguire)
13. "Day Tripper" (John Lennon, Paul McCartney)
14. "A Day in the Life" (John Lennon, Paul McCartney)
15. "Medley: Felicidade (Antônio Carlos Jobim) / Samba de Orfeu (Luiz Bonfá) / Manhã de Carnaval (Luiz Bonfá)
16. "California Dreamin'" (John Phillips, Michelle Phillips)
17. "Light My Fire" (Robbie Krieger, Jim Morrison, Ray Manzarek, John Densmore)
18. "La Entrada de Bilboa (Note: The title as it is listed on the album is misspelled. The city in the song is called Bilbao and the title would translate to "The Entry of Bilbao" in English.) (Battle of Entrada)" (José Feliciano)

== Personnel ==
- José Feliciano – 12-string guitar, 6-string guitar, percussion effects, vocals
- Paulinho Magalhães – drums
- Brian Brocklehurst – bass
- Peter Ahern – percussion
- Vic Lewis – presenter

== Charts ==
Chart performance for Alive Alive-O!
Chart (1969)	Peak position
Canada Top Albums/CDs (RPM)	19
Dutch Albums (Album Top 100)	1
UK Albums (Official Charts)	23
US Billboard 200	29

== Certifications ==
Certifications for Alive Alive O!
Region	Certification	Certified units/sales
United States (RIAA)	Gold	500,000^{^}
^{^} Shipments figures based on certification alone.
