= Feliciano! =

Studio album by José Feliciano
- Released: June 1968
- Recorded: November 21, 1967 – January 6, 1968
- Studios: RCA's Music Center of the World, Hollywood, California
- Genre: Latin jazz
- Length: 37:18
- Label: RCA Victor
- Producer: Rick Jarrard

José Feliciano chronology
Fantastic Feliciano (1966)	Feliciano! (1968)	Souled (1968)

Professional ratings
Review scores
Source	Rating
AllMusic	4.5/5 stars
The Encyclopedia of Popular Music	4/5 stars
The Rolling Stone Album Guide	2/5 stars

Feliciano! is the eighth studio album by the Puerto Rican guitarist José Feliciano. All of the tracks are acoustic cover versions of songs popularized by other artists, including The Mamas & the Papas, The Doors, Gerry and the Pacemakers, The Beatles, Jorge Ben Jor, and Lou Johnson.

Feliciano! has been the most successful album of his career in the US, spending 59 weeks on the Billboard Top LP chart, peaking at number 2 (number 25 on the end-of-year chart for 1968 and number 66 for 1969); it also reached number 3 on the R&B charts in 1968 and number 3 on the Jazz charts. The album performed well outside the US, reaching number 1 in Canada and number 6 in the UK.

Feliciano! was nominated for Album of the Year at the 1969 Grammy Awards, and Jose Feliciano won Best New Artist. He also won Best Male Pop Vocal Performance for the song "Light My Fire" from the album. The album's producer Rick Jarrard also received a nomination for Producer of the Year.

The album cover shows a drawing by George Bartell of Feliciano with his guitar.

== Track listing ==
Side one

1. "California Dreamin'" (John Phillips, Michelle Phillips) – 4:06
2. "Light My Fire" (Robbie Krieger, Jim Morrison, Ray Manzarek, John Densmore) – 3:30
3. "Don't Let the Sun Catch You Crying" (Gerry Marsden) – 2:50
4. "In My Life" (John Lennon, Paul McCartney) – 3:22
5. "And I Love Her" (instrumental) (Lennon, McCartney) – 3:58

Side two

1. "Nena Na Na" (Jorge Ben) – 2:30
2. "Always Something There to Remind Me" (Burt Bacharach, Hal David) – 2:58
3. "Just a Little Bit of Rain" (Fred Neil) – 2:45
4. "Sunny" (Bobby Hebb) – 3:28
5. "Here, There and Everywhere" (instrumental) (Lennon, McCartney) – 2:03
6. "The Last Thing on My Mind" (Tom Paxton) – 4:51

== Personnel ==
- José Feliciano – classical guitar, vocals, arrangements
- Ray Brown – double bass
- Milt Holland – percussion, drums
- Jim Horn – alto flute, recorder, flute
- George Tipton – orchestration, string & woodwind arrangements
- Perry Botkin Jr. – arrangements
- Uncredited – organ on "California Dreamin'"

Technical

- Rick Jarrard – producer
- Dick Bogert – recording engineer
- George Bartell – cover illustration
- Recorded at RCA Victor's Music Center Of The World, Hollywood, California on November 21, 1967 and January 5 & 6, 1968

== Chart performance ==
Chart performance for Feliciano!
Chart (1968–1969)	Peak position
Australian Albums (Go-Set)	2
Canada Top Albums/CDs (RPM)	1
Norwegian Albums (VG-lista)	9
UK Albums (Official Charts)	6
US Billboard 200	2
US Top R&B/Hip-Hop Albums (Billboard)	3
US Top Jazz Albums (Billboard)	3
US Cashbox Top Albums	1

== Certifications ==
Certifications for Feliciano!
Region	Certification	Certified units/sales
United States (RIAA)	Gold	500,000^{^}
^{^} Shipments figures based on certification alone.
