= Fireworks (José Feliciano album) =

Studio album by José Feliciano
- Released: June 1970
- Recorded: December 21, 1969 – April 1970
- Studios: RCA's Music Center of the World, Hollywood, California
- Genres: Pop, soft rock, Latin, jazz
- Length: 36:32
- Label: RCA Victor
- Producer: Rick Jarrard

José Feliciano chronology
Feliciano/10to23 (1969)	Fireworks (1970)	José Feliciano (Feliz Navidad) (1970)

Professional ratings
Review scores
Source	Rating
AllMusic	4.5/5 stars

Fireworks is the twelfth studio album by Puerto Rican guitarist José Feliciano. Most of the tracks are acoustic cover versions and instrumentals of songs popularized by other artists, including The Beatles, Rolling Stones, Creedence Clearwater Revival, added by four songs write by himself and a guitar arrangements and recording of a classical composition by Georg Friedrich Händel.

Fireworks! was the last LP produced with Rick Jarrard, who had produced the previous four successful and Gold LPs by Feliciano. The album reached the top ten on the album charts of such countries as Spain, Australia and South East and Italy.

== Track listing ==
Side one

1. "Fireworks (From Handel's "Fireworks Suite")" (G.F. Haendel) – 2:07
2. "Destiny" (Jose Feliciano) – 2:28
3. "(I Can't Get No) Satisfaction" (Mick Jagger, Keith Richards) – 3:18
4. "Norwegian Wood" (instrumental) (John Lennon, Paul McCartney) – 4:32
5. "She Came In Through The Bathroom Window" (John Lennon, Paul McCartney) – 3:18

Side two

1. "Pegao" (Jose Feliciano) – 2:45
2. "Once There Was A Love" (Jose Feliciano, Rick Jarrard) – 3:23
3. "Blackbird" (John Lennon, Paul McCartney) – 2:23
4. "Susie-Q" (Hawkins, Broadwater, Lewis) – 5:14
5. "Yesterday" (instrumental) (John Lennon, Paul McCartney) – 2:57
6. "Let It Be" (John Lennon, Paul McCartney) – 4:00

== Personnel ==
- José Feliciano – classical guitar, vocals, electric guitar, bass, arrangements
- Paulinho Magalhaes – percussion, drums
- George Tipton – orchestration, string & woodwind arrangements
- Perry Botkin Jr. – arrangements
- Al Capps – arrangements

Technical

- Rick Jarrard – producer
- Mickey Crofford – recording engineer
- Recorded at RCA Victor's Music Center Of The World, Hollywood, California, in November 1969 and April 1970

== Chart performance ==
Chart performance for Fireworks
Chart (1970)	Peak position
Australian Albums (Go-Set)	11
Canada Top Albums/CDs (RPM)	32
UK Albums (Official Charts)	65
US Billboard 200	57
Spanish Albums (Promusicae)	1
Italian Albums (FIMI)	10
Portuguese Albums (AFP)	4
