= Feliz Navidad (José Feliciano album) =

José Feliciano (Feliz Navidad)
- Original cover

Studio album by José Feliciano
- Released: November 1970
- Recorded: August–October 1970
- Genres: Christmas, pop, jazz
- Length: 36:52
- Label: RCA Victor
- Producer: Rick Jarrard

José Feliciano chronology
Fireworks (1970)	José Feliciano (Feliz Navidad) (1970)	That the Spirit Needs (1971)

Professional ratings
Review scores
Source	Rating
AllMusic	link

Feliz Navidad is the thirteenth studio album and a Christmas album by Puerto Rican singer/songwriter José Feliciano. Originally titled José Feliciano and released in 1970 on vinyl record, 8-track tape & cassette tape by RCA Victor, it was reissued on CD in 1989 by RCA/BMG Heritage with all the songs of the original album (Christmas classics and Feliciano's famous composition "Feliz Navidad") plus three original songs added and recorded by Feliciano but never released on the original vinyl album ("Las Posadas", "Santa Claus Is Coming To Town" and "O Come All Ye Faithful").

Each year at Christmas time, this CD is on the BMG music catalog, and the song "Feliz Navidad" has become one of the most downloaded and aired Christmas songs in the US, awarded by ASCAP as one of the top 25 Christmas songs most played and recorded around the world.

== Track listing ==
1. "Feliz Navidad"
2. "Jingle Bells" (Instrumental)
3. "The Christmas Song"
4. "The First Noel" (Instrumental)
5. "The Cherry Tree Carol"
6. "The Little Drummer Boy"
7. "White Christmas" (Instrumental)
8. "We Three Kings Of Orient Are" (Instrumental)
9. "Mary's Little Boy Child"
10. "It Came Upon a Midnight Clear" (Instrumental)
11. "Silent Night"
12. "Hark, The Herald Angels Sing" (Instrumental)

Bonus Tracks 2002 edition:

1. "Las Posadas"
2. "Santa Claus Is Coming to Town" (Instrumental)
3. "O Come All Ye Faithful" (Instrumental)

== Charts ==
Chart performance for Feliz Navidad
Chart (1970–2026)	Peak position
Canadian Albums (Billboard)	29
German Albums (Offizielle Top 100)	41
US Billboard 200	34
US Top Holiday Albums (Billboard)	18
