= Me Enamoré (album) =

Studio album by José Feliciano
- Released: 1983
- Genres: Latin music, Latin rock
- Length: 41:32
- Language: Spanish
- Label: Universal Music Latino
- Producers: Leonardo Schultz, José Feliciano

José Feliciano chronology
Romance in the Night (1983)	Me Enamoré (1983)	Como Tú Quieres (1984)

Professional ratings
Review scores
Source	Rating
AllMusic	2/5 stars

Me Enamoré is the twenty-eighth studio album recorded by Puerto-Rican American singer-songwriter José Feliciano. It was produced by Leonardo Shultz and Feliciano, mixed by Tom Greto, Gary H. Mason and Shultz, mastered by John Matousek, and released in 1983. The album won Feliciano a Grammy Award for Best Latin Pop Performance in 1984.

== Track listing ==
No.	Title	Writer(s)	Length
1.	"Ay Cariño"	Leonardo Shultz	3:39
2.	"Me Enamoré"	Shultz	4:10
3.	"No Quiero Perder Tu Amor También"	Charles Fox, Norman Gimbel	3:47
4.	"Todo Volvió a Comenzar"	Shultz	4:09
5.	"Los Sonidos del Silencio (The Sound of Silence)"	Paul Simon	5:08
6.	"Paso la Vida Pensando"	José Feliciano, Shultz	3:50
7.	"Eterno Amor (Endless Love)" (featuring Ann Kelley)	Lionel Richie	4:40
8.	"Quiero Estar a Tu Lado"	Raúl Abramzon, Shultz	4:06
9.	"Qué Quieres Tú de Mi"	Jair Amorim, Manolo Silva, Evaldo Gouveia	3:35
10.	"El Cóndor Pasa"	Jorge Milchberg, Daniel Alomía Robles, Simon	4:28
