= Danube Park =

Park in Novi Sad, Serbia

Coordinates: 45.25528°N 19.85114°E

Danube Park or Dunavski Park (Serbian: Дунавски парк) is an urban park in the downtown of Novi Sad, the capital of the Vojvodina Province, Serbia. Formed in 1895, it is protected as the natural monument and is one of the symbols of the city.

== Location ==
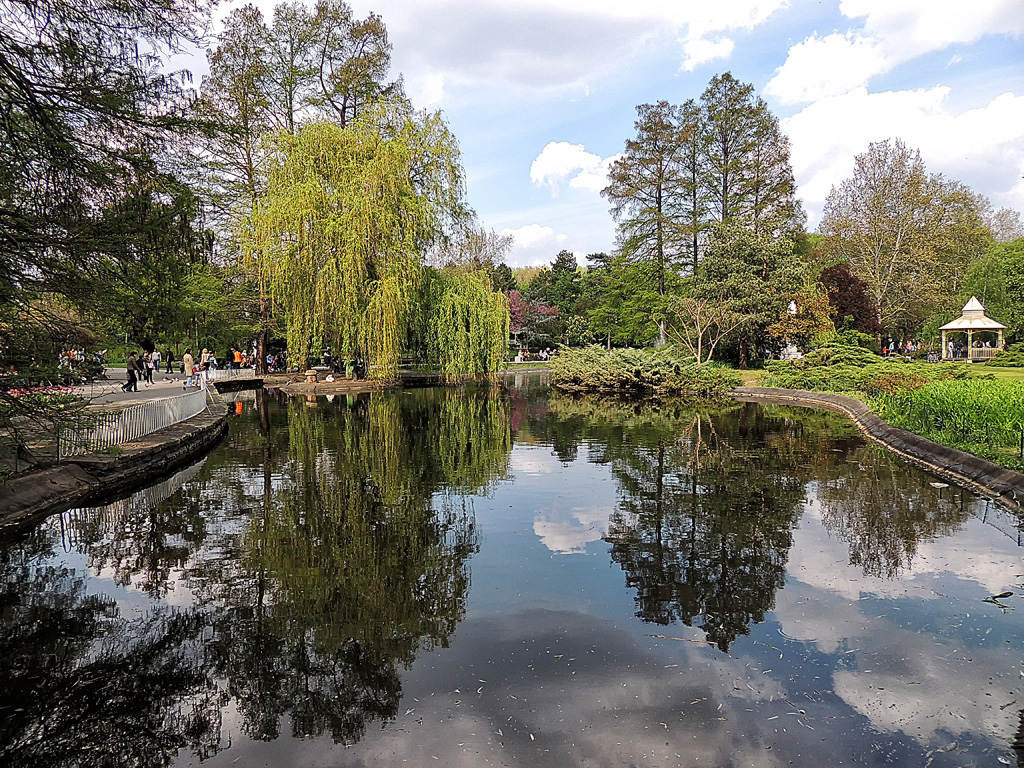
View of lake

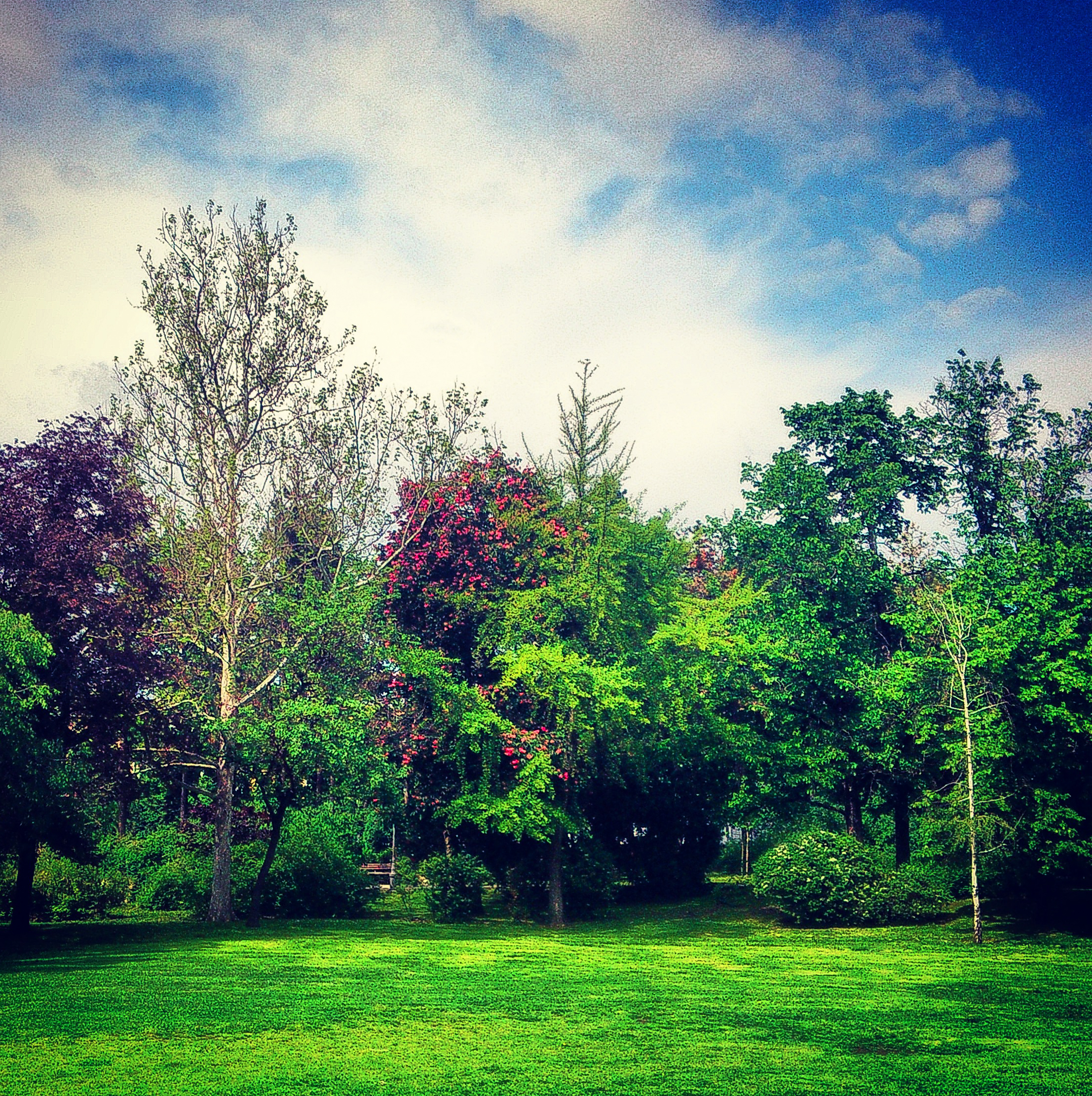
Lush, diverse vegetation

The park is located in the city's central neighborhood of Stari Grad. It is bounded by the streets of Dunavska on the north, Ive Lole Ribara on the east, Bulevar Mihajla Pupina on the south, Pionirska on the southwest and Ignjata Pavlasa on the west. Being close to the Danube river, after passing next to the park, Bulevar Mihajla Pupina extends into the Varadin Bridge, which connects Novi Sad to Petrovaradin. Notable buildings in the vicinity include Museum of Vojvodina, Youth Theatre, Vojvodina's Museum of the contemporary arts, Museum of Novi Sad and Archive of Vojvodina.

== Name ==
The name of the park, Dunavski park, means the Danube park. However, though near the river, the park was named after the Dunavska ulica ("Danube Street"), which encircles it on the north.

== History ==
=== Origin ===
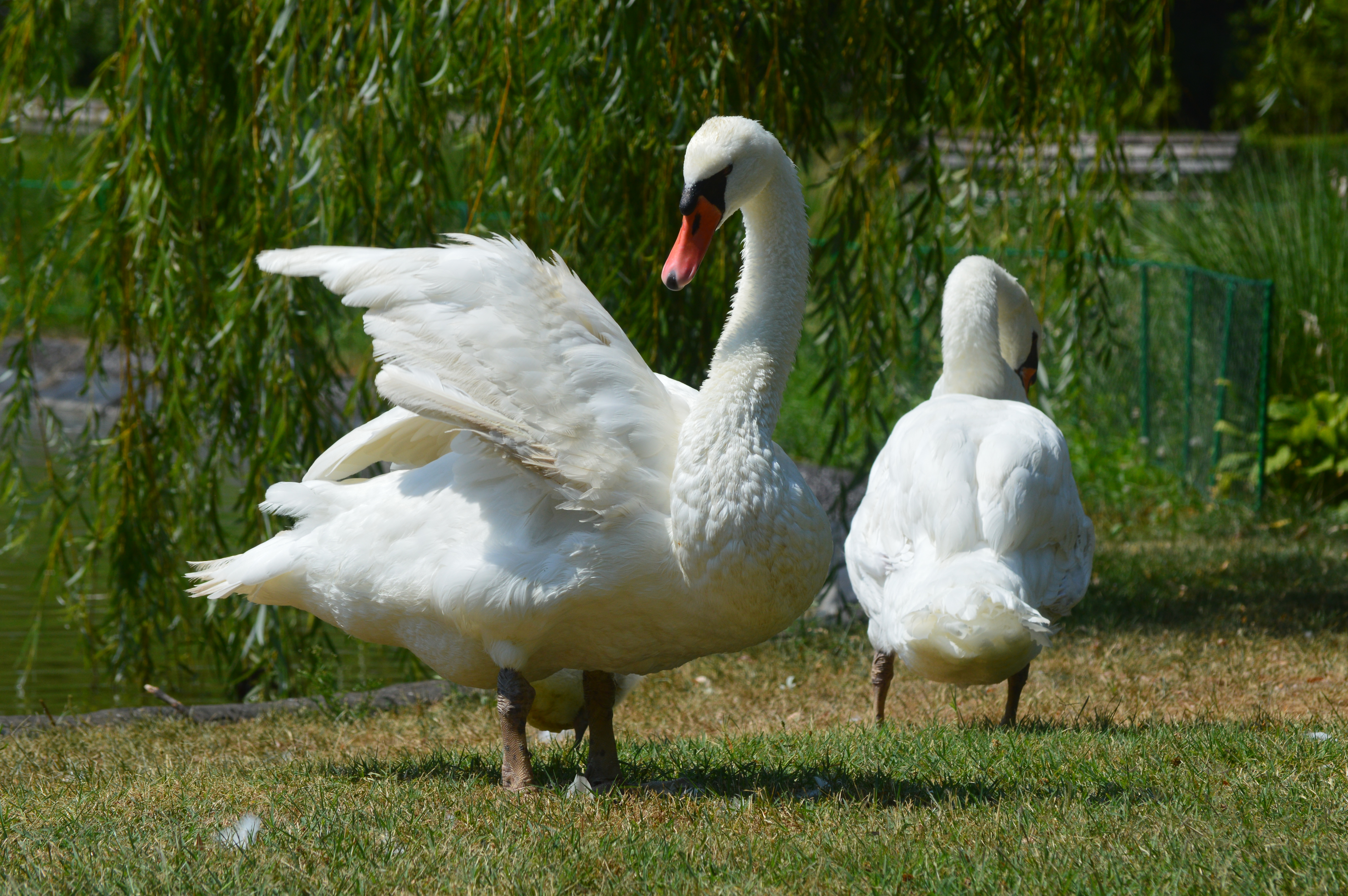
Swans Isa and Bisa

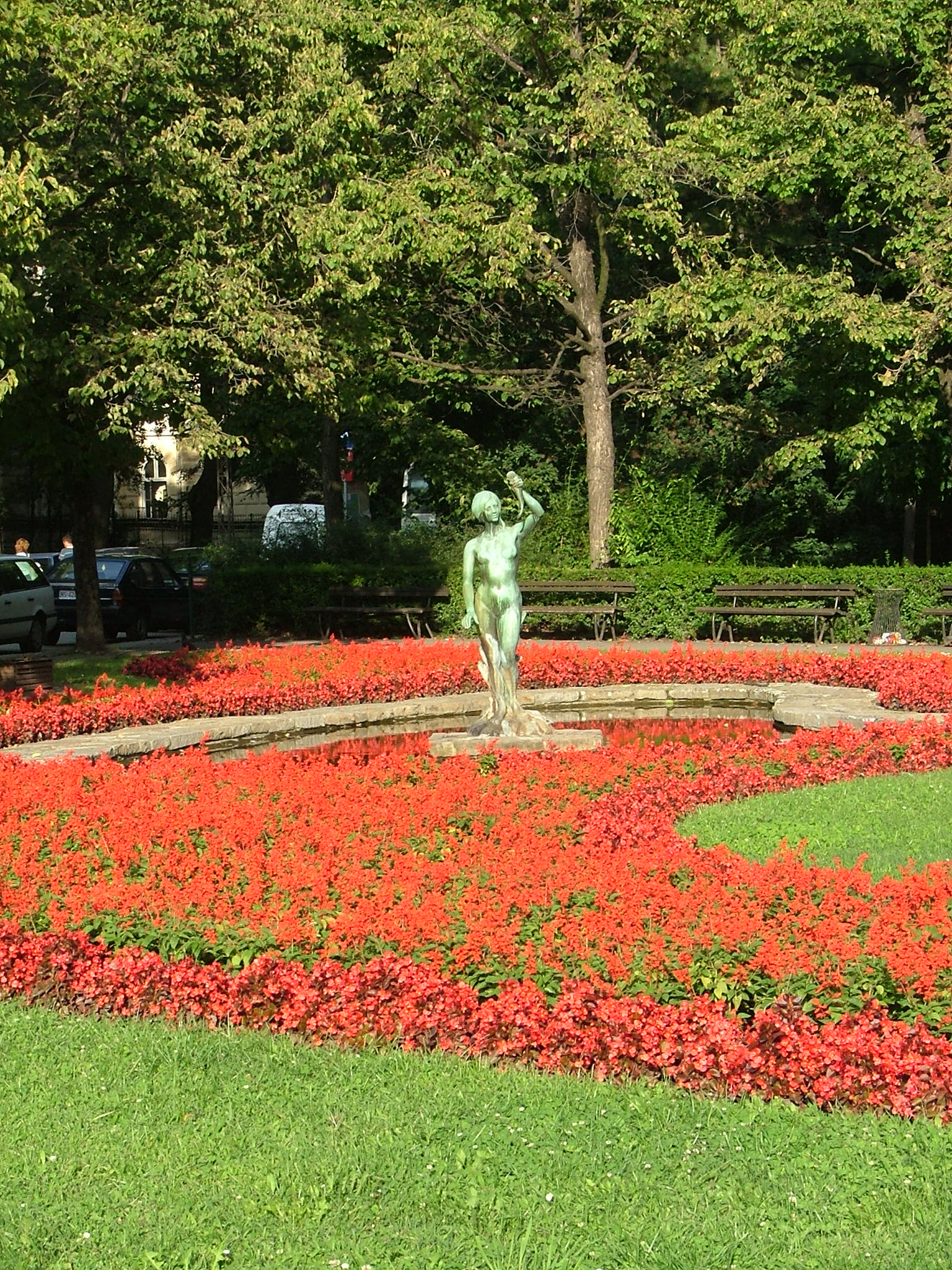
The Nymph

In the 19th century, the area of modern park was an arm of the Danube, or liman. Neighborhood south of the park, and former municipality of Novi Sad, is called Liman today. The area was a proper, large bog, known for the abundance of reeds, willows, mosquitos and frogs. Additionally, the entire locality was lower than the surrounding land, as the earth was dug and used for the construction of the embankment on the Danube's left bank (Mostobran), across the Petrovaradin Fortress. Some paintings from the period show boats navigating through the bog.

=== Park ===
In 1895 it was decided that a park will be formed instead of a bog. The filling of the marsh began that same year, in the extension of the Dunavska Street. The street itself is today differently positioned as a result, and first a walkway was formed, which became the most popular one in Novi Sad, known simply as Promenada. The muddy and sandy watery depression was covered with earth, leaving a small body of water which was bricked and turned into a lake. A small island remained in the lake. It was named Eržebet, after the Empress Elisabeth of Austria, empress consort of Austria-Hungary. When she was assassinated in 1898, a weeping willow was planted in her honor on the island. The lake was formed on an altitude of 76 m (249 ft). The lake and the island are today simply called Jezero and Ostrvce, meaning "lake" and "islet".

Photographs from 1900 show people skating on the lake. The thorough arrangement of the park began in the early 1900s. The kafana Kod engleske kraljice ("Chez Queen of England") was demolished and a building of the court was built, which today hosts the Museum of Vojvodina. The grass was planted, so as new trees and the earth pathways were placed throughout the park. First sculpture, the Nymph (officially, The girl with a cornucopia, work of Đorđe Jovanović), was erected in 1912. The park was further arranged in the 1920s and 1930s.

The park was also originally named Promenada. In the mid-1930s the filling of the swamp was finally completed, so as the completion of the pathways and the park was renamed to Danube Park. The park was refurbished from 1958 to 1962, on the project of Ratibor Đorđević, when it was shaped in the form in which it exists today. All the sick and dried trees were removed and flower arrangements were introduced. Another major reconstruction occurred in 1978. When the Marshall Tito Boulevard was constructed in 1963 (modern Liberation Boulevard), the old Armenian Church was demolished as it was blocking the route. The façade fragments were used for paving some of the pathways in the park.

Due to the seasonal skating rink which has been placed during the winter since the late 2010s, the officials used a moniker Frozen Forest for the park, for marketing purposes. By the early 2020s, there were 640 trees in the park. A massive, over €1 million reconstruction was announced for spring-autumn 2022.

== Wildlife ==
=== Plant life ===
There are over 600 individual trees and 7,000 decorative plants in the park, with 250 different plant species. Deciduous trees include plane trees (as of 2017, some are over 100 years old), Lombardy poplar, silver linden, European nettle tree, hazelnut, birch, maple, horse-chestnut and penduculate oak, which is under protection, while evergreen trees are black pine, thuja, cypress, fir. Decorative plants include white poplar, pond cypress, cherry plum, Turkish hazel, pyramidal oak and numerous shrubs (common box, Maule's quince, common barberry, European cornel).

The vegetation in park is exceptionally lush compared to the other parks in Serbia and it is not known why the trees and plants thrive more than in other similar places. The flowers, like Aztec marigold or African arrowroot last long into the autumn. The ground is wet, so one of the possible explanations is the closeness of the Danube and a fact that the land used to be a swamp.

=== Animal life ===
The lake is mostly inhabited by ducks. For a long time, a symbol of the park was a couple of swans, called Isa and Bisa. Their offspring were attacked in 2015 by the red-eared sliders, which were probably released in the lake by their owners who kept them as pets. One chick was killed and two others had their wings bitten off, one wing each. However, some experts thought that the turtles couldn't do that. Still, the lake was emptied, all sliders were removed and transferred to the Lake Palić, and only the European pond turtles which are harmless for the birds, were kept.

== Characteristics ==
The park covers an area of 3.96 ha (9.8 acres), of which green area occupy 2.2 ha (5.4 acres).

Apart from the Nymph, there are several other sculptures in the park. Busts of poets Branko Radičević (by Ivanka Acin; 1953) and Miroslav Antić (by Pavle Radovanović; 1992), bronze monument to poet and painter Đura Jakšić (by Jovan Soldatović; 1990) and a monument to the Venerable Sergius of Radonezh (by Vyacheslav Kulikov; 1992). There was another sculpture by Soldatović in the park, the "Roe deer", but it was transferred to the military complex and hunting ground of Karađorđevo later. There are also a drinking fountain and the small fountain.

A white gazebo (saletla) was constructed in the park. It hosts the smaller concerts and shows, literary evenings and exhibitions. Almost all newlyweds have photo sessions in the park and in front of the gazebo.

In 1998, government of the Republic of Serbia declared the Danube Park a natural monument of the II category and placed it under protection.
