= Romance in the Night =

1983 studio album by José Feliciano

Studio album by José Feliciano
- Released: 1983
- Recorded: 1982–1983
- Studio: Evergreen Studios
- Genres: Pop, soft rock
- Length: 40:06
- Label: Motown 6035ML
- Producers: Rick Jarrard & José Feliciano

José Feliciano chronology
Escenas de Amor (1982)	Romance in the Night (1983)	Me Enamoré (1983)

Professional ratings
Review scores
Source	Rating
AllMusic	2/5 stars

Romance in the Night is the twenty-seventh studio album by Puerto Rican guitarist José Feliciano, consisting of six covers and four Feliciano originals. It was released after Rick Jarrard's return to Motown in 1983. The track "Let’s Find Each Other Tonight” (a Feliciano original) was his first single to make the Country charts and was performed live in the 1996 movie Fargo by the Coen brothers.

== Track listing ==
Side One:

1. ”Lonely Teardrops” (Berry Gordy, Tyran Carlo, Gwendolyn Gordy) 4:20
2. ”If You Have a Heart” (José Feliciano) 3:25
3. ”Taking it All in Stride” (Tom Snow) 4:13
4. ”Let’s Find Each Other Tonight” (José Feliciano) 3:45
5. ”One Night” (Dave Bartholomew, Pearl King) 2:51

Side Two:

1. ”So Into You” (Robert Nix, Dean Daughtry, Buddy Buie) 4:05
2. ”Play Me” (Neil Diamond) 4:18
3. ”I Feel Fine” (John Lennon, Paul McCartney) 3:18
4. ”¡Cuidado!” (instrumental) (José Feliciano, David Witham) 4:13
5. ”Romance in the Night” (José Feliciano) 5:48

== Personnel ==
- José Feliciano: Vocals, all acoustic and electric guitars, vocal harmonies, bass, "Bass on Big Finish" (title track), harmonica, tambourine and percussion
- J.D. Maness: Steel guitar on "If You Have a Heart"
- Glen D. Hardin: Fender Rhodes, acoustic piano
- David Witham: Fender Rhodes
- Michael Fisher: Acoustic piano, percussion
- Rick Jarrard: Synthesizers
- Emory Gordy Jr.: Bass, mandolin, additional synthesizers
- Willie Ornelas: Drums

== Production ==
- Arranged and produced by Rick Jarrard & José Feliciano
- Recording engineers: Dick Bogert & Ellis Sorkin
- Mixing engineer: Dick Bogert
- Mastering engineer: Bernie Grundman
- Art Direction: Johnny Lee
- Design: Terry Taylor
- Photography: Ron Slenzak
