= Feliciano/10 to 23 =

Feliciano/10to23

Studio album by José Feliciano
- Released: June 1969
- Recorded: January 1969 – April 1969
- Studios: RCA's Music Center of the World, Hollywood, California
- Genres: Pop, soft rock, latin, bossa nova
- Length: 41:09
- Label: RCA Victor
- Producer: Rick Jarrard

José Feliciano chronology
Souled (1968)	Feliciano/10to23 (1969)	Alive Alive-O! (1969)

Professional ratings
Review scores
Source	Rating
AllMusic	4.5/5 stars

Feliciano/10to23 is the eleventh studio album by Puerto Rican guitarist José Feliciano. Many of the tracks are acoustic cover versions of songs popularized by other artists, including Bee Gees, Cole Porter and The Beatles with some instrumentals played with classical guitar with jazz influenced.

Feliciano 10to23 has been the second most successful album of his career in the US, peaking at number 16 on Billboard Top LP chart (number 54 on the end-of-year chart for 1969); it also reached number 15 on the R&B charts. The album performed well outside the US, reaching number 8 in Canada and number 2 in Australia. The single Rain reached number 57 in Canada September 13, 1969.

== Track listing ==
Side one

1. "Amor Jibaro" (Cruz) – 2:35
2. "First Of May" (R. Gibb, M. Gibb, B. Gibb) – 3:55
3. "The Windmills Of Your Mind" (Bergman-Bergman, LeGrand) – 3:50
4. "By The Time I Get To Phoenix" (instrumental) (Jimmy Webb) – 3:11
5. "Miss Otis Regrets" (Cole Porter) – 3:47
6. "Little Red Rooster" (Dixon) – 5:25

Side two

1. "She's A Woman" (Lennon, McCartney) – 5:12
2. "Lady Madonna" (instrumental) (Lennon, McCartney) – 1:45
3. "Rain" (Jose Feliciano) – 2:58
4. "I've Gotta Get a Message to You" (R. Gibb, M. Gibb, B. Gibb) – 3:09
5. "Hey Jude" (Lennon, McCartney) – 8:05

== Personnel ==
- Guitars, percussion: José Feliciano
- Bass guitar: Larry Knechtel
- Keyboards: Mike Melvoin
- Drums: Hal Blaine, Jim Gordon, Milt Holland, Earl Palmer
- Percussion: Victor Feldman
- Flute: Jim Horn
- Strings: Ray Brown, Al Capps, Gayle Levant

== Chart performance ==
Chart performance for Feliciano 10to23
Chart (1969/70)	Peak position
Australian Albums (ARIA Charts)	2
Canada Top Albums/CDs (RPM)	8
Dutch Albums (Album Top 100)	8
Norwegian Albums (VG-lista)	4
Spanish Albums (Promusicae)	4
UK Albums (Official Charts)	38
US Billboard 200	16
US Top R&B/Hip-Hop Albums (Billboard)	15
US Cashbox Top Albums	11

== Certifications ==
Certifications for Feliciano 10to23
Region	Certification	Certified units/sales
United States (RIAA)	Gold	500,000^{^}
^{^} Shipments figures based on certification alone.
