= Millennial Choirs & Orchestras =

Musical organization

- Choir
- Origin: Orange County, California, U.S.
- Founded: 2007
- Founder: Brett Stewart, Brandon Stewart
- Genre: Worship, classical, gospel
- Members: 5,000+
- Music director: Brett Stewart, Brandon Stewart, Joni Jensen, Jodi Reed, Emily Cook, Christina Bishop
- Website: millennial.org

Millennial Choirs & Orchestras (MCO) is an American musical organization that was founded in 2007 for the purpose of teaching sacred and classical music, especially to its youth. The organization prioritizes in offering music performance education, with a focus on the works and styles of classical composers.

== Organization ==
MCO was founded in 2007 by brothers and musicians Dr. Brett Stewart and Brandon Stewart. The organization's artistic staff also includes the following musical directors: Dr. Joni Jensen, Dr. Jodi Reed, Emily Cook, and Christina Bishop. MCO operates under the parent organization Millennial Music, which is a private 501(c)(3) nonprofit organization. Annually, more than 5,000 individuals participate in MCO. MCO has seven locations: California (Orange County), Arizona (East Valley), Texas-Dallas, Texas-Austin, Utah (Wasatch Front), Idaho (Treasure Valley), and Missouri (Kansas City). Each location comprises four youth choirs, an adult choir, and a symphony orchestra.

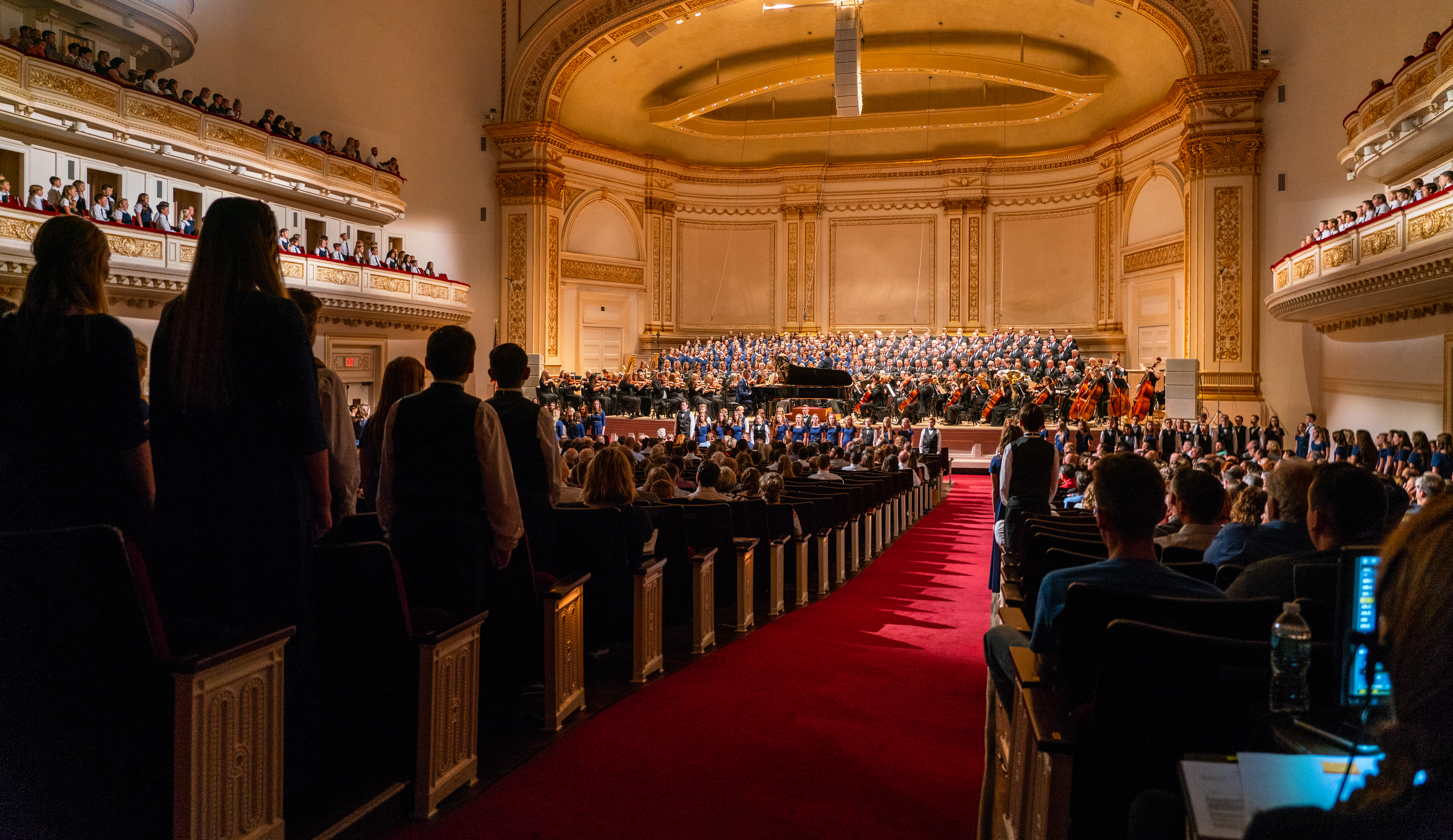
MCO performing in historic Carnegie Hall in NYC, NY, on July 13, 2019

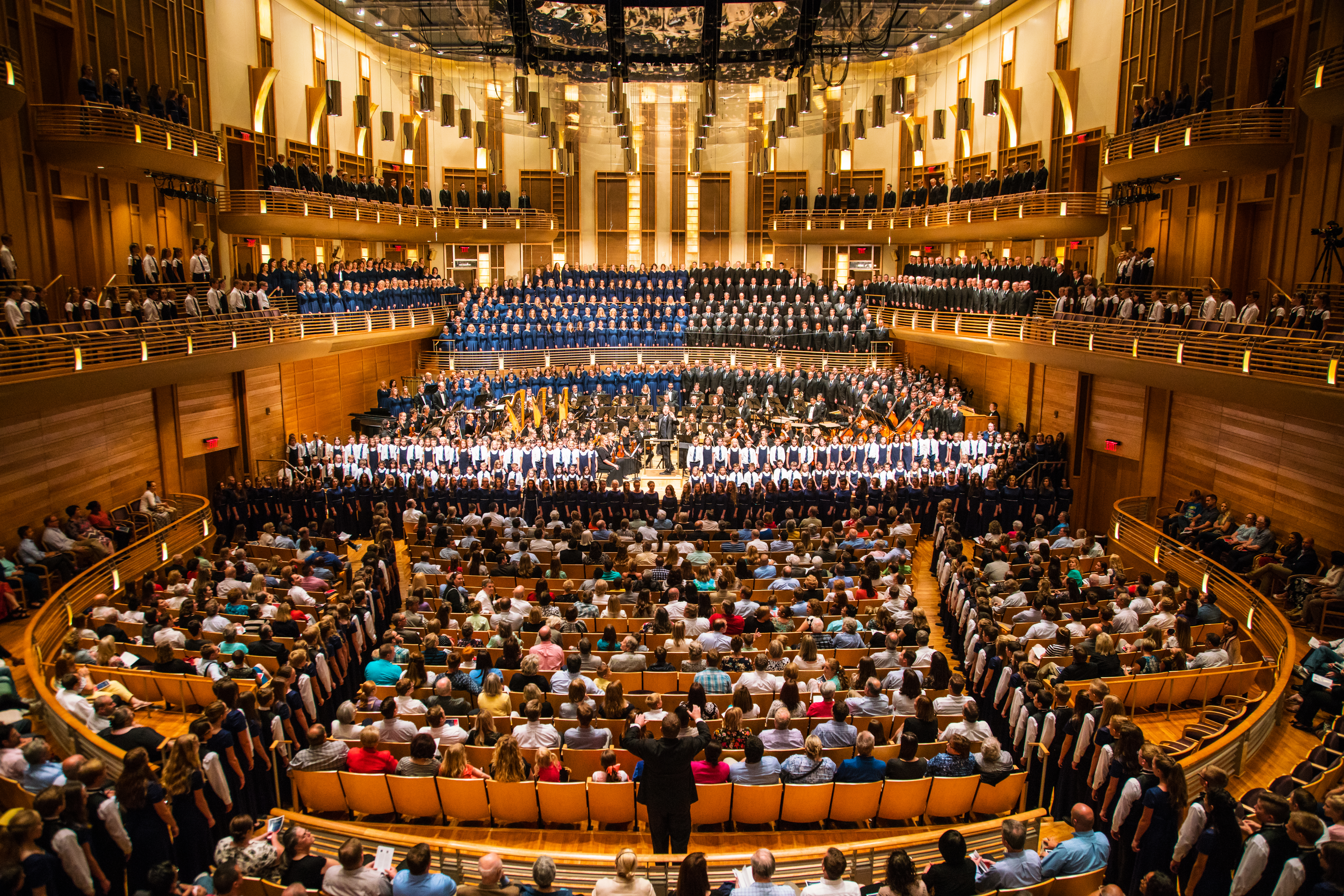
MCO performing in The Music Center at Strathmore in North Bethesda, MD, on June 24, 2016

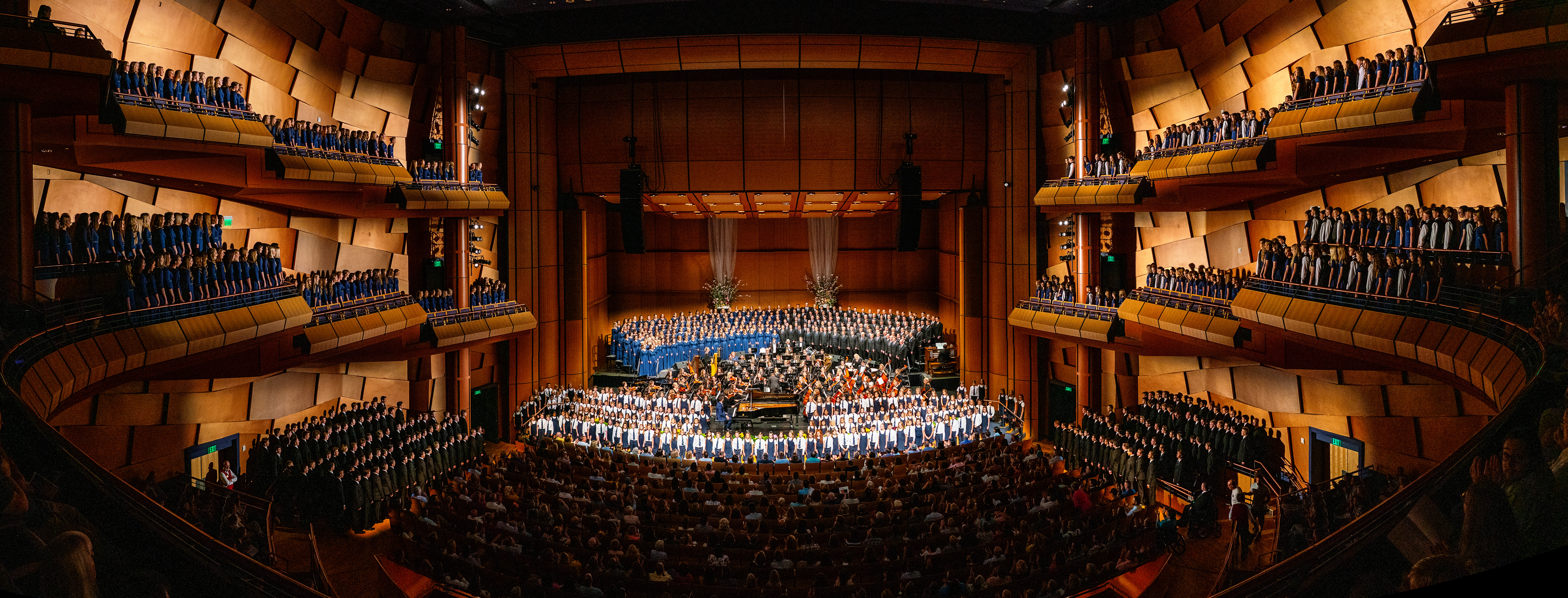
Arizona MCO performing at the Mesa Arts Center in April 2019

The choirs of MCO consist of singers ranging from age four through adult. The ensembles are constructed as follows:

- Symphony Orchestra: Advanced instrumentalists (auditioned)
- Grand Chorus: Advanced adult men and women singers (18+, auditioned)
- Concert Choir: High school-aged (9th–12th grade)
- Youth Chorus: Middle school–aged (6th–8th grade)
- Children’s Chorus: Elementary school–aged (2nd–5th grade)
- Young Singers Chorus: Young children (age 4–1st grade)

== History ==
- Orange County Mormon Choral Organization (OCMCO) is founded in Orange County, California in the fall of 2007. The name would eventually be changed to Millennial Choirs & Orchestras.
- MCO expands to East Valley (Phoenix metropolitan area), Arizona in the fall of 2009.
- MCO releases its debut album That Easter Morn on December 1, 2009.
- MCO releases its second album Messiah in America on December 13, 2011.
- MCO releases its third album O Holy Night, also their first Christmas album, on November 6, 2012.
- In March 2013, MCO was invited to perform at the National Conference of the American Choral Directors Association (ACDA) in the Meyerson Symphony Center in Dallas, Texas.
- MCO expands to Dallas, Texas and Salt Lake County/Utah County, Utah in the fall of 2013.
- MCO releases single "How Great Thou Art" on November 12, 2013.
- MCO releases its fourth album To Be American on July 1, 2014.
- MCO expands to the Boise, Idaho region in the fall of 2015.
- In June 2016, participants from MCO's five locales participated in its "God & Country Tour" to Washington, D.C.
- MCO releases Amazing Grace, its fifth album on October 28, 2016.
- In June 2017, participants from MCO's five locales performed and recorded selections from their Be Still, My Soul concert repertoire in the Salt Lake Tabernacle at Temple Square in Salt Lake City, Utah.
- MCO releases singles "Far, Far Away on Judea's Plains" and "O Come, O Come, Emmanuel" on December 22, 2017.
- On July 12–13, 2019, participants from MCO's five locales performed two concerts with selections from their Nearer, My God, To Thee concert repertoire at Carnegie Hall in New York, New York, featuring soloists Jenny Oaks Baker (violinist) and Erin Morley (soprano). The third concert, which included participants from California and Utah, was cancelled due to the Manhattan blackout of July 2019.
- MCO releases single "Be Still, My Soul" on July 31, 2019.
- MCO releases Millennial Song, its sixth album, on October 25, 2019.
- MCO releases Star of Wonder, its seventh album, on December 16, 2020.
- MCO releases single "Gloria" on December 29, 2020.
- MCO expands to Austin, Texas and Davis County, Utah in August 2021.
- MCO releases God Is Marching On, its eighth album, on August 20, 2021.
- MCO releases single "Green Hill Far Away" on April 15, 2022.
- In June 2022, MCO youth participants gathered to perform in the iconic Christ Cathedral in Garden Grove, California.
- MCO releases single "Infant Holy, Infant Lowly" on December 15, 2022.
- MCO expands to Kansas City in August 2023.
- MCO releases single "A Mighty Fortress" on October 13, 2023.
- In June 2024, MCO participants from across the country performed in the renowned Boston Symphony Hall in Boston, Massachusetts.
- MCO releases single "The Vision" on July 23, 2024.
- MCO releases single "O Holy Night" on December 24, 2024.

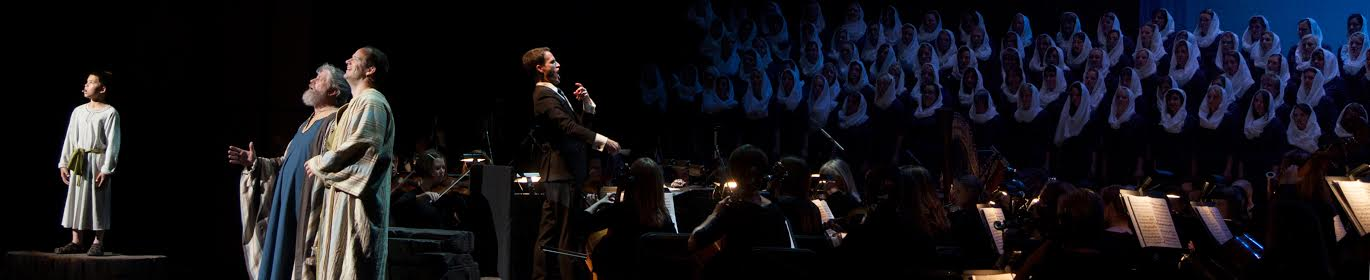
MCO performing a staged production of Mendelssohn's Elijah in their "Deliver Us" concert at Arizona's Mesa Arts Center, 2015

== Discography ==
=== Albums ===
Year	Album name	# of tracks
2009	That Easter Morn	13
2011	Messiah in America	22
2012	O Holy Night	15
2014	To Be American	14
2016	Amazing Grace	10
2019	Millennial Song	8
2020	Star of Wonder	12
2021	God Is Marching On	9

=== Singles ===
Year	Track name
2013	Amazing Grace
2017	Far, Far Away on Judea's Plains
2017	O Come, O Come, Emmanuel
2019	Be Still My Soul
2022	Green Hill Far Away
2022	Infant Holy, Infant Lowly
2023	A Mighty Fortress
2024	The Vision
2024	O Holy Night
