= Jed Babbin =

American politician, writer and commentator

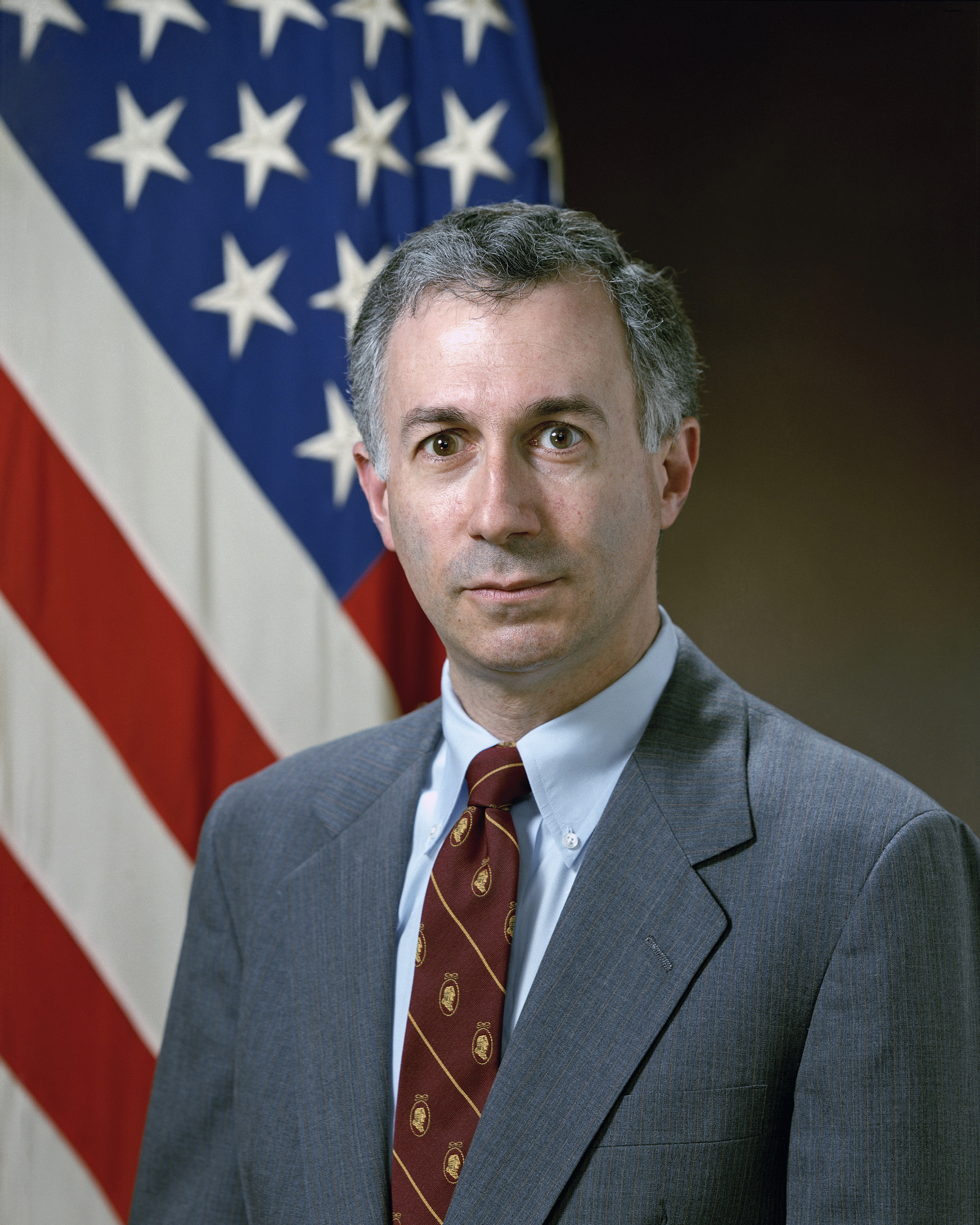

Deputy Under Secretary of Defense for Acquisition Planning
- In office January 1990 – April 1991
- President: George H. W. Bush
- Secretary: Dick Cheney; John A. Betti (Asst. Secretary); Donald J. Yockey (Acting Asst. Secretary)

Personal details
- Born: Jed Lloyd Babbin; March 16, 1950 (age 76) New York City, U.S.
- Spouse: Sharon
- Education: Stevens Institute of Technology (BS); Samford University (JD); Georgetown University (LLM)

Military service
- Branch/service: United States Air Force
- Years of service: 1973-1977
- Rank: Captain
- Unit: J.A.G. Corps

Jed Lloyd Babbin (born March 16, 1950) is an American lawyer, writer, and former United States Deputy Undersecretary of Defense who served during the first Bush administration. He is the author of the political books Inside the Asylum, Showdown, and In the Words of Our Enemies.

== Biography ==
Born in New York City, New York, Babbin graduated from Stevens Institute of Technology with a Bachelor of Science degree in 1970 and from Cumberland School of Law with a Juris Doctor in 1973. He also graduated from the Georgetown University Law Center with a Master of Laws in 1978.

From 1973 to 1977 he served in the United States Air Force as a judge advocate. He served on active duty assigned to the Sacramento Air Logistics Center at McClellan Air Force Base in California and later the Civil Litigation Division of the Air Force at the Pentagon in Virginia. He left the military as a Captain.

From 1977 to 1981 he was an associate with McKenna, Conner & Cuneo. From 1981 to 1985 he was the Vice President and General Counsel of the Shipbuilders Council of America. From 1985 to 1990 he was the Director of Contract Policy for the Lockheed Corporation. From 1990 to 1991 he served as the Deputy Under Secretary of Defense for Acquisition Planning at the Pentagon during the presidency of George H. W. Bush. From 1991 to 1994 he was a partner with McGuire, Woods, Battle & Boothe. From 1994 to 2001 he was a partner with Tighe, Patton & Babbin, LLC.

After that he was a partner at O'Connor & Hannan, LLP in Washington, D.C., and later an editor and online editor for the conservative magazine Human Events.

He is a political commentator and contributing editor to The American Spectator, National Review Online, and The Washington Times. He is also a frequent guest host on Talk Radio WMET in Washington, D.C.

Babbin is an ardent detractor of what he describes as the "527 Media," which he considers to be composed of The New York Times, The Washington Post, ABC, CBS and NBC. He alleges such outlets are little more than an extension of the Democratic National Committee and charges that they willfully distort truth to pursue their own agenda. He argues that the only way to disrupt what he sees as the 527 Media's "narrative" is for elected Republican officials to tell the "truth" about current situations (such as the Iraq War) without it being passed through what he sees as the filter of the 527 Media.

== Radio appearances ==
He guest-hosted the following radio shows:

- The Rush Limbaugh Show on July 17, 2008
- The Mark Levin Show on August 10, 2009
- The Roger Hedgecock Show on April 21, 2010
- The Savage Nation, on August 11 and 17, 2011, and on January 23, February 1, June 15, and June 27, 2012.
