= Record World =

1946–1982 US music industry trade magazine

- First page of the August 13, 1966 issue
- Categories: Music
- Founded: 1946
- Final issue: April 10, 1982
- Country: United States
- Based in: New York City
- Language: English
- ISSN: 0034-1622

Record World magazine was one of three major weekly music industry trade magazines in the United States, with Billboard and Cashbox. It was founded in 1946 as Music Vendor. In 1964, it was changed to Record World under the ownership of Sid Parnes and Bob Austin. It ceased publication on April 10, 1982.

== History ==
=== Growth ===
Music Vendor published its first music chart for the week ending October 4, 1954.

Record World was housed in New York City at 1700 Broadway, at 53rd Street, across the street from the Ed Sullivan Theater. Its West Coast editorial offices were located in Los Angeles on Sunset and Vine.

=== Peak ===
Record World showed musical diversity by printing a "Non-Rock" survey, comparable to Billboard's "Easy Listening" / "Adult Contemporary" chart. This chart began in the February 4, 1967, issue, with the first No. 1 being Ed Ames' "My Cup Runneth Over". The chart ended on April 1, 1972, having morphed to the name "The MOR Chart" by 1971. Several titles of interest appeared on this 40-position list without making the Billboard Easy Listening survey. The chart returned with a weekly top-50 "A/C Chart" on February 16, 1980. Record World initiated first annual jazz award in 1968.

=== Contributors ===
Staffers included Mike Sigman, editor-in-chief (who then went on to become publisher of the LA Weekly); Howie Levitt, managing editor (later of Billboard and BMI, the music royalty service); Pat Baird, who went on to key publicity positions at both RCA and BMI; associate editor Allen Levy, who went to become a public relations person for United Artists Records, ASCAP and A&M, and who is now a professor of mass communication at Chapman University.

==== Dede Dabney ====
Dede Dabney was from Philadelphia. She, the daughter of a pharmacist, came on board in 1972. She had a weekly column called "Soul Truth". She communicated weekly by phone to major figures in radio programming to get and give information. These figures included Frankie Crocker of WBLS-FM, New York, E. Rodney Jones of WVON, Chicago, and Joe "Butterball" Tamburro of WDAS, Philadelphia. When an artist or group's record was mentioned in "Dede's Ditties to Watch", it was one that was watched.

==== Marie Ratliff ====
Marie Ratliff hailed from Missouri. Following a weekend visit to the Grand Ole Opry, she moved to Nashville. She started out in the music business in a part-time role, handling the mail for artists Skeeter Davis and Ralph Emery. Not too long after that role, she got a job at Key Talent and Newkeys Music as office manager. She was pictured with other Newkeys staff in the 9 July 1966 issue of Record World. She also worked with Tom T. Hall.

Later at some stage, she was employed at Record World and at some stage became the country chart manager. Her role there was selecting and maintaining the reporting panels for radio and retail. It seems that her name appeared as a columnist on 23 June 1970. It was Country Hot Line By MARIE RATLIFF & CHUCK NEESE. Prior to that the magazine didn't name the contributor.

In 1982, she was working as VP for MAF Advertising, which was the in-house publishing company for the group Alabama. In 1986, she joined the staff of Billboard as country charts manager. Her column at Billboard was called Country Corner. In 1991 she was working for Amusement Business as the manager at Boxscore / Touring database manager. By 1998 she had retired.

==== Others ====
Other staff included writers Vince Aletti (later of The New Yorker); Marc Kirkeby (he went on to CBS/Sony Records); Jeffrey Peisch (later of MTV and independent producing); Dave McGee (later of Rolling Stone); Laurie Lennard (later as a talent booker on The Late Show, then wife of comedian Larry David, and producer of Al Gore's An Inconvenient Truth); columnist Sophia Midas; chart editor and assistant editor Fred Goodman (later editor of Cash Box and current managing editor of Pro Sound News and a songwriter/music publisher; radio director Neil McIntyre; and art director David Ray Skinner, who also contributed a weekly cartoon from 1978 until the magazine's demise in 1982.

== Charts ==
=== 100 Top Pops ===
With the 11 April 1964 issue, the magazine was still called Music Vendor. The national top 100 singles chart was called Music Vendor 100 Top Pop. At some stage prior to 6 June 1964, the magazine had changed its name to Record World, and the national top 100 singles chart was called 100 Top Pops.

=== R&B ===
In 1978, Record World changed the R&B title to Black-Oriented.

== List of number-one singles ==
This is a list of all the songs that reached number one on the Music Vendor/Record World chart, obtained from the cited sources. In total, 658 songs reached number one on the chart. In the early history of the chart, multiple versions of the same song charted as one entry, so the most successful recording of these songs is listed. An asterisk (*) denotes a nonconsecutive run at number one.

"The Twist", by Chubby Checker, is the only song to hit number one in two different chart runs. The record holder for the most weeks at number one is Debby Boone's "You Light Up My Life", which stayed on top for 13 weeks. "I Love Rock 'n' Roll", by Joan Jett & the Blackhearts, was the last song to top the chart before the magazine ceased publication.

Record World number-one hits
Song	Artist/band name	Label	Chart date song reached number one	Weeks at #1
"Hey There"	Rosemary Clooney	Columbia	October 4, 1954	3
"If I Give My Heart to You"	Doris Day	Columbia	October 25, 1954	3
"I Need You Now"	Eddie Fisher	RCA Victor	November 15, 1954	1
"Papa Loves Mambo"	Perry Como	RCA Victor	November 22, 1954	1
"Mr. Sandman"	The Chordettes	Cadence	November 29, 1954	3
"Let Me Go, Lover!"	Joan Weber	Columbia	December 20, 1954	3
"Hearts of Stone"	The Fontane Sisters	Dot	January 10, 1955	6
"Sincerely"	The McGuire Sisters	Coral	February 21, 1955	5
"The Crazy Otto" (Medley)	Johnny Maddox and the Rhythmasters	Dot	March 28, 1955	3
"The Ballad of Davy Crockett"	Bill Hayes	Cadence	April 18, 1955	1
"The Wallflower (Dance with Me, Henry)"	Georgia Gibbs	Mercury	April 25, 1955	1
"Cherry Pink (and Apple Blossom White)"	Perez Prado Orchestra	RCA Victor	May 2, 1955	8
"Unchained Melody"	Les Baxter Orchestra	Capitol	June 27, 1955	3
"(We're Gonna) Rock Around the Clock"	Bill Haley & His Comets	Decca	July 18, 1955	4
"Ain't That a Shame"	Pat Boone	Dot	August 15, 1955	2
"The Yellow Rose of Texas"	Mitch Miller Orchestra	Columbia	August 29, 1955	7
"Love Is a Many-Splendored Thing"	The Four Aces	Decca	October 17, 1955	2
"Autumn Leaves"	Roger Williams	Kapp	October 31, 1955	3
"Sixteen Tons"	Tennessee Ernie Ford	Capitol	November 21, 1955	7
"Memories Are Made of This"	Dean Martin	Capitol	January 13, 1956	5
"The Great Pretender"	The Platters	Mercury	February 17, 1956	3
"Rock and Roll Waltz"	Kay Starr	RCA Victor	March 9, 1956	2
"The Poor People of Paris"	Les Baxter	Capitol	March 23, 1956	4
"Blue Suede Shoes"	Carl Perkins	Sun	April 20, 1956	1
"Heartbreak Hotel"	Elvis Presley	RCA Victor	April 27, 1956	7
"The Wayward Wind"	Gogi Grant	Era	June 15, 1956	8
"My Prayer"	The Platters	Mercury	August 10, 1956	3
"Canadian Sunset"	Hugo Winterhalter and his Orchestra	RCA Victor	September 1, 1956	1
"Don't Be Cruel"	Elvis Presley	RCA Victor]	September 8, 1956	8
"Just Walkin' in the Rain"	Johnnie Ray	Columbia	November 3, 1956	4*
"Love Me Tender"	Elvis Presley	RCA Victor	November 17, 1956	1
"Singing the Blues"	Guy Mitchell	Columbia	December 8, 1956	7
"Young Love"	Tab Hunter	Dot	January 26, 1957	7
"Marianne"	Terry Gilkyson	Columbia	March 16, 1957	2
"Butterfly"	Andy Williams	Cadence	March 30, 1957	1
"Teen-Age Crush"	Tommy Sands	Capitol	April 6, 1957	1
"Party Doll"	Buddy Knox	Roulette	April 13, 1957	1
"Little Darlin'"	The Diamonds	Mercury	April 20, 1957	1
"All Shook Up"	Elvis Presley	RCA Victor	April 27, 1957	6
"Love Letters in the Sand"	Pat Boone	Dot	June 8, 1957	7*
"Bye Bye Love"	The Everly Brothers	Cadence	July 20, 1957	1
"(Let Me Be Your) Teddy Bear"	Elvis Presley	RCA Victor	August 3, 1957	4
"Tammy"	Debbie Reynolds	Coral	August 26, 1957	3
"Diana"	Paul Anka	ABC-Paramount	September 16, 1957	3
"Honeycomb"	Jimmie Rodgers	Roulette	October 7, 1957	2
"Wake Up Little Susie"	The Everly Brothers	Cadence	October 21, 1957	5
"You Send Me"	Sam Cooke	Keen	November 25, 1957	4
"Raunchy"	Bill Justis	Phillips International	December 23, 1957	1
"At the Hop"	Danny and the Juniors	ABC-Paramount	December 30, 1957	6
"The Stroll"	The Diamonds	Mercury	February 10, 1958	2
"Sugartime"	The McGuire Sisters	Coral	February 24, 1958	1
"Catch a Falling Star"	Perry Como	RCA Victor	March 3, 1958	2
"Tequila"	The Champs	Challenge	March 17, 1958	4
"He's Got the Whole World (in His Hands)"	Laurie London	Capitol	April 14, 1958	2
"Twilight Time"	The Platters	Mercury	April 28, 1958	3
"All I Have to Do Is Dream"	The Everly Brothers	Cadence	May 19, 1958	4
"The Purple People Eater"	Sheb Wooley	MGM	June 16, 1958	3
"Yakety Yak"	The Coasters	ATCO	July 7, 1958	1
"Patricia"	Perez Prado	RCA Victor	July 14, 1958	4
"Nel Blu Dipinto Di Blu (Volare)"	Domenico Modugno	Decca	August 11, 1958	6
"It's All in the Game"	Tommy Edwards	MGM	September 22, 1958	6
"It's Only Make Believe"	Conway Twitty	MGM	November 3, 1958	3
"Tom Dooley"	The Kingston Trio	Capitol	November 24, 1958	1
"To Know Him Is to Love Him"	The Teddy Bears	Dove	December 1, 1958	3
"The Chipmunk Song (Christmas Don't Be Late)"	The Chipmunks	Liberty	December 22, 1958	3
"Smoke Gets in Your Eyes"	The Platters	Mercury	January 12, 1959	4
"Stagger Lee"	Lloyd Price	ABC-Paramount	February 9, 1959	3
"Donna"	Ritchie Valens	Del-Fi	March 2, 1959	1
"Venus"	Frankie Avalon	Chancellor	March 9, 1959	4
"Come Softly to Me"	The Fleetwoods	Dolton	April 6, 1959	3
"(Now and Then There's) A Fool Such as I"	Elvis Presley	RCA Victor	April 27, 1959	2
"The Happy Organ"	Dave "Baby" Cortez	Clock	May 11, 1959	1
"Kansas City"	Wilbert Harrison	Fury	May 18, 1959	2
"The Battle of New Orleans"	Johnny Horton	Columbia	June 1, 1959	6
"Lonely Boy"	Paul Anka	ABC-Paramount	July 13, 1959	3
"My Heart Is an Open Book"	Carl Dobkins Jr.	Decca	August 3, 1959	3
"The Three Bells"	The Browns	RCA Victor	August 24, 1959	5
"Mack the Knife"	Bobby Darin	ATCO	September 28, 1959	6
"Mr. Blue"	The Fleetwoods	Dolton	November 9, 1959	2
"Don't You Know?"	Della Reese	RCA Victor	November 23, 1959	2
"Heartaches by the Number"	Guy Mitchell	Columbia	December 7, 1959	3
"Why"	Frankie Avalon	Chancellor	December 28, 1959	1
"El Paso"	Marty Robbins	Columbia	January 4, 1960	2
"Running Bear"	Johnny Preston	Mercury	January 18, 1960	3
"Teen Angel"	Mark Dinning	MGM	February 8, 1960	2
"He'll Have to Go"	Jim Reeves	RCA Victor	February 22, 1960	3*
"Theme from A Summer Place"	Percy Faith and his Orchestra	Columbia	February 29, 1960	5
"Greenfields"	The Brothers Four	Columbia	April 18, 1960	1
"Stuck on You"	Elvis Presley	RCA Victor	April 25, 1960	3
"Cathy's Clown"	The Everly Brothers	Warner Bros.	May 16, 1960	4
"Everybody's Somebody's Fool"	Connie Francis	MGM	June 13, 1960	3
"Alley Oop"	The Hollywood Argyles	Lute	July 4, 1960	1
"I'm Sorry"	Brenda Lee	Decca	July 11, 1960	3
"Itsy Bitsy Teenie Weenie Yellow Polkadot Bikini"	Brian Hyland	Leader	August 1, 1960	2
"It's Now or Never"	Elvis Presley	RCA Victor	August 15, 1960	3
"The Twist"	Chubby Checker	Parkway	September 5, 1960	2
"My Heart Has a Mind of Its Own"	Connie Francis	MGM	September 19, 1960	4
"Save the Last Dance for Me"	The Drifters	Atlantic	October 17, 1960	5
"Last Date"	Floyd Cramer	RCA Victor	November 21, 1960	1
"Are You Lonesome Tonight?"	Elvis Presley	RCA Victor	November 28, 1960	4
"Wonderland by Night"	Bert Kaempfert	Decca	December 26, 1960	3
"Exodus"	Ferrante and Teicher	United Artists	January 16, 1961	1
"Calcutta"	Lawrence Welk	Dot	January 23, 1961	6
"Surrender"	Elvis Presley	RCA Victor	March 6, 1961	3
"Blue Moon"	The Marcels	Colpix	March 27, 1961	3
"Runaway"	Del Shannon	Bigtop	April 17, 1961	4
"Mother-in-Law"	Ernie K-Doe	Minit	May 15, 1961	1
"A Hundred Pounds of Clay"	Gene McDaniels	Liberty	May 22, 1961	1
"Travelin' Man"	Ricky Nelson	Imperial	May 29, 1961	4
"Quarter to Three"	Gary U.S. Bonds	Legrand	June 26, 1961	4
"Tossin' and Turnin'"	Bobby Lewis	Beltone	July 24, 1961	4
"Michael"	The Highwaymen	United Artists	August 21, 1961	4
"Take Good Care of My Baby"	Bobby Vee	Liberty	September 18, 1961	2
"Crying"	Roy Orbison	Monument	October 2, 1961	1
"Runaround Sue"	Dion	Laurie	October 9, 1961	3
"Big Bad John"	Jimmy Dean	Columbia	October 30, 1961	6
"The Lion Sleeps Tonight"	The Tokens	RCA Victor	December 11, 1961	4
"The Twist"	Chubby Checker	Parkway	January 8, 1962	3
"Duke of Earl"	Gene Chandler	Vee-Jay	January 29, 1962	5
"Hey! Baby"	Bruce Channel	Smash	March 5, 1962	3
"Good Luck Charm"	Elvis Presley	RCA Victor	March 26, 1962	3
"Johnny Angel"	Shelley Fabares	Colpix	April 16, 1962	1
"Mashed Potato Time"	Dee Dee Sharp	Cameo	April 23, 1962	1
"Soldier Boy"	The Shirelles	Scepter	April 30, 1962	2
"Stranger on the Shore"	Mr. Acker Bilk	ATCO	May 19, 1962	2
"I Can't Stop Loving You"	Ray Charles	ABC-Paramount	June 2, 1962	5
"The Stripper"	David Rose	MGM	July 7, 1962	1
"Roses Are Red (My Love)"	Bobby Vinton	Epic	July 14, 1962	5
"Breaking Up Is Hard to Do"	Neil Sedaka	RCA Victor	August 18, 1962	1
"The Loco-Motion"	Little Eva	Dimension	August 25, 1962	2
"Ramblin' Rose"	Nat King Cole	Capitol	September 8, 1962	1
"Sherry"	The Four Seasons	Vee-Jay	September 15, 1962	5
"Monster Mash"	Bobby (Boris) Pickett and the Crypt-Kickers	Garpax	October 20, 1962	2
"He's a Rebel"	The Crystals	Philles	November 3, 1962	1
"Big Girls Don't Cry"	The Four Seasons	Vee-Jay	November 10, 1962	6
"Return to Sender"	Elvis Presley	RCA Victor	December 22, 1962	1
"Telstar"	The Tornadoes	London	December 29, 1962	2
"Go Away Little Girl"	Steve Lawrence	Columbia	January 12, 1963	3
"Walk Right In"	The Rooftop Singers	Vanguard	February 2, 1963	1
"Hey Paula"	Paul and Paula	Philips	February 9, 1963	4
"Walk Like a Man"	The Four Seasons	Vee-Jay	March 9, 1963	2
"The End of the World"	Skeeter Davis	RCA Victor	March 23, 1963	1
"Our Day Will Come"	Ruby and the Romantics	Kapp	March 30, 1963	1
"He's So Fine"	The Chiffons	Laurie	April 6, 1963	3
"I Will Follow Him"	Little Peggy March	RCA Victor	April 27, 1963	3
"If You Wanna Be Happy"	Jimmy Soul	S.P.Q.R.	May 18, 1963	2
"It's My Party"	Lesley Gore	Mercury	June 1, 1963	3
"Sukiyaki"	Kyu Sakamoto	Capitol	June 22, 1963	2
"Blue on Blue"	Bobby Vinton	Epic	July 6, 1963	1
"Easier Said Than Done"	The Essex	Roulette	July 13, 1963	2
"Surf City"	Jan and Dean	Liberty	July 27, 1963	1
"So Much in Love"	The Tymes	Parkway	August 3, 1963	1
"Fingertips (Part 2)"	Little Stevie Wonder	Tamla	August 10, 1963	3
"Hello Mudduh, Hello Fadduh!"	Allan Sherman	Warner Bros.	August 31, 1963	1
"My Boyfriend's Back"	The Angels	Smash	September 7, 1963	2
"Blue Velvet"	Bobby Vinton	Epic	September 21, 1963	2
"Sally, Go 'Round the Roses"	The Jaynetts	Tuff	October 5, 1963	1
"Sugar Shack"	Jimmy Gilmer and the Fireballs	Dot	October 12, 1963	5
"Deep Purple"	Nino Tempo and April Stevens	ATCO	November 16, 1963	1
"I'm Leaving It Up to You"	Dale and Grace	Montel	November 23, 1963	1
"Dominique"	The Singing Nun	Philips	November 30, 1963	4
"Louie, Louie"	The Kingsmen	Wand	December 28, 1963	1
"There! I've Said It Again"	Bobby Vinton	Epic	January 4, 1964	2
"Popsicles and Icicles"	The Murmaids	Chattahoochee	January 18, 1964	1
"I Want to Hold Your Hand"	The Beatles	Capitol	January 25, 1964	9
"She Loves You"	The Beatles	Swan	March 28, 1964	1
"Twist and Shout"	The Beatles	Tollie	April 4, 1964	1
"Can't Buy Me Love"	The Beatles	Capitol	April 11, 1964	4
"Hello, Dolly!"	Louis Armstrong	Kapp	May 9, 1964	3
"Love Me Do"	The Beatles	Tollie	May 30, 1964	1
"Chapel of Love"	The Dixie Cups	Red Bird	June 6, 1964	4
"I Get Around"	The Beach Boys	Capitol	July 4, 1964	2
"Rag Doll"	The Four Seasons	Philips	July 18, 1964	2
"A Hard Day's Night"	The Beatles	Capitol	August 1, 1964	3
"Where Did Our Love Go"	The Supremes	Motown	August 22, 1964	2
"The House of the Rising Sun"	The Animals	MGM	September 5, 1964	3
"Bread and Butter"	The Newbeats	Hickory	September 26, 1964	1
"Oh, Pretty Woman"	Roy Orbison	Monument	October 3, 1964	1
"Do Wah Diddy Diddy"	Manfred Mann	Ascot	October 10, 1964	2
"Last Kiss"	J. Frank Wilson and the Cavaliers	Josie	October 24, 1964	2
"Baby Love"	The Supremes	Motown	November 7, 1964	4
"Leader of the Pack"	The Shangri-Las	Red Bird	December 5, 1964	1
"Mr. Lonely"	Bobby Vinton	Epic	December 12, 1964	2
"Come See About Me"	The Supremes	Motown	December 26, 1964	2*
"I Feel Fine"	The Beatles	Capitol	January 2, 1965	2
"Love Potion No. 9"	The Searchers	Kapp]	January 23, 1965	1
"Downtown"	Petula Clark	Warner Bros.	January 30, 1965	1
"You've Lost That Lovin' Feelin'"	The Righteous Brothers	Philles	February 6, 1965	3
"This Diamond Ring"	Gary Lewis and the Playboys	Liberty	February 27, 1965	2
"Eight Days a Week"	The Beatles	Capitol	March 13, 1965	3
"Stop! In the Name of Love"	The Supremes	Motown	April 3, 1965	1
"I'm Telling You Now"	Freddie and the Dreamers	Tower	April 10, 1965	2
"Game Of Love"	Wayne Fontana and the Mindbenders	Fontana	April 24, 1965	1
"Mrs. Brown, You've Got a Lovely Daughter"	Herman's Hermits	MGM	May 1, 1965	3
"Ticket to Ride"	The Beatles	Capitol	May 22, 1965	1
"Help Me, Rhonda"	The Beach Boys	Capitol	May 29, 1965	2
"Wooly Bully"	Sam the Sham and the Pharaohs	MGM	June 12, 1965	1
"I Can't Help Myself (Sugar Pie, Honey Bunch)"	The Four Tops	Motown	June 19, 1965	1
"Mr. Tambourine Man"	The Byrds	Columbia	June 26, 1965	1
"(I Can't Get No) Satisfaction"	The Rolling Stones	London	July 3, 1965	3
"I'm Henery the Eighth, I Am"	Herman's Hermits	MGM	July 24, 1965	3
"I Got You Babe"	Sonny and Cher	ATCO	August 14, 1965	4
"Help!"	The Beatles	Capitol	September 11, 1965	1
"Eve of Destruction"	Barry McGuire	Dunhill	September 18, 1965	2
"Hang On Sloopy"	The McCoys	Bang	October 2, 1965	2
"Yesterday"	The Beatles	Capitol	October 16, 1965	2
"A Lover's Concerto"	The Toys	DynoVoice	October 30, 1965	2
"I Hear a Symphony"	The Supremes	Motown	November 13, 1965	3
"Let's Hang On!"	The Four Seasons	Philips	December 4, 1965	1
"Turn! Turn! Turn!"	The Byrds	Columbia	December 11, 1965	2
"Over and Over"	The Dave Clark Five	Epic	December 25, 1965	1
"I Got You (I Feel Good)"	James Brown	King	January 1, 1966	1
"We Can Work It Out"	The Beatles	Capitol	January 8, 1966	2
"The Sound of Silence"	Simon and Garfunkel	Columbia	January 22, 1966	2
"Barbara Ann"	The Beach Boys	Capitol	February 5, 1966	2
"My Love"	Petula Clark	Warner Bros.	February 19, 1966	1
"Lightnin' Strikes"	Lou Christie	MGM	February 26, 1966	1
"These Boots Are Made for Walkin'"	Nancy Sinatra	Reprise	March 5, 1966	1
"The Ballad of the Green Berets"	SSgt. Barry Sadler	RCA Victor	March 12, 1966	3
"Nowhere Man"	The Beatles	Capitol	April 2, 1966	2
"(You're My) Soul and Inspiration"	The Righteous Brothers	Verve	April 16, 1966	2
"Good Lovin'"	The Young Rascals	Atlantic	April 30, 1966	2
"Monday, Monday"	The Mamas and the Papas	Dunhill	May 14, 1966	2
"When a Man Loves a Woman"	Percy Sledge	Atlantic	May 28, 1966	2
"A Groovy Kind of Love"	The Mindbenders	Fontana	June 11, 1966	1
"Paint It Black"	The Rolling Stones	London	June 18, 1966	1
"Strangers in the Night"	Frank Sinatra	Reprise	June 25, 1966	1
"Paperback Writer"	The Beatles	Capitol	July 2, 1966	1
"Hanky Panky"	Tommy James and the Shondells	Roulette	July 9, 1966	2
"Wild Thing"	The Troggs	Fontana	July 23, 1966	2
"They're Coming to Take Me Away, Ha-Haaa!"	Napoleon XIV	Warner Bros.	August 6, 1966	1
"Li'l Red Riding Hood"	Sam the Sham and the Pharaohs	MGM	August 13, 1966	1
"Summer in the City"	The Lovin' Spoonful	Kama Sutra	August 20, 1966	1
"Sunny"	Bobby Hebb	Philips	August 27, 1966	1
"Sunshine Superman"	Donovan	Epic	September 3, 1966	1
"Yellow Submarine"	The Beatles	Capitol	September 10, 1966	1
"See You in September"	The Happenings	B.T. Puppy	September 17, 1966	1
"You Can't Hurry Love"	The Supremes	Motown	September 24, 1966	2
"Cherish"	The Association	Valiant	October 8, 1966	2
"96 Tears"	? and the Mysterians	Cameo	October 22, 1966	1
"Last Train to Clarksville"	The Monkees	Colgems	October 29, 1966	2
"Poor Side of Town"	Johnny Rivers	Imperial	November 12, 1966	1
"You Keep Me Hangin' On"	The Supremes	Motown	November 19, 1966	2*
"Good Vibrations"	The Beach Boys	Capitol	November 26, 1966	1
"Winchester Cathedral"	The New Vaudeville Band	Fontana	December 10, 1966	1
"Mellow Yellow"	Donovan	Epic	December 17, 1966	2
"I'm a Believer"	The Monkees	Colgems	December 31, 1966	5*
"That's Life" [tied at number one with the Monkees]	Frank Sinatra	Reprise	December 31, 1966	1
"Snoopy vs. the Red Baron"	The Royal Guardsmen	Laurie	January 7, 1967	1
"Georgy Girl"	The Seekers	Capitol	February 11, 1967	1
"Kind of a Drag"	The Buckinghams	USA	February 18, 1967	1
"Ruby Tuesday"	The Rolling Stones	London	February 25, 1967	1
"Love Is Here and Now You're Gone"	The Supremes	Motown	March 4, 1967	2
"Penny Lane"	The Beatles	Capitol	March 18, 1967	2
"Happy Together"	The Turtles	White Whale	April 1, 1967	2
"Somethin' Stupid"	Frank and Nancy Sinatra	Reprise	April 15, 1967	3*
"A Little Bit Me, A Little Bit You"	The Monkees	Colgems	April 29, 1967	1
"The Happening"	The Supremes	Motown	May 13, 1967	1
"Groovin'"	The Young Rascals	Atlantic	May 20, 1967	2
"Respect"	Aretha Franklin	Atlantic	June 3, 1967	3
"She'd Rather Be with Me"	The Turtles	White Whale	June 24, 1967	1
"Windy"	The Association	Warner Bros.	July 1, 1967	2
"Little Bit O' Soul"	The Music Explosion	Laurie	July 15, 1967	1
"Can't Take My Eyes Off You"	Frankie Valli	Philips	July 22, 1967	2
"Light My Fire"	The Doors	Elektra	August 5, 1967	1
"All You Need Is Love"	The Beatles	Capitol	August 12, 1967	2
"Ode to Billie Joe"	Bobbie Gentry	Capitol	August 26, 1967	4
"The Letter"	The Box Tops	Mala	September 23, 1967	4
"To Sir with Love"	Lulu	Epic	October 21, 1967	3
"Soul Man"	Sam and Dave	Stax	November 11, 1967	1
"Incense and Peppermints"	Strawberry Alarm Clock	Uni	November 18, 1967	2
"Daydream Believer"	The Monkees	Colgems	December 2, 1967	3
"Hello, Goodbye"	The Beatles	Capitol	December 23, 1967	4
"Judy in Disguise (with Glasses)"	John Fred and his Playboy Band	Paula	January 20, 1968	2
"Bend Me, Shape Me"	The American Breed	Acta	February 3, 1968	1
"Green Tambourine"	The Lemon Pipers	Buddah	February 10, 1968	1
"Love Is Blue"	Paul Mauriat	Philips	February 17, 1968	3
"(Theme from) Valley of the Dolls"	Dionne Warwick	Scepter	March 9, 1968	2
"Simon Says"	1910 Fruitgum Company	Buddah	March 23, 1968	1
"Valleri"	The Monkees	Colgems	March 30, 1968	2
"Young Girl"	Gary Puckett and the Union Gap	Columbia	April 13, 1968	1
"Honey"	Bobby Goldsboro	United Artists	April 20, 1968	5
"Tighten Up"	Archie Bell and the Drells	Atlantic	May 25, 1968	1
"Mrs. Robinson"	Simon and Garfunkel	Columbia	June 1, 1968	3
"This Guy's in Love with You"	Herb Alpert	A&M	June 22, 1968	4
"Grazing in the Grass"	Hugh Masekela	Uni	July 20, 1968	3
"Lady Willpower"	Gary Puckett and the Union Gap	Columbia	August 10, 1968	1
"Hello, I Love You"	The Doors	Elektra	August 17, 1968	1
"People Got To Be Free"	The Rascals	Atlantic	August 24, 1968	2
"Harper Valley P.T.A."	Jeannie C. Riley	Plantation	September 7, 1968	3
"Hey Jude"	The Beatles	Apple	September 28, 1968	4
"Those Were the Days"	Mary Hopkin	Apple	October 26, 1968	4
"Love Child"	Diana Ross and the Supremes	Motown	November 23, 1968	4
"I Heard It Through the Grapevine"	Marvin Gaye	Tamla	December 21, 1968	1
"For Once in My Life"	Stevie Wonder	Tamla	December 28, 1968	1
"I'm Gonna Make You Love Me"	Diana Ross & the Supremes and the Temptations	Motown	January 4, 1969	3
"Soulful Strut"	Young-Holt Unlimited	Brunswick	January 25, 1969	1
"Crimson and Clover"	Tommy James and the Shondells	Roulette	February 1, 1969	2
"Everyday People"	Sly and the Family Stone	Epic	February 15, 1969	1
"Build Me Up Buttercup"	The Foundations	Uni	February 22, 1969	2
"You Showed Me"	The Turtles	White Whale	March 8, 1969	1
"Proud Mary"	Creedence Clearwater Revival	Fantasy	March 15, 1969	1
"Dizzy"	Tommy Roe	ABC	March 22, 1969	2
"Aquarius/Let the Sunshine In"	The 5th Dimension	Soul City	April 5, 1969	4
"Hair"	The Cowsills	MGM	May 3, 1969	3
"Get Back"	The Beatles	Apple	May 24, 1969	4
"Bad Moon Rising"	Creedence Clearwater Revival	Fantasy	June 21, 1969	1
"In the Ghetto"	Elvis Presley	RCA Victor	June 28, 1969	1
"Love Theme from Romeo and Juliet"	Henry Mancini	RCA Victor	July 5, 1969	1
"One"	Three Dog Night	Dunhill	July 12, 1969	1
"In the Year 2525"	Zager and Evans	RCA Victor	July 19, 1969	4
"Crystal Blue Persuasion" [tied at #1 w/ Zager & Evans]	Tommy James and the Shondells	Roulette	August 9, 1969	1
"Honky Tonk Women"	The Rolling Stones	London	August 16, 1969	3
"A Boy Named Sue"	Johnny Cash	Columbia	September 6, 1969	1
"Sugar, Sugar"	The Archies	Calendar	September 13, 1969	3
"Easy to Be Hard"	Three Dog Night	Dunhill	October 4, 1969	2
"Jean"	Oliver	Crewe	October 18, 1969	1
"Suspicious Minds"	Elvis Presley	RCA Victor	October 25, 1969	2
"Something"/"Come Together"	The Beatles	Apple	November 8, 1969	5
"Wedding Bell Blues" [tied at #1 w/ Beatles]	The 5th Dimension	Soul City	November 22, 1969	1
"Na Na Hey Hey Kiss Him Goodbye"	Steam	Fontana	December 13, 1969	1
"Leaving on a Jet Plane"	Peter, Paul, and Mary	Warner Bros.	December 20, 1969	2
"Raindrops Keep Fallin' on My Head"	B.J. Thomas	Scepter	January 3, 1970	3
"Venus"	Shocking Blue	Colossus	January 24, 1970	3
"Thank You (Falettin Me Be Mice Elf Agin)"/ "Everybody Is a Star"	Sly and the Family Stone	Epic	February 14, 1970	2
"Bridge Over Troubled Water"	Simon and Garfunkel	Columbia	February 28, 1970	3
"The Rapper"	The Jaggerz	Kama Sutra	March 21, 1970	2
"ABC" [tied at #1 w/ Beatles on 4/25]	The Jackson 5	Motown	April 4, 1970	2*
"Let It Be"	The Beatles	Apple	April 11, 1970	3
"Spirit in the Sky"	Norman Greenbaum	Reprise	May 2, 1970	2
"American Woman"/"No Sugar Tonight"	The Guess Who	RCA Victor	May 16, 1970	1
"Turn Back the Hands of Time"	Tyrone Davis	Dakar	May 23, 1970	2
"Cecilia"	Simon and Garfunkel	Columbia	June 6, 1970	1
"The Long and Winding Road"/"For You Blue"	The Beatles	Apple	June 13, 1970	2
"The Love You Save"	The Jackson 5	Motown	June 27, 1970	1
"Mama Told Me (Not to Come)"	Three Dog Night	Dunhill	July 4, 1970	3
"Band of Gold"	Freda Payne	Invictus	July 25, 1970	1
"(They Long to Be) Close to You"	The Carpenters	A&M	August 1, 1970	2
"Make It with You"	Bread	Elektra	August 15, 1970	1
"Signed, Sealed, Delivered (I'm Yours)"	Stevie Wonder	Tamla	August 22, 1970	1
"Spill the Wine"	Eric Burdon and War	MGM	August 29, 1970	1
"War"	Edwin Starr	Gordy	September 5, 1970	1
"In the Summertime"	Mungo Jerry	Janus	September 12, 1970	1
"Ain't No Mountain High Enough"	Diana Ross	Motown	September 19, 1970	1
"Looking Out My Back Door"	Creedence Clearwater Revival	Fantasy	September 26, 1970	1
"Julie, Do Ya Love Me"	Bobby Sherman	Metromedia	October 3, 1970	1
"Cracklin' Rosie"	Neil Diamond	Uni	October 10, 1970	1
"I'll Be There"	The Jackson 5	Motown	October 17, 1970	4
"We've Only Just Begun"	The Carpenters	A&M	November 14, 1970	1
"I Think I Love You"	The Partridge Family	Bell	November 21, 1970	4
"My Sweet Lord"	George Harrison	Apple	December 19, 1970	3
"Knock Three Times"	Dawn	Bell	January 9, 1971	4
"Lonely Days"	Bee Gees	ATCO	February 6, 1971	1
"Rose Garden"	Lynn Anderson	Columbia	February 13, 1971	1
"One Bad Apple"	The Osmonds	MGM	February 20, 1971	4
"Me and Bobby McGee"	Janis Joplin	Columbia	March 20, 1971	1
"Just My Imagination (Running Away with Me)"	The Temptations	Gordy	March 27, 1971	1
"Doesn't Somebody Want to Be Wanted"	The Partridge Family	Bell	April 3, 1971	1
"She's a Lady"	Tom Jones	Parrot	April 10, 1971	1
"Joy to the World"	Three Dog Night	Dunhill	April 17, 1971	5
"Brown Sugar"	The Rolling Stones	Rolling Stones	May 22, 1971	3
"Want Ads"	The Honey Cone	Hot Wax	June 12, 1971	2
"It Don't Come Easy"	Ringo Starr	Apple	June 26, 1971	1
"It's Too Late"	Carole King	Ode	July 3, 1971	2
"Indian Reservation"	The Raiders	Columbia	July 17, 1971	3
"Mr. Big Stuff"	Jean Knight	Stax	August 7, 1971	1
"How Can You Mend a Broken Heart"	Bee Gees	ATCO	August 14, 1971	1
"Draggin' the Line"	Tommy James	Roulette	August 21, 1971	1
"Take Me Home, Country Roads"	John Denver	RCA Victor	August 28, 1971	2
"Uncle Albert/Admiral Halsey"	Paul and Linda McCartney	Apple	September 11, 1971	1
"Spanish Harlem"	Aretha Franklin	Atlantic	September 18, 1971	1
"The Night They Drove Old Dixie Down"	Joan Baez	Vanguard	September 25, 1971	1
"Maggie May"/"Reason to Believe"	Rod Stewart	Mercury	October 2, 1971	1
"Superstar"	The Carpenters	A&M	October 9, 1971	1
"Yo-Yo"	The Osmonds	MGM	October 16, 1971	2
"Gypsys, Tramps and Thieves"	Cher	Kapp	October 30, 1971	1
"Theme from Shaft"	Isaac Hayes	Enterprise	November 6, 1971	2
"Imagine"	John Lennon	Apple	November 20, 1971	1
"Family Affair"	Sly and the Family Stone	Epic	November 27, 1971	2
"Have You Seen Her"	The Chi-Lites	Brunswick	December 11, 1971	2
"Brand New Key"	Melanie	Neighborhood	December 25, 1971	1
"American Pie"	Don McLean	United Artists	January 1, 1972	5
"Day After Day"	Badfinger	Apple	February 5, 1972	2
"Without You"	Harry Nilsson	RCA Victor	February 19, 1972	2
"Hurting Each Other"	The Carpenters	A&M	March 4, 1972	1
"Precious and Few"	Climax	Rocky Road	March 11, 1972	1
"Heart of Gold"	Neil Young	Reprise	March 18, 1972	1
"A Horse with No Name"	America	Warner Bros.	March 25, 1972	3
"The First Time Ever I Saw Your Face"	Roberta Flack	Atlantic	April 15, 1972	5
"Oh Girl"	The Chi-Lites	Brunswick	May 20, 1972	2
"I'll Take You There"	The Staple Singers	Stax	June 3, 1972	1
"The Candy Man"	Sammy Davis Jr.	MGM	June 10, 1972	2
"Song Sung Blue"	Neil Diamond	Uni	June 24, 1972	2
"Outa-Space"	Billy Preston	A&M	July 8, 1972	1
"Lean on Me"	Bill Withers	Sussex	July 15, 1972	1
"Too Late to Turn Back Now"	Cornelius Brothers and Sister Rose	United Artists	July 22, 1972	1
"Daddy Don't You Walk So Fast"	Wayne Newton	Chelsea	July 29, 1972	2
"Alone Again (Naturally)"	Gilbert O'Sullivan	MAM	August 12, 1972	4
"Long Cool Woman (in a Black Dress)"	The Hollies	Epic	September 9, 1972	1
"I'm Still in Love with You"	Al Green	Hi	September 16, 1972	1
"Baby Don't Get Hooked on Me"	Mac Davis	Columbia	September 23, 1972	1
"Black and White"	Three Dog Night	Dunhill	September 30, 1972	2
"Everybody Plays the Fool"	The Main Ingredient	RCA Victor	October 14, 1972	1
"My Ding-a-Ling"	Chuck Berry	Chess	October 21, 1972	2
"Nights In White Satin"	The Moody Blues	Deram	November 4, 1972	2
"I Can See Clearly Now"	Johnny Nash	Epic	November 18, 1972	1
"I'll Be Around"	The Spinners	Atlantic	November 25, 1972	1
"I'd Love You to Want Me"	Lobo	Big Tree	December 2, 1972	1
"I Am Woman"	Helen Reddy	Capitol	December 9, 1972	2
"Me and Mrs. Jones"	Billy Paul	Phil. Int'l.	December 23, 1972	2*
"You Ought to Be with Me"	Al Green	Hi	December 30, 1972	1
"You're So Vain"	Carly Simon	Elektra	January 13, 1973	1
"Superstition"	Stevie Wonder	Tamla	January 20, 1973	2
"Crocodile Rock"	Elton John	MCA	February 3, 1973	2
"Dueling Banjos"	Eric Weissberg and Steve Mandell	Warner Bros.	February 17, 1973	2
"Could It Be I'm Falling in Love"	The Spinners	Atlantic	March 3, 1973	1
"Killing Me Softly With His Song"	Roberta Flack	Atlantic	March 10, 1973	3
"Love Train"	The O'Jays	Phil. Int'l.	March 31, 1973	1
"Neither One of Us"	Gladys Knight & the Pips	Soul	April 7, 1973	1
"The Night The Lights Went Out in Georgia"	Vicki Lawrence	Bell	April 14, 1973	2
"Tie a Yellow Ribbon Round the Ole Oak Tree"	Tony Orlando and Dawn	Bell	April 28, 1973	1
"The Cisco Kid"	War	United Artists	May 5, 1973	1
"You Are The Sunshine of My Life"	Stevie Wonder	Tamla	May 12, 1973	1
"Frankenstein"	The Edgar Winter Group	Epic	May 19, 1973	2
"My Love"	Paul McCartney and Wings	Apple	June 2, 1973	5
"Give Me Love (Give Me Peace On Earth)"	George Harrison	Apple	July 7, 1973	1
"Kodachrome"	Paul Simon	Columbia	July 14, 1973	1
"Bad, Bad Leroy Brown"	Jim Croce	ABC	July 21, 1973	1
"Shambala"	Three Dog Night	Dunhill	July 28, 1973	1
"Yesterday Once More"	The Carpenters	A&M	August 4, 1973	1
"Touch Me In The Morning"	Diana Ross	Motown	August 11, 1973	1
"The Morning After"	Maureen McGovern	20th Century Fox	August 18, 1973	1
"Live and Let Die"	Paul McCartney and Wings	Apple	August 25, 1973	1
"Let's Get It On"	Marvin Gaye	Tamla	September 1, 1973	2
"Delta Dawn"	Helen Reddy	Capitol	September 15, 1973	2
"We're an American Band"	Grand Funk Railroad	Capitol	September 29, 1973	1
"Half-Breed"	Cher	MCA	October 6, 1973	1
"Higher Ground"	Stevie Wonder	Tamla	October 13, 1973	1
"Angie"	The Rolling Stones	Rolling Stones	October 20, 1973	2
"Midnight Train to Georgia"	Gladys Knight & The Pips	Buddah	November 3, 1973	1
"Keep On Truckin'"	Eddie Kendricks	Tamla	November 10, 1973	1
"Heartbeat - It's a Lovebeat"	The DeFranco Family	20th Century Fox	November 17, 1973	1
"Photograph"	Ringo Starr	Apple	November 24, 1973	2
"Goodbye Yellow Brick Road"	Elton John	MCA	December 8, 1973	1
"The Most Beautiful Girl"	Charlie Rich	Epic	December 15, 1973	2
"Leave Me Alone (Ruby Red Dress)"	Helen Reddy	Capitol	December 29, 1973	1
"Time in a Bottle"	Jim Croce	ABC	January 5, 1974	1
"The Joker"	The Steve Miller Band	Capitol	January 12, 1974	1
"Show and Tell"	Al Wilson	Rocky Road	January 19, 1974	1
"You're Sixteen"	Ringo Starr	Apple	January 26, 1974	1
"The Way We Were"	Barbra Streisand	Columbia	February 2, 1974	1
"Americans"	Byron MacGregor	Westbound	February 9, 1974	1
"Love's Theme"	The Love Unlimited Orchestra	20th Century Fox	February 16, 1974	1
"Seasons in the Sun"	Terry Jacks	Bell	February 23, 1974	3
"Boogie Down"	Eddie Kendricks	Tamla	March 16, 1974	1
"Sunshine on My Shoulders"	John Denver	RCA Victor	March 23, 1974	1
"Bennie and the Jets"	Elton John	MCA	March 30, 1974	1
"Hooked on a Feeling"	Blue Swede	EMI	April 6, 1974	2
"TSOP (The Sound of Philadelphia)"	MFSB ft. The Three Degrees	Phil. Int'l.	April 20, 1974	2
"The Loco-Motion"	Grand Funk Railroad	Capitol	May 4, 1974	1
"Dancing Machine"	The Jackson 5	Motown	May 11, 1974	1
"The Streak"	Ray Stevens	Barnaby	May 18, 1974	2*
"The Show Must Go On"	Three Dog Night	Dunhill	May 25, 1974	1
"Band on the Run"	Paul McCartney and Wings	Apple	June 8, 1974	1
"You Make Me Feel Brand New"	The Stylistics	AVCO	June 15, 1974	1
"Billy, Don't Be a Hero"	Bo Donaldson and the Heywoods	ABC	June 22, 1974	1
"Sundown"	Gordon Lightfoot	Reprise	June 29, 1974	1
"Be Thankful for What You Got"	William DeVaughn	Roxbury	July 6, 1974	1
"Rock the Boat"	The Hues Corporation	RCA Victor	July 13, 1974	1
"Rock Your Baby"	George McCrae	T.K.	July 20, 1974	1
"Annie's Song"	John Denver	RCA Victor	July 27, 1974	1
"Don't Let the Sun Go Down on Me"	Elton John	MCA	August 3, 1974	1
"Feel Like Makin' Love"	Roberta Flack	Atlantic	August 10, 1974	1
"The Night Chicago Died"	Paper Lace	Mercury	August 17, 1974	1
"(You're) Having My Baby"	Paul Anka	United Artists	August 24, 1974	2
"I Shot the Sheriff"	Eric Clapton	RSO	September 7, 1974	2
"Can't Get Enough of Your Love, Babe"	Barry White	20th Century Fox	September 21, 1974	1
"I Honestly Love You"	Olivia Newton-John	MCA	September 28, 1974	2
"Then Came You"	Dionne Warwick and Spinners	Atlantic	October 12, 1974	1
"Nothing from Nothing"	Billy Preston	A&M	October 19, 1974	1
"Jazzman"	Carole King	Ode	October 26, 1974	1
"You Ain't Seen Nothing Yet"	Bachman-Turner Overdrive	Mercury	November 2, 1974	1
"You Haven't Done Nothin'"	Stevie Wonder	Tamla	November 9, 1974	1
"Whatever Gets You Thru the Night"	John Lennon	Apple	November 16, 1974	1
"I Can Help"	Billy Swan	Monument	November 23, 1974	1
"My Melody of Love"	Bobby Vinton	ABC	November 30, 1974	1
"When Will I See You Again"	The Three Degrees	Phil. Int'l.	December 7, 1974	1
"Kung Fu Fighting"	Carl Douglas	20th Century Fox	December 14, 1974	1
"Cat's in the Cradle"	Harry Chapin	Elektra	December 21, 1974	1
"Angie Baby"	Helen Reddy	Capitol	December 28, 1974	1
"Lucy in the Sky with Diamonds"	Elton John	MCA	January 4, 1975	2
"Mandy"	Barry Manilow	Bell	January 18, 1975	1
"Please Mr. Postman"	The Carpenters	A&M	January 25, 1975	1
"Laughter in the Rain"	Neil Sedaka	Rocket	February 1, 1975	1
"Boogie On Reggae Woman"	Stevie Wonder	Tamla	February 8, 1975	1
"Fire"	Ohio Players	Mercury	February 15, 1975	1
"You're No Good"	Linda Ronstadt	Capitol	February 22, 1975	1
"Pick Up the Pieces"	Average White Band	Atlantic	March 1, 1975	1
"Black Water"	The Doobie Brothers	Warner Bros.	March 8, 1975	1
"Have You Never Been Mellow"	Olivia Newton-John	MCA	March 15, 1975	1
"My Eyes Adored You"	Frankie Valli	Private Stock	March 22, 1975	1
"Lady Marmalade"	Patti LaBelle	Epic	March 29, 1975	1
"Lovin' You"	Minnie Ripperton	Epic	April 5, 1975	1
"Philadelphia Freedom"	Elton John	MCA	April 12, 1975	3
"Another Somebody Done Somebody Wrong Song"	B.J. Thomas	ABC	May 3, 1975	1
"He Don't Love You (Like I Love You)"	Tony Orlando and Dawn	Elektra	May 10, 1975	1
"Jackie Blue"	The Ozark Mountain Daredevils	A&M	May 17, 1975	1
"Shining Star"	Earth, Wind, and Fire	Columbia	May 24, 1975	1
"Before The Next Teardrop Falls"	Freddy Fender	Dot	May 31, 1975	1
"Thank God I'm a Country Boy"	John Denver	RCA Victor	June 7, 1975	1
"Sister Golden Hair"	America	Warner Bros.	June 14, 1975	1
"Love Will Keep Us Together"	Captain and Tennille	A&M	June 21, 1975	3
"The Hustle"	Van McCoy	AVCO	July 12, 1975	1
"Listen to What the Man Said"	Paul McCartney and Wings	Capitol	July 19, 1975	2
"One of These Nights"	Eagles	Asylum	August 2, 1975	1
"Jive Talkin'"	Bee Gees	RSO	August 9, 1975	2
"Someone Saved My Life Tonight"	Elton John	MCA	August 23, 1975	1
"Fallin' in Love"	Hamilton, Joe Frank, and Reynolds	Playboy	August 30, 1975	1
"Get Down Tonight"	KC and the Sunshine Band	T.K.	September 6, 1975	2
"Rhinestone Cowboy"	Glen Campbell	Capitol	September 20, 1975	1
"Fame"	David Bowie	RCA Victor	September 27, 1975	2
"I'm Sorry"/ "Calypso"	John Denver	RCA Victor	October 11, 1975	1
"Mr. Jaws"	Dickie Goodman	Cash	October 18, 1975	1
"Bad Blood"	Neil Sedaka	Rocket	October 25, 1975	1
"They Just Can't Stop It (The Games People Play)"	The Spinners	Atlantic	November 1, 1975	1
"Island Girl"	Elton John	MCA	November 8, 1975	3
"That's The Way (I Like It)"	KC and the Sunshine Band	T.K.	November 29, 1975	3*
"Fly, Robin, Fly"	Silver Convention	Midland Int'l	December 6, 1975	1
"Saturday Night"	Bay City Rollers	Arista	December 27, 1975	1
"Convoy"	C.W. McCall	MGM	January 3, 1976	3*
"Theme from Mahogany"	Diana Ross	Motown	January 10, 1976	1
"I Write the Songs"	Barry Manilow	Arista	January 17, 1976	1
"50 Ways to Leave Your Lover"	Paul Simon	Columbia	February 7, 1976	1
"Love to Love You Baby"	Donna Summer	Oasis	February 14, 1976	1
"Theme from S.W.A.T."	Rhythm Heritage	ABC	February 21, 1976	2
"Love Machine"	The Miracles	Tamla	March 6, 1976	1
"All by Myself"	Eric Carmen	Arista	March 13, 1976	1
"December, 1963 (Oh, What a Night)"	The Four Seasons	Warner Bros.	March 20, 1976	1
"Dream Weaver"	Gary Wright	Warner Bros.	March 27, 1976	1
"Lonely Night (Angel Face)"	Captain and Tennille	A&M	April 3, 1976	1
"Disco Lady"	Johnnie Taylor	Columbia	April 10, 1976	3
"Right Back Where We Started From"	Maxine Nightingale	United Artists	May 1, 1976	1
"Welcome Back"	John Sebastian	Reprise	May 8, 1976	2
"Boogie Fever"	The Sylvers	Capitol	May 22, 1976	1
"Silly Love Songs"	Paul McCartney and Wings	Capitol	May 29, 1976	4*
"Love Hangover"	Diana Ross	Motown	June 12, 1976	1
"Get Up and Boogie"	Silver Convention	Midland Int'l	June 26, 1976	1
"Kiss and Say Goodbye"	The Manhattans	Columbia	July 10, 1976	1
"Afternoon Delight"	Starland Vocal Band	Windsong	July 17, 1976	2*
"More, More, More"	The Andrea True Connection	Buddah	July 24, 1976	1
"Don't Go Breaking My Heart"	Elton John and Kiki Dee	Rocket	August 7, 1976	5
"Play That Funky Music"	Wild Cherry	Epic	September 11, 1976	2*
"(Shake, Shake, Shake) Shake Your Booty"	KC and the Sunshine Band	T.K.	September 18, 1976	1
"A Fifth of Beethoven"	Walter Murphy	Private Stock	September 25, 1976	1
"Disco Duck"	Rick Dees & His Cast of Idiots	RSO	October 9, 1976	3*
"If You Leave Me Now"	Chicago	Columbia	October 23, 1976	2
"Rock'n Me"	The Steve Miller Band	Capitol	November 13, 1976	1
"Tonight's the Night (Gonna Be Alright)"	Rod Stewart	Warner Bros.	November 20, 1976	6
"You Don't Have to Be a Star (to Be in My Show)"	Marilyn McCoo and Billy Davis Jr.	ABC	January 1, 1977	1
"You Make Me Feel Like Dancing"	Leo Sayer	Warner Bros.	January 8, 1977	1
"Car Wash"	Rose Royce	MCA	January 15, 1977	2*
"I Wish"	Stevie Wonder	Tamla	January 22, 1977	1
"Torn Between Two Lovers"	Mary MacGregor	Ariola Am.	February 5, 1977	4*
"Blinded by the Light"	Manfred Mann's Earth Band	Warner Bros.	February 19, 1977	1
"Evergreen (Love Theme from A Star Is Born)"	Barbra Streisand	Columbia	March 12, 1977	2
"Dancing Queen"	ABBA	Atlantic	March 26, 1977	1
"Rich Girl"	Daryl Hall and John Oates	RCA Victor	April 2, 1977	2
"Don't Give Up on Us"	David Soul	Private Stock	April 16, 1977	1
"Hotel California"	Eagles	Asylum	April 23, 1977	1
"Southern Nights"	Glen Campbell	Capitol	April 30, 1977	1
"When I Need You"	Leo Sayer	Warner Bros.	May 7, 1977	3
"Sir Duke"	Stevie Wonder	Tamla	May 28, 1977	2
"I'm Your Boogie Man"	KC and the Sunshine Band	T.K.	June 11, 1977	1
"Got to Give It Up"	Marvin Gaye	Tamla	June 18, 1977	1
"Dreams"	Fleetwood Mac	Warner Bros.	June 25, 1977	1
"Undercover Angel"	Alan O'Day	Pacific	July 2, 1977	4*
"Da Doo Ron Ron"	Shaun Cassidy	Warner Bros.	July 9, 1977	1
"I Just Want to Be Your Everything" [back to #1 on 9/3 and 9/10]	Andy Gibb	RSO	August 6, 1977	5*
"Best of My Love" [back to #1 on 9/17 and 9/24]	The Emotions	Columbia	August 27, 1977	3*
"Star Wars Theme/Cantina Band"	Meco	Millennium	October 1, 1977	2
"You Light Up My Life"	Debby Boone	Warner Bros.	October 15, 1977	13
"We Are the Champions"	Queen	Elektra	January 14, 1978	3
"Stayin' Alive"	Bee Gees	RSO	February 4, 1978	6*
"(Love Is) Thicker Than Water"	Andy Gibb	RSO	March 4, 1978	1
"Night Fever"	Bee Gees	RSO	March 25, 1978	8
"Too Much, Too Little, Too Late"	Johnny Mathis and Deniece Williams	Columbia	May 20, 1978	1
"With a Little Luck"	Paul McCartney and Wings	Capitol	May 27, 1978	1
"Shadow Dancing"	Andy Gibb	RSO	June 3, 1978	8
"You're the One That I Want"	John Travolta and Olivia Newton-John	RSO	July 29, 1978	1
"Three Times a Lady"	Commodores	Motown	August 5, 1978	5*
"Grease"	Frankie Valli	RSO	August 12, 1978	2
"Boogie Oogie Oogie"	A Taste of Honey	Capitol	September 23, 1978	1
"Kiss You All Over"	Exile	Warner Bros.	September 30, 1978	3
"Hot Child in the City"	Nick Gilder	Chrysalis	October 21, 1978	4
"MacArthur Park"	Donna Summer	Casablanca	November 18, 1978	2
"You Don't Bring Me Flowers"	Barbra Streisand and Neil Diamond	Columbia	December 2, 1978	2
"Le Freak"	Chic	Atlantic	December 16, 1978	7*
"Too Much Heaven"	Bee Gees	RSO	January 13, 1979	1
"Da Ya Think I'm Sexy?"	Rod Stewart	Warner Bros.	February 10, 1979	5*
"I Will Survive"	Gloria Gaynor	Polydor	March 10, 1979	1
"Tragedy"	Bee Gees	RSO	March 17, 1979	2*
"What a Fool Believes"	The Doobie Brothers	Warner Bros.	April 7, 1979	1
"Music Box Dancer"	Frank Mills	Polydor	April 14, 1979	1
"Knock on Wood"	Amii Stewart	Ariola	April 21, 1979	1
"Heart of Glass"	Blondie	Chrysalis	April 28, 1979	1
"Reunited"	Peaches and Herb	Polydor	May 5, 1979	4
"Hot Stuff"	Donna Summer	Casablanca	June 2, 1979	5
"Ring My Bell"	Anita Ward	Juana	July 7, 1979	1
"Bad Girls"	Donna Summer	Casablanca	July 14, 1979	4
"My Sharona"	The Knack	Capitol	August 11, 1979	5
"Sad Eyes"	Robert John	EMI America	September 15, 1979	5
"Sail On"	The Commodores	Motown	October 20, 1979	1
"Rise"	Herb Alpert	A&M	October 27, 1979	1
"Don't Stop 'Til You Get Enough"	Michael Jackson	Epic	November 3, 1979	1
"Heartache Tonight"	Eagles	Asylum	November 10, 1979	1
"Babe"	Styx	A&M	November 17, 1979	2*
"No More Tears (Enough Is Enough)"	Barbra Streisand and Donna Summer	Columbia	November 24, 1979	3
"Escape (The Piña Colada Song)"	Rupert Holmes	Infinity	December 22, 1979	4
"Rock with You"	Michael Jackson	Epic	January 19, 1980	2
"Coward of the County"	Kenny Rogers	United Artists	February 2, 1980	1
"Do That to Me One More Time"	Captain and Tennille	Casablanca	February 9, 1980	1
"Crazy Little Thing Called Love"	Queen	Elektra	February 16, 1980	2
"Yes, I'm Ready"	Teri DeSario and K.C.	Casablanca	March 1, 1980	1
"On the Radio"	Donna Summer	Casablanca	March 8, 1980	1
"Another Brick in the Wall (Part II)"	Pink Floyd	Columbia	March 15, 1980	5
"Call Me"	Blondie	Chrysalis	April 19, 1980	6
"Funkytown"	Lipps, Inc.	Casablanca	May 31, 1980	4
"The Rose"	Bette Midler	Atlantic	June 28, 1980	2
"It's Still Rock and Roll to Me"	Billy Joel	Columbia	July 12, 1980	4
"Magic"	Olivia Newton-John	MCA	August 9, 1980	3
"Sailing"	Christopher Cross	Warner Bros.	August 30, 1980	1
"All Out of Love"	Air Supply	Arista	September 6, 1980	2
"Upside Down"	Diana Ross	Motown	September 20, 1980	2
"Another One Bites the Dust"	Queen	Elektra	October 4, 1980	6*
"Woman in Love"	Barbra Streisand	Columbia	November 8, 1980	1
"Lady"	Kenny Rogers	Liberty	November 22, 1980	5
"(Just Like) Starting Over"	John Lennon	Geffen	December 27, 1980	5
"The Tide Is High"	Blondie	Chrysalis	January 31, 1981	2
"Celebration"	Kool and the Gang	De-Lite	February 14, 1981	1
"9 to 5"	Dolly Parton	RCA Victor	February 21, 1981	5*
"Keep On Loving You"	REO Speedwagon	Epic	March 21, 1981	1
"Rapture"	Blondie	Chrysalis	April 4, 1981	2
"Kiss on My List"	Daryl Hall and John Oates	RCA Victor	April 18, 1981	1
"Morning Train (Nine to Five)"	Sheena Easton	EMI America	April 25, 1981	3
"Angel of the Morning"	Juice Newton	Capitol	May 16, 1981	1
"Being with You"	Smokey Robinson	Tamla	May 23, 1981	1
"Bette Davis Eyes"	Kim Carnes	EMI America	May 30, 1981	5*
"Stars on 45"	Stars on 45	Radio	June 13, 1981	1
"The One That You Love"	Air Supply	Arista	July 11, 1981	1
"Theme from The Greatest American Hero"	Joey Scarbury	Elektra	July 18, 1981	2
"Jessie's Girl"	Rick Springfield	RCA Victor	August 1, 1981	2
"Endless Love"	Diana Ross and Lionel Richie	Motown	August 15, 1981	9
"Arthur's Theme (Best That You Can Do)"	Christopher Cross	Warner Bros.	October 17, 1981	3
"Private Eyes"	Daryl Hall and John Oates	RCA Victor	November 7, 1981	2
"Physical"	Olivia Newton-John	MCA	November 21, 1981	9
"I Can't Go for That (No Can Do)"	Daryl Hall and John Oates	RCA Victor	January 23, 1982	1
"Centerfold"	The J. Geils Band	EMI America	January 30, 1982	5
"Open Arms"	Journey	Columbia	March 6, 1982	1
"I Love Rock 'n' Roll"	Joan Jett and the Blackhearts	Boardwalk	March 13, 1982	5

== List of number-one albums, 1964–1982 ==
Album	Artist	Label	Chart date album reached #1	Weeks at #1
Introducing... The Beatles	The Beatles	Vee-Jay	April 18, 1964	1
The Beatles' Second Album	The Beatles	Capitol	April 25, 1964	5
Hello Dolly!	Louis Armstrong	Kapp	May 30, 1964	8
A Hard Day's Night	The Beatles	Capitol	July 25, 1964	13
People	Barbra Streisand	Columbia	October 24, 1964	7
Beach Boys Concert	The Beach Boys	Capitol	December 12, 1964	4
Beatles '65	The Beatles	Capitol	January 9, 1965	7
Goldfinger	John Barry	United Artists	February 27, 1965	4
Mary Poppins: Original Cast Soundtrack	Irwin Kostal	Buena Vista	March 27, 1965	9*
Introducing Herman's Hermits	Herman's Hermits	MGM	April 24, 1965	2
My Name Is Barbra	Barbra Streisand	Columbia	June 12, 1965	4
Herman's Hermits on Tour	Herman's Hermits	MGM	July 10, 1965	1
Beatles VI	The Beatles	Capitol	July 17, 1965	5
Out of Our Heads	The Rolling Stones	London	August 21, 1965	4
Help!	The Beatles	Capitol	September 18, 1965	8*
Look at Us	Sonny & Cher	ATCO	October 16, 1965	1
The Sound of Music	Various	RCA Victor	November 20, 1965	1
Whipped Cream and Other Delights	Herb Alpert and the Tijuana Brass	A&M	November 27, 1965	8*
My Name Is Barbra, Two...	Barbra Streisand	Columbia	December 4, 1965	2
Rubber Soul	The Beatles	Capitol	January 15, 1966	6
Ballads of the Green Berets	Barry Sadler	RCA Victor	March 19, 1966	6
Color Me Barbra	Barbra Streisand	Columbia	April 30, 1966	3
Going Places	Herb Alpert and the Tijuana Brass	A&M	May 21, 1966	1
What Now My Love	Herb Alpert and the Tijuana Brass	A&M	May 28, 1966	9
Yesterday and Today	The Beatles	Capitol	July 30, 1966	3
Aftermath	The Rolling Stones	London	August 20, 1966	2
Revolver	The Beatles	Capitol	September 9, 1966	8
The Monkees	The Monkees	Colgems	October 29, 1966	13*
S.R.O.	Herb Alpert and the Tijuana Brass	A&M	December 24, 1966	3
More of the Monkees	The Monkees	Colgems	February 18, 1967	13*
The Mamas and the Papas Deliver	The Mamas and the Papas	Dunhill	April 29, 1967	2
Revenge	Bill Cosby	Warner Bros.	June 3, 1967	1
I Never Loved a Man the Way I Love You	Aretha Franklin	Atlantic	June 10, 1967	1
Sounds Like	Herb Alpert and the Tijuana Brass	A&M	June 17, 1967	2
Headquarters	The Monkees	Colgems	July 1, 1967	1
Sgt. Pepper's Lonely Hearts Club Band	The Beatles	Capitol	July 8, 1967	13
Ode to Billie Joe	Bobbie Gentry	Capitol	October 7, 1967	4
Greatest Hits	Diana Ross and the Supremes	Motown	November 4, 1967	5
Pisces, Aquarius, Capricorn, and Jones, Ltd.	The Monkees	Colgems	December 9, 1967	4
Magical Mystery Tour	The Beatles	Capitol	January 6, 1968	7
John Wesley Harding	Bob Dylan	Columbia	February 24, 1968	1
Blooming Hits	Paul Mauriat and his Orchestra	Philips	March 2, 1968	6
The Graduate	Simon & Garfunkel	Columbia	April 13, 1968	6
Bookends	Simon & Garfunkel	Columbia	May 25, 1968	6
The Beat of the Brass	Herb Alpert and the Tijuana Brass	A&M	July 6, 1968	4
Wheels of Fire	Cream	ATCO	August 3, 1968	3
Time Peace: The Rascals' Greatest Hits	The Rascals	Atlantic	August 24, 1968	1
Waiting for the Sun	The Doors	Elektra	August 31, 1968	4
Cheap Thrills	Big Brother and the Holding Company	Columbia	September 28, 1968	6*
Feliciano!	Jose Feliciano	RCA Victor	October 26, 1968	1
Electric Ladyland	The Jimi Hendrix Experience	Reprise	November 2, 1968	4
The Beatles	The Beatles	Apple	December 14, 1968	14
Ball	Iron Butterfly	ATCO	March 22, 1969	1
Blood, Sweat & Tears	Blood, Sweat & Tears	Columbia	March 29, 1969	2
Hair (Original Broadway Cast Recording)	Various	RCA Victor	April 12, 1969	13*
Nashville Skyline	Bob Dylan	Columbia	May 31, 1969	3
Tommy	The Who	Decca	August 2, 1969	3
Romeo and Juliet	Nino Rota	Capitol	August 23, 1969	1
At San Quentin	Johnny Cash	Columbia	August 30, 1969	1
Blind Faith	Blind Faith	ATCO	September 6, 1969	5
Green River	Creedence Clearwater Revival	Fantasy	October 11, 1969	3
Abbey Road	The Beatles	Apple	November 1, 1969	12*
Led Zeppelin II	Led Zeppelin	Atlantic	January 3, 1970	6*
Bridge Over Troubled Water	Simon and Garfunkel	Columbia	March 7, 1970	3
Hey Jude	The Beatles	Apple	March 28, 1970	3
Deja Vu	Crosby, Stills, Nash, and Young	Atlantic	April 18, 1970	4
McCartney	Paul McCartney	Apple	May 16, 1970	4
Let It Be	The Beatles	Apple	June 13, 1970	5
"Woodstock: Music from the Original Soundtrack and More"	Various	Cotillion	July 18, 1970	1
Self Portrait	Bob Dylan	Columbia	July 25, 1970	2
Blood, Sweat & Tears 3	Blood, Sweat & Tears	Columbia	August 8, 1970	3
Cosmo's Factory	Creedence Clearwater Revival	Fantasy	August 29, 1970	7*
Mad Dogs and Englishmen	Joe Cocker	A&M	September 19, 1970	2
Abraxas	Santana	Columbia	October 31, 1970	4*
Led Zeppelin III	Led Zeppelin	Atlantic	November 14, 1970	3
Greatest Hits	Sly and the Family Stone	Epic	December 5, 1970	1
All Things Must Pass	George Harrison	Apple	December 26, 1970	8*
Jesus Christ Superstar	Various	Decca	February 6, 1971	5*
Chicago III	Chicago	Columbia	February 27, 1971	2
Pearl	Janis Joplin	Columbia	March 13, 1971	5*
Love Story	Francis Lai	Paramount	April 10, 1971	2
4 Way Street	Crosby, Stills, Nash, and Young	Atlantic	May 22, 1971	1
Sticky Fingers	The Rolling Stones	Rolling Stones	May 29, 1971	3
Tapestry	Carole King	Ode	June 26, 1971	15*
Every Picture Tells a Story	Rod Stewart	Mercury	October 2, 1971	2
Imagine	John Lennon	Apple	October 23, 1971	3
Shaft	Isaac Hayes	Enterprise	November 13, 1971	2
Santana III	Santana	Columbia	November 27, 1971	3
There's a Riot Goin' On	Sly and the Family Stone	Epic	December 18, 1971	1
Led Zeppelin IV	Led Zeppelin	Atlantic	December 25, 1971	2
Music	Carole King	Ode	January 8, 1972	2
American Pie	Don McLean	United Artists	January 22, 1972	3*
The Concert for Bangladesh	George Harrison and Friends	Apple	January 29, 1972	5
Harvest	Neil Young	Reprise	March 4, 1972	2
America	America	Warner Bros.	April 1, 1972	5
First Take	Roberta Flack	Atlantic	May 6, 1972	5
Thick as a Brick	Jethro Tull	Reprise	June 10, 1972	1
Exile on Main Street	The Rolling Stones	Rolling Stones	June 17, 1972	8
Honky Chateau	Elton John	Uni	August 12, 1972	2
Chicago V	Chicago	Columbia	August 26, 1972	3
Never a Dull Moment	Rod Stewart	Mercury	September 16, 1972	5
Superfly	Curtis Mayfield	Curtom	October 21, 1972	2
Days of Future Passed	The Moody Blues	Deram	November 4, 1972	1
Catch Bull at Four	Cat Stevens	A&M	November 11, 1972	4
Rhymes and Reasons	Carole King	Ode	December 9, 1972	2
Seventh Sojourn	The Moody Blues	Threshold	December 23, 1972	2
No Secrets	Carly Simon	Elektra	January 6, 1973	6
The World Is a Ghetto	War	United Artists	February 17, 1973	2
Don't Shoot Me, I'm Only the Piano Player	Elton John	MCA	March 3, 1973	3
Dueling Banjos (soundtrack to the film Deliverance)	Eric Weissberg	Warner Bros.	March 24, 1973	1
Lady Sings the Blues	Diana Ross	Motown	March 31, 1973	2
Billion Dollar Babies	Alice Cooper	Warner Bros.	April 14, 1973	1
The Dark Side of the Moon	Pink Floyd	Harvest	April 21, 1973	1
Aloha from Hawaii via Satellite	Elvis Presley	RCA Victor	April 28, 1973	2
Houses of the Holy	Led Zeppelin	Atlantic	May 12, 1973	2
1967–1970	The Beatles	Apple	May 26, 1973	2
Red Rose Speedway	Paul McCartney and Wings	Apple	June 9, 1973	2
Living in the Material World	George Harrison	Apple	June 23, 1973	5
Fantasy	Carole King	Ode	July 21, 1973	1
Now and Then	The Carpenters	A&M	July 28, 1973	1
Chicago VI	Chicago	Columbia	August 4, 1973	2
A Passion Play	Jethro Tull	Reprise	August 18, 1973	2
Brothers and Sisters	The Allman Brothers Band	Capricorn	September 1, 1973	4
We're an American Band	Grand Funk Railroad	Capitol	September 29, 1973	1
Let's Get It On	Marvin Gaye	Tamla	October 6, 1973	2
Goats Head Soup	The Rolling Stones	Rolling Stones	October 20, 1973	3
Goodbye Yellow Brick Road	Elton John	MCA	November 10, 1973	4*
Ringo	Ringo Starr	Apple	November 24, 1973	3
The Singles: 1969–1973	The Carpenters	A&M	December 29, 1973	2
You Don't Mess Around with Jim	Jim Croce	ABC	January 12, 1974	4*
I Got a Name	Jim Croce	ABC	January 19, 1974	2
Court and Spark	Joni Mitchell	Asylum	March 9, 1974	1
The Way We Were	Barbra Streisand	Columbia	March 16, 1974	1
John Denver's Greatest Hits	John Denver	RCA	March 23, 1974	4*
Band on the Run	Paul McCartney and Wings	Apple	April 13, 1974	3*
The Sting	Marvin Hamlisch	MCA	April 27, 1974	5
Sundown	Gordon Lightfoot	Reprise	June 15, 1974	2
Caribou	Elton John	MCA	July 13, 1974	3*
Back Home Again	John Denver	RCA	July 20, 1974	4*
461 Ocean Boulevard	Eric Clapton	RSO	August 17, 1974	2
Fullfillingness' First Finale	Stevie Wonder	Tamla	August 31, 1974	2
Endless Summer	The Beach Boys	Capitol	September 28, 1974	1
Bad Company	Bad Company	Swan Song	October 5, 1974	1
If You Love Me (Let Me Know)	Olivia Newton-John	MCA	October 12, 1974	1
Not Fragile	Bachman–Turner Overdrive	Mercury	October 19, 1974	1
Can't Get Enough	Barry White	20th Century	October 26, 1974	1
Photographs & Memories	Jim Croce	ABC	November 2, 1974	2
Walls and Bridges	John Lennon	Apple	November 16, 1974	1
Cheech & Chong's Wedding Album	Cheech & Chong	Ode	November 23, 1974	1
Wrap Around Joy	Carole King	Ode	November 30, 1974	1
It's Only Rock 'n Roll	The Rolling Stones	Rolling Stones	December 7, 1974	1
Greatest Hits	Elton John	MCA	December 14, 1974	8*
Fire	Ohio Players	Mercury	February 1, 1975	1
Heart Like a Wheel	Linda Rondstadt	Capitol	February 15, 1975	1
Blood on the Tracks	Bob Dylan	Columbia	February 22, 1975	3
Have You Never Been Mellow	Olivia Newton-John	MCA	March 15, 1975	2*
Physical Graffiti	Led Zeppelin	Swan Song	March 22, 1975	4
Chicago VIII	Chicago	Columbia	April 26, 1975	2
That's the Way of the World	Earth, Wind & Fire	Columbia	May 10, 1975	4
Captain Fantastic and the Brown Dirt Cowboy	Elton John	MCA	June 7, 1975	7*
Venus and Mars	Wings	Capitol	July 12, 1975	1
One of These Nights	Eagles	Asylum	July 19, 1975	4*
The Heat Is On	The Isley Brothers	T-Neck	August 2, 1975	3*
Red Octopus	Jefferson Starship	Grunt	September 13, 1975	1
Wish You Were Here	Pink Floyd	Columbia	October 4, 1975	1
Windsong	John Denver	RCA	October 11, 1975	5
Rock of the Westies	Elton John	MCA	November 15, 1975	3
Chicago IX: Chicago's Greatest Hits	Chicago	Columbia	December 6, 1975	8
Gratitude	Earth, Wind & Fire	Columbia	January 31, 1976	1
Desire	Bob Dylan	Columbia	February 7, 1976	4
Frampton Comes Alive!	Peter Frampton	A&M	March 6, 1976	17*
Their Greatest Hits (1971–1975)	Eagles	Asylum	March 13, 1976	6
Presence	Led Zeppelin	Swan Song	April 24, 1976	5
Black and Blue	The Rolling Stones	Rolling Stones	May 29, 1976	1
Wings at the Speed of Sound	Wings	Capitol	June 19, 1976	3
Fleetwood Mac	Fleetwood Mac	Reprise	July 10, 1976	1
Songs in the Key of Life	Stevie Wonder	Tamla	October 23, 1976	11
Hotel California	Eagles	Asylum	January 8, 1977	11*
A Star Is Born	Barbra Streisand and Kris Kristofferson	Columbia	February 5, 1977	7
Rumours	Fleetwood Mac	Warner Bros.	March 26, 1977	35*
Barry Manilow Live	Barry Manilow	Arista	July 2, 1977	1
Saturday Night Fever	Bee Gees and various artists	RSO	January 21, 1978	25
Some Girls	The Rolling Stones	Rolling Stones	July 15, 1978	1
Grease	Various	RSO	July 22, 1978	16
52nd Street	Billy Joel	Columbia	November 11, 1978	8*
Barbra Streisand's Greatest Hits Volume 2	Barbra Streisand	Columbia	December 23, 1978	4*
Blondes Have More Fun	Rod Stewart	Warner Bros.	February 3, 1979	3
Spirits Having Flown	Bee Gees	RSO	February 24, 1979	10*
Minute by Minute	The Doobie Brothers	Warner Bros.	April 21, 1979	1
Breakfast in America	Supertramp	A&M	May 12, 1979	9*
Bad Girls	Donna Summer	Casablanca	June 16, 1979	4*
Get the Knack	The Knack	Capitol	August 11, 1979	4
In Through the Out Door	Led Zeppelin	Swan Song	September 8, 1979	7
The Long Run	Eagles	Asylum	October 27, 1979	11*
On the Radio: Greatest Hits Volumes I & II	Donna Summer	Casablanca	December 22, 1979	1
The Wall	Pink Floyd	Columbia	February 9, 1980	14
Against the Wind	Bob Seger and the Silver Bullet Band	Capitol	May 17, 1980	2
Glass Houses	Billy Joel	Columbia	May 31, 1980	11*
Emotional Rescue	The Rolling Stones	Rolling Stones	August 9, 1980	1
Urban Cowboy	Various	Full Moon	August 16, 1980	5*
Xanadu	Olivia Newton-John and Electric Light Orchestra	MCA	September 27, 1980	1
The Game	Queen	Elektra	October 4, 1980	2
Guilty	Barbra Streisand	Columbia	October 25, 1980	3
Kenny Rogers' Greatest Hits	Kenny Rogers	Liberty	November 8, 1980	12
Double Fantasy	John Lennon and Yoko Ono	Geffen	February 14, 1981	2
Hi Infidelity	REO Speedwagon	Epic	February 28, 1981	21*
Mistaken Identity	Kim Carnes	EMI America	July 11, 1981	1
Long Distance Voyager	The Moody Blues	Threshold	July 25, 1981	1
Precious Time	Pat Benatar	Chrysalis	August 8, 1981	2
4	Foreigner	Atlantic	August 22, 1981	13*
Escape	Journey	Columbia	September 5, 1981	6*
Tattoo You	The Rolling Stones	Rolling Stones	September 26, 1981	5*
Freeze Frame	The J. Geils Band	EMI America	February 20, 1982	5*
Hooked on Classics	Royal Philharmonic Orchestra (conducted by Louis Clark)	RCA	February 27, 1982	1
Beauty and the Beat	The Go-Go's	I.R.S.	April 3, 1982	2

== See also ==
- List of Record World number-one albums of 1968
