= Love and Touch =

Studio album by Tyrone Davis
- Released: 1976
- Recorded: 1976
- Studios: Universal, Chicago, Illinois; Paragon (Chicago, Illinois); P.S. (Chicago, Illinois)
- Genres: Soul; funk; R&B; disco
- Label: Columbia
- Producer: Leo Graham

Tyrone Davis chronology
Turning Point! (1976)	Love and Touch (1976)	Let's Be Closer Together (1977)

Singles from Love and Touch
- 1. "Give It Up (Turn It Loose)" Released: 1976; 2. "Close To You" Released: 1977

Professional ratings
Review scores
Source	Rating
Allmusic	2/5 stars

Love and Touch is a Tyrone Davis album released in 1976. This was his debut Columbia Records release and second album released in 1976 after last his Dakar Records effort Turning Point!. The album was remastered and expanded through Funkytowngrooves in 2015.

== Background ==
Love and Touch marked the beginning of the collaboration between producer Leo Graham and Tyrone Davis. Singles released include, "Give It Up (Turn It Loose)", which peaked at No. 2 on the Billboard Hot Soul Singles chart and No. 39 on the Billboard Hot 100, and "Close to You", which reached No. 33 on the soul singles chart.

== Track listing ==
1. "Give It Up (Turn It Loose)" (Leo Graham) – 4:18
2. "Close to You" (Leo Graham, Melvin Koen) – 4:04
3. "Why Is It So Hard (To Say You're Sorry)" (Leo Graham, Dennis Miller) – 5:33
4. "You're Too Much" (Leo Graham, Dennis Miller) – 3:47
5. "Put Your Trust in Me" (Leo Graham) – 5:00
6. "Givin' Myself to You" (Leo Graham) – 4:00
7. "Wrong Doers" (Leo Graham) – 4:55
8. "Beware, Beware" (Leo Graham, John Sibley) – 4:25

=== Bonus tracks ===
No.	Title	Length
9.	"Give It Up (Turn It Loose)" (7" single edit)	3:25
10.	"Close to You" (7" single edit)	3:15
11.	"Wrong Doers" (7" single edit)	3:58

== Charts ==
Chart (1976)	Peak position
US Billboard 200	89
US Top R&B/Hip-Hop Albums (Billboard)	12
