= Turning Point! =

Studio album by Tyrone Davis
- Released: 1976
- Recorded: 1975
- Genre: Soul; funk; R&B
- Label: Dakar
- Producer: Leo Graham; Carl Davis; Tom Tom 84

Tyrone Davis chronology
Home Wrecker (1974)	Turning Point! (1976)	Love and Touch (1976)

Singles from Turning Point!
- 1. "Turning Point" Released: 1975; 2. "It's So Good (To Be Home With You)" Released: 1976; 3. "Ever Lovin' Girl" Released: 1976

Professional ratings
Review scores
Source	Rating
AllMusic	3/5 stars

Turning Point! is a Tyrone Davis album released in 1976. This was his final release for Dakar Records. This is the first of two albums by Tyrone Davis in 1976. Love and Touch was released after his move over to Columbia Records.

== Background ==
Primarily produced by Leo Graham with the exception of two songs ("Saving My Love for You" and "Turn Back the Hands of Time"), which were handled by Carl Davis and Tom Tom 84. "Turning Point" was the album's lead single and reached No. 1 on the Billboard Hot Soul Singles chart in February 1976. It was the first number-one soul single to not crossover to the Hot 100 and any Billboard pop singles chart since 1955. It was Davis's last number-one soul/R&B hit. Two follow ups, "It's So Good (To Be Home with You)" and "Ever Lovin' Girl", peaked at Nos. 9 and 39, respectively, on the soul singles chart.

== Track listing ==
1. "It's So Good (To Be Home with You)" (Leo Graham) - 5:16
2. "Turning Point" (Leo Graham) - 4:25
3. "Forever" (Leo Graham) - 4:25
4. "I Can't Bump (Pt.1)" (Instrumental)(Leo Graham) - 3:20
5. "Saving My Love for You" (Sherman Johnson) - 4:34
6. "Ever Lovin' Girl" (Leo Graham, Tyrone Davis, Albert Green) - 2:56
7. "Don't Let It Be Too Late" (Leo Graham, Dennis Miller) - 2:36
8. "I Can't Bump (Pt.2)" (Vocal) (Leo Graham) - 3:00
9. "Turn Back the Hands of Time" (Bonnie Thompson, Jack Daniels) - 4:55

== Charts ==
Chart (1976)	Peak position
US Top R&B/Hip-Hop Albums (Billboard)	10
