= List of Best Selling Soul Singles number ones of 1969 =

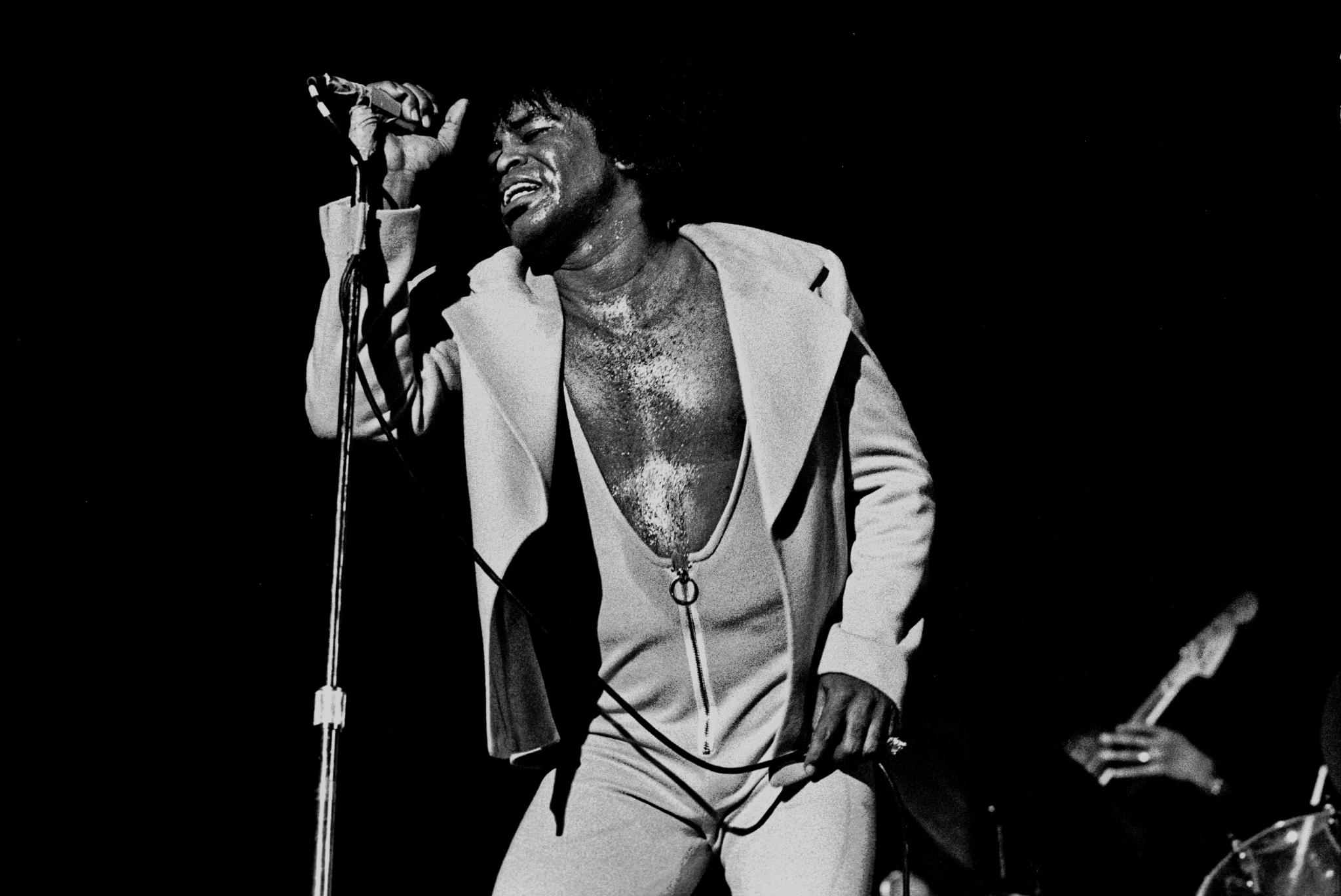
James Brown, known as the "Godfather of Soul", had two number ones in 1969, "Give It Up or Turnit a Loose" and "Mother Popcorn".

Billboard published a weekly chart in 1969 ranking the top-performing singles in the United States in rhythm and blues (R&B), soul, and related African American-oriented music genres; the chart has undergone various name changes over the decades to reflect the evolution of such genres and since 2005 has been published as Hot R&B/Hip-Hop Songs. In 1969, it was published under the title Hot Rhythm & Blues Singles through the issue of Billboard dated August 16 and Best Selling Soul Singles thereafter. During that year, 17 different singles topped the chart.

In the issue of Billboard dated January 4, Marvin Gaye was at number one with "I Heard It Through the Grapevine", the song's fourth week in the top spot. Gaye returned to number one in June with "Too Busy Thinking About My Baby" and was one of three acts to have two number ones in 1969 along with James Brown and the Temptations. Gaye's cumulative total of ten weeks in the top spot was the most achieved by any artist during the year and the six weeks which "Too Busy Thinking About My Baby" spent atop the chart was the year's longest unbroken run at number one. The chart-topping singles of Brown and the Temptations showcased new developments in black music, as Brown's tracks centred on the funk style, which had been developing since the mid-1960s as a harder-edged alternative to soul music and would continue to grow in popularity in the 1970s, and the Temptations brought new elements to their style leading to their identification with the psychedelic soul sub-genre.

Several acts topped the R&B/soul singles chart in 1969 for the first time, beginning with Tyrone Davis, who replaced Marvin Gaye in the top spot in the issue of Billboard dated February 1 with "Can I Change My Mind". The next number one was also a debut chart-topper, as Sly & the Family Stone reached the peak position for the first time with "Everyday People", which also topped the all-genre Hot 100 chart. Sly Stone and his band would prove key in the development of the funk and psychedelic soul sounds in the early 1970s. The Isley Brothers, Joe Simon, and the Originals also gained the first number ones of their careers during 1969. The year's final number one was "Someday We'll Be Together" by Diana Ross & the Supremes, which reached the peak position in the issue of Billboard dated December 13 and stayed there for the remainder of the year. It was the group's last single to feature lead singer Diana Ross, who departed early in 1970 for a highly successful solo career.

== Chart history ==
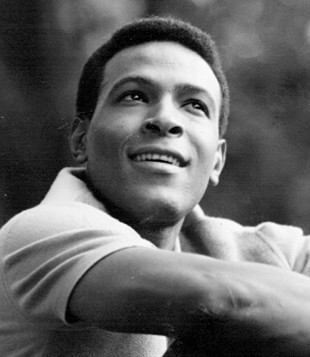
Marvin Gaye had two number ones in 1969.

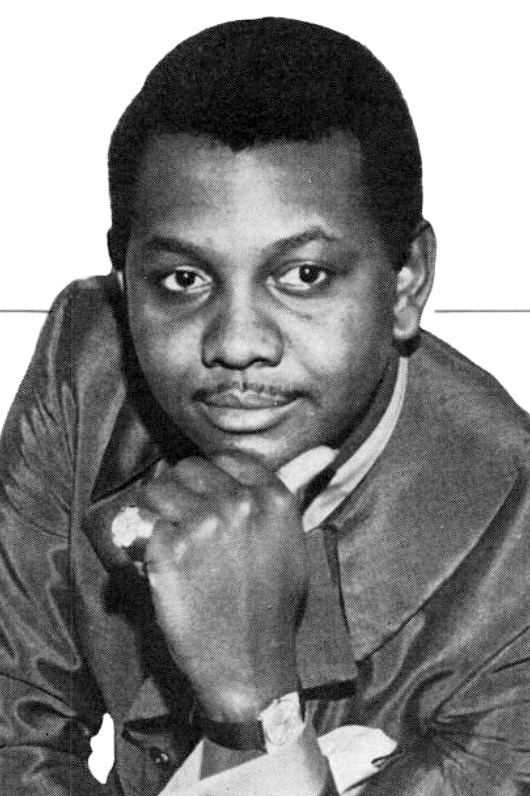
"Can I Change My Mind" was the first chart-topper for Tyrone Davis.

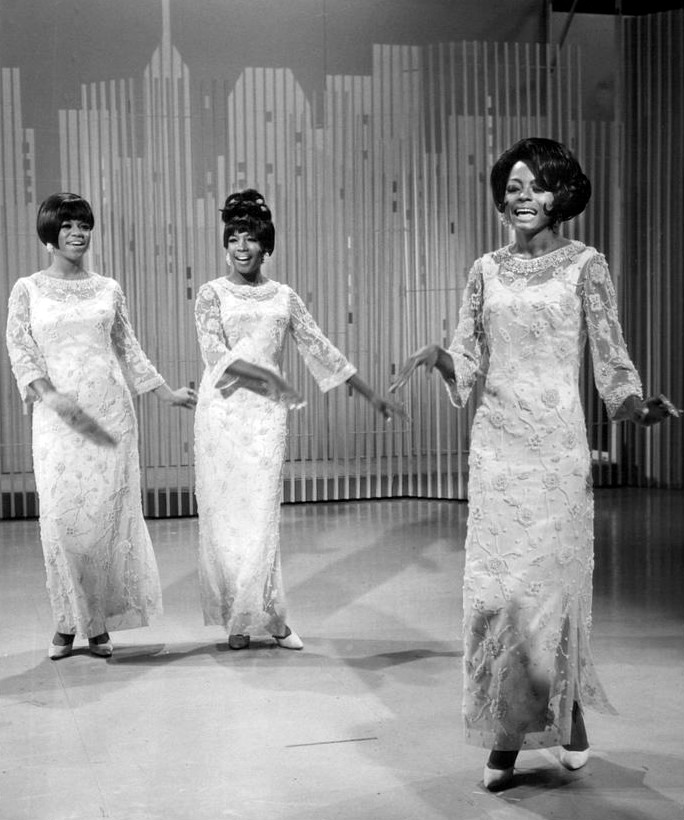
"Someday We'll Be Together" was the final number one for the Supremes to feature lead singer Diana Ross (far right).

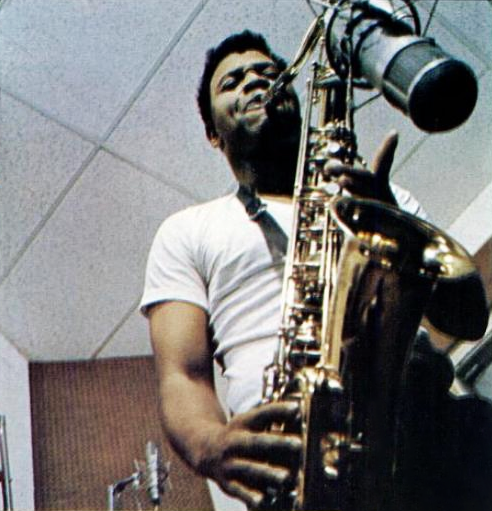
Jr. Walker & the All-Stars topped the chart with "What Does It Take (To Win Your Love)".

Key
†	Indicates number 1 on Billboard's year-end R&B/soul chart of 1969

Chart history
Issue date	Title	Artist(s)	Ref.
January 4	"I Heard It Through the Grapevine"	Marvin Gaye	
January 11	"I Heard It Through the Grapevine"	Marvin Gaye	
January 18	"I Heard It Through the Grapevine"	Marvin Gaye	
January 25	"I Heard It Through the Grapevine"	Marvin Gaye	
February 1	"Can I Change My Mind"	Tyrone Davis	
February 8	"Can I Change My Mind"	Tyrone Davis	
February 15	"Can I Change My Mind"	Tyrone Davis	
February 22	"Everyday People"	Sly & the Family Stone	
March 1	"Everyday People"	Sly & the Family Stone	
March 8	"Give It Up Or Turnit a Loose"	James Brown	
March 15	"Give It Up Or Turnit a Loose"	James Brown	
March 22	"Run Away Child, Running Wild"	The Temptations	
March 29	"Run Away Child, Running Wild"	The Temptations	
April 5	"Only the Strong Survive"	Jerry Butler	
April 12	"Only the Strong Survive"	Jerry Butler	
April 19	"It's Your Thing"	The Isley Brothers	
April 26	"It's Your Thing"	The Isley Brothers	
May 3	"It's Your Thing"	The Isley Brothers	
May 10	"It's Your Thing"	The Isley Brothers	
May 17	"The Chokin' Kind"	Joe Simon	
May 24	"The Chokin' Kind"	Joe Simon	
May 31	"The Chokin' Kind"	Joe Simon	
June 7	"Too Busy Thinking About My Baby"	Marvin Gaye	
June 14	"Too Busy Thinking About My Baby"	Marvin Gaye	
June 21	"Too Busy Thinking About My Baby"	Marvin Gaye	
June 28	"Too Busy Thinking About My Baby"	Marvin Gaye	
July 5	"Too Busy Thinking About My Baby"	Marvin Gaye	
July 12	"Too Busy Thinking About My Baby"	Marvin Gaye	
July 19	"What Does It Take (To Win Your Love)" †	Jr. Walker & the All-Stars	
July 26	"What Does It Take (To Win Your Love)" †	Jr. Walker & the All-Stars	
August 2	"Mother Popcorn (You Got To Have a Mother For Me)"	James Brown	
August 9	"Mother Popcorn (You Got To Have a Mother For Me)"	James Brown	
August 16	"Choice of Colors"	The Impressions	
August 23	"Share Your Love with Me"	Aretha Franklin	
August 30	"Share Your Love with Me"	Aretha Franklin	
September 6	"Share Your Love with Me"	Aretha Franklin	
September 13	"Share Your Love with Me"	Aretha Franklin	
September 20	"Share Your Love with Me"	Aretha Franklin	
September 27	"Oh, What a Night"	The Dells	
October 4	"I Can't Get Next to You"	The Temptations	
October 11	"I Can't Get Next to You"	The Temptations	
October 18	"I Can't Get Next to You"	The Temptations	
October 26	"I Can't Get Next to You"	The Temptations	
November 1	"I Can't Get Next to You"	The Temptations	
November 8	"Baby, I'm for Real"	The Originals	
November 15	"Baby, I'm for Real"	The Originals	
November 22	"Baby, I'm for Real"	The Originals	
November 29	"Baby, I'm for Real"	The Originals	
December 6	"Baby, I'm for Real"	The Originals	
December 13	"Someday We'll Be Together"	Diana Ross & the Supremes	
December 20	"Someday We'll Be Together"	Diana Ross & the Supremes	
December 27	"Someday We'll Be Together"	Diana Ross & the Supremes	
