= In the Mood with Tyrone Davis =

Studio album by Tyrone Davis
- Released: 1979
- Recorded: 1979
- Studios: Universal, Chicago, Illinois
- Genres: Soul; funk; pop; R&B; disco
- Label: Columbia
- Producer: Leo Graham

Tyrone Davis chronology
I Can't Go On This Way (1978)	In the Mood with Tyrone Davis (1979)	Can't You Tell It's Me (1979)

Singles from In the Mood with Tyrone Davis
- 1. "In the Mood" Released: 1979; 2. "All The Love I Need" Released: 1979

In the Mood with Tyrone Davis is a Tyrone Davis album released in 1979. It was his fourth Columbia Records release.

== Critical reception ==
Professional ratings
Review scores
Source	Rating
AllMusic	4.5/5 stars

The Oakland Post wrote that Davis "artfully weaves his way through a beautiful array of ballads, pop tunes and disco funk."

== Singles ==
The album's lead single, "In the Mood", peaked at No. 6 on the Billboard Hot Soul Singles chart. The follow-up, "Ain't Nothing I Can Do", reached No. 72 on the soul singles chart.

== Track listing ==
1. "In the Mood" (Darryl Ellis, Paul Richmond, Ruben Locke Jr.) – 4:12
2. "You Know What to Do" (Leo Graham) – 5:51
3. "I Can't Wait" (Leo Graham) – 3:55
4. "Keep On Dancin'" (Leo Graham, Paul Richmond) – 3:40
5. "I Don't Think You Heard Me" (Eddie Fisher, Leo Graham) – 4:02
6. "Ain't Nothing I Can Do" (Leo Graham, Paul Richmond) – 4:47
7. "All the Love I Need" (Leo Graham, Paul Richmond) – 3:42
8. "We Were in Love Then" (Walter Hatchet) – 4:01

=== Bonus tracks ===
No.	Title	Length
9.	"In the Mood" (single edit)	3:54
10.	"Ain't Nothing I Can Do" (single edit)	3:30

== Personnel ==
- Tyrone Davis – lead vocals
- Calvin Bridges, James Mack – keyboards
- Terry Fryer – synth
- Bernard Reed, Paul Richmond, Ron Harris – bass
- Eddie Fisher, Keith Howard, Morris Jennings, Quinton Joseph, Ruben Locke Jr., Stephen Cobb – drums
- Billy Durham, Charles Colbert, Cynthia Harrell, Darryl Ellis, James Mack, Leo Graham, Mary Ann Stewart, Paul Richmond, Ruben Locke Jr., Vivian Haywood – background vocals
- Steele 'Sonny' Seals* – saxophone
- James Mack – alto flute
- John Avante, Stephen Berry – trombone
- Bobby Lewis, Charles Handy, Lionel Bordelon – trumpet

== Charts ==
Chart performance for In the Mood with Tyrone Davis
Chart (1979)	Peak position
US Billboard 200	115
US Top R&B/Hip-Hop Albums (Billboard)	9
