= Turn Back the Hands of Time =

- Swedish vinyl single

Single by Tyrone Davis

from the album Turn Back the Hands of Time
- B-side: "I Keep Coming Back"
- Released: February 1970
- Recorded: January 23, 1970
- Studio: Universal, Chicago
- Genre: Soul
- Length: 2:35
- Label: Dakar
- Songwriters: Jack Daniels; Bonnie Thompson
- Producer: Willie Henderson

Tyrone Davis singles chronology
"Is It Something You've Got" (1969)	"Turn Back the Hands of Time" (1970)	"I'll Be Right Here" (1970)

Bruce Springsteen singles chronology
"Don't Play That Song" (2022)	"Turn Back the Hands of Time" (2022)	"Streets of Minneapolis" (2026)

"Turn Back the Hands of Time" is a song recorded by the American R&B singer Tyrone Davis. It was co-written by Jack Daniels and Johnny Moore, a.k.a. John Edward Moore (credited to Moore’s girlfriend at the time, Bonnie Thompson), and produced by Willie Henderson.

"Turn Back the Hands of Time" was released as a single in February 1970 and became Davis's second major hit, spending two weeks at number one on Billboard's R&B Singles chart and reaching number three on its Pop chart. The single was also certified gold by the RIAA for sales of one million copies. "Turn Back the Hands of Time" is from the album of the same name that MTV says "ranks among the best soul LPs of its time". Bruce Springsteen covered the song on his 2022 studio album, Only the Strong Survive.

== Background ==
Daniels and Moore wrote "Turn Back the Hands of Time" based on relationship problems Moore was having at the time. Daniels had co-written Davis's 1968 hit "Can I Change My Mind" and the recording session for "Turn Back the Hands of Time" included some of the same musicians from that session.

== Chart history ==
=== Weekly charts ===
Chart (1970)	Peak position
US Billboard Hot 100	3
US Billboard R&B	1
US Cash Box Top 100	4

=== Year-end charts ===
Chart (1970)	Rank
US Billboard Hot 100	51
US Cash Box	32

== Personnel ==
- Background vocals by Barbara Acklin, Eugene Record & Robert Lester
- Bass guitar by Billy Robinson
- Drums by Quinton Joseph
- Guitar by Carl Woolfolk
- Keyboards by Floyd Morris
- Lead vocals by Tyrone Davis
- Written by Jack Daniels & Johnny Moore(credited to Bonnie Thompson)
- Produced by Willie Henderson
- Arranged by Tom-Tom Washington

== Other versions ==
- Checkmates, Ltd. on their 1971 album, Life.
- Otis Clay 7" on Elka Records 1975.
- Bruce Springsteen on his 2022 album, Only the Strong Survive.

== Use in media ==
The song appears in the film Nine Months (1995).
