= I Just Can't Keep On Going =

Studio album by Tyrone Davis
- Released: 1980
- Recorded: 1980
- Studio: Universal, Chicago, Illinois
- Genre: Soul, R&B
- Label: Columbia
- Producer: Leo Graham

Tyrone Davis chronology
Can't You Tell It's Me (1979)	I Just Can't Keep On Going (1980)	Everything in Place (1981)

Singles from I Just Can't Keep On Going
- 1. "How Sweet It Is (To Be Loved by You)" Released: 1980

Professional ratings
Review scores
Source	Rating
AllMusic	3/5 stars

I Just Can't Keep On Going is an album by the American musician Tyrone Davis, released in 1980. It was his sixth Columbia Records release.

== Singles ==
The cover of the Marvin Gaye song "How Sweet It Is (To Be Loved by You)" reached No. 36 on the Billboard Hot Soul Singles chart in 1980.

== Track listing ==
1. "How Sweet It Is (To Be Loved By You)" – 4:05
2. "I Just Can't Keep On Going" – 3:35
3. "I'm Glad You're Here with Me Tonight" – 4:31
4. "Overdue" – 4:02
5. "Comin' Back Baby" – 4:40
6. "We Don't Need No Music" – 5:15
7. "Never Stopped Loving You" – 3:52
8. "Wanna Make It Good" – 4:58

== Personnel ==
- Tyrone Davis – lead vocals
- Byron Gregory, Danny Leake, Herb Walker, Pat Ferreri – guitar
- Paul Richmond – guitar, bass
- Bernard Reed – bass
- Aventino Calvetti, Steve Rodby – bass (string)
- Morris Jennings, Ruben Locke – drums
- Charles Kalimba-Ki, Geraldo de Oliveira – percussion
- Calvin Bridges – organ
- Bernadene Davis, Billy Durham, Cynthia Harrell, Francine Smith, James Mack, Jo Ann Brown-El, Leo Graham, Wales Wallace – background vocals
- Barbara Haffner, William Cernota, Elaine Mack, Karl Fruh – cello
- Albert Smith, Kaye Clements, Steele Seals – saxophone
- Elmer Brown, Paul Howard, Peter Harvey – trumpet
- Daniel Strba, Martin Abrams, Rami Solomonow, Susan Dickstein – viola
- Adrian Gola, Arnold Ruth, Barbara Breckman, Carol Weiss, Darrell Bloch, David Hildner, Edward Green, Edmund Lee Bauer, Elliott Golub, Everett Zlatoff-Mirsky, Hilel Kagan, Phyllis McKenny, Raya Kodesh, Roger Moulton, Sol Bobrov – violin

== Charts ==
Chart (1980)	Peak position
US Top R&B/Hip-Hop Albums (Billboard)	39
