= Turning Point (song) =

"Turning Point (Tyrone Davis song)"

Song by Tyrone Davis

from the album Turning Point!
- B-side: "Don't Let It Be Too Late"
- Released: 1975
- Label: Dakar
- Songwriter(s): Leo Graham
- Producer(s): Leo Graham

Tyrone Davis singles chronology
"A Woman Needs to Be Loved" (1975)	"Turning Point (Tyrone Davis song)" (1975)	"So Good (To Be Home with You)" (1976)

"Turning Point" is a 1976 song by R&B singer Tyrone Davis, written and produced by Leo Graham. It was released on Davis' 1976 album Turning Point!.

"Turning Point" spent a week at number one on the R&B singles chart in February of that year, but did not chart at all on the Billboard Hot 100; it was the first number one soul single to not cross over to the Hot 100 and any Billboard pop singles chart since 1955. The single was Davis' last number one single on the R&B chart.

== Cover versions ==
- A cover of the song by Mighty Joe Young is featured in the movie Thief.
- David Lindley and El Rayo X covered "Turning Point" on the album Win This Record.
- Big Twist and the Mellow Fellows covered "Turning Point" on their album Live in Chicago!.
