= Let's Be Closer Together =

Studio album by Tyrone Davis
- Released: 1977
- Recorded: 1977
- Genres: Soul; R&B
- Label: Columbia
- Producer: Leo Graham

Tyrone Davis chronology
| Love and Touch (1976) | Let's Be Closer Together (1977) | I Can't Go On This Way (1978) |

Singles from Let's Be Closer Together
- 1. "This I Swear" Released: 1977; 2. "All You Got" Released: 1977

Let's Be Closer Together is an album by Tyrone Davis, released in 1977. It was his second Columbia Records release. It was remastered and expanded through Funkytowngrooves in 2015.

== Singles ==
The album's lead single, "This I Swear", reached No. 6 on the Billboard Hot Soul Singles chart, while the follow-up, "All You Got", peaked at No. 32 on the same chart.

== Critical reception ==
Professional ratings
Review scores
| Source | Rating |
|---|---|
| AllMusic | 3/5 stars |
| The Encyclopedia of Popular Music | 2/5 stars |
| The New Rolling Stone Record Guide | 2/5 stars |

Billboard wrote that Davis "provides a particularly neat package of pleasing material delivered in his roguishly appealing bad-little-boy style."

== Track listing ==
1. "All You Got" (Leo Graham) – 6:06
2. "I Just Can't Keep On Going" (James Mack, Leo Graham) - 4:34
3. "If That's What It Takes" (Leo Graham) - 4:28
4. "Playing in the Sand" (Leo Graham) - 5:22
5. "This I Swear" (Leo Graham) - 5:55
6. "I Got Carried Away" (Leo Graham) - 5:02
7. "You Need Love" (Leo Graham) - 3:33
8. "Let's Be Closer Together" (James Mack, Leo Graham)- 5:41

Bonus tracks

| No. | Title | Length |
|---|---|---|
| 9. | "This I Swear" (7" single edit) | 3:38 |
| 10. | "All You Got" (7" single edit) | 3:44 |

== Charts ==
| Chart (1977) | Peak position |
|---|---|
| US Top R&B/Hip-Hop Albums (Billboard) | 17 |
