= I Can't Go On This Way =

Studio album by Tyrone Davis
- Released: 1978
- Recorded: 1978
- Studios: P.S. (Chicago, Illinois)
- Genres: Soul; R&B; disco
- Label: Columbia
- Producer: Leo Graham

Tyrone Davis chronology
Let's Be Closer Together (1977)	I Can't Go On This Way (1978)	In the Mood with Tyrone Davis (1979)

Singles from I Can't Go On This Way
- 1. "Get On Up (Disco)" Released: 1978; 2. "Can't Help But Say" Released: 1978

Professional ratings
Review scores
Source	Rating
AllMusic	3/5 stars

I Can't Go On This Way is an album by the American musician Tyrone Davis, released in 1978. It was his third Columbia Records release.

== Singles ==
Two singles were released. The lead single, "Get On Up (Disco)", reached No. 12 on the Billboard Hot Soul Singles chart, while the follow-up, "Can't Help But Say", peaked at No. 65 on the same chart.

== Track listing ==
1. "Get On Up Disco" – 9:58
2. "All I Ever Need" – 4:29
3. "Bunky" – 5:06
4. "I Can't Go On This Way" – 4:39
5. "Can't Help But Say" – 4:10
6. "It's You It's You" – 3:13
7. "I'm Still in Love with You" – 3:29
8. "Do You Feel It" – 4:58

== Personnel ==
- Tyrone Davis – lead vocals
- Tennyson Stephens – keyboards
- Bernard Reed – bass
- Danny Leake, John Bishop, Melvin Taylor – guitar
- Quinton Joseph – drums, percussion
- Henry Gibson – congas, bongos
- Gloria Graham, The Haywood Singers, Wales Wallace – backing vocals
- Cliff Davis, Fred Entesari, Ronald Wilson, Steele Seals, Willie Henderson – saxophone
- John Avent, Morris Ellie, Steve Berry – trombone
- Clyde Bordelon, Elmer Brown, Murray Watson, Norval Hodges – trumpet
- James Mack, Kaye Clement – flute
- Carol Stephenson – oboe
- Aventine Calvetti – strings (bass)
- Bobby Christian – vibraphone
- Elaine Mack, Kenneth Slowik, Robert Guastafeste – cello
- Gail Williams, Maurice Grice, Thomas Still, William Klingelhoffer – French horn
- Gerasim Warutian, Lee Lene, Solomonov Rami – viola
- Barbara Breckman, Christine Haarvig, Danny Burgess, Deborah Miller, Edward Green, Edmund Baurer*, Elaine Fohrman, Faye Christensen, Mark Feldman, Philip Hilson, Roger James, Sallie LeVerenz, Virginia Graham – violins

== Charts ==
Chart performance for I Can't Go On This Way
Chart (1978)	Peak position
US Top R&B/Hip-Hop Albums (Billboard)	18
