= Can't You Tell It's Me =

Studio album by Tyrone Davis
- Released: 1979
- Recorded: 1979
- Studio: Universal, Chicago, Illinois
- Genre: Soul; R&B
- Label: Columbia
- Producer: Leo Graham

Tyrone Davis chronology
In the Mood with Tyrone Davis (1979)	Can't You Tell It's Me (1979)	I Just Can't Keep On Going (1980)

Singles from Can't You Tell It's Me
- 1. "Be With Me" Released: 1979; 2. "Can't You Tell It's Me" Released: 1980

Professional ratings
Review scores
Source	Rating
AllMusic	3/5 stars
Bay State Banner	B−
The Virgin Encyclopedia of R&B and Soul	2/5 stars

Can't You Tell It's Me is a Tyrone Davis album released in 1979. It was his fifth Columbia Records release and the second of 1979, with In the Mood with Tyrone Davis being released earlier in the year.

== Singles ==
Two singles were released from the album. "Be with You", which reached No. 37 on the Billboard Hot Soul Singles chart in 1979, and the title track, which peaked at No. 58 on the same chart in 1980.

== Track listing ==
1. "Can't You Tell It's Me" (Leo Graham) – 4:16
2. "Be with Me" (Leo Graham, Paul Richmond, Ruben Locke Jr.) – 6:04
3. "Heart Failure" (Leo Graham, Paul Richmond) – 7:17
4. "Burnin' Up" (Leo Graham, Paul Richmond) – 6:03
5. "Love You Forever" (Leo Graham) – 6:44
6. "Really Gonna Miss You" (Leo Graham, Eddie Fisher) – 5:10

== Personnel ==
- Tyrone Davis – lead vocals
- Byron Gregory, Danny Leake, Herb Walker, Pat Ferreri – guitar
- Paul Richmond – guitar, bass
- Morris Jennings – drums
- Handy Bobby Christian, Charles Kalimba-Ki, Geraldo de Oliveira – percussion
- Vince Willis – clarinet
- Billy Durham, Cinnamon, Maurice "Butch" Stewart, Wales Wallace, Wesley Stovall – background vocals

== Charts ==
Chart performance for Can't You Tell It's Me
Chart (1979)	Peak position
US Top R&B/Hip-Hop Albums (Billboard)	40
