= List of Record World number-one albums of 1968 =

These are the Record World number-one albums of 1968.

== Chart history ==
Issue date	Album	Artist(s)	Label
January 6	Magical Mystery Tour	The Beatles / Soundtrack	Capitol
January 13	Magical Mystery Tour	The Beatles / Soundtrack	Capitol
January 20	Magical Mystery Tour	The Beatles / Soundtrack	Capitol
January 27	Magical Mystery Tour	The Beatles / Soundtrack	Capitol
February 3	Magical Mystery Tour	The Beatles / Soundtrack	Capitol
February 10	Magical Mystery Tour	The Beatles / Soundtrack	Capitol
February 17	Magical Mystery Tour	The Beatles / Soundtrack	Capitol
February 24	John Wesley Harding	Bob Dylan	Columbia
March 2	Blooming Hits	Paul Mauriat and His Orchestra	Philips
March 9	Blooming Hits	Paul Mauriat and His Orchestra	Philips
March 16	Blooming Hits	Paul Mauriat and His Orchestra	Philips
March 23	Blooming Hits	Paul Mauriat and His Orchestra	Philips
March 30	Blooming Hits	Paul Mauriat and His Orchestra	Philips
April 6	Blooming Hits	Paul Mauriat and His Orchestra	Philips
April 13	The Graduate	Simon & Garfunkel / Soundtrack	Columbia
April 20	The Graduate	Simon & Garfunkel / Soundtrack	Columbia
April 27	The Graduate	Simon & Garfunkel / Soundtrack	Columbia
May 4	The Graduate	Simon & Garfunkel / Soundtrack	Columbia
May 11	The Graduate	Simon & Garfunkel / Soundtrack	Columbia
May 18	The Graduate	Simon & Garfunkel / Soundtrack	Columbia
May 25	Bookends	Simon & Garfunkel	Columbia
June 1	Bookends	Simon & Garfunkel	Columbia
June 8	Bookends	Simon & Garfunkel	Columbia
June 15	Bookends	Simon & Garfunkel	Columbia
June 22	Bookends	Simon & Garfunkel	Columbia
June 29	Bookends	Simon & Garfunkel	Columbia
July 6	The Beat of the Brass	Herb Alpert and the Tijuana Brass	A&M
July 13	The Beat of the Brass	Herb Alpert and the Tijuana Brass	A&M
July 20	The Beat of the Brass	Herb Alpert and the Tijuana Brass	A&M
July 27	The Beat of the Brass	Herb Alpert and the Tijuana Brass	A&M
August 3	Wheels of Fire	Cream	Atco
August 10	Wheels of Fire	Cream	Atco
August 17	Wheels of Fire	Cream	Atco
August 24	Time Peace: The Rascals' Greatest Hits	The Rascals	Atlantic
August 31	Waiting for the Sun	The Doors	Elektra
September 7	Waiting for the Sun	The Doors	Elektra
September 14	Waiting for the Sun	The Doors	Elektra
September 21	Waiting for the Sun	The Doors	Elektra
September 28	Cheap Thrills	Big Brother and the Holding Company	Columbia
October 5	Cheap Thrills	Big Brother and the Holding Company	Columbia
October 12	Cheap Thrills	Big Brother and the Holding Company	Columbia
October 19	Cheap Thrills	Big Brother and the Holding Company	Columbia
October 26	Feliciano!	Jose Feliciano	
November 2	Electric Ladyland	Jimi Hendrix Experience	Reprise
November 9	Electric Ladyland	Jimi Hendrix Experience	Reprise
November 16	Electric Ladyland	Jimi Hendrix Experience	Reprise
November 23	Electric Ladyland	Jimi Hendrix Experience	Reprise
November 30	Cheap Thrills	Big Brother and the Holding Company	Columbia
December 7	Cheap Thrills	Big Brother and the Holding Company	Columbia
December 14	The Beatles (The White Album)	The Beatles	Apple
December 21	The Beatles (The White Album)	The Beatles	Apple
December 28	The Beatles (The White Album)	The Beatles	Apple
