= Can I Change My Mind =

1968 debut single by Tyrone Davis

Single by Tyrone Davis

from the album Can I Change My Mind
- A-side: "A Woman Needs to Be Loved"
- Released: November 1968
- Recorded: 1968
- Genre: Soul
- Label: Dakar
- Songwriters: Barry Despenza, Carl Wolfolk
- Producer: Willie Henderson

Tyrone Davis singles chronology
"Can I Change My Mind" (1968)	"Is It Something You've Got" (1969)

"Can I Change My Mind" is a 1968 single recorded by soul singer Tyrone Davis, his featured debut. The song hit number one on the Billboard Hot R&B Singles chart on February 1, 1969, replacing Marvin Gaye's "I Heard It through the Grapevine". It peaked at number five on the Hot 100, and reached RIAA Certified Gold status on February 24, 1969.

The song is featured in the Larry Clark film Another Day in Paradise (1998).

== Other versions ==
The song has been covered by Roy Buchanan, Billy Price, Boz Scaggs (on his 2013 album Memphis), Michael McDonald (on his 2008 album Soul Speak), Delbert McClinton (on his 1992 album Never Been Rocked Enough), the Pietasters, Alton Ellis, and others.

In 1999, the backing track of the song was sampled by the Italian singer Piotta, for his song called "Supercafone".

== Chart history ==
Chart performance for "Can I Change My Mind"
Chart (1968–1969)	Peak position
Billboard Hot 100	5
US Billboard Hot Rhythm & Blues Singles	1
