= Tyrone Davis =

American blues and soul singer (1937–2005)

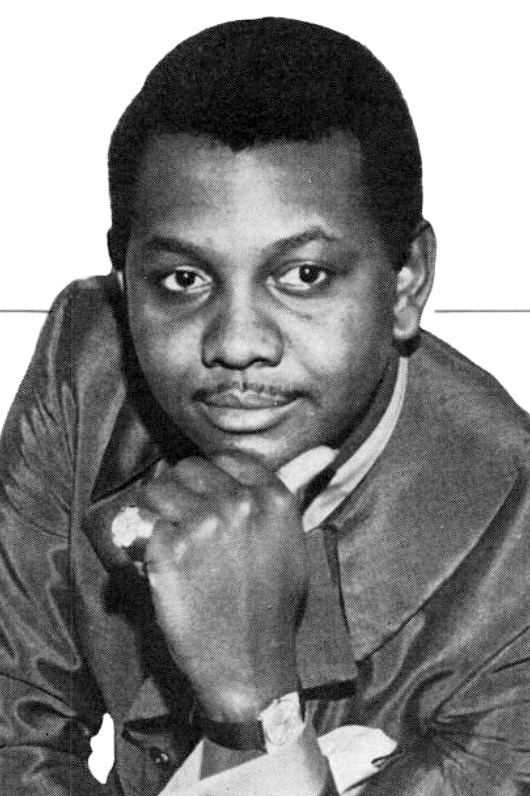
- Davis, 1970.

Background information
- Also known as: TD
- Born: Tyrone D. Fettson or Tyrone D. Branch; October 3, 1937; Greenville, Mississippi, U.S.
- Origin: Chicago, Illinois, U.S.
- Died: February 9, 2005 (aged 67) Hinsdale, Illinois, U.S.
- Genres: Blues; soul; R&B; Chicago soul
- Occupation: Singer
- Instrument: Vocals
- Years active: 1968–2003
- Labels: Dakar; Columbia; Highrise; Ocean Front; Future; Ichiban; Malaco

Tyrone Davis (born Tyrone D. Fettson or Tyrone D. Branch, October 3, 1937 – February 9, 2005) (although many sources have his date of birth as May 4, 1938) was an American blues and soul singer with a long list of hit records over more than 20 years. Davis had three number 1 hits on the Billboard R&B chart: "Can I Change My Mind" (1968), "Turn Back the Hands of Time" (1970), and "Turning Point" (1975).

== Biography ==
Tyrone Fettson was born in Greenville, Mississippi, United States, to Willie Branch and Ora Lee Jones. Some sources give his date of birth as May 4, 1938, but researchers Bob Eagle and Eric LeBlanc state that his funeral notice gives the October 1937 date.

He moved with his father to Saginaw, Michigan, before moving to Chicago in 1959. Working as a valet/chauffeur for blues singer Freddie King, he started singing in local clubs where he was discovered by record executive/musician Harold Burrage. His early records for small record labels in the city, billed as "Tyrone the Wonder Boy", failed to register. Successful Chicago record producer Carl Davis signed him in 1968 to a new label, Dakar Records, that he was starting as part of a distribution deal with Atlantic, and suggested that Tyrone change his name, which he did by borrowing Carl's last name.

His first release, "A Woman Needs to Be Loved" was flipped when the B-side started to get radio attention. The song, "Can I Change My Mind" featured a change of vocal style for Davis with a softer, more pleading approach and tone. The record shot up the listings and spent three weeks on the top of the Billboard R&B chart, while climbing to number 5 in the Hot 100. It sold over one million and received gold disc recognition. His biggest hit came in early 1970 when "Turn Back The Hands Of Time" also reached number 1 in the R&B chart and went up to number 3 in the Hot 100 pop chart. Written by Jack Daniels and Bonnie Thompson, this disc also sold over one million copies, and received a gold disc awarded by the Recording Industry Association of America in May 1970.

Davis released about 25 singles during his seven years with Dakar, most of them big R&B sellers produced by Willie Henderson. He finally returned to the top spot with "Turning Point" in 1975. Soon afterwards, Davis switched to the major Columbia record label and recorded seven albums over the next five years with producer Leo Graham and arranger James Mack who had collaborated with him for "Turning Point." Major hits with Columbia included "Give It Up" (number 2), "This I Swear" (number 6), and "In the Mood" (number 6). Dubbed the "king of romantic Chicago soul" by MTV, Davis' perceived vulnerability and class endeared him to female soul fans through the 1970s.

1982 brought a change of label to the newly established independent, Highrise and another major hit, "Are You Serious" (number 3 R&B, number 57 pop), again produced by Leo Graham, and written by L.V. Johnson. When Highrise closed the following year, Davis switched to a tiny Los Angeles label, Ocean Front, which lacked promotional muscle to get behind arguably one of his best performances, "Let Me Be Your Pacifier." In 1991, Davis switched to Atlanta label, Ichiban Records, recording three albums including the song "Mom's Apple Pie." In 1994, Davis went to Bellmark/Life Records for one album. Davis' days as a major chart act were over, but he continued to be a popular live attraction and finally signed in 1996 with Malaco Records, the southern-based blues label recording him on a number of albums. He also performed on a PBS special on 1970s soul music in 2004, singing "Turn Back the Hands of Time."

A stroke in September 2004 ended his career and, following complications, he died in a Chicago hospital on February 9, 2005, at the age of 67.

== Discography ==
=== Studio albums ===
| Year | Album | Chart positions | | Record label |
| Year | Album | US | US R&B | Record label |
|---|---|---|---|---|
| 1969 | Can I Change My Mind | 146 | 12 | Dakar |
| 1970 | Turn Back the Hands of Time | 90 | 9 | Dakar |
| 1972 | I Had It All the Time | 182 | 42 | Dakar |
| 1973 | Without You in My Life | 174 | 24 | Dakar |
| 1973 | It's All in the Game | — | 28 | Dakar |
| 1974 | Home Wrecker | — | 55 | Dakar |
| 1976 | Turning Point! | — | 10 | Dakar |
| 1976 | Love and Touch | 89 | 12 | Columbia |
| 1977 | Let's Be Closer Together | — | 17 | Columbia |
| 1978 | I Can't Go On This Way | — | 18 | Columbia |
| 1979 | In the Mood with Tyrone Davis | 115 | 9 | Columbia |
| 1979 | Can't You Tell It's Me | — | 40 | Columbia |
| 1980 | I Just Can't Keep on Going | — | 39 | Columbia |
| 1981 | Everything in Place | — | 74 | Columbia |
| 1982 | T.D. | 137 | 10 | Highrise |
| 1983 | Something Good | — | 46 | Ocean-Front |
| 1985 | Sexy Thing | — | — | Future |
| 1987 | Man of Stone | — | 78 | Future |
| 1988 | Flashin' Back | — | 37 | Future |
| 1990 | Come on Over | — | — | Future |
| 1991 | I'll Always Love You | — | 39 | Ichiban |
| 1992 | Something's Mighty Wrong | — | 53 | Ichiban |
| 1994 | For the Good Times | — | 88 | Life |
| 1996 | Simply | — | 85 | Malaco |
| 1997 | Pleasing You | — | — | Malaco |
| 1999 | Call Tyrone | — | 85 | Malaco |
| 2000 | Relaxin' with Tyrone | — | 71 | Malaco |
| 2002 | Love Line | — | — | Malaco |
| 2003 | Come to Daddy | — | 42 | Future |
| 2004 | The Legendary Hall Of Famer | — | 94 | Endzone Entertainment |
"—" denotes that the album failed to chart

=== Singles ===
| Year | Single | Chart Positions | | Record label |
| Year | Single | US Pop | US R&B | Record label |
|---|---|---|---|---|
| 1968 | "Can I Change My Mind" | 5 | 1 | Dakar |
| 1969 | "Is It Something You've Got" | 34 | 5 | Dakar |
| 1970 | "Turn Back the Hands of Time" | 3 | 1 | Dakar |
| 1970 | "I'll Be Right Here" | 53 | 8 | Dakar |
| 1970 | "Let Me Back In" | 58 | 12 | Dakar |
| 1971 | "Could I Forget You" | 60 | 10 | Dakar |
| 1971 | "One-Way Ticket" | 75 | 18 | Dakar |
| 1971 | "You Keep Me Holding On" | 94 | 15 | Dakar |
| 1972 | "I Had It All the Time" | 61 | 5 | Dakar |
| 1972 | "Was I Just a Fool" | — | 26 | Dakar |
| 1972 | "If You Had a Change in Mind" | 107 | 28 | Dakar |
| 1973 | "Without You in My Life" | 64 | 5 | Dakar |
| 1973 | "There It Is" | 32 | 9 | Dakar |
| 1973 | "Wrapped Up in Your Warm and Tender Love" | — | 19 | Dakar |
| 1974 | "I Wish It Was Me" | 57 | 11 | Dakar |
| 1974 | "What Goes Up (Must Come Down)" | 89 | 11 | Dakar |
| 1974 | "Happiness Is Being with You" | — | 27 | Dakar |
| 1974 | "I Can't Make It Without You" | — | 38 | Dakar |
| 1975 | "Homewreckers" | — | 36 | Dakar |
| 1975 | "A Woman Needs to Be Loved" | — | 38 | Dakar |
| 1975 | "Turning Point" | — | 1 | Dakar |
| 1976 | "So Good (To Be Home with You)" | — | 9 | Dakar |
| 1976 | "Give It Up (Turn It Loose)" | 38 | 2 | Columbia |
| 1976 | "Ever Lovin' Girl" | — | 39 | Dakar |
| 1977 | "Close to You" | — | 33 | Columbia |
| 1977 | "This I Swear" | 102 | 6 | Columbia |
| 1977 | "All You Got" | — | 32 | Columbia |
| 1978 | "Get On Up (Disco)" | 102 | 12 | Columbia |
| 1978 | "Can't Help But Say" | — | 65 | Columbia |
| 1979 | "In the Mood" | — | 6 | Columbia |
| 1979 | "Ain't Nothing I Can Do" | — | 72 | Columbia |
| 1979 | "Be with Me" | — | 37 | Columbia |
| 1980 | "Can't You Tell It's Me" | — | 58 | Columbia |
| 1980 | "How Sweet It Is (To Be Loved by You)" | — | 36 | Columbia |
| 1981 | "Just My Luck" | — | 62 | Columbia |
| 1982 | "Are You Serious" | 57 | 3 | Highrise |
| 1983 | "A Little Bit of Loving (Goes a Long Way)" | — | 49 | Highrise |
| 1983 | "I Found Myself When I Lost You" | — | 38 | Ocean Front |
| 1984 | "Let Me Be Your Pacifier" | — | 33 | Ocean Front |
| 1987 | "I'm in Love Again" | — | 84 | Future |
| 1988 | "Do You Feel It" | — | 54 | Future |
| 1988 | "It's a Miracle" | — | 32 | Future |
| 1988 | "Flashin' Back" | — | 61 | Future |
"—" denotes that the single failed to chart
