= Dakar Records =

American record label (1967–1976)

Dakar Records (1967–1976) was a record label started by Carl Davis in 1967, while employed at Brunswick Records. The label was initially distributed by Atlantic Records subsidiary Cotillion Records and was based in Chicago. All releases after late 1971 were distributed by Brunswick Records.

Notable artists on the imprint included Tyrone Davis, Hamilton Bohannon, and Sidney Joe Qualls. Dakar also released LPs by Boobie Knight and the Universal Lady, Even Stevens, Johnny Sayles, Prophets of Soul, and Mighty Doug Haynes.

When Brunswick/Dakar went dormant, Davis founded Chi-Sound Records.

Owned by Brunswick today, the Dakar catalog is currently distributed by Koch Entertainment.
