= Leo Graham (songwriter) =

American songwriter and record producer (born 1941)

- Born: Leo Graham Jr. 1941 (age 84–85); Stuttgart, Arkansas, U.S.
- Origin: Chicago, Illinois, U.S.
- Occupations: Songwriter; record producer

Leo Graham Jr. (born 1941) is an American Chicago-based songwriter and producer who had a string of hits with Tyrone Davis. He was nominated for Grammy Award for Best R&B Song at 23rd Annual Grammy Awards for "Shining Star"

== Songs ==
- "Turning Point"
- "Shining Star (The Manhattans song)"
