= The Very Best of Jackie Wilson =

Greatest hits album by Jackie Wilson
- Released: 1987; Re-released: February 4, 1993
- Recorded: 1957–1972
- Genre: R&B
- Length: 62:35
- Label: Ace

Jackie Wilson chronology
The Very Best of Jackie Wilson (1987)	Mr. Excitement! (1992)

Professional ratings
Review scores
Source	Rating
AllMusic	5/5 stars

The Very Best of Jackie Wilson is a 1987 greatest hits album by Jackie Wilson. It was re-released in 1993.

== Track listing ==
1. "Reet Petite (The Finest Girl You Ever Want to Meet)" (Berry Gordy, Tyran Carlo, Gwen Gordy) – 2:46
2. "Lonely Teardrops" (B. Gordy, Carlo, G. Gordy) – 2:40
3. "To Be Loved" (B. Gordy, Carlo, G. Gordy) – 2:30
4. "That's Why (I Love You So)" (B. Gordy, Carlo, G. Gordy) – 2:05
5. "I'll Be Satisfied" (B. Gordy, Carlo, G. Gordy) – 2:03
6. "Doggin' Around" (Lena Agree) – 2:48
7. "Lonely Life" (Al Kasha, Alan Thomas) – 2:28
8. "Night" (Johnny Lehmann, Herb Miller) – 2:47
9. "You Better Know It" (Jackie Wilson, Norm Henry) – 1:58
10. "Talk That Talk" (Sid Wyche) – 2:14
11. "Am I the Man" (Bob Hamilton, Tom King) – 2:34
12. "I'm Comin' on Back to You" (Kasha, Horace Ott) – 2:15
13. "A Woman, a Lover, a Friend" (Wyche) – 2:32
14. "Baby Workout" (Wilson, Alonzo Tucker) – 2:57
15. "Squeeze Her - Tease Her (But Love Her)" (Wilson, Tucker) – 1:59
16. "No Pity (In the Naked City)" (Wilson, Tucker, Johnny Roberts) – 3:29
17. "Whispers (Gettin' Louder)" (Barbara Acklin, David Scott) – 2:18
18. "I Get the Sweetest Feeling" (Van McCoy, Alicia Evelyn) – 2:53
19. "Since You Showed Me How to Be Happy" (Gary Jackson, Floyd Smith, Gerald Sims) – 2:40
20. "Love Is Funny That Way" (F. Smith, Ritchie Tufano) – 3:06
21. "Just Be Sincere" (Bernard Reed, Danny Reed, Othie Wright) – 2:50
22. "(Your Love Keeps Lifting Me) Higher and Higher" (Carl Smith, Raynard Miner, Jackson) – 2:57
23. "You Got Me Walking" (Eugene Record) – 2:39
24. "(I Can Feel Those Vibrations) This Love Is Real" (Johnny Moore, Jack Daniels) – 2:52
