= Jackie Wilson discography =

This is a discography of American singer Jackie Wilson.

== Albums ==
=== Studio albums ===
Title	Year	Peak chart positions	
Title	Year	US	US R&B
He's So Fine	1958	—	—N/a
Lonely Teardrops	1959	—	—N/a
So Much	1959	—	—N/a
Jackie Sings the Blues	1960	—	—N/a
A Woman, a Lover, a Friend	1960	—	—N/a
You Ain't Heard Nothin' Yet	1961	—	—N/a
By Special Request	1961	—	—N/a
Body and Soul	1962	—	—N/a
Jackie Wilson at the Copa	1962	—	—N/a
Jackie Wilson Sings the World's Greatest Melodies	1963	—	—N/a
Baby Workout	1963	78	—N/a
Shake a Hand (with Linda Hopkins)	1963	—	—N/a
Somethin' Else!	1964	—	—N/a
Soul Time	1965	—	—N/a
Spotlight on Jackie Wilson!	1965	—	—N/a
Soul Galore	1966	—	—N/a
Whispers	1966	108	15
Higher and Higher	1967	163	28
Manufacturers of Soul (with Count Basie)	1968	—	—
I Get the Sweetest Feeling	1968	—	—
Do Your Thing	1969	—	50
This Love is Real	1970	—	—
You Got Me Walkin'	1971	—	—
Beautiful Day	1973	—	—
Nobody But You	1976	—	—
"—" denotes releases that did not chart.

=== Compilation albums ===
- 1960: My Golden Favorites
- 1964: My Golden Favorites, Vol. 2
- 1969: Jackie Wilson's Greatest Hits (#43 R&B)
- 1983: The Jackie Wilson Story
- 1987: The Very Best of Jackie Wilson (re-released in 1993)
- 1992: Mr. Excitement!
- 2005: The Essential Jackie Wilson
- 2006: The Ultimate Jackie Wilson
- 2019: Gold

== Charting singles ==
=== 1950s ===
Titles (A-side, B-side)	Year	Peak chart positions						Certifications	Album
Titles (A-side, B-side)	Year	US	US R&B	AUS	BEL (FL)	NL	UK	Certifications	Album
"Reet Petite (The Finest Girl You Ever Want to Meet)" b/w "By the Light of the Silvery Moon" (from Lonely Teardrops)	1957	62	5	10	1 (Note: Chart position from 1987.)	1	1 (Note: Chart position from 1986. Originally charted at number 6 in 1957.)	BPI: Gold	He's So Fine
"To Be Loved" b/w "Come Back to Me"	1958	22	7	64	19	—	23		He's So Fine
"As Long as I Live" b/w "I'm Wanderin'"	1958	70	11	—	—	—	—		He's So Fine
"We Have Love" b/w "Singing a Song"	1958	93	15	—	—	—	—		Lonely Teardrops
"Lonely Teardrops" b/w "In the Blue of Evening"	1958	7	1	53	—	—	—		Lonely Teardrops
"That's Why (I Love You So)" b/w "Love Is All"	1959	13	2	—	—	—	—		Lonely Teardrops
"I'll Be Satisfied" b/w "Ask"	1959	20	6	—	—	—	—		So Much
"You Better Know It" b/w "Never Go Away" (from So Much)	1959	37	1	—	—	—	—		Lonely Teardrops
"Talk That Talk" b/w "Only You, Only Me"	1959	34	3	—	—	—	—		So Much
"—" denotes releases that did not chart.

=== 1960s ===
Titles (A-side, B-side)	Year	Peak chart positions						Certifications	Album
Titles (A-side, B-side)	Year	US	US R&B	AUS	BEL (FL)	NL	UK	Certifications	Album
"Night"	1960	4	3	19	17	—	—		A Woman, a Lover, a Friend
"Doggin' Around"	1960	15	1	76	—	—	—		Jackie Sings the Blues
"(You Were Made For) All My Love"	1960	12	—	30	—	—	33		A Woman, a Lover, a Friend
"A Woman, a Lover, a Friend"	1960	15	1	30	—	—	—		A Woman, a Lover, a Friend
"Alone at Last"	1960	8	20	11	—	—	50		Jackie Wilson Sings the World's Greatest Melodies
"Am I the Man"	1960	32	10	—	—	—	—		A Woman, a Lover, a Friend
"My Empty Arms"	1960	9	25	—	—	—	—		Jackie Wilson Sings the World's Greatest Melodies
"The Tear of the Year"	1960	44	10	—	—	—	—		Body and Soul
"Please Tell Me Why"	1961	20	11	—	—	—	—		Jackie Sings the Blues
"Your One and Only Love"	1961	40	—	—	—	—	—		A Woman, a Lover, a Friend
"I'm Comin' on Back to You"	1961	19	9	—	—	—	—		By Special Request
"Lonely Life"	1961	80	—	—	—	—	—		By Special Request
"Years from Now"	1961	37	25	—	—	—	—		Non-album tracks
"You Don't Know What It Means"	1961	79	19	—	—	—	—		Non-album tracks
"My Heart Belongs to Only You"	1961	65	—	—	—	—	—		By Special Request
"The Way I Am"	1961	58	—	—	—	—	—		By Special Request
"The Greatest Hurt"	1961	34	—	—	—	—	—		Body and Soul
"There'll Be No Next Time"	1961	75	—	—	—	—	—		Body and Soul
"I Found Love" (with Linda Hopkins) b/w "There's Nothing Like Love"	1962	93	—	—	—	—	—		Non-album tracks
"Hearts" b/w "Sing (And Tell the Blues So Long)" (Non-album track)	1962	58	—	—	—	—	—		Jackie Wilson Sings the World's Greatest Melodies
"I Just Can't Help It" b/w "My Tale of Woe" (Non-album track)	1962	70	17	—	—	—	—		Somethin' Else!!
"Forever and a Day" b/w "Baby, That's All" (Non-album track)	1962	82	—	—	—	—	—		Jackie Wilson Sings the World's Greatest Melodies
"What Good Am I Without You" b/w "A Girl Named Tamiko"	1962	121	—	—	—	—	—		Baby Workout
"Baby Workout" b/w "I'm Going Crazy (Gotta Get You Off My Mind)" (Non-album track)	1963	5	1	66	—	—	93		Baby Workout
"Shake a Hand" (with Linda Hopkins) b/w "Say I Do" (Non-album track)	1963	42	21	—	—	—	—		Shake a Hand
"Shake! Shake! Shake!" b/w "He's a Fool" (Non-album track)	1963	33	21	—	—	—	—		Baby Workout
"Baby Get It (And Don't Quit It)" b/w "The New Breed"	1963	61	—	—	—	—	—		Non-album track
"I'm Travelin' On" b/w "Haunted House"	1964	123	—	—	—	—	—		Non-album tracks
"Call Her Up" b/w "The Kickapoo" (from Baby Workout)	1964	110	48	—	—	—	—		Non-album tracks
"Big Boss Line" b/w "Be My Girl"	1964	94	34	—	—	—	—		Somethin' Else!!
"Squeeze Her - Tease Her (But Love Her)" b/w "Give Me Back My Heart"	1964	89	—	—	—	—	—		Somethin' Else!!
"Give Me Back My Heart"	1964	—	64	—	—	—	—		
"She's All Right" b/w "Watch Out" (Non-album track)	1964	102	39	—	—	—	—		Soul Time
"Danny Boy" b/w "Soul Time"	1965	94	25	—	—	—	—		Soul Time
"No Pity (In the Naked City)" b/w "I'm So Lonely" (Non-album track)	1965	59	25	—	—	—	—		Soul Time
"I Believe I'll Love On" b/w "Lonely Teardrops" (from Spotlight on Jackie Wilson)	1965	96	34	—	—	—	—		Non-album tracks
"Think Twice" (with LaVern Baker) b/w "Please Don't Hurt Me"	1965	93	37	—	—	—	—		Non-album tracks
"Whispers (Gettin' Louder)" b/w "The Fairest of Them All"	1966	11	5	—	—	—	—		Whispers
"I Don't Want to Lose You"	1967	84	11	—	—	—	—		Whispers
"Just Be Sincere"	1967	91	43	—	—	—	—		Whispers
"I've Lost You" b/w "Those Heartaches"	1967	82	35	—	—	—	—		Higher and Higher
"(Your Love Keeps Lifting Me) Higher and Higher" b/w "I'm the One to Do It"	1967	6	1	24	—	57	11 (Note: Chart position from 1969.)	BPI: Gold	Higher and Higher
"Since You Showed Me How to Be Happy" b/w "The Who Who Song" (Non-album track)	1967	32	22	—	—	—	—		I Get the Sweetest Feeling
"For Your Precious Love" (with Count Basie) b/w "Uptight (Everything's Alright)"	1968	49	26	—	—	—	—		Manufacturers of Soul
"Chain Gang" (with Count Basie) b/w "Funky Broadway"	1968	84	37	—	—	—	—		Manufacturers of Soul
"I Get the Sweetest Feeling" b/w "Nothing But Blue Skies"	1968	34	12	—	19	21	3	BPI: Platinum	I Get the Sweetest Feeling
"For Once in My Life" b/w "You Brought About a Change in Me" (from I Get the Sweetest Feeling)	1968	70	—	—	—	—	—		It's All a Part of Love
"I Still Love You" b/w "Hum De Dum De Do"	1969	105	39	—	—	—	—		Non-album tracks
"Helpless" b/w "Do It the Right Way" (Non-album track)	1969	108	21	—	—	—	—		Do Your Thing
"—" denotes releases that did not chart.

=== 1970s ===
Titles (A-side, B-side)	Year	Peak chart positions						Album
Titles (A-side, B-side)	Year	US	US R&B	AUS	BEL (FL)	NL	UK	Album
"Let This Be a Letter (To My Baby)" b/w "Didn't I"	1970	91	34	—	—	—	—	This Love Is Real
"(I Can Feel Those Vibrations) This Love Is Real" b/w "Love Uprising"	1970	56	9	—	—	—	—	This Love Is Real
"Love Is Funny That Way" b/w "Try It Again"	1971	95	18	—	—	—	—	You Got Me Walking
"You Got Me Walking" b/w "The Fountain"	1971	93	22	—	—	—	—	You Got Me Walking
"The Girl Turned Me On" "Forever and a Day"	1972	—	44	—	—	—	—	You Got Me Walking
"Because of You" b/w "Go Away"	1973	—	45	—	—	—	—	Beautiful Day
"Sing a Little Song" b/w "No More Goodbyes"	1973	—	95	—	—	—	—	Non-album tracks
"Don't Burn No Bridges" (with The Chi-Lites) b/w "Don't Burn No Bridges" (Instrumental)	1975	—	91	—	—	—	—	Nobody But You
"Nobody But You" b/w "I've Learned About Life"	1976	—	—	—	—	—	—	Nobody But You
"It Only Happens When I Look At You" b/w "Just As Soon As The Feeling's Over"	1976	—	—	—	—	—	—	Nobody But You
"—" denotes releases that did not chart.

* - Through a period between November 1963 and January 1965, Billboard didn't publish an R&B chart. Ratings from Cash Box Top 50 in R&B Locations chart.

=== Billboard Year-End performances ===
Year	Song	Year-End Position
1959	"Lonely Teardrops"	56
1959	"That's Why (I Love You So)"	90
1960	"Night"	34
1960	"Doggin' Around"	95
1963	"Baby Workout"	60
1967	"(Your Love Keeps Lifting Me) Higher and Higher"	53
