= Mr. Excitement! =

Compilation album by Jackie Wilson
- Released: November 10, 1992
- Recorded: 1956–1975
- Genre: R&B
- Label: Rhino Records

Professional ratings
Review scores
Source	Rating
AllMusic	4.5/5 stars
Rolling Stone	4/5 stars

Mr. Excitement! is a 1992 Rhino Records three disc compilation album of the music of R&B singer Jackie Wilson, covering his entire career from 1956 through the early 1970s, including his early work with Billy Ward and His Dominoes. Wilson was one of the most successful R&B artists ever, entering the charts over 50 times. The album contains 72 tracks and, in 2003, it was ranked number 235 on the Rolling Stone's 500 Greatest Albums of All Time, and 236 in a 2012 revised list.

== Track listing ==
=== Disc one ===
1. "St. Louis Blues" (W. C. Handy)
2. "St. Therese of the Roses" (Remus Harris, Arthur Strauss)
3. "Reet Petite (The Finest Girl You Ever Want to Meet)" (Tyran Carlo, Berry Gordy Jr.)
4. "By the Light of the Silvery Moon" (Gus Edwards, Edward Madden)
5. "Danny Boy" (Frederick Edward Weatherly)
6. "Right Now!" (Dick Wolf, Randy Starr)
7. "I'm Wanderin'" (Tyran Carlo, Berry Gordy Jr.)
8. "We Have Love" (Berry Gordy Jr., Tyran Carlo)
9. "Singing a Song" (Jackie Wilson)
10. "To Be Loved" (Berry Gordy Jr., Tyran Carlo)
11. "Lonely Teardrops" (Gwen Fuqua, Berry Gordy Jr., Tyran Carlo)
12. "I'll Be Satisfied" (Tyran Carlo, Berry Gordy Jr.)
13. "You Better Know It" (Jackie Wilson)
14. "Talk That Talk" (Sidney Wyche)
15. "Only You, Only Me" (Benny Davis, Ted Murray)
16. "Hush-A-Bye" (Winfield Scott, Lionel Belasco)
17. "That's Why (I Love You So)" (Tyran Carlo, Berry Gordy Jr.)
18. "I Know I'll Always Be in Love with You" (Barbara Mayson Campbell)
19. "Wishing Well" (Jackie Wilson)
20. "So Much" (Jackie Wilson, Dorian Burton, Joseph Dias)
21. "It's All a Part of Love" (Steve Davis, Ted Murray)
22. "Night" (John Lehman / Herb Miller)
23. "Doggin' Around" (Lena Agree)
24. "She Done Me Wrong" (Lena Agree)

=== Disc two ===
1. "Sazzle Dazzle" (Paul Tarnopol)
2. "(You Were Made for) All My Love" (Jackie Wilson, Billy Myles)
3. "A Woman, a Lover, a Friend" (Sidney Wyche)
4. "Am I the Man" (Bob Hamilton, Tom King)
5. "Alone at Last" (John Lehman)
6. "My Empty Arms" (Al Kasha)
7. "The Tear of the Year" (Peter Udell, Gary Geld)
8. "Your One and Only Love" (Billy Myles)
9. "Please Tell Me Why" (Paul Tarnopol)
10. "I'm Comin' on Back to You" (Horace Ott, Al Kasha)
11. "Years from Now" (Horace Ott, Alonzo Tucker, R. Adams )
12. "You Don't Know What It Means" (Alonzo Tucker, Jackie Wilson, M. Levy)
13. "Stormy Weather" (Harold Arlen, Ted Koehler)
14. "Lonely Life" (Al Kasha, Truman Thomas)
15. "My Heart Belongs to Only You" (Frank Daniels, Dorothy Daniels)
16. "The Greatest Hurt" (Billy Myles)
17. "I Found Love" (Alonzo Tucker, Jackie Wilson)
18. "I Just Can't Help It" (Alonzo Tucker, Jackie Wilson)
19. "Baby Workout" (Jackie Wilson, Alonzo Tucker)
20. "Shake a Hand" (Joe Morris)
21. "Squeeze Her - Tease Her (But Love Her)" (Alonzo Tucker, Jackie Wilson)
22. "I've Got to Get Back (Country Boy)" (Alonzo Tucker, Paul Tarnopol)
23. "Silent One"
24. "She's All Right" (Eddie Singleton)

=== Disc three ===
1. "Shake! Shake! Shake!" (R. Adams)
2. "Danny Boy" (Frederick Edward Weatherly)
3. "No Pity (In the Naked City)" (Alonzo Tucker, Jackie Wilson)
4. "Think Twice" (Charlie Singleton)
5. "I Believe" (Jimmy Shirl, Irvin Graham, Al Stillman, Ervin Drake)
6. "Whispers (Gettin' Louder)" (David Scott, Barbara Acklin)
7. "I've Lost You" (Van McCoy)
8. "Who Am I?" (Bert Keyes, Bob Elgin)
9. "Just Be Sincere" (Bernard Reed, Robert Wright)
10. "I Don't Want to Lose You" (Karl Tarleton, Carl Davis)
11. "Stop Lying"
12. "(Your Love Keeps Lifting Me) Higher and Higher" (Raynard Miner, Gary Jackson, Carl Smith)
13. "Since You Showed Me How to Be Happy" (Carl Smith, Gary Jackson, Gerald Sims)
14. "Open the Door to Your Heart" (Darrell Banks)
15. "Chain Gang" (Sam Cooke)
16. "Even When You Cry" (Quincy Jones, Marilyn Bergman)
17. "I Get the Sweetest Feeling" (Van McCoy, Alicia Evelyn)
18. "For Once in My Life" (Orlando Murden, Ron Miller)
19. "(I Can Feel Those Vibrations) This Love Is Real" (Daniel Moore)
20. "This Love Is Mine" (J. Perry)
21. "You Got Me Walking" (Eugene Record)
22. "No More Goodbyes"
23. "Just Call My Name" (James Thompson)
24. "Don't Burn No Bridges" (Romaine Anderson)
