= Mon cœur s'ouvre à ta voix =

Aria by Camille Saint-Saëns

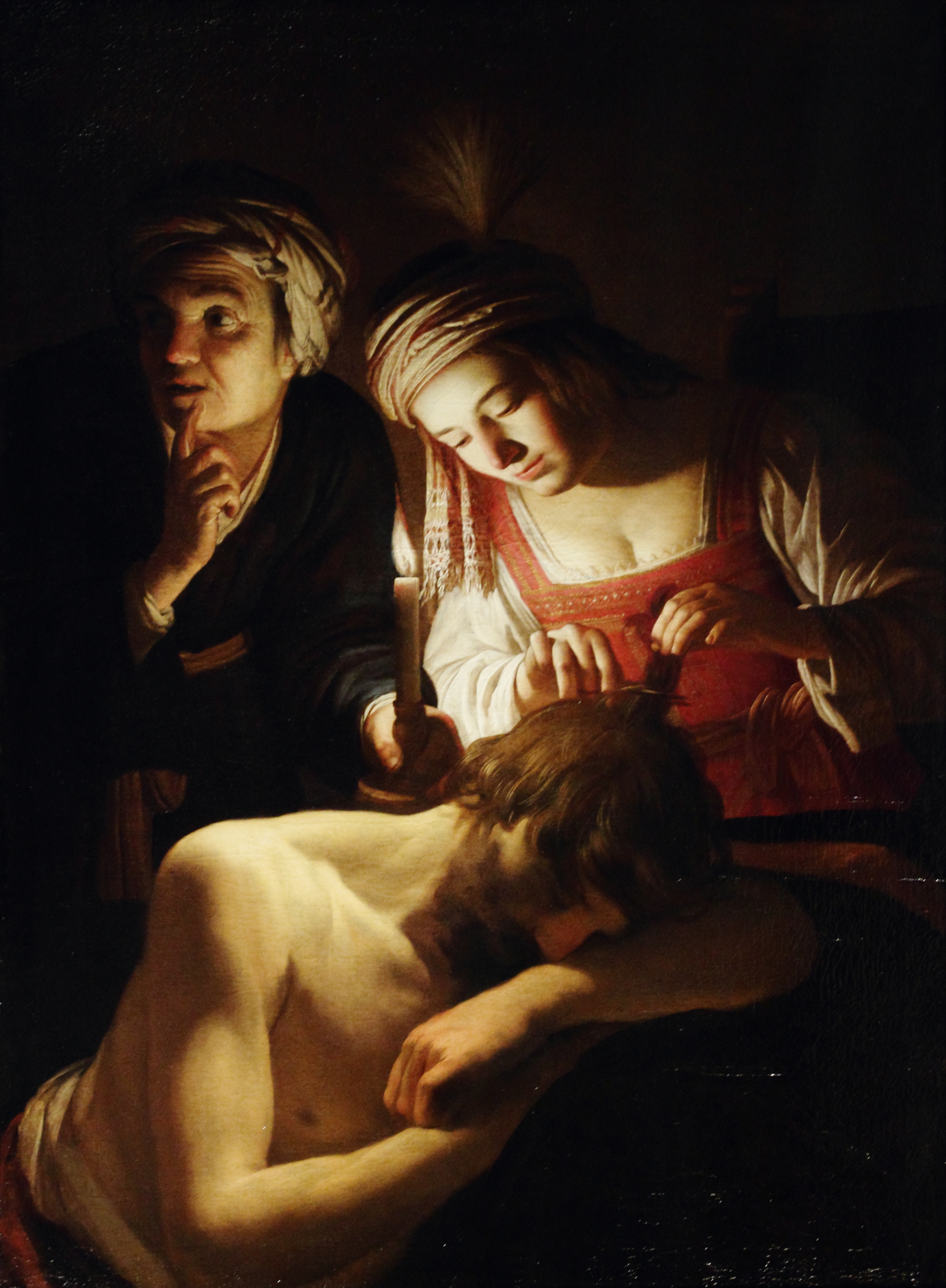
Samson and Delilah Gerard van Honthorst, 1615

"Mon cœur s'ouvre à ta voix" is a popular mezzo-soprano aria from Camille Saint-Saëns's opera Samson and Delilah, known in English as "Softly awakes my heart", or more literally "My heart opens itself to your voice". It is sung by Delilah in act 2 as she attempts to seduce Samson into revealing the secret of his strength.

== Music ==
In the opera, Delilah is responding to Samson's words "Dalila! Dalila! Je t'aime!" (Delilah! Delilah! I love you!) which he repeats between the first and second verses of her aria; these interjections are omitted in recital performances or sometimes sung to the changed words "Samson! Samson! Je t'aime!"; Samson's part in the final 22 bars of the stage aria where he joins Delilah in a duet is also omitted in a recital, although some performers, notably Marilyn Horne and Jessye Norman, have sung Samson's final words – changed as above, rising to a high B♭. A performance takes between 5 1/2 and 6 1/2 minutes.

The aria is notated in D♭ major with time signatures of 3/4 for the verse and common time (4/4) for the refrain ("Ah! réponds"); the tempo indication is andantino ( = 66) for the verses and un poco più lento (a little slower) for the refrain. The vocal range extends from B♭_{3} to G♭_{5}, with a tessitura from E♭_{4} to E♭_{5}.

The instrumentation calls for 2 flutes, 1 oboe, 1 English horn, 2 clarinets in A, 1 bass clarinet, 2 bassoons, 3 horns, 1 trumpet, 3 trombones, timpani, harp and strings. All instrument lines, except the harp, make intensive use of divisi (cellos play in four divisi). The orchestral accompaniment consists mainly of reiterated notes for the first verse and of falling chromatic lines for the second verse; the refrain is accompanied by ascending broken chords.

The melismatic setting of the lyrics present a particular challenge for the performance of this aria as it requires legato singing over a wide range.

== Lyrics ==
Original French

Mon cœur s'ouvre à ta voix,
comme s'ouvrent les fleurs
aux baisers de l'aurore!
Mais, ô mon bienaimé,
pour mieux sécher mes pleurs,
que ta voix parle encore!
Dis-moi qu'à Dalila
tu reviens pour jamais.
Redis à ma tendresse
les serments d'autrefois,
ces serments que j'aimais!
𝄆 Ah! réponds à ma tendresse!
Verse-moi, verse-moi l'ivresse! 𝄇
Dalila! Dalila! Je t'aime!

Ainsi qu'on voit des blés
les épis onduler
sous la brise légère,
ainsi frémit mon cœur,
prêt à se consoler,
à ta voix qui m'est chère!
La flèche est moins rapide
à porter le trépas,
que ne l'est ton amante
à voler dans tes bras!
𝄆 Ah! réponds à ma tendresse!
Verse-moi, verse-moi l'ivresse! 𝄇
Dalila! Dalila! Je t'aime!

English translation

My heart opens to your voice
Like the flowers open
To the kisses of the dawn!
But, oh my beloved,
To better dry my tears,
Let your voice speak again!
Tell me that you are returning
To Delilah forever!
Repeat to my tenderness
The promises of old times,
Those promises that I loved!
𝄆 Ah! respond to my tenderness!
Fill me with ecstasy! 𝄇
Delilah! Delilah! I love you!

Like one sees the blades
Of wheat that wave
In the light wind,
So trembles my heart,
Ready to be consoled,
By your voice that is so dear to me!
The arrow is less rapid
In bringing death,
Than your love is
By flying into your arms!
𝄆 Ah! respond to my tenderness!
Fill me with ecstasy! 𝄇
Delilah! Delilah! I love you!

Poetic English

My heart at thy dear voice
Wakes with joy, like the flow'r
At the sun's bright returning!
But O, my dearest one,
That grief may lose its pow'r,
Say 'tis mine, thy heart's yearning!
Oh, bide here at my side!
Promise ne'er thou'lt depart!
Once more those vows so loving
Let me hear from thy heart!
Breathe that mine still thou art!
𝄆 Ah! respond to Love's caresses,
Join in all my soul expresses! 𝄇
Delilah! Delilah! I love thee!

As winds o'er golden grain
Softly sigh roving by,
Till 'tis swaying like the ocean,
So sways my burning heart
With rapture when thou'rt nigh!
And thy voice speaks thy devotion!
The dart is not so swift,
Bearing fear in its flight,
As I speed to be held
In thine arms of delight!
𝄆 Ah! respond to Love's caresses,
Join in all my soul expresses! 𝄇
Delilah! Delilah! I love thee!

== In modern music ==
The aria's melody appears in the song "Night", written by John Lehmann and Ron Miller and performed in 1960 by Jackie Wilson.

Julie Andrews and Italian-American tenor Sergio Franchi sang this aria in duet on the 17 February 1973 ABC TV broadcast of The Julie Andrews Hour.

A version of the song appeared on the debut album of Klaus Nomi in 1981.

Run–D.M.C.'s Joseph Simmons' rendition of this song appears on the 1997 album The Rapsody Overture: Hip Hop Meets Classic, a collection of hip hop songs intertwined with classical vocals and music.

A montage of the last two lines of this aria has been recorded by English alternative rock band Muse, and is included in the track titled "I Belong to You (+Mon cœur s'ouvre à ta voix)" of their 2009 album The Resistance.
