= Howard Huntsberry =

American actor

- Born: March 5, 1952 (age 73); Pacoima, California
- Occupation(s): Singer, drummer, actor

Howard Stafford Huntsberry (born March 5, 1952) is an American R&B singer, drummer/percussionist, and actor from Pacoima, California.

== Biography ==
In the mid-1970s, he served as drummer and male co-lead vocalist of the one-off project, The Ultimate Music Experience (T.U.M.E.), who released a self-titled album in 1975. In 1981, he became the frontman for the group Klique, a position he held through 1985, when the group released its final album.

In 1988, he released a solo album, With Love, which produced two minor hits on the Billboard R&B chart. He also starred as singer Jackie Wilson in the movie La Bamba, singing a cover of "Lonely Teardrops" which was on the soundtrack album of the same. Incidentally, Klique's biggest hit had also been a cover of a Jackie Wilson song, "Stop Doggin' Me Around".

Paying further tribute to Jackie Wilson, he also performed Wilson's "(Your Love Keeps Lifting Me) Higher and Higher" in Ghostbusters II.

== Discography ==
=== Studio albums ===
- With Love (MCA Records, 1988)

=== Singles ===
Year	Single	US R&B
1987	"Lonely Teardrops"	—
1988	"Sleepless Weekend"	11
1989	"Married Men Get Lonely Too"	66
1989	"(Your Love Keeps Lifting Me) Higher and Higher"	—
1989	"Don't Take This Out on Me"	—
"—" denotes releases that did not chart or were not released.
