= Klique =

American R&B trio

- Origin: Los Angeles, United States
- Genres: R&B, soul
- Years active: 1981–1986
- Labels: MCA
- Past members: Howard Huntsberry; Isaac Suthers; Deborah Hunter

Klique was an American R&B trio, consisting of Howard Huntsberry, Isaac Suthers and his sister, Deborah Hunter. They released four albums, starting with It's Winning Time in 1981, concluding with Love Cycles in 1985. Their only song to make the US Billboard Hot 100 chart was a cover version of Jackie Wilson's 1960 hit, "Stop Doggin' Me Around," which reached #50 on the Hot 100 and #2 on the US Billboard R&B chart in 1983. In total, they had nine songs on Billboard's R&B chart.

== Discography ==
=== Studio albums ===
Year	Album	Label	Peak chart positions	
Year	Album	Label	US 200	US R&B
1981	It's Winning Time	MCA	—	40
1982	Let's Wear It Out	MCA	—	—
1983	Try It Out	MCA	70	11
1985	Love Cycles	MCA	—	25
"—" denotes releases that did not chart.

=== Singles ===
Year	Single	Peak chart positions	
Year	Single	US R&B	US Pop
1981	"Love's Dance"	24	—
1981	"Middle of a Slow Dance"	45	―
1982	"Dance Like Crazy"	39	―
1982	"Pump Your Rump"	83	―
1982	"I Can't Shake This Feeling"	47	—
1983	"Flashback / Honey (I Want to Be Your Lover)"	59	—
1983	"Stop Doggin' Me Around"	2	50
1985	"Be Ready for Love"	56	―
1985	"A Woman, a Lover, a Friend"	15	―
1986	"Waiting for Ya Genie"	―	―
"—" denotes releases that did not chart or were not released in that territory.
