= A Woman, a Lover, a Friend =

Single by Jackie Wilson

from the album A Woman, a Lover, a Friend
- B-side: "(You Were Made for) All My Love"
- Released: June 1960
- Genre: Soul
- Length: 2:37
- Label: Brunswick
- Songwriter: Sid Wyche

Jackie Wilson singles chronology
"Night"/"Doggin' Around" (1960)	"A Woman, a Lover, a Friend" (1960)	"Alone at Last" (1960)

"A Woman, a Lover, a Friend" is the 1960 follow up single to "Doggin' Around" performed by Jackie Wilson from his album of the same name. Just as its predecessor, the single made it to number one on the R&B charts, where it stayed at the top spot for one month. "A Woman, a Lover, a Friend", also charted on the Billboard Hot 100 peaking at number fifteen.

== Other versions ==
- The song was first time released by Buddy Johnson & His Orchestra in September 1959 as the B-side of the single "Keeping My Love for You".
- An instrumental version appeared on the Booker T. & the M.G.'s album Green Onions in 1962.
- Otis Redding covered this song in 1964 and it appeared on his 1965 album The Great Otis Redding Sings Soul Ballads.
- It was also covered by Darius de Haas singing as the fictional character, Shy Baldwin on Season 3 of the TV series The Marvelous Mrs. Maisel in 2019.
