= Doggin' Around =

Single by Jackie Wilson

from the album Jackie Sings the Blues
- A-side: "Night"
- Released: March 1960
- Genre: R&B, Pop
- Length: 2:45
- Label: Brunswick
- Songwriter: Lena Agree

Jackie Wilson singles chronology
"Night" (1960)	"Doggin' Around" (1960)	"Alone at Last" (1960)

"Doggin' Around" is a 1960 Rhythm and blues song written by Lena Agree and originally performed by Jackie Wilson. Reaching both the R&B and the pop singles charts in the U.S., "Doggin' Around" hit number one on the Hot R&B Sides chart for three weeks and peaked at number fifteen on the Billboard Hot 100. The A-side of the single was "Night", based on the aria "My Heart at Thy Sweet Voice" from the opera Samson and Delilah, by Saint-Saëns; it made the top five on the R&B and pop charts.

== Klique version ==
- In 1983, vocal trio Klique had their biggest hit with their cover version, entitled "Stop Doggin' Me Around". Their record rose to number two on the soul singles chart and number fifty on the Hot 100.

== Other versions ==
- Michael Jackson also covered this song for his 1973 album, Music & Me. A snippet of this version was featured in the 2026 biopic, Michael.
