= Talk That Talk (Jackie Wilson song) =

Single by Jackie Wilson

from the album So Much
- B-side: "Only You, Only Me"
- Released: December 1959
- Genre: R&B
- Length: 2:14
- Label: Brunswick
- Songwriter(s): Sid Wyche

Jackie Wilson singles chronology
"You Better Know It" (1959)	"Talk That Talk" (1959)	"(You Were Made For) All My Love" (1960)

Talk That Talk is a 1959 hit song written for Jackie Wilson by Sid Wyche. It was released, with Only You, Only Me as the B-side, on Brunswick Records in the US and in the UK on Coral Records. It was on the release of "Talk That Talk" that Wilson met his second wife Lynn. "Talk That Talk" reached #3 in R&B and #34 in pop charts. Wilson recorded the song with chorus and orchestra under Decca Records' veteran arranger Dick Jacobs. Jacobs was criticised for the "cleaned up" sound of using white backing singers, but defended the decision as driven by the limited number of formally trained backing singers available at the time.

The lyrics begin "Shooby do do wop do Shooby do do wop do" and continue "You ought to see my baby, Walkin down the avenue, Arm and arm with me..."
