= Sid Wyche =

American songwriter and pianist (1922–1983)

- Born: Sidney Jackson Wyche; February 11, 1922; Hampton, Virginia, US
- Died: November 11, 1983 (aged 61) New York, New York, US
- Occupation: Songwriter

Sidney Jackson Wyche (February 11, 1922 – November 11, 1983) was an American songwriter and pianist. Wyche is best known for writing the jazz standard "Alright, Okay, You Win", Elvis Presley's Billboard Hot 100 chart-topper "A Big Hunk o' Love", and the Jackie Wilson hits "A Woman, a Lover, a Friend" and "Talk That Talk".
