= Lonely Teardrops =

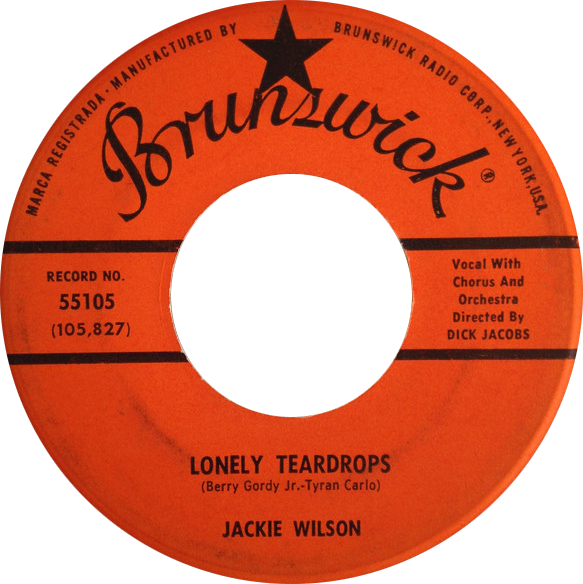
- One of side-A labels of the US single

Single by Jackie Wilson

from the album Lonely Teardrops
- B-side: "In the Blue of the Evening"
- Released: November 17, 1958
- Recorded: 1958
- Genre: Rhythm and blues; pop
- Length: 2:46
- Label: Brunswick
- Songwriters: Berry Gordy; Roquel "Billy" Davis; Gwendolyn Gordy
- Producer: Berry Gordy

Jackie Wilson singles chronology
"To Be Loved" (1957)	"Lonely Teardrops" (1958)	"That's Why (I Love You So)" (1959)

"Lonely Teardrops" is a song written by Berry Gordy Jr., Gwen Gordy and Roquel "Billy" Davis, first recorded and released as a single in 1958 by R&B singer Jackie Wilson, on the Brunswick label. The single was commercially successful, reaching the top ten on the Billboard Hot 100, and number-one on the R&B chart. It is ranked as the 57th biggest U.S. hit of 1959.

The Rock and Roll Hall of Fame named it one of "Songs that Shaped Rock and Roll". In 1999, it was inducted into the Grammy Hall of Fame. "Lonely Teardrops" was also ranked #315 on Rolling Stone magazine's list of The 500 Greatest Songs of All Time (2011).

== Song information ==
Written by Berry Gordy Jr., Gwendolyn Gordy (Berry's sister) and Roquel "Billy" Davis, going under the pseudonym Tyran Carlo, the single, alongside Wilson's debuting five consecutive singles between 1957–58, turned Wilson into an R&B superstar and influenced the later careers of Davis, who joined the staff of Chess Records while Gordy used the money from the song's success to form Motown Records within a year. The song raced up to number one on the Billboard R&B chart and became Wilson's first top ten hit on the Billboard Hot 100, eventually peaking at number seven. According to Wilson, it was originally intended by Gordy to be recorded as a ballad. After recording it, Wilson and Brunswick executives felt the song lacked something. It was then given to veteran Decca Records arranger Dick Jacobs who re-arranged it into the smash hit it became. While Dick Jacobs is credited on the label as the director of the orchestra neither the orchestra nor the accompanying chorus is identified. It is, however, widely accepted that the signature guitar lick was performed by George Barnes who was then a Decca artist and a first-call session musician, and the vocal accompaniment was supplied by "The Ray Conniff Orchestra and Chorus," who at the time were also popular in their own right, and who also supplied uncredited musical accompaniment to other popular singers and groups of the era. The hit's success helped land Wilson on American Bandstand and The Ed Sullivan Show performing to receptive audiences on the respective shows, as well as other shows such as Shindig and Hullabaloo.

This was the last song Jackie Wilson performed. He collapsed on-stage from a heart attack, while he was in the middle of the phrase, "My Heart is Crying", while appearing as one of the feature acts in Dick Clark's 'Good Ol' Rock and Roll Revue' in 1975.

== "Shout" ==
In performances around 1958, The Isley Brothers often ended their shows with "Lonely Teardrops", and began to extend the song with an improvised call-and-response around the words "You know you make me wanna... Shout!". They would eventually record this ending as the separate song "Shout", which was their first chart hit and gold single, and has been widely covered including a UK top 10 version by Lulu.

== Cover versions ==
- The title was covered by the rhythm and blues singer Chuck Jackson in his solo 1961 album I Don't Want to Cry!.
- Jay and the Americans covered the song on their 1970 album, Wax Museum.
- Brian Hyland also recorded a version of the song that reached #54 on the Billboard Hot 100 in 1971.
- In 1975 John Fogerty released a version of it on his solo album John Fogerty.
- The biggest hit cover version was recorded by country music singer Narvel Felts. His version was released in 1976 and reached #5 on the Billboard Hot Country Singles chart that June. He also reached #62 on the Billboard Hot 100.
- Victor Wood covered this song on his 1971 album Mr. Lonely.
- Michael Jackson covered the song in 1972, presumably for his third studio album Music & Me (1973), but his version would not see the light of day until Looking Back to Yesterday in 1986.

Covers of the song have also appeared in several films: A version with Michael McDonald singing lead was included on the 1991 album The New York Rock and Soul Revue: Live at the Beacon, and was later used in the film Leaving Las Vegas. It was also covered by Howard Huntsberry, who portrayed Wilson, for the 1987 biographical movie about Ritchie Valens, La Bamba, and Huey Lewis's performance of the song in the 2000 karaoke-themed film Duets was also released as part of the film's soundtrack.

== Charts ==
Chart (1958–1959)	Date	Position
US Billboard Hot 100	February 9–16, 1959	7
US Billboard R&B	March 1959	1

== See also ==
- List of number-one R&B singles of 1958 (U.S.)
