= Night (Jackie Wilson song) =

Single by Jackie Wilson

from the album A Woman, a Lover, a Friend
- B-side: "Doggin' Around"
- Released: March 1960
- Genre: Easy listening
- Length: 2:45
- Label: Brunswick
- Songwriters: Camille Saint-Saëns, Johnny Lehmann

Jackie Wilson singles chronology
| "A Woman, a Lover, a Friend" (1960) | "Night" (1960) | "Doggin' Around" (1960) |

"Night" is a popular song recorded by Jackie Wilson in 1960. The single was Wilson's biggest hit, peaking at #4 on the Billboard Hot 100.

== Background ==
The song is based on the aria "Mon cœur s'ouvre à ta voix" from the opera Samson and Delilah by Camille Saint-Saëns, with lyrics by Johnny Lehmann. This was a successful effort for Jackie Wilson to sing in an operatic voice. This version ended on a wild orchestral descending scale in the strings.

== Chart performance ==
| Chart (1960) | Peak position |
|---|---|
| US Billboard Hot 100 | 4 |
| US Hot R&B Sides (Billboard) | 3 |
