= That's Why (I Love You So) =

Single by Jackie Wilson

from the album Lonely Teardrops
- B-side: "Love is All"
- Released: March 1959
- Genre: Soul
- Length: 2:05
- Label: Brunswick
- Songwriter(s): Berry Gordy Jr., Tyran Carlo

Jackie Wilson singles chronology
"Lonely Teardrops" (1958)	"That's Why (I Love You So)" (1959)	"I'll Be Satisfied" (1959)

"That's Why (I Love You So)" is a song written by Berry Gordy Jr. and Tyran Carlo and performed by Jackie Wilson. It reached #2 on the U.S. R&B chart and #13 on the U.S. pop chart in 1959. It was featured on his 1959 album Lonely Teardrops.

The song was arranged by Dick Jacobs.

The song ranked #90 on Billboard's Year-End Hot 100 singles of 1959.

== Other versions ==
- Cliff Bennett and the Rebel Rousers released a version of the song on their 1966 album Drivin' You Wild.
- Steve Goodman released a version of the song on his 1979 album High and Outside.
- The Temptations released a version of the song on their 1995 album For Lovers Only.
- Syl Johnson released a version of the song on his 2015 album Complete Twinight Records 45s.
- John Eddie and The Front Street Runners released a version of the song on their 2017 album Live at the London Victory Club '81.
