= Alone at Last (song) =

Single by Jackie Wilson

from the album Sings the World's Greatest Melodies
- B-side: "Am I the Man"
- Released: September 1960
- Genre: Soul
- Length: 2:59
- Label: Brunswick
- Songwriter: Johnny Lehmann

Jackie Wilson singles chronology
"A Woman, a Lover, a Friend" (1960)	"Alone at Last" (1960)	"My Empty Arms" (1960)

"Alone at Last" is a song written by Johnny Lehmann and performed by Jackie Wilson featuring Dick Jacobs and His Orchestra. It was featured on his 1963 album Sings the World's Greatest Melodies.

== Background ==
The song's melody was adapted from Pyotr Ilyich Tchaikovsky's, Concerto No. 1 in B Flat Minor

== Chart performance ==
"Alone at Last" reached No. 8 on the U.S. pop chart, No. 11 in Australia, No. 20 on the U.S. R&B chart, and No. 50 on the UK Singles Chart in 1960.
