= I Get the Sweetest Feeling =

Single by Jackie Wilson

from the album I Get the Sweetest Feeling
- B-side: "Nothing But Blue Skies"
- Released: June 1968
- Recorded: February 1968
- Genre: Pop, soul
- Length: 2:54
- Label: Brunswick
- Songwriters: Van McCoy, Alicia Evelyn
- Producer: Carl Davis

Jackie Wilson singles chronology
"Chain Gang" (1968)	"I Get the Sweetest Feeling" (1968)	"For Once in My Life" (1968)

"I Get the Sweetest Feeling" is a 1968 single by Jackie Wilson from the album with the same title.

== Song information ==
The track is a Motown inspired song recorded during his Chicago period when he regained energy and started to record many singles and albums again. The track was written by Van McCoy and Alicia Evelyn. The orchestra was directed by Willie Henderson with Motown's in-house band Funk Brothers performing the instrumental track with The Andantes providing the background vocals.

== Chart performance ==
In the US, the single was originally a moderate chart success securing a No.34 position on the Billboard charts and No. 12 on the Best Selling Rhythm and Blues Singles chart. Four years later, the single was released in the United Kingdom and managed to become a top 10 hit, reaching number nine. After the success of the re-release of "Reet Petite" in 1987, it was decided to posthumously re-release this track as well. The re-release hit the British top 10 again, peaking at number three in the UK Singles chart and No.20 in the Dutch Top 40.

== Track listings ==
Side	Title	Length
Original release (1968)
A	"I Get the Sweetest Feeling"	2:54
B	"Nothing But Blue Skies"	2.11
UK release (1972)
A	"I Get the Sweetest Feeling"	2:54
B	"(Your Love Keeps Lifting Me) Higher And Higher"	2:57
1987 re-release
A	"I Get the Sweetest Feeling"	2:54
B	"Lonely Teardrops"	2:39

== Charts ==
=== Weekly charts ===
Chart (1987)	Peak position
Italy Airplay (Music & Media)	18

== Certifications ==
Region	Certification	Certified units/sales
New Zealand (RMNZ)	Platinum	30,000^{‡}
United Kingdom (BPI)	Platinum	600,000^{‡}
^{‡} Sales+streaming figures based on certification alone.

== Cover versions ==
- A cover version was recorded by Aretha Franklin's sister Erma Franklin in 1970 as the B-side to a pair of Jackie Wilson songs (A-side: Whispers (Gettin' Louder)) and was part of a 1986 NME Northern soul compilation cassette, Feet Start Dancing.
- A cover version was recorded by Will Young in 2002 as the B-side to his single "The Long and Winding Road".
- A cover version was recorded by Jamie Cullum in 2004 as the second track to his single "Everlasting Love".
- The track was covered on February 13, 2006 by Liz McClarnon as her debut solo single which was a double A-side with "Woman in Love". The single reached No. 5 on the UK Singles Chart.
- Jackie Wilson's son Bobby Brooks Wilson recorded the song for his 2016 EP I Can't Love You Anymore and has frequently played it live.

== In popular culture ==
- The song was used in a number of films including High Fidelity and the television series Jam.
- A cover of the song featured in adverts for Yes Car Credit.

== See also ==
- Suspicious Minds
