= (Your Love Keeps Lifting Me) Higher and Higher =

1967 single by Jackie Wilson

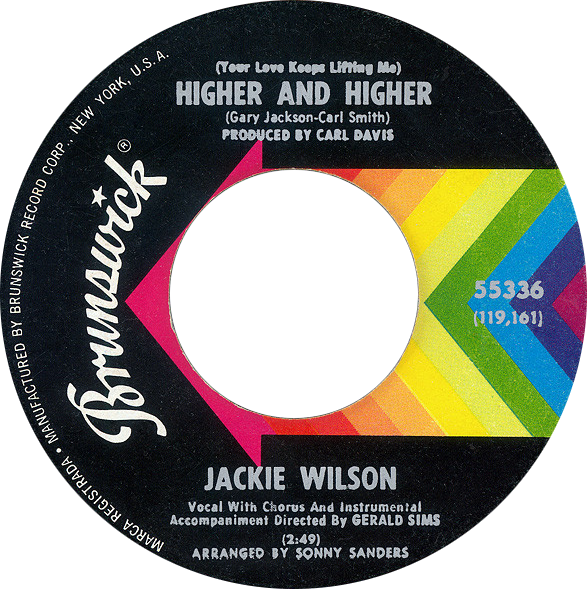
- Side A of the US single

Single by Jackie Wilson

from the album Higher and Higher
- B-side: "I'm the One to Do It"
- Released: August 1967
- Recorded: July 6, 1967
- Studio: Columbia, Chicago
- Genre: Chicago soul; pop soul
- Label: Brunswick; 55336
- Songwriters: Gary Jackson; Raynard Miner; Carl Smith
- Producer: Carl Davis

Jackie Wilson singles chronology
"I've Lost You" (1967)	"(Your Love Keeps Lifting Me) Higher and Higher" (1967)	"Since You Showed Me How to Be Happy" (1967)

"(Your Love Keeps Lifting Me) Higher and Higher" is an R&B song written by Gary Jackson, Raynard Miner, and Carl Smith. It was recorded by Jackie Wilson for his album Higher and Higher (1967), produced by Carl Davis, and became a Top 10 pop and number one R&B hit.

== Overview ==
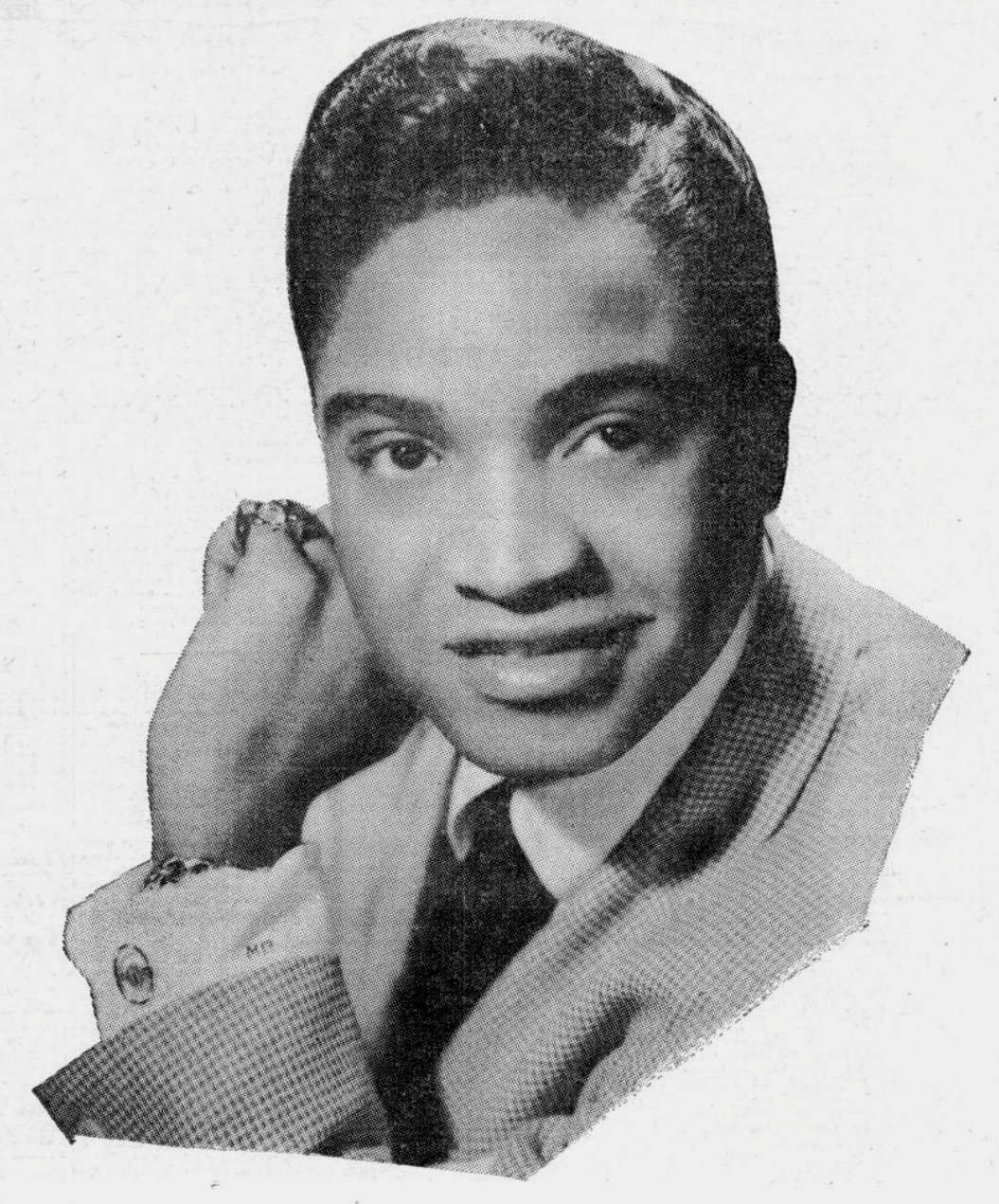
Jackie Wilson in 1961

The backing track was recorded on July 6, 1967 at Columbia's studios in Chicago. Produced by Carl Davis, the session, arranged by Sonny Sanders, featured bassist James Jamerson, drummer Richard "Pistol" Allen, guitarist Robert White, and keyboardist Johnny Griffith; these four musicians were all members of the Motown Records house band The Funk Brothers who often moonlighted on sessions for Davis to augment the wages paid by Motown.

According to Carl Davis, the Funk Brothers "used to come over on the weekends from Detroit. They'd load up in the van and come over to Chicago, and I would pay 'em double scale, and I'd pay 'em in cash." Similarly, two members of Motown's house session singers The Andantes, Jackie Hicks and Marlene Barrow, along with Pat Lewis (who was filling in for Andantes member Louvain Demps), performed on the session for "Higher and Higher". Drummer Maurice White (better known as a singer for Earth, Wind & Fire) also played on the recording. Motown's Mike Terry played the baritone saxophone.

The song was originally written by Chess Records' in-house writers and producers Carl Smith and Raynard Miner, and initially recorded by The Dells for the label, but not released. Another writer, Gary Jackson, made some changes to the song and pitched it to Davis at Brunswick. When the singer recorded his vocal track, Davis recalls, Jackie Wilson originally sang the song "like a soul ballad. I said that's totally wrong. You have to jump and go with the percussion... If he didn't want to sing it that way, I would put my voice on the record and sell millions." After hearing Davis' advice, Wilson cut the lead vocal for "Higher and Higher" in a single take.

A publishing deal for the song was reached with Brunswick after Chess producer/A&R head, Billy Davis, intervened. Writing credits were agreed, with Smith, Miner, Jackson and Billy Davis all named. Later, Davis removed his credit, and BMI now lists the song as by the three other writers. The Dells' version appeared on their album, There Is, for Chess subsidiary Cadet the same year.

== Release ==
Released in August 1967, the song reached number one on the US Billboard R&B chart and, in November, peaked on the Billboard Hot 100 at No. 6. Wilson's version also rose to number 11 and 15 upon the UK Singles Chart during 1969 and 1987 respectively.

Brunswick Records then released an album titled Higher and Higher in November 1967. Its chart peak was No. 163 (Billboard 200) and No. 28 (Billboard R&B Albums chart.)

The track was ranked No. 246 on Rolling Stone's list of The 500 Greatest Songs of All Time, and was inducted into the Grammy Hall of Fame in 1999.

=== Charts ===
==== Weekly charts ====
Chart (1967)	Peak position
Australia (Go-Set)	24
Canada Adult Contemporary (RPM)	2
Ireland (IRMA)	12
US Billboard Hot 100	6
US R&B (Billboard)	1
US Cash Box Top 100	6

Chart (1969)	Peak position
UK Singles Chart	11

Chart (1987)	Peak position
UK Singles Chart	15

==== Year-end charts ====
Chart (1967)	Rank
US Billboard Hot 100	53
US R&B (Billboard)	10
US Cash Box Top 100	67

== Certifications ==
Region	Certification	Certified units/sales
United Kingdom (BPI)	Gold	400,000^{‡}
^{‡} Sales+streaming figures based on certification alone.

== In popular culture ==
=== Film and television ===
Wilson's original version and a cover version by singer Howard Huntsberry were both used in the 1989 comedy film Ghostbusters II, with Huntsberry's version also appearing on the soundtrack. Wilson's original version was also used in the end credits of the films For Love or Money, The Bachelor, The Kid, Death to Smoochy, and Date Night, as well as the third season of the Netflix series Stranger Things (specifically the episode "Chapter Eight: The Battle of Starcourt").

=== Politics ===
An instrumental version of the song was played for then-Vice President Joe Biden at both the 2012 and 2016 Democratic National Conventions during his address to the delegates. The song was later played after Biden's first speech as President-elect during the 2020 United States Presidential Election and again for his closing address on the opening night of the 2024 Democratic National Convention.

== Rita Coolidge version ==
"(Your Love Has Lifted Me) Higher and Higher"
- US, German and Dutch picture sleeve

Single by Rita Coolidge

from the album Anytime...Anywhere
- B-side: originally "I Don't Want to Talk About It" replaced on later pressings with "Who's to Bless and Who's to Blame"
- Released: March 1977
- Genre: Disco
- Length: 4:02; 3:28 (single edit)
- Label: A&M
- Songwriters: Billy Davis, Gary Jackson, Raynard Miner and Carl Smith
- Producer: David Anderle

Rita Coolidge singles chronology
"Mean to Me" (1975)	"(Your Love Has Lifted Me) Higher and Higher" (1977)	"We're All Alone" (1977)

Rita Coolidge remade the song as "(Your Love Has Lifted Me) Higher and Higher" for her album Anytime...Anywhere (1977). Her version has a more moderate tempo than that of the uptempo original, and largely omits the chorus which is evidenced only in the background vocals sung under the repetition of the first verse with which she closes the song. Coolidge and her sister Priscilla Coolidge had sung background on a version of the song for a prospective album by Priscilla's husband Booker T. Jones; when that album was shelved, Coolidge asked him if she could cut the song using his arrangement.

Released as a single, Coolidge's version became her first major hit in nine years of recording: the track peaked at No. 2 on the Billboard Hot 100. Cash Box ranked it at No. 1. "Higher and Higher" also reached No. 1 in Canada. Both the song and a subsequent release, "We're All Alone", earned Coolidge gold records for each selling a million copies.

In the UK it was released as the follow-up single after "We're All Alone" which had reached No. 6, but it only achieved a peak of No. 48 there.

=== Charts ===
==== Weekly charts ====
Chart (1977)	Peak position
Australia (Kent Music Report)	6
Canada Top Singles (RPM)	1
Canada Adult Contemporary (RPM)	3
New Zealand (RIANZ)	7
UK (Official Charts Company)	48
US Billboard Hot 100	2
US Adult Contemporary (Billboard)	5
US Cash Box Top 100	1

==== Year-end charts ====
Chart (1977)	Rank
Australia	28
Canada (RPM)	13
New Zealand	22
US Billboard Hot 100	8
US Cash Box Top 100	8

== Kevin Borg version ==
In 2008, Kevin Borg performed the song, still known as "Higher and Higher", and became the winner of season eight of Sweden's version of Idol. The version charted in Sweden, peaking at number twenty-nine.

== See also ==
- List of Cash Box Top 100 number-one singles of 1977
