= I'm Comin' on Back to You =

"I'm Comin' on Back to You" is a popular song by Jackie Wilson released in 1961. The single peaked at No. 19 on the Billboard Hot 100.
