= You Better Know It =

Single by Jackie Wilson

from the album Lonely Teardrops
- B-side: "Never Go Away"
- Released: 1959
- Recorded: 1959
- Genre: R&B
- Length: 1:59
- Label: Brunswick
- Songwriter(s): Jackie Wilson, Norm Henry

Jackie Wilson singles chronology
"I'll Be Satisfied" (1959)	"You Better Know It" (1959)	"Talk That Talk" (1959)

"You Better Know It" is a 1959 single by recorded and written by Jackie Wilson, who collaborated with Brunswick Records staff songwriter Norm Henry. Although the single made the Top 40, it was not as successful as Wilson's previous entries, peaking at number thirty-seven. On the R&B chart, the single was Wilson's second number one, a position it held for one week.

"You Better Know It" was used in the 1959 film Go, Johnny, Go!, which starred Alan Freed and featured Wilson, among several other early rock and roll stars.
