= Reet Petite =

- Picture cover of 1986 reissue

Single by Jackie Wilson

from the album He's So Fine
- B-side: "By the Light of the Silvery Moon"
- Released: August 1957
- Length: 2:40
- Label: Brunswick US (1957) 9-55024; Vogue Coral UK (1957) Q 72290; SMP UK (1985) SKM 3 BR Music Belgium (1985) 1245095; Columbia US (1987) 07329; Carrere France (1987) 72012
- Songwriters: Berry Gordy, Billy Davis, Gwen Gordy Fuqua
- Producer: Dick Jacobs

Jackie Wilson singles chronology
"One Moment with You" (1957)	"Reet Petite" (1957)	"To Be Loved" (1958)

Official audio
- "Reet Petite" on YouTube

"Reet Petite (The Sweetest Girl in Town)" (originally subtitled "The Finest Girl You Ever Want to Meet") is a song written by Berry Gordy, Billy Davis, and Gwen Gordy Fuqua, and made popular by Jackie Wilson in his 1957 recording for the Brunswick label. It was his first solo hit after leaving the Dominoes and, over the years, has become one of his biggest international chart successes. After a 1986 re-release together with a new claymation music video, Reet Petite became UK Christmas number one almost three years after Wilson's death.

== History ==
The song was written by Berry Gordy, Gwen Gordy Fuqua, and Wilson's cousin Roquel "Billy" Davis (though credited under his pseudonym Tyran Carlo on the record) and produced by Dick Jacobs, and its title was taken from the 1948 Louis Jordan song "Reet, Petite and Gone". (In jazz lingo, the term "reet" meant "fantastic".) It was Jackie Wilson's first recording as a solo artist. The song peaked at number 62 on the Billboard Hot 100 in September 1957 and reached number 6 on the UK Singles Chart. With the success of the song, Gordy was able to fund the launch of Motown Records.

=== 1986 re-release ===
The song was reissued in 1986 following the showing of a clay animation video of Wilson singing the song on the BBC2 documentary series Arena. The video was directed by Giblets, a London-based animation studio. The reissued version proved so popular that in December 1986, almost three years after Wilson's death, the song became a number 1 in the UK for four weeks (selling over 700,000 copies) becoming that year's UK Christmas number one, 29 years after its chart debut.

== Track lists ==
Side	Title	Length
Original release
A	"Reet Petite (The Finest Girl You Ever Want to Meet)"	2:40
B	"By the Light of the Silvery Moon"	2:17
1986 re-release
A	"Reet Petite (The Sweetest Girl in Town)"	2:40
B1	"You Brought about a Change in Me"	2:46
B2	"I'm the One to Do It"	2:34

== Charts ==
=== Weekly charts ===
Chart (1957)	Peak position
UK Singles (Official Charts)	6
US Best Sellers in Stores (The Billboard)	62
US Cash Box Top 60	45

Chart (1986−1987)	Peak position
Australia (Kent Music Report)	20
Austria (Ö3 Austria Top 40)	15
Belgium (Ultratop 50 Flanders)	1
Europe (European Hot 100 Singles)	2
Finland (Suomen virallinen lista)	1
France (SNEP)	24
Ireland (IRMA)	1
Italy Airplay (Music & Media)	13
Netherlands (Dutch Top 40)	1
Netherlands (Single Top 100)	1
New Zealand (Recorded Music NZ)	4
Norway (VG-lista)	5
Spain (AFYVE)	3
Sweden (Sverigetopplistan)	10
Switzerland (Schweizer Hitparade)	3
UK Singles (Official Charts)	1
West Germany (GfK)	4

=== Year-end charts ===
Chart (1986)	Position
UK Singles (OCC)	17

Chart (1987)	Position
Belgium (Ultratop)	1
Europe (European Hot 100 Singles)	15
Netherlands (Dutch Top 40)	15
Netherlands (Single Top 100)	12
New Zealand (RIANZ)	12
UK Singles (OCC)	58
West Germany (Media Control)	30

== Certifications ==
Region	Certification	Certified units/sales
United Kingdom (BPI)	Gold	500,000^{^}
^{^} Shipments figures based on certification alone.

== Other versions ==
- The song was recorded in September 1964 by Dinah Lee and reached the number 1 position in New Zealand and a number 6 position in Melbourne (Australia did not have a national chart at that time).

== See also ==
- List of posthumous number-one singles (UK)
