= Whispers (Gettin' Louder) =

Single by Jackie Wilson

from the album Whispers
- B-side: "The Fairest of Them All"
- Released: August 1966
- Genre: Chicago soul
- Length: 2:15
- Label: Brunswick
- Songwriters: Barbara Acklin, David Scott
- Producer: Carl Davis

Jackie Wilson singles chronology
"I Believe" (1966)	"Whispers (Gettin' Louder)" (1966)	"I Don't Want to Lose You" (1967)

"Whispers (Gettin' Louder)" is a song written by Barbara Acklin and David Scott, recorded and released by Jackie Wilson in 1966.

== Background ==
"Whispers (Gettin' Louder)" features instrumentation by the Funk Brothers and backing vocals by The Andantes. The song's B-side, "(Far from) The Fairest of Them All", was written by Buddy Scott and Jimmy Radcliffe and originally intended for presentation to Ray Charles.

== Chart performance ==
The single peaked at No. 11 on the Billboard Hot 100 singles chart and No. 5 on the Top Selling R&B Singles chart.

== Cover versions ==
- In 1967, The Isley Brothers included it on their Soul on the Rocks LP.
