= Baby Workout =

Single by Jackie Wilson

from the album Baby Workout
- B-side: "I'm Going Crazy (Gotta Get You Off My Mind)"
- Released: March 1963
- Genre: R&B
- Length: 3:02
- Label: Brunswick Records
- Songwriter(s): Alonzo Tucker, Jackie Wilson

Jackie Wilson singles chronology
"What Good Am I Without You" (1963)	"Baby Workout" (1963)	"Shake a Hand" (1963)

"Baby Workout" is an R&B song by Jackie Wilson from the 1963 album of the same name. The track is about Wilson urging a girl to dance (work out) all night with him. It was Wilson's biggest hit of his singles that charted on both the Billboard Hot 100 and the Hot R&B/Hip-Hop Songs. It was his fifth and penultimate #1 R&B song. It was his second highest-charting song on the pop charts, peaking at #5. It was written by Wilson and good friend Alonzo Tucker, an original member of the famed 1950s Doo Wop group, the Midnighters.

George Benson covered the song for his 1990 album Big Boss Band. It was also released as a single.
