= Dick Jacobs =

American songwriter

- Born: 29 March 1918; New York City, New York, U.S.
- Died: 20 May 1988 (aged 70) New York City, New York, U.S.
- Occupations: Musician; conductor; areranger; orchestrator; music director; A&R director
- Labels: Coral Records; Decca Records; Brunswick Records; Springboard

Dick Jacobs (29 March 1918 – 20 May 1988) was an American musician, conductor, arranger, orchestrator, music director and an artists-and-repertoire director for several record labels (Coral, Decca, Brunswick and Springboard). He helped Jackie Wilson, Buddy Holly, Bobby Darin and others early in their careers in the late 1950s and early 1960s.

== Life and career ==
Jacobs was born in New York City, United States, and graduated from New York University. During World War II, he served in the United States Army, then returned to the city and spent several years arranging for Tommy Dorsey. After that, he partnered with Sy Oliver to pursue freelance arranging work.

When he was hired to be the musical director for the television series, Your Hit Parade, for its 1957–58 season, he replaced most of the existing studio orchestra members with his own choices including Dick Hyman, Don Lamond, Al Caiola and Jerome Richardson. At that point, the Hit Parade orchestra became one of the first on-screen orchestras to become integrated. In 1953, he produced a number of acts, including the McGuire Sisters and Teresa Brewer, and by 1958 had a hit single, the theme tune from the movie Kathy-O. In 1956, his recording of "Man with the Golden Arm" sold over one million copies as a single and was awarded a gold disc.

According to The Ultimate Book of Songs and Artists, by Joel Whitburn, Jacobs's biggest hits were "Main Title" and "Molly-O" (1956), "Petticoats of Portugal" (1956), and "Fascination" (1957).

Jacobs brought a lush instrumental orchestral sound to a number of rock and roll songs in the late 1950s, notably those for Buddy Holly and Cirino Colacrai and his vocal quartet, the Bowties. Eventually retiring in the late 1970s, he and Harriet Jacobs wrote Who Wrote That Song?, a reference book on popular songs and songwriters.

He died in 1988 in New York City, at the age of 70.

== Selected discography ==
=== Singles ===
- Coral 61606 – "Molly-O" / "Butternut" (1956)
- Coral 61692 – "Seven Wonders of the World" / "Theme from "East of Eden"" (1956)
- Coral 61724 – "Petticoats of Portugal" / "Song of the Vagabonds-Only A Rose" (1956)
- Coral 61794 – "Big Beat" / "Tower's Trot and Then You Do That Step" (1957)
- Coral 61864 – "Fascination" / "Summertime in Venice" (1957)
- Coral 61907 – "Place Pigalle" / "Lovely Ladies of Milano" (1957)
- Coral 61951 – "Mambo No. 5" / "Marchin' Drummer Blues" (1958)
- Coral 62086 – "A Touch of Pink" / "Happy People of Monterrey" (1959)

=== Albums ===
- Main Title (with George Cates Orchestra & Chorus) – Coral CRL-57065
- The Man With the Golden Baton – Coral CRL-57127
- Themes from Horror Movies – Coral CRL-57240
- Written In the Stars (The Zodiac Suite) – Coral CRL-57339
- Fascination – Vocalion VL-3672

=== Sidework ===
Jacobs did arrangements for jazz and popular singers and musicians, ranging from Cab Calloway, Teresa Brewer and Xavier Cugat to Buddy Holly and Jackie Wilson.

== Bibliography ==
- Press, Jaques Cattell (Ed.). ASCAP Biographical Dictionary of Composers, Authors and Publishers, 4th edition, R. R. Bowker, 1980.
- Nite, Norm N.; Clark, Dick. Rock on. The Illustrated Encyclopedia of Rock n' Roll. The Solid Gold Years, Harper & Row, 1982.
- Whitburn, Joel. The Billboard Book of Top 40 Hits, 5th edition, Watson-Guptill Publications, 1992.
