= I'll Be Satisfied =

1959 single by Jackie Wilson

Single by Jackie Wilson

from the album So Much
- B-side: "Ask"
- Released: June 1959
- Genre: R&B
- Length: 2:09
- Label: Brunswick; Coral
- Songwriters: Berry Gordy; Gwen Gordy Fuqua; Tyran Carlo

Jackie Wilson singles chronology
"That's Why (I Love You So)" (1959)	"I'll Be Satisfied" (1959)	"You Better Know It" (1959)

"I'll Be Satisfied" is a popular song. Recorded and released by Jackie Wilson in 1959, the single peaked at #20 on the Billboard Hot 100, and was a Top 10 R&B hit, peaking at # 6. It was written, like many of Wilson's early hits, by future Motown founder Berry Gordy along with Gordy's sister Gwendolyn and Roquel "Billy" Davis, writing under his songwriting alias of Tyran Carlo. This up-tempo rocker could best be described as "proto Motown", featuring many of the musical and lyrical features that Gordy would employ on his later recordings for his Motown Records label.

The song was covered by Shakin' Stevens in 1982. It reached no. 10 in the UK chart and no. 5 in the Irish chart.

== Charts ==
Chart (1959)	Peak position
US Billboard Hot 100	20
US Hot R&B/Hip-Hop Songs (Billboard)	6

== Shakin' Stevens version ==
"I'll Be Satisfied"

Single by Shakin' Stevens

from the album Give Me Your Heart Tonight
- B-side: "Don't Be Late (Miss Kate)"
- Released: 8 October 1982
- Recorded: 1981
- Studio: Eden Studios, London
- Genre: Rock and roll
- Length: 3:12
- Label: Epic
- Songwriters: Berry Gordy; Tyran Carlo
- Producer: Stuart Colman

Shakin' Stevens singles chronology
"Give Me Your Heart Tonight" (1982)	"I'll Be Satisfied" (1982)	"Vanessa" (1982)

In 1982, Welsh singer Shakin' Stevens released a cover of the song for his album Give Me Your Heart Tonight. It peaked at number 10 on the UK Singles Chart.

=== Charts ===
Chart (1982)	Peak position
Belgium (Ultratop 50 Flanders)	19
Denmark (Hitlisten)	8
Germany (GfK)	27
Ireland (IRMA)	5
Netherlands (Dutch Top 40)	26
Netherlands (Single Top 100)	25
UK Singles (Official Charts)	10
