= Jackie Wilson =

American soul and R&B singer (1934–1984)

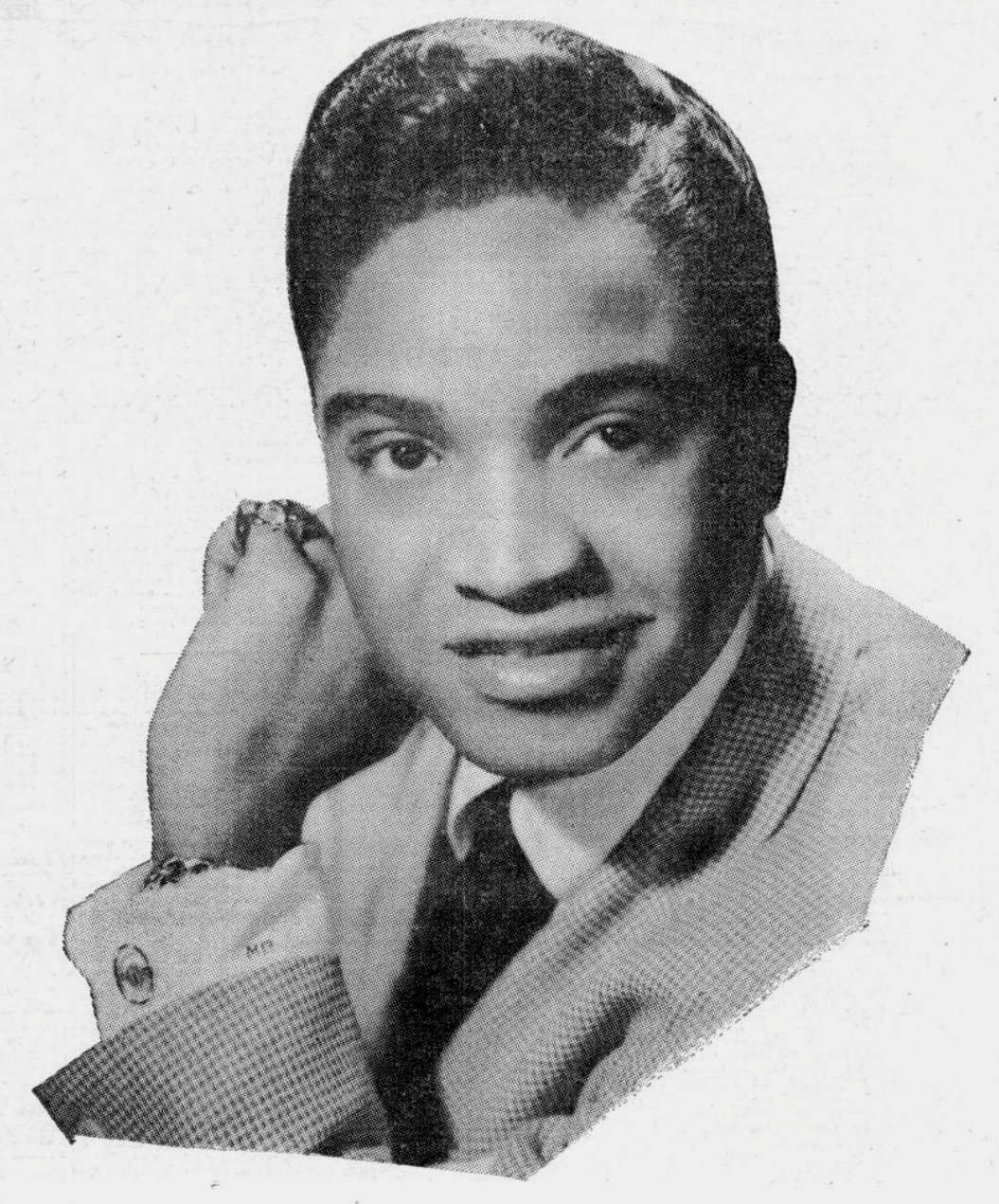
- Wilson in 1961

Background information
- Also known as: Mr. Excitement
- Born: Jack Leroy Wilson Jr. June 9, 1934; Highland Park, Michigan, U.S.
- Died: January 21, 1984 (aged 49) Mount Holly, New Jersey, U.S.
- Genres: R&B; soul; pop; rock and roll; doo-wop
- Occupations: Singer; songwriter
- Years active: 1953–1975
- Labels: Dee Gee; King; Federal; Brunswick

Jack Leroy Wilson Jr. (June 9, 1934 – January 21, 1984) was an American singer who was a prominent figure in the transition of rhythm and blues into soul. Nicknamed "Mr. Excitement", he was considered a master showman and one of the most dynamic singers and performers in the 20th century. Among Wilson's hits are "Lonely Teardrops," "Baby Workout," "Reet Petite", "I Get the Sweetest Feeling", and "(Your Love Keeps Lifting Me) Higher and Higher". His performance style is often cited as a significant influence on contemporary and later artists such as Elvis Presley, James Brown, and Michael Jackson.

Born in the Detroit enclave of Highland Park, Michigan, Wilson initially gained fame as a member of the R&B vocal group Billy Ward and His Dominoes. He went solo in 1957 and scored more than 50 chart singles spanning the genres of R&B, rock 'n' roll, soul, doo-wop and easy listening. This included 16 top-10 R&B hits, six of which ranked as number ones. On the Billboard Hot 100, Wilson scored 14 top-20 pop hits, six of which reached the top 10. In 1975, Wilson suffered a heart attack during a performance, which left him in a minimally conscious state until his death nine years later.

Wilson was posthumously inducted to the Rock and Roll Hall of Fame in 1987. He was also inducted into the National Rhythm & Blues Hall of Fame. In 1999, two of Wilson's recordings were inducted into the Grammy Hall of Fame. He was honored with the Legacy Tribute Award from the Rhythm and Blues Foundation four years later. In 2004, Rolling Stone magazine ranked Wilson No. 69 on its list of the 100 Greatest Artists of All Time, and placed him on their list of the 200 Greatest Singers of All Time (2023). NPR named Wilson one of the 50 Great Voices.

== Life and career ==
=== Early years ===
Jack Leroy Wilson Jr. was born on June 9, 1934, in Highland Park, Michigan, the third and only surviving child of Eliza Mae Wilson (1900–1975) and singer Jack Leroy Wilson Sr. (1903–1983). As a child, to distinguish himself from his father, Wilson was given the name "Sonny". Eliza Mae was born on the Billups-Whitfield Place in Lowndes County, Mississippi, to Virginia and Tom Ransom. Wilson often visited his family in Columbus and was greatly influenced by the choir at Billups Chapel. Wilson's father was frequently absent and usually unemployed, and in 1943, the Wilsons separated shortly after Jackie's ninth birthday. Growing up in the suburban Detroit enclave of Highland Park, Wilson joined a gang called the Shakers and often got himself into trouble.

Wilson began singing as a youth, accompanying his mother, an experienced church-choir singer. In his early teens, Wilson joined the Ever Ready Gospel Singers, who gained popularity in local churches. Wilson was not very religious, but he enjoyed singing in public. The money the quartet earned from performing was often spent on alcohol, and Wilson began drinking at an early age.

Wilson dropped out of high school at age 15, having been sentenced twice to detention in the Lansing Corrections system for juveniles. During his second stint in detention, Wilson learned to box and began competing in the Detroit amateur circuit at age 16. His record in the Golden Gloves was 2–8. After his mother forced him to quit boxing, Wilson and his girlfriend, Freda Hood, got pregnant, and her father forced him to marry her. Wilson became a father at age 17.

=== Early career ===
Wilson began working at Lee's Sensation Club as a solo singer, then formed a group called the Falcons (not to be confused with the Detroit-based group that recorded the 1959 hit, "You're So Fine") that included cousin Levi Stubbs, who later led the Four Tops. (Note: Two more of Wilson's cousins, Hubert Johnson and Levi's brother Joe, later became members of the Contours.) The other Falcons joined Hank Ballard as part of the Midnighters, including Alonzo Tucker and Billy Davis, who worked with Wilson several years later as a solo artist. Tucker and Wilson collaborated as songwriters on a few songs Wilson recorded, including his 1963 hit "Baby Workout".

Wilson was discovered by talent agent Johnny Otis, who recruited him for a group called the Thrillers. That group evolved into the Royals (who later became R&B group, the Midnighters, though Wilson was not part of the group when it changed its name and signed with King Records). Wilson signed on with Detroit music impresario Al Green (Note: not to be confused with R&B singer Al Green or Albert "Al" Green of the now defunct National Records). Green, who also managed LaVern Baker, Little Willie John, Johnnie Ray and Della Reese, owned two music publishing companies, Pearl Music and Merrimac Music; and Detroit's Flame Show Bar, where Wilson met Baker.

After Wilson recorded his first version of "Danny Boy" and a few other tracks on Dizzy Gillespie's record label Dee Gee Records under his nickname, Sonny Wilson, he was eventually hired by Billy Ward in 1953 to join a group Ward formed in 1950 called the Dominoes after Wilson's successful audition to replace the immensely popular Clyde McPhatter, who left the Dominoes and formed the Drifters. Wilson almost blew his chance that day, showing up calling himself "The shit" Wilson and bragging about being a better singer than McPhatter.

Billy Ward felt a stage name would better fit the Dominoes' image, hence Jackie Wilson. Before leaving the Dominoes, McPhatter coached Wilson on the sound Billy Ward wanted for his group, influencing Wilson's singing style and stage presence. Wilson said, "I learned a lot from Clyde, that high-pitched choke he used and other things ... Clyde McPhatter was my man. Clyde and Billy Ward." 1940s blues singer Roy Brown was also a major influence on him, and Wilson grew up listening to the Mills Brothers, the Ink Spots, Louis Jordan, and Al Jolson.

Wilson was the group's lead singer for three years, but the Dominoes lost some of their stride with the departure of McPhatter. They made appearances riding on the strength of the group's earlier hits, until 1956 when the Dominoes recorded Wilson with an interpretation of the pop hit "St. Therese of the Roses", giving the Dominoes another brief moment in the spotlight. (Their only other post-McPhatter/Wilson successes were "Stardust", released July 15, 1957, and "Deep Purple", released October 7, 1957.) In 1957, Wilson left the Dominoes to start a solo career and secured performances at Detroit's Flame Show Bar. Green secured a deal with Decca Records, and Wilson was signed to its subsidiary label Brunswick. Shortly before Wilson signed a solo contract with Brunswick, Green died suddenly and unexpectedly. Green's business partner Nat Tarnopol took over as Wilson's manager (and ultimately rose to president of Brunswick).

=== Solo stardom ===
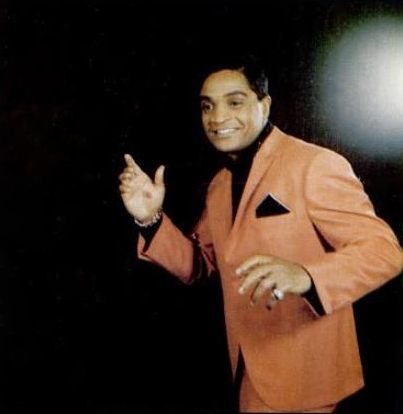
Wilson in 1966

Wilson released his first Brunswick single, "Reet Petite", in 1957. It would be Wilson's first entry on the Billboard charts, peaking at number 62 on the pre-Hot 100 main pop singles chart, the Top 100. It was Wilson's first collaboration with future Motown Records founder Berry Gordy Jr. with partner Roquel "Billy" Davis (using the pseudonym Tyran Carlo) and Gordy's sister Gwendolyn. The trio composed and produced six additional singles for Wilson: "To Be Loved", "I'm Wanderin'", "We Have Love", "That's Why (I Love You So)", "I'll Be Satisfied", and Wilson's late-1958 signature song, "Lonely Teardrops", which peaked at No. 7 on the Billboard Hot 100, topped the R&B charts, and established Wilson as an R&B superstar known for his extraordinary, operatic multi-octave vocal range. "Lonely Teardrops" sold over a million copies and was awarded a gold disc by the RIAA.

Wilson's fervor when performing, his dynamic dance moves, impassioned singing, and fashion sense, earned him the nickname "Mr. Excitement", a moniker that remained throughout his career. His stagecraft in his live shows inspired James Brown, Teddy Pendergrass, Michael Jackson, and Elvis Presley, as well as a host of other artists that followed. Presley was so impressed with Wilson that he set out to meet him, and they instantly became good friends. In a photo of the two posing together, Presley's caption in the autograph reads: "You got you a friend for life". Wilson was sometimes called "The Black Elvis". Reportedly, when asked about this, Presley said, "I guess that makes me the white Jackie Wilson." Wilson also said he was influenced by Presley, saying, "A lot of people have accused Elvis of stealing the black man's music, when in fact, almost every black solo entertainer copied his stage mannerisms from Elvis."

Wilson's powerful, electrifying live performances rarely failed to bring audiences to a state of frenzy. His live performances consisted of knee-drops, splits, spins, back-flips, one-footed across-the-floor slides, removing his tie and jacket and throwing them off the stage, basic boxing steps like advance and retreat shuffling, and one of his favorite routines, getting some of the less attractive women in the audience to come up to the stage and kiss him. Wilson often said, "If I get the ugliest girl in the audience to come up and kiss me, they'll all think they can have me and keep coming back and buying my records."

Wilson was a regular on TV, making regular appearances on such shows as The Ed Sullivan Show, American Bandstand, Shindig!, Shivaree and Hullabaloo. His only movie appearance was in the rock and roll film Go, Johnny, Go!, where Wilson performed his 1959 hit song "You Better Know It".

In 1958, Davis and Gordy left Wilson and Brunswick after royalty disputes escalated between them and Nat Tarnopol. Davis soon became a successful staff songwriter and producer for Chess Records, while Gordy borrowed $800 from his family and used money that he earned from royalties writing for Wilson to start his own recording studio, Hitsville USA, the foundation of Motown Records in his native Detroit. Meanwhile, convinced that Wilson could venture out of R&B and rock and roll, Tarnopol had the singer record operatic ballads and easy-listening material, pairing him with Decca Records' veteran arranger Dick Jacobs.

The collaboration led to several crossover pop hits at the dawn of the 1960s, including the top twenty hit, "Doggin' Around" and the top five pop ballad, "Night", which became another million-seller, as well as the top ten singles, "Alone at Last" and "My Empty Arms". In 1961, Wilson recorded a tribute album to Al Jolson, Nowstalgia ... You Ain't Heard Nothin' Yet, which included the only album liner notes he ever wrote: "... to the greatest entertainer of this or any other era ... I guess I have just about every recording he's ever made, and I rarely missed listening to him on the radio ... During the three years I've been making records, I've had the ambition to do an album of songs, which, to me, represent the great Jolson heritage ... This is simply my humble tribute to the one man I admire most in this business ... to keep the heritage of Jolson alive." The album was a commercial failure. The Wilson-Jacobs collaboration turned out to be a mixed result as several singles failed to hit the top 40.

In 1963, Wilson began collaborating with Midnighters singer Alonzo Tucker, resulting in another top five pop hit with "Baby Workout". The Wilson-Tucker pairing led to other songs such as "No Pity (In The Naked City)" and "I'm So Lonely", producing only moderate results. Wilson hit a commercial lull at the end of 1963, despite artistic collaborations with Count Basie, LaVern Baker and Linda Hopkins. As a result, his popularity dropped as soul music evolved, including in his native Detroit, where Motown artists such as Marvin Gaye and Stevie Wonder began enjoying commercial success.

In 1966, Wilson teamed with established Chicago soul producer Carl Davis and produced several hit singles resulting in a brief comeback to the top of the charts. Among the hits included "Whispers (Gettin' Louder)", "I Get the Sweetest Feeling" and what would become one of his biggest chart successes, "(Your Love Keeps Lifting Me) Higher and Higher", which peaked at number six on the Hot 100. "Higher and Higher" would turn out to be Wilson's sixth and final top ten single on the pop charts. Despite its modest top 40 pop success, "I Get the Sweetest Feeling" would enjoy success posthumously, spawning covers by Edwin Starr, Will Young, Erma Franklin and Liz McClarnon.

A key to Wilson's musical rebirth was Davis insisting that he no longer record with Brunswick's musicians in New York; instead, Wilson recorded with Detroit musicians normally employed by Motown Records and also Davis's own Chicago-based session players. The Detroit musicians, known as the Funk Brothers, participated on Wilson's recordings due to their respect for Davis and Wilson.

After 1968, Wilson no longer enjoyed top 40 success on the Hot 100 but would occasionally find R&B success. Wilson's final significant hit on any chart was "You Got Me Walkin'", written by Eugene Record of the Chi-Lites, another successful act on Brunswick, which reached number 22 on the Billboard Hot Soul Singles chart in March 1972 with the Chi-Lites backing him on vocals and instruments.

== Personal life ==
Wilson converted to Judaism as an adult. He recorded a version of Lew Pollack and Jack Yellen's famed Jewish-themed song "My Yiddishe Momme" in New York in November 1960.

Wilson had a reputation for being short-tempered and promiscuous. In her autobiography, Patti LaBelle accused Wilson of sexually assaulting her backstage at Brooklyn's Brevoort Theatre in the 1960s.

On February 15, 1961, in Manhattan, Wilson was seriously wounded when Juanita Jones, one of his girlfriends, shot him in a jealous rage when Wilson returned to his Manhattan apartment with another woman, fashion model Harlean Harris, an ex-girlfriend of Sam Cooke (and later Wilson's second wife). Wilson's management supposedly concocted the story about her being a zealous fan in order to protect Wilson's reputation. They claimed that Jones, obsessed with Wilson, had threatened to shoot herself and that the singer's intervention resulted in him being shot. Wilson was shot in the stomach; the wound resulted in the loss of a kidney, and the bullet lodged too close to his spine to be removed.

In early 1975, during an interview with author Arnold Shaw, Wilson maintained that he was actually shot by a zealous fan that he did not know. Wilson stated: "We also had some trouble in 1961. That was when some crazy chick took a shot at me and nearly put me away for good..." No charges were brought against Jones.

=== Legal troubles ===
In 1960, Wilson was arrested and charged with assaulting a police officer when fans tried to climb on stage in New Orleans. Wilson assaulted a policeman who had shoved one of the fans.

In 1964, Wilson jumped from a second-floor window at Kiel Auditorium in St. Louis to avoid being arrested after a show. His arrest stemmed from a default of a $2,260 civil judgment relating to his failure to appear at the Club Riviera in 1959. Wilson was caught by the police and jailed for a day before posting a $3,000 bond.

In March 1967, Wilson and his drummer, Jimmy Smith, were arrested in South Carolina on "morals charges"; the two were entertaining two 24-year-old white women in their motel room.

=== Financial issues ===
In 1961, Wilson declared annual earnings of $263,000, while the average annual salary at that time was just $5,000, but he discovered that he was broke, despite being at the peak of his success. Around this time, the IRS seized Wilson's Detroit family home. Tarnopol and his accountants were supposed to take care of such matters. Wilson made arrangements with the IRS to make restitution on the unpaid taxes; he also re-purchased the family home at auction. Nat Tarnopol had taken advantage of Wilson's naïveté, mismanaging his money since becoming his manager. Tarnopol also had power of attorney over Wilson's finances.

Tarnopol and 18 other Brunswick executives were indicted on federal charges of mail fraud and tax evasion stemming from bribery and payola scandals in 1975. Also in the indictment was the charge that Tarnopol owed at least $1 million in royalties to Wilson. In 1976, Tarnopol and the others were found guilty; an appeals court overturned their conviction 18 months later. Although the conviction was overturned, judges went into detail, outlining that Tarnopol and Brunswick Records did defraud their artists of royalties, and that they were satisfied that there was sufficient evidence for Wilson to file a lawsuit. However, a trial to sue Tarnopol for royalties never took place, as Wilson lay in a nursing home semi-comatose. Tarnopol never paid Wilson monies he had coming to him, and Wilson died owing money to Brunswick Records and an estimated $300,000 to the IRS.

=== Marriages and children ===
At age 17, Wilson married his pregnant girlfriend, Freda Hazel Hood (1933-1999), in 1951. They had four children: Jacqueline Denise (1951–1988), Sandra Kay (1953–1977), Jackie Jr. (1954–1970), and Anthony Duane (1958-2021). Hood divorced Wilson in 1965 after 14 years of marriage, as she was frustrated with his notorious womanizing.

In 1967, Wilson married his second wife, model Harlean Harris (1937–2019), at the urging of Nat Tarnopol, who thought the marriage would help repair Wilson's public image. They had been dating since at least 1960 and their son, John Dominick (known as Petey), was born in 1963. Wilson and Harris legally separated in 1969. They never officially divorced, but at the time he had his heart attack in 1975, Wilson was in a relationship with a woman named Lynn Guidry, who was under the impression that she was his legal wife. Harris was the one who became his court-appointed guardian in 1978.

In September 1970, Wilson's 16-year-old son, Jackie Jr., was shot and killed on a neighbor's porch near their Detroit home. Wilson became depressed for a period, remaining a near-recluse for the next few years. He turned to drug abuse and continued to drink in an attempt to cope with the loss of his son. Additionally, both of Wilson's daughters died young: Sandra died in 1977 at age 24 of an apparent heart attack, and her older sister Jacqueline was killed by a gunshot to the back in 1988 in Highland Park, Michigan.

Wilson also fathered many out-of-wedlock children with different women, including singer Bobby Brooks Wilson, who performs his father's songs in tribute.

== Illness and death ==
On September 29, 1975, Wilson was one of the featured acts in Dick Clark's Good Ol' Rock and Roll Revue, hosted by the Latin Casino in Cherry Hill, New Jersey. He was in the middle of singing "Lonely Teardrops" when he suffered a massive heart attack. On the words "My heart is crying", Wilson collapsed on stage; audience members applauded as they initially thought it was part of the act. However, Clark sensed that something was wrong and ordered the musicians to stop the music. Cornell Gunter of the Coasters, who was backstage, noticed that Wilson was not breathing. Gunter was able to resuscitate him, and Wilson was then rushed to a nearby hospital. According to Larry Geller, Wilson wanted to sweat profusely during his performances, explaining to Elvis Presley, "The chicks love it." To induce the effect, Wilson would take a handful of salt tablets and drink a large amount of water before going onstage. High salt consumption is known to be a risk factor for heart disease.

Medical personnel worked to stabilize Wilson's vital signs, but the lack of oxygen to his brain caused Wilson to slip into a coma. He briefly recovered in early 1976, and was even able to take a few wobbly steps, but Wilson eventually slipped back into a semi-comatose state.

Wilson's friend, fellow singer Bobby Womack, planned a benefit at the Hollywood Palladium to raise funds for Wilson on March 4, 1976. Wilson was deemed conscious but incapacitated in early June 1976, aware of his surroundings but unable to speak. Wilson was a resident of the Medford Leas Retirement Center in Medford, New Jersey, when he was admitted into Memorial Hospital of Burlington County in Mount Holly, New Jersey, due to having trouble taking nourishment, according to his attorney John Mulkerin. Elvis Presley covered a large portion of Wilson's medical bills. Wilson's friend, Joyce McRae, tried to become his caregiver while he was in the nursing home, but Wilson was placed in the guardianship of his estranged wife Harlean Harris and her lawyer John Mulkerin in 1978.

Wilson died on January 21, 1984, at age 49 from complications of pneumonia. His funeral was held at Russell Street Baptist Church. Wilson was initially buried in an unmarked grave at Westlawn Cemetery near Detroit.

In 1987, fans raised money in a fundraiser spearheaded by Orlando disc jockey "Jack the Rapper" Gibson to purchase a mausoleum. A ceremony was held on June 9, 1987, his 53rd birthday, and Wilson was interred in the mausoleum at Westlawn Cemetery in Wayne, Michigan. His mother, Eliza Wilson, who had died in 1975, was also placed in the mausoleum.

== Tributes and legacy ==
Van Morrison recorded a tribute song called "Jackie Wilson Said (I'm in Heaven When You Smile)" on his 1972 album Saint Dominic's Preview. It was covered by Dexys Midnight Runners in 1982.

After Wilson's death, Michael Jackson paid tribute to him at the 1984 Grammy Awards. Jackson dedicated his Album of the Year Grammy for Thriller to Wilson, saying, "Some people are entertainers and some people are great entertainers. Some people are followers. And some people make the path and are pioneers. I'd like to say Jackie Wilson was a wonderful entertainer. He's not with us anymore, but Jackie, where you are I'd like to say, I love you and thank you so much."

In 1985, the Commodores recorded "Nightshift" in memory of Wilson and soul singer Marvin Gaye, who had both died in 1984.

Wilson scored a posthumous hit in Europe when "Reet Petite" topped the charts in the Netherlands, the Republic of Ireland and the United Kingdom in 1986. This success was likely due in part to a new animated video made for the song, featuring a clay model of Wilson, that became popular on the BBC2 TV network in the latter country. The following year, Wilson's posthumous charting success in the United Kingdom continued when he hit the UK Singles Chart again with "I Get the Sweetest Feeling" (number three) and "(Your Love Keeps Lifting Me) Higher and Higher" (number 15).

In Berry Gordy's 1994 autobiography To Be Loved (named for one of the hit tunes he wrote for Wilson), Motown's founder stated that Wilson was "The greatest singer I've ever heard. The epitome of natural greatness. Unfortunately for some, he set the standard I'd be looking for in singers forever".

In 1991, Jimmy Barnes recorded a cover of Higher and Higher for his Soul Deep album.

In 1994, Peter Tork of the Monkees recorded a bluegrass-rock cover of "Higher and Higher" on his first solo album, Stranger Things Have Happened, having previously self-released a single featuring it in 1981. The song remained Tork's signature solo number in subsequent Monkees concert tours.

In the 2010 VH1 television special Say It Loud: A Celebration of Black Music in America, Smokey Robinson and Bobby Womack both paid tribute to Wilson. Robinson explained, "Jackie Wilson was the most dynamic singer and performer that I think I've ever seen." Womack added: "He was the real Elvis Presley, as far as I'm concerned...and Elvis took a lot from him too."

In 2010, Wilson's songs "(Your Love Keeps Lifting Me) Higher and Higher" and "Lonely Teardrops" were ranked No. 248 and No. 315 on Rolling Stone magazine's list of the 500 Greatest Songs of All Time.

In 2014, artist Hozier released a song titled "Jackie and Wilson", which includes the lyrics "We'll name our children Jackie and Wilson and raise them on rhythm and blues."

In 2016, Cottage Grove Street in Detroit was renamed Jackie Wilson Lane in his honor.

In 2018, Hologram USA Networks Inc. launched the hologram stage show, Higher & Higher: The Jackie Wilson Story.

During their 2019–20 season, "(Your Love Keeps Lifting Me) Higher and Higher" was played following every home win by the NHL's St. Louis Blues.

During the 2024 Democratic National Convention, Wilson's song "(Your Love Keeps Lifting Me) Higher and Higher" was played to introduce President Joe Biden before his speech.

In 2025, Elliot James Reay released a song "Who Knew Dancing Was a Sin" in which he pays homage to Wilson with the lyrics: "Oh, 'cause it's too much of a risk. To tell her who my Jackie is". The song explores a partner's unfounded suspicion of infidelity, with the partner holding up a record of Wilson in the accompanying video clip, while in truth, Reay was just out dancing the night away to Northern Soul music.

=== Portrayals in the media ===
- In 1987, Wilson was portrayed in the Ritchie Valens biographical film La Bamba by Howard Huntsberry.
- In 1992, Wilson was portrayed in the ABC miniseries by Grady Harrell in The Jacksons: An American Dream.
- In 1999, Wilson was portrayed by Leon Robinson in the NBC television film Mr. Rock 'n' Roll: The Alan Freed Story.
- In 1999, Wilson was portrayed by Sananda Maitreya, then known professionally as Terence Trent D'Arby, in the television film Shake, Rattle & Roll.
- In 2000, Wilson was portrayed by Chester Gregory in the Black Ensemble Theater of Chicago's musical production about Wilson's life.
- In 2019, Wilson was portrayed by Jeremy Pope in One Night in Miami....

== Awards and nominations ==
- 1987: Wilson was inducted into the Rock and Roll Hall of Fame.
- 2003: Wilson was honored with the Rhythm and Blues Foundation Legacy Tribute Award.
- 2005: Wilson was voted into the Michigan Rock and Roll Legends Hall of Fame.
- 2013: Wilson was inducted into the National Rhythm & Blues Hall of Fame.
- 2019: Wilson was honored with a star on the Hollywood Walk of Fame.

=== Grammy Awards ===
Wilson was nominated for two Grammy Awards. In 1999, his songs "Higher and Higher" and "Lonely Teardrops" were inducted into the Grammy Hall of Fame.

Year	Nominee / work	Award	Result
1968	"Higher and Higher"	Best R&B Solo Vocal Performance, Male	Nominated
1961	"Lonely Teardrops"	Best Rhythm & Blues Performance	Nominated

== Selected discography ==
=== Studio albums ===
- 1958: He's So Fine
- 1959: Lonely Teardrops
- 1959: So Much
- 1960: Jackie Sings the Blues
- 1960: A Woman, a Lover, a Friend
- 1961:You Ain't Heard Nothin' Yet
- 1961: By Special Request
- 1962: Body and Soul
- 1962: Jackie Wilson at the Copa
- 1963: Jackie Wilson Sings the World's Greatest Melodies
- 1963: Baby Workout
- 1963: Shake a Hand (with Linda Hopkins)
- 1963: Merry Christmas from Jackie Wilson
- 1964: Somethin' Else!!!
- 1965: Soul Time
- 1965: Spotlight on Jackie Wilson!
- 1966: Whispers
- 1967: Higher and Higher
- 1968: Manufacturers of Soul (with Count Basie)
- 1968: I Get the Sweetest Feeling
- 1969: Do Your Thing
- 1970: This Love is Real
- 1971: You Got Me Walkin
- 1973: Beautiful Day
- 1976: Nobody But You
