= Hair (Original Broadway Cast Recording) =

Hair: The American Tribal Love-Rock Musical

Cast recording
- Released: 1968
- Recorded: May 6, 1968
- Studios: RCA Victor, New York City
- Genres: Pop rock, psychedelic rock, funk, R&B
- Length: 40:25
- Label: RCA Victor
- Producers: Brian Drutman, Denis McNamara, Norrie Paramor, Andy Wiswell

Hair is a 1968 cast recording of the musical Hair on the RCA Victor label. Sarah Erlewine, for AllMusic, wrote: "The music is heartening and invigorating, including the classics 'Aquarius,' 'Good Morning Starshine,' 'Let the Sunshine In,' 'Frank Mills' ... and 'Easy to Be Hard.' The joy that has been instilled in this original Broadway cast recording shines through, capturing in the performances of creators Gerome Ragni and James Rado exactly what they were aiming for — not to speak for their generation, but to speak for themselves."

The album charted at No. 1 on the Billboard 200, the last Broadway cast album to do so. Hair's cast album stayed at No. 1 for 13 weeks in 1969.

The recording also received a Grammy Award in 1969 for Best Score from an Original Cast Show Album and sold nearly 3 million copies in the U.S. by December 1969. The New York Times noted in 2007 that "The cast album of Hair was ... a must-have for the middle classes. Its exotic orange-and-green cover art imprinted itself instantly and indelibly on the psyche. ... [It] became a pop-rock classic that, like all good pop, has an appeal that transcends particular tastes for genre or period." In 2018, the Original Broadway Cast Recording was added to the National Recording Registry.

== Track listing ==
Music by Galt MacDermot; lyrics by Gerome Ragni and James Rado.

1. "Aquarius" 2:55 — Ronnie Dyson
2. "Donna" 2:08 — Gerome Ragni
3. "Hashish" 1:03 — Cast
4. "Sodomy" 0:50 Steve Curry
5. "Colored Spade" 1:10 — Lamont Washington
6. "Manchester England" 1:20 — James Rado
7. "I'm Black" 0:36 — Lamont Washington, Steve Curry, Gerome Ragni, James Rado
8. "Ain't Got No" 0:43 — Steve Curry, Lamont Washington, Melba Moore
9. "I Believe In Love" 1:06 — Melba Moore*
10. "Ain't Got No" (reprise) 1:16 — Steve Curry, Lamont Washington, Melba Moore
11. "Air" 1:15 — Sally Eaton, Shelley Plimpton, Melba Moore
12. "Initials (LBJ)" 0:55 — Cast
13. "I Got Life" 3:05 — James Rado
14. "Going Down" 2:18 — Gerome Ragni*
15. "Hair" 2:55 — James Rado, Gerome Ragni
16. "My Conviction" 1:36 — Jonathan Kramer
17. "Easy to Be Hard" 2:35 — Lynn Kellogg
18. "Don't Put It Down" 2:00 — Steve Curry, Gerome Ragni
19. "Frank Mills" 2:05 — Shelley Plimpton
20. "Be-In (Hare Krishna)" 3:00 — Cast
21. "Where Do I Go?" 2:40 — James Rado
22. "Electric Blues" 2:35 — Paul Jabara*
23. "Manchester England" (Reprise) 0:30 — James Rado
24. "Black Boys" 1:10 — Diane Keaton, Suzannah Norstrand, Natalie Mosco
25. "White Boys" 2:28 — Melba Moore, Lorrie Davis & Emmaretta Marks
26. "Walking In Space" 5:00 — Cast
27. "Abie Baby" 2:45 — Lamont Washington, Ronnie Dyson, Donnie Burks & Lorrie Davis
28. "Three-Five-Zero-Zero" 3:09 — Cast
29. "What a Piece of Work is Man" 1:36 — Ronnie Dyson & Walter Michael Harris
30. "Good Morning Starshine" 2:30 — Lynn Kellogg, Melba Moore, James Rado, Gerome Ragni
31. "The Bed" 2:56 — Cast*
32. "The Flesh Failures (Let the Sunshine In)" 3:35 — James Rado, Lynn Kellogg, Melba Moore

* The original LP release (RCA Victor LSO-1150) omitted a few tracks due to space limitations: "I Believe In Love", "Going Down", "Electric Blues" and "The Bed", as well as short reprises, and placed "Easy to Be Hard" after "Black Boys/White Boys". The full track list above was included on later CD issues.

== Charts ==
Chart (1968/70)	Position
United States (Billboard 200)	1
Australia (Kent Music Report)	2

== Certifications and sales ==
Region	Certification	Certified units/sales
Austria (IFPI Austria)	Gold	25,000^{*}
United States (RIAA)	Gold	3,000,000
Summaries
Worldwide	—	5,000,000
^{*} Sales figures based on certification alone.

== Credits ==
- Alan Fontaine, Steve Gillette – guitar
- Jimmy Lewis – bass
- Galt MacDermot – piano, electric piano, orchestra director
- Idris Muhammad – drums
- Warren Chiasson – vibraphone, percussion
- Donald Leight, Eddy Williams – trumpet
- Zane Paul – flute, woodwinds
- Donnie Burks, Steve Curry, Lorrie Davis, Ronald Dyson, Sally Eaton, Leata Galloway, Steve Gamet, Walter Harris, Paul Jabara, Diane Keaton, Hiram Keller, Lynn Kellogg, Jonathan Kramer, Marjorie LiPari, Emmaretta Marks, Melba Moore, Mike Moran, Natalie Mosco, Suzannah Norstrand, Shelley Plimpton, James Rado, Gerome Ragni, Robert Rubinsky, Lamont Washington – vocals

== Cover versions ==
- Nina Simone covered "Ain't Got No, I Got Life" in 1968, peaking at number 2 in the UK and at number 1 in the Netherlands. It also charted on the Billboard Hot 100, where it reached number 94.
- The 5th Dimension recorded the medley "Aquarius/Let the Sunshine In" in 1969, creating a #1 hit single.
- The Cowsills covered "Hair" in 1969, hitting #2.
- Oliver covered "Good Morning Starshine" in 1969, hitting #3.
- Strawberry Alarm Clock covered "Good Morning Starshine" in 1969, charting at #87.
- Three Dog Night covered "Easy to Be Hard" in 1969, hitting #4.
- Run–D.M.C. sampled "Where Do I Go?" in their 1993 song "Down with the King", which charted at #21 on the Hot 100.

== See also ==
- Hair (Original Off-Broadway Cast Recording)
- Hair: Original Soundtrack Recording
