= Hair (soundtrack) =

Hair: An American Tribal Love-Rock Musical

Soundtrack album
- Released: 1979
- Genre: Pop; R&B
- Length: 78:53
- Label: RCA Victor
- Producer: George R. Marck; Andy Wiswell

Hair: Original Soundtrack Recording is the soundtrack album from the 1979 musical film Hair. It was released on the RCA Victor label.

The film omits the musical's songs "The Bed", "Dead End", "Oh Great God of Power", "I Believe in Love", "Going Down", "Air", "My Conviction", "Abie Baby", "Frank Mills", and "What a Piece of Work is Man". The latter five songs were originally recorded for the film but were eventually cut. They can be found on this album, although they were omitted on the 1990 reissue.

A new song written by MacDermot for the film is "Somebody to Love". A few verses from "Manchester, England" and a small portion of "Walking in Space" have been removed. While the songs "Don't Put It Down" and "Somebody to Love" are not sung by characters in the movie, they are both used as background or instrumental music for scenes at the army base. There are several other differences from songs in the movie and as they appear on the soundtrack, mainly in omitted verses and different orchestrations.

== Soundtrack ==
All lyrics are written by Gerome Ragni, Jim Rado; all music is composed by Galt MacDermot.

Disc one
No.	Title	Length
1.	"Aquarius" (Renn Woods)	4:47
2.	"Sodomy" (Donnie Dacus)	1:30
3.	"Donna/Hashish"	4:19
4.	"Colored Spade"	1:34
5.	"Manchester" (John Savage)	1:58
6.	"Abie Baby/Fourscore" (Nell Carter)	2:43
7.	"I'm Black/Ain't Got No"	2:24
8.	"Air"	1:27
9.	"Party Music"	3:26
10.	"My Conviction"	1:46
11.	"I Got Life" (Treat Williams)	2:16
12.	"Frank Mills"	2:39
13.	"Hair"	2:43
14.	"L.B.J."	1:09
15.	"Electric Blues/Old Fashioned Melody"	3:50
16.	"Hare Krishna"	3:20

Disc two
No.	Title	Length
1.	"Where Do I Go?"	2:50
2.	"Black Boys"	1:12
3.	"White Boys" (Nell Carter)	2:36
4.	"Walking in Space (My Body)"	6:12
5.	"Easy to Be Hard" (Cheryl Barnes)	3:39
6.	"Three-Five-Zero-Zero"	3:49
7.	"Good Morning Starshine" (Beverly D'Angelo)	2:24
8.	"What a Piece of Work Is Man"	1:39
9.	"Somebody to Love"	4:10
10.	"Don't Put It Down"	2:25
11.	"The Flesh Failures/Let the Sunshine In"	6:06

== Certifications ==
Region	Certification	Certified units/sales
Netherlands (NVPI)	Gold	50,000^{^}
United States (RIAA)	Gold	500,000^{^}
^{^} Shipments figures based on certification alone.

== See also ==
- Hair (Original Off-Broadway Cast Recording)
- Hair (Original Broadway Cast Recording)
