= Love. It comes in all colors =

Anti-racism slogan in the United States

Love. It comes in all colors was an American television and print public service ad filmed in the space of one hour on Sunday afternoon, December 7, 1969, and broadcast on American TV stations during 1970. Sponsored by the National Urban Coalition, it was part of an advertising campaign to promote racial harmony and featured political activists as well as celebrities from sports, show business, government and business.

== Background ==
Produced by the advertising agency Ketchum, MacLeod & Grove and filmed at Manhattan's MPO Studios, the one-minute commercial showed an assembled group singing several repetitions for chorus to "Let The Sun Shine In" from Hair. The refrain speeds up as does the editing, trying to give everyone equal time and ends with applause by everyone. The words "Love. It comes in all colors." are then superimposed upon the screen. It was broadcast as a public service advertisement during shows such as the March 8, 1970 episode of The Ed Sullivan Show (Ed Sullivan having been one of the participants).

The performance was staged by film director Joshua Logan and musical director Mitch Miller.

Amiri Baraka, one of the 117 invitees who came for the filming, was present in the studio during the production, but refused to appear on-camera. Among the numerous notables who were sent an invitation to the filming, 28 made known their willingness to participate, but did not arrive. These included Muhammad Ali, Julian Bond, Dick Gregory, John Lindsay and Sidney Poitier.

The youngest participant was 21-year-old Miss America 1970 Pamela Anne Eldred (although some members of the cast of the musical Hair, whose birth years remain unlisted, may have been younger) and the oldest were 75-year old trade unionist Jacob Potofsky and 74-year-old boxing champion Jack Dempsey, the only participants born in the 19th century. Five of the participants died within a five-year period following the filming: Whitney Young (March 1971), Ralph Bunche (December 1971), Dan Blocker (May 1972), Roberto Clemente (December 1972) and Chet Huntley (March 1974).

== Participants ==
=== Actors ===
- Robert Alda (1914–1986)
- Eddie "Rochester" Anderson (1905–1977)
- Jim Backus (1913–1989)
- Orson Bean (1928–2020)
- Dan Blocker (1928–1972)
- David Canary (1938–2015)
- Peggy Cass (1924–1999)
- Míriam Colón (1936–2017)
- Roberto Contreras (1928–2000)
- Ossie Davis (1917–2005)
- Ruby Dee (1922–2014)
- Mildred Dunnock (1901–1991)
- Geraldine Fitzgerald (1913–2005)
- Henry Fonda (1905–1982)
- Arlene Francis (1907–2001)
- Will Geer (1902–1978)
- Joel Grey (born 1932)
- Anne Jackson (1925–2016)
- Stacy Keach (born 1941)
- Jack Klugman (1922–2012)
- Myrna Loy (1905–1993)
- Keye Luke (1904–1991)
- Doug McClure (1935–1995)
- Ali MacGraw (born 1939)
- Butterfly McQueen (1911–1995)
- Ray Martell, actor playing a small part in a 1969 episode of Mission Impossible TV series
- Dina Merrill (1923–2017)
- Greg Morris (1933–1996)
- Mildred Natwick (1905–1994)
- Leonard Nimoy (1931–2015)
- Jerry Orbach (1935–2004)
- Carl Reiner (1922–2020)
- John Russell (1921–1991)
- James Shigeta (1929–2014)
- Gwen Verdon (1925–2000)
- Eli Wallach (1915–2014)
- Flip Wilson (1933–1998)

=== Television personalities ===
- Johnny Carson (1925–2005)
- Merv Griffin (1925–2007)
- Chet Huntley (1911–1974)
- Mitch Miller (1911–2010) [also conductor of the commercial's "Let the Sun Shine" song]
- Ed Sullivan (1901–1974)
- David Susskind (1920–1987)

=== Musical performers ===
- Cannonball Adderley (1928–1975)
- Bobby Capó (1922–1989)
- Ray Charles [1930–2004)
- Leontyne Price (born 1927)

==== Cast members of Hair ====
- Obie Bray
- Lorrie (Mary) Davis
- Sally Eaton (born 1947)
- Leata Galloway
- Fluffer Hirsch
- Pat Lambert
- Cliff Lipson
- Charles O. Lynch
- Robin McNamara (1947–2021)
- Melba Moore (born 1945)
- Cassandra Morgan
- Allan Nicholls (born 1945)
- Debbie Offner
- Shelley Plimpton (born 1947)
- George Tipton (1932–2016)
- Singer Williams
- Lillian Wong

=== Miss America 1970 ===
- Pamela Anne Eldred (1948–2022)

=== Directors ===
- Joshua Logan (1908–1988) [also the commercial's stage director]
- Gordon Parks (1912–2006)

=== Sports figures ===
- Roberto Clemente (1934–1972)
- Bob Cousy (born 1928)
- Jack Dempsey (1895–1983)
- Danny Villanueva (1937–2015)

=== Public officials ===
- Joseph Hugh Allen (1940–2008)
- Joe J. Bernal (born 1927), Texas state senator
- Ralph Bunche (1904–1971)
- Lisle C. Carter (1925–2009)
- Carlos D. Conde (born 1938), public affairs director for the Inter-Agency Committee on Mexican-American Affairs
- John Conyers (1929–2019)
- Jerry Enomoto (1926–2016), first Asian American to head California Department of Corrections
- John W. Gardner (1912–2002)
- Arthur Goldberg (1908–1990)
- Richard Hatcher (1933–2019)
- Daniel Inouye (1924–2012)
- Earl Lucas (born 1938), elected mayor of Mississippi's African-American city Mound Bayou in 1969
- Joseph Monserrat (1921–2005), president of New York City Board of Education leader in Latino community

=== Business executives ===
- Frederick Close (1905–1989), Chairman of Alcoa
- Andrew Heiskell (1915–2003)
- John H. Johnson (1918–2005)
- John D. Rockefeller III (1906–1978)
- Franklin A. Thomas (1934–2021)

=== Social leaders ===
- Fernando Del Rio (born 1932), KCAL–TV reporter and director of communications for Southern California Association of Governments
- James Farmer (1920–1999)
- Herman Gallegos (born 1930), co-founder of National Council of La Raza
- Fannie Lou Hamer (1917–1977)
- Gus Heningburg (1930–2012), founding president of Greater Newark Urban Coalition and host of NBC's Positively Black
- Jacob Potofsky (1894–1979)
- Bayard Rustin (1912–1987)
- William Seneca (1927–1984), Native American leader; Seneca Nation treasurer (1966–68, 1970–71) and president (1968–70)
- Abe Tapia (born 1934), president of California's Mexican American Political Association; 1970 candidate in 45th Assembly District
- C. T. Vivian (1924–2020)
- Roy Wilkins (1901–1981)
- Whitney Young (1921–1971)

=== Writers ===
- Cleveland Amory (1917–1998)
- Amiri Baraka (1934–2014) [was present during the filming, but refused to appear on-camera]
- Topper Carew (born 1943), television writer, producer and director (Martin)
- Harry Golden (1902–1981)
- Bill Hosokawa (1915–2007)
- Harry Kitano (1926–2002), scholar, musician and author
