= Hair (Original Off-Broadway Cast Recording) =

Hair: An American Tribal Love-Rock Musical

Cast recording
- Released: 1967
- Recorded: October 30, 1967
- Genre: Pop, R&B
- Length: 46:57
- Label: RCA Victor
- Producer: George R.Marck, Andy Wiswell

Hair is the cast recording of the original, Off-Broadway cast of the musical Hair: An American Tribal Love-Rock Musical. It was released in 1967 by RCA Victor. Hair premiered Off-Broadway at the Public Theater on October 17, 1967, and the cast album was recorded two weeks later. The lead roles were played by Walker Daniels as Claude, Gerome Ragni as Berger, Jill O'Hara as Sheila, Steve Dean as Woof, Arnold Wilkerson as Hud, Sally Eaton as Jeanie and Shelley Plimpton as Crissy.

In the Off-Broadway version of Hair, the lead role of Claude had been written as a space alien who aspires to be a cinematic director. This was changed for the Broadway production. This Off-Broadway recording includes the songs "Exanaplanetooch" and "Climax," which were cut from the Broadway production. The reviewer for Allmusic.com criticized Ragni's and Eaton's vocals but praised Plimpton. When it was released on CD as a bonus disc of the Broadway album, it also included three songs that were in the show, but not on the original LP: "Opening", "Red Blue And White" (the future "Don't Put It Down") and the finale "Sentimental Ending", plus an interview with composer Galt MacDermot.

== Track listing ==
Music by Galt MacDermot and lyrics by Gerome Ragni and James Rado:

1. "Aint Got No" 3:04
2. "I Got Life" 3:27
3. "Air" 3:33
4. "Going Down" 2:34
5. "Hair" 3:23
6. "Dead End" 2:59
7. "Frank Mills" 4:23
8. "Hare Krishna" 4:29
9. "Where Do I Go" 2:52
10. "Electric Blues" 2:41
11. "Easy to Be Hard" 2:41
12. "Manchester" 2:41
13. "White Boys" 2:41
14. "Black Boys" 2:41
15. "Walking In Space" 2:41
16. "Aquarius" 2:41
17. "Good Morning Starshine" 2:41
18. "Exanaplanetooch" 2:41
19. "The Climax" 2:41

== See also ==
- Hair (Original Broadway Cast Recording)
- The Public Theater
- Cheetah nightclub
- Hair: Original Soundtrack Recording
