= List of Record World number-one albums of 1969 =

These are the Record World number-one albums of 1969.

== Chart ==
Issue date	Album	Artist(s)	Label
January 4	The Beatles (The White Album)	The Beatles	Apple
January 11	The Beatles (The White Album)	The Beatles	Apple
January 18	The Beatles (The White Album)	The Beatles	Apple
January 25	The Beatles (The White Album)	The Beatles	Apple
February 1	The Beatles (The White Album)	The Beatles	Apple
February 8	The Beatles (The White Album)	The Beatles	Apple
February 15	The Beatles (The White Album)	The Beatles	Apple
February 22	The Beatles (The White Album)	The Beatles	Apple
March 1	The Beatles (The White Album)	The Beatles	Apple
March 8	The Beatles (The White Album)	The Beatles	Apple
March 15	The Beatles (The White Album)	The Beatles	Apple
March 22	Ball	Iron Butterfly	
March 29	Blood, Sweat & Tears	Blood, Sweat & Tears	Columbia
April 5	Blood, Sweat & Tears	Blood, Sweat & Tears	Columbia
April 12	Hair	Original Cast	RCA Victor
April 19	Hair	Original Cast	RCA Victor
April 26	Hair	Original Cast	RCA Victor
May 3	Hair	Original Cast	RCA Victor
May 10	Hair	Original Cast	RCA Victor
May 17	Hair	Original Cast	RCA Victor
May 24	Hair	Original Cast	RCA Victor
May 31	Nashville Skyline	Bob Dylan	
June 7	Nashville Skyline	Bob Dylan	
June 14	Nashville Skyline	Bob Dylan	
June 21	Hair	Original Cast	RCA Victor
June 28	Hair	Original Cast	RCA Victor
July 5	Hair	Original Cast	RCA Victor
July 12	Hair	Original Cast	RCA Victor
July 19	Hair	Original Cast	RCA Victor
July 26	Hair	Original Cast	RCA Victor
August 2	Tommy	The Who	
August 9	Tommy	The Who	
August 16	Tommy	The Who	
August 23	Romeo & Juliet	Soundtrack	Columbia
August 30	Johnny Cash At San Quentin	Johnny Cash	Columbia
September 6	Blind Faith	Blind Faith	Atco
September 13	Blind Faith	Blind Faith	Atco
September 20	Blind Faith	Blind Faith	Atco
September 27	Blind Faith	Blind Faith	Atco
October 4	Blind Faith	Blind Faith	Atco
October 11	Green River	Creedence Clearwater Revival	Fantasy
October 18	Green River	Creedence Clearwater Revival	Fantasy
October 25	Green River	Creedence Clearwater Revival	Fantasy
November 1	Abbey Road	The Beatles	Apple
November 8	Abbey Road	The Beatles	Apple
November 15	Abbey Road	The Beatles	Apple
November 22	Abbey Road	The Beatles	Apple
November 29	Abbey Road	The Beatles	Apple
December 6	Abbey Road	The Beatles	Apple
December 13	Abbey Road	The Beatles	Apple
December 20	Abbey Road	The Beatles	Apple
December 27	Abbey Road	The Beatles	Apple
