= Hair (film) =

1979 film directed by Miloš Forman

- Original release poster
- Directed by: Miloš Forman
- Screenplay by: Michael Weller
- Based on: Hair: The American Tribal Love-Rock Musical by: Gerome Ragni; James Rado
- Produced by: Lester Persky; Michael Butler
- Starring: John Savage; Treat Williams; Beverly D'Angelo; Annie Golden; Dorsey Wright; Don Dacus; Cheryl Barnes; Melba Moore; Ronnie Dyson
- Cinematography: Miroslav Ondříček
- Edited by: Alan Heim; Stanley Warnow
- Music by: Galt MacDermot
- Production companies: CIP Filmproduktion GmbH; Tribe Entertainment Group
- Distributed by: United Artists
- Release dates: March 14, 1979 (United States); July 12, 1979 (West Germany)
- Running time: 121 minutes
- Countries: United States; West Germany
- Language: English
- Budget: $11 million
- Box office: $38.3 million

Hair is a 1979 musical anti-war comedy-drama film directed by Miloš Forman and adapted for the screen by Michael Weller, based on the 1968 Broadway musical Hair: The American Tribal Love-Rock Musical. Set against the backdrop of the hippie counterculture of the Vietnam era, the film focuses on a Vietnam War draftee who meets and befriends a "tribe" of hippies while en route to the army induction center. The hippies and their leader introduce him to marijuana, LSD, and their environment of unorthodox relationships and draft evasion.

The film stars an ensemble cast including John Savage, Treat Williams, Beverly D'Angelo, Annie Golden, Dorsey Wright, Don Dacus, Cheryl Barnes and Ronnie Dyson. Dance scenes were choreographed by Twyla Tharp and were performed by Tharp's dancers. Hair was nominated for two Golden Globes: Best Motion Picture – Musical or Comedy, and New Star of the Year in a Motion Picture (for Williams).

== Plot ==
Claude Hooper Bukowski sets off from Oklahoma to New York City, where he is being drafted into the Army. Before his draft board appointment, Claude explores New York, where he encounters a close-knit "tribe" of hippies led by George Berger. He observes the hippies panhandle from a trio of horseback riders, including Short Hills, New Jersey debutante Sheila Franklin. He later catches and mounts a runaway horse (which the hippies have rented), exhibiting his riding skills to Sheila ("Donna"). Claude returns the horse to Berger, who offers to show him around.

That evening, Claude gets stoned on marijuana with Berger and the tribe. He is then introduced to various race and class issues of the 1960s ("Hashish", "Colored Spade", "Manchester", "I'm Black/Ain't Got No"). The next morning, Berger finds a newspaper clipping that gives Sheila's home address. The tribe members — LaFayette "Hud" Johnson, Jeannie Ryan (who is pregnant), and "Woof Dachshund" —crash a debutante party purportedly so that Claude can meet Sheila before he gets drafted. Sheila secretly enjoys her rigid environment being disrupted ("I Got Life"). After the hippies are arrested for trespassing, Claude uses his last $50 to bail Berger out of jail, where Woof resists having his hair cut ("Hair"). When Sheila is unable to borrow any money from her father so that Berger can get the other members of the group out of jail, Berger returns to his parents' home, where his mom gives him enough cash to bail out his friends.

They subsequently attend a peace rally in Central Park, where Claude drops acid for the first time ("Initials", "Electric Blues/Old Fashioned Melody", "Be-In"). Just as Jeannie proposes marriage to Claude, explaining to him that marrying her will exempt him from the draft, Sheila arrives to apologize. Claude's "trip" reflects his inner conflict over which of three worlds he fits in with: his native Oklahoman farm culture, Sheila's upper-class society, or the hippies' free-wheeling environment.

Following his "trip", Claude falls out with Berger and the tribe members, ostensibly due to a practical joke on Sheila (taking her clothes while she's skinnydipping, compelling her to hail a taxi in just her panties), but also due to their philosophical differences over the war in Vietnam and over personal versus communal responsibility. After wandering the city ("Where Do I Go?"), Claude finally reports to the draft board (“Black Boys/White Boys”), completes his enlistment, and is shipped off to Nevada for basic training.

It's now winter when Claude writes to Sheila ("Walking in Space"), who subsequently shares the news with the others. Berger devises a scheme to visit Claude. Meanwhile, Hud's fiancée — with whom he has a son, LaFayette Jr. — wants to marry as they had planned earlier ("Easy to Be Hard"). The tribe members trick Sheila's brother Steve out of his car, then head west to visit Claude.

The hippies arrive in Nevada where Claude is stationed ("Three-Five-Zero-Zero", "Good Morning Starshine"), only to be turned away, ostensibly because the base is on alert, but also because the surly MP on duty does not care for their looks. Sheila proceeds to chat up army sergeant Fenton at a local bar, luring him to an isolated desert road where the hippies acquire his uniform and car. Berger cuts his hair and dons the uniform, then drives onto the Army base. He finds Claude and offers to switch places with him for the next headcount, so that Claude can meet Sheila and the others for a farewell picnic in the desert.

Just after a disguised Claude slips away to the picnic, the base becomes fully activated with immediate ship-outs for Vietnam. Berger's ruse is not discovered, and he is herded onto a plane with the rest of Claude's company. Claude returns to the empty barracks and frantically pursues Berger's plane, but is unable to reach it before it takes off for Southeast Asia ("The Flesh Failures").

Months pass. Claude and Sheila—along with the rest of the tribe—gather at Berger's grave in Arlington National Cemetery; the grave marker verifies that Berger was KIA in Vietnam ("Let the Sunshine In"). The film ends showing a mass peace protest in Washington, D.C.

== Cast ==
- John Savage as Claude Hooper Bukowski
- Treat Williams as George Berger
- Beverly D'Angelo as Sheila Franklin
- Annie Golden as Jeannie Ryan
- Dorsey Wright as LaFayette "Hud" Johnson
- Donnie Dacus as Woof Dachshund
- Nell Carter as Central Park singer ("Ain't Got No" and "White Boys")
- Cheryl Barnes as Hud's fiancée
- Richard Bright as Sergeant Fenton
- Ellen Foley as Black Boys lead singer
- Miles Chapin as Steve, Sheila’s brother
- Charlotte Rae as Lady in Pink
- Laurie Beechman as Black Boys singer
- Nicholas Ray as the General
- Antonia Rey as Berger's Mother
- George J. Manos as Berger's Father
- Michael Jeter as Woodrow Sheldon
- Ren Woods as The Girl with Flowers ("Aquarius")

== Production ==
The film was shot in October 1977. Filming locations included a number of well-known spots in New York City, including Central Park's Bethesda Fountain, Sheep Meadow, and the Naumburg Bandshell; and Washington Square Park. Scenes were also shot at the Fort Irwin National Training Center, in the Mojave Desert in northern San Bernardino County, California, and in Barstow, California; as well as in Washington, D.C., at the Lincoln Memorial, in the National Mall.

== Soundtrack ==
All lyrics are written by Gerome Ragni, James Rado; all music is composed by Galt MacDermot.

Disc one
No.	Title	Length
1.	"Aquarius" (Renn Woods)	4:47
2.	"Sodomy" (Don Dacus)	1:30
3.	"Donna/Hashish" (Treat Williams)	4:19
4.	"Colored Spade" (Dorsey Wright)	1:34
5.	"Manchester" (John Savage)	1:58
6.	"Abie Baby/Fourscore" (Nell Carter)	2:43
7.	"I'm Black/Ain't Got No"	2:24
8.	"Air"	1:27
9.	"Party Music"	3:26
10.	"My Conviction"	1:46
11.	"I Got Life" (Treat Williams)	2:16
12.	"Frank Mills"	2:39
13.	"Hair"	2:43
14.	"Initials"	1:09
15.	"Electric Blues/Old Fashioned Melody"	3:50
16.	"Be In"	3:20

Disc two
No.	Title	Length
1.	"Where Do I Go?" (John Savage)	2:50
2.	"Black Boys" (Ellen Foley)	1:12
3.	"White Boys" (Nell Carter)	2:36
4.	"Walking in Space (My Body)"	6:12
5.	"Easy to Be Hard" (Cheryl Barnes)	3:39
6.	"Three-Five-Zero-Zero" (Ronnie Dyson & Melba Moore)	3:49
7.	"Good Morning Starshine" (Beverly D'Angelo)	2:24
8.	"What a Piece of Work is Man"	1:39
9.	"Somebody to Love"	4:10
10.	"Don't Put It Down"	2:25
11.	"The Flesh Failures/Let the Sunshine In"	6:06

- The songs "The Bed", "Dead End", "Oh Great God of Power", "I Believe in Love", "Going Down", "Air", "My Conviction", "Abie Baby", "Frank Mills", and "What a Piece of Work is Man" were omitted. The latter five, even though recorded for the film, were eventually cut, as they slowed the film's pace. These songs are included on the motion picture soundtrack album.
- A few verses from the songs "Manchester, England" and a small portion of "Walking in Space" were removed.
- While the songs "Don't Put It Down" and "Somebody to Love" are not sung by characters in the film, they are both used as background or instrumental music for scenes at the army base. The latter was a new song written by MacDermot for the film.
- Several other differences from songs in the movie appear on the soundtrack, mainly in omitted verses and different orchestrations. One notable difference is that the Broadway version used only a jazz combo while the movie soundtrack use orchestrations that make ample use of full horn and string sections. Many of the songs have been shortened, sped-up, rearranged, or assigned to different characters to allow for the differences in plot.

Ronnie Dyson and Melba Moore, both from the Broadway version of Hair, both sing on "Three Five Zero Zero".

=== Charts ===
Chart (1979)	Position
Australia (Kent Music Report)	49

== Differences from the musical ==
As the film's plot and soundtrack differ greatly from the original musical, Gerome Ragni and James Rado, who wrote the stage show with composer Galt MacDermot, were unhappy with the film adaptation. They felt it failed to capture the essence of Hair in that hippies were portrayed as "oddballs" and "some sort of aberration" without any connection to the peace movement. Ragni and Rado stated, "Any resemblance between the 1979 film and the original Biltmore version, other than some of the songs, the names of the characters, and a common title, eludes us." In their view, the screen version of Hair had not yet been produced.

- In the musical, Claude is a member of a hippie "Tribe", sharing a New York City apartment, leading a bohemian lifestyle, enjoying "free love", and rebelling against both his parents and the draft. Eventually, however, he goes to Vietnam.
  - In the film, Claude is rewritten as an innocent draftee from Oklahoma, newly arrived in New York City to join the military. In New York, he gets caught up with the group of hippies while awaiting deployment to Army training camp. They introduce Claude to their psychedelically-inspired style of living; eventually, the Tribe drives out to Nevada with the intention of visiting Claude at training camp.
- In the musical, Sheila is an outspoken feminist leader of the Tribe who loves Berger as well as Claude.
  - In the film, Sheila is a high-society debutante who catches Claude's eye.
- In the film, Berger is not only the Tribe's de facto leader, but is assigned some of Claude's conflict involving whether or not to obey the draft. A major plot change from the musical results in Berger being accidentally sent to Vietnam (despite having had no military training or indoctrination), in Claude's place. Soon thereafter, Berger is killed in action.
- The musical focuses on the U.S. peace movement, as well as the love relationships among the Tribe members.
  - The film, however, focuses on the carefree antics of the hippies.

== Release ==
Hair was shown out of competition at the 1979 Cannes Film Festival. The film premiered at the Ziegfeld Theatre in New York City on March 12, 1979.

== Reception ==
=== Box office ===
The film earned $15.3 million in the United States and Canada. By the end of 1979, it had grossed $38,290,492 worldwide.

=== Critical response ===
Hair received generally favorable reviews from critics at the time of release; it currently holds an 82% "fresh" rating on review aggregate website Rotten Tomatoes from 60 reviews. The critical consensus reads, "Spiritedly performed by a groovy cast and imaginatively directed by Milos Forman, Hair transports audiences straight to the Age of Aquarius." Metacritic, which uses a weighted average, assigned the film a score of 68 out of 100, based on 7 critics, indicating "generally favorable" reviews.

For The New York Times, Vincent Canby called it "a rollicking musical memoir.... [Michael] Weller's inventions make this Hair seem much funnier than I remember the show's having been. They also provide time and space for the development of characters who, on the stage, had to express themselves almost entirely in song.... The entire cast is superb.... Mostly... the film is a delight." Frank Rich said: "If ever a project looked doomed, it was this one" (referring to the "largely plotless" and dated musical upon which it was based, Forman's and Tharp's lack of movie musical experience, the "largely unproven cast" and the film's "grand budget"); but that in spite of these obstacles, "Hair succeeds at all levels—as lowdown fun, as affecting drama, as exhilarating spectacle and as provocative social observation. It achieves its goals by rigorously obeying the rules of classic American musical comedy: dialogue, plot, song and dance blend seamlessly to create a juggernaut of excitement. Though every cut and camera angle in Hair appears to have been carefully conceived, the total effect is spontaneous. Like the best movie musicals of the '50s (Singin' in the Rain) and the '60s (A Hard Day's Night), Hair leaps from one number to the next. Soon the audience is leaping too."

=== Awards and honors ===
At the 37th Golden Globe Awards, Hair was nominated for a Best Motion Picture – Musical or Comedy, and Williams was nominated for New Star of the Year in a Motion Picture – Male. The film was also nominated for Best Foreign Film at the 1980 César Awards, losing to Woody Allen's Manhattan (which was also released by United Artists).

Years later, Forman cited his loss of his moral rights to the film to the studio as eventually leading to his 1997 John Huston Award for Artists Rights from the Film Foundation:

What was behind that [award] was that one day I had in my contract that when the studio wants to sell Hair ...to the network but they have to have my, you know, consent or how would they...what they do with it. But I didn't have this, so what they did, they didn't sell it to the network, they sold it to syndicated television where I didn't have that right. What happened: the film played on 115 syndicated stations practically all over the United States, and it's a musical. Out of 22 musical numbers, 11 musical numbers were cut out from the film, and yet it was still presented as a Milos Forman film, Hair. It was totally incomprehensible, gibberish, butchered beyond belief...

The New York Times placed the film on its Best 1000 Movies Ever list.

The film is recognized by American Film Institute in these lists:

- 2004: AFI's 100 Years...100 Songs:
  - "Aquarius" – #33
- 2006: AFI's Greatest Movie Musicals – Nominated

== Home media ==
Hair was released on VHS by 20th Century Fox Video in 1982 with later VHS releases from MGM/UA Home Video (distributed by Warner Home Video). The film was released on DVD by MGM Home Entertainment on April 27, 1999, as a Region 1 widescreen DVD, and on Blu-ray on June 7, 2011.
