= Wichita Vortex Sutra =

1966 anti-war poem by Allen Ginsberg

"Wichita Vortex Sutra" is an anti-war poem by Allen Ginsberg, written in 1966. It appears in his collection Planet News and has also been published in Collected Poems 1947-1995 and Collected Poems 1947-1980. The poem presents Ginsberg as speaker, focusing on his condemnation of the Vietnam War. It features imagery of the war and America's Heartland interspersed with news reports and cultural references. It is also written in Ginsberg's distinctive Whitman-like long-prose style.

== Description ==
The poem originated as a voice recording that Ginsberg made with an Uher tape recorder while traveling across the Midwest. He composed it spontaneously, dictating the words into the recorder as they came to him. In transcribing the poem, Ginsberg arranged the lines by the natural pauses and dictation in his recordings, according to the "organic space-timing" that they provided.

Throughout the poem, Ginsberg contrasts images of the Midwest (and, in particular, the Kansan landscape) with snippets of news reports about the war, linking its violence with the political conservatism of the Heartland. He decries Carrie Nation's work in Wichita, Kansas as beginning "a vortex of hatred that defoliated the Mekong Delta." The poem also uses images highlighting the sensuality and intimacy of the human body to humanize the violence of the war. Such images are found elsewhere in Ginsberg's work.

The title reflects Ginsberg's interest in Eastern religions as well. In Buddhism, "sutra" often refers to canonical scriptures, many of which are regarded as records of the oral teachings of the Buddha. Ginsberg also references religious figures, including Christ, Allah, and Yahweh, in addition to various Indian holy men.

A prominent theme running through the poem is the proliferation and power of language. As Rolf Potts wrote in The Nation, Ginsberg aimed to "reclaim language for its higher purposes," and that the poem is ultimately "an elegy for the power of language in an age of competing information." In his book Out of the Vietnam Vortex: A Study of Poets and Poetry Against the War, James F. Mersmann writes that "a chief virtue of [the poem] is that it makes the reader experience the proliferation and abuse of language ... and in doing so, makes one painfully aware that in every case language is not to communicate truth but to manipulate the hearer."

== In culture ==
Phrases from the poem are used in the song "Three-Five-Zero-Zero" from the 1967 rock musical Hair.

Music was written in 1988 by Philip Glass to accompany Ginsberg's performance of the poem, and was included in Solo Piano and his chamber opera Hydrogen Jukebox, as well as Sally Whitwell's Mad Rush: Solo Piano Music of Philip Glass.

A long section is quoted (in heavily French-accented English) in the French film Cold Water (L'eau froide) (1994).

Artemis Records released a live recording of the poem on CD in 2004.

In January 2010, Glass's cousin Ira performed the poem with Glass's live accompaniment at the SoHo Apple store in New York City.

The poem was used in Ang Lee's 2016 film Billy Lynn's Long Halftime Walk, which focuses on a group of soldiers who take a short leave home after a winning battle in Iraq.
