= Glen and Randa =

- Theatrical poster
- Directed by: Jim McBride
- Written by: Lorenzo Mans; Rudy Wurlitzer; Jim McBride
- Produced by: Sidney Glazier
- Starring: Steve Curry; Shelley Plimpton; Woody Chambliss; Garry Goodrow
- Cinematography: Alan Raymond
- Edited by: Jack Baran; Mike Levine
- Distributed by: Universal Marion Corporation (UMC)
- Release date: 1971
- Running time: 93 minutes
- Country: United States
- Language: English
- Budget: $480,000

Glen and Randa is a 1971 American post-apocalyptic science fiction drama film directed by Jim McBride. It was co-written by McBride, Lorenzo Mans and Rudy Wurlitzer. McBride made the film for $480,000 with an obscure cast including Steve Curry, Shelley Plimpton, Woodrow Chambliss and Gary Goodrow.

== Synopsis ==
Decades after a nuclear war has devastated the Earth and left the survivors as scavengers, a young couple named Glen and Randa, who come from a close knit tribe in a rural area, set out to discover the remains of the world that came before them. They know nothing of the outside world, except that Glen has read about and seen pictures of a great city in some old comic books and he and Randa set out to find this city.

== Cast ==
- Steve Curry as Glen (as Steven Curry)
- Shelley Plimpton as Randa
- Woodrow Chambliss as Sidney Miller
- Garry Goodrow as Magician

== Reception ==
The movie received generally favorable reviews. Time magazine rated the movie one of the top 10 of 1971 and stated, “'Glen and Randa' is one of the best and most original American films of the year". Time magazine also wrote, "there is no disputing his distinctive cinematic flair or the definitive excellence of his relatively unknown actors". The New York Times stated, "'Glen and Randa' is neither a successful nor an entertaining movie, but it is sober, and what mind it has is high. Thus I'm completely mystified by the X rating that has been attached to it, apparently because of its nudity and love-making. They might be thought obscene only by stretching a censor's imagination."

== See also ==
- List of American films of 1971
