= Solo Piano (Philip Glass album) =

Studio album by Philip Glass
- Released: 1989
- Genre: Minimalism
- Length: 51:18
- Label: CBS Records

Professional ratings
Review scores
Source	Rating
AllMusic	3/5 stars
Pitchfork	9.2/10

Solo Piano (1989) is an album of piano music composed and performed by Philip Glass. It was produced by Kurt Munkacsi.

The title of five of the seven movements, "Metamorphosis", refers to and was inspired by the 1915 novella The Metamorphosis by Franz Kafka. While all pieces were written in 1988, some were written for a staging of Metamorphosis, while others were for the 1988 documentary film The Thin Blue Line directed by Errol Morris. "Mad Rush" was written in 1979 and is based on an earlier organ piece; it has been used by choreographers Lucinda Childs and Benjamin Millepied. The title of the last composition is a reference to Allen Ginsberg's 1966 poem "Wichita Vortex Sutra", and was composed, in collaboration with Ginsberg, for both a reading and recording of the poem.

"Metamorphosis One" is played in an episode of Battlestar Galactica by Kara "Starbuck" Thrace. Within the narrative, her father composed and performed the piece. It is also played in the series finale of Person of Interest, Return 0. "Metamorphosis Two" formed the basis of one of the main musical themes in the film The Hours. It is also the song that the American rock band Pearl Jam uses as their introduction music to concerts. Many pianists have recorded this music subsequently, notably Bruce Brubaker, Sally Whitwell, Lisa Moore, and Valentina Lisitsa.

== Track listing ==
All tracks composed and arranged by Philip Glass.

1. "Metamorphosis One" – 5:41
2. "Metamorphosis Two" – 7:22
3. "Metamorphosis Three" – 5:33
4. "Metamorphosis Four" – 7:01
5. "Metamorphosis Five" – 5:10
6. "Mad Rush" – 13:48
7. "Wichita Vortex Sutra" – 6:53
