= Hair (musical) =

1960s counterculture rock musical

- The American Tribal Love-Rock Musical
- Original Broadway poster
- Music: Galt MacDermot
- Lyrics: Gerome Ragni; James Rado
- Book: Gerome Ragni; James Rado
- Productions: 1967 Off-Broadway; 1968 Broadway; 1968 West End; 1977 Broadway revival; 2009 Broadway revival; 2010 West End revival; 2019 UK Tour
- Awards: Tony Award for Best Revival of a Musical

Hair: The American Tribal Love-Rock Musical is a rock musical with a book and lyrics by Gerome Ragni and James Rado and music by Galt MacDermot. The work reflects the creators' observations of the hippie counterculture and sexual revolution of the late 1960s, and several of its songs became anthems of the anti-Vietnam War movement. The musical's profanity, its depiction of the use of illegal drugs, its treatment of sexuality, its irreverence for the American flag, and its nude scene caused controversy. The work broke new ground in musical theatre by defining the genre of "rock musical", using a racially integrated cast, and inviting the audience onstage for a "Be-In" finale.

Hair tells the story of the "tribe", a group of politically active, long-haired hippies of the "Age of Aquarius" living a bohemian life in New York City and fighting against conscription into the Vietnam War. Claude, his friend Berger, their roommate Sheila and their friends struggle to balance their young lives, loves and the sexual revolution with their rebellion against the war and their conservative parents and society. Ultimately, Claude must decide whether to resist the draft, as his friends have done, or serve in Vietnam, compromising his pacifist principles and risking his life.

After an off-Broadway debut on October 17, 1967, at Joseph Papp's Public Theater, and a run at the Cheetah nightclub from December 1967 through January 1968, the show opened on Broadway in April 1968 and ran for 1,750 performances. Simultaneous productions in cities across the United States and Europe followed shortly thereafter, including a London production that ran for 1,997 performances. Since then, productions have been staged around the world, spawning dozens of recordings, including the 3 million-selling original Broadway cast recording. Some of the songs became Top 10 hits, and a feature film adaptation was released in 1979. A Broadway revival opened in 2009, earning strong reviews and winning the Tony Award and Drama Desk Award for Best Revival of a Musical. In 2008, Richard Zoglin wrote in Time that "Today Hair seems, if anything, more daring than ever."

== History ==
Actors James Rado and Gerome Ragni began writing Hair together in late 1964. The main characters were autobiographical, with Rado's Claude a pensive romantic and Ragni's Berger an extrovert. Their close relationship, including its volatility, was reflected in the musical. Rado said, "We were great friends. It was a passionate kind of relationship that we directed into creativity, into writing, into creating this piece. We put the drama between us on stage."

Rado described the inspiration for Hair as "a combination of some characters we met in the streets, people we knew and our own imaginations. We knew this group of kids in the East Village who were dropping out and dodging the draft, and there were also lots of articles in the press about how kids were being kicked out of school for growing their hair long". He recalled, "There was so much excitement in the streets and the parks and the hippie areas, and we thought if we could transmit this excitement to the stage it would be wonderful. ... We hung out with them and went to their Be-Ins [and] let our hair grow." Many cast members (Shelley Plimpton in particular) were recruited off the street. Rado said, "It was very important historically, and if we hadn't written it, there'd not be any examples. You could read about it and see film clips, but you'd never experience it. We thought, 'This is happening in the streets', and we wanted to bring it to the stage." According to Rado's obituary in The New York Times, the title was inspired by "a painting of a tuft of hair by the Pop artist Jim Dine. Its title was Hair."

Rado and Ragni came from different artistic backgrounds. In college, Rado wrote musical revues and aspired to be a Broadway composer in the Rodgers and Hammerstein tradition. He went on to study acting with Lee Strasberg. Ragni was a member of The Open Theater, one of several groups that were developing experimental theatre techniques, including non-traditional theater roles, blurring the lines between playwright, director and actor. By 1967, theaters such as The Living Theatre, La MaMa Experimental Theatre Club and The Open Theatre were devising plays from improvisational scenes crafted in the rehearsal space rather than following a traditional script. Ragni introduced Rado to the modern theatre styles and methods being developed at The Open Theater. In 1966, while the two were developing Hair, Ragni performed in The Open Theater's production of Megan Terry's play Viet Rock, about young men being deployed to the Vietnam War. Viet Rock employed the improvisational exercises being used in experimental theatre. Scenes were connected in "prelogical ways": a scene could be built from a tangent from the previous scene, in counterpoint to it, or connected psychologically. Actors switched roles in the middle of a show, in mid-scene, or played actors. Terry wrote, "The ... transformations should be abrupt and total." Hair was designed in much the same way; the actors play different characters throughout the piece, and, as in Claude's psychedelic trip in Act 2, sometimes during the same scene. As in Viet Rock, the actors frequently break the "fourth wall" to interact with the audience.

Rado and Ragni brought their drafts of the show to producer Eric Blau who, through common friend Nat Shapiro, connected the two with Canadian composer Galt MacDermot. MacDermot had already won two Grammy Awards for Best Instrumental Composition and Best Original Jazz Composition in 1961 for his "African Waltz" (recorded by Cannonball Adderley). The composer's lifestyle was in marked contrast to his co-creators: "I had short hair, a wife, and, at that point, four children, and I lived on Staten Island." "I never even heard of a hippie." But he shared their enthusiasm to do a rock and roll show. "We work independently", MacDermot said in May 1968. "I prefer it that way. They hand me the material. I set it to music." MacDermot wrote the first score in three weeks, starting with "I Got Life", "Ain't Got No", "Where Do I Go" and the title song. He first wrote "Aquarius" as an unconventional art piece, but later rewrote it as an uplifting anthem.

=== Off-Broadway productions ===
The creators pitched the show to Broadway producers and received many rejections. Eventually Joe Papp, who ran the New York Shakespeare Festival, decided he wanted Hair to open the new Public Theater (still under construction) in New York City's East Village. Hair was the first work by living authors that Papp produced. The director, Gerald Freedman, the theater's associate artistic director, decided that Rado, at 35, was too old to play Claude, although he agreed to cast the 32-year-old Ragni as Berger. The production did not go smoothly:

The rehearsal and casting process was confused, the material itself incomprehensible to many of the theater's staff. [Freedman] withdrew in frustration during the final week of rehearsals and offered his resignation. Papp accepted it, and the choreographer Anna Sokolow took over the show. ... After a disastrous final dress rehearsal, Papp wired Mr. Freedman in Washington, where he'd fled: "Please come back." Mr. Freedman did.

Hair premiered off-Broadway at the Public on October 17, 1967, and ran for six weeks. The lead roles were played by Walker Daniels as Claude, Ragni as Berger, Jill O'Hara as Sheila, Steve Dean as Woof, Arnold Wilkerson as Hud, Sally Eaton as Jeanie and Shelley Plimpton as Crissy. Set design was by Ming Cho Lee, costume design by Theoni Aldredge, and, although Anna Sokolow began rehearsals as choreographer, Freedman received choreographer credit. The production had a "tepid critical reception" but was popular with audiences. A cast album was released in 1967.

Chicago businessman Michael Butler was planning to run for the U.S. Senate on an antiwar platform. After seeing an ad for Hair in The New York Times that led him to believe the show was about Native Americans, he watched the Public's production several times and joined forces with Papp to reproduce the show at another New York venue after it closed at the Public. Papp and Butler first moved the show to The Cheetah discothèque in midtown, where it opened on December 22, 1967, and ran for 45 performances. There was no nudity in either the Public Theater or Cheetah production.

=== Revision for Broadway ===
Hair underwent a thorough overhaul between its closing at the Cheetah in January 1968 and its Broadway opening three months later. The off-Broadway book, already light on plot, was loosened even further and made more realistic. Thirteen new songs were added, including "Let the Sun Shine In", to make the ending more uplifting.

Before the move to Broadway, the creative team hired director Tom O'Horgan, who had built a reputation directing experimental theater at La MaMa E.T.C. He had been the authors' first choice to direct the Public Theater production, but he was in Europe at the time. Newsweek called O'Horgan's directing style "sensual, savage, and thoroughly musical ... [he] disintegrates verbal structure and often breaks up and distributes narrative and even character among different actors. ... He enjoys sensory bombardment." O'Horgan and the writers rearranged scenes to increase the experimental aspects. In rehearsals, O'Horgan used techniques passed down by Viola Spolin and Paul Sills involving role playing and improvisational "games", many of which were incorporated into the Broadway script. O'Horgan and new choreographer Julie Arenal encouraged freedom and spontaneity in their actors, introducing "an organic, expansive style of staging" that had never been seen before on Broadway. The inspiration to include nudity came when the authors saw an antiwar demonstration in Central Park in which two men stripped naked as an expression of defiance and freedom. O'Horgan had used nudity in many of the plays he directed, and he helped integrate the idea into the fabric of the show.

Papp declined to pursue a Broadway production, so Butler produced the show himself. For a time it seemed that he would be unable to secure a Broadway theater, as the Shuberts, Nederlanders and other theater owners deemed the material too controversial. But Butler had family connections and knew important people; he persuaded Biltmore Theatre owner David Cogan to make his venue available. The stage design was completely open, with no curtain and the fly area and grid exposed to the audience. The proscenium arch was outlined with climb-ready scaffolding. The spare set was painted in shades of grey, with street graffiti stenciled on the stage. The stage was raked, and a tower of abstract scaffolding upstage at the rear merged a Native American totem pole and a modern sculpture of a crucifix-shaped tree. This scaffolding was decorated with found objects that the cast gathered from New York's streets, including a life-size papier-mâché bus driver, a head of Jesus and a neon marquee of the Waverly movie theater in Greenwich Village. The costumes were based on hippie street clothes, made more theatrical with enhanced color and texture. Some of these included mixed parts of military uniforms, bell-bottom jeans with Ukrainian embroidery, tie dyed T-shirts and a red, white and blue fringed coat.

== Synopsis ==
=== Act I ===
Claude sits center stage as the "tribe" mingles with the audience. Tribe members Sheila, a New York University student and political activist, and Berger, an irreverent free spirit, cut a lock of Claude's hair and burn it. After the tribe converges in slow motion toward the stage, they begin their celebration as children of the Age of Aquarius ("Aquarius"). Berger removes his trousers to reveal a loincloth. Interacting with the audience, he introduces himself as a "psychedelic teddy bear ... looking for my Donna" ("Donna").

The tribe recites a list of pharmaceuticals, legal and illegal ("Hashish"). Woof, a gentle soul, extols sexual practices ("Sodomy"). He loves plants, his family and the audience, telling the audience, "We are all one." Hud, a militant African-American, is carried in upside-down on a pole. He declares himself "president of the United States of Love" ("Colored Spade"). In a fake English accent, Claude says that he is "the most beautiful beast in the forest" from "Manchester, England". A tribe member reminds him that he is from Flushing, New York ("Manchester England"). Hud, Woof and Berger declare their color ("I'm Black"), while Claude counters that he is "invisible". The tribe rattles off a list of things they lack ("Ain't Got No"). African-American tribe members list street signs in symbolic sequence ("Dead End"). Sheila is carried onstage ("I Believe in Love") and leads the tribe in a protest chant. Jeanie, an eccentric young woman, appears wearing a gas mask because of pollution ("Air"). She is pregnant and in love with Claude, wishing it was Claude's baby, as she was "knocked up by some crazy speed freak". The tribe link LBJ, FBI, CIA and LSD ("Initials"). Members of the tribe appear dressed as Claude's parents, berating him for transgressions: he has no job and collects "mountains of paper" clippings and notes. They say they will not give him any more money, and "the army'll make a man out of you", presenting him with his draft notice. In defiance, Claude leads the tribe in celebrating their vitality ("I Got Life").

Berger hands out imaginary pills to the tribe members, saying they are for high-profile people such as Richard Nixon, the Pope and "Alabama Wallace". He relates how he was expelled from high school. Three tribe members dress up as school principals in Hitler mustaches and swastika armbands, mocking the American education system. Berger and the tribe defy them, singing "Going Down". Claude returns from passing his draft board physical. He pretends to burn his Vietnam War draft card, which Berger reveals is a library card. Claude agonizes about what to do about being drafted. Two tribe members dressed as tourists arrive to ask the tribe why they have long hair. Claude and Berger lead the tribe in explaining the significance ("Hair"). The woman says kids should "be free, no guilt" and "do whatever you want, just so long as you don't hurt anyone." She observes that long hair is natural ("My Conviction"). She opens her coat to reveal that she is a man in drag. As the couple leaves, the tribe calls her Margaret Mead.

Sheila gives Berger a yellow shirt. He goofs around and tears it in two. Sheila laments that Berger cares more about the "bleeding crowd" than about her ("Easy to Be Hard"). Jeanie summarizes everyone's romantic entanglements: "I'm hung up on Claude, Sheila's hung up on Berger, Berger is hung up everywhere. Claude is hung up on a cross over Sheila and Berger." Berger, Woof and another tribe member pay satiric tribute to the American flag as they fold it ("Don't Put It Down"). The tribe joins the audience, inviting them to a Be-In. After young and innocent Crissy describes "Frank Mills", a boy she is looking for, the tribe participates in the "Be-In". The men burn their draft cards. Claude puts his card in the fire, changes his mind and pulls it out. He asks, "where is the something, where is the someone, that tells me why I live and die?" ("Where Do I Go"). The tribe appears naked, intoning "beads, flowers, freedom, happiness."

=== Act II ===
Some tribe members have the "Electric Blues". The tribe enters worshiping in an attempt to summon Claude ("Oh Great God of Power"). Claude returns from the induction center, and tribe members act out an imagined conversation from his draft interview, with Hud saying "the draft is white people sending black people to make war on the yellow people to defend the land they stole from the red people". Claude gives Woof a Mick Jagger poster; Woof is excited about the gift, as he is infatuated with Jagger. Three white women of the tribe tell why they like "Black Boys" ("black boys are delicious"), and three black women of the tribe, dressed like The Supremes, explain why they like "White Boys" ("white boys are so pretty").

Berger gives Claude a joint laced with a hallucinogen. Claude starts to trip as the tribe acts out his visions ("Walking in Space"). He hallucinates that he is skydiving from a plane into the jungles of Vietnam. Berger appears as General George Washington and is told to retreat because of an Indian attack. The Indians shoot all of Washington's men. General Ulysses S. Grant appears and begins a roll call: Abraham Lincoln (played by a black female tribe member), John Wilkes Booth, Calvin Coolidge, Clark Gable, Scarlett O'Hara, Aretha Franklin, Colonel George Custer. They all dance a minuet until African witch doctors kill them, except for Lincoln, who says, "I'm one of you". After the Africans sing his praises, Lincoln recites an alternate version of the Gettysburg Address ("Abie Baby"). Booth shoots Lincoln, but Lincoln tells him, "Shit! I'm not dyin' for no white man". As the visions continue, Buddhist monks enter. One pours a can of gasoline over another monk, who is set afire (reminiscent of the self-immolation of Thích Quảng Đức) and runs off screaming. Three Catholic nuns strangle the three remaining Buddhist monks. Three astronauts shoot the nuns with ray guns. Three Chinese people stab the astronauts. Three Native Americans kill the Chinese with bows and tomahawks. Three Green Berets kill the Native Americans with machine guns and then kill each other. A sergeant appears with two parents holding a suit on a hanger, talking to the suit as if it were their son of whom they are very proud. The bodies rise and play like children. The playing escalates to violence until they are all dead again. They rise again and comment about the casualties in Vietnam: "It's a dirty little war" ("Three-Five-Zero-Zero"). At the end of the sequence, two tribe members sing, over the dead bodies, Shakespeare's paean to the nobility of Man ("What A Piece of Work Is Man").

After the trip, Claude says "I can't take this moment to moment living on the streets. ... I want to be ... invisible". As they "look at the Moon", Sheila and the others enjoy a light moment ("Good Morning Starshine"). The tribe pays tribute to an old mattress ("The Bed"). Claude leaves as the tribe enters wrapped in blankets during a snowstorm. They begin a protest chant and then call for Claude. Claude enters dressed in a military uniform, his hair short, but the tribe does not see him because he is an invisible spirit. Claude says, "like it or not, they got me." The tribe sings "Flesh Failures". They move in front of Claude and launch into "Let the Sun Shine In"; as they exit, Claude is left lying in the center. During the curtain call, the tribe reprises "Let the Sun Shine In" and brings audience members on stage to dance.

(Note: This plot summary is based on the original Broadway script. The script has varied in subsequent productions.)

== Principal casts ==
Role	Off-Broadway	Broadway	Los Angeles	West End	Broadway Revival	Broadway Revival	West End Revival
Role	1967	1968			1977	2009	2010
Claude Hooper Bukowski	Walker Daniels	James Rado	James Rado	Paul Nicholas	Randall Easterbrook	Gavin Creel	Gavin Creel
George Berger	Gerome Ragni	Gerome Ragni	Gerome Ragni	Oliver Tobias	Michael Hoit	Will Swenson	Will Swenson
Sheila Franklin	Jill O'Hara	Lynn Kellogg	Jennifer Warnes	Annabel Leventon	Ellen Foley	Caissie Levy	Caissie Levy
Jeanie	Sally Eaton	Sally Eaton	Teda Bracci	Linda Kendrick	Iris Rosenkrantz	Kacie Sheik	Kacie Sheik
Neil "Woof" Donovan	Steve Dean	Steve Curry	Jobriath Salisbury	Vince Edwards	Scott Thornton	Bryce Ryness	Luther Creek
Hud	Arnold Wilkerson	Lamont Washington	Ben Vereen	Peter Straker	Cleavant Derricks	Darius Nichols	Darius Nichols
Chrissy	Shelley Plimpton	Shelley Plimpton	Kay Cole	Sonja Kristina	Kristin Vigard	Allison Case	Allison Case
Dionne	Jonelle Allen	Melba Moore	Gina Hardin	Helen Downing	Alaina Reed	Sasha Allen	Sasha Allen
"Aquarius" Soloist	Ronnie Dyson	Ronnie Dyson	Delores Hall	Vince Edwards	Alaina Reed	Sasha Allen	Sasha Allen

== Early productions ==
=== Broadway ===
Hair opened on Broadway at the Biltmore Theatre on April 29, 1968. The production was directed by O'Horgan and choreographed by Arenal, with designs by Robin Wagner (set), Nancy Potts (costumes), and Jules Fisher (lighting). The original Broadway cast included Rado and Ragni as Claude and Berger, Lynn Kellogg as Sheila, Lamont Washington as Hud, Eaton, Plimpton and Dyson reprising their off-Broadway roles as Jeanie, Crissy and the "Aquarius" soloist, Melba Moore as Dionne, Steve Curry as Woof, and Paul Jabara and Diane Keaton in the ensemble (both Moore and Keaton later played Sheila). Other replacements during the original Broadway run were Ben Vereen, Keith Carradine, Barry McGuire, Ted Lange, Meat Loaf, La La Brooks, Mary Seymour (of Musique), Joe Butler, Peppy Castro (of the Blues Magoos), Robin McNamara, Eddie Rambeau, Vicki Sue Robinson, Beverly Bremers, Bert Sommer, Dale Soules and Kim Milford. It was the first Broadway show to have a regular ticket price of $50, with 12 of the seats at this price for sale to large corporations from July 1968. The top price when it opened was $11.

The Hair team soon became embroiled in a lawsuit with the organizers of the Tony Awards. After assuring producer Michael Butler that commencing previews by April 3, 1968, would assure eligibility for the 1968 Tonys, the New York Theatre League ruled Hair ineligible, moving the cutoff date to March 19. The producers sued but were unable to force the League to reconsider. At the 1969 Tonys, Hair was nominated for Best Musical and Best Director but lost to 1776 in both categories. The production ran for four years and 1,750 performances, closing on July 1, 1972.

=== Early regional productions ===
The West Coast version played at the Aquarius Theater in Los Angeles beginning about six months after the Broadway opening and running for an unprecedented two years. The Los Angeles tribe included Rado, Ragni, Vereen (who played Hud and then replaced Ragni), Ted Neeley (who replaced Rado), Willie Weatherly (who played Berger and Claude), Meat Loaf, Gloria Jones, Táta Vega, Jobriath, Jennifer Warnes and Dobie Gray.

There were soon nine simultaneous productions in U.S. cities, followed by national tours. Performers in these included Joe Mantegna, André DeShields, Charlotte Crossley and Alaina Reed (Chicago), David Lasley, David Patrick Kelly, Meat Loaf, and Shaun Murphy (Detroit), Kenny Ortega and Arnold McCuller (tour), Bob Bingham (Seattle) and Philip Michael Thomas (San Francisco). The creative team from Broadway worked on Hair in Los Angeles, Chicago and San Francisco, as the Broadway staging served as a rough template for these and other early regional productions. In Los Angeles, Tom Smothers was co-producer. Regional casts consisted mostly of local actors, although a few Broadway cast members reprised their roles. O'Horgan or the authors sometimes took new ideas and improvisations from a regional show and brought them back to New York, such as when live chickens were tossed onto the stage in Los Angeles.

It was rare for so many productions to run simultaneously during an initial Broadway run. Butler, who had called Hair "the strongest anti-war statement ever written", said the reason he opened so many productions was to influence public opinion against the war and end it as soon as possible.

=== West End ===
Hair opened at the Shaftesbury Theatre in London on September 27, 1968, led by the same creative team as the Broadway production. The opening night was delayed until the abolition of theatre censorship in England under the Theatres Act 1968 so that the show could include nudity and profanity. As with other early productions, the London show added local allusions and other minor departures from the Broadway version.

The original London tribe included Sonja Kristina, Peter Straker, Paul Nicholas, Melba Moore, Annabel Leventon, Elaine Paige, Paul Korda, Marsha Hunt, Floella Benjamin, Alex Harvey, Oliver Tobias, Richard O'Brien and Tim Curry. This was Curry's first full-time theatrical acting role, where he met future Rocky Horror Show collaborator O'Brien. Hair's engagement in London surpassed the Broadway production, running for 1,997 performances until the roof of the theatre collapsed in July 1973.

=== Early international productions ===
Bertrand Castelli, Butler's partner and executive producer of the Broadway show, led the foreign-language productions. Castelli was a writer/producer known in Paris art circles. Butler called him a "crazy showman ... the guy with the business suit and beads". Castelli decided to do the show in the local language of each country at a time when Broadway shows were always done in English. The translations followed the original script closely, and the Broadway stagings were used. Each script contained local references. Castelli produced companies in France, Germany, Mexico and other countries, sometimes also directing the productions. The first European production, after London, opened in Stockholm, Sweden, on September 20, 1968, with a cast including Ulf Brunnberg and Bill Öhrström, produced and directed by Pierre Fränckel and choreographed by Arenal. It ran for 134 performances until March 1969.

A German production, directed by Castelli, opened a month later in Munich; the tribe included Donna Summer, Liz Mitchell and Donna Wyant. A Paris production opened on June 1, 1969. The original Australian production debuted in Sydney on June 6, 1969, produced by Harry M. Miller and directed by Jim Sharman, who also designed the production. The tribe included Keith Glass and then Reg Livermore as Berger, John Waters as Claude and Sharon Redd as The Magician. Redd was one of six African-Americans brought to Australia to provide a racially integrated tribe. The production broke local box-office records and ran for two years, but because of some of the language in the show, the cast album was banned in Queensland and New Zealand. The production transferred to Melbourne in 1971 and then had a national tour. It marked the theatrical debut of Marcia Hines. In Mexico the production was banned by the government after one night in Acapulco. 18-year-old Sônia Braga appeared in the 1969 Brazilian production.

A production in Belgrade, Yugoslavia, in 1969, was the first Hair produced in a communist country. The show, translated into Serbian, was directed by Mira Trailović at the Atelje 212 theatre. It featured Dragan Nikolić, Branko Milićević, Seka Sablić and Dušan Prelević. Over four years, the production played 250 performances and was attended by president Tito. Local references in the script included barbs aimed at Mao Zedong as well as Albania, Yugoslavia's traditional rival.

By 1970, Hair was a huge financial success, and 19 productions had been staged outside of North America, including in Scandinavia, South America, Italy, Israel, Japan, Canada, the Netherlands, Switzerland and Austria. According to Billboard, the productions took in almost $1 million every ten days, and royalties were being collected for 300 different recordings of the show's songs, making it "the most successful score in history as well as the most performed score ever written for the Broadway stage".

== Themes ==
Hair explores many themes of the hippie movement of the 1960s. Theatre critic Scott Miller wrote:

[Youth protests in the 1960s concerned] racism, environmental destruction, poverty, sexism and sexual repression, violence at home and the war in Vietnam, depersonalization from new technologies, and corruption in politics. ... [T]he hippies had great respect for America and believed that they were the true patriots. ... [Long] hair was the hippies' flag—their ... symbol not only of rebellion but also of ... the rejection of discrimination and restrictive gender roles. ... Drab work clothes (jeans, work shirts, pea coats) were a rejection of materialism. Clothing from ... the Third World and native Americans represented their awareness of the global community and their rejection of U.S. imperialism and selfishness. ... [N]atural fabrics were a rejection of synthetics, a return to natural things. ... [O]ld World War II or Civil War jackets [co-opted] the symbols of war into their newfound philosophy of nonviolence.

=== Race and the tribe ===
Extending the precedents set by Show Boat (1927) and Porgy and Bess (1935), Hair opened the Broadway musical to racial integration; fully one-third of the cast was African American. Except for satirically in skits, the roles for the black tribe members portrayed them as equals, breaking from traditional roles for black people in entertainment as slaves or servants. An Ebony article called the show the biggest outlet for black actors in the history of the U.S. stage. Several songs and scenes from the show address racial issues. "Colored Spade", introducing the character Hud, a militant black man, is a long list of racial slurs ("jungle bunny ... little black Sambo"). "Dead End", sung by black tribe members, is a list of street signs that symbolize black frustration and alienation. "Black Boys/White Boys" is an exuberant acknowledgment of interracial sexual attraction; the U.S. Supreme Court had not struck down laws banning interracial marriage until 1967. "Abie Baby" is part of the Act 2 "trip" sequence: four African witch doctors, who have just killed various American historical, cultural and fictional characters, sing the praises of Abraham Lincoln, portrayed by a black female tribe member, whom they decide not to kill. The first part of the song contains stereotypical language that black characters used in old movies, like "I's finished ... pluckin' y'all's chickens" and "I's free now thanks to y'all, Master Lincoln". The Lincoln character recites a modernized version of the Gettysburg Address while a white female tribe member polishes his shoes with her blond hair.

The script's many references to Native Americans are part of the anti-consumerist, naturalist focus of the hippie movement and of Hair. The characters are referred to as the "tribe", borrowing the term for Native American communities. The cast of each production chooses a tribal name. Miller wrote: "The practice is not just cosmetic ... the entire cast must work together, must like each other. ... All the sense of family, of belonging, of responsibility and loyalty inherent in the word 'tribe' has to be felt by the cast." To enhance this feeling, O'Horgan put the cast through sensitivity exercises based on trust, touching, listening and intensive examination that broke down barriers between the cast and crew and encouraged bonding.

=== Nudity, sexual freedom and drug use ===
The brief nude scene at the end of Act I was a subject of controversy and notoriety. "Much has been written about that scene ... most of it silly", wrote Gene Lees in High Fidelity. During "Where Do I Go?", those choosing to participate in the scene removed their clothes behind a scrim. At the musical cue, "they [stood] naked and motionless, their bodies bathed" in dim projections of floral patterns, chanting. It lasted 20 seconds. The scene prompted threats of censorship and even violent reactions in some places. It also became fodder for pop-culture jokes. Jack Benny quipped at a London preview, "Did you happen to notice if any of them were Jewish?" Groucho Marx joked, "I was gonna go see it ... [To save the $11 ticket price,] I went into my bathroom, took off all my clothes, and looked at myself in the full-length mirror."

The nudity was optional for the performers. The French cast was "the nudest" of the foreign groups, while the London cast "found nudity the hardest to achieve". In Copenhagen, the tribe thought the nudity too tame and decided to walk naked in the aisle during the show's prelude. In some early performances, the Germans played their scene behind a big sheet labeled "CENSORED". Miller writes, "nudity was a big part of the hippie culture, both as a rejection of the sexual repression of their parents and also as a statement about naturalism, spirituality, honesty, openness, and freedom. The naked body was beautiful, something to be celebrated and appreciated. ... They saw their bodies and their sexuality as gifts". According to Melba Moore, "It doesn't mean anything except what you want it to mean. ... It's like so much else people get uptight about." Donna Summer, who was in the German production, said that "it was not meant to be sexual. ... We stood naked to comment on the fact that society makes more of nudity than killing."

Hair glorifies sexual freedom in various ways. In addition to acceptance of interracial attraction, the characters' free love lifestyle acts as a sexually and politically charged updating of La bohème; as Rado explained, "The love element of the peace movement was palpable." In the song "Sodomy", Woof exhorts everyone to "join the holy orgy Kama Sutra". Toward the end of Act 2, the tribe members reveal their free love tendencies when they banter about who will sleep with whom that night.

Illegal drugs taken by the characters include a hallucinogen during the trip sequence. The song "Walking in Space" begins the sequence, declaring "how dare they try to end this beauty ... in this dive we rediscover sensation ... our eyes are open, wide, wide, wide". Similarly, in "Donna", Berger sings, "I'm evolving through the drugs that you put down." Generally, the tribe favors hallucinogenic or "mind expanding" drugs, such as LSD and marijuana.

=== Pacifism and environmentalism ===
The opposition to the war that pervades the show is unified by the plot thread that progresses through the book—Claude's moral dilemma over whether to burn his draft card. Pacifism is explored throughout the extended trip sequence in Act 2. The lyrics to "Three-Five-Zero-Zero", sung during that sequence, evoke the horrors of war ("ripped open by metal explosion"). The song is based on Allen Ginsberg's 1966 poem "Wichita Vortex Sutra", in which General Maxwell D. Taylor proudly reports to the press the number of enemy soldiers killed in one month, repeating it digit by digit for effect: "Three-Five-Zero-Zero". The song begins with images of death and dying and turns into a manic dance number, echoing Maxwell's glee at reporting the enemy casualties. The song also raises the issue of the disproportionate loss and disparate treatment of black servicemen in "decorations, promotion and duty assignments" in the Vietnam War, with the repeated phrase "Prisoners in niggertown/ It's a dirty little war".

"Don't Put It Down" satirizes the unexamined patriotism of people who are "crazy for the American flag". "Be In (Hare Krishna)" praises the peace movement and events like the San Francisco and Central Park Be-Ins. Throughout the show, the tribe chants popular protest slogans like "What do we want? Peace! When do we want it? Now!" and "Do not enter the induction center". The upbeat "Let the Sun Shine In" is a call to action, to reject the darkness of war and change the world for the better.

Hair also satirizes pollution. Jeanie appears wearing a gas mask and sings the song "Air": "Welcome, sulfur dioxide. Hello carbon monoxide. The air ... is everywhere", suggesting that pollution will eventually kill her: "vapor and fume at the stone of my tomb, breathing like a sullen perfume". In a comic, pro-green vein, Woof introduces himself by explaining that he "grows things", and Berger weaves nature imagery into the title song.

=== Religion and astrology ===
Religion, particularly Catholicism, appears both overtly and symbolically throughout the piece and is often the butt of jokes. Berger sings of looking for "my Donna", giving it the double meaning of a woman he is searching for and the Madonna. During "Sodomy", a hymn-like paean to all that is "dirty" about sex, the cast strikes evocative religious positions: the Pietà and Christ on the cross. Before the song, Woof recites a modified rosary. In Act II, when Berger gives famous figures imaginary pills, he offers "a pill for the Pope". In "Going Down", after being kicked out of school, Berger compares himself to Lucifer: "Just like the angel that fell / Banished forever to hell / Today have I been expelled / From high school heaven." Claude becomes a classic Christ figure at various points. In Act I, he says, "I am the Son of God. I shall vanish and be forgotten", then gives benediction to the tribe and the audience. He suffers from indecision, and, in his Gethsemane at the end of Act I, he asks "Where Do I Go?". The textual alludes to Claude being on a cross, and, in the end, he is chosen to give his life for the others. Berger is a John the Baptist figure, preparing the way for Claude.

Excerpt from "Aquarius"

Harmony and understanding
Sympathy and trust abounding.
No more falsehoods or derisions
Golden living dreams of visions
Mystic crystal revelation
And the mind's true liberation.
Aquarius

Songs like "Good Morning, Starshine" and "Aquarius" reflect the 1960s cultural interest in astrological and cosmic concepts. "Aquarius" was written after Rado researched his own astrological sign. The company's astrologer, Maria Crummere, was consulted about casting: Sheila was usually played by a Libra or Capricorn and Berger by a Leo. Crummere was also consulted on when the show would open on Broadway and in other cities. Playbill reported that she chose April 29, 1968, for the Broadway premiere.

The 29th was auspicious ... because the moon was high, indicating that people would attend in masses. The position of the 'history makers' (Pluto, Uranus, Jupiter) in the 10th house made the show unique, powerful and a money-maker. And that Neptune was on the ascendancy foretold that Hair would develop a reputation involving sex.

In Mexico, where Crummere did not pick the opening date, the show was closed by the government after one night. She disliked the date of the Boston opening (where the producers were sued over the show's content), saying, "Jupiter will be in opposition to naughty Saturn, and the show opens the very day of the sun's eclipse. Terrible".

=== Literary themes and symbolism ===
Hair makes many references to Shakespeare's plays and, at times, takes lyrical material directly from Shakespeare. For example, the lyrics to the song "What a Piece of Work Is Man" are from Hamlet (II: scene 2), and portions of "Flesh Failures" ("the rest is silence") are from Hamlet's final lines. In "Flesh Failures/Let the Sun Shine In", the lyrics "Eyes, look your last!/ Arms, take your last embrace! And lips, O you/ The doors of breath, seal with a righteous kiss" are from Romeo and Juliet (V: iii). According to Miller, the Romeo suicide imagery makes the point that, with our complicity in war, we are killing ourselves. Claude's indecision, especially his resistance to burning his draft card, which ultimately causes his demise, parallels Hamlet, "the melancholy hippie". This symbolism is carried into the last scene, where Claude appears as a ghostly spirit among his friends wearing an army uniform in an ironic echo of an earlier scene, where he says, "I know what I want to be ... invisible". Public Theater Artistic Director Oskar Eustis said:

Both [Hair and Hamlet] center on idealistic brilliant men as they struggle to find their place in a world marred by war, violence, and venal politics. They see both the luminous possibilities and the harshest realities of being human. In the end, unable to effectively combat the evil around them, they tragically succumb.

Other literary references include the song "Three-Five-Zero-Zero", based on Ginsberg's "Wichita Vortex Sutra", and, in the psychedelic drug trip sequence, the portrayal of Scarlett O'Hara from Gone with the Wind and activist African-American poet LeRoi Jones.

== Music ==
In these two measures of "What a Piece of Work Is Man", the red notes indicate a weak syllable on a strong beat.

After studying the music of the Bantu at Cape Town University, MacDermot incorporated African rhythms into the score of Hair. He listened to "what [the Bantu] called quaylas ... [which have a] very characteristic beat, very similar to rock. Much deeper though. ... Hair is very African—a lot of [the] rhythms, not the tunes so much." Quaylas stress beats on unexpected syllables, and this influence can be heard in songs like "What a Piece of Work Is Man" and "Ain't Got No Grass". MacDermot said, "My idea was to make a total funk show. They said they wanted rock & roll—but to me that translated to 'funk'." Funk influence is evident throughout the score, notably in songs like "Colored Spade" and "Walking in Space". But MacDermot said the songs "can't all be the same. You've got to get different styles. ... I like to think they're all a little different". The music in Hair varies from the rockabilly sensibilities of "Don't Put It Down" to the folk rock rhythms of "Frank Mills" and "What a Piece of Work Is Man" to rhythm and blues in "Easy to Be Hard" and protest rock anthems, such as "Ain't Got No" and "The Flesh Failures". The acid rock of "Walking in Space" and "Aquarius" are balanced by the mainstream pop of "Good Morning Starshine". Miller ties the music of Hair to the hippies' political themes:

The hippies ... were determined to create art of the people and their chosen art form, rock/folk music was by its definition, populist. ... [T]he hippies' music was often very angry, its anger directed at those who would prostitute the Constitution, who would sell America out, who would betray what America stood for; in other words, directed at their parents and the government.

The music did not resonate with everyone. Leonard Bernstein said, "the songs are just laundry lists", and walked out of the production. Richard Rodgers could hear only the beat and called it "one-third music". John Fogerty said, "Hair is such a watered-down version of what is really going on that I can't get behind it at all." For High Fidelity, Gene Lees wrote that John Lennon found the show "dull" and "I do not know any musician who thinks it's good." Theatre historian John Kenrick countered:

[Hair's] explosion of revolutionary proclamations, profanity and hard rock shook the musical theatre to its roots. ... Most people in the theatre business [and] Tony voters tried to ignore Hair's importance, shutting it out from any honors. However, some now insisted it was time for a change. New York Times critic Clive Barnes gushed that Hair was "the first Broadway musical in some time to have the authentic voice of today rather than the day before yesterday."

=== Songs ===
The score had many more songs than typical Broadway shows of the day. Most had about six to ten songs per act; Hair's total is in the thirties. This list reflects the songs most often included during the original Broadway run.

Act I

- "Aquarius" – Tribe and soloist (often Dionne)
- "Donna" – Berger and Tribe
- "Hashish" – Tribe
- "Sodomy" – Woof and Tribe
- "Colored Spade" – Hud, Woof, Berger, Claude and Tribe
- "Manchester England" – Claude and Tribe
- "I'm Black/Ain't Got No" – Woof, Hud, Dionne and Tribe
- "I Believe in Love" – Sheila and Tribe trio
- "Air" – Jeanie with Crissy and Dionne
- "Initials (L.B.J.)" – Tribe
- "I Got Life" – Claude and Tribe
- "Going Down" – Berger and Tribe
- "Hair" – Claude, Berger, and Tribe
- "My Conviction" – Margaret Mead (tourist lady)
- "Easy to Be Hard" – Sheila
- "Don't Put It Down" – Berger, Woof and male Tribe member
- "Frank Mills" – Crissy
- "Be-In (Hare Krishna)" – Tribe
- "Where Do I Go?" – Claude and Tribe

Act II

- "Electric Blues" – Tribe quartet
- "Black Boys" – Tribe sextet (three male, three female)
- "White Boys" – Tribe Supremes trio
- "Walking in Space" – Tribe
- "Yes, I's Finished/Abie Baby" – Abraham Lincoln and Tribe trio (Hud and two men)
- "Three-Five-Zero-Zero" – Tribe
- "What a Piece of Work Is Man" – Tribe duo
- "Good Morning Starshine" – Sheila and Tribe
- "The Bed" – Tribe
- "Aquarius" (reprise) – Tribe
- "Manchester England" (reprise) – Claude and Tribe
- "Eyes Look Your Last" – Claude and Tribe
- "The Flesh Failures (Let the Sun Shine In)" – Claude, Sheila, Dionne and Tribe

The show was under almost perpetual rewrite. Thirteen songs were added between the production at the Public Theater and Broadway. Others were cut; "What a piece of work is a man" and "Hashish" were originally spoken but musicalized for Broadway. Subsequent productions have included or cut others.

=== Recordings ===
The 1967 recording featured the off-Broadway cast. The 1968 original Broadway cast recording received a Grammy Award in 1969 for Best Score from an Original Cast Show Album and sold nearly 3 million copies in the U.S. by December 1969. It charted at No. 1 on the Billboard 200, the last Broadway cast album to do so (as of 2024), and stayed at No. 1 for 13 weeks in 1969. The album peaked at number 2 in Australia in 1970. According to The New York Times, "The cast album of Hair was ... a must-have for the middle classes. Its exotic orange-and-green cover art imprinted itself instantly and indelibly on the psyche. ... [It] became a pop-rock classic [with] an appeal that transcends particular tastes for genre or period." The Library of Congress added the original Broadway cast album to the National Recording Registry in 2019.

The 1969 studio album DisinHAIRited recorded 19 songs written for the show but not included in previous releases, a few of which were never included in stage productions. Some were cut between the Public and Broadway productions or were left off the original cast albums due to space. Productions in England, Germany, France, Sweden, Japan, Israel, the Netherlands, Australia and elsewhere released cast albums, Such broad attention was paid to the recordings of Hair that, after an unprecedented bidding war, ABC Records paid a record amount for MacDermot's next Broadway adaptation, Two Gentlemen of Verona. The 2009 revival recording debuted at No. 1 on Billboard's "Top Cast Album" chart and at No. 63 in the Top 200, making it the highest debuting album in Ghostlight Records history. The 1993 London revival cast album contains new music incorporated into the standard rental version.

More than 1,000 performances of individual songs from Hair have been recorded. The 5th Dimension's release of "Aquarius/Let the Sunshine In" in 1969 won Record of the Year in 1970 and topped the charts for six weeks. The Cowsills' recording of the title song "Hair" climbed to No. 2 on the Billboard Hot 100, while Oliver's "Good Morning Starshine" reached No. 3. Three Dog Night's "Easy to Be Hard" went to No. 4. Nina Simone's 1968 medley of "Ain't Got No, I Got Life" reached the top 5 on the UK singles chart. ASCAP confirmed that "Aquarius" was the most frequently played song on U.S. radio and television in 1970. Among other artists recording Hair songs are Shirley Bassey, Barbra Streisand and Diana Ross. "Good Morning Starshine" was sung on a 1969 episode of Sesame Street by Bob McGrath, and versions have been recorded by artists such as Sarah Brightman, Petula Clark and Strawberry Alarm Clock. Liza Minnelli and The Lemonheads recorded "Frank Mills", and Andrea McArdle, Jennifer Warnes and Sérgio Mendes each made versions of "Easy to Be Hard". Run DMC sampled "Where Do I Go" on its 1993 single "Down with the King", which went to No. 1 on the Billboard rap chart and reached the top 25 in the Billboard Hot 100 chart. Hair helped launch the recording careers of Meat Loaf, Dobie Gray, Jennifer Warnes, Jobriath, Bert Sommer, Ronnie Dyson, Donna Summer and Melba Moore. In 2004 "Aquarius", from the 1979 film version, was number 33 on AFI's 100 Years ... 100 Songs.

== Early critical reception ==
Reception of Hair's Broadway premiere was overwhelmingly positive. Clive Barnes wrote in The New York Times: "I think it is simply that it is so likable. So new, so fresh, and so unassuming, even in its pretensions." John J. O'Connor of The Wall Street Journal said the show was "exuberantly defiant and the production explodes into every nook and cranny of the Biltmore Theater". Richard Watts Jr. of the New York Post wrote that "it has a surprising if perhaps unintentional charm, its high spirits are contagious, and its young zestfulness makes it difficult to resist." Allan Jeffreys of ABC TV said the actors were "the most talented hippies you'll ever see ... directed in a wonderfully wild fashion by Tom O'Horgan." Leonard Probst of NBC said "Hair is the only new concept in musicals on Broadway in years and it's more fun than any other this season". John Wingate of WOR TV praised MacDermot's "dynamic score" that "blasts and soars", and Len Harris of CBS said "I've finally found the best musical of the Broadway season ... it's that sloppy, vulgar, terrific tribal love rock musical Hair."

A dissenting review in Variety called the show "loony" and "without a story, form, music, dancing, beauty or artistry. ... It's impossible to tell whether [the cast has] talent. Maybe talent is irrelevant in this new kind of show business." In Newsweek, Jack Kroll wrote, "There is no denying the sheer kinetic drive of this new Hair ... there is something hard, grabby, slightly corrupt about O'Horgan's virtuosity, like Busby Berkeley gone bitchy." A Time critic wrote that although the show "thrums with vitality, [it is] crippled by being a bookless musical and, like a boneless fish, it drifts when it should swim."

When Hair opened in London, critic Irving Wardle of The Times wrote, "Its honesty and passion give it the quality of a true theatrical celebration—the joyous sound of a group of people telling the world exactly what they feel." In the Financial Times, B. A. Young wrote that Hair was "not only a wildly enjoyable evening, but a thoroughly moral one." In his final review before retiring, 78-year-old W. A. Darlington of The Daily Telegraph wrote that he had "tried hard" but found the evening "a complete bore—noisy, ugly and quite desperately funny". Of such critiques, Miller wrote in 2001, "some people can't see past the appearance of chaos and randomness to the brilliant construction and sophisticated imagery underneath", adding, "Not only did many of the lyrics not rhyme, but many of the songs didn't really have endings, just a slowing down and stopping, so the audience didn't know when to applaud. ... The show rejected every convention of Broadway [and] of traditional theatre."

== Social change ==
Excerpts from the title song "Hair"

I let it fly in the breeze and get caught in the trees,
Give a home to the fleas in my hair.
A home for fleas, a hive for bees
A nest for birds, there ain't no words
For the beauty, the splendor, the wonder of my Hair. ...

Flow it, show it, long as God can grow it, my hair. ...
Oh say, can you see my eyes? If you can
Then my hair's too short. ...

They'll be ga ga at the Go Go when they see me in my toga,
My toga made of blond, brilliantined, biblical hair.
My hair like Jesus wore it,
Hallelujah, I adore it. ...

Hair challenged many of the norms of Western society in 1968. The name itself was a reaction to the restrictions of civilization and consumerism and a preference for naturalism. Rado recalled that long hair "was a visible form of awareness in the consciousness expansion. The longer the hair got, the more expansive the mind was. Long hair was shocking, and it was a revolutionary act to grow long hair. It was kind of a flag, really."

The musical caused controversy. It was the first time a Broadway show had seen totally naked performers, and the show was charged with the desecration of the American flag and the use of obscene language. These controversies, and the anti-Vietnam War theme, attracted occasional threats and violence during the show's early years and became the basis for legal actions. Two cases eventually reached the U.S. Supreme Court. In Indiana cities, the producers were either refused booking, had difficulty securing a theater, or the production was picketed by church groups. Productions in the U.S. were frequently confronted with the closure of theaters by the fire marshal. Chattanooga's 1972 refusal to allow Hair to play at the city-owned Memorial Auditorium was later found by the Supreme Court to be an unlawful prior restraint.

Legal challenges against the Boston production were appealed to the U.S. Supreme Court. The Chief of the Licensing Bureau said, "anyone who desecrates the flag should be whipped on Boston Common." Although the scene was removed before opening, the District Attorney alleged that "lewd and lascivious" actions were taking place onstage. Hair obtained an injunction from the Superior Court against criminal prosecution, and the D.A. appealed to the Massachusetts Supreme Judicial Court. At the request of both parties, several of the justices viewed the production; the court ruled that "the cast [must] be clothed to a reasonable extent." The cast defiantly played the scene nude later that night, saying the ruling was vague about when it took effect. The next day, the production closed. After a Federal appellate bench reversed the Massachusetts court's ruling, the D.A. appealed the case to the U.S. Supreme Court. In a 4–4 decision, the Court upheld the reversal, allowing Hair to reopen.

A 1969 Acapulco, Mexico, production played for one night. The theater, across the street from a popular bordello, was padlocked by the government, which called the production "detrimental to the morals of youth". The cast was arrested and agreed to leave the country, but because of legal complications they went into hiding. They were expelled from Mexico days later. In Bergen, Norway, citizens formed a human barricade to try to prevent the performance. In St. Paul, Minnesota, a protesting clergyman released mice in the lobby, hoping to frighten the audience. Jim Lovell and Jack Swigert, after naming Apollo 13's lunar module "Aquarius" after the song, walked out of the production at the Biltmore in protest of perceived anti-Americanism and disrespect of the flag. In April 1971, a bomb was thrown at Hair's theater in Cleveland, Ohio, bouncing off the marquee; the blast shattered windows in the building and nearby storefronts. The same month, the families of a cast member and the stage manager died in a fire in the Cleveland hotel where members of the show's troupe were staying. The Sydney, Australia, production's opening night was interrupted by a bomb scare in 1969.

Hair effectively marked the end of stage censorship in the United Kingdom. London's stage censor, the Lord Chamberlain, refused to license the musical, and the opening was delayed until Parliament passed a bill stripping his licensing power. San Francisco's large hippie population considered the show an extension of their street activities, blurring the barrier between art and life by frequently meditating with the cast and joining them onstage during the show. 18-year-old Princess Anne danced onstage in London. In Munich, authorities threatened to close the production if the nude scene remained, but after a Hair spokesman said his relatives had been marched nude into Auschwitz, the authorities relented. The Paris production encountered little controversy, nudity being common onstage in Paris. But even in Paris there was occasional opposition, as when a member of the Salvation Army used a portable loudspeaker to exhort the audience to halt the presentation.

== Subsequent productions ==
=== 1970s to 1990s ===
The first college production took place in 1970 at Memphis State University, Tennessee, directed by Keith Kennedy. The cast participated in the Atlanta International Pop Festival in 1970. WMC-TV produced a 1971 documentary chronicling the production.

In 1977, a Broadway revival of Hair produced by Michael Butler and directed by O'Horgan ran for 43 performances at the Biltmore Theater. The cast included Ellen Foley, Annie Golden, Loretta Devine, Cleavant Derricks and Kristen Vigard. Reviews were generally negative, and critics accused the musical of "showing its gray". A 1985 production in Montreal was reportedly the 70th professional production. A 20th-anniversary benefit concert was held in May 1988 at the United Nations General Assembly. The event was sponsored by First Lady Nancy Reagan and introduced by Barbara Walters. Rado, Ragni and MacDermot reunited to write nine new songs for the concert. The cast of 163 included former stars from productions around the globe, Moore, Vereen, Williams and Summer, as well as guest performers Bea Arthur, Frank Stallone and Dr. Ruth Westheimer. Ticket prices ranged from $250 to $5,000, and the proceeds went to the United States Committee for UNICEF and the Creo Society's Fund for Children with AIDS. In November 1988, Butler produced Hair at Chicago's Vic Theater. The production was well received and ran until February 1989.

From 1990 to 1991, Pink Lace Productions ran a U.S. national tour of Hair. A 1990 "bus and truck" production toured Europe for over 3 years. Even after Ragni died in 1991, MacDermot and Rado continued to write new songs for revivals through the 1990s. Hair Sarajevo, AD 1992 was staged during the siege of Sarajevo as an appeal for peace. Rado directed a US national 25th-anniversary tour in 1994 featuring actor Luther Creek; MacDermot returned to oversee the music. Rado also directed various European productions from 1995 to 1999. A production ran in Australia in 1992, and a London revival starring John Barrowman and Paul Hipp opened at the Old Vic in 1993, directed by Michael Bogdanov. A Guardian review suggested that its failure stemmed from a cast of "Thatcher's children who didn't really get it". South African productions began only after the eradication of apartheid. In 1996, Butler staged a revival in Chicago, concurrent with the 1996 Democratic National Convention, echoing the last time the DNC was in Chicago: 1968. A 30th-anniversary Off-off Broadway production was staged at Third Eye Repertory, directed by Shawn Rozsa.

=== 2000s and 2010s ===
In 2001, Reprise Theatre Company in Los Angeles performed Hair at the Wadsworth Theatre, starring Steven Weber as Berger, Sam Harris as Claude and Jennifer Leigh Warren as Sheila. Encores! presented a 2001 production at City Center, starring Luther Creek, Idina Menzel and Tom Plotkin, with MacDermot playing the keyboards. An Actors' Fund benefit of the show was performed for one night at the New Amsterdam Theater in New York City in 2004.

In 2005, a London production opened at the Gate Theatre, directed by Daniel Kramer. Rado approved an updating of the musical's script to place it in the context of the Iraq War. In Kramer's modernized interpretation, the nudity called to mind images from Abu Ghraib. In 2006, Rado collaborated with director Robert Prior on a CanStage production in Toronto. A revival produced by Pieter Toerien toured South Africa in 2007, directed by Paul Warwick Griffin. From September to December 2007, Hair ran at the MET Theatre in Los Angeles, produced by Butler and directed and choreographed by Bo Crowell, with musical direction by Christian Nesmith. It won the LA Weekly Theater Award for Musical of the Year.

It was a show about now when we did it. Now it's a show about then – but it's still about now.

— James Rado, 2008

For three nights in September 2007, Joe's Pub and the Public Theater presented a 40th-anniversary production at the Delacorte Theater in Central Park. This concert version, directed by Diane Paulus, featured MacDermot on keyboards and starred Jonathan Groff as Claude, Karen Olivo as Sheila and Will Swenson as Berger. Actors from the original Broadway production joined the cast onstage during the encore of "Let the Sun Shine In". Demand for the show was extraordinary. The Public presented a fully staged production of Hair at the Delacorte from July to September 2008. Paulus again directed, with choreography by Karole Armitage. Groff and Swenson returned as Claude and Berger, with others from the concert cast. Caren Lyn Manuel played Sheila, and Christopher J. Hanke replaced Groff as Claude on August 17. Reviews were generally positive, with Ben Brantley of The New York Times writing, "this production establishes the show as more than a vivacious period piece". Time magazine wrote: "Hair ... has been reinvigorated and reclaimed as one of the great milestones in musical-theatre history. ... Today Hair seems, if anything, more daring than ever."

==== 2009 Broadway revival and 2010 U.S. national tour ====
The Public Theater production transferred to Broadway at the Al Hirschfeld Theatre, beginning previews on March 6, 2009, with an official opening on March 31, 2009. Paulus and Armitage again directed and choreographed, and most of the cast returned from the production in the park. A pre-performance ticket lottery was held nightly for $25 box-seat tickets. The opening cast included Gavin Creel as Claude, Swenson as Berger, Caissie Levy as Sheila, Megan Lawrence as Mother and Sasha Allen as Dionne. Designers included Scott Pask (sets), Michael McDonald (costumes), Kevin Adams (lighting), and Acme Sound Partners (sound). Critical response was almost uniformly positive. The New York Daily News praised the direction, "colorfully kinetic" choreography and technical features, writing, "as a smile-inducing celebration of life and freedom, [Hair is] highly communicable" and warning: "If you're seated on the aisle, count on [the cast] to be in your face or your lap". The New York Post wrote of the "triumphant" production: These days, the nation is fixated less on war and more on the economy. As a result, the scenes that resonate most are the ones in which the kids exultantly reject the rat race." Variety enthused, "Paulus and her prodigiously talented cast ... cut right to the 1967 rock musical's heart, generating tremendous energy. ... If this explosive production doesn't stir something in you ... check your pulse." The Boston Globe dissented, saying the revival "felt canned" and "overblown" and "feels unbearably naive and unforgivably glib". Ben Brantley, writing for The New York Times, reflected the majority:

This emotionally rich revival ... delivers ... the intense, unadulterated joy and anguish of that bi-polar state called youth. ... Armitage's happy hippie choreography, with its group gropes and mass writhing, looks as if it's being invented on the spot. But there's intelligent form within the seeming formlessness. ... [Paulus finds] depths of character and feeling in [the 1968 show about kids] frightened of how the future is going to change them. ... After the show I couldn't stop thinking about what would happen to [the characters]. Mr. MacDermot's music ... holds up beautifully, given infectious life by the ... flavorfully blended voices of the cast.

The Public Theater struggled to raise the budget for the Broadway transfer. Paulus helped keep costs low by using an inexpensive set, and the show sold well. On April 30, 2009, on the Late Show with David Letterman, the cast recreated a performance on the same stage at the Ed Sullivan Theater by the original tribe. The production won the Tony Award for Best Revival of a Musical and the Drama Desk Award for Outstanding Revival of a Musical. By August, the revival had recouped its $5,760,000 investment, becoming one of the fastest-recouping musicals in Broadway history. Its cast album was nominated for the 2010 Grammy Award for Best Musical Show Album. When the Broadway cast transferred to London for the 2010 West End revival, a mostly new tribe took over on Broadway on March 9, 2010, including Ace Young as Berger, Diana DeGarmo as Sheila, Kyle Riabko as Claude, Annaleigh Ashford as Jeanie, Wallace Smith as Hud, and Vanessa Ray as Chrissie. Rachel Bay Jones later played Mother and other roles. Sales decreased, and the revival closed on June 27, 2010, after 29 previews and 519 regular performances.

A U.S. national tour of the production began on October 21, 2010, starring Steel Burkhardt as Berger, Paris Remillard as Claude and Caren Lyn Tackett as Sheila. The tour received mostly positive reviews. The show returned to Broadway at the St. James Theatre from July 5 to September 10, 2011. After that, the tour resumed, ending on January 29, 2012.

==== 2010 West End revival ====
The 2009 Broadway production was duplicated at the Gielgud Theatre in London's West End. Previews began on April 1, 2010, with an official opening on April 14. The producers were the Public Theater, together with Cameron Mackintosh and Broadway Across America. Nearly all of the New York cast relocated, but Luther Creek played Woof. The revival closed on September 4, 2010.

A review by Michael Billington of The Guardian described it as "a vibrant, joyous piece of living theatre", writing, "it celebrates a period when the joy of life was pitted against the forces of intolerance and the death-dealing might of the military–industrial complex." Charles Spencer in The Daily Telegraph agreed: "This is a timely and irresistibly vital revival of the greatest of all rock musicals." Michael Coveney of The Independent wrote that Hair is "one of the great musicals of all time, and a phenomenon that, I'm relieved to discover, stands up as a period piece". In The Times, Benedict Nightingale commented that "it's exhilarating, as well as oddly poignant, when a multihued cast ... race downstage while delivering that tuneful salute to an age of Aquarius that still refuses to dawn."

==== 2014–present ====
In August 2014, Hair played a three-night engagement at the Hollywood Bowl. Directed by Adam Shankman, the cast included Kristen Bell as Sheila, Hunter Parrish as Claude, Benjamin Walker as Berger, Amber Riley as Dionne, Jenna Ushkowitz as Jeanie, Sarah Hyland as Crissy, Mario as Hud, Jonah Platt as Woof, and Beverly D'Angelo and Kevin Chamberlin as Claude's parents.

A 2016 production in Manchester, England, at the Hope Mill Theatre, directed by Jonathan O'Boyle, starring Robert Metson as Claude, Laura Johnson as Sheila and Ryan Anderson as Berger, earned positive reviews. In 2017, the musical's 50th anniversary, the staging was repeated Off West End at The Vaults theatre in London, with Metson and Johnson repeating their roles and Andy Coxon as Berger. The production won the WhatsOnStage Award for Best Off-West End Production. A UK national tour of the production began in March 2019, starring Jake Quickenden as Berger, Daisy Wood-Davis as Sheila, Paul Wilkins as Claude and Marcus Collins as Hud.

=== International success ===
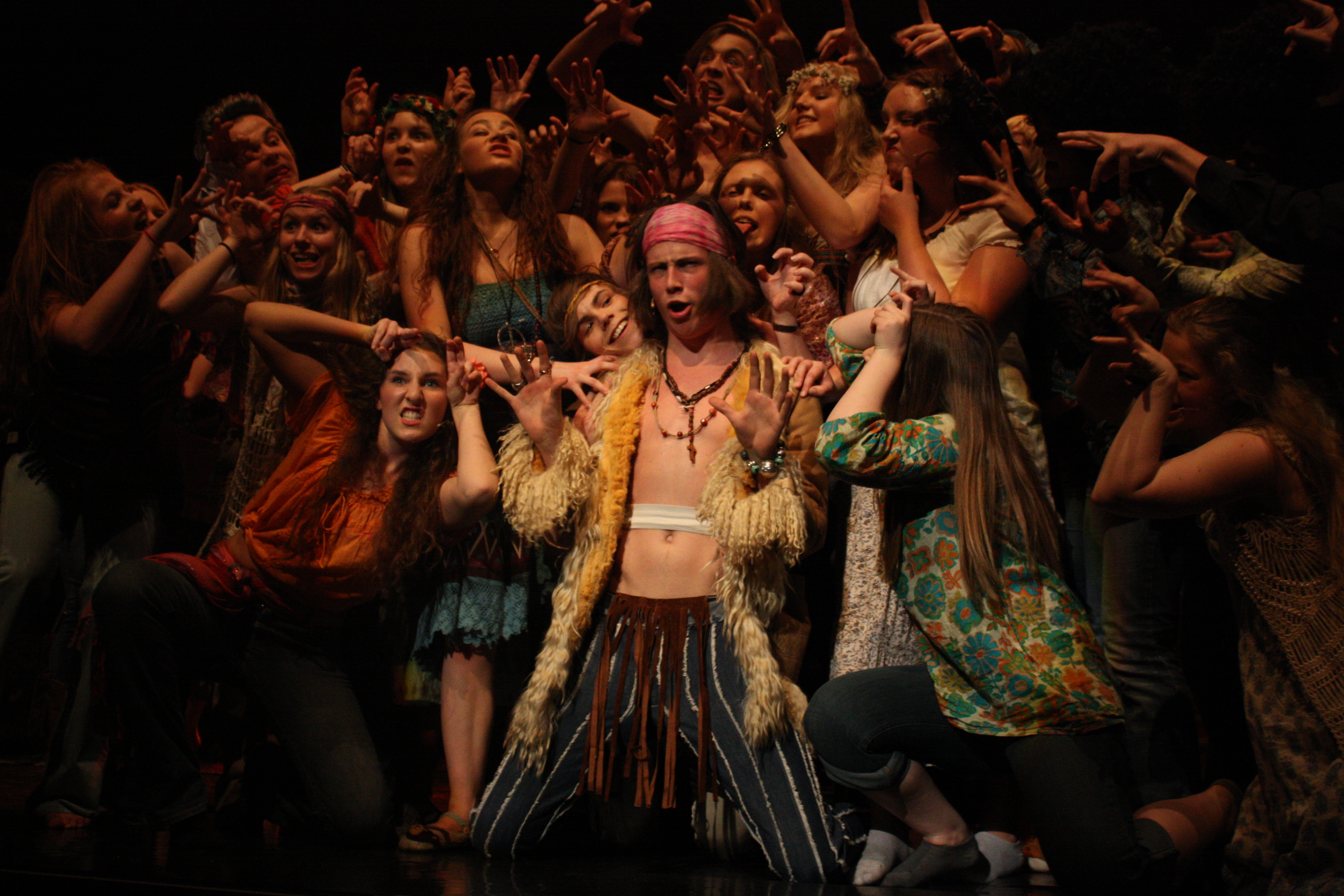
Hair in Norway, 2011

Hair has been performed in most countries. After the Berlin Wall fell, the show traveled for the first time to Poland, Lebanon, the Czech Republic and Sarajevo (featured on ABC's Nightline, when Phil Alden Robinson visited in 1996 and discovered a production of Hair there in the midst of the war). In 1999, Butler and director Bo Crowell helped produce Hair in Russia at the Stas Namin Theatre in Moscow's Gorky Park. The production caused a similar reaction as the original did 30 years earlier because Russian soldiers were fighting in Chechnya at the time.

Rado wrote in 2003 that the only places where the show had not been performed were "China, India, Vietnam, the Arctic and Antarctic continents as well as most African countries." Since then, an Indian production has been mounted.

== Adaptations ==
=== Film ===
A musical film adaptation was released in 1979. Directed by Miloš Forman with choreography by Twyla Tharp and a screenplay by Michael Weller, the film stars John Savage, Treat Williams and Beverly D'Angelo, with Golden, Moore, Dyson, Foley, Dorsey Wright, Don Dacus, Nell Carter and Cheryl Barnes. It was nominated for two Golden Globes: Best Motion Picture – Musical or Comedy, and New Star of the Year in a Motion Picture (for Williams), and Forman was nominated for a César Award.

Several songs were deleted, and the film's more conventionally romantic storyline departs greatly from the musical. Claude is rewritten as an innocent draftee from Oklahoma, newly arrived in New York to join the military, and Sheila is a high-society debutante who catches his eye. The friendly tribe adopts the farm boy in Central Park and, led by Berger, tries to facilitate the romance. During Claude's basic training, they bring Sheila for a tryst with Claude, substituting Berger in his barracks wearing Claude's dogtags. A mistake leads Berger to be taken to Vietnam in Claude's place, where he is killed. While the film received generally positive reviews, Ragni and Rado said its comic portrayal of the tribe failed to capture the essence of Hair by portraying hippies as "oddballs" without any connection to the peace movement.

== Popular culture ==
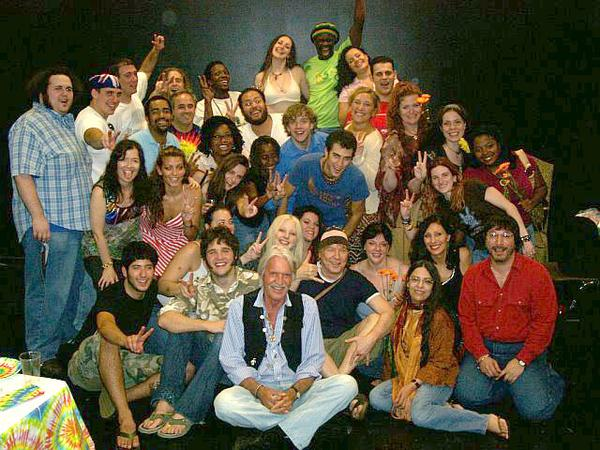
Butler (front) and Rado (behind Butler, in black T-shirt and cap) with a 2006 Hair cast in Red Bank, New Jersey

The New York Times noted in 2007 that "Hair was one of the last Broadway musicals to saturate the culture as shows from the golden age once regularly did." Songs from the musical have been featured in films and television episodes. For example, in the 2005 film Charlie and the Chocolate Factory, the character Willy Wonka welcomed the children with lyrics from "Good Morning Starshine". "Aquarius" was performed in the final episode of Laverne and Shirley in 1983, where the character Carmine moves to New York City and auditions for Hair. "Aquarius/Let the Sun Shine In" was also performed in the final scene in the film The 40-Year-Old Virgin, and Three Dog Night's recording of "Easy to Be Hard" was featured in David Fincher's film Zodiac. On The Simpsons episode "The Springfield Files", townspeople sing "Good Morning Starshine". The episode "Hairography" of Glee includes a mash-up of the songs "Hair" and "Crazy in Love" by Beyoncé. Head of the Class featured a two-part episode in 1990, titled "Hair to Eternity", in which the head of the English department is determined to disrupt the school's performance of Hair.

Hair continues to be a popular choice for high-school, university, and amateur productions. In 2002, Peter Jennings featured a Boulder, Colorado, high-school production in his ABC documentary series In Search of America. A 2006 community theater production in Red Bank, New Jersey, was singled out by Butler as "one of the best Hairs I have seen in a long time." A production by Mountain Play ran at the 4,000-seat Cushing Memorial Amphitheatre in Mount Tamalpais State Park in Mill Valley, California, in 2007.

== Legacy ==
Hair was Broadway's "first fully realized" concept musical, a form that dominated the musical theatre of the seventies. While the development of the concept musical was an unexpected consequence of Hair's tenure on Broadway, the expected rock music revolution on Broadway turned out to be less than complete.

MacDermot followed Hair with three successive rock scores: Two Gentlemen of Verona (1971); Dude (1972), a second collaboration with Ragni; and Via Galactica (1972). While Two Gentlemen of Verona found receptive audiences and a Tony for Best Musical, Dude failed after just sixteen performances, and Via Galactica flopped after a month. According to Horn, these and other such "failures may have been the result of producers simply relying on the label 'rock musical' to attract audiences without regard to the quality of the material presented". By the late 1970s, the genre had played itself out. Audience tastes in the 1980s turned to megamusicals with pop scores. Some later rock musicals, such as Rent (1996) and Spring Awakening (2006), as well as jukebox musicals featuring rock music, like We Will Rock You (2002) and Rock of Ages (2009), have found success. But the rock musical did not quickly come to dominate the musical theatre stage after Hair. Critic Clive Barnes commented: "No major rock musician ever did a rock score for Broadway. ... Tommy ... was never conceived as a Broadway show. ... And one can see why. There's so much more money in records and rock concerts." The continued popularity of Hair in the 21st century is seen in its number ten ranking in a 2006 BBC Radio 2 listener poll of the "[United Kingdom]'s Number One Essential Musicals".

On the other hand, Hair had a profound effect not only on what was acceptable on Broadway, but as part of the very social movements that it celebrated. For example, in 1970, Butler, Castelli and the various Hair casts contributed to fundraising for the World Assembly of Youth. The Assembly enabled 750 young representatives from around the world to meet in New York in July 1970 to discuss social issues. For about a week, cast members worldwide collected donations at every show for the fund. Hair raised around $250,000 and ended up being the principal financier of the Assembly. Cast and crew also contributed a day's pay, and Butler contributed a day's profits from these productions. Moreover, as Ellen Stewart, founder of La MaMa E. T. C., noted:

Hair came with blue jeans, comfortable clothing, colors, beautiful colors, sounds, movement. ... And [now everyone's] got on blue jeans. ... You can go anywhere you want, and [see] what Hair did. ... A kind of emancipation, a spiritual emancipation that came from [O'Horgan's] staging. ... Hair until this date has influenced every single thing that you see ... anywhere in the world, you will see elements of the experimental techniques that Hair brought not just to Broadway, but to the entire world.

== Awards and nominations ==
=== Original Broadway production ===
Year	Award ceremony	Category	Nominee	Result
1969	Tony Awards	Best Musical		Nominated
1969	Tony Awards	Best Direction of a Musical	Tom O'Horgan	Nominated
1969	Grammy Awards	Best Score From an Original Cast Show Album	Galt MacDermot, Gerome Ragni & James Rado (composers); Andy Wiswell (producer)	Won

=== 2009 Broadway revival ===
Year	Award ceremony	Category	Nominee	Result
2009	Tony Awards	Best Revival of a Musical		Won
2009	Tony Awards	Best Performance by a Leading Actor in a Musical	Gavin Creel	Nominated
2009	Tony Awards	Best Performance by a Featured Actor in a Musical	Will Swenson	Nominated
2009	Tony Awards	Best Costume Design of a Musical	Michael McDonald	Nominated
2009	Tony Awards	Best Lighting Design of a Musical	Kevin Adams	Nominated
2009	Tony Awards	Best Sound Design of a Musical	Acme Sound Partners	Nominated
2009	Tony Awards	Best Direction of a Musical	Diane Paulus	Nominated
2009	Tony Awards	Best Choreography	Karole Armitage	Nominated
2009	Drama Desk Awards	Outstanding Revival of a Musical		Won
2009	Drama Desk Awards	Outstanding Actor in a Musical	Will Swenson	Nominated
2009	Drama Desk Awards	Outstanding Featured Actor in a Musical	Bryce Ryness	Nominated
2009	Drama Desk Awards	Outstanding Director of a Musical	Diane Paulus	Nominated
2009	Drama Desk Awards	Outstanding Choreography	Karole Armitage	Nominated
2009	Drama Desk Awards	Outstanding Set Design	Scott Pask	Nominated
2009	Drama Desk Awards	Outstanding Costume Design	Michael McDonald	Nominated
2009	Drama Desk Awards	Outstanding Lighting Design in a Musical	Kevin Adams	Nominated

== See also ==
- List of plays with anti-war themes
- List of anti-war songs
