= Putney Swope =

1969 film by Robert Downey, Sr.

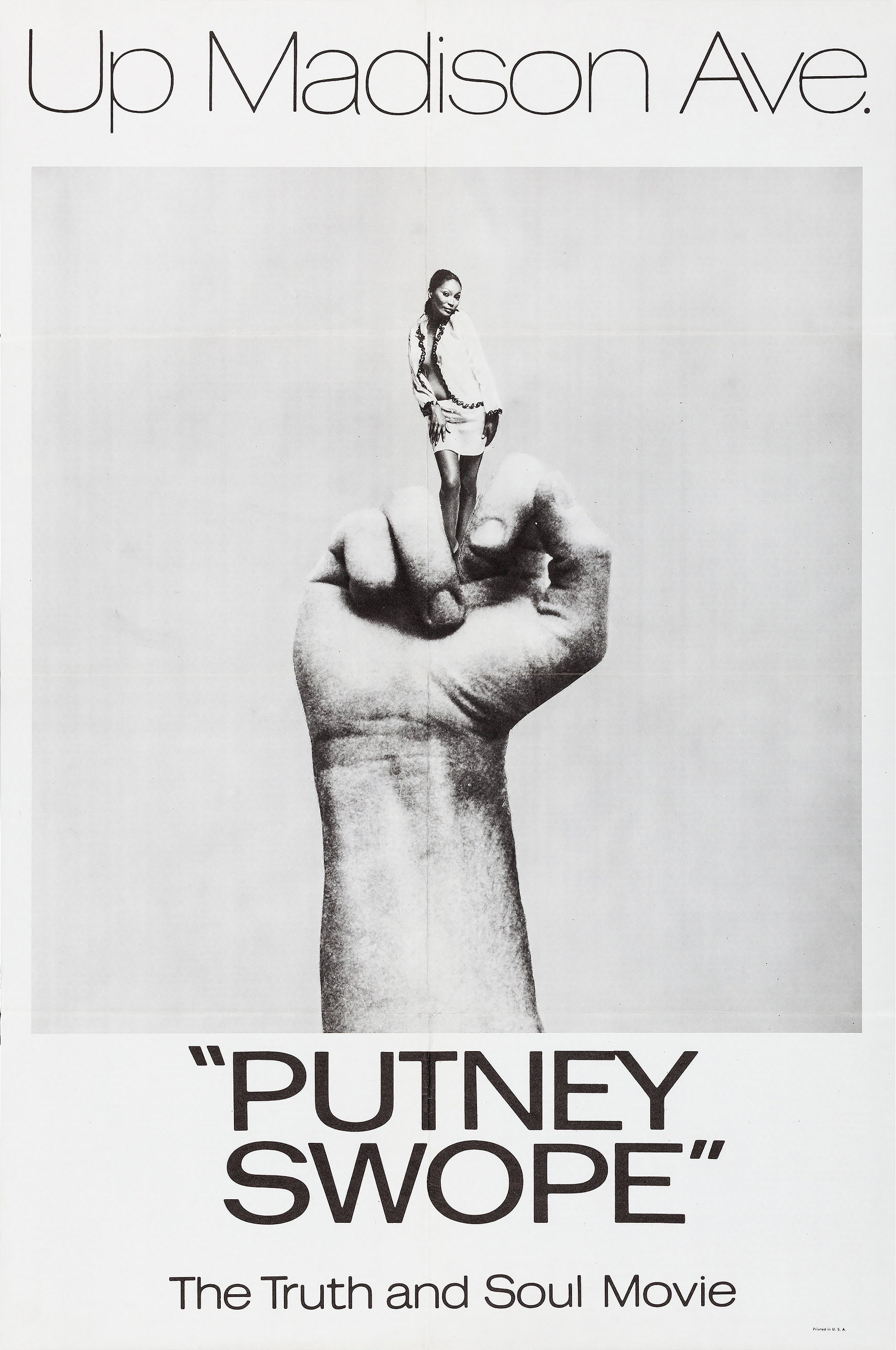
- Theatrical release poster
- Directed by: Robert Downey Sr.
- Written by: Robert Downey Sr.
- Produced by: Fred C. Caruso; Richard A. Roth
- Starring: Arnold Johnson
- Cinematography: Gerald Cotts
- Edited by: Bud S. Smith
- Music by: Charley Cuva
- Production company: Herald Productions
- Distributed by: Cinema V
- Release date: July 10, 1969
- Running time: 84 minutes
- Country: United States
- Language: English
- Budget: $120,000

Putney Swope is a 1969 American independent satirical comedy film written and directed by Robert Downey Sr., and starring Arnold Johnson as the title character, a black advertising executive. The film satirizes the advertising world, the portrayal of race in Hollywood films and the nature of corporate corruption.

In 2016, the film was selected for preservation in the United States National Film Registry by the Library of Congress as being "culturally, historically, or aesthetically significant".

== Plot ==
Putney Swope (Arnold Johnson, voiced by Robert Downey Sr.), the only black man on the executive board of an advertising firm, is inadvertently put in charge after the sudden death of the chairman of the board. Prevented by the company by-laws from voting for themselves, board members vote by secret ballot for Putney under the assumption that he won't win.

Renaming the business "Truth and Soul, Inc.", Swope replaces all but one of the white employees with black employees and insists they no longer accept business from companies that produce alcohol, tobacco or toy guns. Throughout the movie, a series of bizarre, surreal ads for breakfast cereal, air conditioners, skin cream, and airliners are shown, often featuring obscenity or nudity. Swope's leadership style is eccentric and erratic, with him frequently firing employees after taking their ideas.

The success of the business draws attention from the United States government and the President (Pepi Hermine), who is in the pocket of the owner of the "Borman Six", an automobile company. The president orders Swope to create an advertisement for their new automobile. Swope attempts to create an advertisement, but it goes poorly when an overweight actress tips the car over and crashes it. Incensed, the president of the Borman Six demands it not be put on TV, but Swope refuses and airs it anyway.

Afterwards, Truth & Soul is swarmed with demonstrators, protesting the vulgarity and obscenity of Truth and Soul's advertisements. The president meets with Swope (dressed as Fidel Castro), who tells Swope it is "discrimination" to not advertise alcohol, cigarettes, or toy guns, and that the demonstrations will continue unless he relents.

In a board meeting, Swope tells the board that they will begin creating advertisements for alcohol, cigarettes, and toy guns, to which the members of the board react with outrage and accuse him of selling out. Swope later mentions to his bodyguard that this was a test to see if his followers would stick to their ideals. He orders his guards to split up the company's money evenly to everyone, except to one employee known as the Arab, who has been critical of Swope's leadership throughout the film. The board members return to Swope and say they have changed their mind, and are happy to advertise whatever he wants to sell. Disillusioned, Swope silently walks away, leaving them to squabble over a glass bin full of the company's money. The Arab, upon finding out he is not receiving any, sets the money on fire with a Molotov cocktail, which burns as the credits roll.

== Cast ==
(as listed in the end credits by order of appearance)

- Stan Gottlieb as Nathan (credited as Stanley Gottlieb)
- Allen Garfield as Elias Jr.
- Archie Russell as Joker
- Ramon Gordon as Bissinger
- Bert Lawrence as Hawker
- Joe Madden as Mr. Syllables (credited as Joe Engler)
- Arnold Johnson as Putney Swope
  - Voice dubbed by Robert Downey Sr.
- David Kirk as Elias Sr.
- Don George as Mr. Cards
- Buddy Butler as Putney's Bodyguard
- Vincent Hamill as Man In White Suit
- Tom Odachi as Wing Soney
- Ching Yeh as Wing Soney Jr.
- Spunky-Funk Johnson as Mr. Major
- Joe Fields as Pittsburgh Willie
- Norman Schreiber as Messenger
- Robert Staats as "Mr. War Toys"
- Alan Abel as "Mr. Lucky"
- Sol Brawerman as "Mr. Dinkleberry"
- Ben Israel as "Mr. Pit Stop"
- Mel Brooks as "Mr. Forget It" (not to be confused with Mel Brooks)
- Louise Heath as Secretary
- Barbara Clarke as Secretary
- Catherine Lojacono as Lady Beaver
- JohnJohn Robinson as Wayne
- Charles Buffum as Director
- Ron Palombo as Assistant Director
- Wendy Appel as Script Girl
- Antonio Fargas as The Arab (first credited screen role)
- GeeGee Brown as Secretary
- Vince Amaker as Wall Man
- Al Green as Cowboy #1
- Chuck Ender as Cowboy #2
- Anthony Chisholm as Cowboy #3
- Walter Jones as Jim Keranga
- Khaula Bakr as Mrs. Keranga
- Melvia, Annette and Andrea Marshall as Little Kerangas
- Laura Greene as Mrs. Swope
- Ed Gordon as Mr. Victrola Cola
- Eric Krupnik as Mark Focus
- George Morgan as Mr. Token
- Abdul Hakeim as Bouncer
- Allan Arbus as Mr. Bad News
- Jesse McDonald as Young Militant
- C. Robert Scott as Militant #1
- Leopoldo Mandeville as Militant #2
- Vince Morgan Jr. as West Indian
- Al Browne as Moderate
- Marie Claire as Eugenie Ferlinger
- William H. Boesen as Bert
- Carol Farber as Secretary
- Cerves McNeill as Youngblood
- Carolyn Cardwell as Borman Six Girl
- Charles Green as Myron X / Rufus
- Pepi Hermine as President of The United States
- Ruth Hermine as First Lady
- Paul Storob as Secret Service Man
- Lawrence Wolf as Mr. Borman Six
- Jeff Lord as Mr. Bald
- Tom Boya as Mr. O'Dinga
- Major Cole as Idea Man #1
- David Butts as Idea Man #2
- Franklin Scott as Idea Man #3
- Paul Alladice as Idea Man #4
- Exit as Idea Man #5
- Ronnie Dyson as Face Off Boy
- Shelley Plimpton as Face Off Girl
- Elżbieta Czyżewska as Putney's Maid
- Paulette Marron as Air Conditioner Girl
- Delilah as Stewardess #1
- Carol Hobbs as Stewardess #2
- Birgitta as Stewardess #3
- Marco Helblim as Lucky Passenger
- Grania as Interviewer
- Peter Maloney as Putney's Chauffeur
- Larry Greenfield as Lead Reporter
- Marie Claire as Nun
- Lloyd Kagin as Billy Reilly
- Perry Gewirtz as Sonny Williams
- Herbert Kerr as Bodyguard #2
- Hal Schochet as President Mimeo's Bodyguard
- George Marshall as Mr. Executive
- Donald Lev as Poet
- William H. Boesen as Mr. Lunger
- Fred Hirshhorn as Mr. Bourbon
- Donahl Breitman as Mr. Ethereal Cereal
- Peter Benson as Mr. Jingle

== Production ==
In a DVD interview, Downey claims that Johnson had great difficulty memorizing and giving his lines during filming. Downey says he was unconcerned as he had developed a plan to dub his own voice over Johnson's.

Though the film is in black and white, the Truth and Soul commercials are in color.

== Release ==
=== Poster controversy ===
The theatrical release poster showed a raised hand with the image of a girl replacing the out-thrust middle finger. The Los Angeles Times declined to print the advertisement, and it was not reprinted by the Los Angeles Herald Examiner after initial complaints. In Chicago, the Tribune and Today refused to publish it, and it was pulled by the Sun-Times and Daily News, although they later published the advertisement without the girl as the middle finger. Roger Ebert was embarrassed by the Sun-Times' censorship.

=== Box office ===
Putney Swope opened on July 10, 1969, at Cinema II in New York City, grossing $32,281 in its first week. The film opened in Los Angeles on January 21, 1970, and set a house record of $16,000 at the 3 Penny Cinema in Chicago when it opened in February 1970; and, in Los Angeles, it was felt that the controversy boosted public interest.

=== Home media ===
The film was released on DVD on May 22, 2001, by Rhino Home Video. It received a Blu-ray on July 2, 2019, by Vinegar Syndrome.

== Reception ==
The film holds a 69% "Fresh" score with an average rating of 5.7/10 on review aggregator Rotten Tomatoes, based on reviews by 16 critics.

== Legacy ==
The Fishbone album Truth and Soul (1988) is named after the advertising agency in Putney Swope. Commenting on the cover design of the album, bassist Norwood Fisher said that, although the overall tone of the album was more serious than their previous releases, "We couldn’t completely lose our humor and decided to name the album after that movie."

The character Buck Swope from Paul Thomas Anderson's Boogie Nights (1997), portrayed by Don Cheadle, was named as a homage to this film. Downey also made a small cameo in Boogie Nights as the owner of a recording studio. The character Wing Soney, a Chinese businessman, was the inspiration for Cosmo, the Chinese man throwing firecrackers during the drug deal scene.

Anderson, Louis C.K. and Jim Jarmusch have cited Putney Swope as an inspiration for their approach to filmmaking.

The Beastie Boys song "Shadrach", from their 1989 album Paul's Boutique, mentions the film in the lyric "Music for all and not just one people, and now we're gonna bust with the Putney Swope sequel". Film dialogue is sampled on De La Soul's 1989 song "The Magic Number", as well as The Avalanches' 2016 album Wildflower.

A black-and-white photo of the film's poster, which Sloan band member Jay Ferguson saw in a book, inspired the "quick and photocopy looking" look of the album cover for the band's 1999 album Between the Bridges.

Putney Swope was preserved by the Academy Film Archive in 2019.
