= Lynn Kellogg =

American actress (1943–2020)

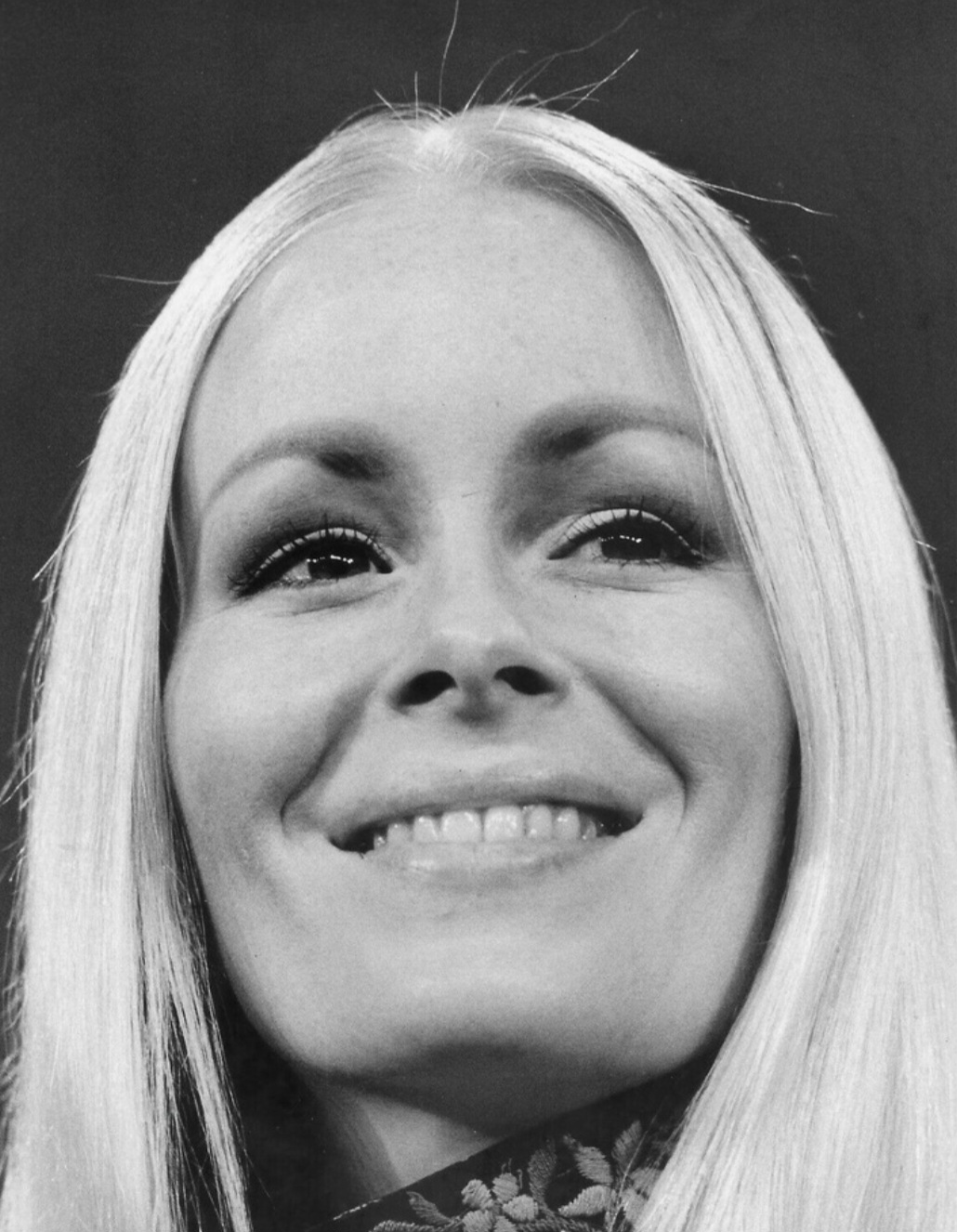
- Kellogg in 1968
- Born: April 2, 1943; Appleton, Wisconsin, U.S.
- Died: November 12, 2020 (aged 77); St. Louis, Missouri, U.S.
- Other name: Lynn Kellogg Simpers
- Education: University of Wisconsin
- Occupations: Actress, singer
- Spouse: John Simpers (m. 1995)

Lynn Kellogg (April 2, 1943 – November 12, 2020) was an American actress and singer.

== Biography ==
Kellogg was born on April 2, 1943, in Appleton, Wisconsin the daughter of Harry Burton Kellogg and Maxine (Goekes) Kellogg; she had a sister and two brothers. She attended the University of Wisconsin for one year. In 1964, she began a television career with an appearance on the series The Edge of Night.

She was perhaps best known for originating the role of Sheila in the original Broadway production of Hair in 1968. She also appeared in the 1969 film Charro!, with Elvis Presley, and had guest roles in 1970 on It Takes a Thief and Mission: Impossible.

In February 1972, Kellogg traveled to Vietnam with Sammy Davis Jr. and other performers where they performed a USO Show on several US bases in South Vietnam for the US military troops. She also had a career as a singer and guitarist and toured with Gordon Lightfoot and others.

She subsequently worked in children's television and was a performer of contemporary Christian music. Kellogg developed the educational series Animals, Animals, Animals, starring Hal Linden, which aired from 1976 to 1981 and won both Emmy and Peabody Awards. She returned to Appleton in 2002 and performed there locally, as well as in church.

=== Death ===
Kellogg died from complications of COVID-19 at a St. Louis hospital on November 12, 2020, during the COVID-19 pandemic in Missouri. She was 77. Her husband, John Simpers, said she was infected after attending a gathering in Branson, Missouri. At the time of her death, she also had a non-terminal form of leukemia, which had affected her vascular system.

== Filmography ==
- The Edge of Night
- The Beverly Hillbillies (1966) (Bird Watcher #6) (as Lynn Ketchum)
- Charro! (1969) (Marcie)
- It Takes a Thief (1968 TV series) (1970) (Gabriella)
- Mission: Impossible (1966 TV series) (1970) (Roxy)
