= Lamont Washington =

American singer, dancer, actor, and comedian

- Born: July 4, 1943; New York City, New York, U.S.
- Died: August 25, 1968 (aged 25); New York City, New York, U.S.
- Occupation(s): Singer, dancer, actor, comedian

Lamont Washington was an American singer, dancer, actor, and comedian known for his theater work, notably in the role of Hud in the original Broadway cast of Hair.

== Early life ==
Washington was born in Brooklyn and attended the High School of Performing Arts.

== Career ==
In 1964, Washington served as Sammy Davis Jr.'s understudy in the musical Golden Boy. Due to injuries that Davis sustained during the show's run, Washington performed the lead role on 32 occasions in 1965.

In April 1968, Washington originated the role of Hud in Broadway production of the musical Hair.

== Injury and death ==
On August 10, 1968, a fire broke out in Washington's apartment. Reports said the fire likely started in his mattress while he was sleeping. Washington had second- and third-degree burns over 80 percent of his body, as well as bone and organ damage from jumping from the third-floor apartment window onto the roof of a one-story building to escape the flames.

Washington died of his injuries on August 25, 1968.
