= Three-Five-Zero-Zero =

Anti-war song from the 1968 musical Hair

Song by Original Off-Broadway Cast of Hair

from the album Hair (Original Broadway Cast Recording)
- Released: 1967
- Genre: Rock
- Length: 3:09
- Label: RCA Victor
- Composer: Galt MacDermot
- Lyricists: James Rado and Gerome Ragni
- Producer: Andy Wiswell

"Three-Five-Zero-Zero" is an anti-war song, from the 1967 musical Hair, consisting of a montage of words and phrases similar to those of the 1966 Allen Ginsberg poem "Wichita Vortex Sutra". In the song, the phrases are combined to create images of the violence of military combat and suffering of the Vietnam War. In its first line, for instance, "Ripped open by metal explosion" is followed by "Caught in barbed wire/Fireball/Bullet shock".

The song begins with a slow, somber catalogue of violent images of death and dying, but its tone changes, as it becomes a manic dance number satirizing the American military's media attempts to gain support for the war by celebrating Vietnamese casualty statistics. At this point, the lyric begins a repeated refrain, "prisoners in Niggertown / it's a dirty little war", echoing Ginsberg's lines:

The war is over now —

Except for the souls

held prisoner in Niggertown

The cryptic line from the song that gives the song its title restates the line of the poem that attributes the phrase "Viet Cong losses leveling up three five zero zero per month" to General Maxwell Taylor and/or Robert McNamara in what it calls "Front page testimony February '66".

On the soundtrack, the song appears as a combined track with the song "What a Piece of Work Is Man", a recitation of the "What a piece of work is a man" speech from William Shakespeare's Hamlet.

== See also ==
- List of anti-war songs
