= Sally Eaton =

American actress (born 1947)

- Born: April 6, 1947 (age 78); Great Lakes, Illinois, United States
- Occupation(s): Stage actress, singer, priestess, liturgist
- Spouse: Isaac Bonewits (1983-1986)

Sally Eaton (born April 6, 1947) is an American Wiccan high priestess, liturgist, singer and actress, whose credits include creating and playing the role of Jeannie in the Broadway and off-Broadway stage productions of the musical Hair, and acting in Doric Wilson's plays Now She Dances! and Street Theater.

== Life and career ==
Eaton was born in Illinois. She is a professional actress and singer, best known for her performances in the original Broadway cast of the musical Hair and its original cast album; she later sang the blues professionally. As a member of Doric Wilson's theater company TOSOS (The Other Side of Silence) in the 1970s, she acted in Wilson's plays Now She Dances! and Street Theater.

After her time on Broadway, in the mid-1970s Eaton migrated to the San Francisco Bay Area, becoming a third degree priestess in New Reformed Orthodox Order of the Golden Dawn. She practiced in the West Coast craft tradition and the California revival of Ordo Templi Orientis.

She contributed to an early Ar nDraiocht Fein (ADF) ritual and published the music and lyrics of the songs on the album Avalon is Rising! Her magical background ranges from Golden Dawn and Ordo Templi Orientis material to Wiccan and Druidic styles, and she has presented lectures, rituals and performances at Neo-Pagan events.

== Discography ==
=== Albums ===
- Hair (Original Off-Broadway Cast Recording) (RCA 1967)
- Hair: The American Tribal Love Rock Musical - The Broadway cast album (RCA 1968)
- Farewell American Tour (Paramount Records PAS-5021 1971)
- Starwood Memories II (ACE Tapes 1988)
- Another Country - Another Country (Bill Ring, Sally Eaton & Peter Pasco)

=== Singles ===
- "Breathin is Believin" / "I Can Afford" (Paramount Records)
- "Charlotte's in Trouble" / "I Don't Want to Need You Anymore" (Paramount Records)
- "Once Before You Go" / "Long Time Lover" (Paramount Records)
