= Cheryl Barnes =

American singer and actress (born 1951)

- Born: c. 1951 (age 74–75); Westfield, New Jersey, U.S.
- Occupations: Singer, actress

Cheryl Barnes (b. c. 1951 in Westfield, New Jersey) is an American singer and actress. She is best known for her role in Miloš Forman's 1979 film adaptation of Hair, where she played the mother of Hud's little son.

== Biography ==
Raised in Westfield, New Jersey, Barnes graduated from Westfield High School. Her first professional experience as a singer came while a student at Union County College, when she joined the rock band Eve's Garden. With that band, she played a number of dates as the opening act for groups such as the Classics IV, The Vagrants (with Leslie West), and Ten Wheel Drive.

Barnes performed in Leonard Bernstein's Mass and on Broadway in The Last Sweet Days of Isaac, Godspell, and Jesus Christ Superstar. She portrayed Dina, the handmaiden, in Doug Henning's The Magic Show. Along with Laura Branigan, Cheryl sang backing vocals for Leonard Cohen on a European tour in 1976.

Barnes auditioned for Hair at an open casting call. She had no agent and was working as a chambermaid in a motel in Martha's Vineyard. Barnes' song in Hair, "Easy to Be Hard", was captured in one take, and this is the take seen in its entirety in the film. Her later scene in the desert outside the army base was filmed in Barstow, California, where she remained after production. Forman talked her into coming to New York City for a few months, as he did not want to see such talent go to waste, but Barnes soon returned to Barstow, where she worked as a piano teacher. She remained friends with Forman and accompanied him to Prague in 1983, where he was shooting the film Amadeus.

Barnes sang the song "Love and Passion" (music by Giorgio Moroder and lyrics by Paul Schrader) for the soundtrack of the 1980 film American Gigolo.
