= What a piece of work is a man =

Quote from Hamlet

"What a piece of work is a man!" is a phrase within a monologue by Prince Hamlet in William Shakespeare's play Hamlet. Hamlet is reflecting, at first admiringly, and then despairingly, on the human condition.

== The speech ==
The monologue, spoken in the play by Prince Hamlet to Rosencrantz and Guildenstern in Act II, Scene 2, follows in its entirety. Rather than appearing in blank verse, the typical mode of composition of Shakespeare's plays, the speech appears in straight prose:

I will tell you why; so shall my anticipation prevent your discovery, and your secrecy to the King and queene: moult no feather. I have of late, (but wherefore I know not) lost all my mirth, forgone all custom of exercises; and indeed, it goes so heavily with my disposition; that this goodly frame the earth, seems to me a sterile promontory; this most excellent canopy the air, look you, this brave o'er hanging firmament, this majestical roof, fretted with golden fire: why, it appeareth no other thing to me, than a foul and pestilent congregation of vapours. What a piece of work is a man, How noble in reason, how infinite in faculty, In form and moving how express and admirable, In action how like an Angel, In apprehension how like a god, The beauty of the world, The paragon of animals. And yet to me, what is this quintessence of dust? Man delights not me; no, nor Woman neither; though by your smiling you seem to say so.

== Differences between texts ==
The speech was fully omitted from Nicholas Ling's 1603 First Quarto, which reads simply:

Yes faith, this great world you see contents me not,
No nor the spangled heauens, nor earth, nor sea,
No nor Man that is so glorious a creature,
Contents not me, no nor woman too, though you laugh.

This version has been argued to have been a bad quarto, a tourbook copy, or an initial draft. By the 1604 Second Quarto, the speech is essentially present but punctuated differently:

What piece of work is a man, how noble in reason,
how infinite in faculties, in form and moving,
how express and admirable in action, how like an angel in apprehension,
how like a god!

Then, by the 1623 First Folio, it appeared as:

What a piece of worke is a man! how Noble in
Reason? how infinite in faculty? in forme and mouing
how expresse and admirable? in Action, how like an Angel?
in apprehension, how like a God? ...

J. Dover Wilson, in his notes in the New Shakespeare edition, observed that the Folio text "involves two grave difficulties", namely that according to Elizabethan thought angels could apprehend but not act, making "in action how like an angel" nonsensical, and that "express" (which as an adjective means "direct and purposive") makes sense applied to "action", but goes very awkwardly with "form and moving".

These difficulties are remedied if we read it thus:

What a piece of worke is a man! how Noble in
Reason? how infinite in faculty, in forme, and mouing
how expresse and admirable in Action, how like an Angel
in apprehension, how like a God?

== Sources ==
A source well known to Shakespeare is Psalm 8, especially verse 5: "You have made [humans] a little lower than the heavenly beings and crowned them with glory and honor."

Scholars have pointed out this section's similarities to lines written by Montaigne:

Qui luy a persuadé que ce branle admirable de la voute celeste, la lumiere eternelle de ces flambeaux roulans si fierement sur sa teste, les mouvemens espouventables de ceste mer infinie, soyent establis et se continuent tant de siecles, pour sa commodité et pour son service ? Est-il possible de rien imaginer si ridicule, que ceste miserable et chetive creature, qui n’est pas seulement maistresse de soy, exposée aux offences de toutes choses, se die maistresse et emperiere de l’univers?

Who have persuaded [man] that this admirable moving of heavens vaults, that the eternal light of these lampes so fiercely rowling over his head, that the horror-moving and continuall motion of this infinite vaste ocean were established, and continue so many ages for his commoditie and service? Is it possible to imagine so ridiculous as this miserable and wretched creature, which is not so much as master of himselfe, exposed and subject to offences of all things, and yet dareth call himself Master and Emperor.

However, rather than being a direct influence on Shakespeare, Montaigne may have merely been reacting to the same general atmosphere of the time, making the source of these lines one of context rather than direct influence.

== See also ==
- List of idioms attributed to Shakespeare
