= Shelley Plimpton =

American actress (born 1947)

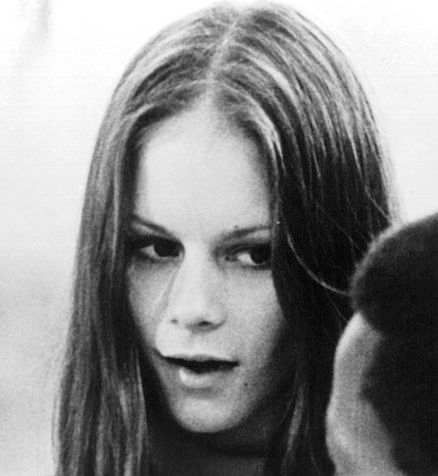
- Plimpton in Putney Swope (1969)
- Born: February 27, 1947 (age 79); Roseburg, Oregon, U.S.
- Education: Washington Irving High School (New York City)
- Occupations: Actress, singer
- Years active: 1969–1975, 1986
- Spouses: Steve Curry (m. 1970; div. 1971) Daniel J. Sullivan (m. 1990; div. 1997)
- Children: Martha Plimpton

Shelley Plimpton (born February 27, 1947) is an American former actress and Broadway performer. She is perhaps best known for originating the role of Crissy in the off-Broadway production of Hair, a role she resumed when the production moved to Broadway in 1968. She is the mother of actress Martha Plimpton.

== Early life ==
Plimpton was born and raised in Roseburg, Oregon, to an Episcopalian family. Her father, William Sherman Plimpton, a native of Portland and graduate of the University of Washington, operated an auto parts store in Roseburg, while her mother worked as a medical researcher. She had one brother, Sherman Jr. She is a "very distant" cousin of writer George Plimpton. Her parents divorced when she was five years old, and her father died of cancer, aged 50, when Plimpton was twelve years old.

When Plimpton was fourteen, she relocated with her mother from Roseburg to New York City, where her mother took a job working as a researcher for a Manhattan fertility doctor. She and her mother moved into an apartment in Greenwich Village, and Plimpton attended Washington Irving High School in Gramercy Park, Manhattan. After graduating, she worked as a cashier in a nightclub.

== Career ==
Plimpton's acting career spanned from the mid-1960s to the late-1980s. She created the role of "Crissy" in the original 1967 Off-Broadway production of Hair, and continued the role as a member of the original Broadway cast when the production moved to Broadway in 1968.In both productions, she sang the song "Frank Mills". Plimpton took a leave of absence from Hair to appear in Arlo Guthrie's film Alice's Restaurant, playing a 14-year-old who offers herself to Arlo, saying that she has already "made it" with several other musicians and "you'll probably be an album some day." He gently rejects her advances, giving her his bandanna as a souvenir and saying simply, "I just don't want to catch your cold". Plimpton also appeared in the 1969 Robert Downey Sr., film Putney Swope opposite Ronnie Dyson as one half of an interracial college couple ("It started last weekend at the Yale-Howard game") in a satire of a pimple cream TV spot. In 1971, Plimpton appeared in Jim McBride's post-apocalyptic drama film, Glen and Randa, in which she portrays Randa, a young woman part of a group of scavengers who survived a nuclear apocalypse many years prior and sets off with her lover Glen (Steve Curry) to discover a ravaged world and to search for a city which Glen has seen in comic books. She worked with McBride once again when she was cast in the 1974 comedy film Hot Times. Her final film role was in the 1975 film Foreplay.

Plimpton made a brief return to acting in 1986 when she made a guest appearance on the short-lived television sitcom Throb, which starred Diana Canova, Paul Walker and Jane Leeves, after which she retired from acting.

== Personal life ==
In 1970, Plimpton gave birth to Martha Plimpton (whose father is Keith Carradine) in New York City, where she raised her in Manhattan's Upper West Side. From 1970 to 1971, Plimpton was married to Steve Curry. From 1990 to 1997, she was married to theatre director Daniel J. Sullivan (who worked as an assistant director on Hair, and later directed the Seattle Repertory Theater).

In 2002, it was reported that Plimpton was living in Seattle, Washington, working a day job at a gift center. In September 2017, Vanity Fair reported that she resided in Oregon.

== Filmography ==
Title	Year	Role	Notes
Putney Swope	1969	Face Off Girl	Directed by Robert Downey Sr.
Alice's Restaurant	1969	Reenie	Directed by Arthur Penn
Replay	1970	Unnamed role	Short film - directed by Robert Deubel
Glen and Randa	1971	Randa	Directed by Jim McBride
Hot Times	1974	Patsy	Directed by Jim McBride
Foreplay	1975	First Girl	Directed by John G. Avildsen, Bruce Malmuth, Robert McCarthy & Ralph Rosenblum
Throb	1986	Tammy	Season 1, Episode 3 – "Getting to Know You"

== Stage credits ==
Title	Year	Role	Notes
Hair	1968–72	Crissy	Broadway (The Biltmore Theatre)
