= James Rado =

American dramatist (1932–2022)

- Born: James Alexander Radomski; January 23, 1932; Los Angeles, California, U.S.
- Died: June 21, 2022 (aged 90); New York City, U.S.
- Education: University of Maryland, College Park; The Catholic University of America
- Occupations: Actor; playwright; director; writer; composer
- Notable work: Hair

James Alexander Radomski (January 23, 1932 – June 21, 2022), known professionally as James Rado, was an American actor, playwright, director, and composer, best known as the co-author, along with Gerome Ragni, of the 1967 musical Hair. He and Ragni won for Best Musical Theater Album at the 11th Annual Grammy Awards and were nominated for the 1969 Tony Award for Best Musical.

== Early life ==
Rado was born to Alexander and Blanche (Bukowski) Radomski on January 23, 1932, in Los Angeles and was raised in Irondequoit, New York, and Washington, D.C. In college, Rado majored in Speech and Drama and began writing songs. He co-authored two musical shows at the University of Maryland, Interlude and Interlude II. After graduation, followed by two years in the U.S. Navy, he returned to school in Washington, D.C., for graduate work at The Catholic University of America, where he co-authored a musical revue called Cross Your Fingers. He wrote the lyrics and music for all of his early songs.

He then moved to New York City, where he studied acting with Lee Strasberg and also wrote pop songs which he recorded with his own band, James Alexander and the Argyles. Rado's first Broadway show was Marathon '33 in 1963. In 1966, Rado played Richard Lionheart in the original Broadway production of The Lion in Winter by James Goldman, starring Robert Preston and Rosemary Harris.

He met Gerome Ragni in 1964, when they acted together in the off-Broadway play Hang Down Your Head and Die. Later, both Rado and Ragni were cast in the roles of Tom and Tolan in the Chicago company of Mike Nichols' production of The Knack, by Ann Jellicoe.

== Hair ==
Rado and Ragni became friends and began writing Hair together in late 1964. Rado explained, "We were great friends. It was a passionate kind of relationship that we directed into creativity, into writing, into creating this piece. We put the drama between us on stage." He recalled, "There was so much excitement in the streets and the parks and the hippie areas, and we thought if we could transmit this excitement to the stage it would be wonderful.... We hung out with them and went to their Be-Ins [and] let our hair grow." Hair premiered off-Broadway in October 1967 and opened on Broadway in April 1968. It became a sensation, running for 1,750 performances and spawning numerous productions around the world and a 1979 film adaptation. Some of the songs from its score became Top 10 hits, and numerous albums of the songs have been released. The 2009 Broadway revival earned the Tony Award for Best Revival and also opened in London's West End.

Although he did not play the part of Claude when the show premiered Off-Broadway, Rado originated the role of Claude on Broadway, performing opposite Ragni as Berger. He also played Claude in the later Los Angeles production. The main characters of Claude and Berger were autobiographical to a degree, with Rado's Claude being the pensive romantic. In a 2008 interview with The Advocate, Rado publicly described himself for the first time as omnisexual and spoke openly of being Ragni's lover.

== After Hair ==
After the success of Hair, Rado and Ragni went their separate ways for a period of time in the early 1970s.

=== Rainbow ===
While Ragni and Hair composer Galt MacDermot collaborated on Dude, Rado wrote a musical titled The Rainbow Rainbeam Radio Roadshow, or Rainbow for short, collaborating on the book with his brother Ted Rado and contributing his own music and lyrics. Rainbow opened Off-Broadway at the Orpheum Theater in December 1972. The musical is a sequel of sorts to Hair with a character called Man who was killed in the Vietnam War and who now lives in Rainbow land. Clive Barnes gave it a positive review in The New York Times, writing "[Rainbow] is joyous and life-assertive. It is the first musical to derive from Hair that really seems to have the confidence of a new creation about it, largely derived from James Rado's sweet and fresh music and lyrics." Since then, Rainbow has been revised numerous times, in some developments becoming more explicitly a sequel to Hair, as when it became Rainbow: The Ghost of Vietnam in the late 1990s, and in others becoming more abstract as in one version, titled Billy Earth: The New Rainbow and later as American Soldier: The White Haunted House.

The latest version of the show, titled Supersoldier, was presented in a staged reading on October 14, 2013, by actor Sam Underwood's Fundamental Theater Project in collaboration with the New York Theatre Barn at the Manhattan Movement and Arts Center. The reading was directed by Joe Barros and featured Tyson Jennette, Debbie Andrews, and Luis Villabon. Rado previously collaborated with the Fundamental Theater Project in 2010, playing the role of Hamlet's Ghost in the company's benefit reading of Hamlet in which Alec Baldwin, Kate Mulgrew, and Fundamental Theater Project Co-Artistic Director Sam Underwood also starred.

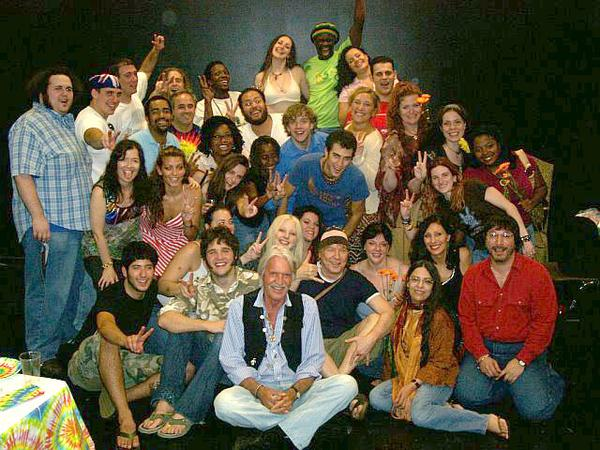
Rado, in black T-shirt and cap, with producer Michael Butler (front) and a 2006 Hair cast in Red Bank, New Jersey

=== Sun ===
In 1974, Rado reunited with Ragni to co-write Sun (Audio Movie), a show with music by Steve Margoshes based on a play by New York writer Joyce Greller with themes about pollution and the environment. The musical (then titled YMCA) was initially staged for backers in 1976, in a workshop directed by John Vaccaro, with appearances by Ruby Lynn Reyner and Annie-Joe Edwards. Sun was presented at the Howl! Arts Project in 2011. Another version of Sun, written with a score by Hair collaborator Galt MacDermot, was presented in concert form in 1998.

=== Other shows ===
Rado and Ragni would later write another musical together, again with Margoshes, titled Jack Sound and His Dog Star Blowing His Final Trumpet on the Day of Doom. The show ran at La MaMa in the summer of 1978.

== Later years ==
Following Ragni's death in 1991, Rado was active in developing new productions of Hair, including the 11-city 1994 national tour that he directed, and the 2006 CanStage production in Toronto.

Since 2011, Rado was creative consultant for the futuristic rock musical Barcode, written and workshopped at a downtown Manhattan rock club in 2012 by the members of New York indie band Gladshot, and premiered in August 2013 at the New York International Fringe Festival. On December 3, 2011, Rado performed songs from Barcode at Occupy Wall Street's Occupy Broadway.

Rado died on June 21, 2022, at a hospital in Manhattan from cardiorespiratory arrest at the age of 90.
