= The Best of 3 Dog Night =

Greatest hits album by Three Dog Night
- Released: 1982
- Recorded: 1968–1973
- Genre: Pop; rock
- Length: 67:18
- Label: MCA
- Producer: Richard Podolor; Gabriel Mekler; Jimmy Ienner
- Compiler: Vince Cosgrave

Three Dog Night chronology
American Pastime (1976)	The Best of 3 Dog Night (1982)	It's a Jungle (1983)

The Best of 3 Dog Night is the fifteenth album by the American rock band, Three Dog Night and is a double album released in 1982. It was certified Gold by the RIAA on May 1, 1996.

Seven of these titles landed on the Billboard Adult contemporary chart when originally released and all 20 hit the Hot 100.

== Critical reception ==
Professional ratings
Review scores
Source	Rating
AllMusic	4.5/5 stars

Stephen Thomas Erlewine of AllMusic writes, "There isn't anything major missing, and while some of the non-singles material isn't particularly strong, there are enough worthwhile moments to make this a fairly consistent, enjoyable listen, in addition to being the one Three Dog Night album most fans will need."

== Track listing ==
Side one
No.	Title	Writer(s)	Original album	Length
1.	"Joy to the World"	Hoyt Axton	Naturally (1970)	3:32
2.	"Easy to Be Hard"	Galt MacDermot; James Rado; Gerome Ragni	Suitable for Framing (1969)	3:09
3.	"The Family of Man"	Jack Conrad; Paul Williams	Harmony (1971)	3:05
4.	"Sure As I'm Sittin' Here"	John Hiatt	Hard Labor (1974)	3:05
5.	"An Old Fashioned Love Song"	Paul Williams	Harmony	3:20

Side two
No.	Title	Writer(s)	Original album	Length
1.	"Mama Told Me (Not to Come)"	Randy Newman	It Ain't Easy (1970)	3:14
2.	"Try a Little Tenderness"	Jimmy Campbell; Reginald Connelly; Harry M. Woods	Three Dog Night (1969)	4:06
3.	"Shambala"	Daniel Moore	Cyan (1973)	3:21
4.	"Let Me Serenade You"	John Finely	Cyan	3:00
5.	"Never Been to Spain"	Hoyt Axton	Harmony	3:40

Side three
No.	Title	Writer(s)	Original album	Length
1.	"Black and White"	David I. Arkin; Earl Robinson	Seven Separate Fools (1972)	3:42
2.	"Pieces of April"	Dave Loggins	Seven Separate Fools	4:08
3.	"Liar"	Russ Ballard	Naturally	3:01
4.	"Out in the Country"	Roger Nichols; Paul Williams	It Ain't Easy	3:05
5.	"The Show Must Go On"	David Courtney; Leo Sayer	Hard Labor	3:26

Side four
No.	Title	Writer(s)	Original album	Length
1.	"Eli's Coming"	Laura Nyro	Suitable For Framing	2:38
2.	"One Man Band"	Billy Fox; January Tyme; Tommy Kaye	Naturally	2:48
3.	"One"	Harry Nilsson		3:01
4.	"Play Something Sweet (Brickyard Blues)"	Allen Toussaint	Hard Labor	4:46
5.	"Celebrate"	Gary Bonner; Alan Gordon	Suitable For Framing	3:11
Total length:				67:18

- The CD release follows the same track list.

== Personnel ==
- Mike Allsup - guitar
- Jimmy Greenspoon - keyboard
- Danny Hutton - vocals
- Skip Konte - keyboard
- Chuck Negron - vocals
- Jack Ryland - bass guitar
- Joe Schermie - bass guitar
- Floyd Sneed - percussion, drums
- Cory Wells - vocals

== Production ==
- Producers: Richard Podolor, Gabriel Mekler, Jimmy Ienner
- Compilation: Vince Cosgrave
- Art direction: Vartan
- Design: Jay Vigon
- Artwork: Jay Vigon

== Certifications ==
Region	Certification	Certified units/sales
United States (RIAA)	Gold	500,000^{^}
^{^} Shipments figures based on certification alone.
