= Three Dog Night discography =

Discography

- Studio albums: 12
- Live albums: 4
- Compilation albums: 7
- Singles: 26

Three Dog Night's original recordings were released by ABC Dunhill Records, except for 1983's It's a Jungle, which was released by Passport. In the mid-1970s, executives at ABC Dunhill discarded their multi-track recordings and mono masters to save storage space in a cost-cutting measure. As a result, all re-issues on CD were remastered using album masters.

The group scored 11 top ten hits on the Billboard Hot 100 chart, including three that hit number one: "Joy to the World", "Mama Told Me Not to Come" and "Black and White". "Joy to the World" was the top song on the Billboard Year-End Hot 100 singles of 1971 and in Canada's RPM magazine. In Canada they had 15 in the Top 10. Seven of the group's albums were certified gold by the RIAA and their debut studio album, Three Dog Night (1968), was certified platinum.

== Albums ==
=== Studio albums ===
List of studio albums, with selected chart positions and certifications
Title	Album details	Peak chart positions			Certifications
Title	Album details	US	AUS	CAN	Certifications
Three Dog Night	Released: October 16, 1968; Label: Dunhill (DS 50048); Format: stereo LP/8-track/cassette/CD	11	—	17	RIAA: Platinum
Suitable for Framing	Released: June 11, 1969; Label: Dunhill (DS 50058); Format: stereo LP/8-track/cassette/CD	16	—	15	RIAA: Gold
It Ain't Easy	Released: March 31, 1970; Label: Dunhill (DS 50078); Format: stereo LP/8-track/cassette/CD	8	—	5	RIAA: Gold
Naturally	Released: November 18, 1970; Label: Dunhill (DSX 50088); Format: stereo LP/8-track/cassette/CD	14	—	19	RIAA: Gold
Harmony	Released: September 30, 1971; Label: Dunhill (DSX 50108); Format: stereo LP/8-track/cassette/CD	8	32	11	RIAA: Gold
Seven Separate Fools	Released: July 1972; Label: Dunhill (DSD 50118); Format: stereo LP/8-track/cassette/CD	6	21	7	RIAA: Gold
Cyan	Released: October 9, 1973; Label: Dunhill (DSX/DHM 50158/DSX 550158); Format: stereo LP/8-track/cassette/CD	26	—	8	RIAA: Gold
Hard Labor	Released: March 6, 1974; Label: Dunhill (DSD 50168); Format: stereo LP/8-track/cassette/CD	20	61	16	RIAA: Gold
Coming Down Your Way	Released: May 1, 1975; Label: ABC (ABCD 888); Format: stereo LP/8-track/cassette	70	—	27	
American Pastime	Released: March 1976; Label: ABC (ABCD 928); Format: stereo LP/8-track/cassette	123	—	—	
It's a Jungle	Released: May 1983; Label: Passport (PB 5001); Format: stereo LP/cassette	210	—	—	
Three Dog Night with the London Symphony Orchestra	Released: May 21, 2002; Label: Image (1378); Format: CD	—	—	—	
"—" denotes releases that did not chart.

As of 2021, Three Dog Night has confirmed they are working on their next album, which will be called The Road Ahead. It currently does not have a release date.

=== Live albums ===
List of live albums, with selected chart positions and certifications
Title	Album details	Peak chart positions		Certifications
Title	Album details	US	CAN	Certifications
Captured Live at the Forum	Released: October 16, 1969; Label: Dunhill (DS 50068); Format: stereo LP/8-track/cassette/CD	6	4	RIAA: Gold
Around the World with Three Dog Night	Released: February 13, 1973; Label: Dunhill (DSY 50138); Format: stereo LP/8-track/cassette	18	21	RIAA: Gold
Three Dog Night: Live	Released: 1988; Label: Universal Special Products; Format: cassette	—	—	
Super Hits Live	Released: August 28, 2007; Label: Sony BMG (702945); Format: CD	—	—	
Three Dog Night: Greatest Hits Live	Released: August 26, 2008; Label: Shout Factory (B001CITRCQ); Format: CD	—	—	
"—" denotes releases that did not chart.

=== Compilation albums ===
List of compilation albums, with selected chart positions and certifications
Title	Album details	Peak chart positions			Certifications
Title	Album details	US	AUS	CAN	Certifications
Golden Bisquits	Released: February 1971; Label: Dunhill (DSX 50098); Format: stereo LP/8-track/cassette	5	37	8	RIAA: Gold
Joy to the World: Their Greatest Hits	Released: November 1974; Label: Dunhill (DSD 50178); Format: stereo LP/8-track/cassette/CD	15	—	4	RIAA: Gold
The Best of 3 Dog Night	Released: 1982; Label: MCA (6018); Format: stereo LP/cassette/CD	—	—	—	RIAA: Gold
Celebrate: The Three Dog Night Story, 1965–1975	Released: December 7, 1993; Label: MCA (MCAD/C2-10956); Format: double CD/double Cassette	—	—	—	
20th Century Masters – The Millennium Collection: The Best of Three Dog Night	Released: October 19, 1999; Label: MCA (MCAD-12073); Format: Cassette/CD	109	—	—	RIAA: Platinum
The Complete Hit Singles	Released: May 25, 2004; Label: Geffen (B0001779-02); Format: CD	178	—	—	
35th Anniversary Hits Collection	Released: October 19, 2004; Label: Compendia (5778); Format: CD	—	—	—	
"—" denotes releases that did not chart.

== Singles ==
List of singles, with selected chart positions and certifications, showing year released and album name
Year	Title	Peak chart positions										Certifications	Album
Year	Title	US	US AC	AT	CAN	GE	NL	NZ	SA	UK	AU	Certifications	Album
1968	"Nobody"	116	—	—	—	—	—	—	—	—	—		Three Dog Night
1969	"Try a Little Tenderness"	29	—	—	19	—	—	—	—	—	—		Three Dog Night
1969	"One"	5	—	—	4	—	—	16	—	—	39	RIAA: Gold	Three Dog Night
1969	"Easy to Be Hard"	4	—	—	2	—	—	—	—	—	—		Suitable for Framing
1969	"Eli's Coming"	10	—	—	4	—	—	14	—	—	—		Suitable for Framing
1970	"Celebrate"	15	—	—	8	—	—	—	—	—	—		Suitable for Framing
1970	"Mama Told Me Not to Come"	1	—	—	2	12	14	13	10	3	10	RIAA: Gold	It Ain't Easy
1970	"Out in the Country"	15	11	—	9	—	—	—	—	—	85		It Ain't Easy
1970	"One Man Band"	19	—	—	6	—	—	—	—	—	—		Naturally
1971	"Joy to the World"	1	—	—	1	17	25	12	1	24	8	RIAA: Gold	Naturally
1971	"Liar"	7	—	—	4	—	—	19	—	—	72		Naturally
1971	"An Old Fashioned Love Song"	4	1	—	2	—	—	3	—	—	16	RIAA: Gold	Harmony
1971	"Never Been to Spain"	5	18	—	3	—	—	12	—	—	34		Harmony
1972	"The Family of Man"	12	27	—	5	38	—	—	—	—	60		Harmony
1972	"Black and White"	1	1	8	1	24	—	1	—	—	21	RIAA: Gold	Seven Separate Fools
1972	"Pieces of April"	19	6	—	13	—	—	12	—	—	—		Seven Separate Fools
1973	"Shambala"	3	3	17	4	38	—	1	13	—	53	RIAA: Gold	Cyan
1973	"Let Me Serenade You"	17	—	—	11	—	—	—	—	—	—		Cyan
1974	"The Show Must Go On"	4	—	—	2	12	6	—	—	—	—	RIAA: Gold	Hard Labor
1974	"Sure As I'm Sittin' Here"	16	—	—	18	—	—	—	—	—	—		Hard Labor
1974	"Play Something Sweet (Brickyard Blues)"	33	—	—	25	—	—	—	—	—	—		Hard Labor
1975	"Til the World Ends"	32	11	—	26	—	—	—	—	—	—		Coming Down Your Way
1976	"Everybody Is a Masterpiece"	—	44	—	—	—	—	—	—	—	—		American Pastime
1983	"It's a Jungle Out There"	—	—	—	—	—	—	—	—	—	—		It's a Jungle
2009	"Heart of Blues"	—	—	—	—	—	—	—	—	—	—		non-album single
