= The Complete Hit Singles =

Compilation album by Three Dog Night
- Released: May 25, 2004
- Genre: Pop; rock
- Length: 74:28
- Label: Geffen
- Producer: Mike Ragogna

Three Dog Night chronology
20th Century Masters – The Millennium Collection: The Best of Three Dog Night (2000)	The Complete Hit Singles (2004)	35th Anniversary Hits Collection (2004)

The Complete Hit Singles is a compilation album by Three Dog Night. It was released on May 25, 2004 by Geffen Records.

While eight of these titles landed on the Billboard Adult contemporary chart when originally released, all twenty-one hit the Hot 100. Peaking at No. 1 on the Hot 100 were "Joy to the World," "Mama Told Me (Not to Come)" and "Black and White." On the Adult contemporary charts, the No. 1s were "Black & White" and "An Old Fashioned Love Song." To date this is the only compilation to contain all of the band's top 40 hits. There were eleven top 10s, seven of them reaching gold status. Three Dog Night disbanded in 1977.

== Critical reception ==
Professional ratings
Review scores
Source	Rating
AllMusic	4.5/5 stars

Tim Sendra of AllMusic writes, "the songs collected here play like the soundtrack to the '70s" and "these songs are about as good as early-'70s pop gets."

== Track listing ==
No.	Title	Writer(s)	Original album	Length
1.	"One"	Harry Nilsson	Three Dog Night (1968)	3:04
2.	"Try a Little Tenderness"	Jimmy Campbell; Reginald Connelly; Harry M. Woods	Three Dog Night	4:24
3.	"Easy to Be Hard"	Galt MacDermot; James Rado; Gerome Ragni	Suitable for Framing (1969)	3:13
4.	"Eli's Coming"	Laura Nyro	Suitable For Framing	2:47
5.	"Celebrate"	Gary Bonner; Alan Gordon	Suitable For Framing	3:01
6.	"Mama Told Me (Not to Come)"	Randy Newman	It Ain't Easy (1970)	3:19
7.	"Out in the Country"	Roger Nichols; Paul Williams	It Ain't Easy	3:08
8.	"One Man Band"	Billy Fox; January Tyme; Tommy Kaye	Naturally (1970)	2:52
9.	"Joy to the World"	Hoyt Axton	Naturally	3:15
10.	"Liar"	Russ Ballard	Naturally	3:19
11.	"An Old Fashioned Love Song"	Paul Williams	Harmony (1971)	3:47
12.	"Never Been to Spain"	Hoyt Axton	Harmony	3:44
13.	"Family of Man"	Jack Conrad; Paul Williams	Harmony	3:26
14.	"Black & White"	David I. Arkin; Earl Robinson	Seven Separate Fools (1972)	3:24
15.	"Pieces of April"	Dave Loggins	Seven Separate Fools	4:13
16.	"Shambala"	Daniel Moore	Cyan (1973)	3:25
17.	"Let Me Serenade You"	John Finely	Cyan	3:15
18.	"The Show Must Go On"	David Courtney; Leo Sayer	Hard Labor (1974)	3:45
19.	"Sure As I'm Sittin' Here"	John Hiatt	Hard Labor	4:47
20.	"Play Something Sweet (Brickyard Blues)"	Allen Toussaint	Hard Labor	4:49
21.	"'Til the World Ends"	Dave Loggins	Coming Down Your Way (1975)	3:31
Total length:				74:28

== Musicians ==
=== Three Dog Night ===
- Cory Wells – Vocals
- Chuck Negron – Vocals
- Danny Hutton – Vocals
- Michael Allsup – Guitars
- Jimmy Greenspoon – Keyboards
- Floyd Sneed – Drums, Percussion
- Skip Konte – Keyboards (1974-1976)
- Jack Ryland – Bass (1973-1975)
- Joe Schermie – Bass (1968-1973)

=== Additional musicians ===
"Celebrate"

- Walter Parazaider – Saxophone
- James Pankow – Trombone
- Lee Loughnane – Trumpet

"Never Been To Spain"

- Rusty Young - pedal steel

"Pieces Of April"

- Patrick Sullivan – Cello

"Let Me Serenade You"

- Gordon DeWitty – Organ

"Til The World Ends"

- Jimmy Haskell – Strings Arranged By
- Ron Stockert – Electric Piano (Fender Rhodes)
- Mickey McMeel – Percussion

== Production ==
- Mastered by Erick Labson
- Producer – Gabriel Mekler (tracks 1 to 5)
- Producer – Jimmy Ienner (tracks 18 to 21)
- Producer – Richard Podolor (tracks 6 to 17)
- Art Direction – Vartan Kurjian
- Compilation Producer – Mike Ragogna
- Production Design – Glenn Barry
- Engineer – Bill Cooper (tracks 1 to 17)
- Engineer – Richard Podolor (tracks 1 to 5)
- Product Manager – Adam Starr
- Product Manager – Kelly Martinez
- Production Manager – Adam Abrams

Track information and credits adapted from AllMusic, and verified from the album's liner notes.

== Charts ==
Chart (2004)	Peak position
US Billboard 200	178
