= Celebrate: The Three Dog Night Story, 1965–1975 =

Greatest hits album by Three Dog Night
- Released: December 7, 1993
- Genre: Pop; rock
- Length: 2:26:49
- Label: MCA
- Producer: Danny Hutton; Jimmy Ienner; Gabriel Mekler; Richard Podolor; Three Dog Night; Brian Wilson; Tom Wilson

Three Dog Night chronology
It's a Jungle (1983)	Celebrate: The Three Dog Night Story, 1965–1975 (1993)	20th Century Masters – The Millennium Collection: The Best of Three Dog Night (2000)

Professional ratings
Review scores
Source	Rating
AllMusic	4/5 stars

Celebrate: The Three Dog Night Story, 1965–1975 is a two-CD anthology of Three Dog Night recordings released in 1993 which includes some pre-Three Dog Night material from co-lead singers Danny Hutton and Cory Wells (none from Chuck Negron), as well as an unreleased track "Time to Get Alone", penned and produced by Brian Wilson from the band's brief "Redwood" incarnation. It covers all of the band's singles, as well as some album tracks, in the band's career.

== Track listing ==
Disc 1:

1. "Roses and Rainbows" (Danny Hutton) – 2:11 Performed by Danny Hutton
2. "Funny How Love Can Be" (John Carter, Ken Lewis) – 2:36 Performed by Danny Hutton
3. "Sinner Man" (Traditional) – 2:59 Performed by Cory Wells and the Enemys
4. "Time to Get Alone" (Brian Wilson) – 2:49 Performed by Redwood, previously unreleased
5. "If You Knew" (Eddie Brigati, Felix Cavaliere, Gene Cornish, Dino Danelli) – 2:10 Previously unreleased demo version
6. "Nobody" (Dick Cooper, Beth Beatty, Ernie Shelby) – 2:23
7. "It's for You" (John Lennon, Paul McCartney) – 1:59
8. "Try a Little Tenderness" (Jimmy Campbell, Reginald Connelly, Harry M. Woods) – 4:25
9. "One" (Harry Nilsson) – 3:04
10. "Heaven Is in Your Mind" (Jim Capaldi, Steve Winwood, Chris Wood) – 3:02
11. "Easy to Be Hard" (Galt MacDermot, James Rado, Gerome Ragni) – 3:14
12. "Eli's Coming" (Laura Nyro) – 2:48
13. "Celebrate" (Gary Bonner, Alan Gordon) – 3:01
14. "Lady Samantha" (Elton John, Bernie Taupin) – 2:54
15. "Mama Told Me (Not to Come)" (Randy Newman) – 3:20
16. "Cowboy" (Newman) – 3:40
17. "Out in the Country" (Roger Nichols, Paul Williams) – 3:08
18. "Your Song" (John, Taupin) – 3:57
19. "Good Feeling" (Alan Brackett, John Merrill) – 3:34
20. "One Man Band" (Billy Fox, January Tyme, Tommy Kaye) – 2:54
21. "I Can Hear You Calling" (Pentti Glan, Roy Kenner, Hugh Sullivan, Domenic Troiano) – 2:58
22. "Joy to the World" (Hoyt Axton) – 3:17
23. "Liar" (Russ Ballard) – 3:21
24. "An Old Fashioned Love Song" (Paul Williams) – 3:50

Disc 2:

1. "Never Been to Spain" (Axton) – 3:46
2. "My Impersonal Life" (Terry Furlong) – 4:24
3. "The Family of Man" (Jack Conrad, Williams) – 3:28
4. "Going in Circles" (Jaiananda, Ted Myers) – 3:08
5. "You" (Jeffrey Bowen, Jack Coga, Ivy Jo Hunter) – 3:01
6. "Night in the City" (Joni Mitchell) – 3:17
7. "Never Dreamed You'd Leave Me in Summer" (Stevie Wonder, Syreeta Wright) – 3:44
8. "Black and White" (David I. Arkin, Earl Robinson) – 3:26
9. "In Bed" (Lynn Henderson, Wes Henderson) – 3:57
10. "Midnight Runaway" (Gary Itri) – 5:26
11. "Pieces of April" (Dave Loggins) – 4:14
12. "Shambala" (Daniel Moore) – 3:27
13. "Our "B" Side" (Greenspoon, Negron, Wells) – 2:48
14. "Let Me Serenade You" (John Finley) – 3:18
15. "The Show Must Go On" (David Courtney, Leo Sayer) – 3:48
16. "Sure As I'm Sittin' Here" (John Hiatt) – 4:49
17. "I'd Be So Happy" (Skip Prokop) – 4:51
18. "Play Something Sweet (Brickyard Blues)" (Allen Toussaint) – 4:51
19. "'Til the World Ends" (Loggins) – 3:32

== Personnel ==
- Mike Allsup - guitar
- Gordon DeWitte - organ
- Jimmy Greenspoon - keyboard
- Danny Hutton - vocals
- Gary Itri - acoustic guitar
- Skip Konte - keyboard
- Chuck Negron - vocals
- Gene Page - conductor
- Jack Ryland - bass
- Joe Schermie - bass
- Floyd Sneed - percussion, drums
- Ron Stockert - Fender Rhodes
- Patrick Sullivan - cello
- Cory Wells - vocals
- Rusty Young - pedal steel

== Production ==
- Producers: Danny Hutton, Jimmy Ienner, Gabriel Mekler, Richard Podolor, Three Dog Night, Brian Wilson, Tom Wilson
- Executive producer: Andy McKaie
- Associate producer: Bob Monaco
- Engineers: Bill Cooper, Dennis Ferrante, Howard Gale, Jimmy Ienner, Jay Messina, Richard Podolor, Carmine Rubino, John Stronach
- Remastering: Bill Inglot
- Reissue producer: Gary Stewart
- Compilation: Bill Inglot, Gary Stewart
- String arrangements: Jimmie Haskell
- Research: Andrew Sandoval
- Design: Lisa Sutton
- Photography: Ed Caraeff
- Package coordinator: Geary Chansley
