= Captured Live at the Forum =

Live album by Three Dog Night
- Released: October 16, 1969
- Recorded: July 14, 1969
- Venue: The Forum, Los Angeles
- Genre: Pop rock
- Length: 38:20
- Label: Dunhill (U.S. original release); MCA (U.S. CD reissue); RCA Victor (Canada); Stateside (UK)
- Producer: Richard Podolor

Three Dog Night chronology
Suitable for Framing (1969)	Captured Live at the Forum (1969)	It Ain't Easy (1970)

Professional ratings
Review scores
Source	Rating
AllMusic	4/5 stars
Robert Christgau	D+

Captured Live at the Forum is the third album by American rock band Three Dog Night, released in 1969.

The album was recorded at The Forum in Los Angeles. According to Three Dog Nightmare, Three Dog Night opened this show in support of Steppenwolf, who were recording various shows on their 1969–70 tour for an upcoming live album (Steppenwolf Live, released 1970). Steppenwolf and Three Dog Night both recorded for the ABC/Dunhill label and shared the same production team, and it was decided to also record Three Dog Night on this occasion, despite the band's having only released two prior albums. The choice paid off, as Captured Live at the Forum reached #6 on the Billboard album chart.

All the songs featured on Captured Live at the Forum were previously issued in studio versions by Three Dog Night. "Feelin' Alright", "Eli's Coming", and "Easy to Be Hard" were included on the band's second studio album Suitable for Framing, and the remainder on their eponymous first album.

Original pressings of the album bore the headline "In front of an audience over 18,000 on September 12, 1969 in Los Angeles, Three Dog Night was Captured Live at the Forum." Future pressings would remove the date and lead singer Chuck Negron's autobiography Three Dog Nightmare would subsequently list the concert's performance date as July 14, 1969. However, September 12, 1969 is listed as the date of employment on the AFM contract filed for the event.

== Track listing ==
1. "Heaven Is in Your Mind" (Jim Capaldi, Steve Winwood, Chris Wood) – 3:23
2. "Feelin' Alright" (Dave Mason) – 4:55
3. "It's for You" (John Lennon, Paul McCartney) – 2:02
4. "Nobody" (Beth Beatty, Dick Cooper, Ernie Shelby) – 3:03
5. "One" (Harry Nilsson) – 3:37
6. "Chest Fever" (J.R. Robertson) – 7:02
7. "Eli's Coming" (Laura Nyro) – 3:45
8. "Easy to Be Hard" (Galt MacDermot, James Rado, Gerome Ragni) – 4:25
9. "Try a Little Tenderness" (Jimmy Campbell, Reginald Connelly, Harry M. Woods) – 6:08

== Personnel ==
=== Three Dog Night ===
- Cory Wells – vocals
- Chuck Negron – vocals
- Danny Hutton – vocals
- Mike Allsup – guitar
- Joe Schermie – bass
- Floyd Sneed – drums
- Jimmy Greenspoon – keyboard

=== Production ===
- Producer: Richard Podolor
- Engineer: Bill Cooper
- Photography: Ed Caraeff
- Roadie, Lighting: Dennis Albro
- Roadie, Sound: Lee Carlton

== Charts ==
Album – Billboard (United States)

Year	Chart	Position
1969	Pop Albums	6

== Certifications ==
Region	Certification	Certified units/sales
United States (RIAA)	Gold	500,000^{^}
^{^} Shipments figures based on certification alone.
