= Three Dog Night (album) =

Studio album by Three Dog Night
- Released: October 16, 1968
- Recorded: 1968
- Studio: American Recording, Studio City, California
- Genre: Pop rock; hard rock
- Length: 32:22
- Label: Dunhill (U.S. original release); MCA (U.S. CD reissue); Stateside (UK)
- Producer: Gabriel Mekler

Three Dog Night chronology
Three Dog Night (1968)	Suitable for Framing (1969)

Singles from Three Dog Night
- 1. "Nobody" Released: November 1968; 2. "Try a Little Tenderness" Released: January 1969; 3. "One" Released: April 1969

Three Dog Night (also known as One) is the self-titled debut studio album by American rock band Three Dog Night. The album was originally released by Dunhill Records on October 16, 1968. The album is known for featuring the band's Top 5 hit single, their cover of Harry Nilsson's song "One".

The album made the Top 20 on the albums charts in the United States and Canada. It has been reissued multiple times by Dunhill, MCA, and Geffen record labels.

== Background, recording, and production ==
In 1967, Three Dog Night was founded by Danny Hutton, Cory Wells, Chuck Negron, Joe Schermie, Floyd Sneed, Jimmy Greenspoon, and Michael Allsup. The group was a successful live act in Los Angeles and gathered considerable attention by several record labels. After a show at the Troubadour, the group was signed to the Dunhill ABC label, and the band started work on their first studio album.

Three Dog Night was recorded at American Recording Company. Producing the sessions was Gabriel Mekler, who had previously worked with Steppenwolf, and was engineered by Richard Podolor – who would later become the band's producer – and Bill Cooper.

== Singles and artwork ==
The first single to be released from Three Dog Night was "Nobody" b/w "It's for You" in November 1968, followed by "Try a Little Tenderness" b/w "Bet No One Ever Hurt This Bad" in January 1969. The last single released from the album was "One" b/w "Chest Fever" in April 1969.

The album's cover art, designed by Gary Burden, originally only had the name of the group on the front cover. After "Nobody" and "Try a Little Tenderness" were released as singles to only moderate success, the band began work on a follow-up album, Suitable for Framing. During planning for Suitable for Framing's release, however, Three Dog Night singer Chuck Negron approached Dunhill ABC executives asking that "One" (which Negron sang lead on) be considered as the band's next single. The label released "One" as a single in several test markets, and the record quickly became Three Dog Night's first bona fide hit, ultimately peaking at #5 on the US charts. The title "One" was added under the group's name on the album's cover to capitalize on the song's popularity.

== Critical reception ==
Professional ratings
Review scores
Source	Rating
AllMusic	4.5/5 stars
Tom Hull	B−

Writing for The New York Times in 1969, Robert Christgau regarded Three Dog Night as a successful attempt at rock music interpretation:

"On the group's first album, producer Gabriel Mekler unveiled an unprecedented concept: three excellent rock voices, named only in small print on the label, alternated on material which could be characterized for the most part as unjustly neglected. None of the singers wrote, the supporting musicians were anonymous and, with one exception, production and arrangement ranged from tasteful to superb. Taken all together, it was a brilliant revamping of the produced groups of rock's early days, applied to serious songs instead of honest schlock."

== Track listing ==
No.	Title	Writer(s)	Lead vocals	Length
1.	"One"	Harry Nilsson	Chuck Negron	3:00
2.	"Nobody"	Beth Beatty, Dick Cooper, Ernie Shelby	Cory Wells	2:18
3.	"Heaven Is in Your Mind"	Jim Capaldi, Steve Winwood, Chris Wood	All	2:55
4.	"It's for You"	Lennon–McCartney	All	1:40
5.	"Let Me Go"	Danny Whitten	Wells	2:24
6.	"Chest Fever"	Robbie Robertson	All	4:40
7.	"Find Someone to Love"	Johnny "Guitar" Watson	Wells	2:00
8.	"Bet No One Ever Hurt This Bad"	Randy Newman	Wells	4:03
9.	"Don't Make Promises"	Tim Hardin	Negron	2:45
10.	"The Loner"	Neil Young	Danny Hutton	2:32
11.	"Try a Little Tenderness"	Jimmy Campbell, Reginald Connelly, Harry M. Woods	Wells	4:05*

(Track 11's timing is mistakenly listed at 3:05 on album labels and cover)

== Personnel ==
The following people contributed to Three Dog Night:

- Cory Wells – lead vocals on all tracks except where noted, background vocals
- Chuck Negron – lead vocals on "One" and "Don't Make Promises", background vocals
- Danny Hutton – lead vocals on "The Loner", background vocals
- Michael Allsup – guitars
- Joe Schermie – bass
- Floyd Sneed – drums, percussion
- Jimmy Greenspoon – keyboards

Technical

- Gabriel Mekler – producer
- Richard Podolor – engineer
- Bill Cooper – engineer

== Charts and certifications ==
=== Album ===
Chart (1969)	Peak position
Canadian Albums Chart	17
US Billboard 200	11

Provider	Date	Certification (sales thresholds)
RIAA – U.S.	August 15, 1969	Gold (500,000 units sold)
RIAA – U.S.	August 5, 2008	Platinum (1,000,000 units sold)

=== Singles ===
Title	Chart (1969)	Peak position
"Nobody"	US Billboard Hot 100	116
"Try a Little Tenderness"	US Billboard Hot 100	29
"Try a Little Tenderness"	Canadian Top Singles	19
"One"	US Billboard Hot 100	5
"One"	US Record World Singles	1
"One"	Canadian Top Singles	4
"One"	New Zealand	16
