= Suitable for Framing =

Studio album by Three Dog Night
- Released: June 11, 1969
- Recorded: 1969
- Studios: American Recording, Studio City, California
- Genre: Rock
- Length: 28:08
- Labels: Dunhill (U.S. original release); MCA (U.S. CD reissue); Stateside (UK)
- Producer: Gabriel Mekler

Three Dog Night chronology
Three Dog Night (1968)	Suitable for Framing (1969)	Captured Live at the Forum (1969)

Singles from Three Dog Night
- 1. "Easy to Be Hard" Released: July 1969; 2. "Eli's Coming" Released: October 1969; 3. "Celebrate" Released: February 1970

Professional ratings
Review scores
Source	Rating
AllMusic	4.5/5 stars
Rolling Stone	(unfavorable)
Tom Hull	C+

Suitable for Framing is the second studio album by American rock band Three Dog Night. The album was released on the Dunhill record label on June 11, 1969 and was the first of two albums released by the band that year.

The album contains the top 20 hit singles "Easy to Be Hard", "Eli's Coming", and "Celebrate"; the latter of which (along with the album's opening track "Feelin' Alright") featured the Chicago horn section. It is also notable for being the first album by Three Dog Night to include songs written by band members, and for its inclusion of the Elton John / Bernie Taupin song "Lady Samantha", as the duo of John/Taupin would not become widely known in the United States for another year.

The album reached the top 10 on charts in both The United States and Canada and became certified gold by the RIAA at the end of the year.

== Recording, production, artwork, packaging ==
As with the band's self-titled debut album, Suitable for Framing was recorded at American Recording Company, was produced by Gabriel Mekler (who produced other Dunhill artists including Steppenwolf), and was engineered by Richard Podolor (who would later become the group's producer) and Bill Cooper. The band members during the album's recording were Danny Hutton (vocals), Chuck Negron (vocals), Cory Wells (vocals), Jimmy Greenspoon (keyboards), Michael Allsup (guitars), Joe Schermie (bass), and Floyd Sneed (drums, percussion). Engineer Richard Podolor also performed as an uncredited guitarist on the album.

The original version of Suitable for Framing (Dunhill DS 50058) was released as a vinyl LP record with a gatefold sleeve. The art direction for the original LP sleeve was done by Wayne Kimbell with photography by Ed Caraeff. The album's gatefold photo features Three Dog Night wearing greasepaint make-up, and posing with members of the Los Angeles groupie troupe The GTOs.

== Critical reception ==
Writing for The New York Times in 1969, Robert Christgau believed Suitable for Framing suffered for the same reasons Three Dog Night succeeded:

"The material is imaginative, but the familiar songs are less interesting--the embarrassing imitation of Otis Redding's 'Try a Little Tenderness' on the first album is matched by an embarrassing imitation of Sam Cooke's 'A Change Is Gonna Come' on this one, and songs like 'Feelin' Alright?' and 'Eli's Coming' are much inferior to the originals--and the others have been justly neglected (exception: 'Circle for a Landing'). Danny Hutton has contributed a weak song of his own, drummer Floyd Sneed is featured on an instrumental waste cut, and the record is one song shorter than the first (time: 28:01). Its largest failing, however, is the obvious one: it is devoid of identity."

== Track listing ==
=== Side one ===
1. "Feelin' Alright" (Dave Mason) – 3:39
  - Lead vocals shared by Hutton, Negron and Wells; includes the Chicago horn section.
2. "Lady Samantha" (Elton John, Bernie Taupin) – 2:53
  - Lead vocal: Negron, verses. Hutton, choruses.
3. "Dreaming Isn't Good for You" (Danny Hutton) – 2:16
  - Lead vocal: Hutton.
4. "A Change Is Gonna Come" (Sam Cooke) – 3:10
  - Lead vocal: Wells.
5. "Eli's Coming" (Laura Nyro) – 2:41
  - Lead vocal: Wells. Does not include the piano outro used in the 45 RPM mono mix of the song.

=== Side two ===
1. "Easy to Be Hard" (Galt MacDermot, James Rado, Gerome Ragni) – 3:11
  - Lead vocal: Negron. Features an uncredited string section.
2. "Ain't That a Lotta Love" (Willia Dean "Deanie" Parker, Homer Banks) – 2:16
  - Lead vocal: Wells.
3. "King Solomon's Mines" (Floyd Sneed) – 2:29
  - Instrumental, dominated by percussion tracks performed by Sneed.
4. "Circle for a Landing" (Don Preston) – 2:20
  - Lead vocal: Hutton.
5. "Celebrate" (Gary Bonner, Alan Gordon) – 3:13
  - Lead vocals shared by Hutton, Negron and Wells; includes the Chicago horn section.

== Personnel ==
The following people contributed to Suitable for Framing:

- Cory Wells – lead vocals (tracks A1, A4–A5, B2, B5), background vocals
- Chuck Negron – lead vocals (tracks A1–A2, B1, B5), background vocals
- Danny Hutton – lead vocals (tracks A1, A3, B4–B5), background vocals
- Mike Allsup – guitar
- Joe Schermie – bass
- Floyd Sneed – drums, percussion
- Jimmy Greenspoon – keyboards
- Walter Parazaider – saxophone on "Celebrate" and "Feelin' Alright"
- Lee Loughnane – trumpet on "Celebrate" and "Feelin' Alright"
- James Pankow – trombone on "Celebrate" and "Feelin' Alright"
- Gabriel Mekler – producer
- Richard Podolor – guitar (uncredited), engineer
- Bill Cooper – engineer

== Charts ==
=== Weekly charts ===
Chart (1969)	Peak position
Canadian Albums Chart	15
US Billboard 200	16

=== Singles ===
Title	Chart (1969)	Peak position
"Easy to Be Hard"	Canadian Singles Chart	2
"Easy to Be Hard"	US Billboard Hot 100	4
"Easy to Be Hard"	US Record World Singles	1
"Eli's Coming"	Canadian Singles Chart	4
"Eli's Coming"	US Billboard Hot 100	10

Title	Chart (1970)	Peak position
"Celebrate"	Canadian Singles Chart	8
"Celebrate"	US Billboard Hot 100	15

== Certifications ==
Region	Certification	Certified units/sales
United States (RIAA)	Gold	500,000^{^}
^{^} Shipments figures based on certification alone.
