= It's for You =

1964 single by Cilla Black

- A-side label of UK single

Single by Cilla Black

from the EP It's for You
- B-side: "He Won't Ask Me"
- Released: 31 July 1964
- Recorded: 2 July 1964
- Genre: Traditional pop
- Length: 2:24
- Label: Parlophone R5162
- Songwriter: Lennon–McCartney
- Producer: George Martin

Cilla Black singles chronology
"You're My World" (1964)	"It's for You" (1964)	"You've Lost That Lovin' Feelin'" (1964)

"It's for You" is a song written by John Lennon and Paul McCartney of the Beatles for Cilla Black for whom it was a UK Top Ten hit in 1964.

In the US, Black's version of the song peaked at No. 79. In Canada it reached No. 24. A 1971 version by Detroit-area group Springwell (who recorded the track in Canada) is actually the highest charting version of "It's For You" in North America, peaking at No. 60 US and No. 21 Canada.

== Background ==
=== Composition ===
Paul McCartney, who had been present at Abbey Road Studios when Cilla Black had recorded her breakthrough hit "Anyone Who Had a Heart", had written "It's for You" with John Lennon using "Anyone Who Had a Heart" as the model although Black herself has opined: "For my money, ['It's for You'] is nothing like the 'Anyone...' composition."

=== Recording ===
On 3 June 1964 McCartney cut a demo of "It's for You" to give to Black and producer George Martin. Black recorded the song at Abbey Road Studios on 2 July with Martin producing the session. She recalled: "That was some session. ... John [Lennon] and Paul [McCartney] joined me and George Martin. We made one track and then everyone had a go at suggesting how they thought it should be recorded. George said it should be one way, John and Paul another and I just added my suggestions while they were thinking of what else they could do with the composition."

=== Release and chart performances ===
Having Black, who was well-publicized as an associate of the Beatles, record a Lennon–McCartney tune did not result in the anticipated smash hit: "It's for You" followed Black's back-to-back No. 1 hits: "Anyone Who Had a Heart" and "You're My World", into the Top Ten but remained there for only two weeks—29 August & 5 September 1964—at No. 8 and No. 7.

In the US "It's for You" became Black's second single release in September 1964: although the precedent "You're My World" had reached the US Top 30, "It's for You" rose no higher on the Billboard Hot 100 than No. 79.

"It's for You" reached No. 17 in Australia.

Although Black recorded several Beatles songs to be album cuts, she only had one later single release of a Lennon–McCartney song: "Step Inside Love" No. 8 in 1968.

=== Tribute covers ===
Recordings of "It's for You" as The Beatles may have performed it are available on the 1989 album by Bas Muys entitled Secret Songs: Lennon & McCartney and on the 1998 release It's Four You by the Australian tribute band The Beatnix.

=== The Beatles recording demo version ===
On 20 July 2016, the Daily Express announced the original acetate demo featuring Paul's voice was discovered among other demos in Cilla Black's collection and was proposed for auction.

== Remakes and covers ==
- Mina recorded an Italian rendering of "It's for You" – entitled "So che mi vuoi" – on her 1965 album, Studio Uno.
- Three Dog Night recorded a version of the song for their eponymous debut album in 1968. A performance of the song is also featured on the group's 1969 live album, Captured Live at the Forum.
- In 1971, Springwell, a five-man outfit from Allen Park MI, had a regional hit with "It's for You" which reached No. 60 on the Hot 100 in Billboard: the track, recorded at Eastern Sound Studio in Toronto, reached No. 21 in Canada.
- In 1979, Midwest-based Head East covered the song on their A&M Records double LP release of Head East Live!
- In 1995, Salad, an alternative rock group from the UK, covered the song as the B-Side to their single "Granite Statue".
- In 2009, Mr. Big covered "It's for You" during their reunion tour, and a recording was released on their album Back to Budokan. This performance featured vocals by Paul Gilbert, Billy Sheehan, and Pat Torpey, without regular lead singer Eric Martin.
