= Gabriel Mekler =

American songwriter, musician, and record producer (1942–1977)

Gabriel Mekler (2 December 1942 – 4 September 1977) was an American songwriter, musician, and record producer who attained fame in the 1960s, helming albums for Steppenwolf, Three Dog Night, and Janis Joplin. He also collaborated with R&B singer Etta James for two critically acclaimed albums in the early 1970s, mixing blues, soul, and then topped it off with Genya Ravan production jazz and rock.

== Career ==
Born in Mandatory Palestine, Mekler was a classically trained pianist. He grew up in Israel and left to the United States in the '60. Upon arriving in Los Angeles, California, Mekler sought out Dunhill Records and was hired as a staff producer, despite his lack of production experience or familiarity with rock and roll and pop music. His first project at Dunhill was with folk-pop band The Lamp of Childhood, where he oversaw studio sessions, contributed songs and played piano. The group's three singles flopped but Mekler's next project, Steppenwolf, made music history. It was Mekler who suggested the name "Steppenwolf" to the band's members, having just read the Hermann Hesse novel.

A year after the Steppenwolf recordings, Mekler launched hits from Three Dog Night such as "One", "Try a Little Tenderness", "Eli's Coming", "Easy to Be Hard", and "Celebrate". Other studio credits include keyboard work with Cher, Donovan and David Clayton-Thomas as well as producing songs for Dinah Washington.

He married Dorothy J. Scully on 2 August 1967 in Los Angeles, California, and they divorced in November, 1974 in Los Angeles. Mekler was Jewish.

In 1971, Mekler founded his own labels, Vulture and Lizard Records, based on Sunset Boulevard in Los Angeles. Artists signed to Lizard/Vulture included Nolan Porter, Clydie King, Jamul, Paul Humphrey & the Cool Aid Chemists and The Frantics. Despite national chart success both Vulture and Lizard Records collapsed in mid 1972. Mekler remained in demand for his production talent until his death from a motorcycle accident, in September 1977.

Mekler also produced Genya Ravan's Goldie Zelkowitz album, the title utilizing her stage name from Goldie and the Gingerbreads, and the last name of her father, who died during this recording.
