= Joy to the World (Three Dog Night song) =

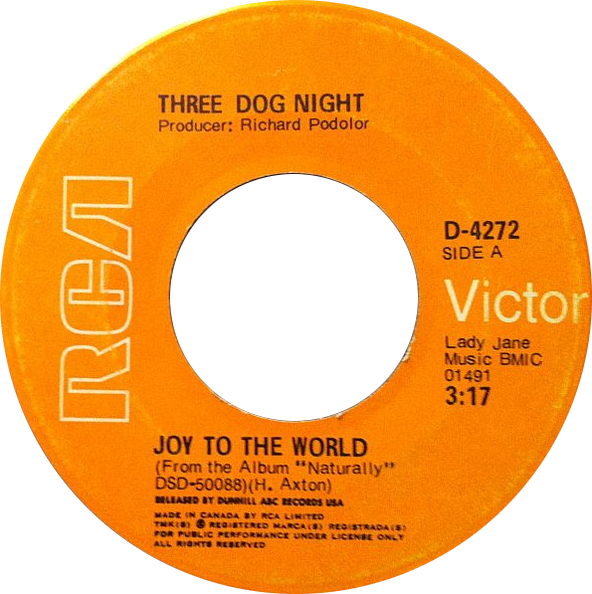
- Original 1971 Canadian single

Single by Three Dog Night

from the album Naturally
- B-side: "I Can Hear You Calling"
- Released: February 1971
- Recorded: 1970
- Studio: American Recording Co.
- Genre: Rock; white soul
- Length: 3:40 (album); 3:17 (single)
- Label: Dunhill
- Songwriters: Hoyt Axton, Chuck Negron
- Producer: Richard Podolor

Three Dog Night singles chronology
"One Man Band" (1970)	"Joy to the World" (1971)	"Liar" (1971)

Official audio
- "Joy to the World" by Three Dog Night on YouTube

"Joy to the World" is a song written by Hoyt Axton and made famous by the rock band Three Dog Night. The song is also popularly known by its opening lyric, "Jeremiah was a bullfrog". Three Dog Night originally released the song on their fourth studio album, Naturally, in November 1970, and subsequently released an edited version of the song as a single in February 1971.

The song, which has been described by members of Three Dog Night as a "kid's song" and a "silly song", topped the singles charts in North America, was certified gold by the RIAA, and has since been covered by multiple artists.

== Background and recording ==
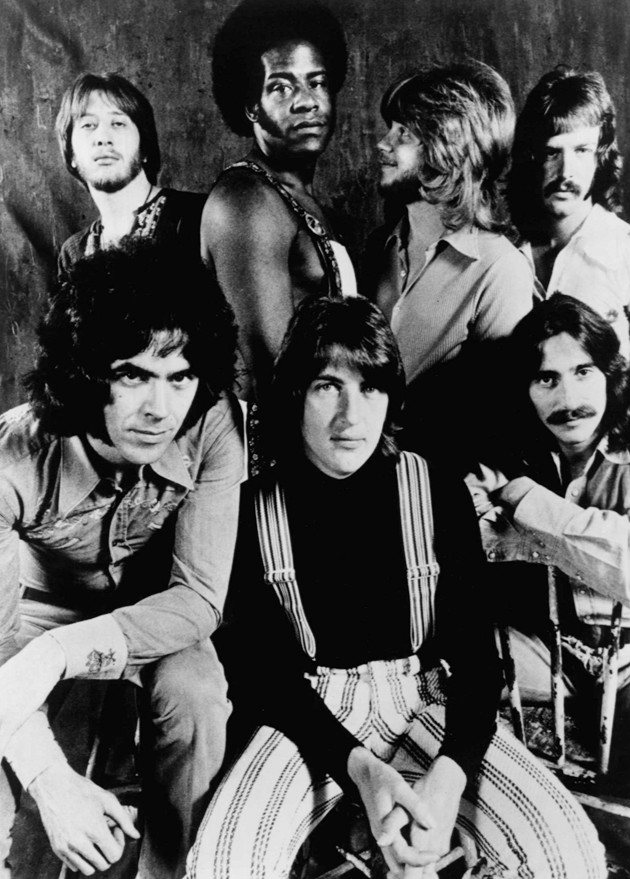
Three Dog Night, 1972

Some of the words are nonsensical. Axton wanted to persuade his record producers to record a new melody he had written, and the producers asked him to sing any words to the tune. A member of Three Dog Night said that the original lyrics to the song were "Jeremiah was a prophet" but no one liked it.

When Hoyt Axton performed the song to the group, two of the three main vocalists – Danny Hutton and Cory Wells – rejected the song, but Chuck Negron felt that the band needed a "silly song" to help bring the band back together as a working unit. Negron also felt that the song "wasn't even close to our best record, but it might have been one of our most honest."

The song was recorded by Three Dog Night at American Recording Company, produced by Richard Podolor, and engineered by Bill Cooper. Unlike most Three Dog Night songs recorded at that point, instead of having just the three main vocalists singing harmony, the song was recorded with all seven members of the band singing. Drummer Floyd Sneed sings the low-pitched lyric "I wanna tell you" towards the end of the song.

When the song hit number one on the US Billboard Hot 100 in 1971, Axton and his mother, Mae Axton, became the first mother and son to each have written a number one pop single in the rock era. Mae Axton co-wrote "Heartbreak Hotel", which was the first number one hit for Elvis Presley.

== Lawsuit ==
In a 1994 case, David P. Jackson filed suit claiming co-authorship of the song and alleging that Axton fraudulently claimed sole authorship. In the suit, Jackson claimed that Axton regularly credited him with co-authorship. The United States Court of Appeals for the Ninth Circuit ruled in favor of Axton. Axton's lawyers included entertainment litigator Jeffrey D. Goldman.

== Charts and awards ==
=== Weekly charts ===
Chart (1971)	Peak position
Australia Kent Music Report	8
Canadian Top Singles (6 weeks)	1
West Germany (GfK)	17
Netherlands (Dutch Top 40)	25
Netherlands (Single Top 100)	25
New Zealand (Listener)	12
South Africa (Springbok Radio)	1
UK Singles (Official Charts)	24
US Billboard Hot 100	1

=== Year-end charts ===
Chart (1971)	Rank
Australia	50
Canadian Top Singles	1
South Africa	7
US Billboard Hot 100	1

=== All-time charts ===
Chart (1958–2018)	Position
US Billboard Hot 100	130

The single had been out less than two months, when on April 9, 1971, "Joy to the World" was certified gold by the Recording Industry Association of America, for shipments of over one million units across the United States. The record was also given a Gold Leaf award by RPM magazine for sales of over a million units. The record won the award for the Best Selling Hit Single Record by the National Association of Recording Merchandisers in March 1972. It was also ranked by Billboard magazine as the #1 pop single of 1971. The song was also nominated for a Grammy Award for Best Pop Vocal Performance by a Duo Or Group during the 14th Grammy Awards.

The single went on to sell 5 million copies worldwide.

== Cover versions ==
Axton subsequently recorded his own version of the song for his album Joy to the World (1971). Little Richard recorded a cover of the song for his 1971 album, The King of Rock and Roll, with a lengthy spoken intro and outro in the style of Black sermonic tradition preaching. The song has also been covered by Conway Twitty, Lynn Anderson, and others.

== Certifications ==
Region	Certification	Certified units/sales
United States (RIAA)	Gold	1,000,000^{^}
^{^} Shipments figures based on certification alone.

== In popular culture ==
- The song was used a variation of the opening theme in Joy Junction.
- The song's refrain was used by Mariah Carey in her 1994 recording of the Christmas hymn "Joy to the World" on her album Merry Christmas.
- In 1998, the song was referenced in Muppets Tonight during the episode "Andie MacDowell".
- In 2004, former Lizzie McGuire stars Hilary Duff and Davida Williams covered the song in their movie Raise Your Voice.
- Singer-songwriter Daniel Johnston liked the song, which inspired his own character Jeremiah the bullfrog, whom he often drew in his artwork and advertisements. The frog is also featured on the cover of his album Hi, How Are You (1983) and has become an official music mascot for Johnston.
- The song was performed by the cast of ZOOM during season 3.
- The chorus served as the finale to the Modern Times scene in Disneyland's America Sings.
- It is sung by the son of one of the main characters at the start of the film The Big Chill (1983) and is featured on the soundtrack.
- The song was included in the film Forrest Gump and its soundtrack.
- In The X-Files TV series ("Detour" - S05E04), Scully sings the song to a wounded Mulder in the forest at night.
- The song's opening lyric "Jeremiah was a bullfrog" was used by Petey Pablo in his 2001 track "I Told Y'all" from his album Diary of a Sinner: 1st Entry.
- It was the opening theme song for the 2002 Fuji TV series Lunch no Joō, starring Yūko Takeuchi and Satoshi Tsumabuki.
- In English translations of Animal Crossing, there is a blue frog named Jeremiah (known as Quattro in its original Japanese), his English name coming from the first lyric.
- It is played during the end credits of the R-rated animated film Sausage Party (2016).
- It appears in 2017 and 2018 TV commercials for Big Lots.
- The song appears frequently in the movie 28 Days, including when Gwen Cummings (Sandra Bullock) finishes her stint in court-mandated rehab.
- It is played during the end credits of Drowning Mona.
- There is a short fantasy story by John A. Pitts titled Jeremiah was a Bullfrog, which reimagines the song.
- In the historical drama TV series Outlander (season 5, episode 2), Roger MacKenzie sings the song to his baby son Jeremiah.
- It appears in the J.C. Penney 2020 seasonal holiday TV advertising campaign.
- The refrain to the song is sung briefly by elves in the 2004 movie Ella Enchanted.
- In April 2006, the cast of the Nickelodeon shows Dora the Explorer and Go, Diego, Go! covered the song on the album Diego, Dora & Friends' Animals Jamboree.
- In 2007, the song was featured at the end of the Sony Pictures Animation short, The ChubbChubbs Save Xmas.
- In September 2010, Nickelodeon covered the song again, this time with the Wonder Pets for the 2010 Mega Music Fest.
- In the comic strip Zits, the main character Jeremy Duncan once questioned his parent's reasons for giving him his name, when in a flashback, while pregnant with him; they attended a Three Dog Night concert and the band started playing the opening lyrics of the song, much to their own secret embarrassment.
- The song and band are referenced by the American folk-rock group Fruit Bats in their song "Singing Joy to the World," off their album The Ruminant Band.
- The song appeared in the Cosmic Mix Vol. 1 of the Guardians of Galaxy series. It was featured at the end of the episode "Bad Moon Rising".
- It is also played at the end of every Denver Broncos home victory. Notable playings of this song after Broncos victories included then-Chicago Bears head coach Abe Gibron singing along with the song in 1973 and at the end of Super Bowl XXXII at Qualcomm Stadium in San Diego. It was also played at the end of Super Bowl XXXIII at Pro Player Stadium (now Hard Rock Stadium) in Miami Gardens, Florida and Super Bowl 50 in Santa Clara, California.
- In Sex and the City (S02E10), Carrie and her friend Jeremiah sing the song while drunk.
- In Friends (S09E13), Chandler sings the song at the karaoke.
- In the show Malcolm in the Middle (S04E15), the song is briefly heard on Hal's radio.
- In the show The Last Man on Earth, the song is used with a singing fish animatronic as a security alarm.
- In the series The Summer I Turned Pretty (S03E07), Jeremiah and his friends sing the song at a bar.
