= Celebrate (Three Dog Night song) =

Single by Three Dog Night

from the album Suitable for Framing
- B-side: "Feeling Alright"
- Released: January 1970
- Recorded: 1969
- Genre: Rock
- Length: 3:14
- Label: Dunhill Records 4229
- Songwriters: Gary Bonner, Alan Gordon
- Producer: Gabriel Mekler

Three Dog Night singles chronology
"Eli's Coming" (1969)	"Celebrate" (1970)	"Mama Told Me (Not to Come)" (1970)

"Celebrate" is a song written by Gary Bonner and Alan Gordon and performed by Three Dog Night. It was featured on their 1969 album, Suitable for Framing and was produced by Gabriel Mekler.

In the US, "Celebrate" peaked at #15 on the Billboard chart in 1970. Outside the US, "Celebrate" reached #8 in Canada.

== Background ==
The song featured the horn section from the rock band Chicago, who at that time were known as the Chicago Transit Authority.

== Other versions ==
- Plastic Penny, on a 1970 compilation titled Heads I Win - Tails You Lose, with the title of "Celebrity Ball".
- Uriah Heep, on their 1994 album, The Lansdowne Tapes.
