= Eli's Comin' =

Song by Laura Nyro

Song by Laura Nyro

from the album Eli and the Thirteenth Confession
- Released: March 3, 1968
- Recorded: 1968
- Genre: Pop, soul
- Length: 3:59
- Label: CBS
- Songwriter: Laura Nyro
- Producers: Laura Nyro, Charlie Calello

"Eli's Comin'"

Single by Three Dog Night

from the album Suitable for Framing
- B-side: "Circle for a Landing"
- Released: October 1969
- Recorded: 1968
- Studio: American Recording Co.
- Genre: Rock, soul, gospel
- Length: 2:49
- Label: Dunhill
- Songwriter: Laura Nyro
- Producer: Gabriel Mekler

Three Dog Night singles chronology
"Easy to Be Hard" (1969)	"Eli's Comin'" (1969)	"Celebrate" (1970)

"Eli's Comin'" is a song written and recorded in 1967 by American singer-songwriter and pianist Laura Nyro. The song was first released in 1968 on Nyro's album, Eli and the Thirteenth Confession.

While attending Joseph Wade Junior High School in the Bronx, Nyro performed an early version of the song in music class to prove to the teacher that rock and roll "wasn't junk".

== Other versions ==
- The song was recorded by Three Dog Night in 1969 for their album Suitable for Framing; a live version also appears on Captured Live at the Forum, released that same year. As a single, the studio version reached No. 10 on the Billboard Hot 100 and No. 4 on Canada's RPM Magazine charts. A 45 rpm mono mix of the song features a piano outro.
- Don Ellis released a version in 1969 on his album The New Don Ellis Band Goes Underground.
- The Friends of Distinction covered the song in 1969 on their album Grazin'.
- Honey Ltd. released a single of "Eli's Comin'" in 1969 on LHI Records.
- An instrumental version of the song was released on the album Images by Dean Christopher and his Orchestra in 1970, titled "Eli's Coming."
- Maynard Ferguson's version appears on his 1970 album M.F. Horn.
- Affinity released a single of the song in 1970; it was also included on later pressings of their self-titled album.
- The 5th Dimension included a version on their 1971 album Live!!
- Singers Three performs the song on their 1971 album Foliole #2 The Sound Of Singers 3.
- The Nylons included the song on their 1991 album 4 On The Floor - Live In Concert.
- Lisa Germano covered the song for the 1997 various artists tribute album Time and Love: The Music of Laura Nyro.

== In popular culture ==
- "Eli's Comin'" was featured in a first season episode of the TV series Sports Night called "Eli's Coming".
- The song is referenced on Elton John and Brandi Carlile's song "The Rose of Laura Nyro" on their 2025 album Who Believes in Angels?.
