= One Man Band (Three Dog Night song) =

Single by Three Dog Night

from the album Naturally
- B-side: "It Ain't Easy"
- Released: November 1970
- Recorded: 1970
- Genre: Rock
- Length: 2:49
- Label: Dunhill
- Songwriters: Billy Fox; Tommy Kaye; January Tyme
- Producer: Richard Podolor

Three Dog Night singles chronology
"Out in the Country" (1970)	"One Man Band" (1970)	"Joy to the World" (1971)

"One Man Band" is a song written by Billy Fox, Tommy Kaye, and January Tyme and performed by Three Dog Night. It was featured on their 1970 album, Naturally. The song was produced by Richard Podolor.

In the US, "One Man Band" went to #19 on the Billboard chart in 1971. Outside the US, "One Man Band peaked at #6 in Canada.
