= Easy to Be Hard =

Single by Three Dog Night

from the album Suitable for Framing
- B-side: "Dreaming Isn't Good For You"
- Released: August 2, 1969
- Genre: Rock
- Length: 3:10
- Label: Dunhill 4203
- Songwriters: Galt MacDermot, James Rado, Gerome Ragni
- Producer: Gabriel Mekler

Three Dog Night singles chronology
"One" (1969)	"Easy to Be Hard" (1969)	"Eli's Coming" (1969)

"Easy to Be Hard" is a song from the 1967 rock musical Hair. It was written by Galt MacDermot, James Rado, and Gerome Ragni, who put the musical together in the mid-1960s. The original recording of the musical featuring the song was released in May 1968 with the song being sung by Lynn Kellogg, who performed the role of Sheila on stage in the musical. The song was first covered by American band Three Dog Night on their second studio album Suitable for Framing (1969), with the lead vocal part sung by Chuck Negron, and was produced by Gabriel Mekler.

Three Dog Night's version of the song reached number four on the Billboard Hot 100 in 1969, and was ranked number 33 on Billboard's Hot 100 songs of 1969.

A decade later, in 1979, the film version of Hair, directed by Miloš Forman was released, with "Easy to Be Hard" sung by Cheryl Barnes.

== Chart history ==
=== Weekly charts ===
Chart (1969)	Peak position
Canada RPM Top Singles	2
U.S. Billboard Hot 100	4
U.S. Cash Box Top 100	3

=== Year-end charts ===
Chart (1969)	Rank
Canada	18
U.S. Billboard Hot 100	33

== Other versions ==
- Stony Brook People released the song as a demo only single in April 1969 in the United States.
- John Rowles released the song as a single in 1969 in the Netherlands.
- Jennifer Warnes released the song as a single in 1969. It peaked on the chart at number 128 in the US.
- Cher recorded the song on November 28, 1969. The recording was eventually released as a bonus track on the 2001 CD re-release of her ATCO album, 3614 Jackson Highway.
- Sérgio Mendes and Brasil '66 released the song as a single in 1970 in the United Kingdom.
- Shirley Bassey released a version, first issued as the B-side to her hit cover of The Beatles' "Something" in 1970, and subsequently featured on her album of the same name.
- Cheryl Barnes, who did the version in the film adaptation of Hair, released a version as a single in 1979. It reached number 64 on the Billboard Hot 100.
- Minneapolis rock group Golden Smog covered the song in 1992 on their debut EP On Golden Smog.
- Three Dog Night's version was sampled on the song "One to One Religion" by Bomb The Bass and on the song "Old to the New" by Nice & Smooth in 1994. Their song was also sampled on the song "A Grand Love Theme" by Kid Loco in 1997.

== In media ==
- Three Dog Night's version was used in the 2005 The Simpsons episode, "Thank God, It's Doomsday" and at the beginning of the 2007 film Zodiac.
