= One (Harry Nilsson song) =

1968 single by Harry Nilsson

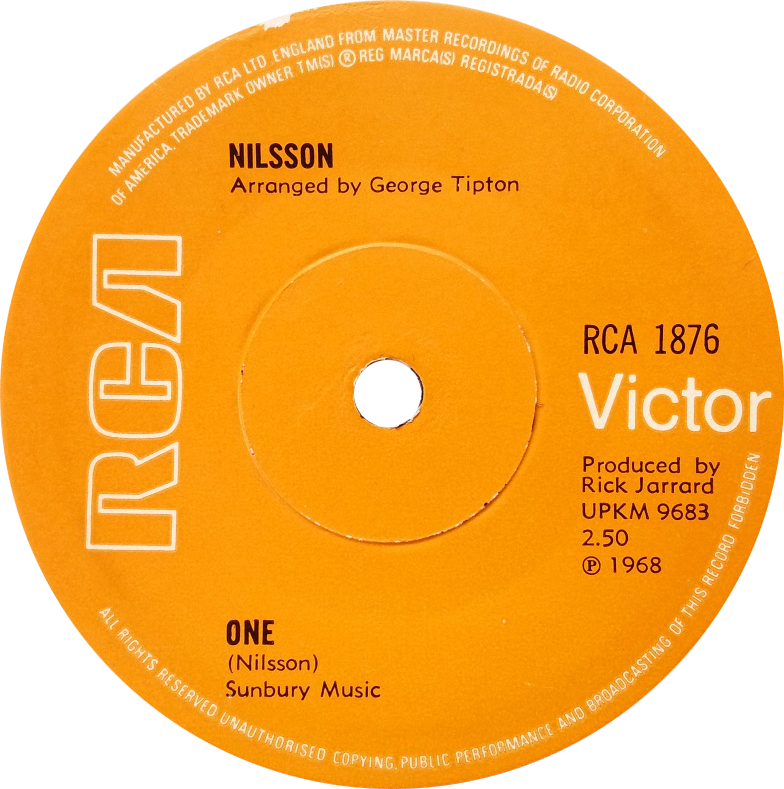
- Side B of the UK single; solid center variant

Single by Harry Nilsson

from the album Aerial Ballet
- B-side: "Sister Marie"
- Released: 1968
- Recorded: 1967
- Studio: RCA (Hollywood, California)
- Genre: Chamber pop; folk rock; soft rock
- Label: RCA
- Songwriter: Harry Nilsson
- Producer: Rick Jarrard

Harry Nilsson singles chronology
| "Good Old Desk" (1967) | "One" (1968) | "Everybody's Talkin'" (1968) |

Audio
- "One" by Harry Nilsson on YouTube

"One" is a song by American singer-songwriter Harry Nilsson from his third studio album Aerial Ballet (1968). It is known for its opening line "One is the loneliest number that you'll ever do". Nilsson wrote the song after calling someone and getting a busy signal. He stayed on the line listening to the "beep, beep, beep, beep..." tone, writing the song. The busy signal became the opening notes.

A better-known cover version, recorded by Three Dog Night, reached number five on the U.S. Billboard Hot 100 in 1969 and number four in Canada. In 1969, the song was also recorded by Australian pop singer Johnny Farnham, reaching number four on the Go-Set National Top 40 Chart.

== Three Dog Night version ==
"One"
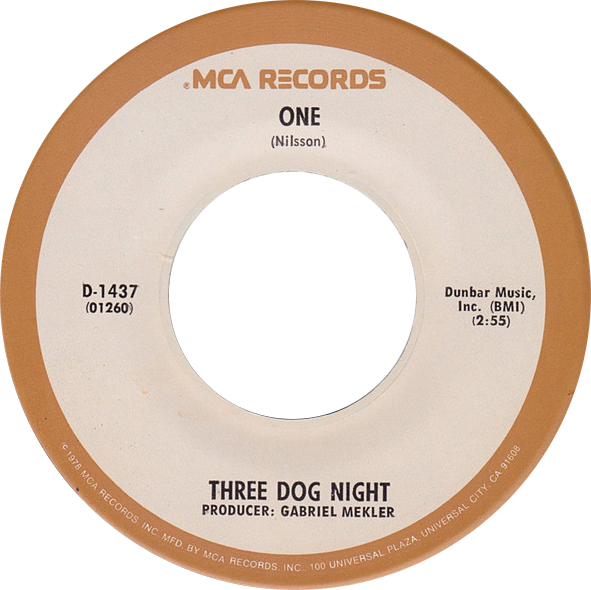
- Late 1970s US reissue

Single by Three Dog Night

from the album Three Dog Night
- B-side: "Chest Fever"
- Released: April 1969
- Recorded: 1968
- Genre: Rock and roll; R&B
- Length: 3:06 (album version); 2:55 (single version)
- Label: Dunhill
- Songwriter: Harry Nilsson
- Producer: Gabriel Mekler

Three Dog Night singles chronology
| "Try a Little Tenderness" (1969) | "One" (1969) | "Easy to Be Hard" (1969) |

Audio
- "One" by Three Dog Night on YouTube

Three Dog Night released One as the third single from their eponymous first album, with Chuck Negron performing the lead vocal. It became their first of seven gold records over the next five years.

The original issue of the single version fades out about ten seconds before the final notes heard on the album version. Upon reissues by ABC Records and its successor labels, the label reverted to the album version which is heard on radio today.

The song reached number five on the U.S. Billboard Hot 100 and spent three weeks at number two on the Cash Box Top 100. It also reached number four in Canada.

== Chart performance ==
=== Weekly charts ===
| Chart (1969) | Peak position |
|---|---|
| Australia (Kent Music Report) | 39 |
| Canada RPM Top Singles | 4 |
| New Zealand (Listener) | 16 |
| U.S. Billboard Hot 100 | 5 |
| U.S. Cash Box Top 100 | 2 |

=== Year-end charts ===
| Chart (1969) | Rank |
|---|---|
| Canada | 20 |
| U.S. Billboard Hot 100 | 11 |
| U.S. Cash Box | 16 |

== Certifications ==
| Region | Certification | Certified units/sales |
|---|---|---|
| United States (RIAA) | Gold | 1,000,000^{^} |
^{^} Shipments figures based on certification alone.

== Other versions ==
Many cover versions have been recorded. Among the most notable are:

- John Farnham released "One" as a double-sided single with "Mr. Whippy" in 1969, reaching number four in Australia.
- US rock band Filter recorded a version of the song in 1998 for the first X-Files movie, re-interpreting the lyrics towards the show's main antagonist, the Cigarette Smoking Man. The song was first released on The X-Files: The Album and later featured as a bonus track on the German release of their album Title of Record in 1999.
- A cover by Aimee Mann is used in the 1999 film Magnolia. The song is the opening track for the movie's soundtrack album. This version is also used in the In Plain Sight season 5 episode 4 "The Merry Wives of WitSec".
