= Floyd Sneed =

Canadian drummer (1942–2023)

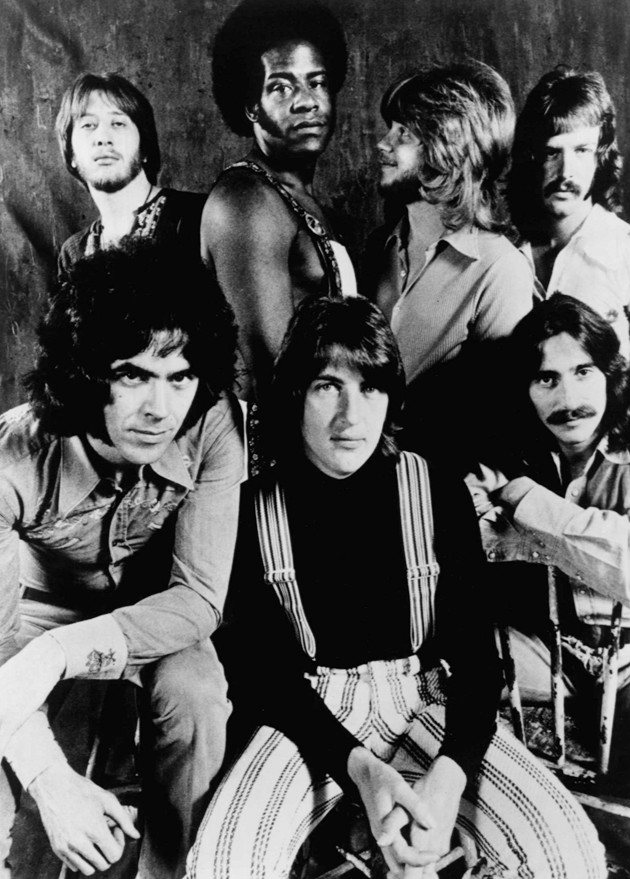
- While with Three Dog Night (1971)

Background information
- Born: Floyd Chester Sneed; November 22, 1942; Calgary, Alberta, Canada
- Died: January 27, 2023 (aged 80)
- Genre: Rock
- Occupation: Drummer
- Formerly of: Three Dog Night
- Website: floydsneed.net

Floyd Chester Sneed (November 22, 1942 – January 27, 2023) was a Canadian drummer, best known for his work with the band Three Dog Night.

Born on November 22, 1942, in Calgary, Sneed grew up in a musical family (his parents were both musicians at their church) and became interested in drums at an early age. His first drum kit was a gift from his older sister Maxine, who at the time was married to the musician-actor Tommy Chong. He was in a band called the "Calgary Shades" that included his pianist older brother Bernie Sneed (1940–2016). He soon began performing in the Vancouver area as part of Chong's band, Little Daddy and the Bachelors.

In 1966, Sneed formed his own band and moved to Los Angeles, California. In 1968, he met a trio of vocalists (Danny Hutton, Chuck Negron, and Cory Wells), who had a contract with Dunhill Records and were looking for backing musicians. Sneed joined their new band, Three Dog Night, which became a commercial success in the late 1960s and early to mid 1970s. Sneed also sang backup on one song with the band; he provided the deep vocal on "Joy to the World", singing the lyric "I wanna tell you." After Three Dog Night broke up in 1977, he continued to work with other groups, including an extended tour with The Ohio Players. He and other backing musicians from Three Dog Night worked together in a short-lived group named SS Fools. He reappeared briefly with the reincarnated Three Dog Night in the mid-1980s. In 1990, he had a minor role playing a drummer in a Chong film, Far Out Man. In 2002, he toured and recorded with the band K.A.T.T., and also formed his own band called Same Dog New Tricks.

Sneed and original Three Dog Night bassist Joe Schermie appeared on the cooking show Food Rules starring Tom Riehl in 2000. This was Schermie's last television appearance. The music director for Food Rules was William Edward Dagsher.

Sneed regularly appeared in concert on percussion and drums with former Three Dog Night lead singer Chuck Negron through the 1990s and 2000s, and is credited on Chuck Negron's Live In Concert released in 2001.

Sneed was descended from the original black settlers to Alberta's Amber Valley, Alberta – their migration to Canada under Clifford Sifton's campaign to entice U.S. farmers to settle in the prairies.

After Sneed retired as a musician, he spent his time in the Pacific Northwest, more specifically Washington State, enjoying the sights and sounds with his friends and family.

Sneed died on January 27, 2023, at the age of 80.
