= Danny Hutton =

Irish singer (born 1942)

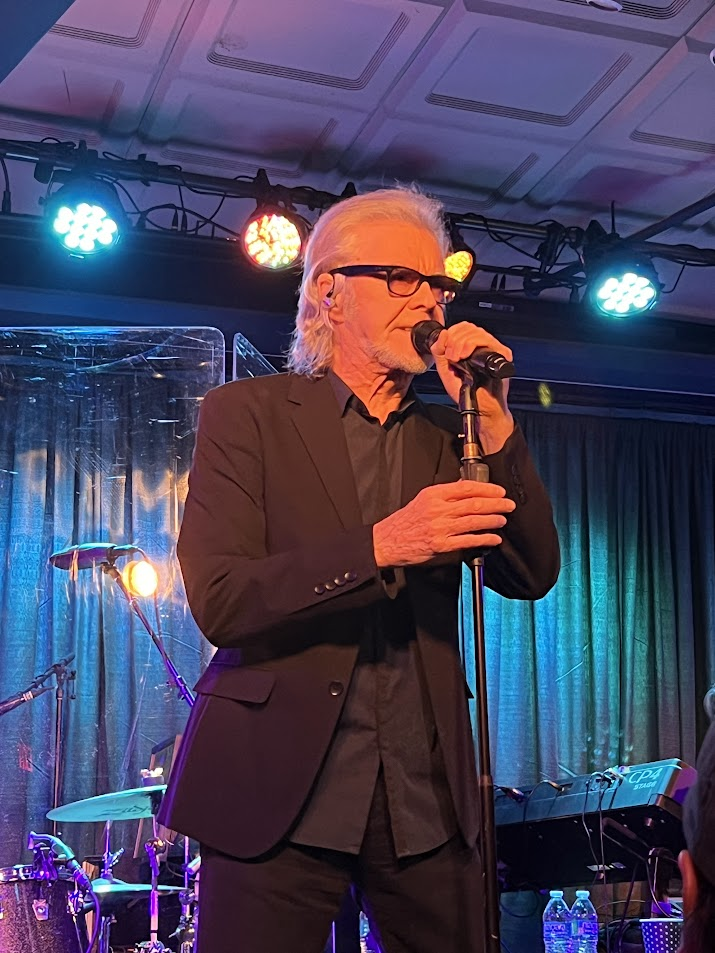
- Hutton performing in Annapolis, MD, 2024

Background information
- Also known as: Danny Hutton
- Born: Daniel Anthony Hutton; September 10, 1942 (age 83); Buncrana, County Donegal, Ireland
- Origin: Los Angeles, California, U.S.
- Genres: Rock; pop
- Instrument: Vocals
- Years active: 1964–present
- Labels: Dunhill; MGM; MCA; Epic; Columbia
- Member of: Three Dog Night
- Spouse: Laurie Anne Gaines (m. 1981)

Daniel Anthony Hutton (born September 10, 1942) is an Irish-American singer, best known as one of the three lead vocalists in the band Three Dog Night. Hutton was a songwriter and singer for Hanna-Barbera Records from 1965 to 1966. Hutton had a modest national hit, "Roses and Rainbows", during his tenure as a recording artist for Hanna-Barbera Records. Hutton is the father of two sons, Dash Hutton, the former drummer in the American rock band Haim and Timothy V. Hutton, a bassist and producer. The sons co-own a recording studio called The Canyon Hut.

== Three Dog Night ==
Three Dog Night was based around the vocal skills of Danny Hutton, Chuck Negron, and Cory Wells. In 1967, Hutton conceived the idea of a three-vocalist group, and he and Wells enlisted mutual friend Negron. The official commentary included in the CD set Celebrate: The Three Dog Night Story, 1965–1975 states that vocalist Hutton's then-girlfriend June Fairchild suggested the name after reading a magazine article about indigenous Australians, in which it was explained that on cold nights they would customarily sleep in a hole in the ground whilst embracing a dingo, a native species of wild dog. On colder nights they would sleep with two dogs and if the night was freezing, it was a "three-dog night".

Their first Top Ten hit was "One", in 1969. "Mama Told Me (Not to Come)", written by Randy Newman, reached #1 a year later. "Joy to the World" became the group's biggest hit in 1971. The group's final #1, "Black and White", topped the Hot 100 in 1972. "The Show Must Go On" was their final Top Ten song, in 1974. They had 21 hit singles, including 11 Top Ten hits and 12 consecutive gold albums, from 1969 to 1975. Hutton served as the lead vocalist on "Black and White" as well as the Top Ten hit "Liar".

Steve Huey of Allmusic wrote,

While often criticized as commercial, the band was noted for creative arrangements and interpretations, and their cover choices gave exposure to Harry Nilsson, Laura Nyro, Randy Newman, Hoyt Axton, Russ Ballard and Leo Sayer. Their backing musicians included guitarist Mike Allsup, keyboardist Jimmy Greenspoon, bassist Joe Schermie and drummer Floyd Sneed.

By 1976 the hits had stopped, there were several member changes (Coming Down Your Way produced only one Top 40 hit and American Pastime failed to produce a charting single), Negron was taking the leads on many of their songs and Hutton left the group; Three Dog Night officially disbanded in 1977. Three Dog Night, an ABC Dunhill Records act, was managed by Reb Foster and Associates of Beverly Hills and the band's concerts were promoted by Concerts West. The band got back together in the early 1980s, and continued with Hutton and Wells along with founding members Allsup and Greenspoon. Greenspoon died on March 11, 2015, Wells died on October 20, 2015, and Negron died February 2, 2026. Hutton continues to lead Three Dog Night along with Michael Allsup and the band, touring regularly throughout the US and Canada.

== Other output ==
Before the formation of Three Dog Night, Hutton hit #73 on the Billboard Hot 100 with "Roses and Rainbows" in 1965, during his tenure as a recording artist for Hanna-Barbera Records. Hutton's "Big Bright Eyes" also charted in 1966. Hutton also sang backing vocals on the track "Sweet Sweet Surrender" with the power trio BBA on their eponymous album released by Epic in 1973.

After Three Dog Night's initial break up, Hutton managed punk rock bands, including Fear. He also fronted Danny Hutton Hitters, whose cover of the Nik Kershaw song "Wouldn't It Be Good" appeared on the soundtrack for the 1986 film Pretty in Pink.
