= Cory Wells =

American singer (1941–2015)

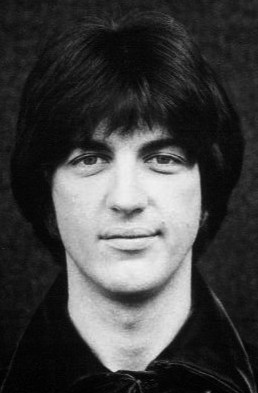
- Wells in 1969

Background information
- Born: Emil Lewandowski; February 5, 1941; Buffalo, New York, U.S.
- Died: October 20, 2015 (aged 74) Dunkirk, New York, U.S.
- Genres: Rock
- Occupation: Singer
- Instruments: Vocals; guitar; harmonica
- Formerly of: Three Dog Night

Cory Wells (born Emil Lewandowski; February 5, 1941 – October 20, 2015) was an American singer, best known as one of the three lead vocalists in the band Three Dog Night.

== Early life ==
Wells came from a musical family and began playing in Buffalo, New York-area bands in his teens. His biological father, who was married to someone other than his mother, died when Cory was a small child, leaving his mother to struggle financially until she eventually married. She gave Cory her birth surname, although Cory eventually changed his surname to Wells (a shortened version of his birth father's surname, Wellsley). His full stage name "Cory Wells" was suggested by The Enemys' first manager, Gene Jacobs, who had a son named Cory.

Having survived childhood in a low-income, blue-collar neighborhood and an even more brutal home environment fueled by an abusive stepfather, this according to manager Joel Cohen's band biography, Three Dog Night And Me, Wells joined the United States Air Force directly out of high school. While in the Air Force, he formed a band of interracial musical performers, inspired by his boyhood love of a similar popular band called The Del-Vikings, who had a national hit with the doo-wop song, "Come Go with Me".

== Career ==
Following his military tour of duty, Wells returned to Buffalo and was asked to join a band named the Vibratos. Gene Jacobs, the brother-in-law of the Vibratos guitar player, Mike Lustan, suggested to him that the Vibratos travel to California if they were serious about making it in music. They took his advice and changed the name of the band to "The Enemys." They soon began working the clubs in Los Angeles, San Diego, Las Vegas and Sacramento, and they became the house band at the Whisky a Go Go. They were also featured in the television shows The Beverly Hillbillies, Burke's Law, Riot on Sunset Strip, and the film Harper, with Paul Newman. While at the Whisky a Go Go, Cher asked the band to tour with Sonny & Cher. It was on this tour that Wells met Danny Hutton, a former songwriter/performer for Hanna-Barbera Productions who became his future partner in the rock band Three Dog Night. The Enemys had minor hits with recordings of "Hey Joe" and "Sinner Man". Wells moved to Phoenix in 1967 where he formed The Cory Wells Blues Band, whose bass player was future Three Dog Night bass player, Joe Schermetzler (stage name Joe Schermie). In 1968, Wells returned to Hollywood where he "couch-surfed" while Danny Hutton worked to convince him of the feasibility of forming a group with three lead singers and a back-up band.

=== Three Dog Night ===
Hutton and Wells formed Three Dog Night in 1968. They found a third lead singer in Chuck Negron, whom Hutton had met at a Hollywood party. Hutton, Wells, and Negron met The Beach Boys' Brian Wilson, and they recorded demos under the name "Redwood" with Wilson as producer. The sessions produced a potential single, "Time to Get Alone," but Beach Boy member Mike Love wanted to save the song for the next Beach Boys album. Having perfected their three-part harmony sound, Wells, Hutton and Negron added a four-piece backing group consisting of guitarist Michael Allsup, organist Jimmy Greenspoon, bassist Joe Schermie, and drummer Floyd Sneed. The group began performing as Three Dog Night in 1968, and became one of the most successful bands of the late 1960s and early 1970s. Wells sang the lead vocal on Three Dog Night's Billboard No. 1 hit song "Mama Told Me (Not to Come)". He said that Randy Newman, who wrote the song, later called him on the phone and said: "I just want to thank you for putting my kids through college."

Unlike many other rock musicians of the day, Wells managed to abstain from alcohol and other drugs. He chose to live a somewhat moderate existence, rather than squandering his earnings on a lavish lifestyle like many other successful rock stars. After Three Dog Night broke up in 1976, Wells tried a solo career, recording the albums Touch Me (1978) and Ahead of the Storm (1979) for A&M Records. Wells helped re-launch Three Dog Night in the early-1980s, recording an EP called It's a Jungle, released in 1983. In 1985, a falling out with Negron left Hutton and Wells with the name "Three Dog Night" as an entity, and the pair (along with original member Mike Allsup) toured regularly each year. Original member Jimmy Greenspoon also toured with Three Dog Night until his diagnosis of metastatic melanoma in late 2014, which led to his death on March 11, 2015.

== Death ==
Wells died in his sleep on October 20, 2015, at Brooks Memorial Hospital in Dunkirk, New York at the age of 74. His family later confirmed he had been fighting multiple myeloma, a form of blood cancer, since September. He was survived by Mary Jane Catalano, his wife of 50 years. They had two daughters, Dawn Marie and CoryAnn, and five grandchildren.
