= Jimmy Greenspoon =

American musician (1948–2015)

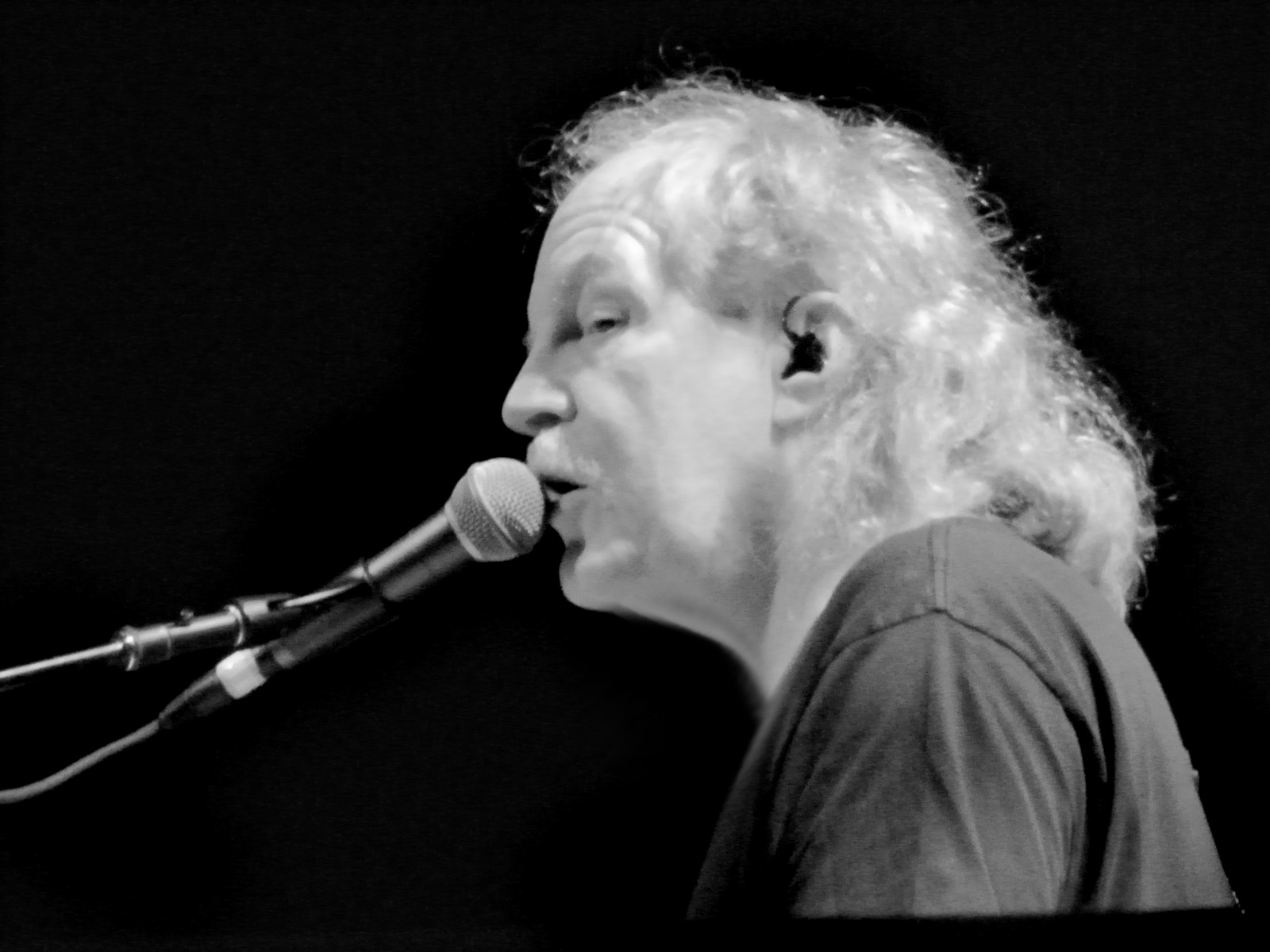
- Greenspoon in 2012

Background information
- Also known as: The Maestro
- Born: James Boyd Greenspoon; February 7, 1948; Beverly Hills, California, U.S.
- Died: March 11, 2015 (aged 67) North Potomac, Maryland, U.S.
- Genres: Rock; pop
- Occupation: Musician
- Instruments: Keyboards; vocals
- Years active: 1963–2015
- Label: Dunhill
- Formerly of: Three Dog Night
- Website: threedognight.com

James Boyd Greenspoon (February 7, 1948 – March 11, 2015) was an American keyboard player and composer, best known as a member of the band Three Dog Night.

== Early life and education ==
Greenspoon was born in Los Angeles, California, and raised in Beverly Hills. His musical training began at the age of seven with classical piano lessons. Greenspoon attended Beverly Hills High School along with Richard Dreyfuss, Bonnie Franklin, his childhood friends producer, Michael Lloyd and drummer, songwriter, singer Art Guy. Lloyd, Greenspoon and Guy had their first chart success with the surf group The New Dimensions, in 1963. Greenspoon attended the Los Angeles Conservatory of Music and studied with west coast piano instructor, Harry Fields. Greenspoon had one daughter, Heather Greenspoon.

== Career ==
Greenspoon performed and recorded with Linda Ronstadt, Eric Clapton, Jimi Hendrix, America, The Beach Boys, Beck, Bogert & Appice, Nils Lofgren, Lowell George, Kim Fowley, Donovan, Buddy Miles, Stephen Stills, Jeff Beck, Chris Hillman, Steve Cropper, Duck Dunn, James Burton, Hal Blaine, Leon Russell, The Wrecking Crew, Osibisa, Shaun Cassidy, Cheech & Chong, and Redbone.

Greenspoon worked on the Sunset Strip in the 1960s with the groups Sound of the Seventh Son and The East Side Kids. His bands held residence at The Trip, Stratford on Sunset (now The House Of Blues) Brave New World, Bidos Litos, Ciros, and The Whiskey. In approximately 1964, Greenspoon joined forces with drummer, singer, songwriter Art Guy, who he had attended school with and formed the band The New Dimensions with Michael Lloyd. Greenspoon and Guy were signed to Original Sounds Records, after penning and recording the original song; Funny Feelin', which the pair co-wrote, played and sang lead.

In late 1966, Greenspoon moved to Denver, Colorado, with the members of The West Coast Pop Art Experimental Band and formed the group Superband. In 1968, Greenspoon moved back to Los Angeles, where he met Danny Hutton, and subsequently formed Three Dog Night.

Greenspoon played with Three Dog Night the entire time they existed in his lifetime, from their formation in 1967 until their breakup in 1976 including all their albums, then again when they reformed in 1981 until his death in 2015, a total of 43 years. He was the longest-tenured of the band's musicians, closely followed by guitarist Michael Allsup who spent 40 years onboard.

=== Other ventures ===
Greenspoon served as an Entertainment and Media Consultant with the Murry-Wood Foundation and composed original music for the movie Fragment, produced by Lloyd Levin. He collaborated with the composer Neil Argo.

== Recognition ==
In 2000, a Golden Palm Star on the Palm Springs, California, Walk of Stars was dedicated to him.

== Illness and death ==
In October 2014, Greenspoon was diagnosed with metastatic melanoma, and stopped touring with Three Dog Night. He died of cancer on March 11, 2015, in North Potomac, Maryland, at the age of 67.

== Bibliography ==
- Greenspoon, Jimmy; Bego, Mark (1991). One Is the Loneliest Number. Pharos Books. ISBN 978-0886876470.
