= Three Dog Night =

American rock band

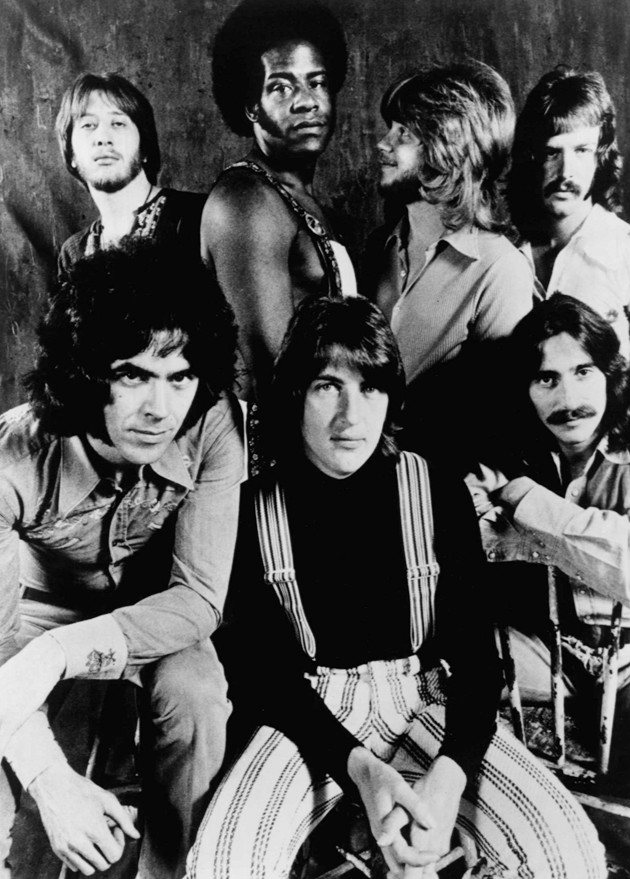
- Classic lineup of Three Dog Night in 1972. Back L–R: Joe Schermie, Floyd Sneed, Michael Allsup and Jimmy Greenspoon. Front L–R: Danny Hutton, Cory Wells and Chuck Negron

Background information
- Also known as: Redwood (1967–1968)
- Origin: Los Angeles, California, U.S.
- Genres: Pop rock; soft rock; roots rock; funk rock; blue-eyed soul
- Years active: 1967–1976; 1981–present
- Labels: Dunhill; MGM; MCA; Epic; Columbia
- Members: Danny Hutton; Paul Kingery; David Morgan; Howard Laravea; Timothy Hutton; Dash Hutton
- Past members: Cory Wells; Chuck Negron; Ron Morgan; Michael Allsup; Jimmy Greenspoon; Floyd Sneed; Joe Schermie; Jack Ryland; Skip Konte; Mickey McMeel; James "Smitty" Smith; Dennis Belfield; Al Ciner; Jay Gruska; Ron Stockert; Mike Seifrit; Richard Grossman; Mike Keeley; Scott Manzo; Pat Bauz; Steve Ezzo; Gary Moon; T. J. Parker; Richard Campbell; Mike Cuneo

Three Dog Night is an American rock band formed in Los Angeles in 1967, founded by vocalists Chuck Negron, Cory Wells, and Danny Hutton. This lineup was soon augmented by Jimmy Greenspoon (keyboards), Joe Schermie (bass guitar), Michael Allsup (guitar), and Floyd Sneed (drums). The band had 21 Billboard Hot 100 top 40 hits between 1969 and 1975, with three hitting number one. Three Dog Night recorded many songs written by outside songwriters, and they helped to introduce mainstream audiences to writers such as Harry Nilsson ("One"), Randy Newman ("Mama Told Me Not to Come"), Paul Williams ("An Old Fashioned Love Song"), Laura Nyro ("Eli's Comin'") and Hoyt Axton ("Joy to the World", "Never Been to Spain").

== Name origin ==
The commentary included in the CD set Celebrate: The Three Dog Night Story, 1965–1975 states that vocalist Danny Hutton's girlfriend, actress June Fairchild (best known as the "Ajax Lady" from the Cheech & Chong 1978 film Up in Smoke) suggested the name after reading a magazine article about Aboriginal Australians, in which it was explained that on cold nights they would customarily sleep while embracing a dingo, a native species of wild dog. On colder nights they would sleep with two dogs and, if the night was freezing cold, it was a "three dog night".

Musician Van Dyke Parks, an arranger at Warner Bros. Records, disputed the above story and said he coined the name. He wrote on Twitter, "I wuz [sic] nuts about Hutton's girlfriend. Quite a dancer. Yet, she didn't read Mankind magazine, nor have an inkling of anthtopology [sic] and the cold aboriginal nights that inspired my suggestion."

== History ==
=== Background ===
The three vocalists, Hutton (who got his start with Hanna-Barbera Records in 1964), Negron, and Wells (who landed a recording contract with Dunhill Records) first came together in 1967. They initially went by the name Redwood and made some recordings with Brian Wilson while the Beach Boys were working on the album Wild Honey.

Redwood was briefly poised to be one of the first artists signed to the Beach Boys' Brother Records. According to Beach Boy Mike Love, "[Brian] had them in the studio for several days, and he was really funny. They didn't meet up to his expectations. ... They'd go in and they wouldn't sing well enough for him. ... but they went off and made billions." Wilson attempted to produce an album for Redwood, but after the recording of three songs, including "Time to Get Alone" and "Darlin'", this motion was halted by his bandmates, who wanted Brian to focus on the Beach Boys' contractual obligations. According to Negron, due to the commercial failure of Smiley Smile and Wilson's waning commitment to his band, "the other Beach Boys wanted Brian's immense songwriting and producing talents used strictly to enhance their own careers". Negron later noted that he would have acted similarly had he been in the same position as the Beach Boys.

Shortly after abandoning the Redwood moniker in 1968, the vocalists hired a group of backing musicians – Ron Morgan on guitar, Floyd Sneed on drums, Joe Schermie from the Cory Wells Blues Band on bass, and Jimmy Greenspoon on keyboards – and soon took the name Three Dog Night. Morgan left the band before its first album was recorded and subsequently joined the Electric Prunes. Michael Allsup was quickly recruited to replace Morgan on guitar.

=== 1968–1972 ===
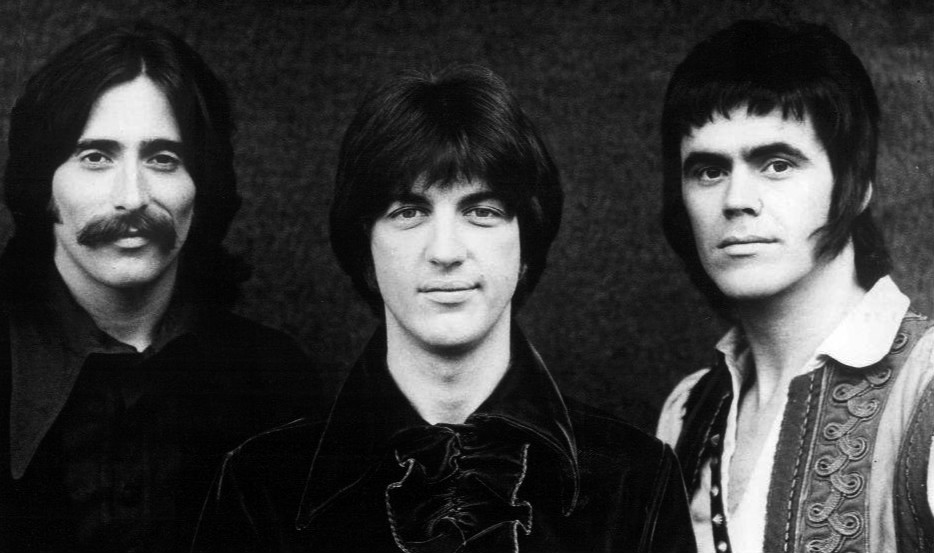
Negron, Wells and Hutton in 1969

Three Dog Night made its official debut in 1968 at the Whisky a Go Go, at a 5 p.m. press party hosted by Dunhill Records. They were still in the process of making their first album Three Dog Night when they heard the favorable reactions from the hypercritical audience.

The album Three Dog Night was a success with its hit songs "Nobody", "Try A Little Tenderness", and "One" and helped the band gain recognition and become one of the top-drawing concert acts of their time.

Between 1969 and 1972 they had 13 songs in a row reach the Top 10 on the Canadian RPM charts, and two more in 1973 and 1974.

In December 1972, the band hosted and performed on the inaugural edition of Dick Clark's New Year's Eve special New Year's Rockin' Eve, Three Dog Night's New Year's Rockin' Eve, on NBC.

=== 1973–1979 ===
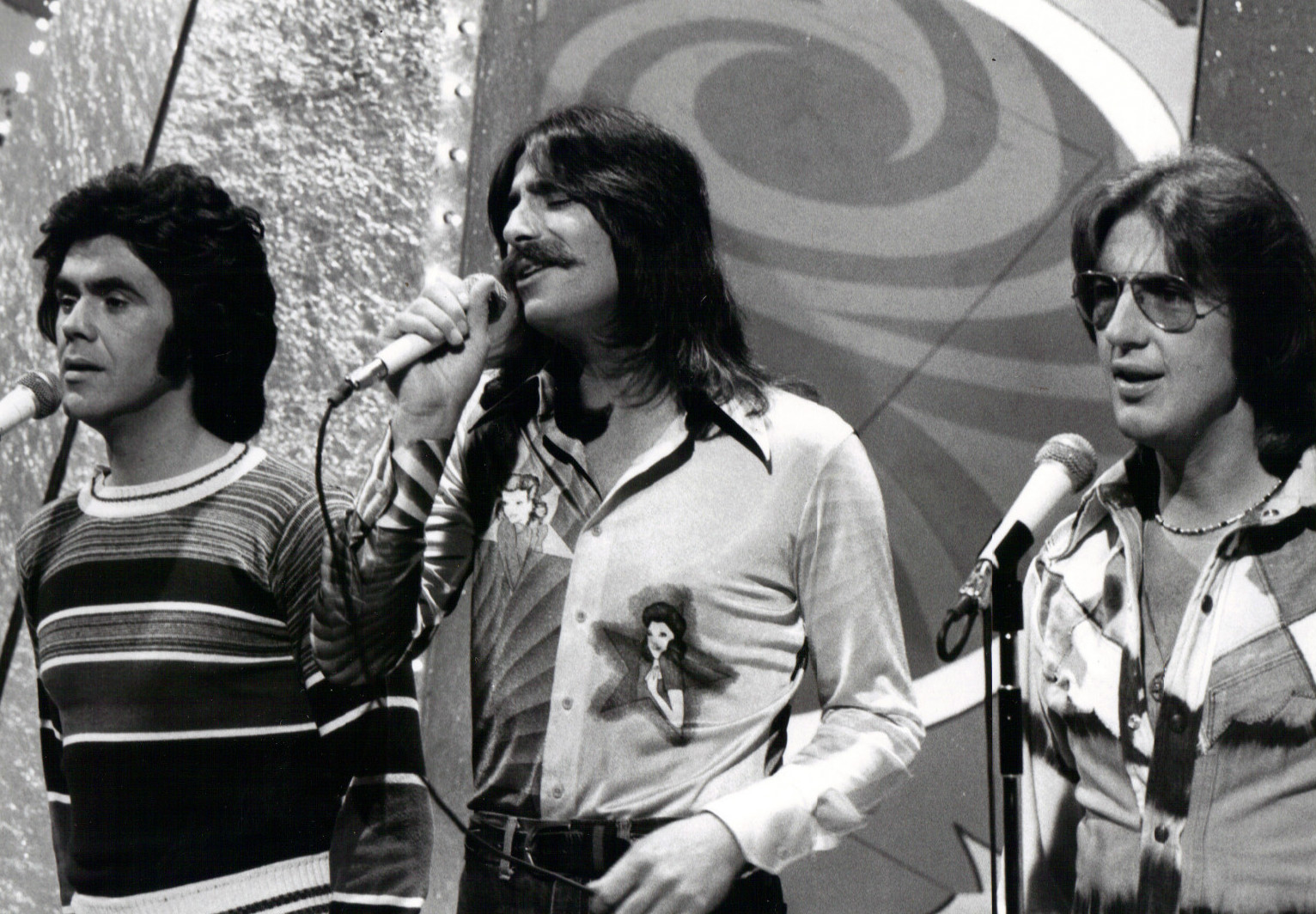
Three Dog Night performing in 1975

In 1973, Three Dog Night filed a $6 million lawsuit against their former booking agent, American Talent International (ATI), for continuing to advertise in the media that the band was still with their agency when in fact they signed with William Morris Agency in October 1972. Other damages were sought due to ATI taking deposits for booking Three Dog Night, whom they no longer represented.

Joe Schermie left in early 1973 due to "problems arising that were apparently unresolvable". He was replaced by Jack Ryland shortly thereafter, and the band then became an eight-piece with the inclusion of former Blues Image member Skip Konte as a second keyboardist in late 1973. In late 1974, Allsup and Sneed left to form a new band, SS Fools, with Schermie and Bobby Kimball (later of Toto). New guitarist James "Smitty" Smith and drummer Mickey McMeel were recruited, but by 1975, Smith had been replaced by Al Ciner from Rufus and The American Breed, and Ryland by Rufus bassist Dennis Belfield. Mickey McMeel would go on to co-star as "Turkey", the drummer of Kaptain Kool and the Kongs, in the children's television series The Krofft Supershow.

For the albums Cyan, Hard Labor, and Coming Down Your Way, Hutton was absent from many of the recording sessions due to burgeoning cocaine and alcohol abuse (often in conjunction with such friends as Harry Nilsson and Brian Wilson), eventually precipitating his dismissal from the band at the instigation of Wells in late 1975. He was replaced by Jay Gruska.

Hours before the first concert of their 1975 tour, Negron was arrested for the possession of narcotics but was soon released on $10,000 bond.

Coming Down Your Way, released in May 1975, failed to sell well in the United States, likely due to poor promotion on account of the band's recently switched label, ABC, and the growing popularity of disco music. Disappointed by this, the band decided "Til The World Ends" would be the only single released from the album, which ended up being the group's last Billboard Hot 100 Top 40 hit.

Jay Gruska toured with the band to promote their last album to date, American Pastime, released in March 1976. Still, the album did not sell well for the same reasons as before. However, the only single released off the album, "Everybody's a Masterpiece" became an adult contemporary hit. Another former Rufus band member, Ron Stockert, was recruited as second keyboardist after Konte left in the first half of 1976. The group played their final show at the Greek Theatre in Los Angeles on July 26, 1976.

In 1979, NBC reported that the band's accountant "was shot in the arm and paralyzed, in what the police believe was a mob dispute over Three Dog Night." Joe Ulloa, a "reputed mob enforcer from New York", was investigated as being involved.

=== 1981–1990s ===
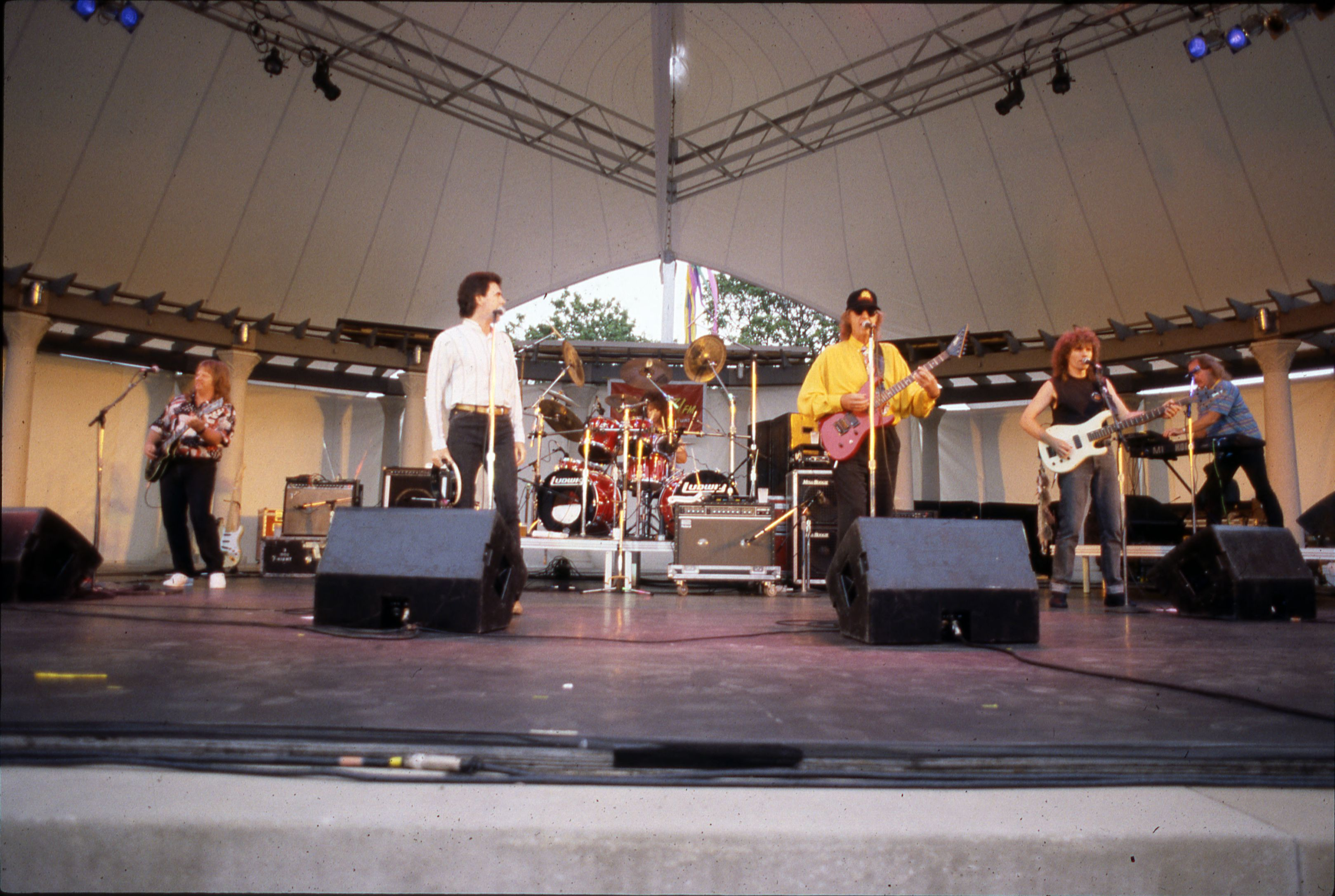
Three Dog Night performing at AmeriFlora '92

In 1981, Three Dog Night reunited, later releasing the ska-inspired It's a Jungle in 1983 on the small Passport Records label, which garnered some airplay on the new wave circuit. The EP failed to sell after Passport went bankrupt. The reunion featured all of the original members, except Joe Schermie, who was succeeded by future Rick Springfield bassist Mike Seifrit until 1982, and then by Richard Grossman, who was featured on It's a Jungle and stayed until 1984. Two guitarists, Paul Kingery and Steve Ezzo, occasionally played with the band, filling in for Allsup on dates he was not able to make between 1982 and 1984. Ezzo replaced Allsup when he departed in late 1984 to take care of some personal and family matters. Sneed was let go from the band at the same time. Also in late 1984, keyboardist David Bluefield filled in for Greenspoon, who was ill. But Bluefield was replaced in 1985 by Rick Seratte (formerly of Poco and later with Whitesnake and others) and the band hit the road with a revised lineup that included Seratte, Steve Ezzo, bassist Scott Manzo and drummer Mike Keeley. The band toured all through 1985, but Seratte left to pursue other offers and Greenspoon rejoined the band with Negron in late 1985 and were both back touring with the group.

By December 1985, after a relapse into his drug habit, Negron was let go, and the group continued with Wells and Hutton fronting the band and Paul Kingery was brought back on guitar to cover Chuck's vocal harmonies. In 1986, the band recorded the song "In My Heart," which was featured in Robotech: The Movie.

More changes in personnel occurred when guitarist T. J. Parker and vocalist and bassist Gary Moon replaced Kingery and Manzo in 1988, and were replaced themselves by Mike Cuneo and Richard Campbell during 1989.

Allsup returned to the group to replace Cuneo in the spring of 1991. Negron entered drug rehab, but did not return to the band.

Pat Bautz succeeded Keeley as drummer in 1993.

In 1993, Three Dog Night performed for The Family Channel show Spotlight on Country, filmed in Myrtle Beach, South Carolina. Kingery returned to the band as their bass player in 1996 following Campbell's departure.

=== 2000–2012 ===
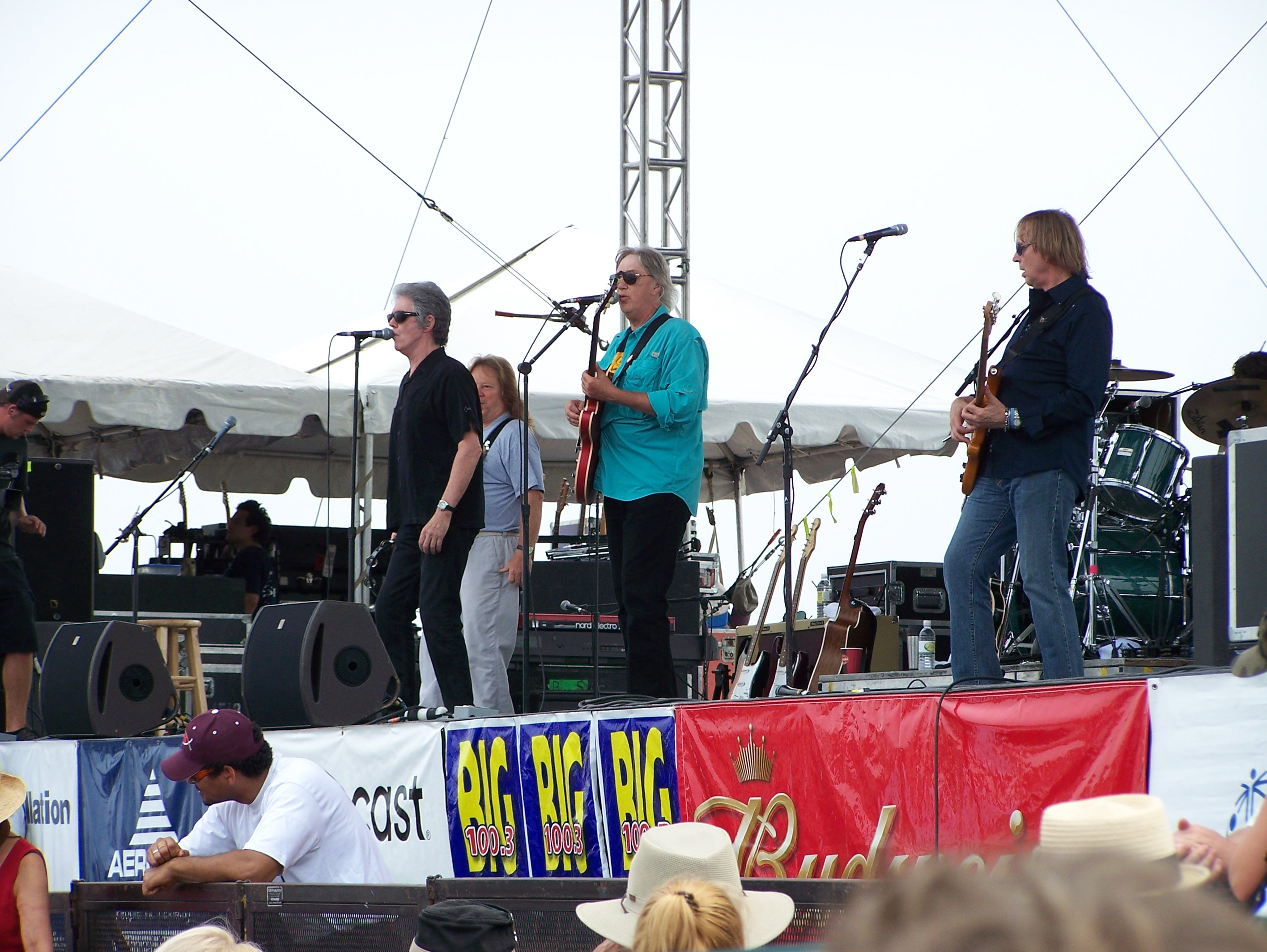
Three Dog Night performing in 2007

Original bassist Joe Schermie died on March 26, 2002. In May 2002 the band released Three Dog Night with The London Symphony Orchestra. The album was recorded in Los Angeles and in London at Abbey Road Studios and includes two new songs: "Overground" and "Sault Ste. Marie". They also released a DVD of a filmed symphony performance from 2000 titled Three Dog Night Live With the Tennessee Symphony Orchestra in May 2002. In the summer of 2004, 80s bassist Scott Manzo returned briefly to fill in for Paul Kingery.

In October 2004, Three Dog Night released The 35th Anniversary Hits Collection Featuring The London Symphony Orchestra. The album includes the two previously released new songs plus live versions of "Eli's Coming", "Brickyard Blues", "Try a Little Tenderness", and "Family of Man". In August 2008, they released Three Dog Night Greatest Hits Live, a compilation of previously unissued live recordings from concerts in Frankfurt, Germany and Edmonton, London in 1972 and 1973. On October 24, 2009, they released three new songs: "Heart of Blues", "Prayer of the Children", and "Two Lights In The Nighttime".

=== 2012–present ===
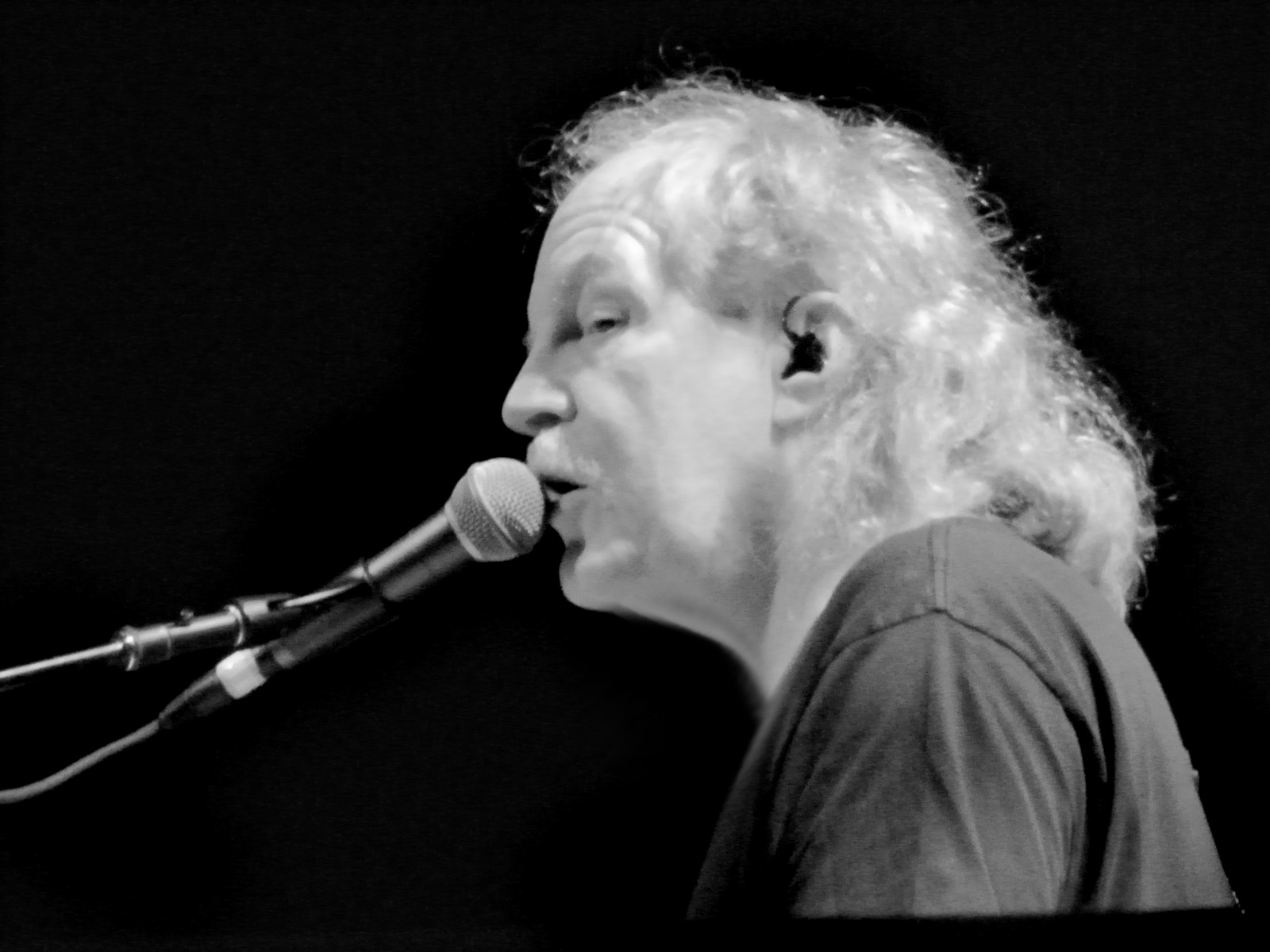
Jimmy Greenspoon performing with the band in 2012

In the summer of 2012, guitarist Allsup was hospitalized for an intestinal disorder, forcing Kingery to move back to guitar, while Danny's son Timothy Hutton played bass. This happened again during the summer of 2015 when Allsup was forced to miss some shows. On March 11, 2015, Jimmy Greenspoon died from cancer, aged 67. His place at the keyboards was taken by Eddie Reasoner who had substituted for him when he was ill in mid-2014.

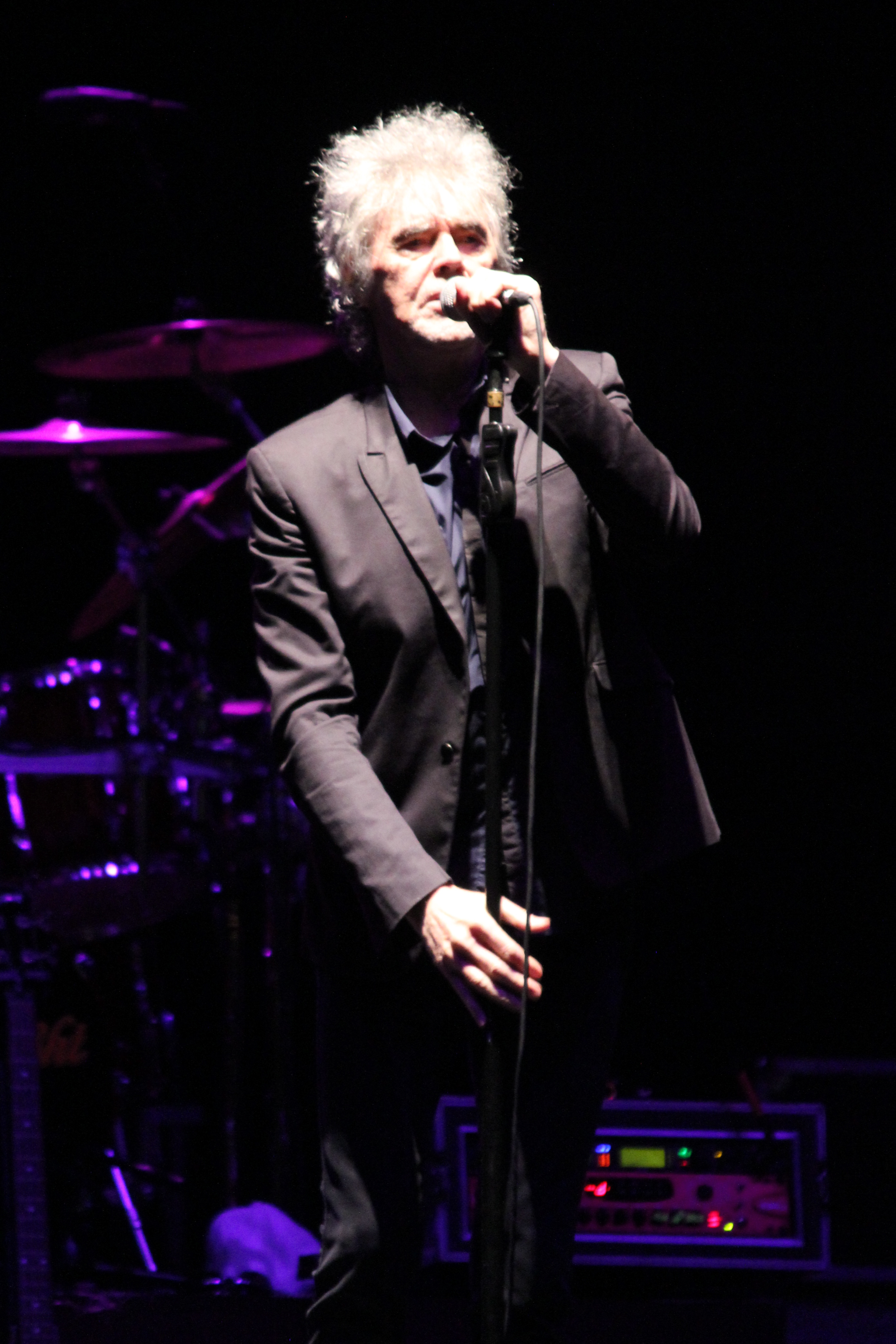
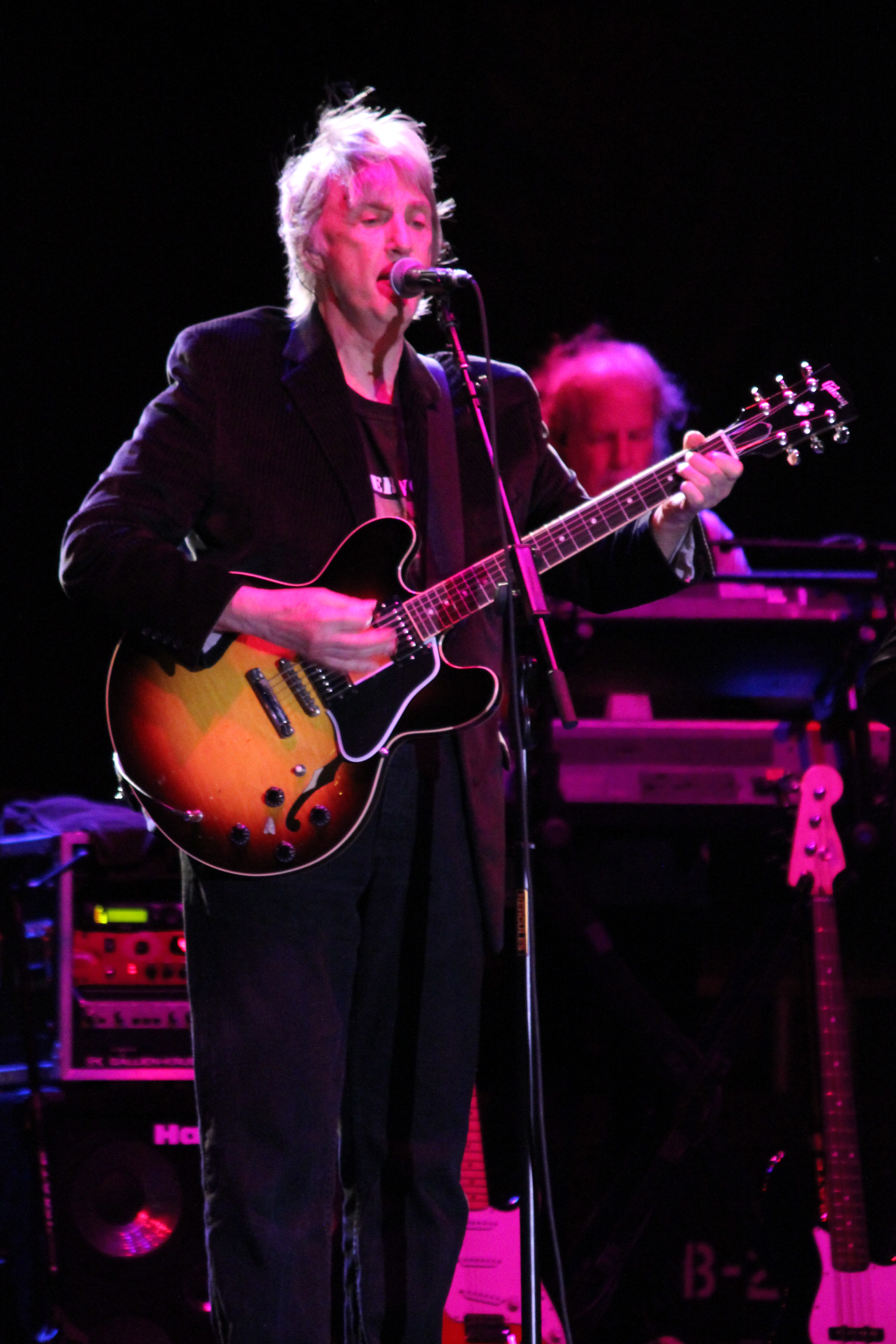
Danny Hutton (left) and Cory Wells (right) performing with the band in 2014

On October 21, 2015, Cory Wells died at his home in Dunkirk, New York, at age 74 after a battle with multiple myeloma. In November 2015, the band announced that singer David Morgan would be joining them on the road. He was a former member of The Association during the mid-70s who coincidentally replaced Jay Gruska in that band. In April 2017, Howard Laravea replaced Eddie Reasoner on keyboards. He was formerly with Frankie Valli and the Four Seasons.

When Three Dog Night returned to touring in August 2021, it was without guitarist Michael Allsup, who was replaced by bringing back Tim Hutton on bass while Paul Kingery switched back to guitar. Danny Hutton stated during 2021 concert appearances that Three Dog Night had been recording a new album before performing their new song "Prayer of the Children".

== Band members ==
Current

- Danny Hutton – vocals (1967–1975, 1981–present)
- Paul Kingery – vocals, guitar (2021–present), bass (1982–1983 as substitute; 1985–1988, 1996–2021)
- Pat Bautz – drums, vocals (1993–present)
- David Morgan – vocals (2015–present)
- Howard Laravea – keyboards (2017–present)
- Timothy Hutton – bass, vocals (2021–present)
- Dash Hutton - drums (2024-present)

Former

- Cory Wells – vocals, rhythm guitar (1967–1976, 1981–2015; his death)
- Chuck Negron – vocals (1967–1976, 1981–1985; died 2026)
- Michael Allsup — guitar (1967–1974, 1981–1984, 1991–2021)
- Jimmy Greenspoon – keyboards (1968–1976, 1981–2015; his death)
- Floyd Sneed – drums (1968–1974, 1981–1984; died 2023)
- Joe Schermie – bass (1968–1973; died 2002)
- Ron Morgan – guitar (1968; died 1989)
- Jack Ryland – bass (1973–1975; died 1996)
- Skip Konte – keyboards (1973–1976)
- Mickey McMeel – drums (1974–1976)
- James "Smitty" Smith – guitar (1974–1975)
- Dennis Belfield – bass (1975–1976)
- Al Ciner – guitar (1975–1976)
- Jay Gruska – vocals (1976)
- Ron Stockert – keyboards (1976)
- Mike Seifrit – bass (1981–1982)
- Richard Grossman – bass (1982–1984)
- David Bluefield (touring) – keyboards (1984)
- Rick Seratte – keyboards (1985)
- Mike Keeley – drums (1985–1993)
- Stephen Sigmon - drums (1997-1998)
- Scott Manzo – bass (1985–1988, 2004)
- Steve Ezzo – guitar (fill-in for Allsup 1983–1984, 1985)
- Gary Moon – bass, vocals (1988–1989)
- T.J. Parker – guitar (1988–1989)
- Richard Campbell – bass, vocals (1989–1996)
- Eddie Reasoner – keyboards (2015–2017; substitute – 2014–2015)
- Mike Cuneo – guitar (1989–1991)
- Pat Bauz - drums (1993–2024)

=== Lead vocal credits ===
- "An Old Fashioned Love Song" – Negron
- "Black and White" – Hutton
- "Celebrate" – Hutton (Verse 1), Negron (Verse 2), Wells (Verse 3), who sings melody through the end refrain
- "Easy to Be Hard" – Negron
- "Eli's Coming" – Wells
- "Joy to the World" – Negron
- "Let Me Serenade You" – Wells
- "Liar" – Hutton
- "Mama Told Me (Not to Come)" – Wells
- "Never Been to Spain" – Wells
- "One" – Negron
- "One Man Band" – Hutton sings melody with Negron on harmony on verses, then Negron takes the lead through the end refrain
- "Out in the Country" – Group vocal in unison
- "Pieces of April" – Negron
- "Play Something Sweet (Brickyard Blues)" – Wells
- "Shambala" – Wells
- "Sure As I'm Sittin' Here" – Wells
- "The Family of Man" – Hutton (Verse 1), Negron (Verse 2), Wells (Verse 3)
- "The Show Must Go On" – Negron
- "Til the World Ends" – Negron
- "Try a Little Tenderness" – Wells
- "Your Song" – Hutton

=== Lineups ===
1967–1968 (Redwood)	1968–1973 (Three Dog Night)	1973	1973–1974
Danny Hutton – vocals; Chuck Negron – vocals; Cory Wells – vocals	Danny Hutton – vocals; Chuck Negron – vocals; Cory Wells – vocals; Michael Allsup – guitar; Jimmy Greenspoon – keyboards; Joe Schermie – bass; Floyd Sneed – drums	Danny Hutton – vocals; Chuck Negron – vocals; Cory Wells – vocals; Michael Allsup – guitar; Jimmy Greenspoon – keyboards; Floyd Sneed – drums; Jack Ryland – bass	Danny Hutton – vocals; Chuck Negron – vocals; Cory Wells – vocals; Michael Allsup – guitar; Jimmy Greenspoon – keyboards; Floyd Sneed – drums; Jack Ryland – bass; Skip Konte – keyboards
1974–1975	1975	1976	1976
Danny Hutton – vocals; Chuck Negron – vocals; Cory Wells – vocals; Jimmy Greenspoon – keyboards; Jack Ryland – bass; Skip Konte – keyboards; Mickey McMeel – drums; James "Smitty" Smith – guitar	Danny Hutton – vocals; Chuck Negron – vocals; Cory Wells – vocals; Jimmy Greenspoon – keyboards; Skip Konte – keyboards; Mickey McMeel – drums; Dennis Belfield – bass; Al Ciner – guitar	Chuck Negron – vocals; Cory Wells – vocals; Jimmy Greenspoon – keyboards; Skip Konte – keyboards; Mickey McMeel – drums; Dennis Belfield – bass; Al Ciner – guitar; Jay Gruska – vocals	Chuck Negron – vocals; Cory Wells – vocals; Jimmy Greenspoon – keyboards; Mickey McMeel – drums. John Mrowiec- drums; Dennis Belfield – bass; Al Ciner – guitar; Jay Gruska – vocals; Ron Stockert – keyboards
1976–1981	1981–1982	1982–1984	1985
Disbanded	Danny Hutton – vocals; Chuck Negron – vocals; Cory Wells – vocals; Jimmy Greenspoon – keyboards; Michael Allsup – guitar; Mike Seifrit – bass; Floyd Sneed – drums	Danny Hutton – vocals; Chuck Negron – vocals; Cory Wells – vocals; Jimmy Greenspoon – keyboards; Michael Allsup – guitar; Floyd Sneed – drums; Richard Grossman – bass; Paul Kingery – guitar, vocals (fill in for Allsup 1982–1983); Steve Ezzo – guitar (fill in for Allsup 1983–1984)	Danny Hutton – vocals; Chuck Negron – vocals; Cory Wells – vocals; Rick Seratte – keyboards; Mike Keeley – drums; Steve Ezzo – guitar; Scott Manzo – bass
1985	1985–1988	1988–1989	1989–1991
Danny Hutton – vocals; Chuck Negron – vocals; Cory Wells – vocals; Jimmy Greenspoon – keyboards; Mike Keeley – drums; Steve Ezzo – guitar; Scott Manzo – bass	Danny Hutton – vocals; Cory Wells – vocals; Jimmy Greenspoon – keyboards; Mike Keeley – drums; Paul Kingery – guitar, vocals; Scott Manzo – bass	Danny Hutton – vocals; Cory Wells – vocals; Jimmy Greenspoon – keyboards; Mike Keeley – drums; Gary Moon – bass, vocals; T.J. Parker – guitar	Danny Hutton – vocals; Cory Wells – vocals; Jimmy Greenspoon – keyboards; Mike Keeley – drums; Richard Campbell – bass; Mike Cuneo – guitar
1991–1993	1993–1996	1996–2015	2015
Danny Hutton – vocals; Cory Wells – vocals; Jimmy Greenspoon – keyboards; Mike Keeley – drums; Richard Campbell – bass; Michael Allsup – guitar	Danny Hutton – vocals; Cory Wells – vocals; Jimmy Greenspoon – keyboards; Richard Campbell – bass; Michael Allsup – guitar; Pat Bautz – drums	Danny Hutton – vocals; Cory Wells – vocals; Jimmy Greenspoon – keyboards; Michael Allsup – guitar; Pat Bautz – drums; Stephen Sigmon - (fill in for Bautz 1997-1998); Paul Kingery – bass, vocals	Danny Hutton – vocals; Cory Wells – vocals; Michael Allsup – guitar; Pat Bautz – drums; Paul Kingery – bass, vocals; Eddie Reasoner – keyboards
2015–2017	2017–2021	2021–present
Danny Hutton – vocals; David Morgan – vocals; Michael Allsup – guitar; Pat Bautz – drums; Paul Kingery – bass, vocals; Eddie Reasoner – keyboards	Danny Hutton – vocals; David Morgan – vocals; Michael Allsup – guitar; Pat Bautz – drums; Paul Kingery – bass, vocals; Howard Laravea – keyboards	Danny Hutton – vocals; David Morgan – vocals; Paul Kingery – guitar, vocals; Pat Bautz – drums; Timothy Hutton – bass, vocals; Howard Laravea – keyboards

== Discography ==
=== Studio albums ===
- Three Dog Night (1968)
- Suitable for Framing (1969)
- It Ain't Easy (1970)
- Naturally (1970)
- Harmony (1971)
- Seven Separate Fools (1972)
- Cyan (1973)
- Hard Labor (1974)
- Coming Down Your Way (1975)
- American Pastime (1976)

== Awards and recognition ==
- Three Dog Night was inducted into the Vocal Group Hall of Fame in 2000.
