= Chuck Negron =

American singer-songwriter (1942–2026)

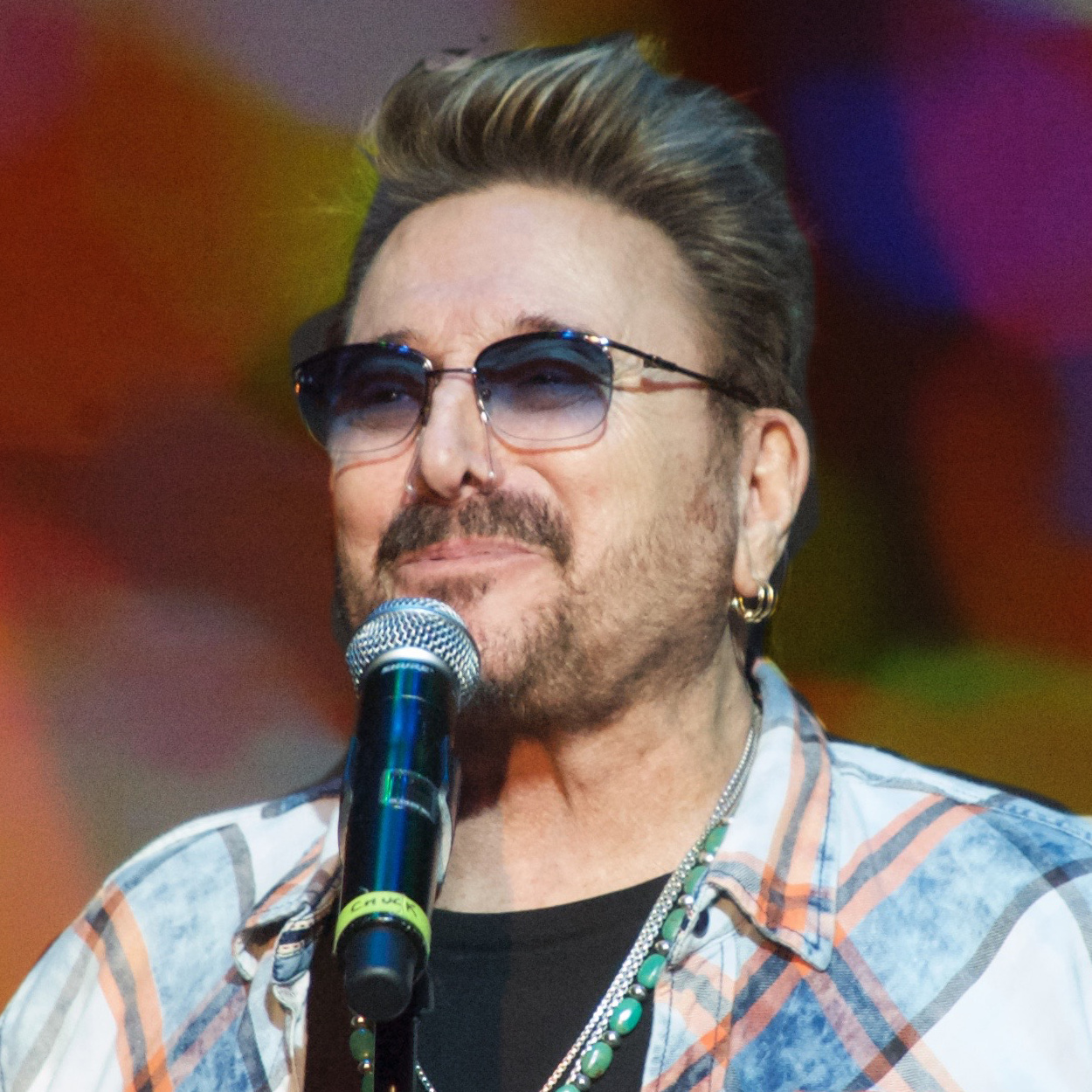
- Negron performing live in 2017

Background information
- Born: Charles Negron; June 8, 1942; Manhattan, New York City, U.S.
- Died: February 2, 2026 (aged 83) Studio City, Los Angeles, California, U.S.
- Genres: Pop rock; soft rock; blue-eyed soul
- Occupation: Singer-songwriter
- Years active: 1960–2020
- Labels: Dunhill; Viceroy; Golden Arrow Productions; Hip-O; Sin-Drome; Negron
- Formerly of: Three Dog Night
- Website: chucknegron.com

Charles Negron II (June 8, 1942 – February 2, 2026) was an American singer-songwriter. He was best known as a founding member and lead vocalist of the rock band Three Dog Night. He died of heart failure and COPD in Studio City California.

== Early life ==
Chuck Negron was born in Manhattan, New York City, on June 8, 1942, to Charles Negron, a Puerto Rican nightclub singer, and Elizabeth Rooke. When Negron was five years old, his parents divorced. Negron and his twin sister, Nancy, were raised by their mother, who placed them in a daycare facility while she supported her young children. Though Negron referred to this facility as an orphanage, it was a mansion in the Bronx that contained a swimming pool, gymnasium, arts and crafts, and more. The facility did house some long-term residents, though this did not include Negron and his sister.

He grew up in the Bronx, where he sang in local doo-wop groups and played basketball both in schoolyard pickup games and at William Howard Taft High School. He was recruited to play basketball at Allan Hancock College, a small community college in Santa Maria, California and played later at California State University, Los Angeles.

== Career ==
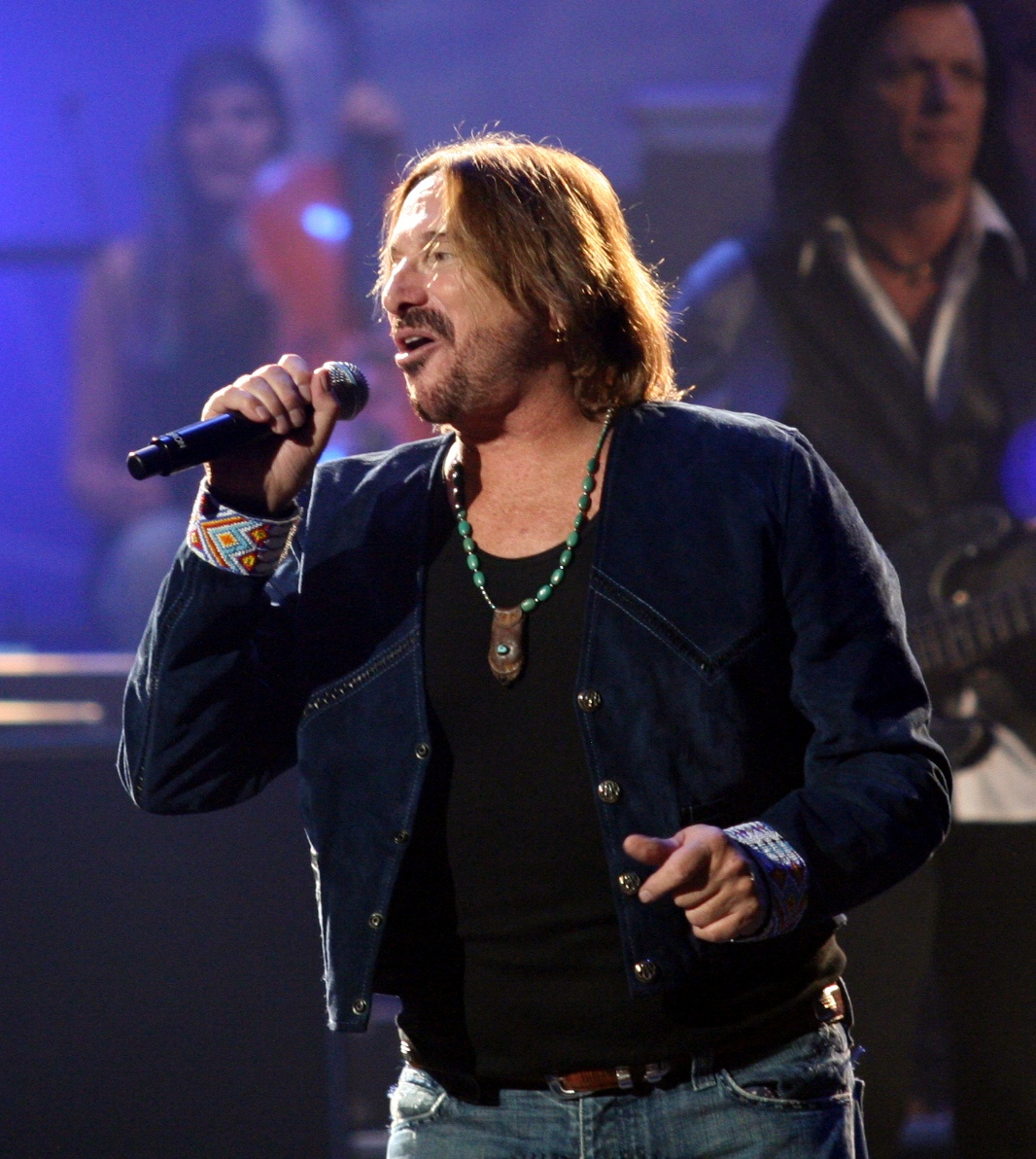
Negron performing in 2008

In 1967, singer Danny Hutton invited Negron to join him and Cory Wells to found the band Three Dog Night. The group became one of the most successful bands of the late 1960s and early 1970s, selling approximately 60 million records and earning gold records for singles that featured Negron as lead vocalist, including "One", "Easy to Be Hard", "Joy to the World", "An Old Fashioned Love Song", "Pieces of April", "The Show Must Go On", and "Til the World Ends".

Negron developed a serious heroin addiction, which began in the early 1970s. In July 1975, the British music magazine NME reported that Negron had been arrested for cocaine possession in Kentucky. Three Dog Night disbanded in 1976.

After many attempts at rehabilitation, Negron overcame his addiction in September 1991 and embarked on a solo career that continued until the COVID-19 pandemic, recording the albums:

- Am I Still in Your Heart? (1995)
- Joy to the World (1996), a Christmas CD
- Long Road Back (1999)
- Chuck Negron – Live in Concert (2001), a double CD set recorded at Southern Methodist University (Dallas) and released by Sin-Drome Records, with sidemen Richard Campbell on bass guitar; Danny Mishkit on guitar, keyboards and saxophone; Frank Reina on drums; and Terence Elliott on lead guitar
- Live and in Concert (2005)
- The Chuck Negron Story (2005)
- Negron Generations (2017)

He wrote his autobiography, Three Dog Nightmare (1999), in which he described his life as a high school athlete and a member of a successful rock band. He wrote about his descent into drug abuse and attributes his recovery from heroin addiction to his turning to God in desperation after dropping out from more than thirty drug treatment facilities. A revised edition with several new chapters was released in 2008 and an updated version was released in 2018.

== Personal life and death ==
In 2006, Negron was featured in an episode of the A&E documentary television series Intervention about his son, Chuckie, and grandson, Noah.

Negron was married four times. He married Paula Louise Ann Goetten in 1970 and they divorced in 1973. Together they had a daughter, Shaunti Negron-Levick. In 1976, he married Julia Densmore, ex-wife of The Doors drummer John Densmore. They were married for twelve years and divorced in 1988. Together they had a son, Charles "Chuckie" Negron III, and Julia also has a son, Berry Duane Oakley Jr., from a previous relationship with bassist Berry Oakley. In 1993, Negron married Robin Silna. They had a daughter, Charlotte Rose, and divorced in 2001. Negron entered into a partnership with actress Kate Vernon, together they had a daughter, Annabelle Negron. He married his manager, Ami Albea, on May 9, 2020. Due to the COVID-19 pandemic, the wedding took place on the balcony of their home, with his two youngest daughters and the minister on the street below.

Actor and comedian Taylor Negron was Negron's cousin.

Negron died of heart failure and COPD at his home in Studio City, Los Angeles, on February 2, 2026, at the age of 83. He was interred at Desert Memorial Park in Cathedral City, California.

== Solo discography ==
- Am I Still in Your Heart? (1995)
- Joy to the World (1996), a Christmas CD
- Long Road Back (1999)
- Chuck Negron – Live in Concert (2001), a double CD set
- Live and in Concert (2005)
- The Chuck Negron Story (2005)
- Negron Generations (2017)

== Sources ==
- Negron, Chuck; Chris Blatchford (2000). Three Dog Nightmare: The Chuck Negron Story. Los Angeles: Renaissance Books. ISBN 158063155X. LCCN 99-60835. OCLC 1036893559.
