= Try a Little Tenderness =

1932 song by Harry M. Woods (music), Jimmy Campbell and Reg Connelly (lyrics)

Song by Ray Noble Orchestra
- Published: November 4, 1932 Campbell, Connelly & Co., Ltd.
- Recorded: December 8, 1932
- Songwriters: Jimmy Campbell, Reg Connelly, Henry Woods

"Try a Little Tenderness" is a song written by Harry M. Woods (music), Jimmy Campbell and Reg Connelly (lyrics).

== Early versions ==
It was first recorded on December 8, 1932, by the Ray Noble Orchestra, with vocals by Val Rosing. Another version, also recorded in 1932, was made by Charlie Palloy & his Orchestra. Ted Lewis (Columbia 2748 D) and Ruth Etting (Melotone 12625) had hits with it in 1933. Bing Crosby also recorded it on January 9, 1933, for Brunswick Records. A version by Bob and Alf Pearson was also released in 1933. The song appeared on Frank Sinatra's debut album, The Voice of Frank Sinatra, in 1946 and on the 1960 album Nice 'n' Easy.

== Otis Redding version ==
"Try a Little Tenderness"
- West German picture sleeve

Single by Otis Redding

from the album Complete & Unbelievable: The Otis Redding Dictionary of Soul
- B-side: "I'm Sick Y'all"
- Released: 1966
- Recorded: 1966
- Studio: Stax, Memphis, Tennessee
- Genre: Soul
- Length: 3:51 (Album version); 3:20 (Single version)
- Label: Volt/Atco; V-141
- Producers: Jim Stewart, Isaac Hayes, Booker T. & the M.G.'s

Otis Redding singles chronology
"Fa-Fa-Fa-Fa-Fa-Fa (Sad Song)" (1966)	"Try a Little Tenderness" (1966)	"I Love You More Than Words Can Say" (1967)

Official audio
- "Try a Little Tenderness" by Otis Redding on YouTube

A popular version in an entirely new form was recorded by soul artist Otis Redding in 1966. Redding was backed on his version by Booker T. & the M.G.'s, and Stax staff producer Isaac Hayes worked on the arrangement. Redding's recording features a slow, soulful opening that eventually builds into a frenetic R&B conclusion, incorporating elements from the Duke Ellington–Lee Gaines song "Just Squeeze Me (But Please Don't Tease Me)" as well as the words "sock it to me." In early 1967, it peaked at number 25 on the Billboard Hot 100. It has been named on a number of "best songs of all time" lists, including those from the Rock and Roll Hall of Fame. It is in the 136th position on Rolling Stone's list of the 500 greatest songs of all time as of the list's 2021 update. A live version performed in 1967 at the Monterey International Pop Festival was also recorded.

In the 1991 Irish film, The Commitments, the band performs the song in the style of Otis Redding. The version by The Commitments reached No. 13 in the Irish chart. Eddie Murphy as the character Donkey sang a line of the song in Redding's style in the 2001 animated film Shrek.

In 2015, the song was inducted into the Grammy Hall of Fame.

The song was also featured in the soundtrack to the 2006 film My Blueberry Nights.

=== Charts ===
Chart (1967)	Peak position
Canada Top Singles (RPM)	23
UK Singles (Official Charts)	46
US Hot R&B/Hip-Hop Songs (Billboard)	4
US Billboard Hot 100	25

=== Certifications ===
Region	Certification	Certified units/sales
New Zealand (RMNZ)	Gold	15,000^{‡}
United Kingdom (BPI)	Silver	200,000^{‡}
United States (RIAA)	Gold	500,000^{‡}
^{‡} Sales+streaming figures based on certification alone.

== Three Dog Night version ==
Rock band Three Dog Night released a version of the song, which peaked at number 29 on the US Billboard Top 100 in 1969, and number 19 in Canada. It borrows stylistically from Redding's interpretation of the song, including the coda that was added in Redding's version.

== Dr. Strangelove ==
An instrumental version of the song is played during the opening credits of the 1964 film Dr. Strangelove over authentic footage of in-flight refueling of a U.S. Air Force B-52 bomber. In the Stage Adaptation, it is used as the opening to the show.
