= 20th Century Masters – The Millennium Collection: The Best of Three Dog Night =

Greatest hits album by Three Dog Night
- Released: May 16, 2000
- Genre: Rock
- Length: 40:25
- Label: MCA
- Producers: Andy McKaie; Mike Ragogna

Three Dog Night chronology
Celebrate: The Three Dog Night Story, 1965–1975 (1993)	20th Century Masters – The Millennium Collection: The Best of Three Dog Night (2000)	The Complete Hit Singles (2004)

Professional ratings
Review scores
Source	Rating
AllMusic	4/5 stars

20th Century Masters – The Millennium Collection: The Best of Three Dog Night is a compilation album of hits released by Universal Music as part of their 20th Century Masters – The Millennium Collection series. Released on May 16, 2000, with hits from the 1970s American rock and roll band Three Dog Night with no new material recorded for the compilation. As of August 2013, the album has sold 1,136,000 copies in the US.

== Track listing ==
No.	Title	Writer(s)	Original Album	Length
1.	"Joy to the World" (Single Version)	Hoyt Axton, Chuck Negron	Naturally	3:16
2.	"Shambala"	Daniel Moore	Cyan	3:27
3.	"One"	Harry Nilsson, Danny Hutton	Three Dog Night	3:05
4.	"Black & White" (Single Version)	David Arkin, Earl Robinson	Seven Separate Fools	3:26
5.	"Mama Told Me (Not To Come)"	Randy Newman	It Ain't Easy	3:20
6.	"An Old Fashioned Love Song"	Paul Williams	Harmony	3:48
7.	"Never Been to Spain"	Hoyt Axton	Harmony	3:45
8.	"Liar" (Single Version)	Russ Ballard	Naturally	3:21
9.	"Eli's Coming"	Laura Nyro	Suitable for Framing	2:49
10.	"Easy to Be Hard"	Galt MacDermot, James Rado, Gerome Ragni	Suitable for Framing	3:14
11.	"Celebrate"	Gary Bonner, Alan Gordon	Suitable for Framing	3:03
12.	"The Show Must Go On" (Single Version)	Leo Sayer, Dave Courtney	Hard Labor	3:45

== Personnel ==
- Jimmy Greenspoon – Keyboardist
- Joe Schermie – Bassist
- Mike Allsup – Guitarist
- Floyd Sneed – drummer
- Danny Hutton – Vocalist
- Cory Wells – Vocalist
- Chuck Negron – Vocalist

== Charts ==
Chart (2011)	Peak position
US Billboard 200	109

== Certifications ==
Region	Certification	Certified units/sales
United States (RIAA)	Platinum	1,000,000^{^}
^{^} Shipments figures based on certification alone.
