= Golden Bisquits =

Greatest hits album by Three Dog Night
- Released: February 1971
- Recorded: 1968–1970
- Studio: American Recording Co., Studio City, California
- Genre: Pop; rock
- Length: 39:08
- Label: Dunhill
- Producer: Gabriel Mekler; Richard Podolor

Three Dog Night chronology
Naturally (1970)	Golden Bisquits (1971)	Harmony (1971)

Alternative Cover

Professional ratings
Review scores
Source	Rating
AllMusic	4.5/5 stars

Golden Bisquits is the sixth album (fifth studio album) by American rock band Three Dog Night, released in 1971.

The album is a compilation of hits from Three Dog Night's first four studio albums, including all nine single A-sides issued by the band to date. The album was released concurrently with the band's tenth single (not included on Golden Bisquits), "Joy to the World", from their previous album Naturally (1970). "Joy to the World" reached #1 in early 1971, becoming one of Three Dog Night's most enduring songs. The three songs included in Golden Bisquits that were not issued as single A-sides are "Don't Make Promises", "Woman", and "Your Song".

According to Chuck Negron's autobiography, Three Dog Nightmare, the band originally suggested the title Dog Style for the album. ABC/Dunhill Records rejected this as too risqué, but liked the idea of a "dog"-themed title for the album, and proposed the title Golden Bisquits instead.

Some editions of the album utilized alternative cover art, featuring a cropped version of the rejected cover photo for Three Dog Night's third studio album, It Ain't Easy.

== Track listing ==
Side 1
No.	Title	Writer(s)	Original album	Length
1.	"One"	Harry Nilsson	Three Dog Night, October 1968	3:00
2.	"Easy To Be Hard"	Galt MacDermot, James Rado, Gerome Ragni	Suitable For Framing, June 1969	3:11
3.	"Mama Told Me (Not to Come)"	Randy Newman	It Ain't Easy, March 1970	3:19
4.	"Eli's Coming"	Laura Nyro	Suitable For Framing	2:40
5.	"Your Song"	Elton John, Bernie Taupin	It Ain't Easy	4:01
6.	"Celebrate"	Gary Bonner, Alan Gordon	Suitable For Framing	3:13

Side 2
No.	Title	Writer(s)	Original album	Length
1.	"One Man Band"	Billy Fox, January Tyme, Tommy Kaye	Naturally, November 1970	2:49
2.	"Out In The Country"	Roger Nichols, Paul Williams	It Ain't Easy	3:08
3.	"Nobody"	Dick Cooper, Ernie Shelby, Beth Beatty	Three Dog Night	2:18
4.	"Woman"	Andy Fraser, Paul Rodgers	It Ain't Easy	4:40
5.	"Don't Make Promises"	Tim Hardin	Three Dog Night	2:45
6.	"Try A Little Tenderness"	Jimmy Campbell, Reginald Connelly, Harry M. Woods	Three Dog Night	4:05

== Personnel ==
- Danny Hutton – vocals
- Chuck Negron – vocals
- Cory Wells – vocals
- Mike Allsup – guitar
- Joe Schermie – bass
- Jimmy Greenspoon – keyboards
- Floyd Sneed – drums

Production

- Producers: Gabriel Mekler, Richard Podolor
- Recording Engineers: Richard Podolor, Bill Cooper/American Recording Company
- Photography: Ed Caraeff
- Art Direction: Peter Whorf Graphics

== Charts ==
Chart (1971)	Peak position
Australia (Kent Music Report)	37
US Pop Albums	5

== Certifications ==
Region	Certification	Certified units/sales
United States (RIAA)	Gold	500,000^{^}
^{^} Shipments figures based on certification alone.
