= Tom Scott (saxophonist) =

American jazz musician (born 1948)

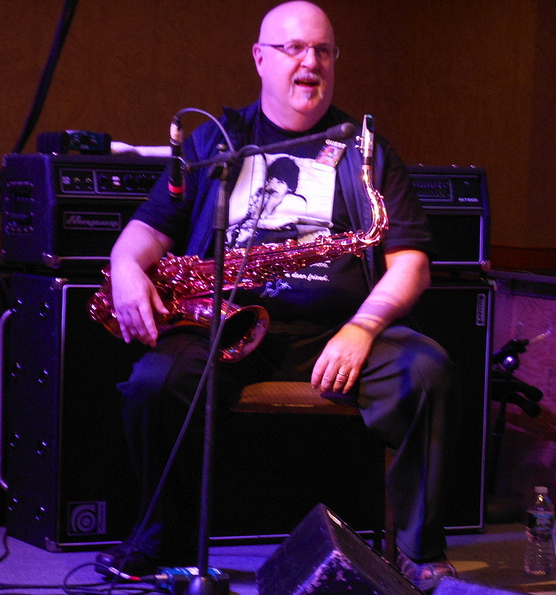
- Scott at a Beatles convention in 2013

Background information
- Born: Thomas Wright Scott; May 19, 1948 (age 78); Los Angeles, California, U.S.
- Genres: Jazz; blues; rock; pop
- Occupations: Musician; composer; arranger
- Instrument: Saxophone
- Years active: 1965–present
- Labels: Impulse!; Flying Dutchman; A&M; Ode; Columbia; Elektra; Atlantic; GRP
- Formerly of: L.A. Express, The Blues Brothers
- Website: tomscottmusic.com

Thomas Wright Scott (born May 19, 1948) is an American saxophonist, composer, and arranger. He was a member of the Blues Brothers and led the jazz fusion group L.A. Express.

== Early life, family and education ==
Scott was born in Los Angeles, California, US. He is the son of film and television composer Nathan Scott, who had more than 850 television credits and more than 100 film credits as a composer, orchestrator, and conductor, including music for Dragnet and Lassie.

== Career ==
Tom Scott's career began as a teenager as leader of the jazz ensemble Neoteric Trio, and the band Men of Note. After that, he worked as a session musician. In 1970, Quincy Jones said of him: "Tom Scott, the saxophonist; he's 21, and out of sight! Plays any idiom you can name, and blows like crazy on half a dozen horns."

Scott wrote the theme tunes for the television shows Starsky and Hutch and The Streets of San Francisco. In 1974, with the L.A. Express, he composed the score for the adult animated movie The Nine Lives of Fritz the Cat. Also, Scott arranged Barbra Streisand’s 1974 LP “ButterFly,” which went Gold. He also played the soprano saxophone solo on the number-one hit single "Listen to What the Man Said" by the band Wings. In 1976, he played the theme "I Still Can't Sleep" in Taxi Driver. He played the featured Lyricon solo on Captain & Tennille’s 1979 hit “Do That To Me One More Time,” which went #1. Scott also composed the soundtrack for 1980's Stir Crazy. In 1982, he collaborated with Johnny Mathis on "Without Us," the theme to the 1980s sitcom Family Ties and was the opening act for Olivia Newton John on her 1982 Physical North American Tour. He also played the lyricon, an electronic wind instrument on Michael Jackson's "Billie Jean", as well as lyricon and saxophone on Grateful Dead's album Terrapin Station.

Scott was a founding member of the Blues Brothers Band, despite his absence in the two films, The Blues Brothers and Blues Brothers 2000. According to Bob Woodward's account in Wired, a biography of John Belushi, Scott left the band after their 1980 tour over a salary dispute. However, he reunited with Dan Aykroyd and the Blues Brothers Band in 1988 to record a few tracks for The Great Outdoors.

Scott led the house band on two short-lived late-night talk shows: The Pat Sajak Show in 1989 and The Chevy Chase Show in 1993. From 1995 to 1998, Scott provided the main title arrangement and additional music for the television series Cybill. He was music director for the 68th Academy Awards in 1996, several Emmy Awards telecasts from 1996 to 2007, Ebony's 50th Birthday Celebration, and the People's Choice Awards telecasts.

He has dozens of solo recordings for which he collected 13 Grammy nominations (three of which he won). He has numerous film and television scoring credits, including composing and conducting the score for the film Conquest of the Planet of the Apes, and appeared on records by the Beach Boys, Blondie ("Rapture"), Grateful Dead, George Harrison, Whitney Houston ("Saving All My Love for You"), Quincy Jones, Carole King, Richard Marx ("Children of the Night"), Paul McCartney, Joni Mitchell, Eddie Money, Olivia Newton-John, Pink Floyd, Helen Reddy, Frank Sinatra, Steely Dan ("Black Cow"), Steppenwolf, and Rod Stewart ("Da Ya Think I'm Sexy?").

He produced two albums for tenor vocalist Daniel Rodriguez. The Spirit of America has sold over 400,000 copies. Scott is also a member of the Les Deux Love Orchestra and has conducted over 30 symphony orchestras around the U.S. as music director for Rodriguez. A portion of his song "Today," from his debut album The Honeysuckle Breeze, is used as the main sample for the hip-hop classic "They Reminisce Over You (T.R.O.Y.)" by Pete Rock & CL Smooth.

== Discography ==
=== As leader/co-leader ===
- The Honeysuckle Breeze (Impulse!, 1967)
- Rural Still Life (Impulse!, 1969)
- Hair to Jazz (Flying Dutchman, 1970)
- Great Scott (A&M, 1972)
- Tom Scott in L.A. (Flying Dutchman, 1975)
- New York Connection (Ode, 1975)
- Blow It Out (Ode, 1976 [1977])
- Intimate Strangers (Columbia, 1978)
- Street Beat (Columbia, 1979)
- Apple Juice (Columbia, 1981) – live
- Desire (Elektra/Musician, 1982)
- Target (Atlantic, 1983)
- One Night – One Day (Soundwings, 1986)
- Streamlines (GRP, 1987)
- Flashpoint (GRP, 1988)
- Them Changes with "The Pat Sajak Show" house band (GRP, 1990)
- Keep This Love Alive (GRP, 1991)
- Born Again (GRP, 1992)
- Reed My Lips (GRP, 1994)
- Night Creatures (GRP, 1995)
- New Found Freedom (Higher Octave, 2002)
- Bebop United (MCG Jazz, 2006) – live
- Telling Stories with Paulette McWilliams (Reviver, 2012)

=== Soundtracks ===
- Paint Your Wagon (Flying Dutchman, 1970)
- Conquest of the Planet of the Apes (1972)
- Bill Harris, Uptown Saturday Night (Warner Bros., 1975)
- Bernard Herrmann, Taxi Driver (Arista, 1976) – featured saxophone soloist
- V.A., The Original Soundtrack From The Motion Picture "Stir Crazy" (Posse, 1981)
- Hanky Panky (1982 film)
- Randy Newman, Toy Story 2 (Walt Disney, 1999) – 1 track
- Standing in the Shadows of Motown (Artisan Entertainment, 2002)Shotgun, Gerald Levert

=== As a member ===
The L.A. Express

- Tom Scott and The L.A. Express (Ode, 1974)
- Tom Cat (Ode, 1975)
- Tom Scott and The L.A. Express - Bluestreak (GRP, 1996)
- Smokin' Section (Windham Hill, 1999)

The Blues Brothers

- Briefcase Full of Blues (Atlantic, 1978) – live
- Made in America (Atlantic, 1980) – live
- Best of The Blues Brothers (Atlantic, 1981) – compilation
- Dancin' wid da Blues Brothers (Atlantic, 1983) – compilation
- Everybody Needs the Blues Brothers (Atlantic, 1988) – compilation
- The Very Best of The Blues Brothers (Atlantic, 1995) – compilation

The GRP All-Star Big Band

- GRP All-Star Big Band (GRP, 1992)
- Dave Grusin Presents GRP All-Star Big Band Live! (GRP, 1993) – live
- All Blues (GRP, 1995)

=== As sideman ===
With Joan Baez

- Gracias a la Vida (A&M, 1974)
- Diamonds & Rust (A&M, 1975)
- Blowin' Away (Portrait, 1977)

With Glen Campbell

- Rhinestone Cowboy (Capitol, 1975)
- Bloodline (Capitol, 1976)

With The Carpenters

- Now and Then (A&M, 1973)
- Passage (A&M, 1977)
- Made in America (A&M, 1981)

With Natalie Cole

- Everlasting (Elektra, 1987)
- Good to Be Back (EMI, 1989)

With Christopher Cross

- Another Page (Warner Bros., 1983)
- Back of My Mind (Warner Bros., 1988)

With Neil Diamond

- Tap Root Manuscript (Uni, 1970)
- Beautiful Noise (Columbia, 1976)
- I'm Glad You're Here with Me Tonight (Columbia, 1977)

With Donovan

- Essence to Essence (Epic, 1973)
- Slow Down World (Epic, 1976)

With Don Ellis

- Don Ellis Orchestra 'Live' at Monterey! (Pacific Jazz, 1966)
- Live in 3 2/3/4 Time (Pacific Jazz, 1967)
- Pieces of Eight: Live at UCLA (2006) – rec. 1967

With Dan Fogelberg

- Phoenix (Epic, 1979)
- The Innocent Age (Epic, 1981)
- Windows and Walls (Epic, 1984)
- No Resemblance Whatsoever (Giant, 1995)

With George Harrison

- Dark Horse (Apple, 1974)
- Extra Texture (Read All About It) (Apple, 1975)
- Thirty Three & 1/3 (Dark Horse, 1976)
- Somewhere in England (Dark Horse, 1981)

With Richard "Groove" Holmes

- Welcome Home (World Pacific, 1968)
- Six Million Dollar Man (RCA/Flying Dutchman, 1975)

With Rickie Lee Jones

- Rickie Lee Jones (Warner Bros., 1979)
- Pirates (Warner Bros., 1981)

With Carole King

- Fantasy (Ode, 1973)
- Wrap Around Joy (Ode, 1974)
- Thoroughbred (Ode, 1976)
- Simple Things (Capitol, 1977)

With Barry Manilow

- If I Should Love Again (Arista, 1981)
- Swing Street (Arista, 1987)

With Michael McDonald

- If That's What It Takes (Warner Bros., 1982)
- Wide Open (BMG, 2017)

With Joni Mitchell

- For the Roses (Asylum, 1972)
- Court and Spark (Asylum, 1974) – rec. 1973
- Miles of Aisles (Asylum, 1974) – live
- Hejira (Asylum, 1976)

With Eddie Money

- Eddie Money (Columbia, 1977)
- Life for the Taking (Columbia, 1978)

With Oliver Nelson

- Live from Los Angeles (Impulse!, 1967)
- Soulful Brass with Steve Allen (Impulse!, 1968)

With Juice Newton

- Quiet Lies (Capitol, 1982)
- Dirty Looks (Capitol, 1983)
- Old Flame (RCA, 1985)

With Randy Newman

- Born Again (Reprise, 1979)
- Bad Love (DreamWorks, 1999)

With Dolly Parton

- Dolly, Dolly, Dolly (RCA Victor, 1981)
- Heartbreak Express (RCA, 1982)
- Real Love (RCA, 1985)
- Rainbow (CBS, 1987)

With Minnie Riperton

- Adventures in Paradise (Epic, 1975)
- Minnie (Capitol, 1979)
- Love Lives Forever (Capitol, 1980)

With Johnny Rivers

- New Lovers and Old Friends (Epic, 1975)
- Outside Help (Soul City, 1977)

With Howard Roberts

- 1968: The Magic Band – Live at Dontes (V.S.O.P., 1995) – live
- 1968: The Magic Band II (V.S.O.P., 1998)

With Lalo Schifrin

- Che! (soundtrack) (Tetragrammaton, 1969) – soundtrack
- Rock Requiem (Verve, 1971)

With Boz Scaggs

- Silk Degrees (Columbia, 1976)
- Fade into Light (MVP Japan, 1996)

With Rod Stewart

- Blondes Have More Fun (Warner Bros., 1978)
- Soulbook (J, 2009)

With Barbra Streisand

- ButterFly (Columbia, 1974)
- Wet (Columbia, 1979)
- The Movie Album (Columbia, 2003)

With Gábor Szabó

- Light My Fire with Bob Thiele (Impulse!, 1967)
- Macho (Salvation, 1975)

With Steely Dan

- 1976–77: Aja (ABC, 1977)
- 1978–80: Gaucho (MCA, 1980)

With Tina Turner

- Tina Turns the Country On! (United Artists, 1974)
- Acid Queen (United Artists, 1975)

With Jimmy Webb

- Words and Music (Reprise, 1970)
- And So: On (Reprise, 1971)

With Paul Williams

- Just an Old Fashioned Love Song (AM, 1971)
- Life Goes On (AM, 1972)
- Here Comes Inspiration (AM, 1974)
- A Little Bit of Love (AM, 1974)

With jschlatt

- A Very 1999 Christmas (2024)

With others

- Joe Byrd and the Field Hippies, The American Metaphysical Circus (Sony, 1969)
- Tim Buckley, Sefronia (Discreet, 1973)
- Victor Feldman, Seven Steps to Heaven (Choice, 1973)
- Robbie Williams, Swings Both Ways (Universal, 2013)
- Tom Waits, The Heart of Saturday Night (Asylum, 1974)
- Eric Carmen, Boats Against the Current (Arista, 1977)
- Lulu, Lulu (Polydor, 1973)
- Alphonse Mouzon, The Man Incognito (Blue Note, 1976) – rec. 1975
- Dalbello, Lisa Dal Bello (MCA, 1977)
- Richie Havens, Mirage (A&M, 1977)
- Ben Sidran, The Cat and the Hat (A&M, 1979)
- Michael Jackson, Thriller (Epic, 1982)
- Whitney Houston, Whitney Houston (Arista, 1985)
- George Benson, Songs and Stories (Concord, 2009)
- Stephen Bishop, Bish (ABC, 1978)
- Michael Franks, Michael Franks (Brut, 1973)
- Michael Bublé, To Be Loved (Reprise, 2013)
- Peter Allen, Not the Boy Next Door (Arista, 1983)
- Joe Cocker, Hymn for My Soul (EMI, 2007)
- Sara Bareilles, Kaleidoscope Heart (Epic, 2010)
- Josh Groban, Awake (143, 2006)
- Frankie Valli, Frankie Valli... Is the Word (Warner Bros., 1978)
- Kenny Rankin, Professional Dreamer (Private Music, 1995)
- Billy Preston, Music Is My Life (A&M, 1972)
- Aretha Franklin, You (Atlantic, 1975)
- Art Garfunkel, Fate for Breakfast (Columbia, 1979)
- Oleta Adams, Evolution (Fontana, 1993)
- Peggy Lee, Mirrors (A&M, 1975)
- Diane Schuur, Love Songs (GRP, 1993)
- Thelma Houston, I've Got the Music in Me (Sheffield Lab, 1975)
- Bill Plummer, Cosmic Brotherhood (1968)
- Phoebe Snow, Something Real (Elektra, 1989)
- Jaco Pastorius, Word of Mouth (Warner Bros., 1981)
- Al Jarreau, Breakin' Away (Warner Bros., 1981)
- Richard Marx, Repeat Offender (Capitol, 1989)
- Bernie Taupin, He Who Rides the Tiger (Elektra, 1980)
- Deniece Williams, Hot on the Trail (Columbia, 1986)
- Sarah Vaughan, Brazilian Romance (CBS, 1987)
- Helen Reddy, Music, Music (Capitol, 1976)
- Olivia Newton-John, Soul Kiss (Mercury, 1985)
- Otis Spann, Sweet Giant of the Blues (BluesTime, 1970)
- Ringo Starr, Ringo (Apple, 1973)
- Bob Thiele Emergency, Head Start (Flying Dutchman, 1969)
- Splinter, Harder to Live (Dark Horse, 1975)
