= Harmony (Three Dog Night album) =

Album by Three Dog Night

Studio album by Three Dog Night
- Released: September 30, 1971
- Studios: American Recording Co., Studio City, California
- Length: 36:08
- Label: Dunhill
- Producer: Richard Podolor

Three Dog Night chronology
Golden Bisquits (1971)	Harmony (1971)	Seven Separate Fools (1972)

Singles from Harmony
- 1. "An Old Fashioned Love Song" Released: November 1971; 2. "Never Been to Spain" Released: January 1972; 3. "The Family of Man" Released: March 1972

Professional ratings
Review scores
Source	Rating
AllMusic	3/5 stars
Christgau's Record Guide	B+
Tom Hull	B

Harmony is the fifth studio album by American rock band Three Dog Night, released in 1971 (see 1971 in music). The album featured two Top 10 hits: "An Old Fashioned Love Song" (U.S. #4) and a cover version of Hoyt Axton's "Never Been to Spain" (U.S. #5).

== Critical reception ==
Reviewing in Christgau's Record Guide: Rock Albums of the Seventies (1981), Robert Christgau wrote: "Next to Grand Funk, they're the country's top touring act, and they sell singles in the multiple millions besides. They're slick as Wesson Oil. And when they choose the right material and go light on the minstrel-show theatrics, they're fine—next to 'Maggie May,' 'Joy to the World' is the most durable single of the year. Their albums do vary—avoid the 'Joy to the World' vehicle Naturally—but I think this is the best. Even if you're hostile, you'll have to concede that any group that can string together great-but-obscure songs from Marvin Gaye, Joni Mitchell, and Moby Grape without inspiring a rush back to the originals has something going for it. Wish they'd cut the poetry reading, though."

== Track listing ==
1. "Never Been to Spain" (Hoyt Axton) – 3:43
2. "My Impersonal Life" (Terry Furlong) – 4:22
3. "An Old Fashioned Love Song" (Paul Williams) – 3:21
4. "Never Dreamed You'd Leave in Summer" (Stevie Wonder, Syreeta Wright) – 3:41
5. "Jam" (Three Dog Night) – 3:47
6. "You" (Jeffrey Bowen, Jack Goga, Ivy Jo Hunter) – 3:00
7. "Night in the City" (Joni Mitchell) – 3:13
8. "Murder in My Heart for the Judge" (Jerry Miller, Don Stevenson) – 3:36
9. "The Family of Man" (Jack Conrad, Paul Williams) – 3:28
10. "Intro: Poem: Mistakes and Illusions" (poem by Paula Negron) / "Peace of Mind" (Nick Woods) – 3:03

== Personnel ==
- Michael Allsup – guitar
- Jimmy Greenspoon – keyboards
- Danny Hutton – lead vocals (tracks 2, 7, 9), background vocals
- Chuck Negron – lead vocals (tracks 3, 4, 6, 9), background vocals
- Joe Schermie – bass
- Floyd Sneed – drums
- Cory Wells – lead vocals (tracks 1, 8, 9), background vocals

Production

- Richard Podolor – producer
- Bill Cooper – engineer
- Ed Caraeff – photography

== Charts ==
Album – Billboard (United States)

Chart (1971/72)	Peak position
Australia (Kent Music Report)	32
USA Pop Albums	8

Singles – Billboard (United States)

Year	Single	Chart	Position
1971	"An Old Fashioned Love Song" (Alternate mix)	Pop Singles	4
1971	"An Old Fashioned Love Song" (Alternate mix)	Easy Listening	1
1971	"Never Been to Spain"	Pop Singles	5
1972	"Never Been to Spain"	Easy Listening	18
1972	"The Family of Man"	Pop Singles	12
1972	"The Family of Man"	Easy Listening	27

== Certifications ==
Region	Certification	Certified units/sales
United States (RIAA)	Gold	500,000^{^}
^{^} Shipments figures based on certification alone.
