= Just an Old Fashioned Love Song =

Studio album by Paul Williams
- Released: 1971
- Studio: A&M (Hollywood, California); Sunset Sound (Los Angeles, California)
- Genre: Pop
- Label: A&M
- Producer: Michael James Jackson

Paul Williams chronology
Someday Man (1970)	Just an Old Fashioned Love Song (1971)	Life Goes On (1972)

Professional ratings
Review scores
Source	Rating
AllMusic	4.5/5 stars

Just an Old Fashioned Love Song is a studio album by Paul Williams, released in 1971. Notable songs from the album, which were hits for other artists, include "(Just An) Old Fashioned Love Song", "We've Only Just Begun", "Let Me Be the One" and "When I Was All Alone".

== Track listing ==
All tracks composed by Paul Williams; except where indicated

1. "Waking Up Alone"
2. "I Never Had It So Good" (Paul Williams, Roger Nichols)
3. "We've Only Just Begun" (Paul Williams, Roger Nichols)
4. "That's Enough for Me"
5. "A Perfect Love"
6. "(Just An) Old Fashioned Love Song"
7. "Let Me Be the One" (Paul Williams, Roger Nichols)
8. "Simple Man" (Graham Nash)
9. "When I Was All Alone"
10. "My Love and I"
11. "Gone Forever"

== Personnel ==
- Paul Williams – vocals
- Craig Doerge – acoustic piano, electric piano (9)
- Leland Sklar – bass guitar (1–7,10,11)
- Russ Kunkel – drums (1–4,10), congas (4,7,10,11), tambourine (2,10)
- David Spinozza – acoustic guitar (1,3–5,7,9,10), electric guitar (2,6,10,11)
- Michael Utley – organ (1,5,8,10,11)
- Bobbye Hall Porter – congas (1), percussion (4)
- Tom Scott – tenor saxophone (1,10), flute (5,6,9) clarinet (6)
- Gene Cipriano – oboe (1), tenor saxophone (6), woodwinds (4)
- Paul Shure – first violin (5,8,9)
- Marv Limonick – second violin (5,8,9)
- Milt Thomas – viola (5,8,9)
- Edgar Lustgarten – cello (5,8,9)
- Joe Mondragon – bass guitar (3), double bass (8)
- Dick Hyde – tuba (6)
- Jack Conrad – bass (9)
- Rick Marotta – drums (9)
- Teddy Boy Friesen, Daffy Jackson, The Hobbit – kazoo (6)
- Bob Brookmeyer – trombone (1)
- Al Aarons – trumpet (1)

Technical

- Bruce Botnick, Dick Bogert, Hank Cicalo, Norm Kinney, Robert Appère, Tommy Vicari – engineer
- Chuck Beeson, Junie Osaki – art direction
- Jim McCrary – photography

== Charts ==
Chart (1972)	Peak position
Australia (Kent Music Report)	22
US Billboard 200	141
