= Free and Easy =

Free and Easy may refer to:

- Free and Easy (1930 film), starring Buster Keaton
- Free and Easy (1941 film), starring Robert Cummings
- Free and Easy (1959 blues opera), by Harold Arlen
- Free and Easy (2016 film), a Hong Kong film
- "Free and Easy (Down the Road I Go)", a 2006 song co-written and recorded by Dierks Bentley
- "Free & Easy" (Ayumi Hamasaki song), a 2002 song co-written and performed by Ayumi Hamasaki
- Free and Easy (album), a 1974 album by Helen Reddy
- Free and easy, a type of song and supper room in early 19th-century England
