= Bobby's Girl (album) =

Studio album by Aileen Quinn
- Released: November 16, 1982 (U.S.)
- Recorded: August–September 1982
- Studios: Mediasound, New York City; Lion Share, Los Angeles
- Genre: Pop
- Labels: Columbia; ARC 38378 (1982 CBS Inc.)
- Producer: Gary Klein

Bobby's Girl is the debut solo album by Aileen Quinn. It was released on cassette and LP in November 1982 by Columbia Records (ARC-38378), six months after her debut film Annie was released in theaters.

The title song of the album is a cover of the 1962 Marcie Blane hit, "Bobby's Girl". The album also features "The Great Big Difference", a song written for Quinn about a child's perspective on divorce.

Backing tracks were recorded at Lion Share Studios in Hollywood in August 1982. Aileen overdubbed her vocals at the Mediasound Studios in New York City in September 1982. The LP was released on November 16, 1982.

== Tracklist ==
1. "Songs" (Dennis Scott) - 3:27
2. "We Don't Know Why" (Michael Smotherman) - 4:26
3. "Spread Some Love (Love is All Around)" (Allen Toussaint) - 4:00
4. "You Make Me Feel Like Dancing" (Leo Sayer, Vini Poncia) - 3:46
5. "I'm Going to Go Back There Someday" (Kenneth Ascher, Paul Williams) - 2:44
6. "(I Wanna Be) Bobby's Girl" (Henry Hoffman, Gary Klein) - 2:50
7. "The Great Big Difference" (Michael Smotherman) - 3:49
8. "Keep On Singing" (Bobby Hart, Danny Janssen) - 3:17
9. "Give a Little Love" (Henry Gaffney) - 2:48
10. "Nothing Quite Like Love" (Michael Smotherman) - 3:30

== Personnel ==
- Aileen Quinn: Vocals
- Michael Landau, Buzz Feiten: Guitars
- Jai Winding: Piano
- Robbie Buchanan: Synthesizers
- Nathan East: Bass
- Rick Shlosser: Drums
- Steve Foreman: Percussion
