= Keep On Singing =

Early 1970s hit song

"Keep on Singing"
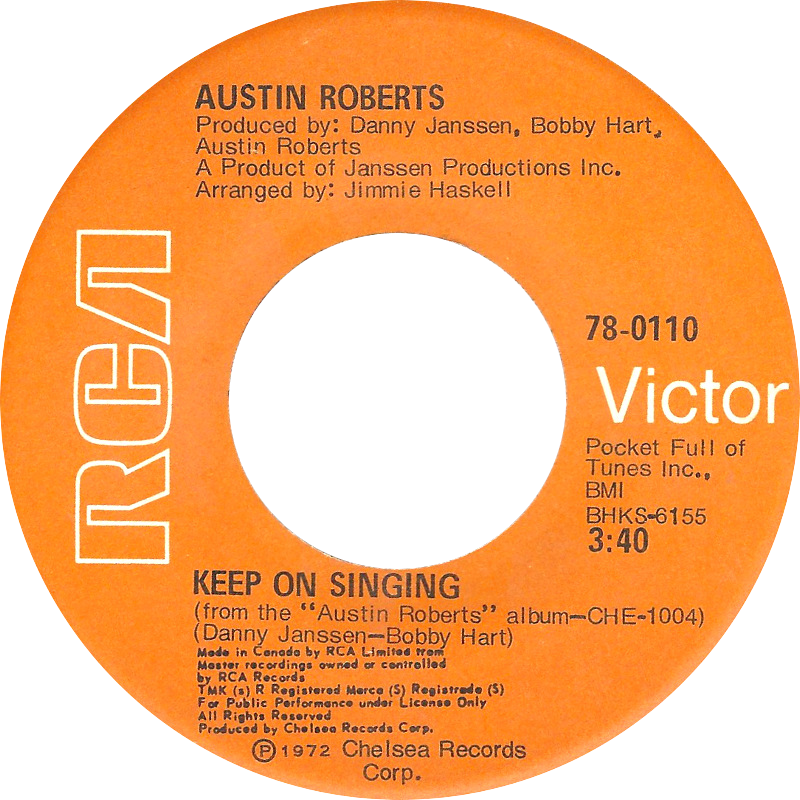
- Side A of the Canadian single

Single by Austin Roberts

from the album Austin Roberts
- B-side: "Take Away the Sunshine"
- Released: January 1973
- Label: Chelsea
- Songwriters: Danny Janssen, Bobby Hart

Austin Roberts singles chronology
"Something's Wrong With Me" (1972)	"Keep on Singing" (1973)	"The Last Thing on My Mind" (1973)

"Keep on Singing" is a 1973 song composed by Danny Janssen and Bobby Hart, and was originally recorded by Austin Roberts from the album Austin Roberts. It was released as a single on Chelsea Records and reached No. 50 on the U.S. Billboard Hot 100 and No. 39 on the Cash Box Top 100. In Canada it reached # 79. "Keep on Singing" was best known as a hit single by Helen Reddy in 1974.

== Chart performance ==
Chart (1973)	Peak position
Australia (Kent Music Report)	46
Canada RPM Top Singles	79
Canada RPM Adult Contemporary	22
U.S. Billboard Hot 100	50
U.S. Billboard Easy Listening	22
U.S. Cash Box	39

== Helen Reddy version ==
"Keep on Singing"
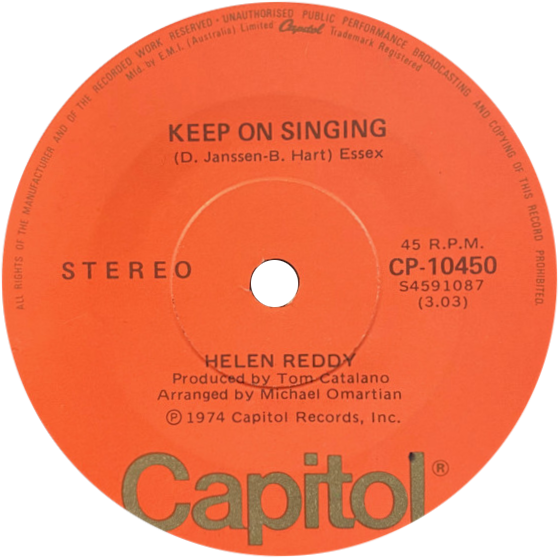
- Side A of the Australian single

Single by Helen Reddy

from the album Love Song for Jeffrey
- B-side: "You're My Home"
- Released: February 1974
- Recorded: 1974
- Length: 3:03
- Label: Capitol
- Songwriters: Danny Janssen, Bobby Hart
- Producer: Tom Catalano

Helen Reddy singles chronology
"Leave Me Alone (Ruby Red Dress)" (1973)	"Keep on Singing" (1974)	"You and Me Against the World" (1974)

Helen Reddy recorded the song for her 1974 album Love Song for Jeffrey. It served as the lead single from the album and reached No. 15 on the Billboard Hot 100 that May, and No. 10 on the Cash Box Top 100. The song also reached No. 10 in Canada. The B-side of Reddy's lead single was a cover version of Billy Joel's "You're My Home".

"Keep On Singing" was a yet greater Adult Contemporary hit, reaching No. 1 on both the U.S. and Canadian Easy Listening charts. The song was also a hit in Australia, peaking at No. 22.

=== Chart performance ===
==== Weekly charts ====
Chart (1974)	Peak position
Australia (Go-Set)	25
Australia ARIA	22
Canada RPM Top Singles	10
Canada RPM Adult Contemporary	1
New Zealand (Listener)	17
U.S. Billboard Hot 100	15
U.S. Billboard Easy Listening	1
U.S. Cash Box Top 100	10

==== Year-end charts ====
Chart (1974)	Rank
Canada RPM Top Singles	118
U.S. Billboard Hot 100	135

== Other cover versions ==
- Terry Williams of The First Edition cut it as a B-side for MGM Records in 1973.
- Barbara Mandrell covered "Keep on Singing" for her 1974 This Time I Almost Made It album.
- The song appears on Aileen Quinn's 1982 album Bobby's Girl.
- A live version of "Keep on Singing" is featured on the 1976 Live in Japan album by Dolenz, Jones, Boyce & Hart.
- A Finnish rendering: "Anna Laulun Lohduttaa", was recorded by Ami Aspelund for her 1974 Ami album.
- The Wynners
