= The Family of Man (Three Dog Night song) =

Three Dog Night song

Single by Three Dog Night

from the album Harmony
- B-side: "Going in Circles"
- Released: March 1972
- Genre: Rock
- Length: 3:28 (album version); 3:11 (single version)
- Label: Dunhill 4306
- Songwriters: Paul Williams, Jack Conrad
- Producer: Richard Podolor

Three Dog Night singles chronology
"Never Been to Spain" (1971)	"The Family of Man" (1972)	"Black and White" (1972)

"The Family of Man" is a song written by Paul Williams and Jack Conrad, produced by Richard Podolor. It was most famously performed by Three Dog Night and featured on their 1971 album, Harmony.

In the US, "The Family of Man" reached #12 on the Hot 100 in May 1972 and #27 on the U.S. adult contemporary chart. Outside of the US, "The Family of Man" peaked at #5 in Canada.

== Personnel ==
- Michael Allsup – guitar
- Jimmy Greenspoon – keyboards
- Danny Hutton – lead vocals (first verse), background vocals
- Chuck Negron – lead vocals (2nd verse and fade out), background vocals
- Joe Schermie – bass
- Floyd Sneed – drums
- Cory Wells – lead vocals (3rd verse), background vocals

== Other versions ==
- Williams released a version of the song on his 1974 album, A Little Bit of Love.
- Reg Livermore performed the song in his one-man show Betty Blokk-buster Follies, and his live recording is included in the album and film of that show.
