= It Ain't Easy (Three Dog Night album) =

Studio album by Three Dog Night
- Released: March 31, 1970
- Recorded: 1969–70
- Studio: American Recording Co., Studio City, California
- Length: 32:24
- Label: Dunhill; MCA; Probe
- Producer: Richard Podolor

Three Dog Night chronology
Captured Live at the Forum (1969)	It Ain't Easy (1970)	Naturally (1970)

Original "Wizards of Orange" Cover

Singles from It Ain't Easy
- 1. "Mama Told Me (Not to Come)" Released: May 1970; 2. "Out in the Country" Released: 1970

It Ain't Easy is the third studio album by American rock band Three Dog Night, released in 1970.

== Title and packaging ==
According to lead singer Chuck Negron's book Three Dog Nightmare, the album's working title was The Wizards of Orange, with a cover featuring the band's members wearing orange make-up and posing in the nude. The band's record company, ABC/Dunhill, rejected the original album title and cover art, although some configurations of their first "greatest hits" album, 1971's Golden Bisquits, would later be packaged using It Ain't Easy's original cover photo.

== Critical reception ==
Professional ratings
Review scores
Source	Rating
AllMusic	link
Christgau's Record Guide	B
Tom Hull	B

Reviewing in Christgau's Record Guide: Rock Albums of the Seventies (1981), Robert Christgau wrote: "Admitting it won't gain me any of the hip cachet I crave, but I admired and enjoyed this group's first LP. I found the second mediocre and the live job that followed it wretchedly excessive, but this one—their fourth in just fourteen months—gets back: exemplary song-finding and not too much plastic-soul melon-mouthing or preening vocal pyrotechnique. Highlights: the hit version of Randy Newman's 'Mama Told Me Not to Come,' with just the right admixture of high-spirited schlock to turn it into the AM giant it deserves to be, and a departure from pre-Beatles times called "Good Feeling (1957)."

== Track listing ==
=== Side one ===
1. "Woman" (Andy Fraser, Paul Rodgers) – 4:40
2. "Cowboy" (Randy Newman) – 3:42
3. "It Ain't Easy" (Ron Davies) – 2:46
4. "Out in the Country" (Roger Nichols, Paul Williams) – 3:08
5. "Good Feeling (1957)" (Alan Brackett, John Merrill) – 3:46

=== Side two ===
1. "Rock and Roll Widow" (Danny Hutton, Chuck Negron, Cory Wells, Mike Allsup, Jimmy Greenspoon, Joe Schermie, Floyd Sneed) – 2:56
2. "Mama Told Me (Not to Come)" (Newman) – 3:18
3. "Your Song" (Elton John, Bernie Taupin) – 4:01
4. "Good Time Living" (Barry Mann, Cynthia Weil) – 4:06

== Personnel ==
=== Musicians ===
- Cory Wells – lead vocals (tracks A1, A3, B2, A4-group unison), background vocals
- Chuck Negron – lead vocals (tracks A2, A5, A4-group unison), background vocals
- Danny Hutton – lead vocals (track B3, A4-group unison), background vocals
- Mike Allsup – guitar
- Joe Schermie – bass guitar
- Floyd Sneed – drums
- Jimmy Greenspoon – keyboards

=== Production ===
- Producer: Richard Podolor
- Engineer: Bill Cooper
- Arranger: Three Dog Night
- Roadie, lighting: Dennis Albro
- Roadie, sound: Lee Carlton
- Cal Schenkel – design
- Ed Caraeff – photography

== Charts ==
Album – Billboard (United States)

Year	Chart	Position
1970	Pop Albums	8

Singles – Billboard (United States)

Year	Single	Chart	Position
1970	"Mama Told Me (Not to Come)"	Pop Singles	1
1970	"Out in the Country"	Pop Singles	15
1970	"Out in the Country"	Easy Listening	11

== Certifications ==
Region	Certification	Certified units/sales
United States (RIAA)	Gold	500,000^{^}
^{^} Shipments figures based on certification alone.
