= Someday Man =

Studio album by Paul Williams
- Released: May 1970
- Genre: Pop
- Length: 27:59
- Label: Reprise
- Producer: Roger Nichols

Paul Williams chronology
Someday Man (1970)	Just an Old Fashioned Love Song (1971)

Professional ratings
Review scores
Source	Rating
Allmusic	4.5/5 stars

Someday Man is the debut studio album by American singer-songwriter Paul Williams, released in 1970 by Reprise Records. The song "Someday Man", written by Williams and Roger Nichols, was first released by the Monkees (sung by Davy Jones) on their 1969 single "Listen to the Band" b/w "Someday Man". Chuck Kaye was credited for direction.

In 2018, the album was re-issued on vinyl by Ship to Shore Phono Co. The deluxe package included two bonus tracks, plus new liner notes by Williams, Nichols and Richard Barone.

== Track listing ==
All music composed by Roger Nichols; all lyrics written by Paul Williams.

Side one
No.	Title	Length
1.	"Someday Man"	2:45
2.	"So Many People"	2:11
3.	"She's Too Good to Me"	2:09
4.	"Mornin' I'll Be Movin' On"	2:38
5.	"Time"	2:47
Total length:		12:30

Side two
No.	Title	Length
1.	"Trust"	2:43
2.	"To Put Up with You"	2:48
3.	"Do You Really Have a Heart"	2:43
4.	"I Know You"	2:34
5.	"Roan Pony"	2:37
Total length:		13:25

== Personnel ==
- Guitar: David Cohen, Mike Deasy, Roger Nichols, Chad Stuart
- Bass: Jack Conrad, Roger Nichols, Joe Osborn
- Keyboards: Larry Knechtel, Lincoln Mayorga, Roger Nichols
- Drums: Hal Blaine, Earl Palmer
