= Love Song for Jeffrey =

Studio album by Helen Reddy
- Released: 25 March 1974
- Recorded: 1974
- Length: 32:03
- Label: Capitol
- Producer: Tom Catalano

Helen Reddy chronology
Long Hard Climb (1973)	Love Song for Jeffrey (1974)	Free and Easy (1974)

Singles from Love Song for Jeffrey
- 1. "Keep on Singing" Released: 25 February 1974; 2. "You and Me Against the World" Released: 27 May 1974

Professional ratings
Review scores
Source	Rating
AllMusic	2.5/5 stars
Christgau's Record Guide	B−

Love Song for Jeffrey is the fifth studio album by Australian-American pop singer Helen Reddy, released on 25 March 1974 by Capitol Records. The album focused on her family, giving special attention to those who had died within the past year. A tribute on the back cover reads: "In memory of my mother, Stella Lamond Reddy, July 1973, my father, Max Reddy, September 1973, and my beloved aunt, Helen Reddy Sr., January 1974."

The album debuted on the Billboard Top LPs & Tape chart in the issue dated 20 April 1974, and reached number 11 during its 35 weeks there. Six weeks later, on June 6, the Recording Industry Association of America awarded the album with Gold certification for sales of 500,000 copies in the United States, and in Canada it peaked at number six on RPM magazine's album chart in September of that year. On 27 January 2004, it was released for the first time on compact disc as one of two albums on one CD, the other album being her other 1974 release, Free and Easy.

== Singles ==
The first track that was selected for release from this album, "Keep On Singing", was issued on 25 February 1974, debuted on Billboard's Hot 100 shortly thereafter, in the issue of the magazine dated March 9, and peaked at number 15 during its 13 weeks there. Its first appearance on the magazine's Easy Listening chart came in the 16 March issue, and the song managed two of its 13 weeks on that list at number one. On the RPM singles chart it reached number 10.

"You and Me Against the World" was released as a single on 27 May of that year and got as high as number nine during its 20 weeks on the pop chart that began in the 15 June issue. That same issue also included its first appearance on the Easy Listening chart, where it stayed for 18 weeks, one of which was spent at number one. It also reached number nine on the Canadian singles chart. In the liner notes for the 2006 compilation The Woman I Am: The Definitive Collection, Reddy writes of this song that it is her "second-most-requested song after 'I Am Woman'. I still receive mail from people who have lost a parent or child telling me that this was 'their song'. These letters always touch me."

== Track listing ==
Side 1

1. "That Old American Dream" (Albert Hammond, Mike Hazlewood) – 2:27
2. "You're My Home" (Billy Joel) – 2:59
3. "Songs" (Barry Mann, Cynthia Weil) – 3:55
4. "I Got a Name" (Charles Fox, Norman Gimbel) – 3:32
5. "Keep On Singing" (Bobby Hart, Danny Janssen) – 3:03

Side 2

1. "You and Me Against the World" (Kenny Ascher, Paul Williams) – 3:08
2. "Ah, My Sister" (Peter Allen, Carole Bayer Sager) – 3:03
3. "Pretty, Pretty" (Peter Allen, Hal Hackady) – 3:26
4. "Love Song for Jeffrey" (Peter Allen, Helen Reddy) – 2:40
5. "Stella by Starlight" (Ned Washington, Victor Young) – 3:50

Alternate version of "Songs"

In 2009 EMI Music Special Markets released Rarities from the Capitol Vaults, a 12-track CD of mostly what were previously unreleased Reddy recordings, which included an alternate version of "Songs".

== Personnel ==
- Helen Reddy – vocals
- Tom Catalano – producer
- Artie Butler – arranger and conductor (except as noted)
- Michael Omartian – arranger and conductor (" Keep On Singing", "You're My Home")
- Armin Steiner – engineer
- Jeff Wald – management
- Virgil Mirano – cover and liner photography
- Roy Kohara – art direction

== Charts ==
Chart (1974)	Peak position
Australian Albums (Kent Music Report)	20
Canadian Albums (RPM)	6
US Billboard 200	11
