= Here Comes Inspiration =

Studio album by Paul Williams
- Released: 1974
- Recorded: A&M (Hollywood); Sound Labs (Hollywood)
- Genre: Pop
- Length: 38:54
- Label: A&M
- Producer: Kenny Ascher

Paul Williams chronology
| Life Goes On (1972) | Here Comes Inspiration (1974) | A Little Bit of Love (1974) |

Professional ratings
Review scores
| Source | Rating |
|---|---|
| AllMusic | 3/5 stars |
| Christgau's Record Guide | B− |

Here Comes Inspiration is a studio album by Paul Williams, released in 1974. Notable songs from the album include "Rainy Days & Mondays", "You & Me Against the World" and "If We Could Still Be Friends". Kenny Ascher was credited for the production, arrangements and conducting. Film composer John Williams arranged and conducted his song "Dream Away", George Tipton arranged "If We Could Still Be Friends". Clarinet was by Tom Scott, flugelhorn by Chuck Findley and percussion by Victor Feldman.

== Track listing ==
Words & music by Paul Williams; unless otherwise stated

Side One

1. "Nilsson Sings Newman" 0:54 (Paul Williams, Kenny Ascher)
2. "You and Me Against the World" 3:44 (Paul Williams, Kenny Ascher)
3. "You Know Me" 3:34 (Paul Williams, Kenny Ascher)
4. "Born to Fly" 3:03
5. "That's What Friends Are For" 3:58
6. "Rainy Days & Mondays" 3:38 (Paul Williams, Roger Nichols)

Side Two

1. "Inspiration" 3:08 (Paul Williams, Kenny Ascher)
2. "If We Could Still Be Friends" 3:02
3. "What Would They Say" 2:41
4. "Driftwood" 3:42
5. "In the Beginning" 3:37 (Paul Williams, Ron Davies)
6. "Dream Away" 4:22 (Paul Williams, Johnny Williams)

== Charts ==
| Chart (1974) | Peak position |
|---|---|
| US Billboard 200 | 165 |
