= Life Goes On (Paul Williams album) =

Studio album by Paul Williams
- Released: November 1972
- Recorded: A&M (Hollywood); Olympic (London); Sunset Sound (Los Angeles)
- Genre: Pop
- Length: 35:30
- Label: A&M
- Producer: Michael James Jackson

Paul Williams chronology
| Just an Old Fashioned Love Song (1971) | Life Goes On (1972) | Here Comes Inspiration (1974) |

Professional ratings
Review scores
| Source | Rating |
|---|---|
| AllMusic | 3/5 stars |

Life Goes On is a studio album by Paul Williams, released in 1972. Songs from the album include "I Won't Last a Day Without You" and "Out in the Country". Jackson Browne and Linda Ronstadt sang background vocals on the title track. Jimmy Webb arranged the strings on "Rose."

"Where Do I Go from Here" was selected as the ending title for Thunderbolt and Lightfoot.

== Track listing ==
All tracks composed by Paul Williams; except where indicated

Side one

1. "The Lady Is Waiting"
2. "Out in the Country" (Paul Williams, Roger Nichols)
3. "Little Girl"
4. "Rose" (Paul Williams, Mentor Williams)
5. "Where Do I Go from Here"

Side two

1. "Life Goes On" (Paul Williams, Craig Doerge)
2. "Park Avenue"
3. "I Won't Last a Day Without You" (Paul Williams, Roger Nichols)
4. "Traveling Boy" (Paul Williams, Roger Nichols)
5. "That Lucky Old Sun" (Beasley Smith, Haven Gillespie)

== Personnel ==
- Paul Williams – vocals
- David Spinozza – guitars
- Leland Sklar – bass
- Craig Doerge – piano
- Michael Utley – organ
- Russ Kunkel – drums, percussion
- Bobbye Hall – percussion
- Bob Cooper – oboe on "Little Girl"
- Danny Kortchmar – acoustic guitar on "I Won't Last a Day Without You"
- Jackson Browne, Linda Ronstadt, Gerry Beckley, Ronee Blakley – background vocals on "Life Goes On"
- Mentor Williams – background vocals on "Rose"
- Jimmy Webb – string arrangement on "Rose"

== Charts ==
| Chart (1973) | Peak position |
|---|---|
| US Billboard 200 | 159 |
