= Something's Wrong with Me =

"Something's Wrong With Me"

Single by Austin Roberts

from the album Austin Roberts
- B-side: "My Song"
- Released: October 1972
- Genre: Easy listening
- Length: 3:07
- Label: Chelsea
- Songwriters: Danny Janssen, Bobby Hart

Austin Roberts singles chronology
"Every Day in My Life with Linda" (1972)	"Something's Wrong With Me" (1972)	"Keep On Singing" (1973)

"Something's Wrong With Me" is a 1972 song composed by Danny Janssen and Bobby Hart, which became the first major hit single by Austin Roberts. It is a track from his debut album Austin Roberts.

The song was released as a single on Chelsea Records and reached No. 12 on the Billboard Hot 100 and No. 10 on the Cash Box Top 100 in the United States. In Canada, "Something's Wrong With Me" spent two weeks at No. 6.

== Chart performance ==
Chart (1972–73)	Peak position
Australia (Kent Music Report)	40
Canada RPM Top Singles	6
U.S. Billboard Hot 100	12
U.S. Billboard Easy Listening	16
U.S. Cash Box Top 100	10
