= The Honeysuckle Breeze =

Studio album by Tom Scott
- Released: 1967
- Recorded: September 18–20, 1967
- Genre: Jazz
- Length: 34:49
- Label: Impulse!
- Producer: Bob Thiele

Tom Scott chronology
The Honeysuckle Breeze (1967)	Rural Still Life (1968)

The Honeysuckle Breeze is the debut album by American jazz saxophonist Tom Scott featuring performances recorded in 1967 for the Impulse! label.

Parts of the saxophone solo in "Today" were sampled in "They Reminisce Over You," by jazz rap duo Pete Rock & CL Smooth, off their critically acclaimed 1992 album Mecca and the Soul Brother.

== Reception ==
The Allmusic review by Scott Yanow awarded the album 1½ stars stating "The dated effects, weak material, and the brevity of the performances make this a rather forgettable commercial record. Only of historical interest".

Professional ratings
Review scores
Source	Rating
Allmusic	1.5/5 stars

== Track listing ==
1. "The Honeysuckle Breeze" (Ian Freebairn-Smith) – 4:15
2. "Never My Love (Donald Addrisi, Richard Addrisi) – 3:20
3. "She's Leaving Home" (John Lennon, Paul McCartney) – 2:17
4. "Naima" (John Coltrane) – 2:45
5. "Mellow Yellow" (Donovan Leitch) – 4:15
6. "Baby, I Love You" (Jimmy Holliday, Ronnie Shannon) – 3:21
7. "Today" (Marty Balin, Paul Kantner) – 3:20
8. "North" (Joan Baez) – 4:30
9. "Blues for Hari" (Tom Scott) – 3:57
10. "Deliver Me" (Danny Moore) – 2:49

- Recorded in Los Angeles, California on September 18, 1967 (tracks 2, 3 & 10), September 19, 1967 (tracks 6–8) and September 20, 1967 (tracks 1, 4, 5 & 9)

== Personnel ==
- Tom Scott – tenor saxophone, soprano saxophone, flute
- Mike Melvoin – piano, organ, harpsichord (tracks 1–5, 9 & 10)
- Lincoln Mayorga – piano harpsichord (tracks 6–8)
- Bill Plummer – sitar
- Dennis Budimir (tracks 2, 3, 6–8 & 10), Glen Campbell (tracks 2, 3, 6–8 & 10), Louis Morell (tracks 1, 4, 5 & 9) – guitar
- Max Bennett (tracks 1, 4, 5 & 9), Carol Kaye (tracks 2, 3, 6–8 & 10) – electric bass
- Jimmy Gordon – drums
- Gene Estes (tracks 1, 4, 5 & 9), Emil Richards (tracks 2, 3 & 10) – percussion
- The California Dreamers: Ron Hicklin, Al Capps, Loren Farber, John Bahler, Tom Bahler, Ian Freebairn-Smith, Sally Stevens, Sue Allen, Jackie Ward – vocals
