= Free and Easy (album) =

Studio album by Helen Reddy
- Released: 22 October 1974
- Recorded: June – July 1974
- Studios: Hollywood Sound (Hollywood); Burbank (Los Angeles)
- Length: 33:20
- Label: Capitol
- Producer: Joe Wissert

Helen Reddy chronology
Love Song for Jeffrey (1974)	Free and Easy (1974)	No Way to Treat a Lady (1975)

Singles from Free and Easy
- 1. "Angie Baby" Released: 14 October 1974; 2. "Emotion" Released: 20 January 1975

Professional ratings
Review scores
Source	Rating
AllMusic	3/5 stars
Billboard	positive

Free and Easy is the sixth studio album by Australian-American pop singer Helen Reddy that was released in October 1974 by Capitol Records. The album included rare forays into rock ("Raised on Rock") and vaudeville ("Showbiz"). The album debuted on Billboard's Top LP's & Tapes chart in the issue dated 2 November 1974, and reached number eight during its 28 weeks there. The following month, on 18 December, the Recording Industry Association of America awarded the album with Gold certification for sales of 500,000 copies in the United States. In the UK it peaked at number 17, and in Canada's RPM magazine it got as high as number nine on its list of the top LPs in the issue dated 11 January 1975. On 27 January 2004, it was released for the first time on compact disc as one of two albums on one CD, the other album being her other 1974 release, Love Song for Jeffrey.

== Singles ==
"Angie Baby", which was released on 14 October 1974, as the first single from the album, debuted on Billboard's Hot 100 in the issue of the magazine dated 19 October, and enjoyed a week at number one over the course of its 17 weeks there. It also had one week atop the magazine's Easy Listening chart during a 13-week run that began in the issue dated 2 November. On 13 January 1975, the song earned Gold certification for sales of the one million copies that was the requirement for singles at that time, and in the issue of RPM dated 25 January of that year it peaked at number three on the Canadian singles chart. In the UK it got as high as number five during its nine weeks on the singles chart there.

A second single, "Emotion", was released on 20 January 1975, and made it to number 22 during its nine weeks on the pop chart that began in the 8 February issue. That same issue also included its first appearance on the Easy Listening chart, where it stayed for 12 weeks, one of which was spent at number one, and it also reached number 25 pop in Canada. While the album track clocks in at 4:10, the song was edited down to a 2:52 running time for the 7-inch format.

"Free and Easy" was a number-one hit in New Zealand. and was certified gold. It was also a minor hit in Australia.

== Reception ==
Billboard was very enthusiastic in its review: "Cut for cut, this is unquestionably the best Reddy LP yet. Only one or two of the songs could not be seriously pushed for a hit single. The wide-ranging choice of material is particularly effective."

== Track listing ==
Side 1

1. "Angie Baby" (Alan O'Day) – 3:29
2. "Raised on Rock" (Mark James) – 3:12
3. "I've Been Wanting You So Long" (Peter Allen, Jeff Barry) – 3:40
4. "You Have Lived" (Don McLean) – 3:48
5. "I'll Be Your Audience" (Lewis Anderson, Becky Hobbs) – 3:19

Side 2

1. "Emotion" (Patti Dahlstrom, Véronique Sanson) – 4:10
2. "Free and Easy" (Tom Jans) – 2:46
3. "Loneliness" (Kenny Ascher, Paul Williams) – 3:30
4. "I Think I'll Write a Song" (Peter Allen, Helen Reddy) – 2:22
5. "Showbiz" (Dennis Tracy) – 3:04

== Personnel ==
- Helen Reddy – vocals
- Joe Wissert – producer
- Nick DeCaro – arranger and conductor; background vocal ("Free and Easy")
- Pointer Sisters – background vocal ("Showbiz")
- Tom Perry – recording engineer
- Bruce Botnick – recording engineer
- Virgil Mirano – cover and liner photography
- Roy Kohara – art direction
- Michael Bryan – illustration

== Charts ==
Chart (1974–75)	Peak position
Australian Albums (Kent Music Report)	33
Canadian Albums Albums (RPM)	9
New Zealand Albums (RMNZ)	16
UK Albums (Official Charts Company)	17
US Billboard 200	8

== Certifications ==
Region	Certification	Certified units/sales
New Zealand (RMNZ)	Gold	7,500^{^}
^{^} Shipments figures based on certification alone.
