= The Charmkins =

1983 American TV special

- Image from the Charmkins commercial for Hasbro, made by Ed Seeman and Ray Favata, Gryphon Productions
- Written by: George Arthur Bloom
- Starring: Ben Vereen; Aileen Quinn; Sally Struthers
- Country of origin: United States
- Original language: English

Production
- Executive producers: Joe Bacal; David H. DePatie; Tom Griffin
- Producer: Bob Richardson
- Running time: 30 minutes
- Production companies: Hasbro; Sunbow Productions; Marvel Productions; Toei Animation

Original release
- Network: First-run syndication
- Release: October 25, 1983

The Charmkins is an American television special based on an early 1980s toyline by Hasbro, which was broadcast on October 25, 1983.

== Plot ==
Brown-Eyed Susan and the other Charmkin children of Charmworld go on a quest to rescue Lady Slipper after she is kidnapped by Evil Dragonweed and whisked off to Thistledown to dance for him and his goons.

== Cast ==
The voice cast included:

- Ben Vereen as Dragonweed
- Aileen Quinn as Brown-Eyed Susan
- Sally Struthers as Poison Ivy
- Ivy Austin as Skunkweed
- Martin Biersban as Willie Winkle
- Bob Kaliban as Bramble Brother #2
- Lyn Lambert as Lady Slipper
- Christopher Murney as Briarpatch, Crocus, Bramble Brother #1
- Peter Waldren as Popcorn
- Fredricka Weber as Blossom
- Gary Yudman as Thorny
- Patience Jarvis as Announcer
- Tina Capland as Announcer

== Home media ==
Family Home Entertainment released the special on VHS and Betamax in 1985 and 1987.
