= You and Me Against the World (song) =

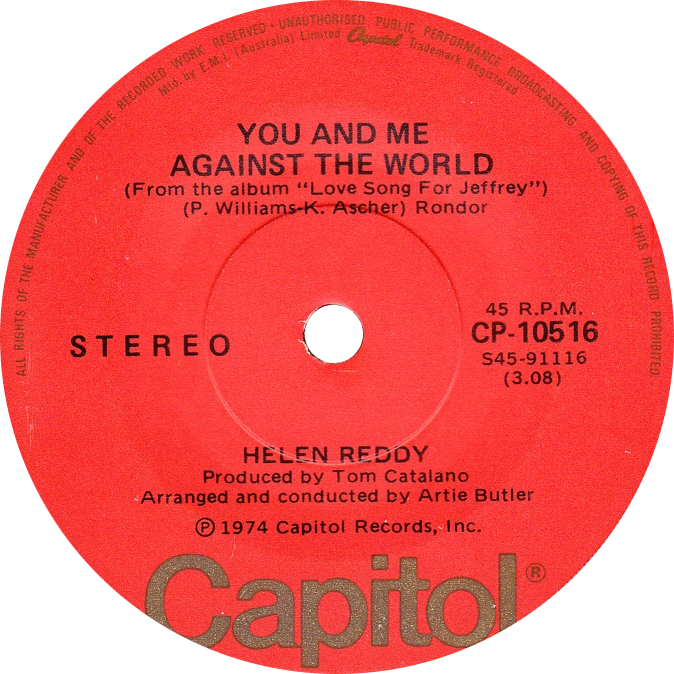
- Side A of the Australian single

Single by Helen Reddy

from the album Love Song for Jeffrey
- B-side: "Love Song for Jeffrey"
- Released: May 1974
- Genre: Pop
- Length: 3:08
- Label: Capitol
- Songwriters: Kenny Ascher, Paul Williams
- Producer: Tom Catalano

Helen Reddy singles chronology
"Keep on Singing" (1974)	"You and Me Against the World" (1974)	"Angie Baby" (1974)

"You and Me Against the World" is a song written by Kenny Ascher and Paul Williams, recorded by Helen Reddy for her 1974 album Love Song for Jeffrey.

"You and Me Against the World" was the first written by Williams teaming up with Ascher, a member of his band. It began as a gag song. Williams and Ascher had a discussion about their favorite songwriters which led to the spontaneous composition on the subject whose tune, Ascher then realized, had real hit potential. The song is sentimental in its lyrics, discussing "all the times we cried" and "when one of us is gone and one is left to carry on."

Williams himself debuted "You and Me Against the World" on his 1974 album Here Comes Inspiration, singing it as a traditional love ballad. Helen Reddy considered the lyrics too "paternalistic" to be convincing as a woman's declaration of love for a man. Instead, she interpreted it as a mother singing to a child, which her version clarified by her young daughter Traci's speaking to "Mommy" at the start and end. Williams’s version includes additional lyrics pertaining to circus: “Life can be circus/They underpay and overwork us/Though we seldom get our due/And when each day is through/I bring my tired body home/And look around for you...” Williams sang these lyrics when he performed it on The Odd Couple.

Released as the second single from Love Song for Jeffrey, "You and Me Against the World" reached number 9 on the Billboard Hot 100 in September 1974 and became the fourth of Reddy's six consecutive Adult Contemporary number ones. The song did equally well in Canada.

== Charts ==
=== Weekly charts ===
Chart (1974)	Peak position
Australia (Kent Music Report)	55
Canada (RPM) Top Singles	9
Canada (RPM) Adult Contemporary	1
U.S. Billboard Hot 100	9
U.S. Billboard Easy Listening	1
U.S. Cash Box Top 100	10

=== Year-end charts ===
Chart (1974)	Rank
Canada RPM Top Singles	113
U.S. Billboard Hot 100	57

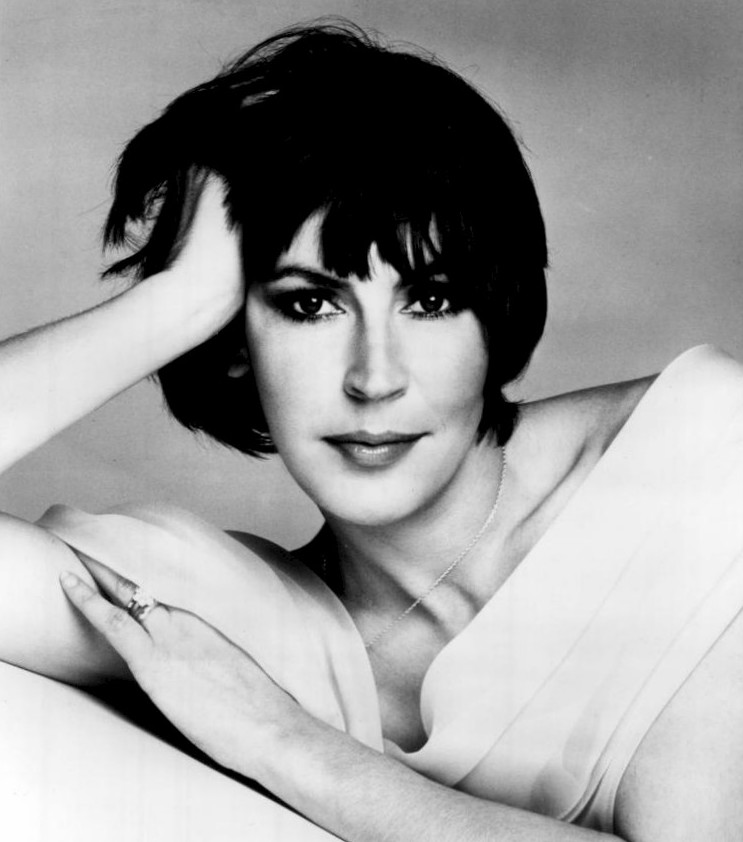
Helen Reddy, 1975

== Cover versions ==
"You and Me Against the World" had also been recorded by Ann Burton, Robert Goulet, Gladys Knight & the Pips, Vera Lynn, Johnny Mathis, Matt Monro, Matt Monro Jr, and Paul Williams. A Swedish rendering, "Du Och Jag Emot En Värld", was recorded by Lill-Babs.

Robert Downey Jr. played a cover of "You and Me Against the World" in the TV adaptation of The Sympathizer.

== See also ==
- List of number-one adult contemporary singles of 1974 (U.S.)
