= Rural Still Life =

Studio album by Tom Scott
- Released: 1968
- Recorded: 1968
- Genre: Jazz fusion
- Length: 36:41
- Label: Impulse!
- Producer: Tom Scott

Tom Scott chronology
The Honeysuckle Breeze (1967)	Rural Still Life (1968)	Hair to Jazz (1970)

Rural Still Life is the second album by American jazz saxophonist Tom Scott featuring performances recorded in 1968 for the Impulse! label.

== Reception ==
Down Beat, the most revered Jazz music magazine, gave the album four out of five stars in their March 1969 issue. Reviewer Alan Heineman found the album exciting and that "when it works, it really works." The Allmusic review by Jim Todd awarded the album 1½ stars stating "This 1968 LP from the early days of jazz fusion lacks the seamless merging of styles that would mark the commercial success of Tom Scott's later career. Instead, the 19-year-old reed player and the members of his quartet careen all over the style map – with varying degrees of success... At the time of this recording, Scott was already a fixture of the Los Angeles studio scene. As he makes clear on Rural Still Life, jazz was – and would remain – a side interest only".

Professional ratings
Review scores
Source	Rating
Allmusic	1.5/5 stars
The Rolling Stone Jazz Record Guide	1/5 stars

== Track listing ==
All compositions by Tom Scott except as indicated

1. "Rural Still Life #26" (Mike Lang) - 3:27
2. "Song #1" - 6:34
3. "Freak In" - 7:08
4. "With Respect to John Coltrane" - 8:03
5. "Just Messin' Around" (Mike Barone) - 5:21
6. "Body and Soul" (Edward Heyman, Robert Sour, Frank Eyton, Johnny Green) - 6:08

- Recorded in Los Angeles, California in 1968

== Personnel ==
- Tom Scott - tenor saxophone, soprano saxophone, multivider
- Michael Lang - piano, harpsichord
- Chuck Domanico - bass
- John Guerin - drums
