= The Frog Prince (1986 film) =

- British VHS cover
- Directed by: Jackson Hunsicker
- Screenplay by: Jackson Hunsicker
- Based on: The Frog Prince by The Brothers Grimm
- Produced by: Yoram Globus; Menahem Golan
- Starring: Aileen Quinn; Clive Revill; John Paragon; Helen Hunt
- Cinematography: Amnon Salomon
- Edited by: Jim Clark
- Distributed by: Cannon Group
- Release dates: October 5, 1986 (United Kingdom); June 1, 1988 (United States)
- Running time: 86 minutes
- Countries: United States; Israel
- Language: English
- Budget: $1.5 million

The Frog Prince, a.k.a. Cannon Movie Tales: The Frog Prince is a 1986 musical film, based on the Brothers Grimm's classic fairytale. It was filmed in Tel Aviv, Israel. The tagline was "Cannon Movie Tales: Lavish, Feature length new versions of the world's best loved storybook classics."

The film was released on October 5, 1986, in the United Kingdom, with a BBFC Rating of U for Universal and June 1, 1988, in the United States, with an MPAA Rating of G for general audiences of all ages.

== Plot ==
The film begins with the protagonist, Princess Zora of the Kingdom of Tartonia, rolling over and waking up in her bed. She runs through the castle, and the Emissary and chef scold her for not acting 'like a princess'. Zora is confronted by her elder sister, Henrietta, and her friend Dulcey in the hallway, where Henrietta lies to Zora, telling her that they are allowed to interrupt the King that day.

Meanwhile, the King, surrounded by his advisors, reads the letter which declares that Baron Von Whobble will decide whom is the true princess at the Sunset Dance. The King is upset because he made a promise to care for both of his nieces (Henrietta and Zora) when his sister died. Princess Zora interrupts, and the King gets upset at her for it. After Zora leaves her uncle, she goes to ask Henrietta why she lied earlier. Henrietta ignores her question as she and Dulcey look through a book of eligible bachelors. They turn the page to see the handsome Prince of Freedly, who has been missing for a year after a witch supposedly cursed him.

After being laughed at during dinner, Zora goes outside and wishes for someone to talk to. After dropping her golden ball in the fountain, a large, fully dressed frog named Ribbit emerges from the water. Zora promises to be Ribbit's friend and take him home to the palace, in exchange for him retrieving her lucky ball from the fountain. The two sneak into Zora's chambers, where she learns from the King that only one sister will be the princess. Ribbit helps Zora become princess-like, then leaves because he needs to get back to the water, but promises to meet her by the fountain the next day. Zora gives him her lucky ball as a gift before he leaves.

When Henrietta spies Ribbit teaching Zora how to be a princess, she gets angry, afraid that she will lose her spot as princess. She convinces Dulcey to help her kidnap Ribbit. They trap him and leave him without water, but Dulcey marks a map of where he is hidden. The next morning, Zora goes to the fountain to meet Ribbit, but he's not there. Henrietta tells Zora that she took Ribbit to the Woods of the Dark Heart, where he will die without water. Dulcey slips the map to Zora and tells her to hurry if she wants to save him.

When searching the woods, Zora gets lost, and only finds Ribbit when her lucky golden ball shines bright from the trap. She pours water on Ribbit, and he slowly wakes up. Zora lifts him from the hole using a rope, then gives him a kiss on the cheek, which turns Ribbit back into the Prince of Freedly. He says there's no time to explain because they must return to the palace so that Zora can be crowned the true princess. The lucky ball makes a horse appear, which the two ride back to the palace.

When the Prince of Freedly and Zora make it to the castle, they find the gate locked until the Prince wishes on the lucky ball that they can enter. And thus, the guard is awoken and opens the gate. Once they make it through, Zora's magic ball gives her a beautiful, clean dress. Before Henrietta can be crowned as princess, the Prince of Freedly bursts into the crowning ceremony and announces his identity, before saying that only a true princess could break the frog curse. Since Zora did that, she must be the true princess. Henrietta is outraged and leaves the ballroom.

Baron Von Whobble crowns Zora the true princess, and the King escorts her to dance with the Prince of Freedly. The two dance together in front of the whole ballroom, and Zora asks: "Are you really the Prince of Freedly?" In response, he says: "Yes, but do you know what my friends call me?" As the film ends, she says: "Yes I do. Ribbit."

== Cast ==
- Aileen Quinn - Princess Zora
- John Paragon - Ribbit / Prince Of Freedly
- Helen Hunt - Princess Henrietta
- Clive Revill - King William
- Seagull Cohen - Dulcey
- Eli Gorenstein - Cook
- Shmuel Atzmon - Baron Von Whobble
- Jeff Gerner - Emissary
- Aaron Kaplan - Page
- Moshe Ish-Kassit - Sleeping Guard

== Box office ==
Goldcrest Films invested £896,000 in the film and received £334,000 in return, causing them to lose £562,000.

== Critical reception ==
AMG gave the film a 2.5-star rating. The Frog Prince received a negative review from the parental advice website Common Sense Media, in which member Renee Schonfeld describes the film as "harmless, but charmless" and ranks it a 2 out of 5 for Quality because of production, acting, storyline, and other complaints.

== Soundtrack ==
- "Theme Song"

Written by Kenn Long

- "Lucky Day"

Written by Kenn Long
Performed by Aileen Quinn

- "A Promise Is A Promise"

Written by Kenn Long
Performed by Clive Revill & Aileen Quinn

- "Too Tall Frog"

Written by Kenn Long
Performed by Nick Curtis

- "Music Box Waltz"

Written by Kenn Long

- "Friendship"

Written by Kenn Long
Performed by Aileen Quinn & Nick Curtis

- "Have You Forgotten Me?"

Written by Kenn Long
Performed by Aileen Quinn
