= Austin Roberts (singer) =

American singer-songwriter (1945–2024)

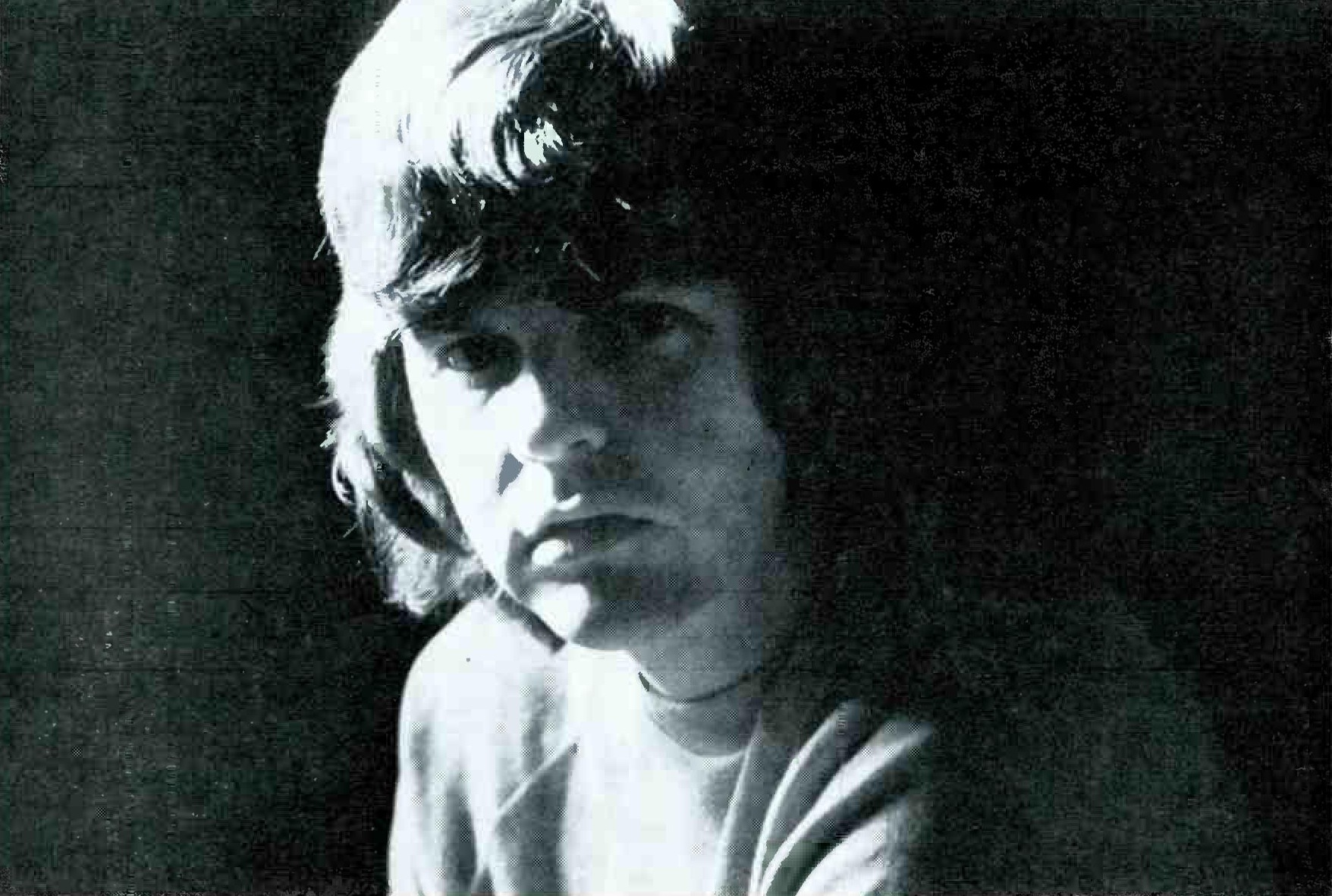
- Roberts in 1973

Background information
- Born: George Austin Robertson Jr. September 19, 1945; Norfolk, Virginia, U.S.
- Died: November 1, 2024 (aged 79)
- Genres: Pop, soft rock
- Occupations: Singer, songwriter
- Years active: 1968–2024
- Labels: Philips, ABC-Dunhill, Chelsea, Private Stock, Newpax, MCA-Songbird

Austin Roberts (born George Austin Robertson Jr.; September 19, 1945 – November 1, 2024) was an American singer and songwriter. His most successful recording was 1975's "Rocky"; a transatlantic top 40 hit single. He also wrote several songs that featured in episodes of Scooby-Doo Where Are You! and performed the theme for season 2 of the show.

== Life and career ==
Roberts was born in Norfolk, Virginia on September 19, 1945. He performed the theme song to the second season of the animated series, Scooby-Doo, Where Are You! as well as the season 2 "chase songs", many of which he also composed.

In 1972, he sang the hit "Something's Wrong with Me", written by Danny Janssen and Bobby Hart, which reached No. 12 on the Billboard Hot 100 in 1972. "Keep on Singing", later a No. 15 hit single for Helen Reddy in April 1974, was another hit for Roberts, reaching No. 50 on the Hot 100 in March 1973.

"Rocky" brought his greatest success, reaching No. 9 on the Hot 100 in October 1975. The track also reached No. 22 in the UK in November 1975, which to date is Roberts' only chart appearance in the UK. It also topped the pop charts in South Africa.

Roberts died on November 1, 2024, at the age of 79.

== Discography ==
=== Albums ===
- 1972: Austin Roberts (Chelsea) - U.S. No. 203, AUS No. 64
- 1973: The Last Thing On My Mind (Chelsea)
- 1975: Rocky (Private Stock) (digitally re-issued in 2016)
- 1976: Eight Days: A Personal Journey (Austin Roberts & Advent) (Newpax)
- 1981: Paint My Life (MCA Songbird)

=== Soundtrack ===
- Scooby-Doo's Snack Tracks: The Ultimate Collection

=== Singles ===
- 1968: "Ricky Ticky Ta Ta Ta" (Philips)
- 1968: "Mary and Me" (Philips)
- 1969: "Baltimore" (Philips)
- 1970: "Runaway" / "Just a Little" (Philips)
- 1970: "Pretty Mary Sunlight" (Philips)
- 1970: "One Night Ann" (Philips)
- 1970: "Sing Out the Love (In My Heart)" (lead vocalist for Arkade) (ABC Dunhill) - U.S. No. 99
- 1971: "Life Is for Living" (ABC Dunhill)
- 1971: "The Morning of Our Lives" (lead vocalist for Arkade) (ABC Dunhill) - U.S. No. 60, U.S. AC No. 16
- 1971: "Where You Lead" (lead vocalist for Arkade) (ABC Dunhill)
- 1972: "Like a Rosebud" (Horizon featuring Austin Roberts) (Virgo)
- 1972: "Every Day in My Life with Linda" (Horizon featuring Austin Roberts) (Virgo)
- 1972: "Something's Wrong with Me" (Chelsea) - U.S. No. 12, U.S. AC No. 16, AUS No. 40
- 1972: "Keep On Singing" (Chelsea) - U.S. No. 50, U.S. AC No. 22, AUS #46
- 1973: "The Last Thing on My Mind" (Chelsea) - U.S. No. 120,
- 1973: "One Word" (Chelsea) - U.S. CB No. 121,
- 1974: "Something to Believe In" (Chelsea)
- 1974: "I'd Rather Be with You" (Chelsea)
- 1975: "Rocky" (Private Stock) - U.S. No. 9, U.S. AC No. 22, UK No. 22, AUS No. 25
- 1975: "Children of the Rain" (Private Stock) - U.S. CB - No. 114,
- 1976: "Just to Make You Mine" (Private Stock)
- 1976: "This Time I'm in It for Love" (Private Stock)
- 1978: "Don't Stop Me Baby (I'm on Fire)" (Arista)
- 1980: "In the Garden" (MCA Songbird)
