= Naturally (Three Dog Night album) =

Studio album by Three Dog Night
- Released: November 18, 1970
- Recorded: January–October 1970
- Studio: American Recording Co., Studio City, California
- Genre: Soft rock
- Length: 35:04
- Label: Dunhill
- Producer: Richard Podolor

Three Dog Night chronology
It Ain't Easy (1970)	Naturally (1970)	Golden Bisquits (1971)

Singles from Naturally
- 1. "One Man Band" Released: November 1970; 2. "Joy to the World" Released: February 1971; 3. "Liar" Released: June 1971

Naturally is the fourth studio album by American rock band Three Dog Night, released in 1970. It produced two top ten hits: "Joy to the World" (#1 in February 1971) and "Liar" (#7). "One Man Band" reached the top 20 (#19). The only original by the band is the instrumental "Fire Eater".

Professional ratings
Review scores
Source	Rating
AllMusic	3/5 stars
Rolling Stone	(not rated)
Tom Hull	B

== Track listing ==
=== Side one ===
1. "I Can Hear You Calling" (Pentti Glan, Roy Kenner, Hugh Sullivan, Domenic Troiano) – 2:56
2. "One Man Band" (Billy Fox, January Tyme, Thomas Jefferson Kaye) – 2:51
3. "I'll Be Creeping" (Andy Fraser, Paul Rodgers) – 3:31
4. "Fire Eater" (Mike Allsup, Jimmy Greenspoon, Joe Schermie, Floyd Sneed) – 3:55
5. "Can't Get Enough of It" (Jimmy Miller, Steve Winwood) – 2:53

=== Side two ===
1. "Sunlight" (Jesse Colin Young) – 3:48
2. "Heavy Church" (Alan O'Day) – 3:38
3. "Liar" (Russ Ballard) – 3:53
4. "I've Got Enough Heartache" (Mike Kellie, Gary Wright) – 3:59
5. "Joy to the World" (Hoyt Axton) – 3:40

== Personnel ==
- Cory Wells – lead vocals (tracks A3, A5), background vocals
- Chuck Negron – lead vocals (tracks B1, B5), background vocals
- Danny Hutton – lead vocals (track B3), background vocals
- Mike Allsup – background vocals (track B5), guitar
- Joe Schermie – background vocals (track B5), bass guitar
- Floyd Sneed – background vocals (track B5), drums
- Jimmy Greenspoon – background vocals (track B5), keyboards

Production

- Producer: Richard Podolor
- Engineer: Bill Cooper
- Arranger: Three Dog Night
- Photography: Ed Caraeff
- Roadie, lighting: Dennis Albro
- Roadie, sound: Lee Carlton

== Charts ==
Album – Billboard (United States)

Year	Chart	Position
1971	Pop Albums	14

Singles – Billboard (United States)

Year	Single	Chart	Position
1971	"One Man Band"	Pop Singles	19
1971	"Joy to the World" (3:17 alternate mix)	Black Singles	46
1971	"Joy to the World" (3:17 alternate mix)	Pop Singles	1
1971	"Liar" (3:24 alternate mix)	Pop Singles	7

== Certifications ==
Region	Certification	Certified units/sales
United States (RIAA)	Gold	500,000^{^}
^{^} Shipments figures based on certification alone.
