= An Old Fashioned Love Song =

1971 single by Three Dog Night

Single by Three Dog Night

from the album Harmony
- B-side: "Jam"
- Released: November 1971
- Genre: Pop rock
- Length: 3:26
- Label: Dunhill
- Songwriter: Paul Williams
- Producer: Richard Podolor

Three Dog Night singles chronology
"Liar" (1971)	"An Old Fashioned Love Song" (1971)	"Never Been to Spain" (1971)

"An Old Fashioned Love Song" is a 1971 song written by Paul Williams and performed by the American rock band Three Dog Night. Chuck Negron performed the lead vocal on this track. Taken as the first single from their fifth studio album, Harmony (1971), the song peaked at number 4 on the Billboard Hot 100 chart in December 1971, becoming the band's seventh top-ten hit. It was Three Dog Night's first record to top the U.S. easy listening chart. It reached number 2 in Canada.

According to the Karen Carpenter biography Little Girl Blue by Randy L. Schmidt, Williams originally intended the song for the Carpenters, who were in the middle of a string of hits with their own brand of "old fashioned love songs", including two of Williams's own compositions, "We've Only Just Begun" and "Rainy Days and Mondays". Although this was the first song Williams had written specifically for the Carpenters, Richard Carpenter rejected it, and so Williams offered the song to Three Dog Night. The Carpenters never recorded the song, but did perform it live on television with Carol Burnett a few months later.

== Chart performance ==
=== Weekly charts ===
Chart (1971–72)	Peak position
Australia (KMR)	16
Canada Top Singles (RPM)	2
Canada RPM Adult Contemporary	3
New Zealand (Listener)	3
US Billboard Hot 100	4
U.S. Billboard Adult Contemporary	1

=== Year-end charts ===
Chart (1971)	Rank
Canada	28

Chart (1972)	Rank
Australia	171
U.S. (Joel Whitburn's Pop Annual)	41

== Certifications ==
Region	Certification	Certified units/sales
United States (RIAA)	Gold	1,000,000^{^}
^{^} Shipments figures based on certification alone.

== Paul Williams version ==
"An Old Fashioned Love Song"

Single by Paul Williams

from the album Just an Old Fashioned Love Song
- Released: 1971
- Genre: Pop
- Label: A&M
- Songwriter: Paul Williams

The song's composer Paul Williams recorded his own version of the song he had written, which was included on his 1971 album Just an Old Fashioned Love Song. Williams later performed the song when he appeared on The Muppet Show in 1976. He also sang a portion of the song for an episode of The Odd Couple in 1974.

== Other versions ==
- The Ray Conniff Singers and The Sandpipers recorded and released their respective versions later in 1971.
- The New Seekers covered the song on their 1971 album We'd Like to Teach the World to Sing
- Country music singer Jeris Ross released a cover version of the song in 1972. Her rendition of the song reached number 58 on the Billboard country singles chart.
- Andy Williams released a version in 1972 on his album, Love Theme from "The Godfather".
- The song was also sampled in the 1999 hip-hop song "Once Again (Here to Kick One for You)" by Handsome Boy Modeling School featuring Grand Puba and Sadat X.
- The intro to the song was also sampled by Chinese Man in their song "More", from the album "The Groove Sessions Volume 1" in 2007.

== See also ==
- List of Billboard Easy Listening number ones of 1972
