= A Little Bit of Love (album) =

Studio album by Paul Williams
- Released: 1974
- Genre: Pop
- Label: A&M
- Producer: Kenny Ascher

Paul Williams chronology
Here Comes Inspiration (1974)	A Little Bit of Love (1974)	Phantom of the Paradise (1974)

Professional ratings
Review scores
Source	Rating
AllMusic	2/5 stars

A Little Bit of Love is a studio album by Paul Williams, released in 1974. The album is Williams' sixth studio album and the fourth studio album under A&M Records. Notable songs from the album include "Sad Song (That Used to Be Our Song)", "A Little Bit of Love", "The Family of Man" and "Loneliness". "Nice to Be Around" was written with composer John Williams for the film Cinderella Liberty and was nominated for a Best Song Oscar, sung by Maureen McGovern for the soundtrack.

== Track listing ==
1. "A Little Bit of Love" (Ken Ascher, Paul Williams)
2. "Sleep Warm" (Gary Ulmer, Paul Williams)
3. "Margarita" (Tom Jans, Paul Williams)
4. "Sunday" (Ken Ascher, Paul Williams)
5. "The Family of Man" (Jack Conrad, Paul Williams)
6. "California Roses" (Paul Williams)
7. "She Sings for Free" (Ken Ascher, Paul Williams)
8. "Nice to Be Around" (John Williams, Paul Williams)
9. "Then I'll Be Home" (Paul Williams)
10. "Loneliness" (Ken Ascher, Paul Williams)
11. "Sad Song (That Used to Be Our Song)" (Ken Ascher, Paul Williams)

== Charts ==
Chart (1974)	Peak position
US Billboard 200	95
