= Aileen Quinn =

American actress, singer and dancer (born 1971)

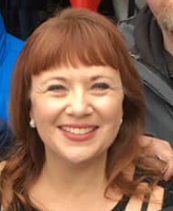
- Quinn in Woodridge, Illinois in 2019
- Born: Aileen Marie Quinn; June 28, 1971 (age 55); Yardley, Pennsylvania, U.S.
- Occupations: Actress, singer, dancer
- Years active: 1981–present
- Labels: Columbia (1981–1993); Interscope (1993–1997); Warner Bros. (1997–2006); Epic (2006–2010); Independent (2011–present)
- Website: Official website

Aileen Marie Quinn (born June 28, 1971) is an American actress, singer and dancer. She played the title character in the 1982 film Annie, which earned her two Golden Globe Award nominations.

== Early life ==
Quinn was born on June 28, 1971, and raised in Yardley, Pennsylvania. The oldest child of Helen Ann Quinn and Andrew Quinn Sr., she is the older sister of Andrew Quinn Jr. She began dance lessons when she was 4 at Knecht Dance Academy in Levittown, Pennsylvania, learning ballet and tap dance.

When she was young, Quinn was introduced to show business by her mother, who was a TV, radio, and stage singer/actress then elementary school teacher. Quinn begged to audition for a part in a local community theater production of Annie Get Your Gun and won a role. She performed in additional community productions.

Raised in Far Hills, New Jersey, she attended Grey Nun Academy during elementary school and attended Oak Knoll School of the Holy Child in Summit, New Jersey for high school.

Taking a break after her child acting career, at the age of 18, Quinn decided to focus on school. She graduated from Drew University in 1994. She was a language major with a minor in political science, and is a member of Sigma Delta Pi, a Spanish honor society.

== Career ==
After obtaining an agent, Quinn won a small role in the 1981 film Paternity and commercial work in New York City. She began appearing in television commercials including Planters Cheez Balls, Shake ‘n Bake and Northern bathroom tissue. At eight years old, she landed the role of the "swing orphan" (understudy to all of the orphans except Molly and Annie) in the Broadway production of Annie.

After eight auditions over the course of a year, and up against over 8,000 other competitors, Quinn received the title role in the 1982 movie Annie, directed by John Huston. Annie earned Quinn two Golden Globe nominations, a win for "Best Actress" from the Youth in Film Awards, and a Razzie for "Worst New Star". Aileen was 9 years old when she was cast as Annie.

Aileen Quinn was under contract for several years with Columbia Pictures to make other Annie sequels which never materialized. During this time, she continued performing in lead roles in regional theater in such shows as The Wizard of Oz (Dorothy), Bye, Bye Birdie (Kim), Annie (Annie), Shenandoah (Jenny), and A Day in Hollywood/A Night in the Ukraine (Harpo). She also lent her voice to two animated cartoon specials which aired on national television, The Charmkins and The Wizard of Oz. The Annie film soundtrack album went platinum, and subsequently Quinn released her own album, Bobby's Girl, in 1982. Soon after that release, she starred as Princess Zora in the classic fairy tale The Frog Prince, which was released on videocassette and aired on the Disney Channel several times.

After graduation from college, Quinn once again took to the stage. In 1994, she appeared as Bet in Oliver! at Paper Mill Playhouse. She toured the US for more than five years with three Broadway national tours: Fiddler on the Roof (Chava), Peter Pan (Tootles/Jane) and Saturday Night Fever (Annette). She studied Shakespeare in London, where she appeared in As You Like It and Twelfth Night at LAMDA. Off-Broadway productions include Dreamstuff (Princess), Creature (Elizabeth) and Yiddle With a Fiddle (Yiddle). Regional theater credits up to the present include The Unsinkable Molly Brown (Molly), That Was Then (World Premiere Play-April Gregory), and Funny, You Don't Look Like a Grandmother (her Daughter).

Quinn appeared in a few small roles in independent films between 2006 and 2010. She hosted Generation Gap, an interactive sitcom used to teach kids how to resolve conflicts. It was written and directed by filmmaker Edna Harris and aired on PBS in 2004. Quinn played a minor role in the 2009 film Multiple Sarcasms which stars Timothy Hutton and Mira Sorvino.

Quinn was an adjunct theater professor at Monmouth University in West Long Branch, New Jersey, the campus of which had been the site of the 1982 film version of Annie. She was awarded an honorary degree from Monmouth University in 2009. Quinn was also a Spanish, drama, and dance teacher at Hudson Catholic Regional High School in Jersey City, New Jersey.

She has her own band, Aileen Quinn and The Leapin' Lizards. Quinn met her bandmates after a neighbor heard her singing in her apartment, then introduced Quinn to the other musicians. They released their first album, Spin Me, in 2015. They released their second album, Lightning and Thunder, in November 2019.

== Personal life ==
Quinn is fluent in Spanish. She spent six months with a family in Chile as part of an exchange program and considers it one of her life's most rewarding experiences.

== Filmography ==
Year	Title	Role	Notes
1981	Paternity	Little Girl at Park	Uncredited
1982	Annie	Annie Bennett Warbucks	Young Artist Award for Best Young Motion Picture Actress; Nominated—Golden Globe Award for Best Actress – Motion Picture Comedy or Musical; Nominated—Golden Globe Award for New Star of the Year – Actress
1982	The Wizard of Oz	Dorothy Gale	Voice role
1982	Lights, Camera, Annie!	Herself	
1982	Andy Williams Early New England Christmas	Herself	TV special
1983	The Charmkins	Brown-Eyed Susan	Voice role, TV special
1986	The Frog Prince	Princess Zora	
1986	The Great Space Coaster	Herself	
2007	30	Maggie	
2010	Multiple Sarcasms	School secretary	
2014	The Comeback Kids	Dr. Quinn	2 episodes
2020	Will & Grace	Ramona Delaney	Episode: "Performance Anxiety"
2023	Carol Burnett: 90 Years of Laughter + Love	Herself	TV special

== Discography ==
=== Albums ===
- Bobby's Girl released November 17, 1982, Columbia Records
- Spin Me released 2015, Independent Label
- Lightning and Thunder released 2019, Independent Label

=== Soundtracks ===
- Annie - Original Motion Picture Soundtrack released May 1982, Columbia Records

=== Singles ===
- "Tomorrow" released 1982, Columbia Records
- "At Christmas Time" released December 20, 2016, Independent Label
- "Auld Lang Syne" released December 20, 2016, Independent Label
