= Out in the Country =

1970 single by Three Dog Night

Single by Three Dog Night

from the album It Ain't Easy
- B-side: "Good Time Living"
- Released: August 1970
- Recorded: 1969
- Genre: Rock
- Length: 3:08
- Label: Dunhill
- Songwriters: Paul Williams; Roger Nichols
- Producer: Richard Podolor

Three Dog Night singles chronology
"Mama Told Me (Not to Come)" (1970)	"Out in the Country" (1970)	"One Man Band" (1970)

"Out in the Country" is a song written by Paul Williams and Roger Nichols and performed by Three Dog Night. It was produced by Richard Podolor, and was featured on their 1970 album, It Ain't Easy. In the US, "Out in the Country" peaked at number 11 on the US adult contemporary chart, and number 15 on the Billboard Hot 100 the weeks of October 17 and 24, 1970. Outside the US, the record reached number 9 in Canada. Released in the first year of Earth Day, "Out in the Country" was an early environmental advocacy song. The lyrics are about finding solace outside the city, "before the breathing air is gone..."

Cash Box described the song as having "Attractive material and an exciting TDN delivery [that] give the team another top forty blockbuster."

== Chart performance ==
=== Weekly charts ===
Chart (1970)	Peak position
Australia (KMR)	85
Canada RPM Top Singles	9
US Billboard Hot 100	15
US Billboard Adult Contemporary	11
US Cash Box Top 100	9

=== Year-end charts ===
Chart (1970)	Rank
US (Joel Whitburn's Pop Annual)	126
US Cash Box Top 100	86

== Other versions ==
- Williams released a version on his 1972 album, Life Goes On.
- R.E.M. covered it as a b-side for their 2003 single Bad Day.
