= Mama Told Me Not to Come =

1967 song by Eric Burdon and the Animals

Song by Eric Burdon and the Animals

from the album Eric Is Here
- Released: March 1967
- Genre: Roots rock
- Length: 2:15
- Label: MGM
- Songwriter: Randy Newman
- Producer: Tom Wilson

"Mama Told Me Not to Come"

Song by Randy Newman

from the album 12 Songs
- Released: 1970
- Genre: Rock
- Length: 2:12
- Label: Reprise
- Songwriter: Randy Newman
- Producer: Lenny Waronker

"Mama Told Me Not to Come", also written as "Mama Told Me (Not to Come)", is a song by American singer-songwriter Randy Newman written for Eric Burdon's first solo album in 1966. Three Dog Night's 1970 cover topped the US Billboard Hot 100 for two weeks in July 1970. Tom Jones and Stereophonics' version also reached No. 4 on the UK Singles Chart in 2000.

== Lyrics and music ==
Newman says that the song was inspired by his own lighthearted reflection on the Los Angeles music scene of the late 1960s. Music professor James E. Pernone interpreted the song as being about an inexperienced man attending an orgy and suddenly being introduced to marijuana smoking, whiskey drinking, and loud music. In addition Newman biographer Kevin Courrier notes that the title, which also forms the lyrics of the chorus, contains a sexual double-entendre on the word "come". Perone suggested that references to "tea" and "cigarettes" in the song are veiled references to marijuana and that references in the song to sugar are veiled references to LSD.

Perone described the melody as being "minimalistic" and "speech-like". The verses are based on a dominant seventh chord and employ "clipped, repetitious melodic phrases." In contrast, the melody of the chorus is more catchy.

== Versions by the Animals and by Newman ==
The first recording of "Mama Told Me Not to Come" was cut by Eric Burdon & The Animals. A scheduled release of a single in September 1966 was withdrawn, but the song was eventually included on their 1967 album Eric Is Here.

Newman's own turn at his song was released on the 1970 album 12 Songs, and was characterized by Newman's mid-tempo piano accompaniment, as well as Ry Cooder's slide guitar part, both of which give the song the feel of a bluesy Ray Charles-style rhythm and blues number. According to Allmusic critic Matthew Greenwald, Newman's recording has a "slower, more sinister groove" than the more famous, later Three Dog Night version. Greenwald called the song "Randy Newman at his sarcastic best" for its black humor and its description of the rock 'n' roll scene of the time.

Courrier commented on Newman's vocal delivery. he states that unlike in the Three Dog Night version, Newman's delivery reflects a terror that the singer feels at the party and also conveys a sense of tension asto whether the singer is more terrified at the orgy itself or at the fact that he's enjoying it.

Newman released a live version of "Mama Told Me Not to Come" on his 1971 live album Randy Newman Live. "Mama Told Me Not to Come" has also been released on several of Newman's compilation albums, including Lonely at the Top: The Best of Randy Newman and Guilty: 30 Years of Randy Newman.

== Three Dog Night version ==
"Mama Told Me (Not to Come)"

Single by Three Dog Night

from the album It Ain't Easy
- B-side: "Rock & Roll Widow"
- Released: May 1970
- Recorded: 1969–1970
- Studio: American Recording Company
- Genre: Rock
- Length: 3:19 (album version); 2:58 (single version)
- Label: ABC; Dunhill
- Songwriter: Randy Newman
- Producer: Richard Podolor

Three Dog Night singles chronology
"Celebrate" (1970)	"Mama Told Me (Not to Come)" (1970)	"Out in the Country" (1970)

Also in 1970, Three Dog Night released a longer, rock 'n roll and funk-inspired version (titled "Mama Told Me (Not to Come)") on It Ain't Easy, featuring Cory Wells singing lead in an almost humorous vocal style, Jimmy Greenspoon playing a Wurlitzer electronic piano, Michael Allsup playing guitar, and Donna Summer on backing vocals, though uncredited.

Billboard ranked the record as the No. 11 song of 1970. The single was certified gold by the Recording Industry Association of America on July 14, 1970, the same day that It Ain't Easy was certified gold. It was also the number-one song on the premiere broadcast of American Top 40 with Casey Kasem on July 4, 1970.

Cash Box suggested that this song could "do for Randy Newman what the Fifth Dimension did for Laura Nyro" since Three Dog Night is "the first to apply muscle to his material."

Courrier felt that Three Dog Night missed the humor of the song and instead turned it into "a catchy curio." Wells had heard the song when he was with his previous group, the Enemies, and had included it in their set list. He wanted to record it with Three Dog Night but the rest of the group didn't think it was commercial enough so Wells didn't succeed until the group's third album. Chuck Negron had particular doubts about the Three Dog Night version, and didn't think Wells understood the song, but Wells felt vindicated when the single reached number one. Wells said:

"Mama Told Me (Not to Come)" was a tune that I had been doing before Three Dog Night, when I still had my old group in Arizona. I used to buy all these bizarre records – still do – and one of them was a Randy Newman album. On it was "Mama Told Me" and I became a tremendous fan, long before Randy Newman became "in". When I brought the song to the other guys, they didn't like it. They hated it. Matter of fact, it took me three albums for them to accept it. I kept saying "Please listen to this song. It's a hit song. Man, will you please listen to it?" And they said. "Cory, it just doesn't have it. Why don't you try some other song instead?" I pushed so hard for "Mama Told Me". Eventually, they contributed their ideas and things, and it turned out to be what it was.

== Charts ==
=== Weekly charts ===
Chart (1970)	Peak position
Australia (Kent Music Report)	10
Canada Top Singles (RPM)	2
Ireland (IRMA)	6
Netherlands (Single Top 100)	14
New Zealand (Listener)	13
South Africa (Springbok Radio)	10
UK Singles (Official Charts)	3
US Billboard Hot 100	1
West Germany (GfK)	12

=== Year-end charts ===
Chart (1970)	Rank
Australia (Kent Music Report)	67
Canada Top Singles (RPM)	40
US Billboard Hot 100	11

== Certifications ==
Region	Certification	Certified units/sales
United States (RIAA)	Gold	1,000,000^{^}
^{^} Shipments figures based on certification alone.

== Tom Jones and Stereophonics version ==
"Mama Told Me Not to Come"

Single by Tom Jones and Stereophonics

from the album Reload
- B-side: "Looking Out My Window"
- Released: March 6, 2000
- Studio: Hook End (Oxfordshire, England); Eden, RAK (London, England)
- Length: 3:00
- Label: Gut; V2
- Songwriter: Randy Newman
- Producers: Bird and Bush

Tom Jones singles chronology
"Baby, It's Cold Outside" (1999)	"Mama Told Me Not to Come" (2000)	"Sex Bomb" (2000)

Stereophonics singles chronology
"Hurry Up and Wait" (1999)	"Mama Told Me Not to Come" (2000)	"Mr. Writer" (2001)

Music video
- Tom Jones, Stereophonics - Mama Told Me Not To Come on YouTube

Tom Jones and Stereophonics covered the song for Jones' 34th album, Reload, in 1999. It was released as a single on March 6, 2000, and reached No. 4 on the UK Singles Chart, No. 7 in Iceland, No. 11 in Ireland and No. 45 in New Zealand. This version was produced by Steve Bush and Marshall Bird (also known as "Bird & Bush"). Stereophonics lead singer Kelly Jones (no relation to Tom) shared the lead vocals with Jones. The video featured an appearance by Welsh actor Rhys Ifans.

=== Track listings ===
UK CD1 and cassette single

1. "Mama Told Me Not to Come"
2. "Looking Out My Window" (with the James Taylor Quartet)
3. "Mama Told Me Not to Come" (the Rotton remix)

UK CD2

1. "Mama Told Me Not to Come"
2. "Mama Told Me Not to Come" (Mama Turtled Me Not to K mix)
3. "Mama Told Me Not to Come" (Future Loop Foundation remix)

European CD single

1. "Mama Told Me Not to Come" – 3:01
2. "Mama Told Me Not to Come" (Future Loop Foundation remix) – 6:15

European maxi-CD single

1. "Mama Told Me Not to Come" – 3:01
2. "Looking Out My Window" (with the James Taylor Quartet) – 3:20
3. "Mama Told Me Not to Come" (Mama Turtled Me Not to K mix) – 7:06
4. "Mama Told Me Not to Come" (Future Loop Foundation remix) – 6:15
5. "Mama Told Me Not to Come" (the Rotton remix) – 3:49

Australian CD single

1. "Mama Told Me Not to Come" (album mix)
2. "Mama Told Me Not to Come" (Mama Turtled Me Not to K mix)
3. "Mama Told Me Not to Come" (Future Loop Foundation remix)
4. "Looking Out My Window" (with the James Taylor Quartet)
5. "What a Game" (Tom Jones / NRL)
6. "What a Game" (video)

=== Credits and personnel ===
Credits are adapted from the Reload album booklet.

Studios

- Recorded at Hook End (Oxfordshire, England), Eden Studios, and RAK Studios (London, England)
- Mixed at The Townhouse (London, England)
- Mastered at The Soundmasters (London, England)

Personnel

- Randy Newman – writing
- Tom Jones – vocals
- Kelly Jones – vocals, guitar
- Victy Silva – backing vocals
- Richard Jones – bass guitar
- Tony Kirkham – keyboards
- Stuart Cable – drums
- Andy Duncan – programming, percussion
- Bird and Bush – production
- Stephen Hague – additional production
- Bob Kraushaar – engineering
- Jeremy Wheatley – mixing
- Kevin Metcalf – mastering

=== Charts ===
==== Weekly charts ====
Chart (2000)	Peak position
Europe (Eurochart Hot 100)	20
Germany (GfK)	73
Iceland (Íslenski Listinn Topp 40)	7
Ireland (IRMA)	11
Netherlands (Dutch Top 40 Tipparade)	17
Netherlands (Single Top 100)	77
New Zealand (Recorded Music NZ)	45
Scottish Singles Sales (Official Charts)	3
Switzerland (Schweizer Hitparade)	51
UK Singles (Official Charts)	4
UK Indie (Official Charts)	1

==== Year-end charts ====
Chart (2000)	Position
Iceland (Íslenski Listinn Topp 40)	92
UK Singles (OCC)	118

=== Certifications ===
Region	Certification	Certified units/sales
United Kingdom (BPI)	Silver	200,000^{‡}
^{‡} Sales+streaming figures based on certification alone.

== Other versions ==
P. J. Proby recorded one of the earliest takes on the song in 1967, followed by Three Dog Night's 1970 hit. Also in 1970, American singer-songwriter Odetta covered the song on her album "Odetta Sings". It has also been recorded by a diverse range of artists, including Wilson Pickett, Lou Rawls, The Wolfgang Press, Yo La Tengo, The Slackers, and Paul Frees (as W.C. Fields) accompanied by The Animals' Lazlo Bane. Jazz singer Roseanna Vitro included it in her 2011 collection The Music of Randy Newman. A 1970 cover by The Jackson 5 was released on Come and Get It: The Rare Pearls.

Tea Leaf Green and Widespread Panic have performed this song live. In 1971, the comic singer Patrick Topaloff released a French version named Maman, viens me chercher.

== Soundtrack appearances ==
Three Dog Night's version is used to great effect in the 1997 Paul Thomas Anderson film Boogie Nights, playing as Eddie Adams first arrives at Jack Horner's home after Eddie's fight with his mother.

It would also later appear in Terry Gilliam's 1998 movie adaptation of Hunter S. Thompson's 1972 gonzo novel Fear and Loathing in Las Vegas. Due to the song's upbeat, paranoid mood, it was used for the scene of obsessively drug-using protagonist Raoul Duke deciding to abandon his trashed and over-billed hotel room. It also appears as the last song in the movie's G-rated trailer, mainly accompanying Duke's wild car ride to have Dr. Gonzo catch a plane in time, a scene where in the R-rated trailer and in the actual film, Viva Las Vegas by Dead Kennedys was used instead.
