= Never Been to Spain =

1971 single by Three Dog Night

Single by Three Dog Night

from the album Harmony
- B-side: "Peace of Mind"
- Released: 1971
- Genre: Rock
- Length: 3:43
- Label: Dunhill 4299
- Songwriter: Hoyt Axton
- Producer: Richard Podolor

Three Dog Night singles chronology
"An Old Fashioned Love Song" (1971)	"Never Been to Spain" (1971)	"The Family of Man" (1972)

"Never Been to Spain" is a song written by Hoyt Axton, originally released on his 1971 LP Joy to the World and later that year performed by Three Dog Night, with Cory Wells on lead vocal. It was featured on their 1971 album Harmony. The recording was produced by Richard Podolor.

== Background ==
The lyrics consist of the narrator ruminating about overseas locales that he has never visited, but about which he feels he has some proxy experience, primarily via the music, but also due to other presumed highlights found in those places. He loosely compares his own actual travels to these more worldly spots.

In the final verse, he observes that while he has "never been to heaven", he has "been to Oklahoma", where he was told he was born, thus implying a kinship between the two places. Hoyt Axton, who was born in Oklahoma, explained that he originally wrote, "...in Oklahoma, born in a coma...." However, it was considered inappropriate; thus, the lyrics were changed to "not Arizona".

== Chart performance ==
In the US, "Never Been to Spain" peaked at number five on the Billboard chart in February 1972, and number 18 on the U.S. adult contemporary chart in 1972. Outside of the US, "Never Been to Spain" reached number three in RPM in Canada and number 34 in Australia.

== Charts ==
=== Weekly charts ===
Chart (1971–1972)	Peak position
Australia (Kent Music Report)	34
Canada RPM Top Singles	3
New Zealand (Listener)	12
US Billboard Hot 100	5
US Billboard Adult Contemporary	18
US Cash Box Top 100	5

=== Year-end charts ===
Chart (1972)	Rank
Canada	64
US Billboard Hot 100	73
US Cash Box Top 100	62

== Other notable versions ==
Ronnie Sessions released his version as a single in 1972 that reached number 36 on the Billboard Country chart.
