= Michael Allsup =

American guitarist (born 1947)

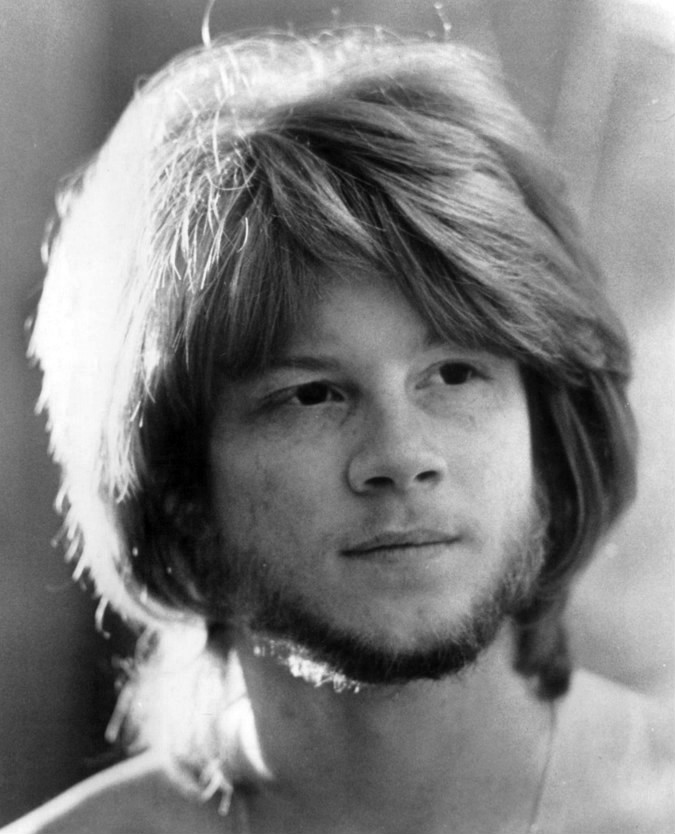
- Allsup in 1971

Background information
- Born: March 8, 1947 (age 79)
- Genre: Rock
- Occupation: Guitarist
- Instrument: Guitar
- Member of: Three Dog Night

Michael Rand Allsup (born March 8, 1947) is an American guitarist, best known as a member of the rock band Three Dog Night.

== Background ==
Allsup's parents were originally from Oklahoma, but relocated to the small town of Empire, California. Allsup became interested in a guitar in his teens and started his musical career by playing in a dance band with some friends from high school. He played in numerous local bands before relocating to Los Angeles in 1968, where he met a trio of vocalists (Danny Hutton, Chuck Negron, and Cory Wells), who had a recording contract with Dunhill Records and were looking for backing musicians. Allsup joined their new band, Three Dog Night, which became successful in the late 1960s through the mid-1970s. Allsup left the band in early-mid 1974 to form his own band, SS Fools, with former Three Dog Night members Joe Schermie and Floyd Sneed, along with Stan Seymore, Wayne DeVillier, Bobby Kimball, and Jon Smith, to little success. In 2015 he toured with Three Dog Night, with band co-founder Danny Hutton.
