= Roger Nichols (songwriter) =

American composer and songwriter (1940–2025)

- Born: Roger Stewart Nichols; September 17, 1940; Missoula, Montana, U.S.
- Died: May 17, 2025 (aged 84) Bend, Oregon, U.S.
- Occupations: Songwriter; composer; instrumentalist
- Instruments: Violin; guitar; bass; piano

Roger Stewart Nichols (September 17, 1940 – May 17, 2025) was an American composer and songwriter. He was a multi-instrumentalist who played violin, guitar, bass guitar and piano.

== Background ==
Roger Stewart Nichols was born in Missoula, Montana, on September 17, 1940, but grew up in Santa Monica, California, where his family had moved shortly after his birth. Both of his parents were musicians, and he inherited their interest in music from an early age, playing the violin as a child and later starting a band. After graduating from Santa Monica High School, he enrolled at the University of California, Los Angeles, where he played basketball under head coach John Wooden. However, he dropped out of college after two years to pursue music.

== Career ==
Nichols co-wrote many songs with lyricists Paul Williams, Tony Asher, and Bill Lane.

Asher and Nichols co-wrote several songs on Nichols' debut album Roger Nichols and the Small Circle of Friends (A&M Records, 1968) which was produced by Tommy LiPuma, engineered by Bruce Botnick, and featured session contributions from Van Dyke Parks, Randy Newman and Lenny Waronker. Although the album was not a big seller, A&M co-owner Herb Alpert recommended that Nichols be hired by A&M publishing as a staff songwriter, and it was during this period that he was introduced to Paul Williams.

Nichols' collaborations with Paul Williams include "We've Only Just Begun" (performed by The Carpenters), which was originally written for a Crocker Bank commercial. They were commissioned to write a jingle after a bank executive heard Nichols' album, and it was composed in a matter of hours on the last day before the deadline. The commercial (sung by Williams) was heard on TV by Richard Carpenter, who believed it had hit potential. According to the documentary Close to You: Remembering The Carpenters, Williams reported that his label-mate Richard called him up and asked if there was a complete song. Williams replied, "We had an additional verse and a bridge, but if we didn't I'd have lied through my teeth. This was a chance to get a Carpenters record which was a big deal in those days. Richard and Karen gave our songs a life."

Richard's group, The Carpenters, subsequently recorded a version which became a major hit in late 1970. It was nominated for a Grammy Award for Song of the Year, was included on BMI's million performances list and received an award for selling a million copies of sheet music. The song was also covered by Curtis Mayfield among many others.

"Times of Your Life", written with Lane and performed by Paul Anka, reached number one on the Adult Contemporary chart in January 1976.

Another Nichols-Williams song, "Out in the Country" by Three Dog Night (later covered by R.E.M.), reached the Top TWenty. Six months later, "Rainy Days and Mondays" was another gold record by The Carpenters and Nichols' third gold record in a single year.

Other hits were The Carpenters' "I Won't Last a Day Without You", Art Garfunkel's "Travelin' Boy" (covered by Rumer), and "I Never Had It So Good" (covered by Barbra Streisand). He also scored the theme song from Hart to Hart with a lyric by Lane.

Nichols released a Japan-only CD in 1995 called Roger Nichols and a Circle of Friends – Be Gentle With My Heart, featuring vocalist Sheila O'Connell-Roussell, on which he recorded some of his best-known tunes, including "We've Only Just Begun", "I Won't Last a Day Without You", and "Rainy Days and Mondays" (which featured Williams on guest vocals).

He also released an album in 2007 with the original Small Circle of Friends, Full Circle, which brought together the group to cover many of Nichols hits for other bands, including "Out in the Country" and "Let Me Be the One" as well as other tunes penned by Nichols. 2008 saw an upgraded release of Full Circle, issued by Steve Stanley's Now Sounds label. This version also contained five previously unreleased, 1960s-era demo recordings.

== Personal life and death ==
In addition to his extensive musical career, Nichols also was a successful jeweler.

Nichols lived in Bend, Oregon, with his wife, the former Therese Vorndran. He died from pneumonia at his home on May 17, 2025, at the age of 84. He was survived by his wife and three daughters.

== Discography ==
=== Studio albums ===
- Roger Nichols & The Small Circle of Friends (1968)
- Roger Nichols and A Circle of Friends – Be Gentle With My Heart (1995)
- Roger Nichols and The Small Circle of Friends – Full Circle (2007)
- Roger Nichols and The Small Circle of Friends – My Heart is Home (2012)

==== Special Editions ====
- Roger Nichols and The Small Circle of Friends – Full Circle (2008) – Now Sounds (UK) edition with five original demo extra tracks.

=== Compilations ===
- Treasury (2016)
- Treasury Extra Tracks (2018)
- Roger Nichols Works ~ Special 7inch Box (2018)
- The Roger Nichols Songbook -Various Artists (2025, Japan release only)

=== Singles ===
Title	Year	Peak	Writers and producers	Album
Title	Year	US Bub.	Writers and producers	Album
"Snow Queen" (A&M Records 830) (b.w. "Love Song, Love Song")	1966	29	L. Marks; Doug Tibbles; Gerry Goffin; Carole King	Roger Nichols and the Small Circle of Friends (1968)
"Let's Ride" (A&M Records 946) (b.w. "Just Beyond Your Smile")	1968	—	Paul Williams; Tommy LiPuma	Roger Nichols and the Small Circle of Friends (1968)

== Songbook ==
Song	Most Famously Covered By	Year	Composed By	Latest CD / Digital Release
Always You	The American Breed	1968	Roger Nichols (songwriter), Tony Asher	The Best Of The American Breed / Geffen Records / 2016
Just Beyond Your Smile	The Sunshine Company	1967	Roger Nichols (songwriter), Tony Asher	Happy Is / Oldays Records / 2018
Just What I've Been Lookin' For	The Vogues	1970	Roger Nichols (songwriter), Smokey Roberds	Sing The Good Old Songs And Other Hits / Reprise Records / 2013
Love So Fine	The Four King Cousins	1968	Roger Nichols (songwriter), Tony Asher	Introducing... / Capitol / 2021
No Love Today	Michelle Phillips	1976	Roger Nichols (songwriter)	Ultimate Anthology / Universal / 2016
Poto Flavus	John Tartaglia	1969	Roger Nichols (songwriter)	Ultimate Anthology / Universal / 2014
