= Paul Williams (songwriter) =

American songwriter (born 1940)

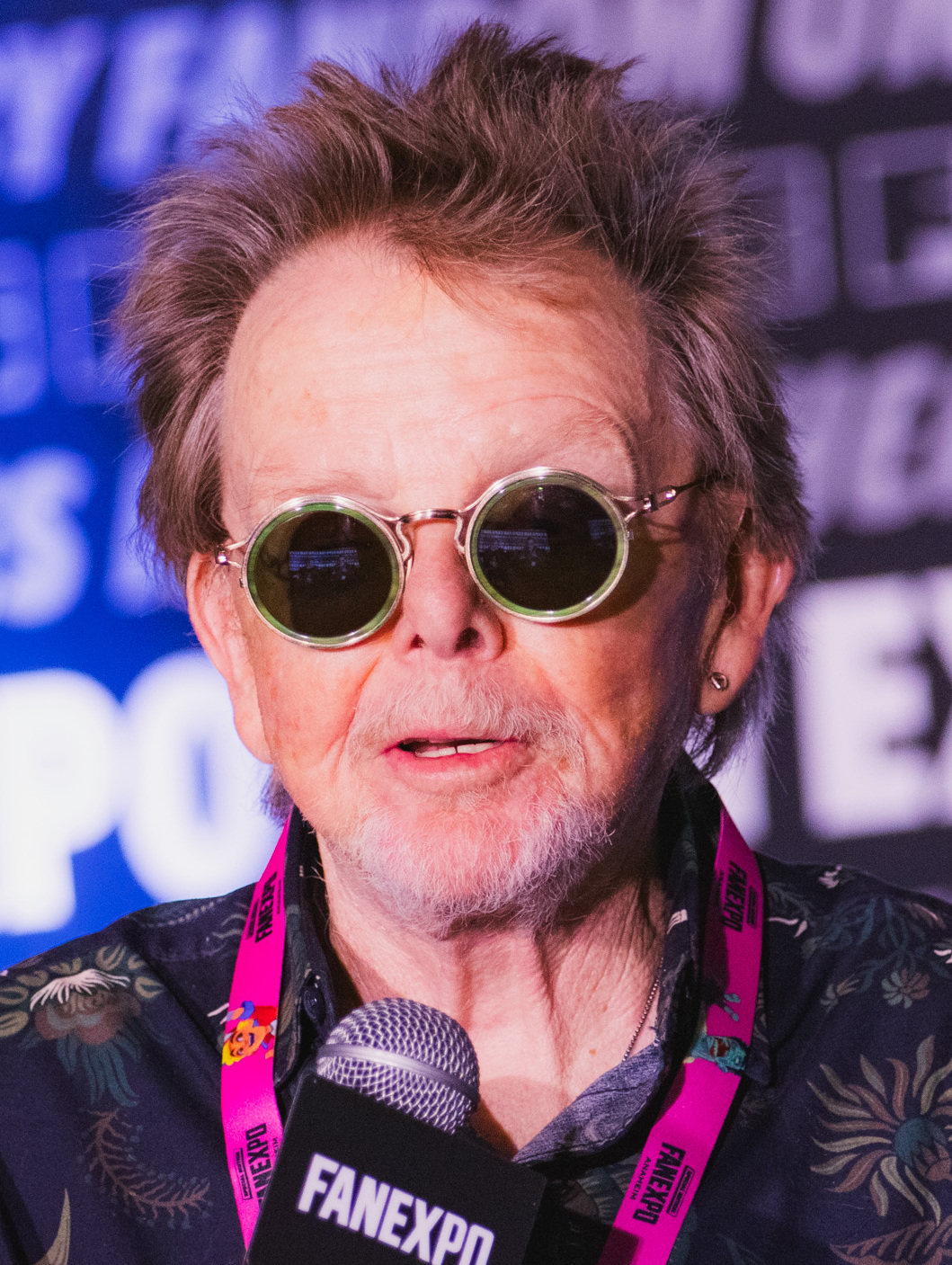
- Williams at Fan Expo Anaheim in June 2026

Background information
- Born: Paul Hamilton Williams Jr. September 19, 1940 (age 86); Omaha, Nebraska, U.S.
- Origin: Los Angeles, California, U.S.
- Genres: Folk; pop; soft rock; film score
- Occupations: Songwriter; actor; composer; singer
- Years active: 1964–present
- Labels: A&M; Reprise; Portrait
- Website: paulwilliamsofficial.com

Paul Hamilton Williams Jr. (born September 19, 1940) is an American songwriter and actor. He is known for writing and co-writing popular songs performed by a number of acts in the 1970s, including Three Dog Night's "An Old Fashioned Love Song" and "Out in the Country", Helen Reddy's "You and Me Against the World", Biff Rose's "Fill Your Heart", and the Carpenters' "We've Only Just Begun" and "Rainy Days and Mondays". He also wrote "Cried Like a Baby" for teen idol Bobby Sherman.

Williams is also known for writing the score and lyrics for Bugsy Malone (1976) and his musical contributions to other films, including the Oscar-nominated song "Rainbow Connection" from The Muppet Movie, and writing the lyrics to the No. 1 chart-topping song "Evergreen", the love theme from the Barbra Streisand film A Star Is Born, for which he won a Grammy for Song of the Year and an Academy Award for Best Original Song. He wrote the lyrics to the opening theme for the television show The Love Boat, with music previously composed by Charles Fox, which was originally sung by Jack Jones and, later, by Dionne Warwick.

Williams has had a variety of high-profile acting roles, such as Little Enos Burdette in the action-comedy Smokey and the Bandit (1977) and the villainous Swan in Brian De Palma's Phantom of the Paradise (1974), which Williams also co-scored, receiving an Oscar nomination in the process. He also voiced the Penguin in several projects in the DC Animated Universe. Since 2009, Williams has been the president and chairman of the American songwriting society ASCAP.

== Early life ==
Williams was born in Omaha, Nebraska, the son of Paul Hamilton Williams Sr., an architectural engineer, and his wife, Bertha Mae (née Burnside), a homemaker.

One of his brothers was John J. Williams, a NASA rocket scientist, who participated in the Mercury and Apollo programs and was awarded the NASA Distinguished Service Medal, their highest honor, in 1969. His other brother was Mentor Williams, also a songwriter, who wrote Dobie Gray's 1973 hit "Drift Away".

== Musical career ==
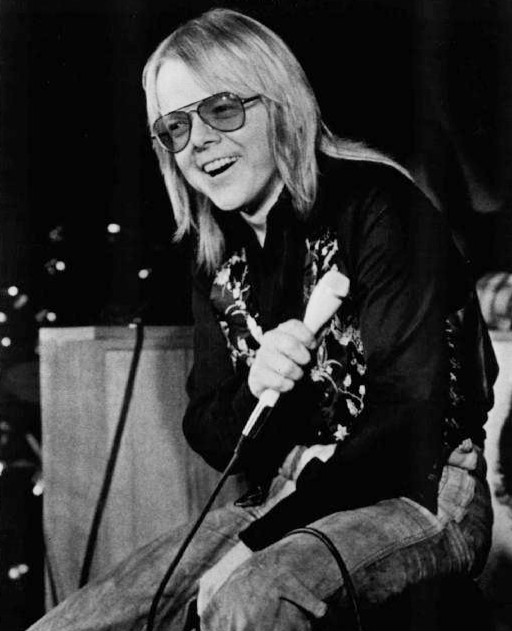
Williams performing in 1974

Williams began his professional songwriting career with Biff Rose in Los Angeles. The two men first met while working together on a television comedy show. Together, they wrote the song "Fill Your Heart", which was recorded by Rose on his first album, The Thorn in Mrs. Rose's Side (1968). Tiny Tim covered it as the B-side of his hit "Tiptoe Through the Tulips" (1968). In 1969 he formed a studio band called The Holy Mackerel, which produced and released an LP with songs like "Scorpio Red", which however failed to chart. David Bowie recorded a version of the song on his album Hunky Dory (1971). Rose and Williams wrote "I'll Walk Away" (recorded by Rose on his third, eponymous album). Rose was instrumental in getting Williams his break with A&M Records which resulted in Williams working with songwriter Roger Nichols. Williams and Nichols were responsible for a number of successful pop hits from the 1970s, including several hits for Three Dog Night ("An Old Fashioned Love Song", "The Family of Man", and "Out in the Country"), Helen Reddy ("You and Me Against the World"), and the Carpenters, most notably "Rainy Days and Mondays", "I Won't Last a Day Without You", and "We've Only Just Begun", originally a song for a Crocker National Bank television commercial featuring newlyweds, and which has since become a cover-band standard and de rigueur for weddings throughout North America.

An early collaboration with Roger Nichols, "Someday Man", was covered by the Monkees (a group for which he unsuccessfully auditioned).

A frequent co-writer of Williams' was musician Kenneth Ascher. Their songs together included "Rainbow Connection", sung by Jim Henson (as Kermit the Frog) in The Muppet Movie (1979).

Williams composed the song, "When the River Meets the Sea" sung by John Denver in the movie, John Denver & the Muppets: A Christmas Together (1979).

Williams worked on the music for a number of films, including writing and singing on Phantom of the Paradise (1974) in which he starred and earned an Oscar nomination for the music, and Bugsy Malone (1976). Williams wrote and sang the song "Where Do I Go from Here", which was used in the end credits of the film Thunderbolt and Lightfoot. He contributed lyrics to the Cinderella Liberty song "You're So Nice to Be Around" with music by John Williams, and it earned them an Oscar nomination. Along with Ascher and Rupert Holmes, he wrote the music and lyrics to A Star Is Born (also 1976), with Barbra Streisand and Kris Kristofferson. The love ballad, "Evergreen", (lyrics by Paul Williams, melody by Barbra Streisand) won the Academy Award for Best Original Song and a Grammy for Song of the Year. He has been nominated on other occasions for an Academy Award and several Golden Globe Awards.

In 1987 he wrote the songs performed by Dustin Hoffman and Warren Beatty in the film Ishtar.

He wrote the music for a musical production of Happy Days that debuted in 2007. Williams wrote and sang "What Would They Say", the theme song from the made-for-television film The Boy in the Plastic Bubble (1976).

Williams wrote music and lyrics of "Silence Is Our Song" for Richard Barone's 2010 album Glow, and collaborated with Scissor Sisters on their second album, Ta-Dah.

In March 2012, it was announced that Williams had "written a couple of tunes" on Random Access Memories, the album of French electronic duo Daft Punk. He co-wrote and sang vocals on "Touch" and co-wrote "Beyond". Williams and Nile Rodgers were the only featured artists to speak on behalf of Daft Punk at the 2014 Grammy Awards upon their receipt of the Album of the Year award for Random Access Memories. Williams told an anecdote about his work with Daft Punk: "Back when I was drinking, I would imagine things that weren't there and I'd get frightened. Then I got sober and two robots called and asked me to make an album." He communicated a "message from the robots" to the audience: "As elegant and as classy as the Grammy has ever been is the moment when we saw those wonderful marriages and 'Same Love' is fantastic. It is the height of fairness and love and the power of love for all people at any time in any combination is what [Daft Punk] wanted me to say. Captain Kirk uses the Enterprise. [Daft Punk] sail on a ship called Generosity. They are generous in spirit ... This is a labor of love and we are all so grateful."

Williams is a member of the Songwriters Hall of Fame, and his songs have been performed by both pop and country music artists. In April 2009, Williams was elected president and chairman of the American Society of Composers, Authors and Publishers (ASCAP).

In September 2015, Williams, along with bass player Kasim Sulton, led a global virtual songwriting collaboration at Hookist.com. The mission was to write the first crowd-sourced anthem to be performed at FacingAddiction.org's concert and rally on The National Mall on October 4, 2015, headlined by Steven Tyler, Sheryl Crow, and Joe Walsh among others. The theme of the song was "Celebrate Recovery" and the goal was to reduce the stigma associated with addiction. Williams, Sulton and Dr. Mehmet Oz opened the show and led 10,000 people in a singalong of "Voice of Change" at the base of the Washington Monument. Sulton led a singalong of the song on The Dr. Oz Show which went viral.

From April 12 to 19, 2025, he performed the song, Rainbow Connection along with Portugal. The Man and Weird Al Yankovic in Yo Gabba Gabba Coachella.

== Film and television career ==
Although predominantly known for his music, Williams has appeared in films and many television guest spots, such as the Faustian record producer Swan in Brian DePalma's film Phantom of the Paradise (1974)—a rock and roll adaptation of The Phantom of the Opera, Faust, and The Picture of Dorian Gray, for which Williams wrote the songs—and as Virgil, the genius orangutan in Battle for the Planet of the Apes (1973).

On February 9, 1973, Williams made an appearance on The Tonight Show Starring Johnny Carson in which he sang a song in full make-up as Virgil. This was due to filming on the set running late so he stayed in makeup for his scheduled appearance. He played Miguelito Loveless, Jr. in The Wild Wild West Revisited (1979), a reunion film featuring the original cast of the television series The Wild Wild West. He played himself, singing a song to Felix Unger's daughter Edna, on the television series The Odd Couple in 1974. He made his film debut as Gunther Fry in the satire The Loved One (1965).

After appearing on The Muppet Show in 1976, Williams worked closely with Jim Henson's Henson Productions on The Muppet Movie, working on the soundtrack and appearing in a cameo part as the piano player in the nightclub where Kermit meets Fozzie Bear. He was also the lyricist for Emmet Otter's Jug-Band Christmas.

Williams was hired by TV producers Paul Junger Witt and Tony Thomas to write title tracks for two of their ABC comedies, It Takes Two (1982–1983), on which he sang a duet with Crystal Gayle, and Condo (1983), in which Williams' theme was sung by Drake Frye. Williams composed and performed the theme to the McLean Stevenson sitcom The McLean Stevenson Show in 1976.

Williams composed, and sang "Flying Dreams" for the animated film The Secret of NIMH.

Williams has appeared in many minor roles. He provided the voice of the Penguin in Batman: The Animated Series and other series in the DC Animated Universe. He appeared on an episode of Walker, Texas Ranger as a radio DJ covering a modern-day Bonnie and Clyde. He appeared in 2008 in an episode of Nickelodeon's children's show Yo Gabba Gabba! entitled "Weather", where he performed "Rainbow Connection". Williams also appeared in the Dexter's Laboratory episode "Just An Old Fashioned Lab Song" as Professor Williams, Dexter's piano teacher.

He made numerous television appearances in the 1970s and 1980s, including on The Odd Couple, Hawaii Five-O, Match Game '79, Hollywood Squares, The Love Boat, Police Woman, Fantasy Island, The Hardy Boys, The Fall Guy, The Flip Wilson Special, Gimme a Break!, and The Gong Show. He has also guest-starred in the Babylon 5 episode "Acts of Sacrifice" (Season 2 Episode 12) as Taq, the aide to Correlilmurzon, an alien ambassador whose species finalizes treaties and agreements by having sex with the other signees.

In October 1980, Williams was host of the Mickey Mouse Club 25th Anniversary Special on NBC-TV. He stated that he tried out for the show in early 1955 and was turned down. He was a frequent guest and performer on The Tonight Show Starring Johnny Carson. He appears as the man making the phone call at the beginning of the music video for Hank Williams Jr.'s song "All My Rowdy Friends Are Coming Over Tonight". In 2014, he appeared on Community as an illegal textbook dealer who declines to purchase a batch of misprinted chemistry textbooks. Williams appeared in the 2017 film Baby Driver as the Butcher, an arms dealer.

He portrayed the character of Little Enos Burdette in Smokey and the Bandit (1977), Smokey and the Bandit II (1980), and Smokey and the Bandit Part 3 (1983). He had a recurring role as a former lawyer and information source in 2018's season 2 and 2019's season 3 of Goliath.

In 2024, He appeared in children's television in Yo Gabba Gabbaland in Season 1, and performed the song, Art Party in the episode 2 Make.

== Personal life ==
Williams has been married three times. He has two children, Sarah and Cole Williams (born 1981), from his first marriage (1971) to Kate Clinton. In 1993, he married Hilda Keenan Wynn, daughter of actor Keenan Wynn. His third wife is writer Mariana Williams.

An experienced skydiver, Williams completed over 100 jumps in the 1970s.

In September 2011, director Stephen Kessler's documentary Paul Williams Still Alive premiered at the Toronto International Film Festival.

Williams struggled with alcohol and substance abuse during the 1970s and 1980s. Sober since 1990, Williams was active in the field of recovery from addictions and became a Certified Drug Rehabilitation Counselor through UCLA. In 2014, he co-authored Gratitude and Trust: Recovery is Not Just for Addicts, with Tracey Jackson.

== Songbook ==
Song	Most famously recorded by	Year	Composed by	Latest CD / Digital Release
"An Old Fashioned Love Song"	Three Dog Night	1971	Williams	Harmony / Geffen Records / 2013
"Bitter Honey"	Jackie DeShannon	1968	Williams, Roger Nichols (songwriter)	Laurel Canyon / Capitol Records / 2005
"Do You Really Have a Heart"	Dobie Gray	1969	Williams	Drift Away: A Decade of Dobie 1969-1979 / Hip-O Select / 2004
"Evergreen (Love Theme from A Star Is Born)"	Barbra Streisand	1976	Williams, Barbra Streisand	A Star Is Born (1976 soundtrack) / Columbia / 2002
"Everything"	Barbra Streisand	1976	Williams, Rupert Holmes	A Star Is Born (1976 soundtrack) / Columbia / 2002
"Gone Forever"	Sergio Mendes & Brasil '77	1971	Williams	Pais Tropical / A&M Records / 2008
"Hellacious Acres"	Kris Kristofferson	1976	Williams, Kenny Ascher	A Star Is Born (1976 soundtrack) / Columbia / 2002
"I Fell"	The Four King Cousins	1968	Williams, Roger Nichols (songwriter)	Introducing... / Capitol / 2021
"I Know You"	Sergio Mendes & Brasil '77	1971	Williams, Roger Nichols (songwriter)	Pais Tropical / A&M Records / 2008
"I Never Had It So Good"	Kris Kristofferson and Rita Coolidge	1973	Williams, Roger Nichols (songwriter)	Full Moon / Real Gone Music / 2017
"It's Hard to Say Goodbye"	Claudine Longet	1968	Williams, Roger Nichols (songwriter)	Love Is Blue / A&M Records / 2014
"I Won't Last a Day Without You"	Carpenters	1972	Williams	A Song for You / A&M Records / 2016
"Let Me Be the One"	Anne Murray	1971	Williams, Roger Nichols (songwriter)	Talk It Over in the Morning / EMI / 1998
"Let's Ride"	The Montanas	1969	Williams, Roger Nichols (songwriter)	The Complete Studio Sessions / BGO / 2022
"Love Dance"	George Benson	1980	Williams, Ivan Lins	Give Me the Night / Warner Bros. / 2015
"Only Me"	First Edition	1968	Williams, Roger Nichols (songwriter)	The First Edition's 2nd / Universal Music / 2014
"Out in the Country"	Three Dog Night	1970	Williams, Roger Nichols (songwriter)	It Ain't Easy / Geffen Records / 2013
"Perfect Love"	Gladys Knight & the Pips	1973	Williams	Imagination / Sony / 2013
"Rainbow Connection"	Jim Henson as Kermit the Frog	1979	Williams, Kenny Ascher	The Muppet Movie / Walt Disney Records / 2013
"Rainy Days and Mondays"	Carpenters	1971	Williams, Roger Nichols (songwriter)	Carpenters / A&M Records / 2016
"She's Too Good for Me"	The Five Americans	1969	Williams, Roger Nichols (songwriter)	The Best of the Five Americans / Sundazed Music / 2003
"So Many People"	Chase	1972	Williams, Roger Nichols (songwriter)	Ennea / Epic / 2012
"Somebody Waiting"	Eydie Gormé	1971	Williams, Roger Nichols (songwriter)	It Was a Good Time / GL Music / 2005
"Someday Man"	The Monkees	1969	Williams, Roger Nichols (songwriter)	Instand Replay / Rhino / 2011
"Talk It Over in the Morning"	Anne Murray	1971	Williams, Roger Nichols (songwriter)	Talk It Over in the Morning / EMI / 1998
"The Drifter"	Heidi Brühl	1969	Williams, Roger Nichols (songwriter)	Heidi Brühl International / Universal / 2022
"The Family of Man"	Three Dog Night	1971	Williams, Jack Conrad	Harmony / Geffen Records / 2013
"The Woman in the Moon"	Barbra Streisand	1976	Williams, Kenny Ascher	A Star Is Born (1976 soundtrack) / Columbia / 2002
"To Put Up with You"	The Sandpipers	1968	Williams, Roger Nichols (songwriter)	Softly / A&M Records / 2012
"Trust"	Peppermint Trolley Company	1968	Williams, Roger Nichols (songwriter)	Beautiful Sun / Now Sounds / 2009
"Watch Closely Now"	Barbra Streisand, Kris Kristofferson	1976	Williams, Kenny Ascher	A Star Is Born (1976 soundtrack) / Columbia / 2002
"We've Only Just Begun"	Carpenters	1970	Williams, Roger Nichols (songwriter)	Close to You / A&M Records / 2016
"When Love Is Near"	The Original Caste	1969	Williams, Roger Nichols (songwriter)	Tartaglian Theorem / Capitol Records / 2012
"You and Me Against the World"	Helen Reddy	1974	Williams, Kenny Ascher	Love Song for Jeffrey / Capitol Records / 2004

=== Other hits ===
- "Love Dance" (Williams provided the lyrics. Written with Ivan Lins and Victor Martins, it was recorded by Ivan Lins, Barbra Streisand, and Sarah Vaughan, among others. It is considered a jazz standard.)
- "Flying Dreams" (from The Secret of NIMH soundtrack)
- "Touch" (Daft Punk – 2013 – Random Access Memories – Williams also provided lead vocals)
- "You're Gone" (US Country number 4 hit for Diamond Rio)
- "Waking Up Alone" was written and recorded by Williams in 1971. It peaked on the pop chart at number 60 in April 1972, spending nine weeks on the chart.

== Scores ==
=== Films ===
- Phantom of the Paradise (1974)
- Bugsy Malone (1976)
- Emmet Otter's Jug-Band Christmas (1977)
- The End (1978)
- The Muppet Movie (1979)

The Chase 1966

=== Theatre ===
- Bugsy Malone (1997)
- Happy Days (2007)
- Emmet Otter's Jug-Band Christmas (2008)

== Notable songs written for film soundtracks ==
- "Where Do I Go From Here" (composed and performed by Williams for Thunderbolt and Lightfoot) (1974)
- "Evergreen (Love Song from A Star Is Born)" (lyrics written by Williams, Academy and Golden Globe winner for Best Original Song) (1976)
- "What Would They Say?" (for The Boy in the Plastic Bubble starring John Travolta and Diana Hyland) (1976)
- "Rainbow Connection" (co-composed by Williams for The Muppet Movie, 2020 National Recording Registry inductee) (1979)
- "Flying Dreams" (co-composed with Jerry Goldsmith and performed by Williams for The Secret of N.I.M.H) (1982)
- "When Love is Gone" (co-composed by Williams for The Muppet Christmas Carol) (1992)
- "If We Could Remember" (co-composed with Jerry Goldsmith for The Sum of All Fears) (2002)
- "Still Alive" (composed and performed by Williams for Paul Williams Still Alive) (2011)
- "Old Souls", "The Hell of It" and "The Phantom's Theme (Beauty and the Beast)" composed for The Phantom of the Paradise (1974)
- "I Love You Too Much" and "The Apology Song" (co-composed with Gustavo Santaolalla for The Book of Life) (2014)
- "Time and Tide" (composed by Paul Williams and performed by Dale Menten for Lifeguard) (1976)

== Discography ==
=== Albums ===
Year	Title	Label	Peak positions	
Year	Title	Label	US BB	AUS KMR
196?	Words and Music by Paul Williams	Big Seven Music Corp.	—	—
1970	Someday Man	Reprise	—	—
1971	Just an Old Fashioned Love Song	A&M	41	22
1972	Life Goes On	A&M	159	—
1974	Here Comes Inspiration	A&M	165	—
1974	A Little Bit of Love	A&M	95	—
1975	Ordinary Fool	A&M	146	—
1979	A Little on the Windy Side	Portrait	—	90
1981	...And Crazy for Loving You	PalD	—	—
1997	Back to Love Again	Pioneer	—	—
2005	I'm Going Back There Someday	AIX	—	—

=== Soundtracks ===
Year	Title	Label	AUS Charts	Notes
1974	Phantom of the Paradise	A&M	94	-
1976	Bugsy Malone	Polydor	—	-
1976	A Star Is Born	Columbia	—	Motion Picture Soundtrack; with Kenny Ascher
1977	One on One: Original Motion Picture Soundtrack	Warner Bros.	—	Lyrics by Williams, music by Charles Fox; performed by Seals and Crofts
1979	The Muppet Movie: Original Soundtrack Recording	Atlantic	—	By Williams and Kenny Ascher
1982	The Secret of NIMH: Original Motion Picture Soundtrack	MCA	—	Williams performs the song "Flying Dreams"
1987	Ishtar		—	Lyrics by Williams
1992	The Muppet Christmas Carol	Walt Disney Records	—	-

=== Compilations ===
Year	Title	Label	Chart	Notes
1974	The Best of Paul Williams	A&M	—	
1977	Classics	A&M	155	
1988	Paul Williams	Pickwick	—	
2004	Evergreens: The Best of the A&M Years	Hip-O Select	—	

=== Other releases ===
- The Holy Mackerel (with The Holy Mackerel, 1969
- Wings (Michel Colombier 1971) co-wrote and featured on "Doesn't Anybody Know?"
- We've Only Just Begun (Roger Nichols and Paul Williams, 2001)
- Random Access Memories (Daft Punk, 2013) : Williams co-wrote and featured on "Touch", and co-wrote "Beyond"
- Chris Black Changed My Life (Portugal. The Man, 2023) : Williams features on one track

== Filmography ==
=== Film ===
Year	Title	Role	Notes
1965	The Loved One	Gunther Fry	credited as Paul H. Williams
1966	The Chase	Seymour	
1970	Watermelon Man	Employment Office Clerk	credited as Paul H. Williams
1973	Battle for the Planet of the Apes	Virgil	
1974	Phantom of the Paradise	Swan	
1977	Smokey and the Bandit	Enos "Little Enos" Burdette	
1977	Race for Your Life, Charlie Brown	Songs (uncredited)	
1978	The Cheap Detective	Boy	
1979	The Muppet Movie	El Sleezo Pianist	
1979	Stone Cold Dead	Julius Kurtz	
1980	Smokey and the Bandit II	Enos "Little Enos" Burdette	
1982	The Secret of NIMH	The Balladeer	Voice, uncredited
1983	Smokey and the Bandit Part 3	Enos "Little Enos" Burdette	
1984	The Night They Saved Christmas	Ed	
1989	Old Gringo	Cinematographer	
1990	Solar Crisis	Freddy the Bomb (voice)	
1991	The Doors	Warhol PR	
1994	Police Rescue	Paul Skelton	
1994	A Million to Juan	Jenkins	
1995	Headless Body in Topless Bar	Carl Levin	
2002	The Rules of Attraction	Duty Doctor	
2004	The Princess Diaries 2: Royal Engagement	Lord Harmony	
2007	Georgia Rule	Mr. Wells	
2010	Valentine's Day	Romeo Midnight (voice)	
2011	Paul Williams Still Alive	Himself	
2012	The Ghastly Love of Johnny X	Cousin Quilty	
2017	Baby Driver	"The Butcher"	
2020	Superman: Red Son	Brainiac (voice)	Direct-to-video

=== Television ===
Year	Title	Role	Notes
1970–1982	The Tonight Show Starring Johnny Carson	Himself; Virgil	
1973–1975	The Midnight Special	Host	
1974	The Odd Couple	Himself	
1974	Baretta	Sandy	
1975	When Things Were Rotten	Guy de Maupassant	
1976	Good Heavens	Henry Clyde	
1976	The McLean Stevenson Show	Himself	
1976	The Muppet Show	Himself	Episode 108; Also voiced two Muppet likenesses of himself
1977	The Hardy Boys/Nancy Drew Mysteries	Allison Troy	
1977	Police Woman	Willy Jaques	
1977	The Brady Bunch Hour	Himself	
1977	The Donny & Marie Show	Himself	
1977	The Captain and Tennille Show	Himself	
1978–1982	The Love Boat	Various	
1979	Hawaii Five-O	Tim Powers / Stringer	
1979	The Mary Tyler Moore Hour	Himself	
1979	The Wild Wild West Revisited	Dr. Miguelito Loveless, Jr.	Television film
1979–1980	Match Game	Himself	
1980–1982	Fantasy Island	Various	
1981	B. J. and the Bear	Dante Defoe	
1981–1982	The Fall Guy	Various	
1982	Rooster	Rooster Steele	Television film
1984	The Night They Saved Christmas	Ed	Television film
1985	Silver Spoons	Al Butler	
1985	My Little Pony: Escape from Catrina	Rep (voice)	Television special
1987	Frog	Gus	Television film
1987	Gimme a Break!	Captain Jerk	
1989	227	Stan	Episode: "Play It Again, Stan"
1988	The Munsters Today	Skinner	
1990	The Trials of Rosie O'Neill	Sven Ingerson	
1991	She-Wolf of London	Harvey the Troll	
1991	The Last Halloween	Gleep	TV short
1991	Timeless Tales from Hallmark	Frogbrauten	Episode: "The Steadfast Tin Soldier"
1992–1994	Batman: The Animated Series	Oswald Cobblepot / Penguin (voice)	7 episodes
1992–1993	The Pirates of Dark Water	Garen (voice)	13 episodes
1993	The Legend of Prince Valiant	Grafton Commander, Brother John (voice)	2 episodes
1993	The Town Santa Forgot	Pomp the Elf (voice)	Christmas television special
1994	Hart to Hart: Old Friends Never Die	Duke	
1994	Picket Fences	Benjamin Weedon	
1994–1995	Phantom 2040	Mr. Cairo (voice)	13 episodes
1995	Babylon 5	Taq	Episode: "Acts of Sacrifice"
1995	Walker, Texas Ranger	Tumbleweed Tom	
1995	Aaahh!!! Real Monsters	Izzith (voice)	Episode: "Where Have All the Monsters Gone?"
1995	The Tick	Mother of Invention (voice)	Episode: "Leonardo da Vinci and His Fightin' Genius Time Commandos!"
1995	Captain Planet and the Planeteers	Kujo (voice)	Episode: "Five Ring Panda-Monium"
1996	Boston Common	Father Rooney	
1997	Perversions of Science	Dr. Mueller	
1997	Honey, I Shrunk the Kids: The TV Show	Mahoney the Giant	
1998	The Bold and the Beautiful	Bailey Masterson	
1998	The New Batman Adventures	Oswald Cobblepot / Penguin (voice)	4 episodes
1998	Dexter's Laboratory	Professor Williams (voice)	Episode: "Just an Old Fashioned Lab Song"
1998	Superman: The Animated Series	Oswald Cobblepot / Penguin (voice)	Episode: "Knight Time"
2000	Star Trek: Voyager	Koru	
2008	A Muppets Christmas: Letters to Santa	The Head Elf	
2008	Yo Gabba Gabba!	Performer	
2011	Late Night with Jimmy Fallon	Himself	
2012	The View	Himself	
2013–2017	Fast N' Loud	Himself	
2014	Community	Britta's Contact	Episode: "VCR Maintenance and Educational Publishing"
2015	Adventure Time	Hierophant (voice)	3 episodes
2016–2018	Future-Worm!	Future Danny (voice)	2 episodes
2018–2019	Goliath	James "JT" Reginald III	
2019	Twelve Forever	Captain Elmer (voice)	Episode: "Stranger Forever"

== Legacy ==
"Rainbow Connection" was inducted into the National Recording Registry in 2020.
