= The Human Comedy (musical) =

- Original Cast Recording
- Music: Galt MacDermot
- Lyrics: William Dumaresq
- Book: William Dumaresq
- Basis: William Saroyan's; The Human Comedy
- Productions: 1983 Off-Broadway; 1984 Broadway; 1997 York Theatre

The Human Comedy is a 1983 musical with a book and lyrics by William Dumaresq and music by Galt MacDermot.

William Saroyan's tale originated as a screenplay he had been hired to write and direct for MGM. When the studio objected to its length and an uncompromising Saroyan was pulled from the project, he rewrote the story as a 1943 novel with the same title that was published shortly prior to the film's release.

== Production ==
The Off-Broadway production, directed by Wilford Leach, opened on December 28, 1983 at Joseph Papp's Public Theater, where it ran for 79 performances.

The cast included Stephen Geoffreys as Homer, Bonnie Koloc as Kate, Don Kehr as Marcus, Mary Elizabeth Mastrantonio as Bess, Josh Blake as Ulysses, Rex Smith as Spangler, Gordon Connell as Grogan, Leata Galloway as Diana, Joseph Kolinski as Tobey, Caroline Peyton as Mary, and Laurie Franks as Miss Hicks.

Like Hair and A Chorus Line before it, The Human Comedy garnered reviews favorable enough to prompt Papp to transfer it a larger, uptown Broadway house. After twenty previews, with the Off-Broadway cast and creative team, it opened on April 5, 1984 at the Royale Theatre, where it ran for 13 performances.

Frank Rich's critique of the original production had been positive, but The New York Times policy prohibited re-reviewing shows unless they were changed substantially, so his earlier comments were overshadowed by those damaging ones made more recently by Clive Barnes, among others. The general consensus was that The Human Comedy, with its intimate story staged in a semi-oratorio style with no scenery save for rear projections used to define each scene's locale, was not suited for a large venue with a conventional proscenium stage. Following Dude and Via Galactica, it was MacDermot's third critical and commercial failure, and proved to be his last attempt at a Broadway musical.

An original cast album was recorded but not released until 1997, when an 86-track, 2-CD set was issued by Original Cast Records.

In 1997, the show had a partially staged reading at the York Theatre in New York City as part of the York's Musicals In Mufti series. The show was directed by Roger Danforth and featured Heather MacRae as Kate, Richard Roland as Spangler, Diane Sutherland (Fratantoni) as Diana, Alan H. Green as Tobey, Jennifer Rosin as Bess, James Ludwig as Marcus, Joe Hynes as Homer, Traci Lyn Thomas as Mary, Aisha DeHaas as Beautiful Music, Benjamin Stix as Ulysses and Ron Carroll as Grogan.

Also in 1997, it was given a full production in Chicago by Splinter Group, directed by Matt O'Brien with musical direction by Jim Collins. Reviews were generally quite positive, with Chicago Tribune critic Richard Christiansen saying "'The Human Comedy' soars."

== Overview ==
The coming-of-age tale focuses on young Homer Macauley, a telegram messenger who is exposed to the sorrows and joys experienced by his family and the residents of his small California town during World War II. Homer's mother Kate is struggling to support her children following the death of her husband, his older brother Marcus is in the Army, his teenaged sister Bess daydreams about romance, and his younger brother Ulysses divides his attention between the passing trains and an unrequited desire to know why his father had to die. Other characters include Spangler and Grogan, who run the telegraph office, Spangler's girlfriend Diana, Marcus's orphaned army buddy Tobey and Marcus's sweetheart Mary.

Through-composed, The Human Comedy is far more an American folk opera like Porgy and Bess than it is a traditional book musical. Its score includes elements of 1940s swing, gospel, pop, folk music, and typical show tunes. John Beaufort noted that "The adapters have provided a generous mix of musical idioms and rhythms: Love songs, jazzy upbeat numbers, a gospel hymn, and a variety of other compositions in the MacDermot manner. The moods range from jubilation to quiet reverie."

The CurtainUp reviewer of a 2006 regional production wrote: "MacDermot and Dumaresq's sung-through vignettes are, like 'Porgy and Bess', best defined as an American folk opera...The absence of dialogue and the opera tag -- as well as an oratorio style staging (the absence of a musical's usual colorful scenery and choreography) no doubt helped to relegate 'The Human Comedy' to the status of "worthy flop." "

== Song list ==
Act I

- In a Little Town in California
- Hi Ya, Kid
- We're a Little Family
- The Assyrians
- Noses
- You're a Little Young for the Job
- I Can Carry a Tune
- Happy Birthday
- Happy Anniversary
- I Think the Kid Will Do
- Beautiful Music
- Cocoanut Cream Pie
- When I Am Lost
- I Said, Oh No
- Daddy Will Not Come Walking Through The Door
- The Birds in the Sky
- Remember Always to Give
- Long Past Sunset
- Don't Tell Me
- The Fourth Telegram
- Give Me All the Money
- Everything Is Changed
- The World Is Full of Loneliness
- Hi Ya, Kid (Reprise)

Act II

- How I Love Your Thingamajig
- Everlasting
- An Orphan I Am
- I'll Tell You About My Family
- I Wish I Were a Man
- Marcus, My Friend
- My Sister Bess
- I've Known a Lot of Guys
- Diana
- Dear Brother
- The Birds In The Trees/A Lot of Men
- Parting
- Mr. Grogan, Wake Up
- Hello, Doc
- What Am I Supposed to Do?
- Long Past Sunset (Reprise)
- I'm Home
- Somewhere, Someone
- I'll Always Love You
- Hi Ya, Kid (Reprise)
- Fathers And Mothers (And You And Me)

== Awards and nominations ==
- Tony Award for Best Featured Actor in a Musical (Geoffreys, nominee)
- Theatre World Award (Geoffreys and Koloc, winners)
- Drama Desk Award for Outstanding Featured Actress in a Musical (Koloc, nominee)
- Drama Desk Award for Outstanding Music (nominee)

== Sources ==
Not Since Carrie: Forty Years of Broadway Musical Flops by Ken Mandelbaum, published by St. Martin's Press (1991), pages 339-41 (ISBN 0-312-06428-4)
