= Alswang =

Alswang is a surname. Notable people with the surname include:

- Hope Alswang (1947–2024), American museum director
- Ralph Alswang (1916–1979), American designer
