= Reid Whitelaw =

- Born: Reid Smith Whitelaw; 17 October 1945
- Died: 23 June 2020 (aged 74)
- Occupations: Songwriter, record producer, music industry executive

Reid Whitelaw (17 October 1945 – 23 June 2020) was an American songwriter and music producer. He was mainly active in the 1960s and 1970s, composing, arranging and producing multiple hits.

== Background ==
Reid Whitelaw was born on 17 October 1945.

Whitelaw was once a deejay in Trenton New Jersey. He was also an executive assistant to Murray the K's production firm, and later headed his own production company, Reid Whitelaw Productions. He also founded the Brookside Records label. He was also a partner in Whitelaw and Carl Productions, a company he formed with Billy Carl.

== Career ==
=== 1960s ===
Reid Whitelaw and Billy Carl wrote "(We'll Meet in The) Yellow Forest" which was recorded by Jay & The Americans. It was a hit, peaking at No. 93 on the Cash Box Top 100 for the week of 19 August 1967. It also got to No. 81 on the Record World 100 Top Pops chart for the week of 26 August.

It was reported in the 9 November 1968 issue of Record World that Super K Productions, the composition / production entity had taken on Reid Whitelaw and Billy Carl. They debuted with the song, "Goody, Goody Gumdrops" which became a hit for the 1910 Fruitgum Company. They had also just completed an album for the group which also called Goody Goody Gumdrops.

Whitelaw and Carl wrote the songs "Wham! Bam! Ala Cazam" and "Lucy Brown". They also produced and arranged the recordings which were released on single, Date 2–1643. It was credited to The Tricks.

Feeling the need to move away from bubblegum music, Reid Whitelaw and Billy Carl went in another direction. They produced the record "Mind Reader" for the vocal and instrumental group, Eefrom Zeefrom Mixture. This was an assignment for Avco Embassy, which was announced by Hugo and Luigi in the 1 November 1969 issue of Record World. The record had a good review in the 19 November issue of Record World where it was a Four-Star Pick.

By Late November 1969, the project that Whitelaw and Billy Carl were working on, Year One by The Golden Gate had been released. It had a positive review in the 22 November issue of Record World where the potential to lure in teens was noted. It charted, making its debut in the Record World LP's Coming Up chart for the week of 27 December 1969, and peaked at No. 29 for the week of 17 January 1970.

=== 1970s ===
"Diane", a single from the Golden Gate Year One album was released in 1970. It got to No. 105 on the Billboard Bubbling Under the Hot 100 chart, No. 4 in the Cash Box Looking Ahead chart, and No. 97 on the Record World 100 Top Pops chart.

According to the 9 June 1973 issue of Record World, Roulette Records president Joe Kolsky announced that producers Whitelaw and Norman Bergen had entered into a long-term agreement with the label. The first single release under the agreement was "Baby You Belong to Me" by The Magic Touch. The record was one of the Hits of the Week and reviewed in the 9 June 1973 issue of Record World. It was positive with the production work of Bergen and Whitelaw being referred to as referred to as tasteful. A comparison was made to the group, the Stylistics, and Top 40 / R&B potential was also noted. In its second charting week on the Record World R&B Singles chart, it was at No. 72. It also got to No. 82 on the Billboard Hot Soul Singles chart.

Working with Don Oriolo and Mark Barkan, Whitelaw composed the song "Hot on the Heels of Love". It was recorded by Winchester, a five-piece rock group. The session was produced by Oriolo, Whitelaw and Bergen. It made the Record World 101 - 150 Singles chart, staying active for five weeks, peaking at No. 107 for the week of 3 February. It later attracted interest on the Northern Soul scene, and is included on the Golden Age of Northern Soul compilation.

Whitelaw and Norman Bergen wrote "Helplessly" which was recorded by The Moment of Truth which was released on the Roulette label. It was a national hit, making it to No. 74 on the Billboard Hot Soul Singles chart and No. 3 on the Dance chart in 1975.

Whitelaw and Norman Bergen produced "When You're Young and in Love" for Ralph Carter which he recorded in 1975. It was a hit, making it to No. 37 on the R&B chart.

Whitelaw and Bergen wrote "Extra, Extra (Read All About It)" for Ralph Carter. It was a hit for him in 1976, making it to No. 12 on the US Dance chart and No. 59 on the US R&B chart. It also peaked at No. 59 in the UK.

Working with Norman Bergen, he wrote "Nightime Fantasy" which was recorded by Vicki Sue Robinson. It was a hit in 1979, making it to No. 102 on the main chart and No. 21 on the Dance chart. Also that year, another Bergen Whitelaw composition "Love Is Just a Heartbeat Away" was a hit for Gloria Gaynor, which peaked at No. 81 on the Dance chart.

== Death ==
Reid Whitelaw died on 23 June 2020.
