= Don Oriolo =

American artist, musician, and writer (born 1946)

- Born: Don Oriolo; 1946 (age 79–80); New Jersey, U.S.
- Genres: Rock; R&B; pop; hip hop; new jack swing
- Occupations: Animator; A&R representative; record producer; author; painter
- Years active: 1960–present
- Labels: Zazoo Records; Warner Music Group

Don Oriolo (born 1946) is an American artist, musician, and writer best known for his work in the music publishing industry and for overseeing the Felix the Cat cartoon character after his father, co-creator Joe Oriolo, died in 1985. Don Oriolo also owns and operates the Oriolo Guitar Company, a guitar, bass, and ukulele manufacture company whose products often feature Felix and other Oriolo-designed artwork. Oriolo has also authored a number of books featuring his paintings of Felix the Cat, whom he describes as his creative muse. Some of his music publishing credentials include writing Jon Bon Jovi's first charted track, as well as signing Meat Loaf and Lisa Lisa and the Cult Jam.

== Early life ==
Don Oriolo was born and raised in New Jersey. He is the son of the co-creator of cartoons Felix the Cat and Casper the Ghost, Joe Oriolo. He credits his parents with fostering his creative personality as a child. Growing up as one of three children, Oriolo and his siblings drew pictures and played various musical instruments. Don's main instruments were the guitar and the piano. In one interview, he remembers being six years old and sitting underneath his mother's ironing board while she ironed and listened to Frank Sinatra. He credits this memory of Sinatra's music as his first mind, body, and soul connection to music, even recalling every little detail of the memory, right down to the smell of the fresh laundry, the steam from the iron, and the rhythm of the spray bottle. In a 2015 interview with wsRadio, he recalls his first gig as a musician at a local VFW Hall in New Jersey at the age of 13. He says that he always thought of his time playing guitar during his mother's sewing circle meetings at the age of nine as the true first live performances of his musical career. Oriolo was also a huge fan of Elvis Presley at this time, another artist he credits for his lifelong love of music.

In addition to playing music as a child, Oriolo was also an avid artist, and had a strong connection with the cartoon characters his father co-created. His infatuation with Felix the Cat started at a young age; it did not escape his father's notice. Joe Oriolo encouraged Don's artistic and musical talents throughout his childhood and into his adult life, and eventually introduced the younger Oriolo to Winston Sharples, Joe's colleague in the animation world. Sharples, who Don refers to as "Win," became Don's mentor in the entertainment and music arrangement businesses.

When Joe Oriolo died in 1985, the Felix franchise was left to Don, who took the iconic cartoon and successfully shepherded it into the turn of the century with numerous licensing and merchandising business ventures in various international markets. Under Oriolo's watch, Felix was the number one licensed character in Japan in the late '80s and early '90s.

== Music publishing ==
Oriolo began his career in the music industry as a songwriter, session/studio musician, and music arranger, before stepping into what he calls the "executive turntable" of music publishing. When he was first starting out as an aspiring musician, Oriolo would skip classes at high school and ride a bus from New Jersey into New York City, with his guitar. On these trips into New York, he would go to record and publishing companies to try to get meetings with any executives who would give him five minutes of their time. Eventually he started to turn heads and began to sell songs and work as a studio musician and music arranger. During his time as a studio musician, arranger, and composer, he worked with bands and musicians including The Chimes, The Tokens, The Paragons, The Cupids, Doctor Hook, Gloria Gaynor and many more.

Having already been in the recording business as a studio musician and writer, he was able to float his interest in professional management to some of the most successful record and publishing executives of the time, eventually landing a job with RSO Records, owned by Robert Stigwood Robert.

Oriolo continued to have a successful career in the music publishing business, discovering and signing musicians such as Meat Loaf, Jim Steinman, and Lisa Lisa. He also wrote music and arranged and produced records for musicians including Lisa Lisa & the Cult Jam, Doctor Hook, Meco, Robert Gordon and more. Oriolo is credited with writing Jon Bon Jovi's first charted single, which was a Star Wars-themed track titled "R2 D2, We Wish You a Merry Christmas."

Oriolo was a head publishing executive at RSO Records, Twentieth Century Fox, April Blackwood Music - East Coast, CBS/Sony Records, Elvis Presley's Gladys Music and Hill and Range Music, and he worked as the vice president of Chappell/Intersong Music. While at the companies, Oriolo published the works of the Bee Gees, Eric Clapton, Donna Summer, Casablanca Records, as well as Gamble and Huff's "Mighty Three" catalog. Other accomplishments as a music publishing executive include his contributions to the Broadway musical The Wiz, being named Country Music Publisher of the Year for both 1978 and 1979, and publishing the hit songs "Funky Town" and "Deja Vu."

Oriolo also owned and operated his own music publishing companies, for which he received numerous ASCAP and BMI awards, as well as many gold and platinum records. His publishing company also owns the hit songs "Supernatural Thing," "This Time I'll Be Sweeter," (both composed by songwriters Haras Fyre and Gwen Guthrie† February 3, 1999) and "Touch Me All Night Long". In 1984, Oriolo started his own record label, Personal Records, which amassed 28 charted records in just three years. He continues to work in the music industry working with musical heavy hitters like Gloria Gaynor, as well as fostering the careers of budding musicians such as Bronx-based pop artist Qeuyl, and Nyah Jewel, also of The Bronx. He still releases albums of his own music, with the most recent being two solo albums titled When You Gotta Go, You Go, and Earthlings Unite, as well as an album from his band Felix and The Cats titled The Cat is Back.

== Production and compositions ==
Along with Mark Barkan and Reid S. Whitelaw, Oriolo composed the song "Hot on the Heels of Love". The song was recorded by Winchester, a five-piece rock group. The session was produced by himself, Whitelaw and Norman Bergen. It was a minor hit, and was at No. 140 in the Record World 101 - 150 Singles chart for the week of 6 January 1973. It peaked at No. 107 for the week of 3 February. The song later attracted interest on the Northern Soul scene and is included on the Golden Age of Northern Soul compilation.

Oriolo and Barkan wrote "I'm Gonna Prove It". It was recorded by The Softones under the production of Hugo & Luigi. It was a hit, peaking at No. 44 on the R&B chart in 1973.

Working with Mark Barkan and Reid Whitelaw, Don Oriolo co-wrote "Baby You Belong to Me" which was recorded by The Magic Touch. Backed with "Lost and Lonely Boy", it was released on Roulette R-7143 in 1973. The production was handled by Whitelaw, Norman Bergen and Oriolo. It had a positive review in the 9 June 1973 issue of Record World where a comparison was made to the Stylistics and Top 40 potential noted. The record peaked in the US at No. 82.

== Felix the Cat ==
Oriolo is widely known as "The Felix the Cat Guy." When his father Joe Oriolo, co-creator of the modern-day Felix, died in 1985, Don took over as the CEO of the iconic cartoon franchise. Upon taking control of the franchise, Don Oriolo immediately started to implement more modern licensing, merchandising, and marketing strategies for the cartoon, and sought to bring Felix into a global market. Oriolo particularly focused on the Asian cartoon market, where Felix is now "especially popular."

Some of the new marketing strategies included writing and producing a feature film, 1988's Felix the Cat: The Movie, as well as the straight-to-video film Felix the Cat Saves Christmas. He also has executive produced a series of cartoon television shows, including The Twisted Tales of Felix the Cat (along with Phil Roman; Oriolo is also credited with writing and performing the theme song), and Baby Felix, which was released in Japan in 2000. Oriolo created the brand for Baby Felix, including acting as a writer, style guide and overall character creator for the series. Additionally, he had a hand in producing a Betty Boop and Felix comic strip during the mid-1980s. He had licensing deals with Dairy Queen, Carl's Jr., and Wendy's to include Felix toys in the respective fast food chains' kids meals, and struck a deal with Hudson Soft to produce a Felix video game for the Nintendo Entertainment System and Game Boy, in which he was credited with the concept, storyline, and character designs. The game won "Best New Nintendo Game of the Year" in 1988. He wrote and produced the successful Felix the Cat and Hello Kitty musical production, Felix the Cat's Musical Journey, in association with Sanrio. The show played for a rare second season in Tokyo. He was the editor-in-chief, publisher, artist and contributing writer for Felix Comics, the publishing company behind the Felix the Cat comic books. Oriolo was also a co-creator of the Coconut Fred's Fruit Salad Island! TV series for Kids' WB!.

In 2014, Oriolo entered into an agreement with DreamWorks Animation for the Felix franchise.

In 2025, Oriolo appointed Surge Licensing to make licensing, merchandising and retail programs, as well as original content for Poindexter, the former character from Felix franchise where he still retains the rights to the character.

As of 2022, Oriolo has not produced or directed any Felix the Cat cartoons or movies.

== Blue Arrow Farm ==
Blue Arrow Farm is the brainchild of Don Oriolo, a lifelong animal activist. When the decrepit farm came up for sale, he made a commitment to buy it and restore it to its state as when it was the headquarters for the Meadowlands racehorses—the difference being that his mission was to create a shelter for the horses (and every other animal for that matter) that needed rescuing from poor conditions. He took the endeavor on using his personal resources. Horses, alpaca, cows, sheep, goats, mules, chickens, ducks, and pigs who were tossed away, being sent to slaughter, were all rescued and given sanctuary by Oriolo and his staff. He also spearheaded the biggest cat rescue of over 200 cats recorded in the history of the northeast, contracting a chronic airborne illness in the process.

Blue Arrow Farm is a nonprofit 501(c)(3).

=== Collection of Oriolo's artwork books ===
- Felix the Cat's Magical Garden of Painting and Verse: A Whimsical Collection of Felix the Cat-Inspired Paintings and Poems.
- The First 500
- Another Book of Felix the Cat Paintings. GuGu Press, 2015 ISBN 978-0692561690
- Jingo: An Artistic Journey by Don Oriolo
- Felix the Cat Paintings (1st Edition)
