= I'm Gonna Prove It =

Song by The Softones
- A-side: "I'm Gonna Prove It"
- B-side: "Guns"
- Released: 1973
- Length: 3:14
- Label: Avco AV-4613
- Songwriter: M. Barkan-D. Oriolo
- Producer: Hugo & Luigi

"I'm Gonna Prove It" was a 1973 single by The Softones. It was a national hit for the group that year, registering on the Billboard Best Selling Soul Singles chart and others.

== Background ==
"I'm Gonna Prove It" was written by Mark Barkan and Don Oriolo. The single was produced by Hugo & Luigi and released on Avco 4613.

== Reception ==
The single was reviewed in the 31 March 1973 issue of Cash Box where it was in the Pick of the Week section. The reviewer said that the song could be the "You Are Everything" that the group needed to establish themselves. The potential to get into the Top 40 plus R&B charts was noted as was the "winning instrumental arrangement".

== Airplay ==
The single was a "Personal Pick" by Ray Velie at KFJL in Oklahoma.

== Charts ==
The single made its debut at No. 63 in the Cash Box R&B Top 65 chart for the week of 7 April 1973. It peaked at No. 60 for the week of 21 April.

The song made its debut at No. 47 in the Billboard Best Selling Soul Singles chart for the week of 14 April. It peaked at No. 44 the following week.

The single debuted at No. 58 in the Record World R&B Singles chart for the week of 21 April. It peaked at No. 56 for the week of 28 April.
