= Christopher Jackson (actor) =

American actor (born 1975)

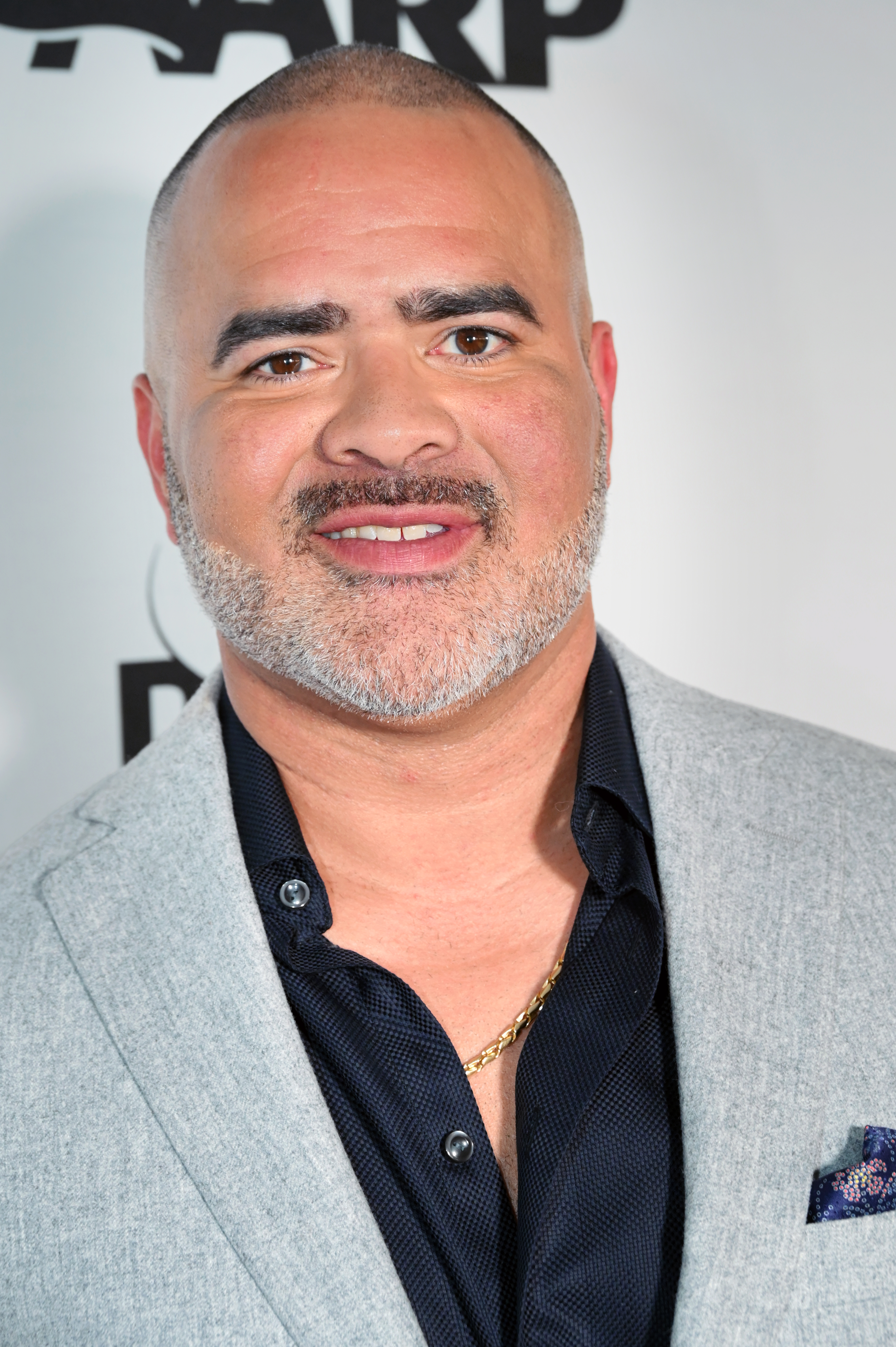
- Jackson in 2026
- Born: Christopher Neal Jackson; September 30, 1975 (age 51); Metropolis, Illinois, U.S.
- Other name: Chris Jackson
- Education: American Musical and Dramatic Academy
- Occupations: Actor; singer
- Years active: 1996–present
- Known for: In the Heights; Hamilton; Bull
- Spouse: Veronica (m. 2004)
- Children: 2

Christopher Neal Jackson (born September 30, 1975) is an American actor and singer. He began his career in 1995 starring in the Off-Broadway musical Time and the Wind by composer Galt MacDermot at the age of 20. He made his Broadway debut in 1997 as an ensemble member in the original Broadway cast of Disney's The Lion King. He remained with the show for several years, ultimately taking over the role of Simba. He went on to perform leading roles in several more Broadway musicals and plays, including After Midnight, Bronx Bombers, Holler If Ya Hear Me, and Memphis. He drew critical acclaim in several projects with Lin-Manuel Miranda: originating the roles of Benny in In the Heights and George Washington in the smash hit Hamilton. For the latter role he was nominated for a Tony Award for Best Featured Actor in a Musical. He also collaborated with Miranda on the Disney film Moana in which he provides the singing voice of Chief Tui. His other film work includes secondary roles in After.Life and Tracers.

Jackson starred as Chunk Palmer in the main cast of the CBS television drama Bull between 2016–2022. His other television work includes the recurring role of Perry Loftus in the HBO prison drama Oz and guest appearances on Fringe, Gossip Girl, Nurse Jackie, The Good Wife and White Collar. Also active as a film and television composer, he won a Daytime Emmy Award for Outstanding Original Song for "What I Am" for the children's television program Sesame Street. He has also written music for LL Cool J, Sean Kingston, and will.i.am. In 2018, Jackson received an Honorary Doctor of Fine Arts from Oglethorpe University in Atlanta, Georgia.

== Early life and education ==
Jackson was born in Metropolis, Illinois, and raised in Cairo, Illinois, by his mother, Jane Adams, a vocal music teacher, and stepfather Herbert Michael Hodges. In 1993 he graduated from Cairo High School. While a student there, he performed in plays and was encouraged to pursue a career as an actor by one of his high school teachers, Lynn Steveson, who also led the school's debate team of which Jackson was a part. She also cast him in a production of Arthur Miller's The Crucible. He credits Pilots basketball coach Larry Baldwin and Pastor Larry Potts of Mighty Rivers Regional Worship Center and would often run away to his best friends John Lairds house and found comfort in the home of Esther Laird, as other important mentors during his formative years in Cairo.

After graduating from high school, Jackson attended the American Musical and Dramatic Academy in New York City.

== Career ==
Jackson began his career in 1995 starring in the Off-Broadway musical Time and the Wind by composer Galt MacDermot of Hair fame. He made his Broadway debut in 1997 as an ensemble member and the understudy for Simba in the Original Broadway Cast of The Lion King. He later took over the role of Simba in 2000. He then did work in the theater scenes in Chicago and Minneapolis–Saint Paul, notably earning a BATC Award nomination for Best Actor for Beggar's Holiday in 2004 for and winning a Joseph Jefferson Award (Chicago's equivalent to the Tony Awards) in 2006 for Comfortable Shoes. In 2007 he returned to New York to join the cast of the Off-Broadway musical In the Heights as Benny. The cast won the 2007 Drama Desk Award for Outstanding Ensemble Performance. He continued with the show when it moved to Broadway in 2008.

In 2009 Jackson was tapped to write music for the revived children's television program The Electric Company. In 2012 he returned to Broadway as Delray in Memphis, and in 2013 he replaced Everett Bradley as "Diga Diga Doo" in the Broadway musical After Midnight. In 2013 he appeared as Derek Jeter and Bobby Sturges in the Eric Simonson's Off-Broadway play Bronx Bombers at Primary Stages. He remained with the production when it moved to Broadway in 2014. That same year he portrayed Vertus in the short lived Broadway musical Holler If Ya Hear Me which was based on the life of Tupac.

In 2015, Jackson originated the role of President George Washington in the musical Hamilton on Broadway. He was nominated for a Tony Award and concluded his run on November 13, 2016 being replaced by Nicholas Christopher. Beginning with the 2016–2017 season, he played Chunk Palmer in the CBS courtroom drama Bull until the series' conclusion.6 Jackson's film and TV work includes Moana, Tracers, The Good Wife, Person of Interest, A Gifted Man, and Nurse Jackie. He is also a member of hip-hop group Freestyle Love Supreme. He has been nominated for three Emmy Awards for composing music and lyrics for television; he won the “Outstanding Original Song” Emmy Award in 2011 for his lyrics to "What I Am," which he co-wrote for Sesame Street with Bill Sherman. The success led to a first look deal at CBS Studios.

In February 2021, Jackson signed with Nickelodeon to compose the NOGGIN SVOD original series Rhymes Through Times, which features Nick's preschool characters in a Broadway extravaganza recreating the stories of the greatest heroes of America, specifically focusing on Black history. The animation for the show was done by LionForge Animation LLC. who have previously worked on the Oscar-winning Netflix movie Hair Love. The second season dropped on March 7, 2022. From June to November 2025, he made his Broadway return as Davis in Hell's Kitchen. He’s set to rejoin the cast of Hamilton from September 8, 2026 to January 3, 2027.

== Personal life ==
In 2004, after meeting through a production of In the Heights, Jackson married actress and singer Veronica. Before the first run-through of the Off-Broadway production of In the Heights, Jackson learned that his son had been diagnosed with autism. Jackson and his wife are advocates for KultureCity: a nonprofit promoting acceptance and inclusion of all individuals regardless of their abilities. They have one son, C. J., and one daughter, Jadelyn. They live in Scarsdale, New York.

== Acting credits ==
=== Theatre ===
Year	Production	Role	Category	Notes
1997–2000	The Lion King	Featured soloist	Broadway	Understudy Simba
2000–02	The Lion King	Simba	Broadway	
2003–04	The Lion King	Ensemble	National tour	
2004	Beggar's Holiday	Happy Mac	California	
2004	Comfortable Shoes	Clay Harris	Chicago	
2005	Candide	Ensemble	Off-Broadway	
2005	Patience	Duke of Dunstable	Off-Broadway	
2005	In the Heights	Benny	Workshop	
2005	In the Heights	Benny	Regional	
2007	In the Heights	Benny	Off-Broadway	
2008–09	In the Heights	Benny	Broadway	
2010–11	In the Heights	Benny	Broadway	
2012	Memphis	Delray	Broadway	
2012	Dreamgirls	Curtis Taylor Jr.	The Muny	
2012	Lonely, I'm Not	Performer	Off-Broadway	
2013	The Jammer	Charlie Heartbreak	Off-Broadway	
2013	In the Heights	Benny	United Palace	Concert
2013	Hamilton	George Washington	Workshop	
2013	After Midnight	Special Guest Star	Broadway	
2013	Bronx Bombers	Bobby Sturges/Derek Jeter	Off-Broadway	
2014	Bronx Bombers	Bobby Sturges/Derek Jeter	Broadway	
2014	Holler if Ya Hear Me	Vertus	Broadway	
2015	Hamilton	George Washington	Off-Broadway	
2015–16; 2026-2027	Hamilton	George Washington	Broadway	
2019	Freestyle Love Supreme	C-Jack	Broadway	Cameo at certain performances
2021	Freestyle Love Supreme	C-Jack	Broadway	Cameo at certain performances
2025	Hell’s Kitchen	Davis	Broadway	
2026	Celebrity Autobiography: In Their Own Words	Performer	Broadway	

=== Film ===
Year	Title	Role	Notes
2009	After.Life	Neal	
2012	You'll Be a Man...	—N/a	Composer, documentary
2013	Broken Aster	—N/a	Composer, short film
2015	Tracers	Lonnie	
2016	Moana	Chief Tui (singing voice)	
2020	Hamilton	George Washington	Filmed recording of the 2016 Broadway musical
2021	In the Heights	Mister Softee	Cameo
2021	Tick, Tick... Boom!	TTB Concert Attendee	Cameo
2023	World's Best	Corey	
2024	Boundary Waters	Sam	

=== Television ===
Year	Title	Role	Notes
2003	Oz	Perry Loftus	5 episodes
2009	The Electric Company	—N/a	Music director
2009	Fringe	EMT #1	Episode: "Unleashed"
2010	Nurse Jackie	Trey	Episode: "Bleeding"
2010	White Collar	Nico	Episode: "Unfinished Business"
2010–2014	Sesame Street	Justin Bieber Muppet (2011)	Composer
2011	A Gifted Man	Rafael Douglas	Episode: "In Case of Discomfort"
2014	Person of Interest	Farrow	Episode: "Provenance"
2014	The Good Wife	Michael Wood	Episode: "The Trial"
2016–2022	Bull	Chester "Chunk" Palmer	Main Cast
2018–2019	The Lion Guard	Shujaa & Kitendo (voice)	3 episodes
2019	When They See Us	Peter Rivera	Episode: "Part Two"
2020	Vampirina	Headless Horseman (voice)	Episode: "A Tale of Two Hallows"
2020, 2022	Central Park	Glorious Gary	2 episodes
2021–2025	And Just Like That...	Herbert Wexley	25 episodes
2026	Ghosts	Anthony Valerie	Episode: "Michael Jackson Goes to HR"
2026	The Late Show with Stephen Colbert	Himself	Episode: "May 13, 2026"

=== Discography ===
- In the Heights, 2009
- In the Name of Love, 2011
- Hamilton, 2015
- Moana, 2016
- "Life is Sweet" (Fearless, Mandy Gonzalez), 2017
- "That Parenting Musical", 2026

== Awards and nominations ==
Year	Award	Category	Work	Result
2004	BATC Award	Best Actor	Beggar's Holiday	Nominated
2006	Joseph Jefferson Award	Best Actor	Comfortable Shoes	Won
2006	Black Theater Alliance Award	Best Actor	Comfortable Shoes	Nominated
2007	Drama Desk Award	Outstanding Ensemble Performance	In the Heights	Won
2011	Daytime Emmy Award	Outstanding Original Song for A Children's Series	Sesame Street	Nominated
2011	Daytime Emmy Award	Outstanding Original Song for A Children's Series	Sesame Street	Won
2014	Daytime Emmy Award	Outstanding Original Song for A Children's Series	Sesame Street	Nominated
2016	Tony Award	Best Featured Actor in a Musical	Hamilton	Nominated
2016	Grammy Award	Best Musical Theater Album	Hamilton	Won
2016	Broadway.com Audience Award	Favorite Featured Actor in a Musical	Hamilton	Nominated

== See also ==
- African-American Tony nominees and winners
