= Coconut Fred's Fruit Salad Island! =

Animated television series

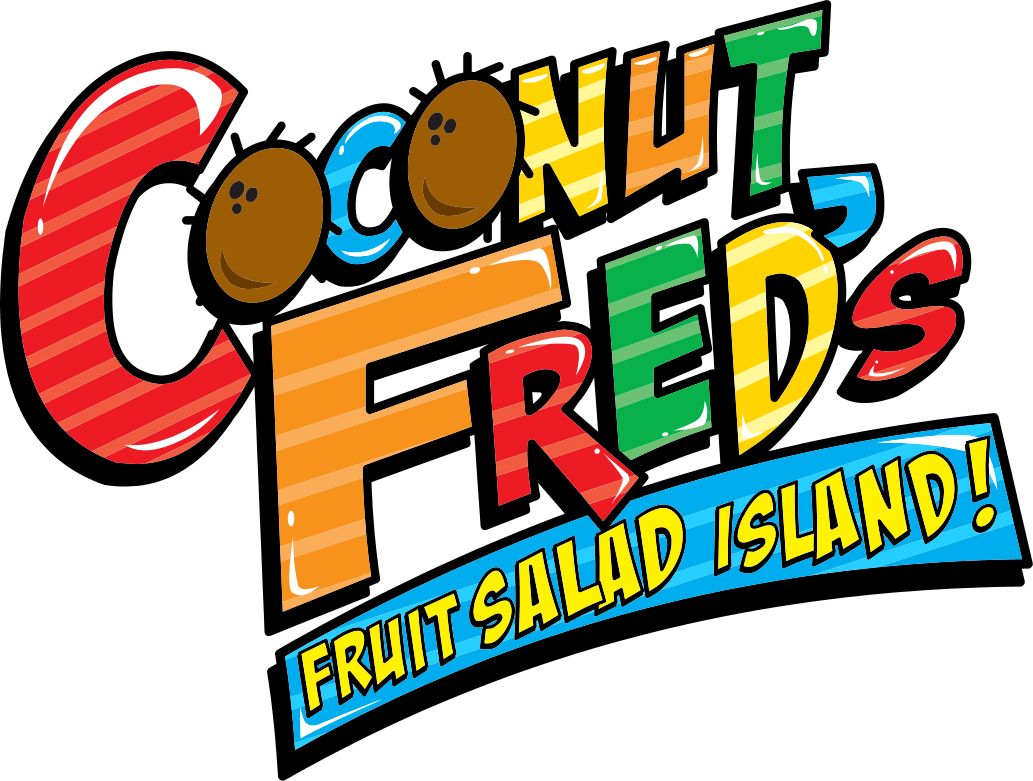
- Genre: Surreal comedy Slapstick
- Created by: Sammy Oriti; Don Oriolo
- Developed by: Ray DeLaurentis
- Written by: Ray DeLaurentis; Will Schifrin
- Directed by: Matt Danner; Michael Hack (voice director: USA); Michael Donovan (voice director: Canada)
- Voices of: Rob Paulsen; Michael Donovan; Eric Bauza; Tracey Moore (first two episodes); Britt McKillip (rest of series); Brian Drummond; David Kaye
- Countries of origin: United States; Canada (Note: Although not mentioned on the site, it is still stated at the ending credits.)
- No. of seasons: 2
- No. of episodes: 13 (25 segments)

Production
- Executive producer: Sander Schwartz
- Producers: Aaron Simpson; Margaret Dean
- Running time: 21 minutes (9–10 minutes per segment)
- Production companies: Warner Bros. Family Entertainment; Warner Bros. Animation

Original release
- Network: Kids' WB! (United States); Teletoon (Canada)
- Release: September 17, 2005 – May 27, 2006

Coconut Fred's Fruit Salad Island! (or simply Coconut Fred or CFFSI) is an animated television series created by Sammy Oriti and Don Oriolo that aired for two seasons on Kids' WB from September 17, 2005, to May 27, 2006. The show was produced by Warner Bros. Animation with flash animation provided by Dong Yang Animation (which also did the intro), Studio B Productions, and Top Draw Animation.

This show premiered on Kids' WB alongside Johnny Test and Loonatics Unleashed.

== Premise ==
Coconut Fred's Fruit Salad Island! takes place on an island inhabited exclusively by anthropomorphic fruits. The residents enjoy their own tropical paradise without a care in the world; they must share their peaceful utopia with Coconut Fred, a whimsical, blissfully foolish coconut with the ability to materialize anything he thinks about. The plot revolves around the adventures of Fred and his friends, as his imagination springs to life while his friends struggle to cover up the collateral damage.

== Characters ==
The main characters of the series. (Coconut Fred, Slip and Slide D'Peel, Bingo Cherry, Bunga Berry and Mel Greenrind)

=== Main ===
- Coconut Fred (voiced by Rob Paulsen) is a happy-go-lucky and energetic anthropomorphic coconut with a very strange imagination. Fred is able to turn whatever he imagines into reality. He can often be heard saying, "Yay, me!" and "Now you're talking, coconut!"
- Slip and Slide D'Peel (both voiced by Eric Bauza) are hillbilly banana brothers. They are much less intelligent than the rest of the cast, and often take things too seriously. They are in a band with Fred called Coconut Fred's All-Body Sound Band, whose music consists mainly of bodily sounds (burping, armpit noises, gargling, etc.).
- Bingo Cherry (voiced by Tracey Moore for the first two episodes and by Britt McKillip for the remainder of the series) is a shy and timid cherry. Bingo usually hangs out with his friends Fred, Slip and Slide and Bunga Berry. He is easily terrified, something that Fred does not know and usually provokes.
- Mr. Mel Greenrind (voiced by Michael Donovan) is a very strict watermelon. Most commonly assisted by Bingo, Greenrind routinely attempts to keep everything and everyone in order on the island with his chart of rules known as the squeaky board very seriously.
- Wedgie (voiced by Brian Drummond) is an accident-prone lemon who works as a sailor. He ended up on Fruit Salad Island due to Fred's intervention. Wedgie spends a great deal of time talking to "Betty", a wooden figurehead. He often fabricates plans to escape from the island, all of which are foiled by Fred's antics, either directly or indirectly.
- Bunga Berry (voiced by David Kaye) is a wild strawberry who communicates exclusively in grunts and growls. Despite this, everyone is still able to understand what he is saying, and Bunga is docile enough to interact with other islanders calmly.

=== Recurring ===
- Butchy (voiced by Eric Bauza) is a gravenstein apple. He is well-known for being the island's resident troublemaker and bully and his pride in said fact. He really enjoys bullying and antagonizing others, especially Bingo.
- Black Berry (voiced by Brian Drummond) is a blackberry and Butchy's secretary. His name is a pun on the name of the BlackBerry Personal digital assistant.
- Tiffany Pears (voiced by Britt McKillip) is a pear singer whose music is liked by everybody except Mr. Greenrind. She is a parody of Britney Spears.
- B.L. Tomato (voiced by Ashleigh Ball) is an outcast tomato wondering if he is a fruit or a vegetable. His most prominent role is in the Season 2 episode "Captain Nut and the Power Fruits", where he joins Blendar, Captain Nut's archenemy, and turns to the dark side as the Tomatonator.
- Rusty Candu (voiced by David Kaye) is one of Fred's friends. He is a can of fruit. His only appearances are in the intro, "Hocus Pocus Lack of Focus", "Amuse-Otel", and "Fred Rules!" (in a cameo).
- Slurpy (voiced by Scott McNeil) is a fruit bat who is bent on eating Fruit Salad Island inhabitants. He is afraid of light.
- Melonie Greenrind (voiced by Kelly Sheridan) is Mr. Greenrind's perky niece. She likes to enforce rules even more seriously than her uncle and carries around a very noisy chalkboard.
- Vic (voiced by Garry Chalk) is an alien from Loft Lost 57 in the Sasaft Quadrant in the depths of other space who appears in "Turn on Your Nut Light" as the main antagonist. Originally planning to invade the island with his spaceship fleet, he was mistaken as a tourist to Fred and the island, and due to him and his friends playing in his ship and almost destroying it by going into black holes and ramming into asteroids, he aborted the invasion, causing Fred to crash the ship into Mr. Greenrind's sand castle cabana.
- Mrs. Plumcott (voiced by Kathleen Barr) is an elderly, small, chipper plum lady of the island. She strongly dislikes Mr. Greenrind.
- Dr. Bartlett (voiced by Brian Drummond impersonating Ed Wynn) is a pear dentist on Fruit Salad Island.

== Reception ==
Despite some critics praising the animation and creativity, as well as some elements of the comedy, the series has been criticized for its often loud, over-the-top humor, with many unfavorably comparing it to SpongeBob SquarePants. Joly Herman of Common Sense Media posted a review of Coconut Fred's Fruit Salad Island on Disney's Go.com. The review describes the show as "the TV equivalent of sugary cereal, and nothing more", and gives the show 2 stars out of 5.

== Series overview ==
Season	Segments	Episodes	Originally released	
Season	Segments	Episodes	First released	Last released
1	18	9	September 17, 2005	November 26, 2005
2	7	4	May 6, 2006	May 27, 2006

== Episodes ==
Each episode was directed by Matt Danner.

=== Season 1 (2005) ===
No. overall	No. in season	Title	Written by	Storyboard by	Original release date
1a	1a	"No News is Good News!"	Ray DeLaurentis	Eddie Trigueros	September 17, 2005
Coconut Fred becomes a news reporter.
1b	1b	"Master of Disaster"	Ray DeLaurentis	Ricky Garduno	September 17, 2005
A new volcano is on the island and the gang must stop it before it erupts.
2a	2a	"Hocus Pocus Lack of Focus"	Will Schifrin	Gabe Swarr	September 24, 2005
Fred tries to be a magician.
2b	2b	"Amuse-Otel"	Ray DeLaurentis	Sandra Frame	September 24, 2005
Fred builds a cross between an amusement park and a hotel, and gets Mr. Greenrind to come along.
3a	3a	"Fruit Canal"	Will Schifrin	Ricky Garduno	October 1, 2005
Bingo Cherry needs to go to the dentist after he gets a toothache.
3b	3b	"Lemon Overboard!"	Ray DeLaurentis	Rob Schrab	October 1, 2005
Fred tries to help out Wedgie.
4a	4a	"Fred Rules!"	Ray DeLaurentis and Will Schifrin	Eddie Trigueros	October 8, 2005
Mr. Greenrind leaves Fred in charge of the rules board.
4b	4b	"Monster Island"	Eddie Guzelian	Sandra Frame	October 8, 2005
Fred and the gang visit Monster Island.
5a	5a	"A Bad Case of the Fruitcups"	Will Schifrin	Ray Morelli and Eddie Trigueros	October 29, 2005
Mr. Greenrind catches the hiccups.
5b	5b	"Fruity Booty"	Ray DeLaurentis; Story by : Steve Slavkin	Sandra Frame	October 29, 2005
Fred and his friends go on a Treasure Hunt.
6a	6a	"Nutcase"	Ray DeLaurentis and Will Schifrin	Ricky Garduno	November 5, 2005
Fred becomes a detective.
6b	6b	"One Bad Apple"	Ray DeLaurentis and Will Schifrin	Rob Schrab	November 5, 2005
Butchy intimidates the island and especially Bingo.
7a	7a	"Bananas for Golf"	Story by : Matt Danner; Teleplay by : Ray DeLaurentis	Eddie Trigueros	November 12, 2005
Mr. Greenrind just wants to spend a peaceful day golfing, but Fred and the banana brothers ruin his plans.
7b	7b	"Fruitball Heroes"	R.J. Colleary	Gabe Swarr	November 12, 2005
The gang plays Fruitball at the Island Stadium.
8a	8a	"A Cold Day on Fruit Salad Island"	Ray DeLaurentis	Ricky Garduno	November 19, 2005
Fred gets sick during the Island Carnival, and has to find a cure before the carnival is over.
8b	8b	"5 Nuts and a Baby"	Will Schifrin	Dave Cunningham	November 19, 2005
The gang finds a Fruit Bat and tries to parent it.
9a	9a	"Banana Cabana"	Will Schifrin	Kirk Van Wormer	November 26, 2005
The Banana Brothers are left to repair Mr. Greenrind's door after Fred used it for a Surfboard and destroying it.
9b	9b	"Coconut Freds"	Phillip Vaughn and Ray DeLaurentis	Sandra Frame	November 26, 2005
Fred finds a magical printer and makes duplicates of himself with it.

=== Season 2 (2006) ===
No. overall	No. in season	Title	Written by	Storyboard by	Original release date
10	1	"Captain Nut & the Power Fruits"	Ray DeLaurentis and Will Schifrin	Ricky Garduno and Eddie Trigueros	May 6, 2006
Fred and the gang become super heroes to defeat Blendark.
11a	2a	"Monkey Business"	Ray DeLaurentis	Dave Cunningham	May 13, 2006
A rude baboon upsets the fruits of the island.
11b	2b	"Sir Nutalot"	Will Schifrin	Sandra Frame	May 13, 2006
After Fred and the gang wish to be in a video game, they have to rescue Princess Greenrind (Mr. Greenrind as Princess Peach) from Butchy (as Sephiroth). Fred is dressed as Cloud, Slip & Slide as Mario and Luigi and Bingo is dressed as Navi.
12a	3a	"One Fruit's Trash is Another Fruit's Treasure"	Ray DeLaurentis	Jay Baker	May 20, 2006
Mr. Greenrind forbids Fred from collecting bottle caps.
12b	3b	"Turn on Your Nut Light"	Will Schifrin	Gabe Swarr	May 20, 2006
Fred summons an alien.
13a	4a	"The Ripley Van Ripend Book of World Records"	Ray DeLaurentis	Ray Morelli and Eddie Trigueros	May 27, 2006
Sad that he is the only islander to not have broken a record, Fred tries to show Mr. Ripley Van Ripend that he can attain a world record.
13b	4b	"Frozen in Time"	Dan Danko & Tom Mason	Ricky Garduno	May 27, 2006
The fruits travel through time.
