= Diane (Golden Gate song) =

Single by The Golden Gate

from the album Year One
- A-side: "Diane"
- B-side: "Make Your Own Sweet Music"
- Released: 1970
- Length: 3:02
- Songwriters: B. Carl, R. Whitelaw, R. Bell
- Producers: Whitelaw & Carl Productions, Inc.

The Golden Gate singles chronology
"Diane" (1970)	"Monday After Sunday" (1970)

"Diane" is a 1970 single for The Golden Gate. It was a hit for the group that year, registering on multiple charts.

== Background ==
"Diane" was composed by Billy Carl, Reid Whitelaw and Richard Bell. It was backed with "Make Your Own Sweet Music". Both sides were produced by Whitelaw & Carl Productions. They were released on single, Audio Fidelity AF 161 in February 1970. The single is from the Year One album.

While attending the Midem festival, Cyril Gee the managing director for music publisher Belwin-Mills had picked up "Diane" for countries other than the United States and Canada. It was also reported in the 14 March issue of Cash Box that "Diane" was released in the UK on the RCA label.

== Reception ==
Along with "Listen Here" by Jay Jackson & the Heads of Our Time, "Diane" was a Manufacturers' Chart Prediction in Billboard for the week of 7 February 1970.

The single was a Four Star Pick in the 14 February issue of Record World. Solid success was predicted for the single.

"Diane" was reviewed in the 14 February issue of Cash Box. It was positive with the reviewer writing that the sweet surface styling and the flashing tempo could give it Top 40 breakouts.

A Billboard Top 60 Spotlight for the week of 28 February, the reviewer said that it had all the makings of a big one and called it a solid beat rocker that was loaded with bubblegum appeal. The chart potential was also noted.

== Airplay ==
It was reported in the 14 March issue of Record World that Diane was a Top Ten Smash at WTIX in New Orleans. It was also in the Top 20 at stations, WLOF, WAYS, WABB, WACL, WIRL and WORD. The following week, Record World reported that it was a regional hit in Charlotte, New Orleans. It was also reported by Billboard for the week of 28 February that the single was a regional breakout in New Orleans.

== Charts ==
=== Record World Singles Coming Up ===
"Diane" made its debut at No. 44 in the Record World Singles Coming Up chart for the week of 21 February 1970.

=== Record World 100 Top Pops ===
"Diane" debuted at No. 100 in the Record World 100 Top Pops chart for the week of 7 March 1970. In its third week on 21 March, it peaked at No. 97. It maintained a chart presence for one more week.

=== Billboard Bubbling Under the Hot 100 ===
"Diane" debuted at No. 105 in the Billboard Bubbling Under the Hot 100 chart for the week of 14 March. The following week it dropped down to No. 113.

=== Cash Box Looking Ahead ===
"Diane" debuted at No. 23 in the Cash Box Looking Ahead chart for the week of 21 February 1970. It peaked at No. 4 for the week of 14 March during its six-week run.
