= Time and the Wind (musical) =

Time and the Wind is a musical revue by composer Galt MacDermot and lyricist by Norman Matlock. Directed and choreographed by Louis Johnson with musical direction by MacDermot, the show premiered Off-Broadway at the John Houseman Studio Theater on July 27, 1995, with costumes by Bernard Johnson and lighting by Deborah Constantine. The show was produced by Eric Krebs and AMAS Musical Theater Inc. It starred Christopher Jackson, Carol Denise, Russell Joel Brown, Suzanne Griffin, Johnetta Alston, and Carl Hall. In his review in The New York Times, Stephen Holden wrote, "The show calls itself "a New York musical revue," but aside from "Gentle Rain," which compares people to cockroaches, the lyrics include few references to urban life. The predominant musical style is the gospel-flavored pop-soul that flourished 25 years ago but has long since been usurped by funk, rap and hip-hop."

== Plot ==
The show follows the relationship arcs of three unidentified romantic couples: a young streetwise couple, a 30-something yuppie pair, and a middle-aged argumentative couple.

== Musical numbers ==
- 'Time and the Wind'
- "Mais Qui'
- 'I Came to Town'
- 'Gentle Rain'
- 'By the Time I Forget Her'
- 'Now I am Ready (Flustered)'
- 'My Key Doesn't Fit The Lock'
- 'I Am Not Gone'
- 'There Are Times'
- 'Should I Tell Him'
- 'If What I Saw'
- 'They Didn't Ask'
- 'Quittin' Time'
- 'What Can I Say'
- 'I've Seen People Like Them Before'
- 'Ah, It's Love'
- 'When You Love Really'
- 'Tell Her You Care'
- 'Send Me You'
- 'Funky Dance'
- 'When I Was A Child'
- 'Level With You'
- "I Was Taught To Love'
- 'Flowers In Your Hair'
- 'What You Look Like'
- 'I Love You'
- 'True Love's Hand'
- 'Wanted to Dine'
- 'There Are Girls'
- 'Goodbye'
- 'According To The Plan'
- 'Finale'

Several of the songs are available on the 2022 digital release The Black Songs.
