= Baby You Belong to Me =

"baby You Belong to Me"

Single by Magic Touch
- A-side: "Baby You Belong to Me"
- B-side: "Lost and Lonely Boy"
- Published: 1973
- Released: 1973
- Length: 3:45
- Label: Roulette R-7143
- Songwriter: Barkan - Whitelaw - Oriolo
- Producers: Reid Whitelaw and Norman Bergen; In association with Opal Productions Inc. and Don Oriolo

"Baby You Belong to Me" is a 1973 single for Magic Touch. It was a chart hit for the group that year.

== Background ==
"Baby You Belong to Me" was written by Reid Whitelaw, Mark Barkan and Don Oriolo. It was backed with "Lost and Lonely Boy". Both recordings were produced by Reid Whitelaw, Norman Bergen and Don Oriolo with Bergen handling the arrangements. The record was the first release resulting from the production team of Reid Whitelaw and Norman Bergen being signed to Roulette Records.

With the record being the first release, it became the Whitelaw and Bergen team's first representation in the charts.

Magic Touch was a three-man group from New York City who were brought to Roulette Records' director of A&R, Fred Bailin.

== Reception ==
The record was reviewed in the 9 June issue of Record World where it was also in the Hits of the Week section. The production by Reid Whitelaw and Norman Bergan was referred to as tasteful. A comparison was made to The Stylistics and the Top 40 / R&B potential was also noted.

The record was in the Choice Programming section of Cash Box for the week of 23 June 1973. Choice Programming selected singles were, in the opinion of Cash Box reviewing staff to be deserving of special programmer consideration.

== Charts ==
For the week of 21 July, "Baby You Belong to Me" debuted at No. 74 on the Record World R&B Singles chart. In its second week, it peaked at No. 72 on the chart.

For the week of 21 July, "Baby You Belong to Me" debuted at No. 99 on the Billboard Hot Soul Singles chart. The song peaked at No. 82 in its fifth week on the cahrt.
