= (We'll Meet in The) Yellow Forest =

Song by Jay and the Americans
- A-side: "(We'll Meet in The) Yellow Forest"
- B-side: "Got Hung Up Along the Way"
- Released: September 15, 1967
- Length: 2:17
- Label: United Artists UP 1191
- Songwriter: B. Carl - R. Whitelaw
- Producer: Joe Wissert

"(We'll Meet in The) Yellow Forest" was a 1967 single for Jay & The Americans. It became a hit for the group that year, registering on multiple charts.

== Background ==
"(We'll Meet in The) Yellow Forest" was written by Billy Carl and Reid S. Whitelaw. Recording artists Jay and the Americans worked with producer Joe Wissert and arranger Trade Martin to record the song. It was backed with "Got Hung Up Along the Way" and released on United Artists UP 1191 in 1967.

It was reported in the 29 July 1967 issue of Cash Box that Koppelman-Rubin Associates had announced the previous week that Jay & The Americans first single under the company's direction with Joe Wissert directing the recording sessions had resulted in "(We’ll Meet in the) Yellow Forest". It was also noted that in the past, the independent production company with Wissert had also produced "Happy Together" and "She'd Rather Be with Me" by The Turtles, and recordings for The Lovin' Spoonful and The Righteous Brothers.

In later years, the B side "Got Hung Up Along the Way" had found popularity with the Northern Soul crowd, namely at the Wigan venue.

== Reception ==
"(We'll Meet in The) Yellow Forest" was a Chart Spotlight, one of the singles predicted to reach the Hot 100 chart for the week of 5 August.

The single was in the Pick of the Week section, had a glowing review in the 5 August issue of Cash Box with the reviewer saying that the single had a big pounding sound and spotlighted Jay and the Americans in their finest form. The single was predicted to put the group high in the pop picture.

The single was a four-star pick in the 5 August 1967 issue of Record World. Referring to the single as a rebel-rouser, the reviewer said that it should shoot straight up the charts.

Along with "There Is a Mountain" by Donovan, "Get Together" by The Youngbloods and "Sixteen Tons" by Tom Jones, "We'll Meet in The (Yellow Forest)" was one of the four picks by RPM Weekly for the week of 12 August.

== Charts ==
=== Billboard ===
"(We'll Meet in The) Yellow Forest" debuted at No. 131 in the Billboard Bubbling Under the Hot 100 chart for the week of 19 August 1967. It was also one of the twelve Regional Breakouts for that same week. It maintained its position in the Bubbling Under the Hot 100 chart for one more week.

=== Cash Box ===
The record debuted at No. 97 in the Cash Box Top 100 chart for the week of 12 August. It peaked at No. 93 the following week and remained in the chart for an additional week with its last position being 100. It then appeared at No. 32 in the Cash Box Looking Ahead chart for the week of 2 September. It had dropped off by the following week

=== Record World ===
For the week of 19 August, "(We'll Meet in The) Yellow Forest" debuted at No.85 in the Record World 100 Top Pops chart. In its second charting week, the record peaked at No. 81 for the week of 26 August.
