= Isabel's a Jezebel =

- Music: Galt MacDermot
- Lyrics: William Dumaresq
- Book: William Dumaresq
- Basis: a Grimm's Fairy Tale
- Productions: 1970 West End

Isabel's a Jezebel is a British musical with music by Galt MacDermot and book and lyrics by William Dumaresq, based loosely on one of the Grimm's Fairy Tales, centers around Isabel and her deep-sea lover, who spend their time copulating and arguing about bringing children into a world committed to death.

After out-of-town tryouts, the musical premiered on 15 December 1970 on the West End at the Duchess Theatre, running for only 61 performances. The cast included Frank Aiello, Sharon Campbell, Helen Chappelle, Peter Farrell, Carole Hayman, Michele Mowbray, Maria Popkiewitz, Miguel Sergides, Howard Wakeling. The production was co-directed by Michael Wearing and Julie Arenal, who also choreographed.

After his spectacular success with the musical Hair, expectations for MacDermot's next work, Isabel's a Jezebel, were high. The musical underwent several last minute cast changes, including Hayman's joining the show just before opening night. The New York Times praised the score but called the book "irretrievably inert."

A cast album was released in 1972 (Item 377673) Kilmarnock.

== Musical numbers ==
- More Than Earth, More Than Air
- Down by the Ocean
- Oh Fish in the Sea
- On Sand by the Sea
- Isabel's a Jezebel
- In Another Life/Nothing
- Sand
- Oh Mummy Darling
- God, It Matters Now
- The Saddest Moon
- Mama Don't Want No Baby
- These Are the Things
- Stanley Irritability
- Use My Name
- The Moon Should Be Rising Soon/The Weeds in the Wind
- My God When I Think
- Hah
- Love Knows No Season
- So Ends Our Night
