= Gershwin Theatre =

Broadway theater in Manhattan, New York

- Uris Theatre, George Gershwin Theatre
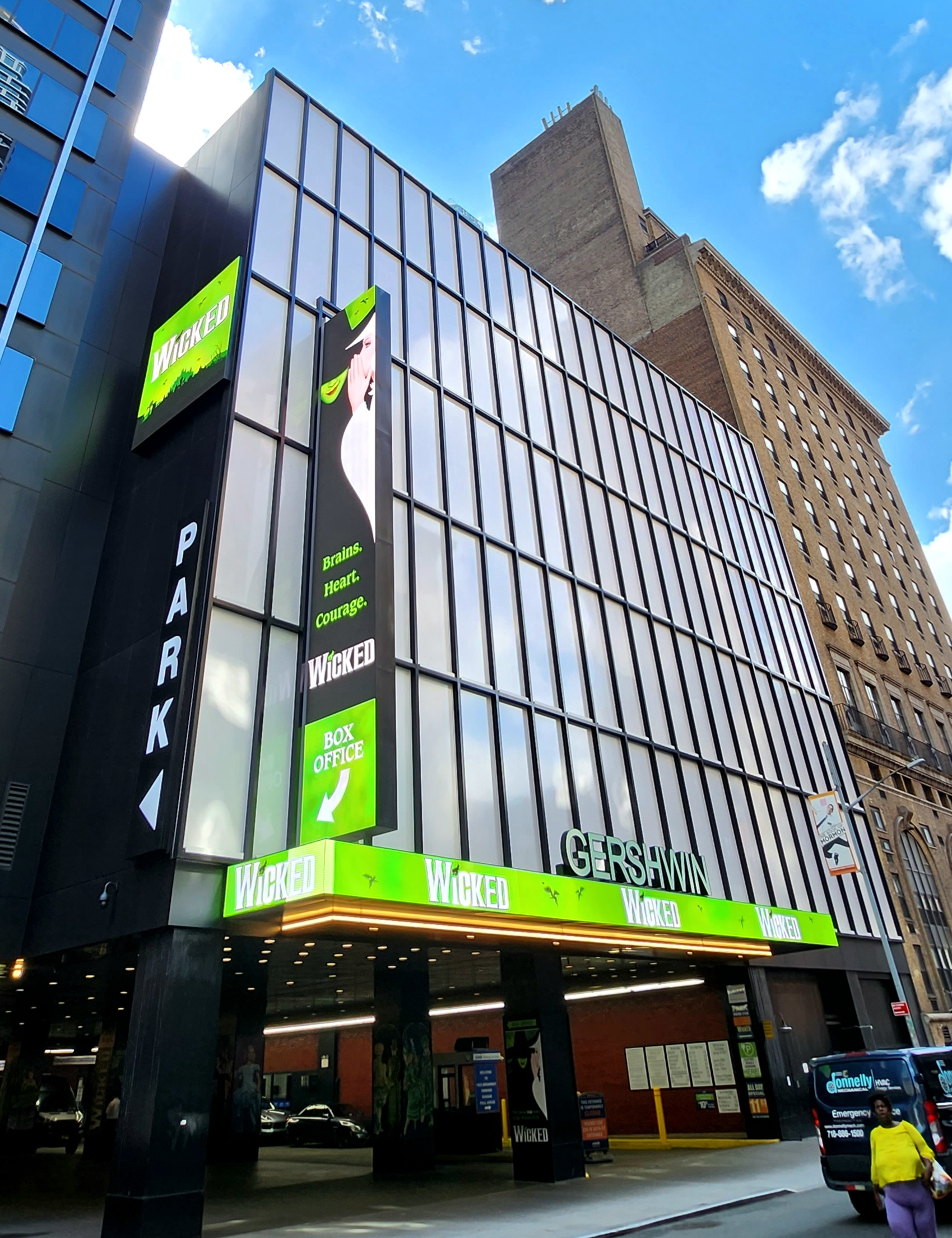
- Interactive map of Gershwin Theatre
- Former names: Uris Theatre
- Address: 222 West 51st Street; Manhattan, New York; United States
- Coordinates: 40°45′45″N 73°59′06″W
- Owner: Paramount Group
- Operator: Nederlander Organization
- Capacity: 1,933 (Note: This capacity is approximate and may vary depending on the show.)
- Type: Broadway
- Production: Wicked

Construction
- Opened: November 28, 1972 (53 years ago)
- Architect: Ralph Alswang

The Gershwin Theatre (originally the Uris Theatre) is a Broadway theater at 222 West 51st Street, on the second floor of the Paramount Plaza office building, in the Midtown Manhattan neighborhood of New York City, New York, United States. Opened in 1972, it is operated by the Nederlander Organization and is named after brothers George and Ira Gershwin, who wrote several Broadway musicals. The Gershwin is Broadway's largest theater, with approximately 1,933 seats across two levels. Over the years, it has hosted musicals, dance companies, and concerts.

The Gershwin was designed by Ralph Alswang. It was one of the first theaters constructed under the Special Theater District amendment of 1967. The theater's main entrances are from a midblock passageway that runs between 50th and 51st Streets. There are escalators leading from the ground floor to the second-story lobby and rotundas. The American Theater Hall of Fame, which contains inscriptions of the names of over 500 notable theatrical personalities, is placed within the lobby and rotundas. The Gershwin's orchestra level, which has about 1,300 seats, is more than double the size of the mezzanine level, which has about 600 seats.

The Uris Buildings Corporation built the theater within the Uris Building, now Paramount Plaza, in the 1960s in exchange for several additional floors of office space. The Uris opened on November 28, 1972, with a performance of the musical Via Galactica. Following several flops, the theater was rented out for concerts and dance specials in the 1970s. The musicals The King and I and Sweeney Todd had relatively long runs at the end of the decade. The theater was renamed the Gershwin during the 37th Tony Awards in 1983, the first of six Tony Awards ceremonies to be hosted there. In the 1980s, the theater hosted concerts; its first straight plays; and musicals such as Singin' in the Rain and Starlight Express. The theater continued to host concert appearances in the early 1990s, as well as musicals such as Show Boat, and was renovated in 1993. The Gershwin has staged the musical Wicked since 2003.

== Description ==
The Gershwin Theatre is on the second floor of Paramount Plaza, also known as 1633 Broadway, north of Times Square in the Midtown Manhattan neighborhood of New York City, New York, United States. Ralph Alswang designed the theater, which opened in 1972 as the Uris Theatre, while Emery Roth and Sons designed Paramount Plaza. It is one of two theaters in Paramount Plaza; the other is the Circle in the Square Theatre in the building's basement. The Gershwin, Circle in the Square, Minskoff, and American Place theaters were all constructed under the Special Theater District amendment of 1967 as a way to give their respective developers additional floor area.

The Gershwin was decorated in what Alswang described as an Art Nouveau style. The theater covers 50,000 ft^{2} (4,600 m^{2}) and has bronze velour decorations throughout its major public spaces. Originally decorated in white and gold, the Gershwin was redecorated in a blue-and-white color scheme in 1993. The theater is operated by the Nederlander Organization.

=== Lobbies and Hall of Fame ===
At the base of Paramount Plaza is a promenade that connects 50th and 51st Streets, providing entry to the Gershwin and Circle in the Square theaters. There are marquees for the theaters' entrances on both 50th and 51st Streets. The box office is at ground level. Escalators lead from the ground floor to the Gershwin Theater. The names of 90 celebrities who were active between 1860 and 1930 are inscribed in bronze-gold lettering along the escalators.

The second floor contains the American Theater Hall of Fame, where the names of notable theatrical personalities are inscribed in gold letters. Eligible inductees have had a career in American theater for at least 25 years and at least five major Broadway production credits. The lobby contains a white wall behind the orchestra seats and measures 220 ft (67 m) wide. The Hall of Fame's names stretch across the four-story-high wall of the lobby. The theater also has two rotundas, one of which originally contained the music and theater collections of the Museum of the City of New York. The hall's names stretch into the rotundas.

=== Auditorium ===
Playbill cites the theater as having 1,926 seats, while The Broadway League gives a figure of 1,933 seats. The Gershwin's seats are spread across two levels: an orchestra with about 1,300 seats and a smaller mezzanine with about 600 seats. (Note: According to Back Stage magazine, the theater has 1,296 seats in the orchestra and 599 in the mezzanine. However, Alswang cited the orchestra as having 1,280 seats and the mezzanine as having 660 seats.) This was based on Alswang's observation that most people wanted orchestra seats. The seats in the Gershwin are spaced 36 in (910 mm) apart from row to row, compared to in older theaters where each row was only 32 to 33 in (810 to 840 mm) apart. The balcony has 14 rows. Like traditional Broadway houses (and unlike the contemporary Minskoff Theatre), the theater had aisles in the center and along the sides. The orchestra level is ADA-accessible via an elevator from the ground story.

The mezzanine level has protrusions on the side walls instead of box seats. The proscenium arch is designed with dark panels that serve as light towers, which can be removed if necessary. The wall panels also contains panels that can be removed for the installation of speakers. The stage was also designed with a flexible layout in that it could be disassembled or extended forward. When the stage was extended forward, it basically functioned as a thrust stage, covering the orchestra pit. With a 65 ft-wide (20 m) adjustable proscenium arch and an 80 ft-wide (24 m) stage, it is one of the largest Broadway stages, ideal for very large musical productions.

Unlike older theaters in New York City, the Minskoff and Gershwin theaters were subject to less stringent building codes. For example, the Gershwin was designed without fire curtains, since the city had allowed sprinkler systems to be installed in both theaters. The theater also used Hydra-Float, a computerized rigging system. This made it the first commercial theater in the US to be completely automated. Backstage, there were eight large dressing suites for lead performers, which were equipped with air conditioning, green rooms, and private bathrooms.

== History ==
=== Construction ===
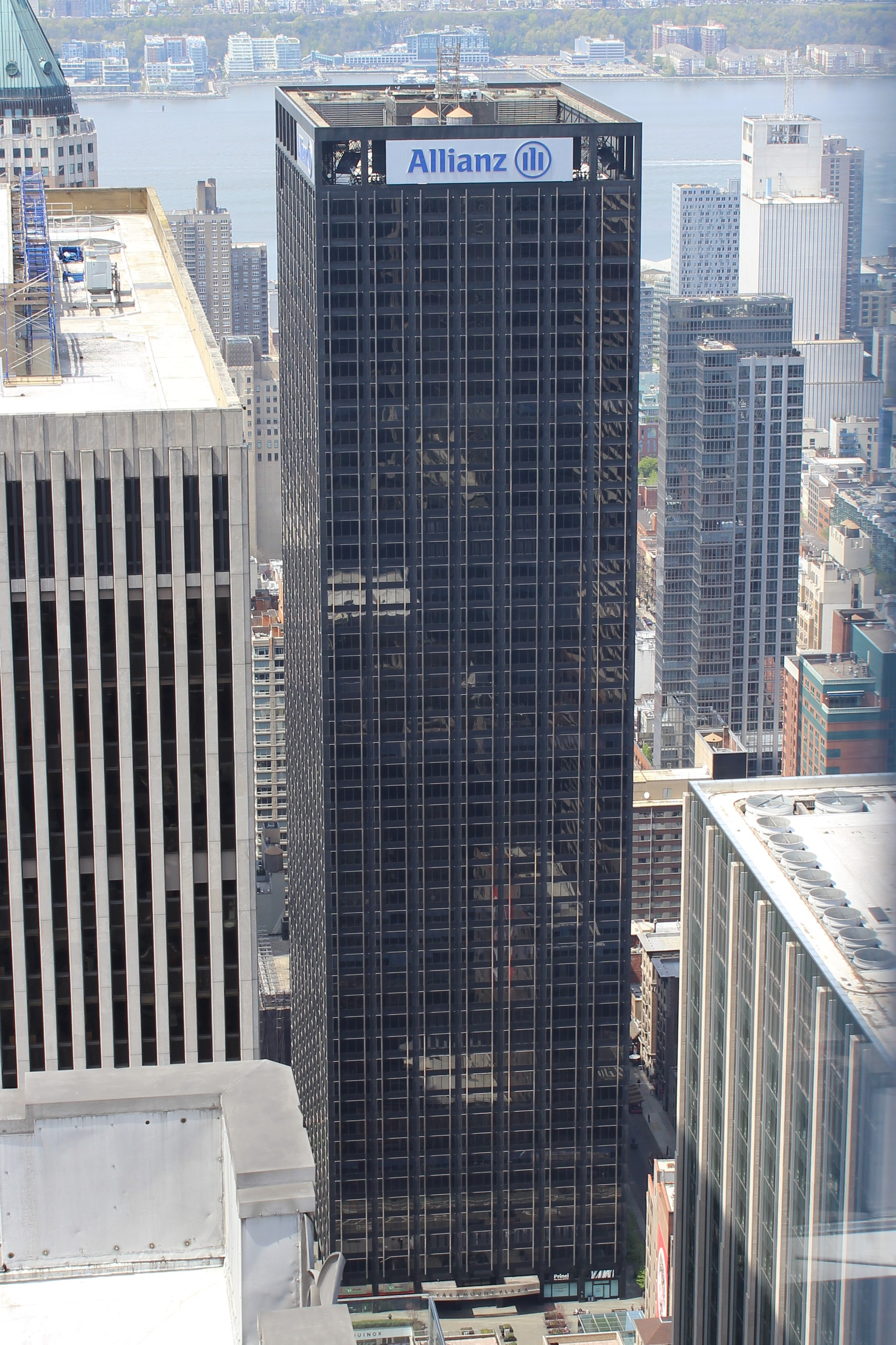
The Gershwin was built as part of the Uris Building (now Paramount Plaza).

In September 1967, Uris Buildings Corporation leased the site of the Capitol Theatre on Broadway, between 50th and 51st Streets, for 100 years. Uris announced it would build an office tower and a Broadway theater on the site. The Broadway theater would have 1,500 to 2,000 seats. In October 1967, the New York City Planning Commission (CPC) proposed the Special Theater District Zoning Amendment, which gave zoning bonuses to office-building developers who included theaters. The proposed legislation would directly allow theaters in One Astor Plaza and the Uris Building, which would be the first completely new Broadway theaters since the Mark Hellinger Theatre was completed in 1930. (Note: The Hellinger was initially a movie theater and did not become a Broadway venue until 1949. The Lunt-Fontanne Theatre and Palace Theatre were converted from movies to Broadway theaters afterward, but both theater buildings are physically older than the Hellinger. The last venue to be built as a Broadway theater, operating continuously in that capacity, was the Ethel Barrymore Theatre, completed in 1928.) The CPC approved the theater amendment that November, and the New York City Board of Estimate gave final approval to the proposal the next month. A second theater, which subsequently became the Circle in the Square, was announced in February 1968.

In April 1968, the CPC scheduled a public hearing to determine whether the Astor and Uris theater permits should be approved. Six parties testified in favor; the Shubert Organization, the largest operator of Broadway theaters, was the only dissenting speaker. The CPC approved the theaters over the Shuberts' objections, as did the Board of Estimate. That September, Uris Buildings Corporation made a tentative deal with James M. Nederlander and Gerard Oestricher to operate the larger of the building's two theaters. The larger venue was renamed for Percy Uris, head of the Uris Buildings Corporation, in 1971. The New York Daily News subsequently said that the Uris family's decision to name the theater for themselves "became an object of ridicule in theatrical circles".

Meanwhile, civic group Broadway Association had proposed constructing a theatrical hall of fame in a median island of Broadway several blocks north. Earl Blackwell then suggested that the Nederlanders include a theatrical hall of fame at the Uris Theatre. Plans for the hall were announced in March 1972, as the building and theater were being completed. The first names were inducted that October, just before the theater opened.

=== 1970s ===
The Uris Theatre was dedicated on November 19, 1972, and hosted its first show on November 28, a performance of the musical Via Galactica starring Raul Julia. The theater was cited as having 1,840, 1,870, 1,900, or 1,940 seats when it was completed. Alswang estimated the theater's total cost at $12.5 million. Despite a top ticket price of $12.75 (lower than the typical top price of $15), it flopped with seven performances and was the first Broadway show to lose a million dollars. The next show was Cy Coleman and Dorothy Fields's musical Seesaw, which opened in March 1973 and transferred to the Hellinger that August, ultimately running for 296 performances. A revival of the Sigmund Romberg operetta The Desert Song premiered at the Uris in September 1973 but closed after only 15 performances. This was followed that November by the Lerner and Loewe musical Gigi, which lasted 103 performances. For the most part, the Uris lost money during its first two seasons, since it was dark most of the time. The Uris also hosted annual ceremonies when people were inducted into the Theatrical Hall of Fame. Due to a lack of money, there were no new inductions between 1973 and 1979.

There were no new legitimate shows in 1974. After singer Sammy Davis Jr. had a highly profitable concert that May, James M. Nederlander decided to book concerts at the theater for the remainder of the year, citing its acoustic qualities. Nederlander said the theater could also be used for musicals if there was demand in the future. A New York Times critic said the Uris Building, which had just gone into foreclosure, might be a "monument to its mortality" instead of "a leader in the revitalization of Broadway". Musicians who appeared in 1974 included Mott the Hoople (performing with Queen); Enrico Macias and his La Fete Orientale Co.; Andy Williams with Michel Legrand; Anthony Newley with Henry Mancini; Johnny Mathis and the Miracles; The 5th Dimension; and Raphael. The 17th Annual Grammy Awards were presented at the Uris in March 1975, and the Dance Theatre of Harlem performed at the theater that May. Frank Sinatra, Ella Fitzgerald, and Count Basie had a limited concert appearance that September, and the Houston Grand Opera Association presented the opera Treemonisha the next month. This was followed by performances from ballet dancers Margot Fonteyn and Rudolf Nureyev, singer-songwriter Paul Anka, and the American Ballet Theatre.

The Dance Theatre of Harlem returned to the theater in March 1976. The D'Oyly Carte Opera Company presented three Gilbert and Sullivan operettas at the Uris that May, followed the next month by a concert appearance from Al Green and Ashford & Simpson. That October, the Houston Grand Opera presented the musical Porgy and Bess. The theater went back to hosting concerts, with appearances by Bing Crosby and Barry Manilow in December 1976. The Dance Theatre of Harlem canceled a planned 1977 season at the Uris due to a financial deficit. Instead, Nureyev returned in March 1977 for a ballet performance, and Béjart: Ballet of the Twentieth Century performed the same month. The musical The King and I, with Yul Brynner and Constance Towers, opened in May 1977 and ran for 719 performances, becoming the theater's longest-running show. Another long-lasting show was Stephen Sondheim and Hugh Wheeler's musical Sweeney Todd with Angela Lansbury, which opened in March 1979 and ran for 557 performances over the next year.

=== 1980s ===
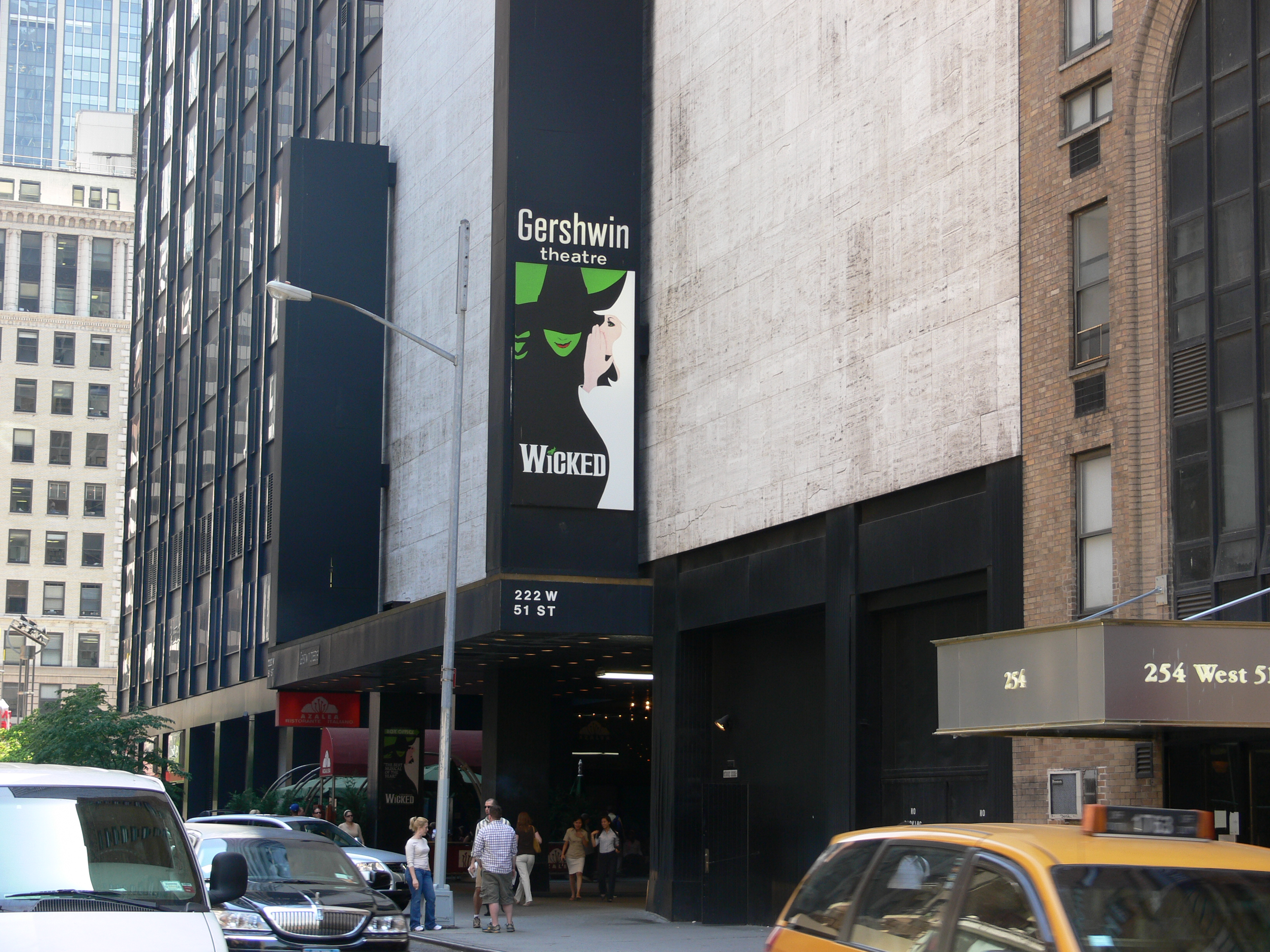
The theater as seen from 51st Street

In 1980, the Uris mostly hosted performances by ballet companies. The following January, the New York Shakespeare Festival produced Gilbert & Sullivan's The Pirates of Penzance, which relocated to the Minskoff in August 1981. This was followed immediately afterward by a revival of Lerner and Loewe's My Fair Lady, with Rex Harrison, which lasted 124 performances. That November, the musical Annie transferred to the Uris; it ran for over a year, concluding its run of 2,377 performances there. Next, Nureyev performed with the Boston Ballet in early 1983, and the Houston Grand Opera presented Jerome Kern and Oscar Hammerstein II's musical Show Boat that April. At that time, Tony Awards producer Alexander H. Cohen announced that the 37th Tony Awards ceremony would be hosted there and that the Uris would be renamed after musical-writing brothers Ira and George Gershwin. During the ceremony on June 5, 1983, the theater was rededicated. Show Boat closed shortly thereafter and was followed in July by Mame, featuring Lansbury.

The Gershwin hosted a memorial for Ira Gershwin after he died in August 1983, two months after the theater's renaming. The theater continued to face issues with booking extended runs of large musicals. In January 1984, Nederlander announced he would again use it as a concert hall for a year. This time, the theater hosted performances from Shirley MacLaine; Twyla Tharp; Rudolf Nureyev; and Gladys Knight & the Pips with Kashif. In addition, the theater hosted the 38th Tony Awards in June 1984. The Royal Shakespeare Company presented Much Ado about Nothing and Cyrano de Bergerac in repertory for ten weeks starting in October 1984. The theater was acoustically modified for these plays, as it was the first time the theater had hosted straight plays. This was followed in early 1985 by concert appearances from Patti LaBelle and Smokey Robinson. Next, the musical Singin' in the Rain opened in July 1985 and ran for 367 performances over the next ten months.

After Andrew Lloyd Webber's musical Starlight Express was announced for the theater in mid-1986, the theater was renovated to accommodate the technologically complex set. Starlight opened in March 1987 and ran for two years, closing at a loss. Afterward, the Nederlanders announced plans to use the Gershwin as a concert hall for the 1989–1990 season. At the time, six of the Nederlanders' nine Broadway theaters were dark, and there was a shortage of new musicals. Only one live performance happened this time: a set of concerts by Barry Manilow in mid-1989. That November, the musical comedy Meet Me in St. Louis opened, running for 253 performances.

=== 1990s ===
The concert special Bugs Bunny on Broadway appeared briefly in late 1990, followed by a revival of the musical Fiddler on the Roof. A special appearance by the Moscow Circus then opened at the Gershwin in late 1991. The musical Grand Hotel moved to the Gershwin in February 1992, ending a run of over 1,000 performances there. The Gershwin hosted the 46th Tony Awards in June 1992, and the theater hosted a $1 million launch party that October for Windows for Workgroups. This was followed by concert appearances from Tommy Tune in December 1992, Raffi in April 1993, and Yanni in June 1993. The theater was renovated in mid-1993 prior to its hosting the 47th Tony Awards.

A revival of Lerner and Loewe's Camelot opened in June 1993 and ran for two months. The musical The Red Shoes opened that December, but it was one of Broadway's biggest flops, closing after three days at a loss of $8 million. By the mid-1990s, there was high competition for large Broadway houses. Less than a week after The Red Shoes closed, production company Livent booked a revival of Show Boat for the theater. The theater once again hosted the 48th Tony Awards in 1994. The awards ceremonies subsequently relocated to Radio City Music Hall, as that theater was much larger (allowing the public to attend) and did not require shutting down Broadway productions. Show Boat opened in October 1994 and ran for 949 performances over two years.

Following this, in January 1997, John Gray performed a monologue of his book Men Are from Mars, Women Are from Venus. Livent's revival of the operetta Candide opened that April. and ran for 103 performances. The Roundabout Theatre Company then transferred the musical 1776, its most popular production, to the Gershwin that November, where it ran until June 1998. The New York Shakespeare Festival's production of the musical On the Town opened at the Gershwin in November 1998, but it was unprofitable and closed after 65 performances. The Gershwin also hosted the 53rd Tony Awards in 1999, since Radio City Music Hall was undergoing renovation. Also in 1999, the theater hosted the musicals Peter Pan and Tango Argentino.

=== 2000s to present ===
The dance revue Riverdance on Broadway opened at the Gershwin in March 2000, running for 605 performances through the following August. After Riverdance closed, the Rodgers and Hammerstein musical Oklahoma! was booked at the Gershwin. Additionally, Linda Eder performed at the theater at the end of 2001. Oklahoma! opened in March 2002 and ran for 388 performances for the next year. For Oklahoma!, the first five rows of seats in the orchestra level were removed to make way for a temporary thrust stage. In June 2002, the theater hosted a party celebrating what would have been the 100th birthday of Richard Rodgers, one of the composers of Oklahoma!.

The next production at the Gershwin Theatre was Stephen Schwartz's musical Wicked, which opened in October 2003. David Stone, one of Wicked's producers, was initially reluctant to book the Gershwin because of the theater's reputation for short-lived productions, as well as its size. Despite initial negative reviews, Wicked became so popular that it continued at the Gershwin indefinitely. The theater's large seating capacity also turned out to be suitable for the musical's popularity. As part of a settlement with the United States Department of Justice in 2014, the Nederlanders agreed to improve disabled access at their nine Broadway theaters, including the Gershwin. Wicked was still playing when the theater closed on March 12, 2020, due to the COVID-19 pandemic. The theater reopened on September 14, 2021, with performances of Wicked.

== Notable productions ==
Productions are listed by the year of their first performance.

=== Uris Theatre ===
Notable productions at the theater
Opening year	Name	Refs.
1972	Via Galactica	
1973	Seesaw	
1973	The Desert Song	
1973	Gigi	
1974	Sammy Davis Jr.	
1974	Mott the Hoople	
1974	Enrico Macias and his La Fete Orientale Co.	
1974	Andy Williams with Michel Legrand	
1974	Anthony Newley/Henry Mancini	
1974	Johnny Mathis and the Miracles	
1974	The 5th Dimension	
1974	Raphael	
1975	Frank Sinatra, Ella Fitzgerald, and Count Basie	
1975	Treemonisha	
1975	Fonteyn & Nureyev on Broadway	
1975	Paul Anka	
1975	American Ballet Theatre	
1976	H.M.S. Pinafore/The Pirates of Penzance/The Mikado	
1976	Al Green with Ashford & Simpson	
1976	Porgy and Bess	
1976	Bing Crosby	
1976	Barry Manilow	
1977	Nureyev	
1977	Béjart: Ballet of the Twentieth Century	
1977	The King and I	
1979	Sweeney Todd: The Demon Barber of Fleet Street	
1980	Dance Theatre of Harlem	
1980	The Bat	
1980	Coppelia	
1980	Makarova and Company	
1980	Boston Ballet Company	
1981	The Pirates of Penzance	
1981	My Fair Lady	
1981	Annie	
1983	Show Boat	

=== Gershwin Theatre ===
Notable productions at the theater
Opening year	Name	Refs.
1983	Mame	
1984	Shirley MacLaine on Broadway	
1984	Twyla Tharp Dance on Broadway	
1984	Nureyev and Friends	
1984	Gladys Knight & the Pips & Kashif	
1984	Much Ado About Nothing	
1984	Cyrano de Bergerac	
1985	Patti LaBelle on Broadway	
1985	An Evening with Smokey Robinson	
1985	Singin' in the Rain	
1987	Starlight Express	
1989	Barry Manilow Live on Broadway	
1989	Meet Me in St. Louis	
1990	Bugs Bunny on Broadway	
1990	Fiddler on the Roof	
1991	Moscow Circus	
1992	Grand Hotel	
1992	Tommy Tune Tonite!	
1993	Raffi	
1993	Yanni	
1993	Camelot	
1993	The Red Shoes	
1994	Show Boat	
1997	Men Are from Mars, Women Are from Venus	
1997	Candide	
1997	1776	
1998	On the Town	
1999	Peter Pan	
1999	Tango Argentino	
2000	Riverdance on Broadway	
2001	Linda Eder at the Gershwin	
2002	Oklahoma!	
2003	Wicked	

== Box office records ==
When Starlight Express opened in 1987, it had the highest single-week gross of any show in both the Gershwin Theatre's history and Broadway history. Starlight Express broke this record several times, ultimately grossing $617,022 during the last week of 1987. Fiddler on the Roof set the record for the highest number of tickets sold for a Broadway production in a single week during the last week of 1990. From October 4 to 9, 1994, Show Boat sold $842,636 worth of tickets. This was the highest single-week ticket sale for any Broadway production, in terms of monetary profit, as well as the second-highest in number of tickets sold.

Wicked set the box office record for the Gershwin Theatre multiple times. In 2010, the musical became the first Broadway show to gross over $2 million in a single week. Wicked held the record for the highest single-week gross of any Broadway show from its opening until 2011, when the musical Spider-Man: Turn Off the Dark earned $58 more during a single week (both shows had earned $1.5 million). The theater's current record was set in 2024, when Wicked grossed $5,037,392 over nine performances for the week ending December 29, 2024. This also marked the first time any Broadway show had ever grossed over $5 million in a single week.

== See also ==
- List of Broadway theaters
