= Year One (album) =

Studio album by The Golden Gate
- Released: 1969
- Genre: Rock, sunshine pop
- Label: Audio Fidelity AFSD 6230
- Producer: Billy Carl, Reid Whitelaw

Year One was a 1969 album for the sunshine pop / soft rock group, The Golden Gate. It was in the charts from late 1969 to early 1970. It was re-released in the 2000s and again in the 2020s.

== Background ==
The album Year One was produced by Reid Whitelaw and Billy Carl who also handled the arrangements. It was released on Audio Fidelity AFSD 6230 in 1969.

In an interview for a re-release of Year One, Reid Whitelaw said that he was successful in pitching a concept. He managed to get up-front finance for the project from backers without having to present any demos. The idea was to produce an album with music that was a cross between the Buckinghams, Spiral Starecase, and with some elements of Blood, Sweat and Tears.

According to the Record Collector magazine, published on 25 July 2009, The Golden Gate were a New York / Philadelphia studio equivalent of the late 1960s sunshine pop sound from the West Coast. The album appears to be a highly desired item for Japanese record collectors. It has been referred to as a "holy grail".

It was reported in the 22 November 1969 issue of Record World that Audio Fidelity's new record label was issuing records in both single and LP format. The first album releases were, Are You Serious or Yellow by Kermit Shafer, In the Year One by The Golden Gate, Fran Warren in Nashville by Fran Warren and The Great Expectation by Bob Azzam. With the label's new look, these were the first albums to bear the logo.

== Reception ==
The album was a Pick Hit in the 22 November issue of Record World where it was reviewed. The reader is informed that Billy Carl and Reid Whitelaw were the geniuses behind the operation. The article suggests that Carl and Whitelaw are The Golden Gate, or part of The Golden Gate. With its exciting and pretty songs, the album has the potential to pull in teenage rock fans and would soon get an underground reaction.

It was reported by Record World in the magazine's 20 December issue that the record was breaking out wide, and to date, 20,000 copies had been sold.

The album was a Four Star Pick by Billboard for the week of 22 November.

Kingsley Abbot's review was published in the 25 July 2009 issue of Record Collector. Abbot said that the vocal arrangements were almost swamped with the brass but one could hear the similarities to The Four Seasons on the songs, "Diane, Ridin' High" and "Ready, Willing & Able". He said that the album would appeal to fans of "Coast" vocal harmony and strong strident pop. He also said that the lead singer's voice at times pushes his range, but the album is bright orchestrated pop that grows on you.

The Culture Factory Deluxe Package release of the album made No. 51 on the International Pop Overthrow Best of 2024, Top 75 Proper Albums list.

The album received a three-out-of-five-star rating from AllMusic.

== Airplay ==
For the week of 29 November, Kal Rudman's Money Music feature in Record World reported that the album had been on the playlist for a week at one station, a pick at five stations and due for a test-play at another station over the weekend. Kal Rudman reported that the album was new at six stations and a pick at four others for the week of 6 December. For the week of 13 December, Kal Rudman reported that the album was getting heavy airplay in Charlotte. For the week of 20 December, it was reported by Kal Rudman that the record had broken in Ohio. It was reported elsewhere in the Record World issue that the record had a wide breakout.

== Charts ==
The album Year One debuted at No. 37 in the Record World LP's Coming Up chart for the week of 27 December 1969. It peaked at No. 29 for the week of 17 January 1970.

== Tracks ==
=== Side A ===
1. "High On a Melody", 2:43
2. "Monday After Sunday", 3:37
3. "Diane", 3:42
4. "Never Thought I'd Love You", 3:05
5. "Ridin' High", 2:49

=== Side B ===
1. "In a Colorful Way", 3:14
2. "Lucky", 3:26
3. "Make Your Own Sweet Music", 2:22
4. "Contrary To Mary", 2:36
5. "Ready, Willing, and Able", 2:50

== Later years ==
The album was re-released on Now Sounds CRNOW 12 in 2009. It was re-released again in LP format, on Culture Factory 783 800 in 2024.
