= Chuck Cissel =

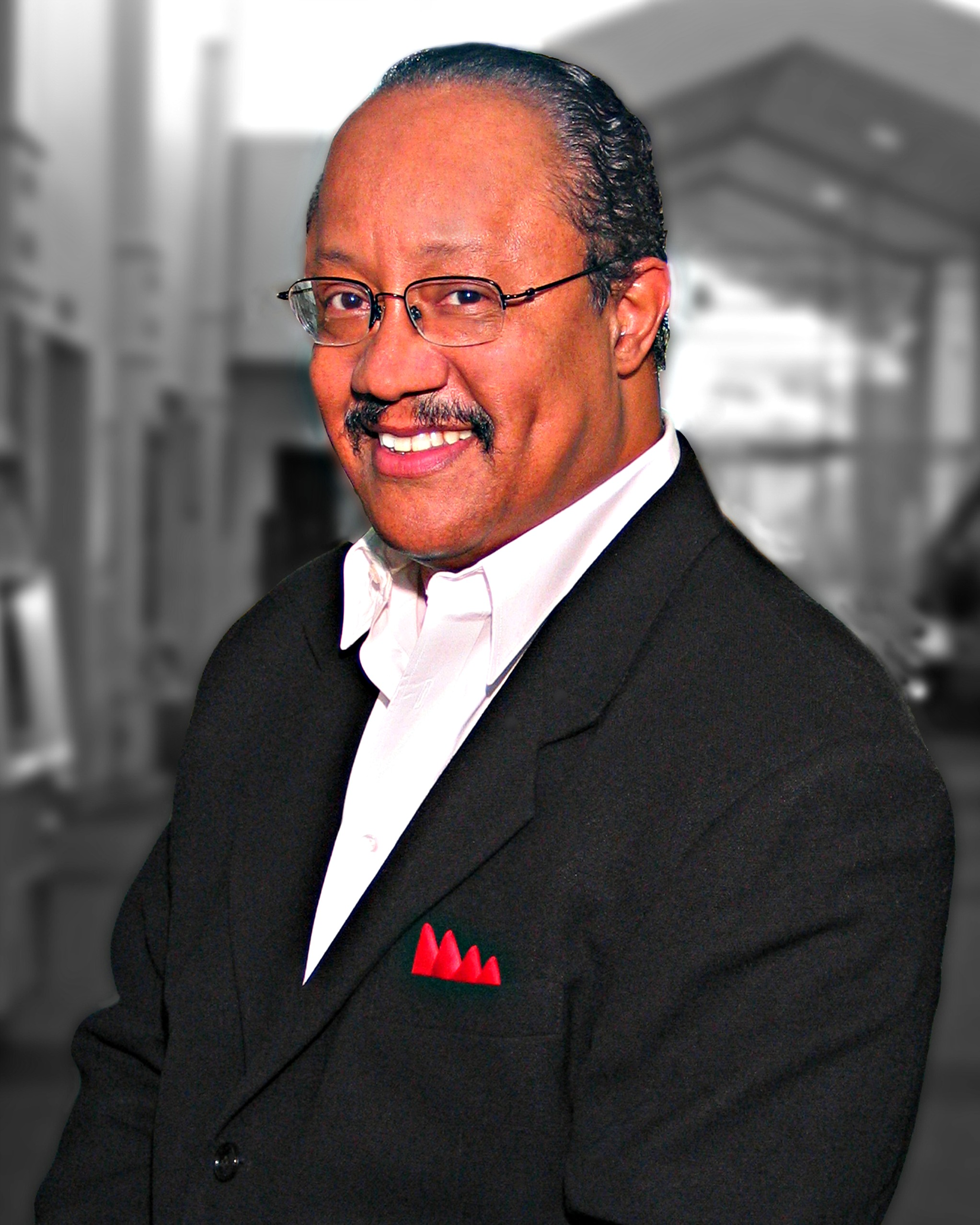
- Photo of Chuck Cissel at the Oklahoma Jazz Hall of Fame, photography Bill Gaddis

Background information
- Born: Charles S. Cissel; October 3, 1948 (age 77)
- Origin: Tulsa, Oklahoma, US
- Genres: R&B, soul, disco, jazz, pop
- Occupations: CEO, artistic director, singer, producer, broadway actor, director, choreographer, writer, composer, teacher
- Years active: 1970–present
- Label: Arista

Charles Cissel (born October 3, 1948) is an American singer, dancer, director, choreographer and producer. He was born in Tulsa, Oklahoma, and graduated from Booker T. Washington High School. He received his Bachelor of Fine Arts from the University of Oklahoma, and was one of the first African Americans to graduate from the university's fine arts school. He was the CEO of the Oklahoma Jazz Hall of Fame (located in Tulsa) from 2000 to 2009 and is now its Artistic Director.

In his early 20s Chuck performed on Broadway in Hello Dolly with Pearl Bailey and Cab Calloway, Purlie, Lost in the Stars, Via Galactica, Don't Bother Me I Can't Cope and as an original member of the Broadway musical A Chorus Line, back when Broadway was starting to open up its doors to African American performers. While in A Chorus Line, Chuck recorded his first record, Swept Away, produced by Michael Bennett, the producer, director, and choreographer of A Chorus Line. Chuck then went on to record solo albums with Arista Records which were called Just for You, featuring the hard-hitting international dance hit Cisselin' Hot and If I Had The Chance. Chuck Cissel is also the brother of former Oklahoma State Senator Maxine Horner, who, along with Oklahoma State Senator Penny Williams, is a co-founder of the Oklahoma Jazz Hall of Fame.

== General references ==
- Lindblad, Elven (January 31, 2024). Tulsa Sounds: Contributions to American Music. pp. 190–191.
