= Extra, Extra (Read All About It) =

Song by Ralph Carter
- A-side: "Extra, Extra (Read All About It)"
- B-side: "Extra, Extra (Read All About It) (Disco Version)"
- Released: 1975
- Length: 5:15
- Label: Mercury 73746
- Composer: R. Whitelaw - N. Bergen
- Producers: Reid Whitelaw and Norman Bergen for Bergen Whitelaw Productions

"Extra, Extra (Read All About It)" was a 1975 single for Ralph Carter. It was a hit for him the following year.

== Background ==
According to the 29 November 1975 issue of Record World, an Anita Wexler mixed release of "Lady Bump" on Atco and the 12-inch version of Ralph Carter's "Extra Extra (Read All About It)" were to be out that week. Carter's disco record was a 33 1/3 rpm version and had a length of 5:15. The 45 rpm version had been edited down to 2:40 for radio airplay.

== Reception ==
The record had a good review in the New Spins section of the 17 January 1976 issue of Record Mirror. With the well-tried simple lyrics, the reviewer said that it was trite, but exciting.

It was reported in the Behind the Breakers section of the 31 January issue of Record Mirror that the fifteen-year-old Ralph Carter was in bounds with his US disco hit. It was already doing well in the UK clubs, and it shouldn't be too long before it gets into the main charts.

According to James Hamilton's Disco Page in the 6 March 1976 issue of Record Mirror, in spite of sustained support, was a surprising Top 50 miss.

== Charts ==
=== United States ===
The record peaked at No. 12 on the US Dance chart plus at No. 59 on the US R&B chart.

=== Canada ===
==== RPM Weekly Top Singles ====
"Extra Extra" debuted at No. 85 in the RPM Weekly Top Singles (51–100) chart for the week of 28 February 1976. Spending one week in the chart, it peaked at No. 25.

=== United Kingdom ===
==== Record Mirror Star Breakers ====
"Extra Extra" was at No. 7 in the Record Mirror Star Breakers chart for the week of 31 January 1976. It was still in the Star Breakers chart, at No. 8 for the week of 14 February.

==== Record Mirror UK Disco Top 20 ====
"Extra Extra" (Read All About It)" debuted at No. 18 in the Record Mirror UK Disco chart for the week of 31 January 1976. It peaked at No. 9 for the week of 7 February.

For the week of 6 March 1976, "Extra Extra (Read All About It)" made its second debut at No. 12 in the Record Mirror UK Disco Top 20 chart. It didn't progress any further.

==== Record Mirror UK Soul Top 20 ====
For the week of 21 February 1976, "Extra Extra" debuted at No. 11 in the Record Mirror UK Soul Top 20 chart. The following week it dropped down to No. 17.

==== Other charts ====
It peaked in the UK at No. 52 position.
