= Galt MacDermot =

Musical artist (1928–2018)

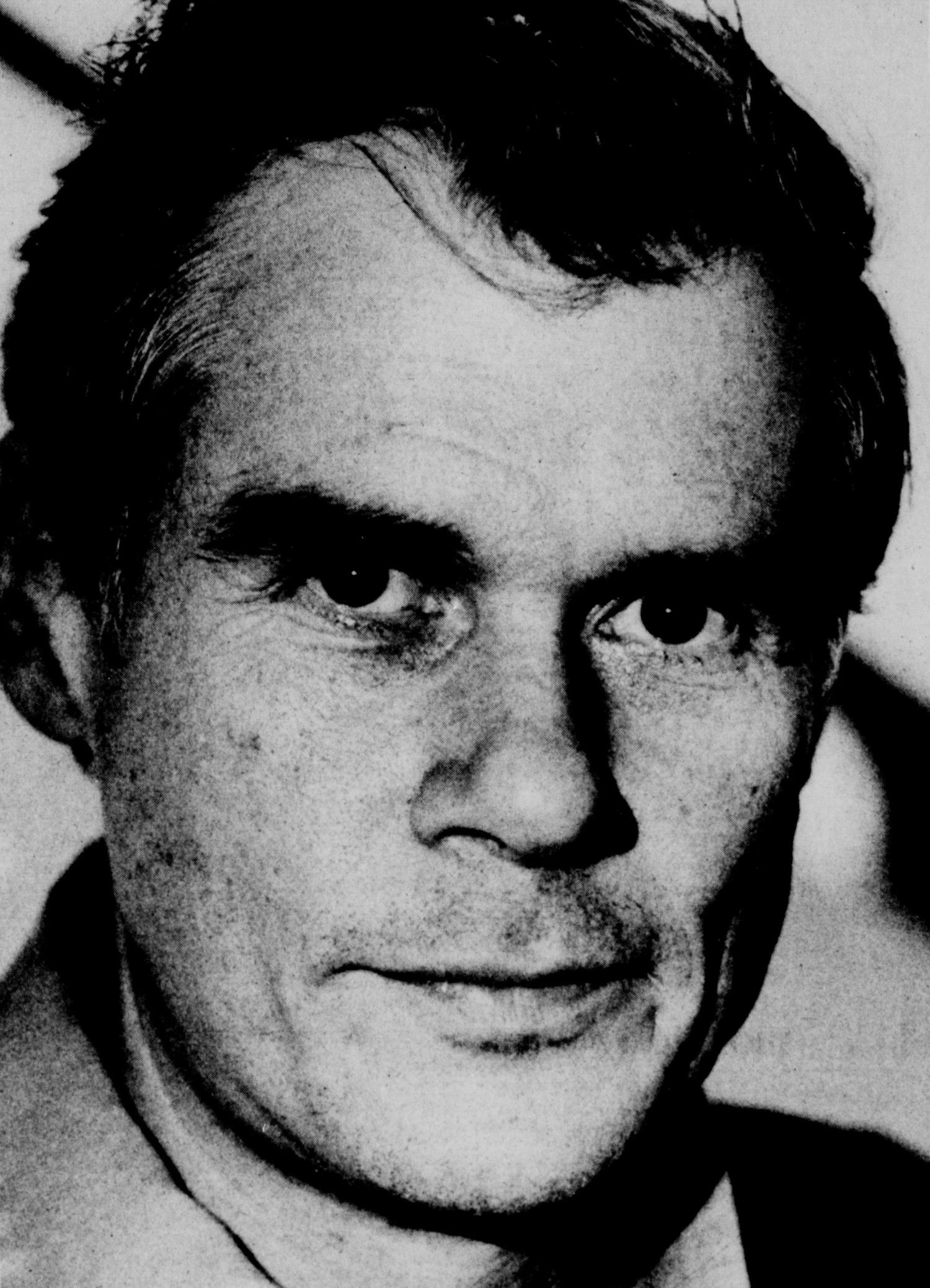
- MacDermot circa 1972
- Born: Arthur Terence Galt MacDermot; December 18, 1928; Montreal, Quebec, Canada
- Died: December 17, 2018 (aged 89); Staten Island, New York, U.S.
- Education: Bishop's University; Cape Town University
- Spouse: Marlene Bruynzeel (m. 1956)
- Children: 5
- Relatives: Terence MacDermot (father)
- Musical career
- Genres: Musical theater; jazz; funk; classical music; film score
- Occupations: Composer; pianist
- Years active: 1954–2018

Arthur Terence Galt MacDermot (December 18, 1928 – December 17, 2018) was a Canadian-American composer, pianist and writer of musical theater. He won a Grammy Award for the song "African Waltz" in 1961. His most successful musicals were Hair (1967; its Broadway cast album also won a Grammy) and Two Gentlemen of Verona (1971). MacDermot also composed film soundtracks, jazz and funk albums, and Western classical music. His music has been sampled in numerous hip-hop songs and albums. He is best known for his work on Hair, which produced three number-one singles in 1969: "Aquarius/Let the Sunshine In", "Good Morning Starshine", and the title song "Hair".

== Biography ==
MacDermot was born in Montreal, the son of Canadian diplomat Terence MacDermot and Elizabeth Savage. He was educated at Upper Canada College and Bishop's University (Sherbrooke, Quebec, Canada). He received a bachelor's degree in music from Cape Town University, South Africa, and made a study of African music his specialty. He studied the piano privately with Neil Chotem. During his time in Cape Town, he met his future wife, Marlene Bruynzeel, a clarinetist of Dutch descent. They married in 1956 and had five children (Vincent, Molly, Yolanda, and twins Sarah and Jolanthe, who died one day apart in 2020). In 1960, he won his first Grammy Award for Cannonball Adderley's recording of his song "African Waltz" (from the album of the same name).

In 1964, MacDermot moved to New York City, where, three years later, he wrote the music for the hit musical Hair, which he later adapted for the 1979 film of the same name. Its Broadway cast album won a Grammy Award in 1969, and the musical generated three number-one singles that year: "Aquarius/Let the Sunshine In", "Good Morning Starshine", and the title song "Hair". His next musicals were Isabel's a Jezebel (1970) and Who the Murderer Was (1970), which featured British progressive rock band Curved Air.

MacDermot had another hit with the musical Two Gentlemen of Verona (1971), which won the Tony Award for Best Musical. For that show, MacDermot was nominated for a Tony for best music and won the Drama Desk Award for Outstanding Music. His later musicals, including Dude and Via Galactica (both 1972) and The Human Comedy (1984), were not successful on Broadway, running 16 performances, 7 performances, and 13 performances respectively.

MacDermot's film soundtracks include Cotton Comes to Harlem, a 1970 blaxploitation film starring Godfrey Cambridge, Raymond St. Jacques, and Redd Foxx, based on Chester Himes's novel of the same name; Rhinoceros (1974) starring Zero Mostel and Gene Wilder, and directed by original Broadway Hair director Tom O'Horgan; and Mistress (1992). He wrote his own orchestrations and arrangements for his theater and film scores.

In 1979, MacDermot formed the New Pulse Jazz Band, which performed and recorded his original music and was one of the first jazz bands to feature synthesizer. The band played as part of the onstage band in the 2009 Broadway revival of Hair. MacDermot's oeuvre also includes ballet scores, chamber music, the Anglican liturgy, orchestral music, poetry, incidental music for plays, band repertory, and opera. In 2009, MacDermot was inducted into the Songwriter's Hall of Fame.

On November 22, 2010, MacDermot was awarded the Lifetime Achievement Award by SOCAN at the 2010 SOCAN Awards in Toronto.

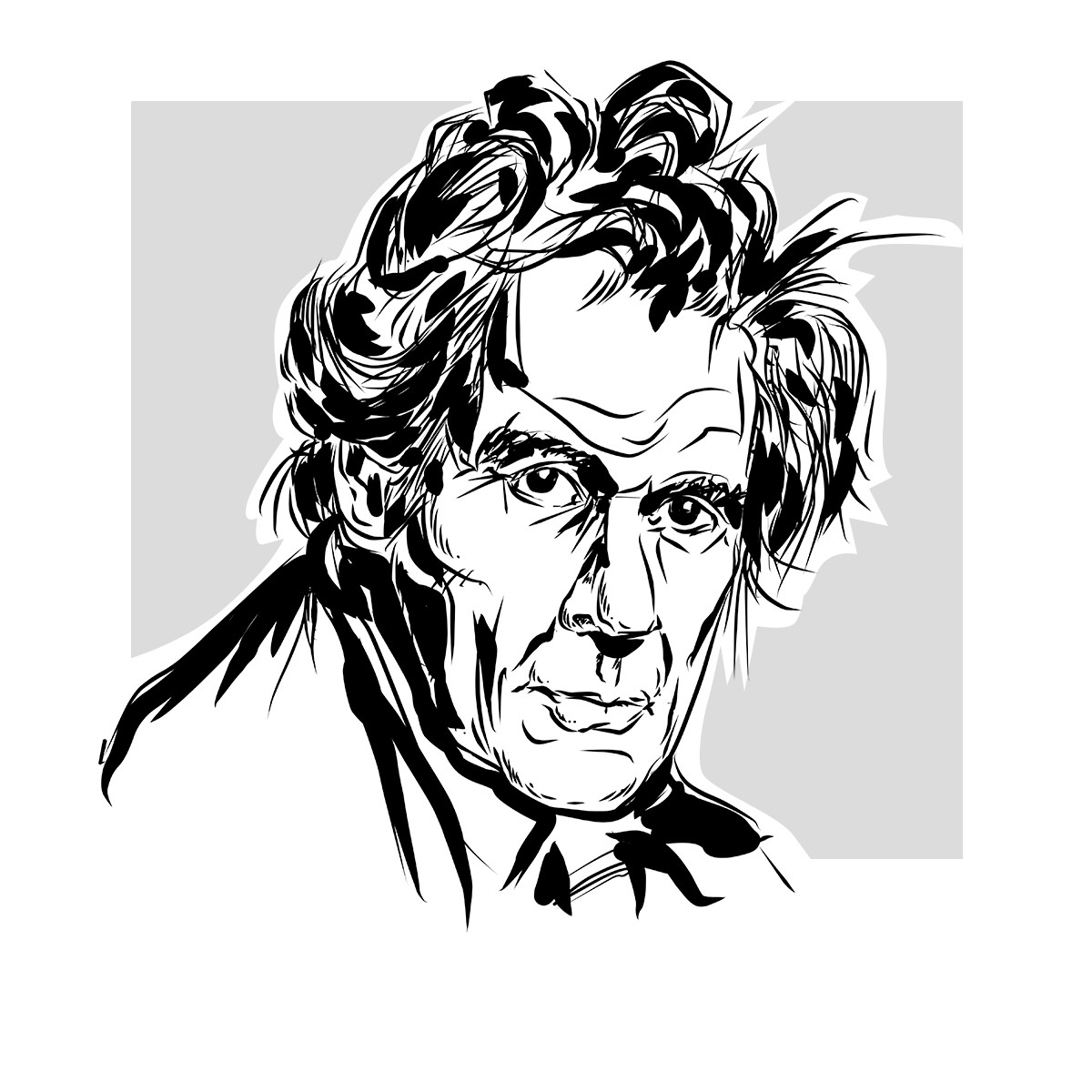
Portrait of Galt MacDermot

== Death ==
MacDermot died at his home in Staten Island, New York on December 17, 2018, one day shy of his 90th birthday.

== Samples and other use ==
MacDermot's music is popular with collectors of jazz and funk. Working with jazz musicians such as Bernard Purdie, Jimmy Lewis and Idris Muhammad, he created pieces that prefigured the funk material of James Brown. In more recent decades, his work became popular with hip hop musicians including Busta Rhymes, who sampled "Space" from MacDermot's 1969 record Woman Is Sweeter for the smash-hit "Woo-Hah!! Got You All in Check", and Run DMC, which sampled the Hair song "Where Do I Go?" in its Grammy Award-winning "Down with the King". Handsome Boy Modeling School ("The Truth"), DJ Vadim, DJ Premier, and Oh No have all sampled the same segment from "Coffee Cold", from Shapes of Rhythm (1966).

Scottish electronica duo Boards of Canada used a loop in their track "Aquarius" (Music Has the Right to Children) which was sampled from MacDermot's song of the same name from the 1979 soundtrack of the film Hair.

As part of his Special Herbs series, rapper MF Doom sampled three MacDermot songs from Woman Is Sweeter: "Cathedral" for his song "Pennyroyal", "Space" for "Cinquefoil", and "Princess Gika" for "Styrax Gum". "Cathedral" is also sampled in Westside Gunn's "Dear Winter Bloody Fiegs" for his 2015 mixtape Hitler Wears Hermes 3. In 2006, rapper and producer Oh No released an album produced completely with MacDermot samples, titled Exodus into Unheard Rhythms.

== Shows ==
- My Fur Lady (1957)
- Hair (1967)
- Isabel's a Jezebel (1970)
- Who the Murderer Was (1970)
- Two Gentlemen of Verona (1971)
- Dude (1973)
- Via Galactica (1973)
- The Human Comedy (1984)
- The Special (1985)
- Time and the Wind (1995)
- The Legend of Joan of Arc (1997)
- Sun (1998)
- Blondie (1998)
- The Corporation (1999)
- Gone Tomoro (2009)

== Discography ==
(excluding cast albums and soundtracks)

- Art Gallery Jazz (1960)
- African Waltz (1960)
- The English Experience (1961)
- Galt MacDermot by Arrangement (1963)
- Shapes of Rhythm (1966)
- Hair Cuts (1969)
- Woman is Sweeter (1969)
- Galt MacDermot's First Natural Hair Band(1970)
- The Nucleus (1971)
- Ghetto Suite (1972)
- Salome Bey Sings Songs From Dude (1972)
- The Highway Life (1973)
- Take This Bread: A Mass in our Time (1973)
- Memphis Dude (1973)
- La Novela (1973)
- The Karl Marx Play (1973)
- The Joker Of Seville (Trinidad Theatre Workshop Original Cast Album)(1974)
- New Pulse Jazz Band (1979)
- O Babylon! (1980)
- Pulse On! (1981)
- New Pulse Jazz Band III (1983)
- Boogie Man (1985)
- Lost Conquest (Conquista Perdida) (1986)
- Purdie as a Picture (1994)
- Reflections of a Radically Right Wing Composer (1992)
- The Thomas Hardy Songs (1997)
- El Niño (1998)
- Up from the Basement Volumes 1 & 2 (2000)
- Corporation (2000)
- Spotted Owl (2000)
- Live In Nashville (2000)
- Foolish Lover (2001)
- Paul Laurence Dunbar in Song (2001)
- Waiting For The Limo (2003)
- In Film (2004)
- Asian Suite (2005)
- Many Faces of Song (2009)
- Sun (2009)
- The Sun Always Shines for the Cool (2014)
- Air & Angels (2017)
