= Ralph Carter =

American actor (born 1961)

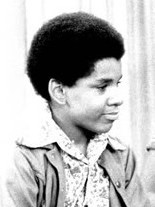
- Carter in 1974
- Born: Ralph David Carter; May 30, 1961 (age 65); New York City, New York, U.S.
- Occupations: Actor; singer
- Years active: 1970–2005
- Known for: Michael Evans – Good Times

Ralph David Carter (born May 30, 1961) is an American actor and singer, best remembered as Michael Evans, the youngest child of Florida and James Evans Sr., on the CBS sitcom Good Times from 1974 to 1979. Before joining Good Times, Carter appeared in the Broadway musical Raisin, based on the Lorraine Hansberry drama A Raisin in the Sun, as was noted in the credits during the first season.

== Early acting career ==
Carter started on Broadway at just nine years old in the musical The Me Nobody Knows. After runs in Tough To Get Help, Dude and Via Galactica, he landed his breakout role as Travis Younger in Raisin, for which he won the 1973 Drama Desk Award for Most Promising Performer as well as the 1974 Theatre World Award and a nomination for the 1974 Tony Award for Best Featured Actor in a Musical.

== Good Times ==
Norman Lear was enjoying huge success in the 1970s, with the hit television series All in the Family, Sanford and Son, and Maude. Lear developed Good Times as a spin-off series for Maude's housekeeper, Florida Evans (portrayed by Esther Rolle) and her husband Henry (John Amos), who was renamed James. Because of Carter's success in Raisin, Lear bought out the remainder of his Broadway contract to cast him as the first original character of Good Times, James and Florida's youngest son, Michael.

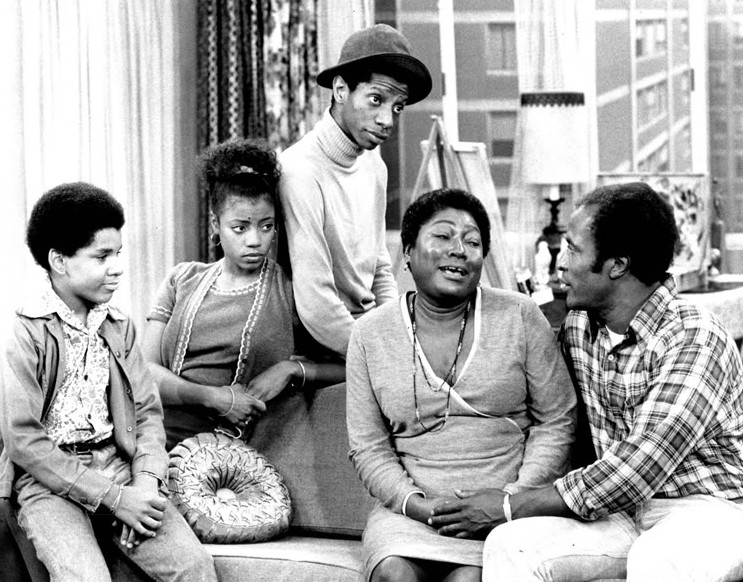
On Good Times (1974), L-R: Ralph Carter, Bernnadette Stanis, Jimmie Walker, Esther Rolle, and John Amos.

== Other work ==
In 1975, Carter recorded an album titled Young and in Love, which was released by Mercury Records, and it included a cover of the Ruby & the Romantics 1964 song "When You're Young and in Love". That song would become the first single from the album. Carter performed the song on the musical variety television show Soul Train. That song, along with the second single "Extra, Extra (Read All About It)", charted at No. 37 and No. 59, respectively, on the US Billboard R&B chart.

In 1980, he appeared in the West Coast premiere of Eden at the Los Angeles Theatre Center.

In 1985, Carter had another single released, "Get it Right", without an accompanying album, though it did not chart.

In 2005, Carter appeared in the cast of "Ain't Supposed to Die a Natural Death" for the Classical Theatre of Harlem Company.
