= Via Galactica =

- 1972 Broadway Playbill
- Music: Galt MacDermot
- Lyrics: Christopher Gore
- Book: Christopher Gore; Judith Ross
- Productions: 1972 Broadway

Via Galactica is a rock musical with a book by Christopher Gore and Judith Ross, lyrics by Gore, and music by Galt MacDermot. Originally titled Up!, the futuristic plot follows social outcasts living on an asteroid in outer space in the year 2972. Among them is Gabriel Finn, a space sanitation man who collects trash in a clamshell-shaped garbage ship called the Helen of Troy.

The first show staged at the brand-new Uris Theatre on Broadway, after fifteen previews, the production opened on November 28, 1972, directed by Peter Hall, produced by George W. George, and choreographed by George Faison. The cast included Raul Julia, Irene Cara, Keene Curtis, Chuck Cissel, Ralph Carter, Melanie Chartoff, and Virginia Vestoff, and marked the Broadway debut of Mark Baker.

The storyline was so incomprehensible that producers inserted a plot synopsis in the Playbill at the last moment, though audiences remained baffled by what unfolded on stage. Pyrotechnic displays, trampolines to portray weightlessness, and other special effects did little to enhance the project. Unable to withstand a universal assault by the critics, the show ran for only seven performances.

One of the first Broadway shows to lose more than $1 million, Via Galactica was MacDermot's second flop of the season. His Dude had closed after 16 performances five weeks earlier.

== Songs ==
=== Act One ===
- "Via Galactica" (Storyteller)
- "We Are One" (Blue People)
- "Helen of Troy" (Gabriel Finn)
- "Oysters" (Hels and April)
- "The Other Side of the Sky" (Hels)
- "Children of the Sun" (Omaha)
- "Different" (April and Company)
- "Take Your Hat Off" (Omaha and Company)
- "Ilmar's Tomb" (Omaha)
- "Shall We Friend?" (Gabriel Finn)
- "The Lady Isn't Looking" (Omaha)
- "Hush" (Gabriel Finn)
- "Cross on Over" (Dr. Isaacs, Omaha and Company)
- "The Gospel of Gabriel Finn" (Gabriel Finn)

=== Act Two ===
- "Terre Haute High" (April)
- "Life Wins" (Omaha)
- "The Worm Germ" (Provo)
- "Isaacs' Equation" (Dr. Isaacs)
- "Dance the Dark Away!" (Storyteller and Company)
- "Four Hundred Girls Ago" (Gabriel Finn)
- "All My Good Mornings" (Omaha)
- "Isaacs' Equation (Reprise)" (Dr. Isaacs)
- "Children of the Sun (Reprise)" (Omaha and Gabriel Finn)
- "New Jerusalem" (Company)
