= Dude (musical) =

- Original Broadway Playbill
- Music: Galt MacDermot
- Lyrics: Gerome Ragni
- Book: Gerome Ragni
- Productions: 1972 Broadway

Dude (The Highway Life) is a rock musical with a book and lyrics by Gerome Ragni and music by Galt MacDermot. It is an allegory about good and evil, the conflict between mankind's creative and destructive urges, the power of love, and the joy to be found in simple pleasures. Dude is an everyman who loses his innocence and fights to regain it.

== Background ==
As soon as the musical Hair opened, Ragni began to work on Dude. MacDermot was busy with Two Gentlemen of Verona but finally began to compose the music. In March 1972, their studio cast album, Salome Bey Sings Songs from Dude, was recorded and released on Kilmarnock Records. The music was more influenced by country music than their previous musical, Hair.

The rehearsal period was plagued with problems: Kevin Geer, the actor who had been cast in the leading role, Dude, was unable to sing the role acceptably and had to be replaced; the script (such as it was) was far from finished; Ragni's requests of the producers were bizarre (for example, 100 butterflies to be released at the beginning of each performance); and the cast threatened to walk out.

== Production ==
In The Broadway Theatre, the musicians were divided, with brass and woodwinds against the wall of one side of the playing area and strings at the other. To accommodate the multimedia presentation, the theatre was gutted and reconverted, at a cost of $800,000, into a circus-like arena in the center (a theatre in the round) filled with fake dirt (real dirt had caused dust; wetting it had caused mud), ramps, runways, catwalks, columns, trapezes, trapdoors, bleachers, and various mechanical and electronic gear. Performers moved freely between the round playing area, representing "Earth", and the audience, seated in flanking "valleys and foothills," with "mountains and mountain tops" beyond and "tree tops and trees" (mezzanine) above. "Heaven and hell" were also represented. The overall effect was of a circus being performed in a primeval forest.

The previews were disastrous, as the audience could not hear with the orchestra scattered around the edges of the theatre. Despite attempts at amplification, the acoustics were still bad in the hollowed out theatre. The director and choreographer resigned, to be replaced by Tom O'Horgan, who had directed Hair and Jesus Christ Superstar. Previews were shut down, and the show went back into rehearsal. Some cast changes were made, and flamboyant visual effects were added. The director and cast confronted Ragni and forced him to rewrite scenes, including most of the second act. Actors wrote some of their own dialogue. The script finally settled down, mostly, by the second to last preview.

After sixteen previews, the Broadway production, directed by Tom O'Horgan, opened on October 9, 1972 at The Broadway Theatre. Universally crucified by the critics (and audiences), who found it incomprehensible, it ran for only 16 performances. The cast included Nell Carter, Rae Allen, Salome Bey, David Lasley and Ralph Carter, who won the Drama Desk Award for Most Promising Performer.

Ralph Carter, an 11-year-old African-American, replaced Kevin Geer, a white 23-year-old, who was originally slated to play "Dude". Due to Carter's age, Nat Morris was cast as "Big Dude" in order to still use the more mature songs. Despite leaving the show, Geer's image, with his back facing the camera was used for the show's poster.

Only five weeks after Dude closed, MacDermot experienced another major failure with the flop musical Via Galactica.

== Synopsis ==
Reba and Harold, actors who believe they have been cast in Richard III, instead find themselves portraying Adam and Eve in a Garden of Eden-like setting, where they are tempted by Zero (the devil) and give birth to son Dude. The forces of Good (#33, Bread, Susie Moon, Mother Earth, and the Shubert Angels) and Evil (Zero, Nero, Esso, Extra, and Sissy) try to gain control of Dude's soul. Dude grows up and succumbs to the temptations of bizarre sexual practices and illicit drugs, leaving his parents guilt-ridden, until Guide #33 (God) assures them that life is merely show business and everything has a happy ending.

== Song list ==
Act I

- Overture
- Theater/Theater
- A-Stage
- The Mountains
- Pears and Peaches
- Eat It
- Wah Wah Wah
- Suzie Moon
- Y.O.U.
- I Love My Boo Boo
- Hum Drum Life
- Who's It?
- Jazz Bridge (Talk to Me About Love)
- Goodbyes
- I'm Small
- You Can Do Nothing About It
- The Handsomest Man
- Electric Prophet
- No-One

Act II

- Who Will Be the Children
- Go Holy Ghost
- A Song to Sing
- A Dawn
- The Days of This Life
- I Never Knew
- Air Male
- A Musical Version Of World War Too/Undo
- The Earth
- My Darling I Love You March
- So Long Dude
- Dude All Dude
- Peace Peace
- Jesus Hi
- Baby Breath
- Sweet Dreams
