= Ralph Alswang =

American designer

Ralph Alswang (April 12, 1916 – February 1979) was an American theatre and film director, designer, and producer. He designed scenery, lighting, and costumes for nearly 100 Broadway productions. He also designed venues such as the George Gershwin Theatre.

== Biography ==
Alswang was born on April 12, 1916, in Chicago, the son of Hyman and Florence Alswang. He studied theatre at the Goodman Theatre, the Art Institute of Chicago, and under Robert Edmond Jones. He was married to Beatrice (Betty) Alswang, an interior designer. He died in February 1979. He is survived by his three children, Hope Alswang, Frances Alswang, and Ralph Alswang.

== Theatrical career ==
From 1942 to 1977, Alswang produced designs for nearly 100 Broadway productions, more than 70 of which were original productions. Alswang's first major design work was the scenery for the 1942 production of Comes the Revelation at Jolson's 59th Street Theatre. In 1946, Alswang designed the scenery for the Broadway revival of Lysistrata. In addition to scenery, Alswang also designed lighting and costumes. He was the lighting designer for the original Broadway productions of A Raisin in the Sun and Beyond the Fringe, each running for more than 500 performances. Alswang did the scenic and lighting design for Dore Schary's 1958 Sunrise at Campobello, which ran for 556 performances. In some cases, such as the short-lived 1964 production of Fair Game For Lovers, Alswang designed all three elements for the same production.

In March 1964, co-produced and directed a production titled Is There Intelligent Life on Earth?. The production integrated live action with motion pictures, a process known as "Living Screen" designed by Alswang. His last Broadway design was the 1977 production of Piaf... A Remembrance.

== Architectural design ==
In the early 1970s, Alswang designed the Uris Theatre in New York City, now the Gershwin Theatre. The following year, Alswang designed the New Orleans Civic Center Theatre and the Pine Knob Pavilion. Alswang also designed several houses in Westport, including the home of Paul Newman.

== Film ==
Along with Robert J. Flaherty and Robert Snyder, Alswang co-produced The Titan: Story of Michelangelo (1950). The film won the 1951 Academy Award for Best Documentary Feature.
