= Hope Alswang =

American museum director (1947–2024)

Hope Alswang (May 4, 1947 – June 11, 2024) was an American museum director. She was the executive director of the New Jersey Historical Society, the Shelburne Museum, the Rhode Island School of Design Museum, and the Norton Museum of Art.

== Life and career ==
Alswang was born May 4, 1947 in Manhattan to Betty (Taylor) Alswang, an interior designer and Ralph Alswang, a set designer. She earned a bachelor's degree in American history at Goddard College in 1967, and pursued certification in museum studies as a Webb Fellow at the University of Vermont. By 1975, she was hired as a curatorial assistant in the decorative arts department at the Brooklyn Museum. Alswang died of pancreatic cancer on June 11, 2024, at the age of 77.
