= The Softones =

American soul musical group

Background information
- Origin: Baltimore, United States
- Genre: Soul
- Years active: 1970-present
- Label: Avco
- Members: Steve Jackson: Marvin Brown Jr; John Johnson; Micheal Muse
- Past members: Marvin Brown Sr: Byron Summerville; Elton Lynch

The Softones, known for their hits "Carla My Love", "My Dream" and "Hey There Lonely Girl", are an R&B singing group from Baltimore Md. The group began with Marvin Brown and family members in the late 1960s. In the early 1970s, Marvin Brown recruited Elton Lynch, Byron Summerville and Steven Jackson and developed the harmonious sound they became known for.

Lead singer Marvin Brown's falsetto tenor propelled them to become internationally revered, touring the US, Europe, the Caribbean islands and Japan extensively

Their 1st single, "Any Street" was released on the Their Way records in 1972.

They subsequently signed with Avco Embassy records and released their debut album, The Softones in 1973, which included the singles "My Dream" and "I'm Gonna Prove It". They then signed with H&L Records, recording songs written and produced by the music team Hugo and Luigi including a rendition of "Can't Help Falling in Love", which was previously recorded by Elvis Presley and the hit, "That Old Black Magic", which became a disco hit.

In November 2024, The Softones were honored by the city of Baltimore Md, naming a street in the neighborhood where the group originally started singing "The Softones Way ". They are still actively performing in 2026 with original group member Steven Jackson leading the group that includes John Johnson, Micheal Muse and John Marvin Brown Jr

Byron Summerville died in 2012 at the age of 60. J. Marvin Brown died in July 2020 at the age of 66. Elton Lynch died in November 2022 at the age of 70.

Softones Discography

Studio Albums

• The Softones (1973)

• Black Magic (1977)

• Brand New Day (1978)

• Together (1979)

Carla My Love (2012)

Live Albums & Compilations

• Feeling Live! / Feeling (Live from Japan) (1977)

• The Very Best Of The Softones (1996 / 1999)

• Together (Expanded Edition) (2012)

• The Softones Live

Notable Singles & EPs

• I'm Gonna Prove It

• What Is Life u

• Can't Help Falling in Love (1973)

• That Old Black Magic

• Why, Why, Baby (1975)

• Carla My Love (1979)

• Any Street111

• My Dream

• Hey There Lonely Girl
