= List of Steppenwolf members =

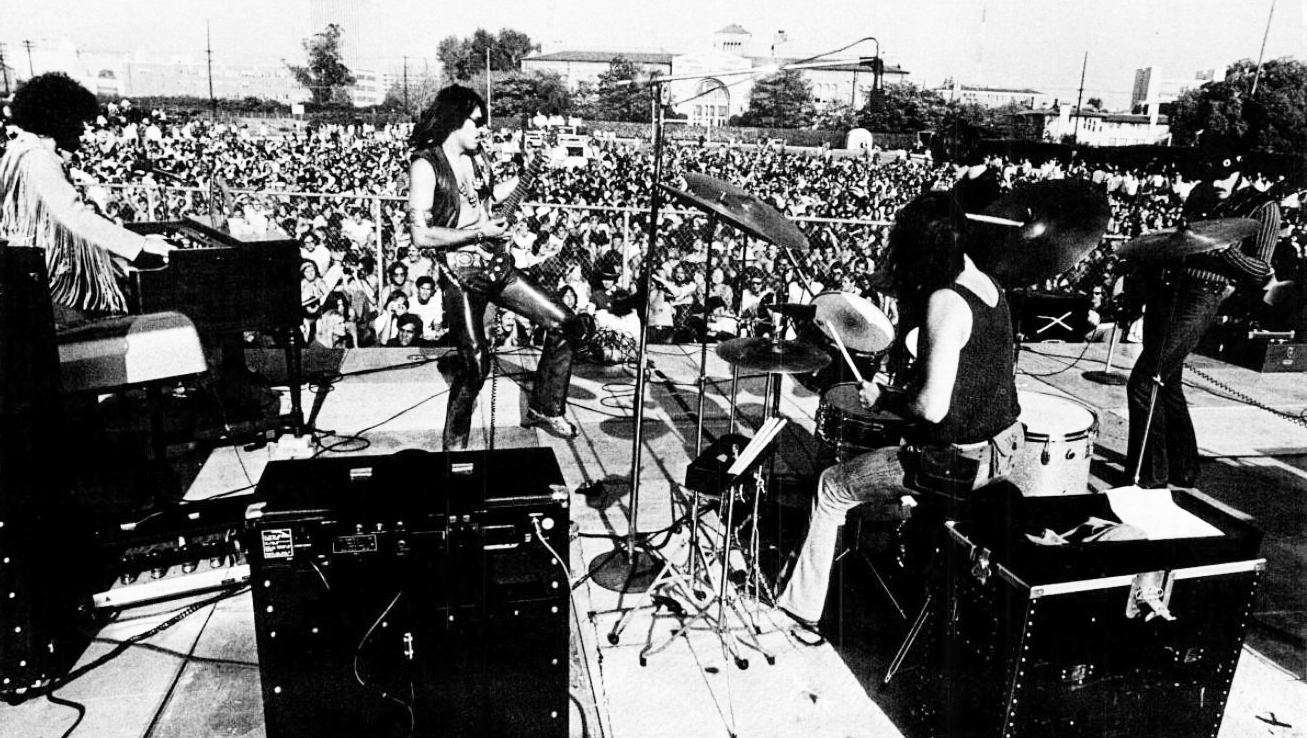
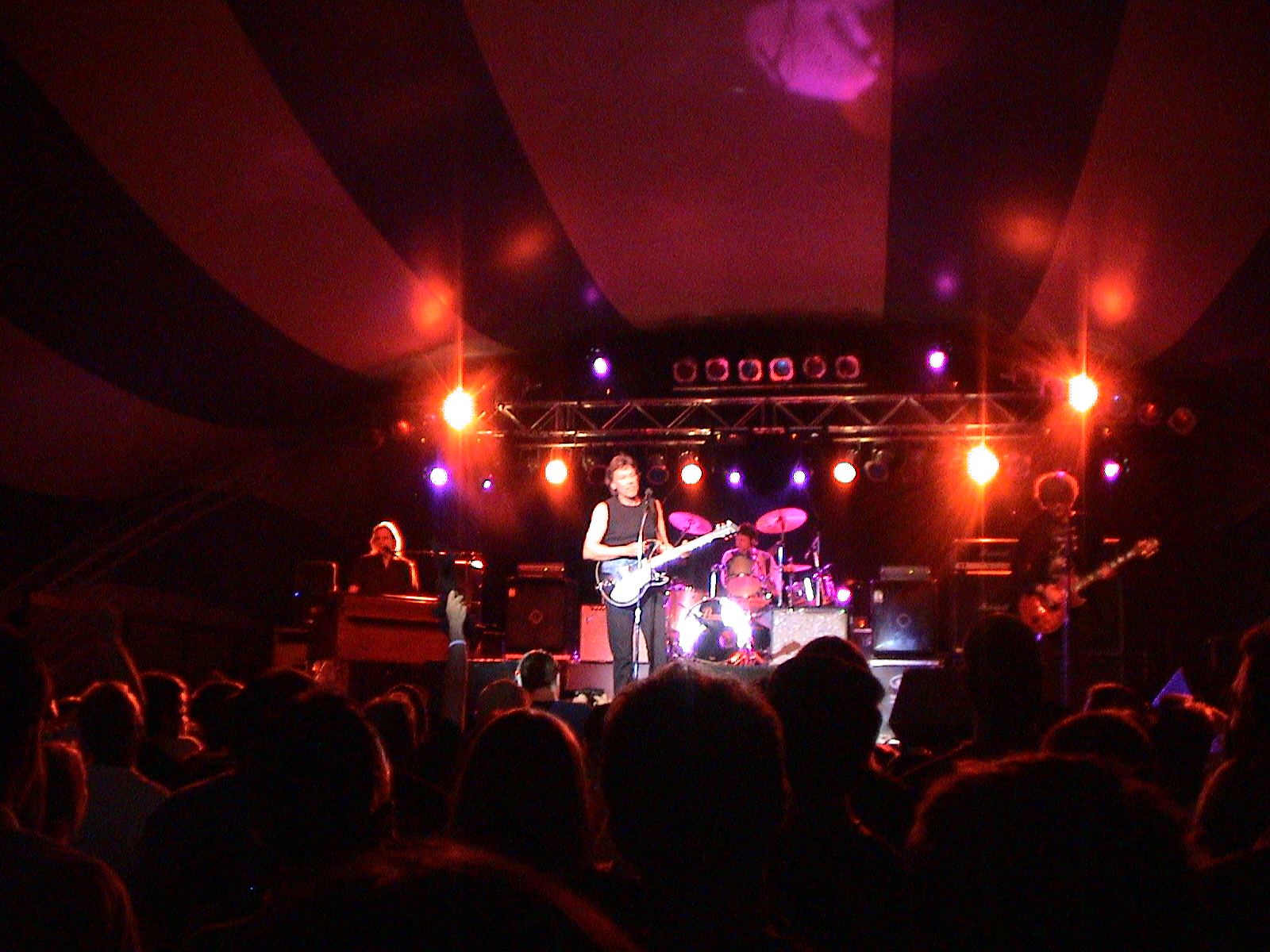
Two lineups of Steppenwolf performing live in 1970 (top) and 2006 (bottom).

Steppenwolf was a Canadian-American hard rock band from Los Angeles, California. Formed in 1967, the group originally consisted of lead vocalist and rhythm guitarist John Kay, lead guitarist Michael Monarch, bassist Nick St. Nicholas, drummer Jerry Edmonton and keyboardist Goldy McJohn. The band's final lineup featured Kay, keyboardist Michael Wilk (since 1982, and bassist between 1984 and 2009), bassist Gary Link (from 1982 to 1984, and since 2009), drummer Ron Hurst (since 1984) and lead guitarist Danny Johnson (since 1996).

== History ==
=== 1967–1976 ===
Steppenwolf evolved from the Sparrows in late 1967 and originally included John Kay, Michael Monarch, Rushton Moreve, Jerry Edmonton and Goldy McJohn. After the release of two studio albums, Moreve was fired in early 1969 for failure to appear at several performances, with former Sparrows bassist Nick St. Nicholas taking his place. Monarch left the group in August, with Larry Byrom taking his place in time for the recording of Monster. St. Nicholas ceased working with Steppenwolf in April 1970, and was formally excluded from the band the following year. He was replaced by George Biondo. Byrom was replaced by Kent Henry for the 1971 release For Ladies Only. In February 1972, Steppenwolf disbanded; Kay, Henry and Biondo continued working together, while Edmonton and McJohn formed a group called Manbeast.

In early 1974 Steppenwolf reformed, with guitarist Bobby Cochran joining returning members Kay, Biondo, Edmonton and McJohn. Kay fired McJohn the following February, with Andy Chapin taking his place. The new keyboardist declined to tour with the group, however, and was replaced by Wayne Cook. The band released three studio albums during its second tenure, before disbanding in late 1976. Following the group's second breakup, former members St. Nicholas and McJohn formed a band dubbed "New Steppenwolf", it was licensed and legit until 1980 at which time the licensing agreement wasn't complied with prompting Kay and Edmonton (who owned the rights to use the name) to take legal action.

=== 1980–2018 ===
Kay reformed the band as "John Kay and Steppenwolf" in January 1980, rebuilding the group with brothers Michael (lead guitar) and Steve Palmer (drums), bassist Kurtis Teel and keyboardist Danny Ironstone (Teel and Ironstone were soon replaced by Chad Peery and Brett Tuggle, respectively). Peery and Tuggle performed on the 1981 live album Live in London, but were replaced for the recording of the following year's studio return Wolftracks by Welton Gite and Michael Wilk, respectively. Gary Link took over on bass for 1984's Paradox but had left alongside the Palmer brothers by the end of the year, with Rocket Ritchotte (lead guitar) and Ron Hurst (drums) joining shortly after, and keyboardist Michael Wilk took the bass. The band released Rock & Roll Rebels in 1987, which was the group's first to feature the four-piece lineup.

Ritchotte left Steppenwolf in 1989 to tour with the David Lee Roth Band, returning the following year and remaining until late 1993. During his time away from the band, he was replaced briefly by Les Dudek, and later by Steve Fister. Following his departure, Fister returned to Steppenwolf for another three-year run. In 1996, Danny Johnson joined Steppenwolf in place of the departed Fister. Bassist Gary Link rejoined the band in 2009. In October 2018, at the end of the band's 50th anniversary tour, Kay announced that the group had officially retired.

== Members ==
Image	Name	Years active	Instruments	Release contributions
	John Kay	1967–1972; 1974–1976; 1980–2018	lead vocals; rhythm and slide guitars; harmonica; keyboards (2007–2011); bass (2007–2009)	all Steppenwolf releases
	Jerry Edmonton	1967–1972; 1974–1976 (died 1993)	drums; percussion; backing and occasional lead vocals	all Steppenwolf releases from Steppenwolf (1968) to Skullduggery (1976)
	Goldy McJohn	1967–1972; 1974–1975 (died 2017)	keyboards; backing vocals	all Steppenwolf releases from Steppenwolf (1968) to Slow Flux (1974)
	Michael Monarch	1967–1969	lead guitar; backing vocals	Steppenwolf (1968); The Second (1968); At Your Birthday Party (1969)
	Rushton Moreve	1967–1968; 1978 (died 1981)	bass; backing vocals	Steppenwolf (1968); The Second (1968)
	Nick St. Nicholas	1968–1970	bass; backing and occasional lead vocals	At Your Birthday Party (1969); Early Steppenwolf (1969); Monster (1969); Live (1970)
	Larry Byrom	1969–1971	lead guitar; backing vocals	Monster (1969); Live (1970); Steppenwolf 7 (1970)
	George Biondo	1970–1972; 1974–1976	bass; backing and occasional lead vocals	all Steppenwolf releases from Steppenwolf 7 (1970) to Skullduggery (1976); Wolftracks (1982) – guest backing vocals
	Kent Henry	1971–1972 (died 2009)	lead guitar	For Ladies Only (1971)
	Bobby Cochran	1974–1976	lead guitar; backing vocals	Slow Flux (1974); Hour of the Wolf (1975); Skullduggery (1976)
	Andy Chapin	1975 (died 1985)	keyboards, backing vocals	Hour of the Wolf (1975)
	Wayne Cook	1975–1976	keyboards, backing vocals	Skullduggery (1976)
	Michael Palmer	1980–1985	lead guitar; backing vocals	Live in London (1981); Wolftracks (1982); Paradox (1984)
	Steve Palmer	1980–1985	drums; percussion; backing vocals	Live in London (1981); Wolftracks (1982); Paradox (1984)
	Danny Ironstone	1980	keyboards; backing vocals	none
	Kurtis Teel	1980	bass; backing vocals	none
	Chad Peery	1980–1981	bass	Live in London (1981)
	Brett Tuggle	1980–1982 (died 2022)	keyboards; backing vocals	Live in London (1981); Wolftracks (1982) – backing vocals only; Paradox (1984) – backing vocals only
	Welton Gite	1981–1982	bass	Wolftracks (1982)
	Michael Wilk	1982–2007; 2011–2018	keyboards; programming; piano; backing vocals; bass (1984–2007)	all Steppenwolf releases from Wolftracks (1982) onwards
	Gary Link	1982–1984; 2009–2018	bass; backing vocals	Paradox (1984)
	Ron Hurst	1984–2018	drums; backing vocals	all Steppenwolf releases from Rock & Roll Rebels (1987) onwards
	Rocket Ritchotte	1985–1989; 1990–1993	lead guitar; backing vocals	Rock & Roll Rebels (1987); Rise & Shine (1990); Live at 25 (1995); Feed the Fire (1996)
	Les Dudek	1989	lead guitar; backing vocals	none
	Steve Fister	1989–1990; 1993–1996	lead guitar; backing vocals	none
	Danny Johnson	1996–2018	lead guitar; mandolin; backing vocals	Feed the Fire (1996); Live in Louisville (2000)

== Lineups ==
Period	Members	Releases
Late 1967 – early 1969	John Kay – lead vocals, rhythm guitar, harmonica; Michael Monarch – lead guitar, backing vocals; Rushton Moreve – bass, backing vocals; Jerry Edmonton – drums, percussion, backing and occasional lead vocals; Goldy McJohn – keyboards, piano, backing vocals	Early Steppenwolf (1969); Steppenwolf (1968); The Second (1968)
Early – August 1969	John Kay – lead vocals, rhythm guitar, harmonica; Michael Monarch – lead guitar, backing vocals; Nick St. Nicholas – bass, backing and occasional lead vocals; Jerry Edmonton – drums, percussion, backing vocals occasional lead vocals; Goldy McJohn – keyboards, piano, backing vocals	At Your Birthday Party (1969)
September 1969 – April 1970	John Kay – lead vocals, rhythm guitar, harmonica; Larry Byrom – lead guitar, backing vocals; Nick St. Nicholas – bass, backing and lead vocals; Jerry Edmonton – drums, percussion, backing and occasional lead vocals; Goldy McJohn – keyboards, piano, backing vocals	Monster (1969); Steppenwolf Live (1970)
May 1970 – early 1971	John Kay – lead vocals, rhythm guitar, harmonica; Larry Byrom – lead guitar, backing vocals; George Biondo – bass, backing and occasional lead vocals; Jerry Edmonton – drums, percussion, backing vocals; Goldy McJohn – keyboards, piano, backing vocals	Steppenwolf 7 (1970)
Early 1971 – February 1972	John Kay – lead vocals, rhythm guitar, harmonica; Kent Henry – lead guitar; George Biondo – bass, occasional lead vocals; Jerry Edmonton – drums, percussion, backing vocals; Goldy McJohn – keyboards, piano, backing vocals	For Ladies Only (1971)
Band inactive February 1972 – early 1974
Early 1974 – February 1975	John Kay – lead vocals, rhythm guitar, harmonica; Bobby Cochran – lead guitar, backing vocals; George Biondo – bass, backing vocals; Jerry Edmonton – drums, percussion, backing vocals; Goldy McJohn – keyboards, piano, backing vocals	Slow Flux (1974)
March – August 1975	John Kay – lead vocals, rhythm guitar, harmonica; Bobby Cochran – lead guitar, backing vocals; George Biondo – bass, backing vocals; Jerry Edmonton – drums, percussion, backing vocals; Andy Chapin – keyboards	Hour of the Wolf (1975)
August 1975 – late 1976	John Kay – lead vocals, rhythm guitar, harmonica; Bobby Cochran – lead guitar, backing vocals; George Biondo – bass, backing vocals; Jerry Edmonton – drums, percussion, backing vocals; Wayne Cook – keyboards	Skullduggery (1976)
Band inactive late 1976 – early 1980
Early 1980	John Kay – lead vocals, rhythm guitar, harmonica; Michael Palmer – lead guitar, backing vocals; Kurtis Teel – bass, backing vocals; Steve Palmer – drums, percussion, backing vocals; Danny Ironstone – keyboards, piano, backing vocals	none
1980–1981	John Kay – lead vocals, rhythm guitar, harmonica; Michael Palmer – lead guitar, backing vocals; Chad Peery – bass, backing vocals; Steve Palmer – drums, percussion, backing vocals; Brett Tuggle – keyboards, piano, backing vocals	Live in London (1981)
1981–1982	John Kay – lead vocals, rhythm guitar, harmonica; Michael Palmer – lead guitar, backing vocals; Welton Gite – bass; Steve Palmer – drums, percussion, backing vocals; Michael Wilk – keyboards, piano, backing vocals	Wolftracks (1982)
1982–1984	John Kay – lead vocals, rhythm guitar, harmonica; Michael Palmer – lead guitar, backing vocals; Gary Link – bass, backing vocals; Steve Palmer – drums, percussion, backing vocals; Michael Wilk – keyboards, piano, backing vocals	Paradox (1984)
1985–1989	John Kay – lead vocals, rhythm guitar, harmonica; Rocket Ritchotte – lead guitar, backing vocals; Michael Wilk – bass, keyboards, piano, backing vocals; Ron Hurst – drums, percussion, backing vocals	Rock & Roll Rebels (1987); Rise & Shine (1990)
1989	John Kay – lead vocals, rhythm guitar, harmonica; Les Dudek – lead guitar; Michael Wilk – bass, keyboards, piano, backing vocals; Ron Hurst – drums, percussion, backing vocals	none
1989–1990	John Kay – lead vocals, rhythm guitar, harmonica; Steve Fister – lead guitar; Michael Wilk – bass, keyboards, piano, backing vocals; Ron Hurst – drums, percussion, backing vocals	none
1990–1993	John Kay – lead vocals, rhythm guitar, harmonica; Rocket Ritchotte – lead guitar, backing vocals; Michael Wilk – bass, keyboards, piano, backing vocals; Ron Hurst – drums, percussion, backing vocals	Live at 25 (1995)
1993–1996	John Kay – lead vocals, rhythm guitar, harmonica; Steve Fister – lead guitar; Michael Wilk – bass, keyboards, piano, backing vocals; Ron Hurst – drums, percussion, backing vocals	none
1996–2009	John Kay – lead vocals, rhythm guitar, harmonica; Danny Johnson – lead guitar, mandolin, backing vocals; Michael Wilk – bass, keyboards, piano, backing vocals; Ron Hurst – drums, percussion, backing vocals	Feed the Fire (1996); Live in Louisville (2004)
2009 – October 2018	John Kay – lead vocals, rhythm guitar, harmonica; Danny Johnson – lead guitar, mandolin, backing vocals; Gary Link – bass, backing vocals; Ron Hurst – drums, percussion, backing vocals; Michael Wilk – keyboards, piano, backing vocals	none
