= The Collection (Steppenwolf album) =

Greatest hits album by Steppenwolf
- Released: 8 July 2003
- Recorded: 1967–1987
- Genre: Hard rock, psychedelic rock, blues rock
- Length: 79:46
- Label: Spectrum Music

Steppenwolf compilations chronology
All Time Greatest Hits (1999)	The Collection (2003)	Steppenwolf Gold (2005)

Professional ratings
Review scores
Source	Rating
AllMusic	3/5 stars

The Collection is a compilation album released in 2003 by the Canadian-American rock band Steppenwolf.

== Track listing ==
All songs written by John Kay, except where noted.

No.	Title	Writer(s)	Original album	Length
1.	"Born to Be Wild"	Mars Bonfire	Steppenwolf	3:29
2.	"Rock Me"	Kay, Dave Grusin, Goldy McJohn	At Your Birthday Party	3:32
3.	"Magic Carpet Ride"	Kay, Rushton Moreve	The Second	4:26
4.	"Faster Than the Speed of Life"	Bonfire	The Second	3:13
5.	"Hey Lawdy Mama"	Larry Byrom, Jerry Edmonton, Kay	Steppenwolf Live	2:56
6.	"Tenderness"	Bonfire	For Ladies Only	4:55
7.	"Screaming Night Hog"		Gold: Their Great Hits	3:15
8.	"Earschplittenloudenboomer"	Byrom	Steppenwolf 7	5:00
9.	"I'm Movin' On" (performed by John Kay)	Hank Snow	Forgotten Songs and Unsung Heroes	3:09
10.	"Children of the Night"		Slow Flux	4:43
11.	"Twisted"		Steppenwolf Live	5:06
12.	"Rock 'n' Roll Rebels" (performed by John Kay & Steppenwolf)	Kay, Rocket Ritchotte, Michael Wilk	Rock & Roll Rebels	3:51
13.	"The Ostrich"		Steppenwolf	5:44
14.	"Straight Shootin' Woman"	Edmonton	Slow Flux	4:03
15.	"It's Never Too Late"	Kay, Nick St. Nicholas	At Your Birthday Party	3:01
16.	"Live Your Life" (performed by John Kay & Company)		The Lost Heritage Tapes	4:13
17.	"Hippo Stomp"	Byrom, Kay	Steppenwolf 7	5:38
18.	"Good Morning Little Schoolgirl" (performed by John Kay & The Sparrow)	Sonny Boy Williamson	John Kay & The Sparrow	3:42
19.	"The Pusher"	Hoyt Axton	Steppenwolf	5:50
Total length:				79:46

== Personnel ==
- John Kay: guitars, harmonica, lead vocals
- Rushton Moreve: bass guitar, backing vocals (tracks 1, 3–4, 13, 18–19)
- Michael Monarch: guitars, backing vocals (tracks 1–4, 13, 15, 18–19)
- Goldy McJohn: Hammond organ, piano, electric piano, keyboards (tracks 1–8, 10–11, 13–15, 17–19)
- Jerry Edmonton: drums, percussion, backing vocals (tracks 1–8, 10–11, 13–15, 17–19)
- Nick St. Nicholas: bass guitar (tracks 2, 5, 11, 15)
- Larry Byrom: guitars, backing vocals (tracks 5, 7–8, 11, 17)
- George Biondo: bass guitar, backing vocals (tracks 6–10, 14, 17)
- Kent Henry: guitars (tracks 6, 9)
- Hugh O'Sullivan: keyboards (track 9)
- Penti Glan: drums (track 9)
- Bobby Cochran: guitars (tracks 10, 14)
- Rocket Ritchotte: guitars, backing vocals (track 12)
- Michael Wilk: bass guitar, keyboards (track 12)
- Ron Hurst: drums (track 12)
- Michael Palmer: guitars (track 16)
- Wayne Cook: keyboards (track 16)
- Kenny Blanchet: bass guitar (track 16)
- Steven Palmer: drums (track 16)
