= Steppenwolf discography =

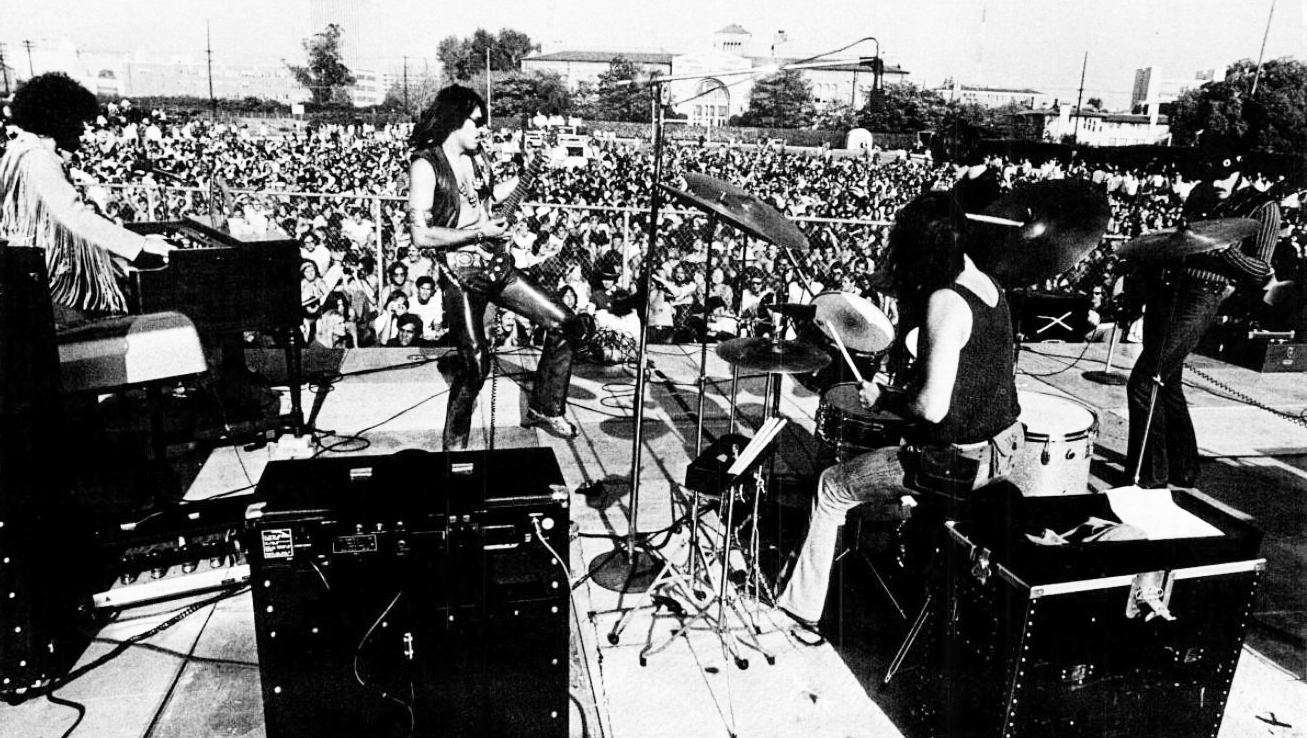
- Trade ad for ABC / Dunhill featuring Steppenwolf. 1970
- Studio albums: 13
- Live albums: 5
- Compilation albums: 9
- Singles: 21
- Video albums: 4

The discography of Steppenwolf, a Canadian-American hard rock band, consists of 13 studio albums, 14 compilation albums, 5 live albums, 41 singles, and three music videos. The band was formed in 1967 after some members of The Sparrows split. Group members included John Kay, Michael Monarch, Goldy McJohn, Rushton Moreve and Jerry Edmonton. Their first album, Steppenwolf, was released in 1968, which sold well and reached 6 on Billboard. That same year, Steppenwolf covered "The Pusher" (previously released by Hoyt Axton). The song was later used in Easy Rider. The album's most successful single was "Born to Be Wild", which reached No. 2 on the Billboard. At the time of the release of second album, The Second, the band's bassist Rushton Moreve had a dispute with band leader John Kay, and was eventually replaced with Nick St. Nicholas. The album's single was "Magic Carpet Ride" which reached number 3 on Billboard.

The band's third album, At Your Birthday Party, reached number 7 on the Billboard. The album's single "Rock Me" reached number 10 on Billboard; no single went that high in the United States after that, although they continued to do well on the Canadian singles chart. Steppenwolf released three more albums by 1972 that had no commercial success and eventually led to the band's dissolution. The band re-formed in 1974 with a new lineup, including John Kay, Jerry Edmonton, Goldy McJohn, George Biondo, and Bobby Cochran. Steppenwolf released three albums during this period, the most successful being "Slow Flux". After three albums, Steppenwolf was dissolved in 1976. The group was re-formed in 1980 and broke up for the last time in 2018. Steppenwolf's newest studio album was Rise & Shine, released in 1990.

== Albums ==
=== Studio albums ===
Title	Details	Peak chart positions					Certifications (sales threshold)
Title	Details	US	AUS	CAN	NOR	UK	Certifications (sales threshold)
Steppenwolf	Release date: January 1968; Label: Dunhill Records; Formats: CD, Vinyl record, cassette, 8-track	6	—N/a	1	—	59	US: Gold
The Second	Release date: October 1968; Label: Dunhill Records; Formats: CD, Vinyl record, cassette, 8-track	3	—N/a	2	—	—	US: Gold
At Your Birthday Party	Release date: March 1969; Label: Dunhill Records; Formats: CD, Vinyl record, cassette, 8-track	7	—N/a	12	—	—	
Monster	Release date: November 1969; Label: Dunhill Records; Formats: CD, Vinyl record, cassette, 8-track	17	—	11	8	43	US: Gold
Steppenwolf 7	Release date: November 1970; Label: Dunhill Records; Formats: CD, Vinyl record, cassette, 8-track	19	26	14	10	—	US: Gold
For Ladies Only	Release date: November 1971; Label: Dunhill Records; Formats: CD, Vinyl record, cassette, 8-track	54	—	—	13	—	
Slow Flux	Release date: August 1974; Label: Mums Records; Formats: CD, Vinyl record, cassette, 8-track	47	—	—	—	—	
Hour of the Wolf	Release date: 1975; Label: Epic Records; Formats: CD, Vinyl Record, cassette, 8-track	155	—	—	—	—	
Skullduggery	Release date: 1976; Label: Epic Records; Formats: CD, Vinyl record, 8-track	—	—	—	—	—	
Wolftracks	Release date: October 1982; Label: Attic Records; Formats: CD, Vinyl record, cassette	—	—	—	—	—	
Paradox	Release date: 1984; Label: Attic Records; Formats: CD, Vinyl record, cassette	—	—	—	—	—	
Rock & Roll Rebels	Release date: 1987; Label: Qwil Records; Formats: CD, Vinyl record, cassette	171	—	—	—	—	
Rise & Shine	Release date: 1990; Label: IRS Records; Formats: CD, Vinyl record, cassette	—	—	—	—	—	
"—" denotes releases that did not chart

=== Live albums ===
Title	Details	Peak chart positions				Certifications (sales threshold)
Title	Details	US	AUS	NOR	UK	Certifications (sales threshold)
Early Steppenwolf	Release date: July 1969; Label: Dunhill Records; Formats: CD, Vinyl record, cassette, 8-track	29	—	—	—	
Steppenwolf Live	Release date: April 1970; Label: Dunhill Records; Formats: CD, Vinyl record, cassette, 8-track	7	16	9	15	US: Gold
Live in London	Release date: 1981 (Australia Only); Label: Mercury Records; Formats: CD, Vinyl record, cassette	—	—	—	—	
Live at 25	Release date: March 17, 1995; Label: K-tel; Formats: CD, cassette	—	—	—	—	
Live in Louisville	Release date: October 5, 2004; Label: Rainman Records; Formats: CD, music download	—	—	—	—	
"—" denotes releases that did not chart

=== Compilation albums ===
Title	Details	Peak positions		Certifications (sales threshold)
Title	Details	US	AUS	Certifications (sales threshold)
Gold: Their Great Hits	Release date: March 1971; Label: Dunhill Records; Formats: CD, Vinyl record, cassette, 8-track	24	38	US: Gold
Rest in Peace	Release date: February 1972; Label: Dunhill Records; Formats: CD, Vinyl record, cassette, 8-track	62	—	
16 Greatest Hits	Release date: February 1973; Label: Dunhill Records; Formats: CD, Vinyl record, cassette, 8-track	152	—	US: Platinum
Sixteen Great Performances	Release date: 1975; Label: ABC Records; Formats: Vinyl record, cassette, 8-track	—	—	
The ABC Collection	Release date: 1976; Label: ABC Records; Formats: CD, Vinyl record, cassette, 8-track	—	—	
The Best of Steppenwolf: Reborn to be Wild	Release date: 1976; Label: Epic Records; Formats: CD, Vinyl record, cassette, 8-track	—	—	
Born to Be Wild - A Retrospective	Release date: 1991; Label: MCA Records; Formats: CD, cassette	—	—	
Feed the Fire	Release date: 1996; Label: Winter Harvest; Formats: CD, Vinyl record, cassette	—	—	
Silver	Release date: November 7, 1997; Label: Phantom Sound & Vision; Formats: CD	—	—	
All Time Greatest Hits	Release date: November 23, 1999; Label: MCA Records; Formats: CD, cassette	—	—	
20th Century Masters – The Millennium Collection: The Best of Steppenwolf	Release date: April 20, 1999; Label: Universal Records; Formats: CD, cassette	—	—	US: Gold
The Collection	Release date: July 8, 2003; Label: Spectrum Music; Formats: CD	—	—	
Steppenwolf Gold	Release date: January 11, 2005; Label: Geffen Records; Formats: CD, music download	—	—	
The ABC/Dunhill Singles Collection	Release date: August 14, 2015; Label: Real Gone Music; Formats: CD	—	—	
"—" denotes releases that did not chart

== Singles ==
Year	Single (A-side / B-side)	Peak chart positions							Certifications (sales threshold)	Album
Year	Single (A-side / B-side)	US	AUS	CAN	AUT	GER	NL	UK	Certifications (sales threshold)	Album
1967	"A Girl I Knew" / "The Ostrich"	—	—	—	—	—	—	—		Steppenwolf
1968	"Sookie Sookie" / "Take What You Need"	—	—	92	—	—	—	—		Steppenwolf
1968	"Born to Be Wild" / "Everybody's Next One"	2	—	1	20	20	5	30	US: Gold; UK: Platinum	Steppenwolf
1968	"Magic Carpet Ride" / "Sookie Sookie"	3	69	1	12	11	—	—	US: Gold; UK: Silver	Steppenwolf the Second
1969	"Rock Me" / "Jupiter's Child"	10	—	4	20	—	—	—		At Your Birthday Party
1969	"It's Never Too Late" / "Happy Birthday"	51	—	33	—	—	—	—		At Your Birthday Party
1969	"Move Over" / "Power Play"	31	—	12	—	19	—	—		Monster
1969	"Monster" / "Berry Rides Again"	39	—	16	—	—	—	—		Monster
1970	"The Pusher" / "Your Wall's Too High" (Note: Used in Easy Rider movie.)	—	—	—	—	—	—	—		Steppenwolf
1970	"Hey Lawdy Mama" / "Twisted"	35	80	18	—	33	—	—		Steppenwolf Live
1970	"Screaming Night Hog" / "Spiritual Fantasy" ("Corina, Corina" b-side of promo single)	62	—	50	—	—	—	—		Gold: Their Great Hits
1970	"Who Needs Ya" / "Earschplittenloudenboomer"	54	—	28	—	—	—	—		Steppenwolf 7
1970	"Snowblind Friend" / "Hippo Stomp"	60	89	37	—	—	—	—		Steppenwolf 7
1971	"Ride with Me" / "For Madmen Only"	52	91	29	—	—	—	—		For Ladies Only
1971	"For Ladies Only" / "Sparkle Eyes"	64	90	28	—	—	—	—		For Ladies Only
1974	"Straight Shootin' Woman" / "Justice Don't Be Slow"	29	—	5	—	—	—	—		Slow Flux
1975	"Get Into the Wind" / "Morning Blue"	—	—	—	—	—	—	—		Slow Flux
1975	"Smokey Factory Blues" / "A Fool's Fantasy"	108	—	—	—	—	—	—		Slow Flux
1975	"Caroline (Are You Ready for the Outlaw World)" / "Angeldrawers"	—	—	—	—	—	—	—		Hour of the Wolf
1981	"Hot Night in a Cold Town" / "Every Man for Himself"	—	—	—	—	—	—	—		Wolftracks
1999	"Born to Be Wild" / "Rock Me" (re-release)	—	—	—	—	—	—	18		20th Century Masters – The Millennium Collection: The Best of Steppenwolf
"—" denotes releases that did not chart

== Videography ==
List of videos, with Labels, showing year released
Title	Year	Label(s)
Hard Times to Hard Rock	1995	K-Tel Video
Living Legends of Rock & Roll - Live from Itchycoo Park	2001	Image Entertainment
Live In Louisville	2004	Rainman Records
Rock N’ Roll Greats	2005	Passport Video
