= 16 Greatest Hits =

Greatest hits album by Steppenwolf
- Released: February 1973
- Recorded: 1967–1971
- Genre: Rock
- Length: 57:47
- Label: ABC Dunhill/MCA
- Producer: Gabriel Mekler, Richard Podolor

Steppenwolf chronology
For Ladies Only (1971)	16 Greatest Hits (1973)	Slow Flux (1974)

Professional ratings
Review scores
Source	Rating
AllMusic	4.5/5 stars

16 Greatest Hits is a compilation album by Steppenwolf, released in 1973. It features some of their most famous songs, including "Born to Be Wild", "The Pusher", and "Magic Carpet Ride", and "Hey Lawdy Mama." The album consisted of the 11 tracks from the previous Gold: Their Great Hits album, in the same order as on the two sides of that earlier album, with the addition of the final two tracks on side 1, and the final three tracks on side 2.

This album was originally issued as Dunhill 50135, and later as ABC/Dunhill with the same number, on LP, 8-track cartridge, and cassette. Following MCA's assimilation of the ABC family of labels, the album was reissued as MCA 1599 (some vinyl copies using previously-pressed LPs with an ABC-Dunhill label), then as budget-label MCA 37049. The album was made available in all formats through several U. S. record clubs, each bearing notes as to their club origin. The album was also issued (under various titles) in Canada, England, Germany, Greece, and the Benelux countries, and was issued on CD in 1985.

== Track listing ==
No.	Title	Writer(s)	Length
1.	"Born to Be Wild" (from Steppenwolf, January 1968)	Mars Bonfire	3:28
2.	"It's Never Too Late" (from At Your Birthday Party, March 1969)	John Kay, Nick St. Nicholas	3:00
3.	"Rock Me" (from At Your Birthday Party, March 1969)	Kay	3:39
4.	"Hey Lawdy Mama" (from Steppenwolf Live, April 1970)	Kay, Larry Byrom, Jerry Edmonton	2:54
5.	"Move Over" (from Monster, November 1969)	Kay, Gabriel Mekler	2:52
6.	"Who Needs Ya" (from Steppenwolf 7, November 1970)	Kay, Byrom	2:55
7.	"Snowblind Friend" (from Steppenwolf 7, November 1970)	Axton	3:52
8.	"Ride with Me" (from For Ladies Only, November 1971)	Bonfire	3:21
9.	"Magic Carpet Ride" (from The Second, October 1968; edited version)	Kay, Rushton Moreve	2:45
10.	"The Pusher" (from Steppenwolf, January 1968)	Axton	5:48
11.	"Sookie Sookie" (from Steppenwolf, January 1968)	Don Covay, Steve Cropper	3:13
12.	"Jupiter's Child" (from At Your Birthday Party, March 1969)	Kay, Edmonton, Michael Monarch	3:22
13.	"Screaming Night Hog" (single, 1970)	Kay	3:14
14.	"For Ladies Only" (from For Ladies Only, November 1971)	Kay, Edmonton, Kent Henry, Goldy McJohn	3:38
15.	"Tenderness" (from For Ladies Only, November 1971)	Bonfire	3:10
16.	"Monster" (from Monster, November 1969; single edit)	Kay, Edmonton	3:54

Note: The version of "Magic Carpet Ride" is not the original single version, but rather, the album version edited down to the length of the single version.

== Personnel ==
- John Kay – lead vocals, guitar
- Larry Byrom – guitar, backing vocals
- Kent Henry – guitar, backing vocals
- Michael Monarch – guitar, backing vocals
- Goldy McJohn – organ, piano, backing vocals
- Rushton Moreve – bass, backing vocals
- Nick St. Nicholas – bass, backing vocals
- George Biondo – bass, backing vocals
- Jerry Edmonton – drums

== Charts ==
Album – Billboard (United States)

Year	Chart	Position
1973	Pop Albums	152
