= Gold: Their Great Hits =

Greatest hits album by Steppenwolf
- Released: March 1971
- Genre: Hard rock
- Length: 40:23
- Label: Dunhill

Steppenwolf chronology
For Ladies Only (1971)	Gold: Their Great Hits (1971)	16 Greatest Hits (1973)

Singles from Gold: Their Great Hits
- 1. "Screaming Night Hog" Released: 30 July 1970

Gold: Their Great Hits is a greatest hits album released by the Canadian-American hard rock band Steppenwolf. The album, released in 1971, charted at #24 on the Billboard Pop Albums charts and was certified "gold" by the RIAA on April 12, 1971. Initial pressings of the album came in a gatefold sleeve, with a detachable poster of the band.

== Reception ==
Professional ratings
Review scores
Source	Rating
Allmusic	4/5 stars

In a retrospective review, Allmusic praised the production and engineering of most of the tracks and called it a "nearly perfect" introduction to the band.

== Record track listing ==
Side one

1. "Born to Be Wild" (Mars Bonfire) – 3:28
2. "It's Never Too Late" (Kay, Nick St. Nicholas) – 4:05
3. "Rock Me" (Dave Grusin, Kay) – 3:39
4. "Hey Lawdy Mama" (Larry Byrom, Jerry Edmonton, Kay) – 3:00
5. "Move Over" (Kay, Gabriel Mekler) – 2:53
6. "Who Needs Ya" (Byrom, Kay) – 2:59

Side two

1. "Magic Carpet Ride" (John Kay, Rushton Moreve) – 4:30
2. "The Pusher" (Hoyt Axton, Kay) – 5:43
3. "Sookie, Sookie" (Don Covay, Steve Cropper) – 3:09
4. "Jupiter's Child" (Edmonton, Kay, Monarch) – 3:24
5. "Screaming Night Hog" (Kay) – 3:17

== Song information ==
"Hey Lawdy Mama"

A single released in 1970, it became a top 40 hit, reaching number 18 in Canada, and peaking at 35 on The Billboard Hot 100. The tune was covered by punk rock group, The Minutemen, for their Project: Mersh EP.

"Screaming Night Hog"

Also released in 1970, it reached number 50 in Canada.

== Personnel ==
- John Kay – vocals, guitar, talk box, harmonica
- Michael Monarch – guitar
- Larry Byrom – guitar
- Nick St. Nicholas – bass guitar
- George Biondo – bass guitar, backing vocals
- Rushton Moreve – bass guitar
- Goldy McJohn – Hammond organ, piano
- Jerry Edmonton – drums

== Charts ==
Chart (1971)	Peak position
Australia (Kent Music Report)	38
US Billboard 200	34
