= Nick St. Nicholas =

German-Canadian rock musician

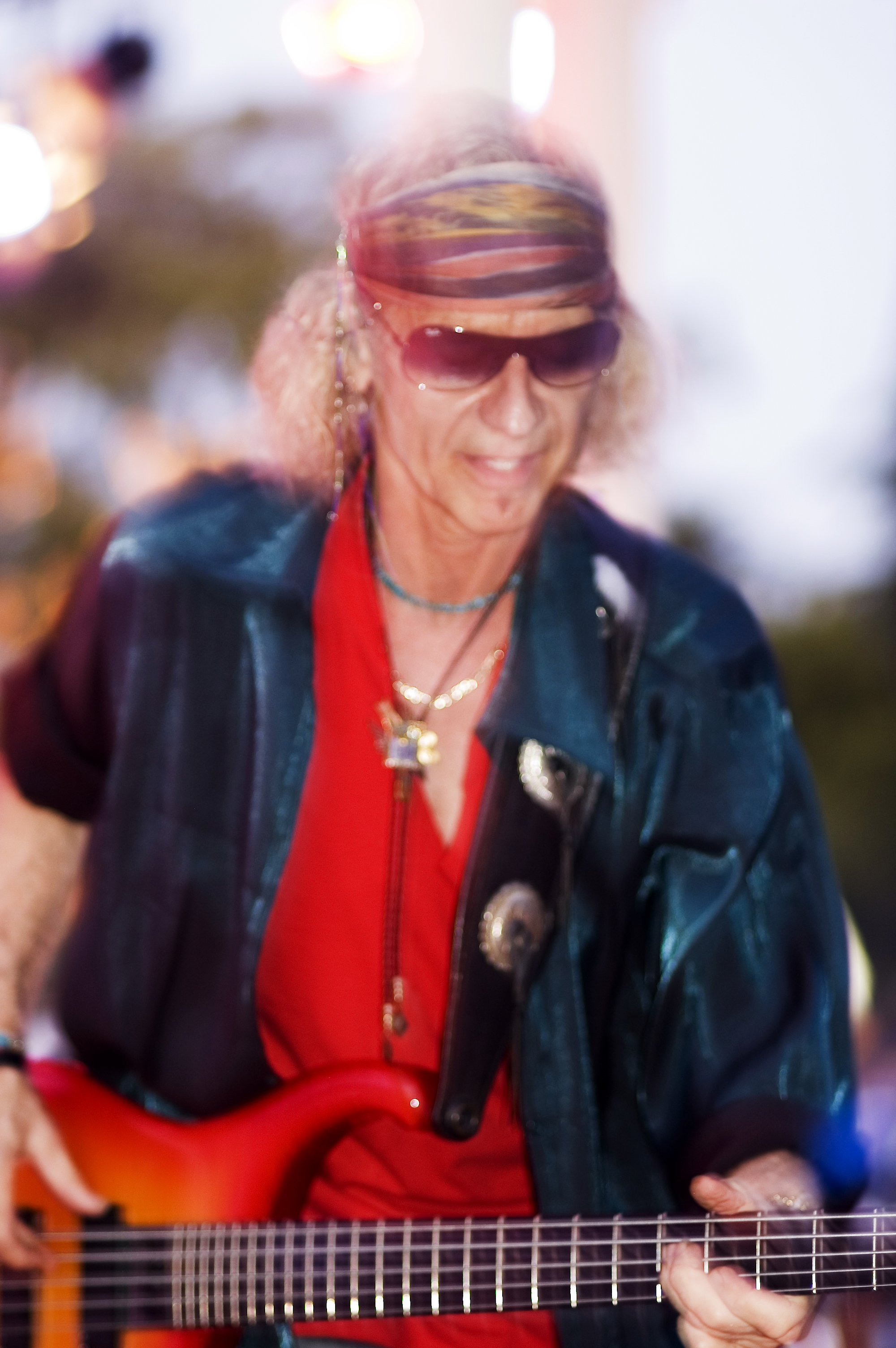
- St. Nicholas in 2007

Background information
- Born: Klaus Karl Kassbaum; September 28, 1943 (age 82); Plön, Germany
- Origin: Toronto, Canada
- Genres: Psychedelic rock; acid rock; blues rock; hard rock; heavy metal
- Occupations: Musician, songwriter
- Instruments: Bass guitar, vocals
- Years active: 1964–present
- Website: wcr.com/about-wcr/

Nick St. Nicholas (born Klaus Karl Kassbaum on September 28, 1943) is a German-born Canadian musician who was the bassist of the rock band Steppenwolf in the late 1960s.

== Early life ==
He was born in Plön, Schleswig-Holstein and his family moved to Toronto after World War II and became Canadian citizens. His sister Maren joined the Royal Conservatory of Music, (Canadian Ballet Company & Conservatory of Music), as a pianist. He also has a younger brother, Gary who entered the Merchant navy.

== Early career ==
Kassbaum spent a brief period as bassist with the Epics, then Shirley Matthews and the Big Town Boys before organizing a set of musicians who eventually coalesced as the Mynah Birds, featuring singers Rick James, Neil Young, and Jimmy Livingston.

In 1965, Kassbaum replaced Bruce Palmer as bassist with Jack London and the Sparrows, became Nick St. Nicholas, and played on most of the tracks on their only LP, which was released in that year. As the band leader, St. Nicholas hired East Prussian-born front man John Kay when Jack London left the Sparrows, and they became Sparrow. He moved the band south to New York for a modest record deal with Columbia Records, then drove Sparrow non-stop to California.

St. Nicholas was one of the driving forces in music of the hippie counterculture movement, the Summer of Love. Having booked the band at the Matrix club in San Francisco, on May 14, 1967, two live shows were recorded, including a 20-minute version of "The Pusher." These are the live recordings released by ABC Dunhill Records as Early Steppenwolf.

In 1967, St. Nicholas also joined a Los Angeles–based group called the Hardtimes, who soon renamed themselves T.I.M.E., which stands for Trust in Men Everywhere. Capitol Records signed them to a $500,000 recording contract, but their manager, the now deceased Ron Levin, turned out to be a con man and absconded with the advance and all of the band's earnings.

Prior to the formation of the Steppenwolf partnership in 1968, music producer-arranger Gabriel Mekler changed the name from Sparrow to Steppenwolf based on a book he was reading at the time by Hermann Hesse.

== Steppenwolf ==
After having recorded two albums without him, St. Nicholas's Sparrow bandmates, (vocalist/guitarist John Kay, drummer Jerry Edmonton and organist Goldy McJohn) came to see him perform with T.I.M.E. at the Whisky a Go Go on the Sunset Strip and asked him to leave T.I.M.E. to rejoin them as Steppenwolf.

"1967, John Kay, Jerry Edmonton, Michael Monarch and Goldie McJohn formed a musical band called 'Steppenwolf.' In 1968, Nicholas Kassbaum, who is professionally known as 'Nick St. Nicholas,' joined Steppenwolf as a bass player. That year, the band members entered into a partnership agreement whereby the members became co-equal partners and owners in Steppenwolf, and agreed to share equally the band's expenses and income. Also in 1968, the band members signed a recording agreement with Dunhill Records both as partners and as Steppenwolf band members. From late 1968 until late April 1970, Steppenwolf, with Kassbaum as its bass player, toured the world in concerts and recorded Steppenwolf 's well-received music. Kassbaum appeared prominently on Steppenwolf record album covers and authored Steppenwolf compositions. In 1970, John Kay, who had asserted control over Steppenwolf, excluded Kassbaum from the band." – 9th Circuit

St. Nicholas has several Gold and Platinum records to his credit playing and contributing on four Steppenwolf albums: At Your Birthday Party, Early Steppenwolf, Monster, and Steppenwolf Live. He performed on many television shows as a member of Steppenwolf, including The Ed Sullivan Show, August 17, 1969, where the band performed a medley of "Born to Be Wild" / "Magic Carpet Ride" and a complete version of "It's Never Too Late", The Smothers Brothers, American Bandstand, Playboy After Dark, Beat Club, Della, Upbeat, and The Steve Allen Show, as well as VH1's Behind the Music. St. Nicholas was squeezed out of Steppenwolf in a power play by Kay in 1971. Grammy Awards board member and former manager of T.I.M.E. Jeff Greenberg came to see St. Nicholas to inform him that Steppenwolf was at a rehearsal at SIR Studios with a new bassist, George Biondo. More than twenty years of still-unresolved litigation followed.

Following St. Nicholas's ouster from Steppenwolf, he replaced Dickie Peterson in Blue Cheer alongside Ruben De Fuentes on guitar and Terry Rae on drums. The band both toured and recorded during this time, but the songs were not released until Live & Unreleased '68/'74 was released in 1996.

After Kay and Edmonton's version of Steppenwolf disbanded in 1976, St. Nicholas reformed the group with McJohn and guitarist Kent Henry, who had replaced Larry Byrom in the group and recorded the guitar tracks on the For Ladies Only album in 1971. There were several other versions of this band touring at the same time for which St. Nicholas was not responsible. During this time, St. Nicholas's Steppenwolf included drummers such as Steve Riley and Frankie Banali.

St. Nicholas stopped touring with Steppenwolf in 1980 due to legal actions by Kay.

== Post-Steppenwolf ==
In 1980, St. Nicholas formed a band called Starwolf with keyboardist Steve Stewart along with drummer Dean Woytcke. Stewart left in the late 1980s and Randy Carr joined; about the same time guitarist Dave Olsen joined and Starwolf became Lone Wolf. In 1988, Kurt Griffey was added as a second guitarist and Chris Sweeney joined as the band's drummer. After Lone Wolf became the Wolf continuing from 1988 to 1989, Ronnie Carson took over for Sweeney and Olsen left.

In the early 1990s, St. Nicholas formed a new Lone Wolf with Griffey, singer Richard Ward, and drummer Daryl Johnson, featuring at bike rallies and clubs, continuing until 1997.

== World Classic Rockers ==
In 1997 St. Nicholas began a new heavy metal chapter as he launched the supergroup World Classic Rockers, bringing Griffey with him into the new venture along with Sparrow and Steppenwolf bandmate Michael Monarch. Members include former members of Steppenwolf, Santana, Toto, Journey, Lynyrd Skynyrd, Boston, Kansas, Eagles and others. The World Classic Rockers (WCR) prepare to celebrate the 20-year anniversary.

== Studio albums ==
- T.I.M.E.
  1968
  Liberty Records
- At Your Birthday Party
  1969
  U.S. #7
  Gold
  Dunhill Records
- Monster
  1969
  U.S. #17
  U.K. #43
  Gold
  Dunhill Records
- Live & Unreleased '68/'74
  1996
  Captain Trip Records
- Country Magic
  1984
  Gold Star Records

== Live albums ==
- Early Steppenwolf
  1969 (recorded in 1967 as the Sparrow)
  U.S. #29
  Dunhill Records
- Steppenwolf Live
  1970
  U.S. #7
  U.K. #16
  Gold
  Dunhill Records
- World Classic Rockers: Live (1st edition)
  WCR Records
- World Classic Rockers: Live (2nd edition)
  WCR Records
- World Classic Rockers: Live (3rd edition)
  WCR Records
- World Classic Rockers: Live (4th edition)
  WCR Records
- World Classic Rockers: Live (5th edition)
  WCR Records
- World Classic Rockers: Live (6th edition)
  WCR Records
- Blue Cheer Live & Unreleased, Vol. 1: '68/'74 (1996; Captain Trip Records)

== Compilations ==
- Gold: Their Great Hits
  1971
  U.S. #24
  Gold
  Dunhill Records
- Rest in Peace
  1972
  U.S. #62
  Dunhill Records
- 16 Greatest Hits
  1973
  U.S. #152
  Gold
  Dunhill Records
- The ABC Collection
  1976
  ABC Records
- Born to Be Wild - A Retrospective
  1991
  MCA Records
- All Time Greatest Hits
  1999
  MCA Records
- 20th Century Masters - The Millennium Collection: The Best of Steppenwolf
  2000
  Gold
  Universal Music Group
- Steppenwolf Gold
  2005
  Geffen Records

== Singles ==
Release date	A-side	B-side	US chart peak	UK chart peak
1968	"Make It Alright	"Take Me Along"		
1968	"What Would Life Be Without It"	"Tripping into Sunshine"		
1969	"Rock Me" (Kay)	"Jupiter Child" (Monarch/Kay/Edmonton)	10	
1969	"It's Never Too Late" (St. Nicholas/Kay)	"Happy Birthday" (Mekler)	51	
1969	"Move Over" (Kay/Mekler)	"Power Play" (Kay)	31	
1969	"Monster" (Kay/Edmonton/St. Nicholas/Byrom)	"Berry Rides Again" (Kay)	39	
1970	"Hey Lawdy Mama" (Kay/Byrom/Edmonton)	"Twisted" (Kay)	35	

Preceded by Rushton Moreve	Steppenwolf Bass Guitarist Vocalist; 1968–1971	Succeeded by George Biondo

Preceded by George Biondo	Steppenwolf Bass Guitarist Vocalist; 1976–1980	Succeeded by Chad Peery
