= Forgotten Songs and Unsung Heroes =

Studio album by John Kay
- Released: 1972
- Genre: Blues-rock
- Label: Dunhill Records
- Producer: Richard Podolor

John Kay chronology
Forgotten Songs and Unsung Heroes (1972)	My Sportin' Life (1973)

Professional ratings
Review scores
Source	Rating
AllMusic	3/5 stars
The Rolling Stone Album Guide	3/5 stars

Forgotten Songs and Unsung Heroes is the first solo album by German-Canadian musician John Kay. It was released on Dunhill Records in 1972.

Kay was well known as the lead singer of the band Steppenwolf. His first solo album contained a mixture of rock songs and country songs, including a number of covers.

Kay toured in support of the album on the 1972 Steppenwolf European farewell tour. The John Kay band was the support band and would play a short set before Steppenwolf came on. Steppenwolf members George Biondo (bass/vocals) and Kent Henry (lead guitar) played in both The John Kay Band and Steppenwolf during the tour.

== Critical reception ==
AllMusic called the album "a serious attempt by Kay to break away from the hard rock persona he established with Steppenwolf ... that he pulls it off is impressive." The Rolling Stone Album Guide praised Kay's "cool" cover of "I'm Moving On." Billboard called the album "an affirmation of the talent that was overshadowed by [Steppenwolf's] flashy pyrotechnics."

== Track listing ==
All tracks composed by John Kay; except where indicated

1. "Many a Mile" (Patrick Sky)
2. "Walk Beside Me"
3. "You Win Again" (Hank Williams)
4. "To Be Alive"
5. "Bold Marauder" (Richard Fariña)
6. "Two of a Kind"
7. "Walkin' Blues" (Robert Johnson)
8. "Somebody"
9. "I'm Moving On" (Hank Snow)

== Charts ==
Chart (1972)	Peak position
Australia (Kent Music Report)	48

== Personnel ==
- John Kay - vocals, guitars
- Kent Henry - lead guitar
- Hugh O'Sullivan - keyboards
- George Biondo - bass
- Pentti Glan - drums

with:

- Mars Bonfire - lead guitar on "I'm Moving On"
- Richard Podolor - guitar, organ, mandolin, percussion
- Alexandra Sliwin, Joan Sliwin, Marsha Temmer

Technical

- Bill Cooper - engineer
- Tom Gundelfinger - art direction, design, photography
