= George Biondo =

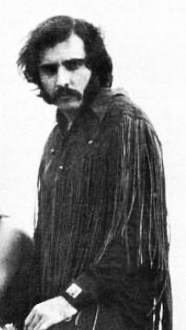
- Biondo with Steppenwolf in 1971

Background information
- Born: George Michael Biondo; September 3, 1945 (age 80); Brooklyn, New York, U.S.
- Genres: Acid rock, hard rock, psychedelic rock, heavy metal
- Occupations: Session musician, songwriter
- Instrument: Bass
- Years active: 1967-present
- Labels: Dunhill Records; Mums Records; Epic Records; MCA Records; Dore Records

George Michael Biondo (born September 3, 1945) is a musician who served as bass guitarist of the Canadian rock band Steppenwolf from April 1970 to October 1976. Born in New York, Biondo has been based in Southern California throughout a career as a session musician and songwriter.

== Early career ==
Biondo played bass in a Los Angeles area band called Storybook People during which time they released a single on Dunhill Records, which received limited airplay in Los Angeles. In 1968, Biondo replaced Nick St. Nicholas in another Los Angeles area band called T.I.M.E., when St. Nicholas departed for Steppenwolf. After T.I.M.E. guitarist Larry Byrom also left to join Steppenwolf, T.I.M.E. briefly attempted to carry on with Biondo as lead singer, but never released any further recordings.

== Steppenwolf ==
In early 1970, Biondo replaced St. Nicholas a second time when he joined Steppenwolf for the recording of Steppenwolf 7, contributing lead vocals on "Fat Jack" and co-lead vocals on "Foggy Mental Breakdown" and the chart-hit, "Who Needs Ya'". In 1971, the band released their last new album for Dunhill, For Ladies Only for which Biondo wrote "Sparkle Eyes" with John Kay and "In Hopes of a Garden". He sang lead on the latter, as well as "Jaded Strumpet". When Steppenwolf went on hiatus in 1972, Biondo became a founding member of the John Kay Band, appearing on both of Kay's solo albums on Dunhill Records. When Steppenwolf reconvened in the mid-1970s, Biondo was brought back for the album Slow Flux. Then writing "Two for the Love of One" for the Hour of the Wolf album. Biondo later wrote "Sleep" and co-wrote the instrumental "Lip Service" with Bobby Cochran and Wayne Cook for the Skullduggery album in 1976. In 1981, Biondo added backing vocals to Wolftracks, the first studio album by John Kay and his new band, now under the moniker John Kay & Steppenwolf.

== After Steppenwolf ==
In 1980, Biondo reunited with Steppenwolf cofounder Jerry Edmonton in a band called Steel Rose. A Steel Rose single penned by Biondo, "Good That You're Gone", was released on Dore Records, and featured Biondo on lead vocals. When Steel Rose disbanded in 1984, Biondo returned to writing and freelance club and session work.

== Discography ==
=== Studio albums ===
- 7
  1970
  U.S. #19
  Gold
  Dunhill Records
- For Ladies Only
  1971
  U.S. #54
  Dunhill Records
- Forgotten Songs and Unsung Heroes
  1972
  Dunhill Records
- My Sportin Life ("Sing with the Children" only)
  1973
  Dunhill Records
- Slow Flux
  1974
  U.S. #47
  Mums Records
- Hour of the Wolf
  1975
  U.S. #155
  Epic Records
- Skullduggery
  1976
  Epic Records
- Wolftracks
  1982
  Attic Records
- Good That You're Gone
  1984
  Dore Records

== Compilations ==
- Gold: Their Great Hits
  1971
  U.S. #24
  Gold
  Dunhill Records
- Rest In Peace
  1972
  U.S. #62
  Dunhill Records
- 16 Greatest Hits
  1973
  U.S. #152
  Gold
  Dunhill Records
- The ABC Collection
  1976
  ABC Records
- Reborn To Be Wild
  1976
  Epic Records
- Born to Be Wild - A Retrospective
  1991
  MCA Records
- All Time Greatest Hits
  1999
  MCA Records
- 20th Century Masters - The Millennium Collection: The Best of Steppenwolf
  2000
  Gold
  Universal Music Group
- Steppenwolf Gold
  2005
  Geffen Records

== Singles ==
Release date	A-side	B-side	US Chart Peak	UK Chart Peak
1967	"Do You Believe"			
1967	"Afternoon Glare"	"No Return"		
1970	"Screaming Night Hog" (Kay)	"Spiritual Fantasy" (Kay)	62	
1970	"Who Needs Ya" (Byrom/Kay)	"Earschplittenloudenboomer" (Byrom)	54	
1970	"Snowblind Friend" (Axton)	"Hippo Stomp" (Byrom/Kay)		
1971	"Ride With Me" (Bonfire)	"For Madmen Only"	52	
1971	"For Ladies Only" (Edmonton/Henry/Kay/McJohn)	"Sparkle Eyes" (Biondo/Kay)	64	
1974	"Straight Shootin' Woman" (Edmonton)	"Justice Don't Be Slow" (Kay/Richie)	29	
1975	"Get Into The Wind" (Cochran/Van Beek)	"Morning Blue" (Biondo)		
1975	"Smokey Factory Blues" (Hammond/Hazlewood)	"A Fool's Fantasy" (McJohn)		
1975	"Caroline (Are You Ready)" (Bonfire)	"Angeldrawers"		
