= Ride with Me (Steppenwolf song) =

"Ride With Me"

Single by Steppenwolf

from the album For Ladies Only
- Released: June 1971
- Genre: Hard rock
- Length: 3:24
- Label: MCA
- Songwriter(s): Mars Bonfire
- Producer(s): Richard Podolor

"Ride With Me" is a song by rock band Steppenwolf featured on their album For Ladies Only. It was originally performed by Mars Bonfire on his self-titled album with a length over six minutes and under the title "Ride With Me, Baby". The song peaked at 52 on The Billboard Hot 100.

== Cover versions ==
- The tune was covered by The Alice Cooper Band and appeared in the film Diary of a Mad Housewife.
