= Gold: Greatest Hits =

Gold: Greatest Hits may refer to:

- Gold: Greatest Hits (ABBA album), an album by ABBA
- Gold: Greatest Hits (Steps album), an album by Steps
- Gold: Greatest Hits (video), a video by The Carpenters

== See also ==
- Gold – 20 Super Hits, an album by Boney M
- Gold: Their Great Hits, an album by Steppenwolf
