= Rise & Shine (Steppenwolf album) =

Studio album by Steppenwolf
- Released: 1990
- Recorded: 1989
- Genre: Rock
- Length: 43:32 (Original Release) 51:50 (with Bonus Tracks), Capitol
- Label: I.R.S. (MCA)
- Producer: John Kay; Michael Wilk

Steppenwolf chronology
| Rock & Roll Rebels (1987) | Rise & Shine (1990) | Live at 25 (1995) |

Professional ratings
Review scores
| Source | Rating |
|---|---|
| AllMusic | 3/5 stars |
| Select | 1/5 medals |

Rise & Shine is the thirteenth and final studio album by John Kay and Steppenwolf, released in 1990 under the label IRS Records. It features "The Wall", John Kay's song celebrating the fall of the Berlin Wall, and "Rock 'N Roll War", Kay's homage to veterans of the Vietnam War.

== Track listing ==
1. "Let's Do It All" (Kay, Ritchotte, Wilk) – 3:58
2. "Time Out" (Kay, Ritchotte, Wilk) – 3:46
3. "Do or Die" (Kay, Wilk) – 4:06
4. "Rise and Shine" (Kay, Wilk) – 4:05
5. "The Wall" (Kay, Ritchotte, Wilk) – 6:21
6. "The Daily Blues" (Kay, Ritchotte, Wilk) – 3:36
7. "Keep Rockin'" (Kay, Wilk) – 4:03
8. "Rock 'N Roll War" (Kay, Ritchotte, Wilk) – 7:06
9. "Sign on the Line" (Kay, Ritchotte, Wilk) – 3:45
10. "We Like It, We Love It (We Want More of It)" (Kay, Ritchotte, Wilk) – 4:06

Bonus tracks

11. "Lonely Dreamers" (Kay, Ritchotte) – 4:06
12. "Now and Forever" (Kay, Ritchotte, Wilk) – 4:12

== Personnel ==
=== Steppenwolf ===
- John Kay – guitar, lead vocals
- Michael Wilk – keyboards, bass, programming
- Ronald "Rocket" Ritchotte – lead guitar, vocals
- Ron Hurst – drums, vocals

=== Technical ===
- John Kay, Michael Wilk, Rocket Ritchotte – producers
- Glenn Meadows – mastering
- Neil Zlozower – photography (back cover)
- John Taylor DisMukes – illustration (front cover)
