= Jerry Edmonton =

Canadian drummer (1946–1993)

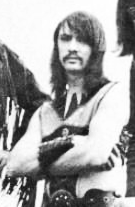
- Edmonton with Steppenwolf

Background information
- Born: Gerald McCrohan; October 24, 1946; Oshawa, Ontario, Canada
- Died: November 28, 1993 (aged 47) Santa Ynez, California, U.S.
- Genres: Hard rock; heavy metal; Instrumental rock; blues rock; funk rock; folk rock
- Occupation: Musician
- Instruments: Drums; vocals
- Years active: 1964–1993

Gerald Michael Edmonton (born Gerald McCrohan, October 24, 1946 – November 28, 1993) was a Canadian musician who was the drummer and secondary lead vocalist for the rock band Steppenwolf.

== Early life and career ==
Edmonton was born in Oshawa, Ontario. Both his brother Dennis, also known as Mars Bonfire, and he changed their surnames to Edmonton during the 1960s, when they performed in a group called The Sparrows. John Kay and Goldy McJohn joined this group in Toronto in 1965 and, after some more changes in personnel and relocating to California, the group was renamed Steppenwolf.

When Steppenwolf temporarily broke up on February 14, 1972, Edmonton and Steppenwolf organist Goldy McJohn formed the band Seven with singer Lance Gullickson and guitarist Robin Huff. After Seven, Edmonton, and McJohn formed Manbeast with Rod Prince and Roy Cox of Bubble Puppy before Steppenwolf reconvened in 1974 for three albums before breaking up again in 1976.

== Personal life ==
Edmonton married former Steppenwolf bandmate Andy Chapin's widow in the 1980s.

Edmonton died in a car accident in Santa Ynez, California, on November 28, 1993. His car failed to negotiate a curve on Baseline Avenue, striking a dirt bank before flipping over, ejecting him through the rear window. (Two passengers in the car survived.)

== Discography ==
Studio albums
Name	Year
Presenting Jack London & The Sparrows	1965
Steppenwolf	1968
The Second	1968
John Kay & The Sparrow	1969
At Your Birthday Party	1969
Monster	1969
Steppenwolf 7	1970
For Ladies Only	1971
Slow Flux	1974
Hour of the Wolf	1975
Skullduggery	1976

Live albums
Name	Year
Early Steppenwolf	1969
Steppenwolf Live	1970

Compilations
Name	Year
Gold: Their Great Hits	1971
Rest In Peace	1972
16 Greatest Hits	1973
The ABC Collection	1976
Reborn To Be Wild	1976
Born to be Wild – A Retrospective	1991
All Time Greatest Hits	1999
20th Century Masters – The Millennium Collection: The Best of Steppenwolf	2000
Steppenwolf Gold	2005

Singles

Release date	A-side	B-side	US Billboard Hot 100 peak	UK Singles Chart peak
1967	"A Girl I Knew" (Kay/Cavett)	"The Ostrich" (Kay)		
1968	"Born to Be Wild" (Bonfire)	"Everybody's Next One" (Kay/Mekler)	#2	#30
1968	"Sookie Sookie" (Covay/Cropper)	"Take What You Need" (Kay/Mekler)		
1968	"Magic Carpet Ride" (Moreve/Kay)	"Sookie Sookie" (Covay/Cropper)	#3	
1969	"Rock Me" (Kay)	"Jupiter Child" (Monarch/Kay/Edmonton)	#10	
1969	"It's Never Too Late" (St. Nicholas/Kay)	"Happy Birthday" (Mekler)	#51	
1969	"Move Over" (Kay/Mekler)	"Power Play" (Kay)	#31	
1969	"Monster" (Kay/Edmonton/St. Nicholas/Byrom)	"Berry Rides Again" (Kay)	#39	
1970	"Hey Lawdy Mama" (Kay/Byrom/Edmonton)	"Twisted" (Kay)	#35	
1970	"Screaming Night Hog" (Kay)	"Spiritual Fantasy" (Kay)	#62	
1970	"Who Needs Ya" (Byrom/Kay)	"Earschplittenloudenboomer" (Byrom)	#54	
1970	"Snowblind Friend" (Axton)	"Hippo Stomp" (Byrom/Kay)		
1971	"Ride With Me" (Bonfire)	"For Madmen Only"	#52	
1971	"For Ladies Only" (Edmonton/Henry/Kay/McJohn)	"Sparkle Eyes" (Biondo/Kay)	#64	
1974	"Straight Shootin' Woman" (Edmonton)	"Justice Don't Be Slow" (Kay/Richie)	#29	
1975	"Get Into The Wind" (Cochran/Van Beek)	"Morning Blue" (Biondo)		
1975	"Smokey Factory Blues" (Hammond/Hazlewood)	"A Fool's Fantasy" (McJohn)		
1975	"Caroline (Are You Ready)" (Bonfire)	"Angeldrawers"		
1979	"Brand New Key"			
1984	"Good That You're Gone"			
