= Kent Henry =

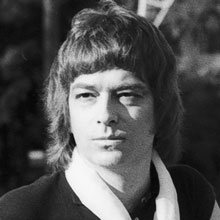

Background information
- Born: Kent Henry Plischke; April 5, 1948; Hollywood, Los Angeles, U.S.
- Died: March 18, 2009 (aged 60) Portland, Oregon, U.S.
- Genres: Hard rock; psychedelic rock; heavy metal; blues rock; rock and roll; folk rock
- Occupations: Musician; songwriter
- Instrument: Guitar
- Years active: 1967–2009

Kent Henry Plischke (April 5, 1948 – March 18, 2009), known as Kent Henry, was an American guitarist and songwriter best known for his contributions to Steppenwolf and Blues Image.

== Blues Image ==
Henry joined Blues Image during the sessions for Open after Mike Pinera agreed to join Iron Butterfly. His significant contributions to that album, although uncredited, included the tasteful clean solo and fills on "Ride Captain Ride." Mike Pinera plays the distorted solo at the end of the song. After recording Red, White, and Blues Image, producer Richard Podolor suggested to Steppenwolf that Henry would be a good replacement for departed guitarist Larry Byrom.

== Steppenwolf ==
Henry recorded For Ladies Only and toured with the band on their farewell tour, in addition to his contributions on John Kay's first solo album, Forgotten Songs and Unsung Heroes. Henry was not invited to rejoin the band when it reformed to record Slow Flux and found out about it when new guitarist Bobby Cochran called him for advice, believing it was Henry's choice to not be a part of Steppenwolf. Goldy McJohn, the band's keyboardist at the time, says Henry was fired because he didn't get along well with drummer Jerry Edmonton.

Henry remained on good terms with McJohn, and played with McJohn in 1977, 1978 and 1980 versions of Steppenwolf led by McJohn, but without lead singer John Kay. At the time of Henry's death, he was planning to rejoin McJohn as part of "Goldy McJohn and Friendz", a band that McJohn had formed to play Steppenwolf songs, following the announcement that John Kay and Steppenwolf planned to substantially cease touring.

== Later years ==
Henry settled in Portland, Oregon, as of the early 1980s, and would remain there for the balance of his life. He played in local bands (principally the Paul deLay Blues Band) and worked primarily as a guitar technician.

During his later years, Henry encountered increasing difficulties with seizures, which had originally appeared following a fall off the stage of the Whisky a Go Go. He also developed the early stages of Alzheimer's disease shortly before his death. As a consequence of these challenges and given that care by family members was unavailable to him, Henry was under the constant care of friends, from 2005 until his death. Henry was taken to the hospital by his caregiver and died on the operating table.

== Discography ==
=== Studio albums ===
- Genesis - In the Beginning (1968)
- Charity - Now (1969)
- Blues Image - Red White & Blues Image (1970)
- Steppenwolf - For Ladies Only (1971)

Guest appearances

- Screaming Lord Sutch - Lord Sutch and Heavy Friends (1970)
- Blues Image - Open (1970)
- John Kay - Forgotten Songs and Unsung Heroes (1972)
- John Kay - My Sportin' Life (1973)

=== Singles ===
Release date	A-side	B-side	US Chart Peak	UK Chart Peak
1970	"Ride Captain Ride" (Pinera/Konte)	"Pay my Dues"	#4	
1970	"Gas Lamps and Clay"	"Running the Water"	#81	
1971	"Ride With Me" (Bonfire)	"For Madmen Only"	#52	
1971	"For Ladies Only" (Edmonton/Henry/Kay/McJohn)	"Sparkle Eyes" (Biondo/Kay)	#64	
1972	"I'm Movin' On" (Snow)	"Walk Beside Me" (Kay)	#54	
1972	"Somebody" (Kay)	"You Win Again" (Williams)		
1975	"I Found You"	"Coming Down"		
