= Wolftracks =

Studio album by Steppenwolf
- Released: 1982
- Recorded: 1982
- Studios: Ocean Way, Hollywood, California
- Genre: Rock
- Length: 45:09
- Label: Wolf
- Producers: John Kay, Richard Podolor

Steppenwolf chronology
Skullduggery (1976)	Wolftracks (1982)	Paradox (1984)

Singles from Wolftracks
- 1. "Hot Night in a Cold Town" Released: 1981

Wolftracks is an album by John Kay and Steppenwolf, released in 1982 by Wolf Records, with distribution by Nautilus Records in the U.S. and Attic Records in Canada. It was the first new studio album in six years for Kay, featuring a new line-up of Steppenwolf and Kay renaming the group accordingly.

== Background ==
In 1980, Kay reclaimed the Steppenwolf name, touring as “John Kay & Steppenwolf.” The album Wolftracks, the first after the band reformed, was recorded "live" in the studio on a 2-track digital recorder, which was then a new medium.

== Critical reception ==
Professional ratings
Review scores
Source	Rating
AllMusic	2/5 stars
The Rolling Stone Album Guide	1/5 stars

The Globe and Mail wrote that "the basic elements are all there: Kay's husky, Wilson Pickett singing style dominates the digitally processed mix, and Michael Wilk adds the familiar, fat organ sounds to the lurching, half-soul and half-rock beat."

== Track listing ==
Side one

1. "All I Want Is All You Got" (John Kay) – 3:55
2. "Time" (Kay, Michael Palmer, Kevin Kern) – 3:31
3. "None of the Above" (Kay, M. Palmer, Steven Palmer) – 5:59
4. "You" (Kay) – 3:50
5. "Every Man for Himself" (Kay) – 3:19
6. "Five Finger Discount" (Kay) – 4:36

Side two

1. "Hold Your Head Up" (Rod Argent, Chris White) – 3:42
2. "Hot Night in a Cold Town" (Rick Littlefield, Geoffrey Cushing-Murray) – 3:20
3. "Down to Earth" (Kim Fowley, Ross Wilson) – 3:00
4. "For Rock-n-Roll" (Kay) – 3:42
5. "The Balance" (Kay) – 6:15

== Personnel ==
John Kay and Steppenwolf

- John Kay – guitar, vocals
- Michael Wilk – keyboards, vocals
- Michael Palmer – lead guitar, vocals
- Welton Gite – bass
- Steven Palmer – drums, percussion, vocals

Additional musicians

- Brett Tuggle, George Biondo – backing vocals

Technical

- John Kay – producer
- Richard Podolor – producer (track 1)
- Kevin Kern – engineer, assistant producer
- Rich Feldman – engineer
- Mark Ettel, Steve Crimmel – assistant engineers
- Bruce Leek, Richard Donaldson – mastering
- Drennon Studio – art direction
- John Exley – photography
