= Hour of the Wolf (album) =

Studio album by Steppenwolf
- Released: September 1975
- Recorded: March–May 1975
- Studio: John Kay's Studio
- Genre: Hard rock; acid rock
- Length: 37:58
- Label: Epic
- Producer: Steppenwolf

Steppenwolf chronology
Slow Flux (1974)	Hour of the Wolf (1975)	Skullduggery (1976)

Singles from Hour of the Wolf
- 1. "Caroline (Are You Ready)" Released: June 1975

Hour of the Wolf is the eighth studio album by Canadian-American rock band Steppenwolf. The album was released in September 1975, by Epic Records. Andy Chapin replaced original keyboardist Goldy McJohn on the album.

== Reception ==
Professional ratings
Review scores
Source	Rating
AllMusic	2.5/5 stars

AllMusic gave the album a negative retrospective review, saying the songs are all competent but adhere too closely to Steppenwolf formulas that had already been played out.

Hour Of The Wolf did not have a signature hit single like their previous albums did. "Caroline. . .," written by Mars Bonfire, was released as a single but failed to chart.

== Track listing ==
Side one
No.	Title	Writer(s)	Length
1.	"Caroline (Are You Ready for the Outlaw World?)"	Mars Bonfire	4:53
2.	"Annie, Annie Over"	Alan O'Day	4:12
3.	"Two for the Love of One"	George Biondo, Jerry Edmonton	3:46
4.	"Just for Tonight"	Bobby Cochran, Edmonton	5:39

Side two
No.	Title	Writer(s)	Length
5.	"Hard Rock Road"	Edmonton	3:32
6.	"Someone Told a Lie"	Cochran, John Kay	5:07
7.	"Another's Lifetime"	Wayne Berry	4:34
8.	"Mr. Penny Pincher"	Van Dunson	6:15

== Personnel ==
=== Steppenwolf ===
- John Kay – lead vocals, rhythm guitar, harmonica
- Jerry Edmonton – drums, percussion, backing vocals, art direction
- George Biondo – bass, vocals
- Bobby Cochran – lead guitar, vocals
- Andy Chapin – keyboards, backing vocals

=== Additional musicians ===
- Tom Scott – horns (tracks 1, 5)

=== Technical ===
- Steppenwolf – producers
- Ed Bannon – engineer
- Roy Halee – mixing
- Lorrie Sullivan – design, photography

== Charts ==
Album - Billboard (United States)

Year	Chart	Position
1975	Billboard 200	155
