= Steppenwolf 7 =

Studio album by Steppenwolf
- Released: November 1970
- Genre: Psychedelic rock; blues rock; hard rock
- Length: 39:57
- Label: Dunhill
- Producer: Richard Podolor

Steppenwolf chronology
Steppenwolf Live (1970)	Steppenwolf 7 (1970)	For Ladies Only (1971)

Singles from Steppenwolf 7
- 1. "Who Needs Ya'" Released: 7 October 1970; 2. "Snowblind Friend" Released: January 1971

Professional ratings
Review scores
Source	Rating
AllMusic	2/5 stars
Christgau's Record Guide	C−

Steppenwolf 7 is the fifth studio album by Canadian-American rock band Steppenwolf. The album was released in November 1970, by Dunhill Records. It is the first Steppenwolf album with new bass player George Biondo. The album’s numerical title reflects the fact that it was the band’s seventh album release for ABC/Dunhill records (including the four preceding studio LP’s, as well as two live albums). While the album featured Steppenwolf's trademark rock and roll sounds, none of the songs were able to make the top 40. The album featured a cover of Hoyt Axton's "Snowblind Friend", their second cover of one of his antidrug songs (the first being "The Pusher"). Along with "Who Needs Ya'", it was one of two singles from the album which made the charts, but fell short of the top 40. The album track "Renegade" is autobiographical for lead vocalist John Kay, recounting his flight with his mother from the Soviet occupation zone to the West in 1948. The intro to "Earschplittenloudenboomer" is spoken by Kay partially in German.

== Critical reception ==
Robert Christgau stated: "Laying back hasn't been good for them, and neither has getting heavy. Their way lies somewhere in between--which come to think of it is also how it is for the rest of us."

== Track listing ==
Side one
No.	Title	Writer(s)	Length
1.	"Ball Crusher"	John Kay, Jerry Edmonton, Goldy McJohn	4:50
2.	"Forty Days and Forty Nights"	Bernie Roth	3:02
3.	"Fat Jack"	George Biondo, Edmonton, Larry Byrom	4:50
4.	"Renegade"	Biondo, McJohn, Kay	6:07

Side two
No.	Title	Writer(s)	Length
1.	"Foggy Mental Breakdown"	Byrom, Kay	3:52
2.	"Snowblind Friend"	Hoyt Axton	3:52
3.	"Who Needs Ya'"	Byrom, Kay	2:59
4.	"Earschplittenloudenboomer"	Byrom	5:00
5.	"Hippo Stomp"	Byrom, Kay	5:43

== Personnel ==
=== Steppenwolf ===
- John Kay – lead vocals, rhythm guitar, harmonica
- Larry Byrom – lead guitar, backing vocals
- Goldy McJohn – Hammond organ, piano
- George Biondo – bass, backing vocals, lead vocals on "Fat Jack" and co-lead vocals on "Foggy Mental Breakdown" and "Who Needs Ya'"
- Jerry Edmonton – drums

=== Technical ===
- Richard Podolor – producer, engineer
- Bill Cooper – engineer
- Tom Gundelfinger – photography
- Gary Burden – art direction, liner design, artwork

== Charts ==
Chart (1970–1971)	Peak position
Australia (Kent Music Report)	26
US Billboard 200	19

Singles

Year	Single	Chart	Position
1970	"Who Needs Ya'"	Billboard Hot 100	54
1971	"Snowblind Friend"	Billboard Hot 100	60
