= For Ladies Only =

Studio album by Steppenwolf
- Released: November 1971
- Recorded: November 24, 1970 – May 30, 1971
- Studios: American Recording Co., Studio City, California
- Genre: Rock
- Length: 45:19
- Label: Dunhill
- Producer: Richard Podolor

Steppenwolf chronology
Steppenwolf 7 (1970)	For Ladies Only (1971)	Gold: Their Great Hits (1971)

Singles from For Ladies Only
- 1. "Ride With Me" Released: June 1971; 2. "For Ladies Only" Released: 6 October 1971

Professional ratings
Review scores
Source	Rating
AllMusic	2/5 stars
Christgau's Record Guide	C+
Rolling Stone	(mixed)

For Ladies Only is the sixth studio album by Canadian-American rock band Steppenwolf. The album was released in November 1971, by Dunhill Records. It is a political concept album mainly about feminism, but with several more conventional songs about romance, as well, both unusual themes for Steppenwolf. Some critics saw the album as sexist, citing the lyrics of the songs and a photo of a car shaped like a penis alongside the Hollywood Walk of Fame in the gatefold. The album had the band hinting toward the progressive rock movement that was popular at the time with more complex arrangements and sophisticated keyboard playing, particularly on the title track. Like their previous album, it was accompanied by two minor hit singles, which fell just short of the top 40.

Lead guitarist Kent Henry from Blues Image replaced Larry Byrom prior to recording this album. The album was Steppenwolf's last of new material released prior to the band's initial breakup in February 1972.

== Reception ==
The album charted at number 54 on the Billboard 200. The album was not well received by reviewers, with Robert Christgau writing, "These fellows certainly have lost their hip aura..." AllMusic's Joe Viglione writes, "In retrospect, For Ladies Only remains a neat artifact of a band who might've been called on to create too much too soon."

Record World said that the title track "is solidly in [Steppenwolf's] hard-driving, hard-rocking tradition."

== Track listing ==
Side one
No.	Title	Writer(s)	Length
1.	"For Ladies Only"	Jerry Edmonton, Kent Henry, John Kay, Goldy McJohn	9:13
2.	"I'm Asking"	Edmonton, McJohn	4:25
3.	"Shackles and Chains"	Kay	4:57
4.	"Tenderness"	Mars Bonfire	4:51

Side two
No.	Title	Writer(s)	Length
1.	"The Night Time's for You"	Bonfire, Morgan Cavett	2:56
2.	"Jaded Strumpet"	Edmonton	4:40
3.	"Sparkle Eyes"	George Biondo, Kay	4:29
4.	"Black Pit"	Henry, McJohn	3:46
5.	"Ride With Me"	Bonfire	3:15
6.	"In Hopes of a Garden"	Biondo	2:01

The LP jacket was of the gatefold type. Outside of the unfolded jacket, front side to the right

Inside the gatefold

== Personnel ==
=== Steppenwolf ===
- John Kay – vocals, guitar
- Kent Henry – lead guitar
- George Biondo – vocals, bass guitar
- Goldy McJohn – Hammond organ, piano
- Jerry Edmonton – drums

=== Technical ===
- Richard Podolor – producer
- Bill Cooper – engineer
- Tom Gundelfinger – photography, design

== Charts ==
Album

Year	Chart	Position
1971	Billboard 200	54

Singles

Year	Single	Chart	Position
1971	"For Ladies Only"	Billboard Hot 100	64
1971	"Ride with Me"	Billboard Hot 100	52
