= Ron Hurst (musician) =

American musician

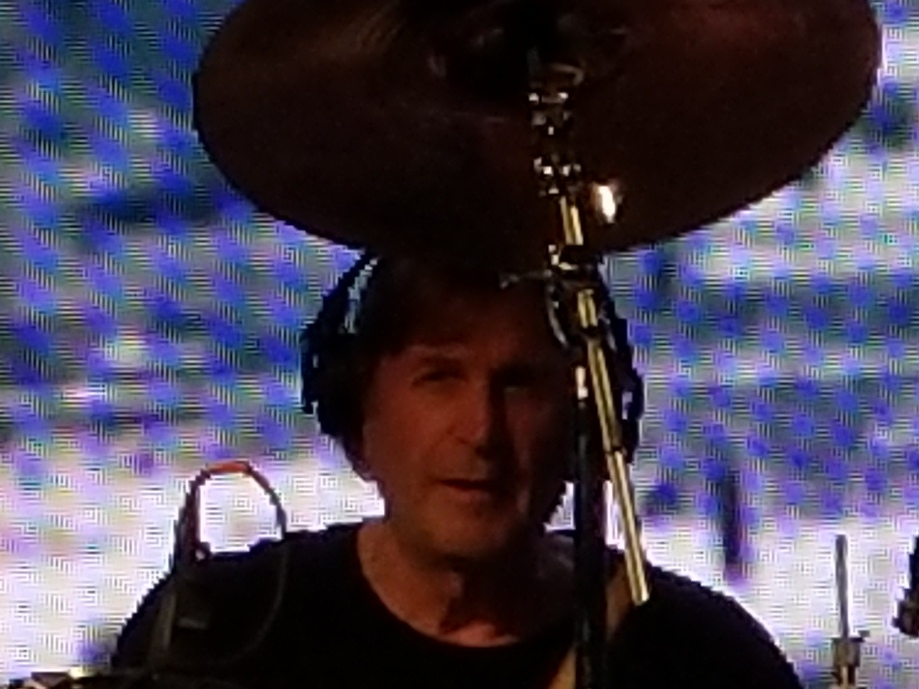
- Hurst performing with Steppenwolf in 2018

Background information
- Occupations: Musician; Songwriter; Drummer
- Instruments: Drums; percussion

Ron Hurst (born c. 1950) is an American musician. Since 1984 he has been the drummer for American rock band Steppenwolf. He resides in Hillsboro, Oregon, in the Portland area where he teaches drums at a studio. Hurst moved from Nashville, Tennessee, to the Hillsboro area in 2003. He grew up in Holyoke, Massachusetts before moving to New York City and Nashville. His daughter is in a band called In Retrograde. In addition to drums, he has also done vocal work with the band.
