= Steppenwolf (Steppenwolf album) =

Studio album by Steppenwolf
- Released: January 29, 1968
- Recorded: Fall 1967
- Studios: American Recording, Studio City, California
- Genres: Blues rock; hard rock; psychedelic rock
- Length: 46:10
- Label: ABC Dunhill
- Producer: Gabriel Mekler

Steppenwolf chronology
Steppenwolf (1968)	The Second (1968)

Singles from Steppenwolf
- 1. "A Girl I Knew" Released: October 1967; 2. "Sookie Sookie" Released: February 1968; 3. "Born to Be Wild" Released: May 1968

Steppenwolf is the debut studio album by Canadian-American rock band Steppenwolf, released on January 29, 1968, on ABC Dunhill Records. It includes songs written by band members and songs written by others such as the Willie Dixon blues classic "Hoochie Coochie Man", retitled "Hootchie Kootchie Man".

The album reached number six on the Billboard albums chart. "Born to Be Wild", which was released as a single, peaked at number two on Billboard's Hot 100. It and "The Pusher" were included in the 1969 film Easy Rider.

Professional ratings
Review scores
Source	Rating
AllMusic	4/5 stars
The Daily Vault	B+
Rolling Stone	(positive)
Sputnikmusic	4.0/5 stars

== Track listing ==
Details are taken from the original Dunhill album; other releases may have different information.

Side one
No.	Title	Writer(s)	Length
1.	"Sookie Sookie"	Don Covay	3:09
2.	"Everybody's Next One"	John Kay, Gabriel Mekler	2:53
3.	"Berry Rides Again"	Kay	2:45
4.	"Hoochie Coochie Man"	Willie Dixon	5:07
5.	"Born to Be Wild"	Mars Bonfire	3:28
6.	"Your Wall's Too High"	Kay	5:40

Side two
No.	Title	Writer(s)	Length
7.	"Desperation"	Kay	5:45
8.	"The Pusher"	Hoyt Axton	5:43
9.	"A Girl I Knew"	Kay, Morgan Cavett	2:35
10.	"Take What You Need"	Kay, Mekler	3:28
11.	"The Ostrich"	Kay	5:43
Total length:			46:10

== Personnel ==
Steppenwolf

- John Kay – lead vocals, guitars, harmonica
- Michael Monarch – guitars, backing vocals
- Goldy McJohn – organ, piano, Wurlitzer electric piano
- Rushton Moreve – bass guitar, backing vocals
- Jerry Edmonton – drums, backing vocals, percussion

Technical

- Gabriel Mekler – producer
- Bill Cooper – engineer
- Richard Podolor – engineer
- Gary Burden – art direction, cover design
- Tom Gundelfinger – photography
- Henry Diltz – photography

== Charts ==
Chart (1968)	Peak position
Canada Top Albums/CDs (RPM)	1
US Billboard 200	6
