= Skullduggery (album) =

Studio album by Steppenwolf
- Released: May 1976
- Recorded: January 1976
- Genre: Hard rock; acid rock
- Length: 34:26
- Label: Epic
- Producer: Steppenwolf

Steppenwolf chronology
Hour of the Wolf (1975)	Skullduggery (1976)	Wolftracks (1982)

Skullduggery is the ninth studio album by Canadian-American rock band Steppenwolf. The album was released in May 1976, by Epic Records. It was the third of four released by Epic Records, and the last to feature keyboardist Wayne Cook, who left to join Player in 1977. It is also the last album to be released, under the Steppenwolf name before the group rebranded themselves as John Kay & Steppenwolf.

== Track listing ==
Side one
No.	Title	Writer(s)	Length
1.	"Skullduggery"	Bobby Cochran	5:17
2.	"(I'm a) Road Runner"	Lamont Dozier, Edward Holland	3:54
3.	"Rock and Roll Song"	Valdy Horsdal	3:09
4.	"Train of Thought"	Alan O'Day	4:43

Side two
No.	Title	Writer(s)	Length
5.	"Life Is a Gamble"	Cochran, Harry Garfield	3:24
6.	"Pass It On"	Jean Watt	4:46
7.	"Sleep"	George Biondo	3:47
8.	"Lip Service"	Biondo, Cochran, Wayne Cook	5:26

== Personnel ==
=== Steppenwolf ===
- John Kay – lead vocals, guitar
- Bobby Cochran – guitar, vocals
- George Biondo – bass guitar, vocals
- Wayne Cook – keyboards
- Jerry Edmonton – drums, percussion, backing vocals

=== Technical ===
- Steppenwolf – producers
- Mike Reese – mastering
- Ed Bannon – engineer
- Lorrie Sullivan – design, photography
- Randy Nicklaus – mixing engineer
- Jerry Edmonton – art direction
