= Richard Podolor =

American musician, record producer, and songwriter (1936–2022)

- Also known as: Dickie Podolor; Richie Allen
- Born: Richard Allen Podolor; January 7, 1936; Los Angeles, California, U.S.
- Died: March 9, 2022 (aged 86)
- Occupations: Musician; engineer; record producer
- Instrument: Guitar
- Years active: 1956–2000s
- Label: Decca
- Formerly of: The Pets

Richard Allen Podolor (January 7, 1936 – March 9, 2022) was an American record producer, songwriter, and musician. His career started as a session musician in the 1950s, and he was best known as the producer of Three Dog Night.

== Life and career ==
Podolor was born in Los Angeles on January 7 1936, the son of Ethel Podolor (1909–2015) and Michael Podolor (1907–2000). He was of Jewish descent, and had an older brother, Donald. He learned guitar as a child. He became a session musician at the age of 16, and played on Bonnie Guitar's hit, "Dark Moon", in 1956. He made some recordings as Dickie Podolor in the late 1950s, and toured as a member of the Pets, a group that also included session musicians Plas Johnson and Earl Palmer. He played on the Pets' 1958 hit "Cha Hua Hua". His success as a musician enabled his family to open a recording studio, the American Recording Company, initially run by his brother Don Podolor. Together with drummer Sandy Nelson, Richie Podolor recorded a demo of "Teen Beat", but the song was then taken up and recorded by other musicians with Nelson, becoming a hit in 1959. Because Podolor was not given a co-writing credit for "Teen Beat", Nelson later credited him with co-writing some of his later recordings, including his 1961 hit "Let There Be Drums".

Podolor released recordings for Imperial Records in the early 1960s, using the name Richie Allen (or, on one single, Dickie Allen). His 1960 single "Stranger from Durango" reached No. 90 on the Billboard Hot 100. His early 1960s albums as the leader of Richie Allen and the Pacific Surfers featured top Los Angeles session musicians including René Hall, Tommy Tedesco, Plas Johnson, Lincoln Mayorga, and Sandy Nelson. Two of these Imperial albums, The Rising Surf and Surfer's Slide, were later reissued on CD.

He continued to record under his own name as well as working as a session musician. By the mid-1960s, he increasingly worked as an audio engineer as well as a musician, on recordings by the Monkees, the Turtles, the Electric Prunes, the Grateful Dead, Donovan, and others. He produced two studio albums for Steppenwolf, engineered all their early hits including "Born to Be Wild", and produced Three Dog Night's "Mama Told Me Not to Come" and "Joy to the World", leading to his work on all subsequent albums by Three Dog Night. Other acts with whom he worked as a producer included Alice Cooper, Iron Butterfly, the Dillards, Chris Hillman, and Black Oak Arkansas.

Podolor passed in his sleep on March 9, 2022, at the age of 86. His partner, Bill Cooper, a record producer and engineer who worked on several albums with Podolor, survives him, as does his brother Donald, niece Sheryl, and nephews Robert and James. He is interred at the Eden Memorial Park in Los Angeles, California.

== American Recording Co. ==
In 1959, the Polodor family established the American Recording Co. recording studios in the Studio City neighborhood of Los Angeles, California. The studio operated at this location until 1982, then reopened in Calabasas in 1984, where it is still in operation today.

== Discography (producer) ==
=== Three Dog Night ===
- Captured Live at the Forum (1969) (ABC-Dunhill/MCA)
- It Ain't Easy (1970) (ABC-Dunhill/MCA)
- Naturally (1970) (ABC-Dunhill/MCA)
- Golden Bisquits (1971) (ABC-Dunhill/MCA) – co-produced with Gabriel Mekler
- Harmony (1971) (ABC-Dunhill/MCA)
- Seven Separate Fools (1972) (ABC-Dunhill/MCA)
- Cyan (1973) (ABC-Dunhill/MCA)
- Around the World with Three Dog Night (1973) (ABC-Dunhill/MCA)
- Joy to the World: Their Greatest Hits (1974) (ABC-Dunhill/MCA) – co-producer with Gabriel Mekler and Jimmy Ienner
- The Best of 3 Dog Night (1982) (MCA) – co-producer with Gabriel Mekler and Jimmy Ienner
- It's a Jungle (1983) (Passport)

=== Iron Butterfly ===
- Live (1970) (Atco)
- Metamorphosis (1970) (Atco)

=== Blues Image ===
- "Ride Captain Ride" (1970) (Atco)
- Open (1970) (Atco)
- Red White & Blues Image (1970) (Atco)

=== The Dillards ===
- Roots and Branches (1972) (Anthem Records)

=== Jellyroll ===
- Jellyroll (1971) (Kapp US, MCA UK and Germany)

=== The Souther-Hillman-Furay Band ===
- The Souther-Hillman-Furay Band (1974) (Asylum)

=== Chris Hillman ===
- Like a Hurricane (1998) (Sugar Hill)

=== 20/20 ===
- Look Out! (1981)

=== Alice Cooper ===
- Special Forces (1981) (Warner Bros.)

=== Phil Seymour ===
- Phil Seymour (1981)
- Phil Seymour 2 (1982)
- “Prince of Power Pop” (2017)

=== Dwight Twilley ===
- The Luck (recorded 1994, released 2001)

=== Steppenwolf ===
- Steppenwolf 7 (ABC/Dunhill) (producer) (1970)
- Gold: Their Great Hits (ABC/Dunhill) (co-producer w/Bill Cooper) and (producer) (1970)
- For Ladies Only (ABC/Dunhill) (producer) (1971)
- 16 Greatest Hits (ABC/Dunhill) (co-producer w/Bill Cooper) and (producer) (1973)

=== John Kay & Steppenwolf ===
- Paradox (Attic) (1984)

=== Alcatrazz ===
- Dangerous Games (1986) (EMI Records)

=== London ===
- Playa Del Rock (NOISE/BMG Records) (1990)

== Solo career ==
- 4 Singles (Jamie Record Company) (1958)
