= Slow Flux =

Studio album by Steppenwolf
- Released: August 30, 1974
- Recorded: 1974
- Studio: John Kay's Studio
- Genre: Hard rock; acid rock
- Length: 45:33
- Label: Mums (US)/Epic (International)
- Producer: Steppenwolf

Steppenwolf chronology
16 Greatest Hits (1973)	Slow Flux (1974)	Hour of the Wolf (1975)

Singles from Slow Flux
- 1. "Straight Shootin' Woman" Released: August 9, 1974; 2. "Get Into the Wind" Released: November 1974; 3. "Smokey Factory Blues" Released: January 1975

Slow Flux is the seventh studio album by Canadian-American rock band Steppenwolf. The album was released in August 1974, by Epic Records. In the US it was released on the Mums Records label, a short-lived CBS Records subsidiary. It was the first of three albums the band created after reforming in 1974 before they disbanded again in 1976. "Straight Shootin' Woman" was the last Steppenwolf song to chart on the Billboard magazine Top 40. The song "Children of the Night" notably posits that the hippie movement at this time had died, and president Richard Nixon is referred to as "the fool who believed that wrong is right".

Guitarist and composer Bobby Cochran replaced Kent Henry on lead guitar in this reformed lineup, until the 1976 breakup. Cochran is the late Eddie Cochran's nephew.

This was the last Steppenwolf album that Goldy McJohn would play on. He was sacked from the band by bandleader John Kay in 1975. A horn section also played on the album.

Professional ratings
Review scores
Source	Rating
AllMusic	(not rated) link
Džuboks	mixed

== Track listing ==
Side one
No.	Title	Writer(s)	Length
1.	"Gang War Blues"	Goldy McJohn, Jerry Edmonton, John Kay, Kim Fowley	4:52
2.	"Children of Night"	Kay	5:11
3.	"Justice Don't Be Slow"	Kay, Joseph B. Richie	5:00
4.	"Get into the Wind"	Bobby Cochran, Casey Van Beek	3:00
5.	"Jeraboah"	Jack Conrad	5:41

Side two
No.	Title	Writer(s)	Length
6.	"Straight Shootin' Woman"	Edmonton	4:04
7.	"Smokey Factory Blues"	Albert Hammond, Mike Hazlewood	4:09
8.	"Morning Blue"	George Biondo	4:12
9.	"A Fool's Fantasy"	McJohn	3:37
10.	"Fishin' in the Dark"	Kay	5:47

== Personnel ==
=== Steppenwolf ===
- John Kay – lead vocals, rhythm guitar
- Goldy McJohn – keyboards, backing vocals
- Bobby Cochran – lead guitar, backing vocals
- George Biondo – bass, backing vocals
- Jerry Edmonton – drums, percussion, backing vocals

=== Additional musicians ===
- Charles Black, Don Ellis, Gil Rathel, John Rosenberg, Sam Falzone – horns
- Skip Konte – Chamberlin (track 10)

=== Technical ===
- Steppenwolf – producers
- Ed Bannon – engineer
- Arnie Acosta – mastering
- Jerry Edmonton – art direction, design
- Tom Gundelfinger – photography (front cover)
- Ed Caraeff – photography (back cover & sleeve)

== Charts ==
Album - Billboard (United States)

Year	Chart	Position
1974	Billboard 200	47

Singles - Billboard (United States)

Year	Single	Chart	Position
1974	"Straight Shootin' Woman"	Billboard Hot 100	29
1974	"Smokey Factory Blues"	Billboard Bubbling Under the Hot 100	108
