= The Pusher =

1968 song performed by Steppenwolf

Single by Steppenwolf

from the album Steppenwolf
- B-side: "Your Wall's Too High"
- Released: January 1968
- Recorded: Fall 1967; American Recording Co. Studio; (Calabasas, California, United States)
- Genre: Blues rock, acid rock
- Length: 5:43
- Label: ABC Dunhill
- Songwriter: Hoyt Axton
- Producer: Gabriel Mekler

Steppenwolf singles chronology
"Born to Be Wild" (1968)	"The Pusher" (1968)	"Magic Carpet Ride" (1968)

"The Pusher" is a rock song written by Hoyt Axton in 1963, made popular by the 1969 movie Easy Rider which used Steppenwolf's version to accompany the opening scenes showing drug trafficking.

The lyrics of the song distinguish between a dealer in drugs such as marijuana—who "will sell you lots of sweet dreams"—and a pusher of hard drugs such as heroin—a "monster" who does not care "if you live or if you die".

== Steppenwolf version ==
The song was made popular when rock band Steppenwolf released the song on their 1968 album Steppenwolf.

Organist Goldy McJohn, who recorded the original Steppenwolf version, said the version that appears on Early Steppenwolf performed by The Sparrows, a predecessor band to Steppenwolf in 1967 at the Matrix came about when singer John Kay and Jerry Edmonton were late for a performance:

Nick and Mars and me started that long version of the Pusher. John and Jerry's flight was late one night at the Avalon Ballroom, so we started and then we perfected it at the "Arc" in Sausalito on New Year's Eve in 1966.

== Other versions ==
- Songwriter Hoyt Axton did not place "The Pusher" on one of his albums until he included it on his 1971 Capitol LP Joy to the World. His version of the song was originally released in May 1969 on a various-artists mail-order album called First Vibration.
- Nina Simone included a soulful version of this song on her 1974 album It Is Finished and on the RCA "Novus Series 70" titled Nina Simone: The Blues. Originally recorded June 1971.
- Blind Melon released a version of "The Pusher" on their album Nico, released 1996.
- The Flaming Lips & Deap Vally's collaboration dubbed Deap Lips released a cover of "The Pusher" on their 2020 self-titled album, Deap Lips. It included slightly different lyrics from the Steppenwolf version.
- The song has also been covered by Monkeywrench, Young Flowers, Black League, The Substitutes, UFO, Helix, Negative Space, Emerson Parris, Gideon Smith & the Dixie Damned, Left Lane Cruiser, and Sons of Otis.
- The band Cowboy Mouth covered "The Pusher" on the 1998 movie Soundtrack for the movie Half Baked.
- In 2024, Slash covered "The Pusher" on his blues-oriented album Orgy of the Damned. The rendition included Chris Robinson on vocals and harmonica.

== Publication ==
Axton sometimes recalled in his shows how he discovered, many years after "The Pusher" had been a hit, that the song had never been published. He asked his mother, Mae Boren Axton, who ran his publishing company, how it had been missed. His mother told him she had refused to publish it because of the "swearing" in the song. Hoyt told his mother, "Mom, it's a biblical curse! God... Damn the pusher man!" She said, "Oh, now I get it!" and published the song.
