= Magic Carpet Ride (Steppenwolf song) =

1968 single by Steppenwolf

- Cover of the 1968 Netherlands single

Single by Steppenwolf

from the album The Second
- B-side: "Sookie Sookie"
- Released: September 1968
- Recorded: 1968
- Genre: Acid rock; hard rock; psychedelic pop
- Length: 4:30 (album version); 2:55 (single version)
- Label: ABC Dunhill
- Songwriters: Rushton Moreve; John Kay
- Producer: Gabriel Mekler

Steppenwolf singles chronology
| "The Pusher" (1968) | "Magic Carpet Ride" (1968) | "Rock Me" (1969) |

Music video
- "Magic Carpet Ride" on YouTube

"Magic Carpet Ride" is a rock song written by John Kay and Rushton Moreve from the Canadian-American hard rock band Steppenwolf. The song was initially released in 1968 on the album The Second. It was the lead single from that album, peaking at number three in the US, and staying in the charts for 16 weeks, longer than any other Steppenwolf song.

The 45 rpm version is an edit of the album version, and contains a different vocal take on the first verse. Despite the single's popularity, the album version enjoyed heavy airplay on FM radio and is still the preferred version on most classic rock stations, as well as the one most commonly included on compilations and in popular media.

== Writing and recording ==
When preparing to record the band's second album, The Second, bassist Rushton Moreve came up with a "bouncy riff". Band member Jerry Edmonton's brother, Mars Bonfire, started playing guitar, and the band developed the riff. For the introduction, guitarist Michael Monarch created feedback which was spliced on to the beginning of the band's recording. John Kay had recently bought a new top-quality hi-fi system, and started writing lyrics "about how great our new stereo system sounded," adding imagery about making a wish. After completing the lyrics and recording the vocal track, Kay overdubbed a falsetto, and sound engineer Bill Cooper spliced an extra chorus at the end of the track. While denying that the song was about drug experiences, Kay did admit to the Wall Street Journal in 2016 that "I may have smoked a joint" the night he and Monarch got the idea for the song. Kay also alleged the lyrics went beyond referencing the quality of the new stereo and were also a reference to his relationship with his wife Jutta and envisioning that he had made a wish with Aladdin's lamp.

Billboard described the single as a "pulsating rocker" with similar sales potential to Steppenwolf's earlier single, "Born to Be Wild". Record World predicted that "the young set will flip for [the song]."

== In popular culture ==
In the fictional Star Trek universe, the song is played by the originator of warp flight, Zefram Cochrane, during launch sequences for good luck. Cochrane uses the song for any test flights and plays the song during the first warp flight, with the crew of the Enterprise, as featured in the movie Star Trek: First Contact.

== Charts ==
=== Weekly charts ===
| Chart (1968–1969) | Peak position |
|---|---|
| Australia (Kent Music Report) | 12 |
| Austria | 12 |
| Canada RPM Top Singles | 1 |
| Germany | 11 |
| New Zealand (Listener) | 5 |
| US Billboard Hot 100 | 3 |
| US Cash Box Top 100 | 2 |

=== Year-end charts ===
| Chart (1968) | Rank |
|---|---|
| Canada (RPM Top Singles) | 45 |
| US Billboard Hot 100 | 62 |
| US Cash Box Top 100 | 60 |

== Cover versions ==
- A 1978 version by the South African group Buffalo spent 12 weeks on the Springbok Radio charts, peaking at number five.
- Billy Paul on his 1971 album Going East covered the song.
- Grandmaster Flash and the Furious Five, on the 1988 album, On the Strength.
