= Rushton Moreve =

American musician (1948–1981)

- Also known as: Rushton Moreve
- Born: John Rushton Morey; November 6, 1948; Los Angeles, California, U.S.
- Died: July 1, 1981 (aged 32) Los Angeles, California, U.S.
- Genres: Acid rock, hard rock, psychedelic rock, Proto-metal
- Occupations: Musician, songwriter
- Instrument: Bass guitar
- Years active: 1967–1981
- Labels: Dunhill, MCA
- Formerly of: Steppenwolf

Rushton Moreve (born John Rushton Morey; November 6, 1948 – July 1, 1981) was an American bass guitarist best known for his work with the rock band Steppenwolf from 1967 to 1968 and again in 1978. According to singer John Kay, he was an intuitive bassist with a melodic style that brought a non-commercial sound to the band, a technique exemplified on the hit he co-wrote with Kay, "Magic Carpet Ride".

Moreve's early influence was essential in creating the unique musical style for which Steppenwolf became famous. He joined the band in 1967 and performed on their debut album, Steppenwolf, which was composed of covers and songs written by Kay. His influence was heavier on the follow-up, The Second, his final album with Steppenwolf. He was killed in 1981 in an auto accident.

== Biography ==
=== Steppenwolf ===
Moreve joined the band in 1967, having responded to a "Bass Player Wanted" notice posted at Wallich's Music City at Vine and Sunset. One of Steppenwolf's most popular songs was "Magic Carpet Ride", a song that evolved out of something Moreve had been working on – a simple but catchy three-note bass line. While the band was recording its second album, Moreve played his song for the band. The band liked it. Writing credits for "Magic Carpet Ride" were assigned to John Kay and Rushton Moreve. This was the only Steppenwolf song Moreve received credit for writing. It was released on the album Steppenwolf the Second.

=== Departure ===
Rushton Moreve was eventually fired from the group in 1968 for missing gigs after he became afraid to return to Los Angeles, convinced by his girlfriend that it was going to be leveled by an earthquake and fall into the sea. He was eventually replaced by former Sparrows bassist, Nick St. Nicholas. He was awarded his gold record for The Second when one of his producers recognized him on the street years later. In 1978, he performed with a new Steppenwolf lineup with ex-Steppenwolf guitarist Kent Henry, who played on the For Ladies Only album . This was a separate incarnation from the lineup with Nick St. Nicholas. Moreve eventually left this version of Steppenwolf when he and Henry had a major falling out.

=== Death ===
Moreve died in 1981 from injuries sustained in an automobile accident in Sun Valley, Los Angeles, California.

Preceded by Original	Steppenwolf Bass Guitarist; 1967-1968	Succeeded by Nick St. Nicholas
