= Bobby Cochran =

American musician and songwriter

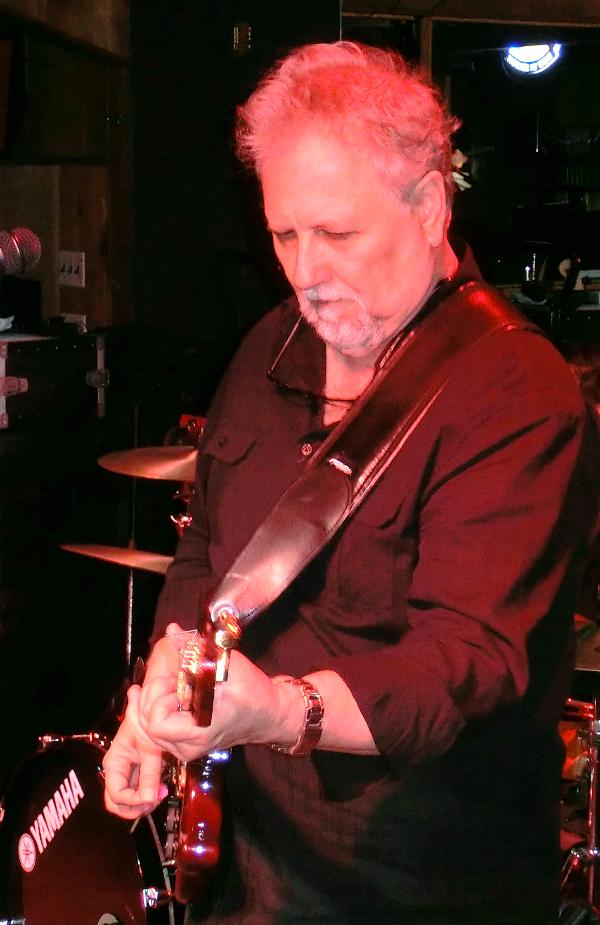

Background information
- Born: 1950 (age 75–76)
- Genres: Rock, rockabilly, classic rock, blues, surf, acoustic, fingerstyle
- Occupations: Guitarist, singer, songwriter, record producer
- Instrument: Guitar
- Years active: 1960s–present
- Formerly of: Steppenwolf, The Flying Burrito Brothers, Bobby and the Midnites, Thee Midniters, The Knack
- Website: bobbycochran.com

Bobby Cochran (born 1950) is an American guitarist, singer, songwriter, and record producer. He has worked with many bands, including Steppenwolf, the Flying Burrito Brothers, Leon Russell, and Bob Weir's band Bobby and the Midnites. He was inducted into the international Rockabilly Hall of Fame along with his uncle, Eddie Cochran on July 1, 2017.

== Biography ==
Bobby Cochran started taking guitar lessons from his father when he was twelve years old. Bobby is the nephew of musician Eddie Cochran. Eddie was a huge idol to Bobby Cochran and his style influenced Bobby's playing at an early age. Bobby has stated that as a child he would have lucid dreams of Eddie teaching him how to play the guitar, and that his playing benefited from hearing Eddie's unreleased music.

Before Bobby Cochran joined Steppenwolf, and later the Flying Burrito Brothers, he also played guitar for the psych/garage group The Knack. Cochran also played guitar through several incarnations of Thee Midniters, a very popular East L.A. band. Bobby later co-founded Bobby and the Midnites as a nod to his time with Thee Midniters.

The international Rockabilly Hall of Fame inducted Bobby and Eddie Cochran at the same time, on July 1, 2017. The president thinks it's the first time it's ever happened that two family members have been inducted on the same day.

Bobby Cochran has authored Three Steps to Heaven: The Eddie Cochran Story with Susan Van Hecke.

Cochran is a successful music producer, and has produced four albums for English guitarist Adrian Legg, two of which won Guitar Player magazine's Best Acoustic Album of the Year for two consecutive years.

In 2016, Cochran formed Somethin' Else!, a new band with Brian Hodgson and Mike Bell. They toured in Europe.

== Discography ==
Bobby Cochran has contributed to albums by many different musical artists. Below is a partial discography.

- Slow Flux – Steppenwolf – 1974
- Hour of the Wolf – Steppenwolf – 1975
- Skullduggery – Steppenwolf – 1975
- Bobby and the Midnites – Bobby and the Midnites – 1981
- Where the Beat Meets the Street – Bobby and the Midnites – 1984
- Private Edition – Bobby Cochran – 1998
