= Michael Monarch =

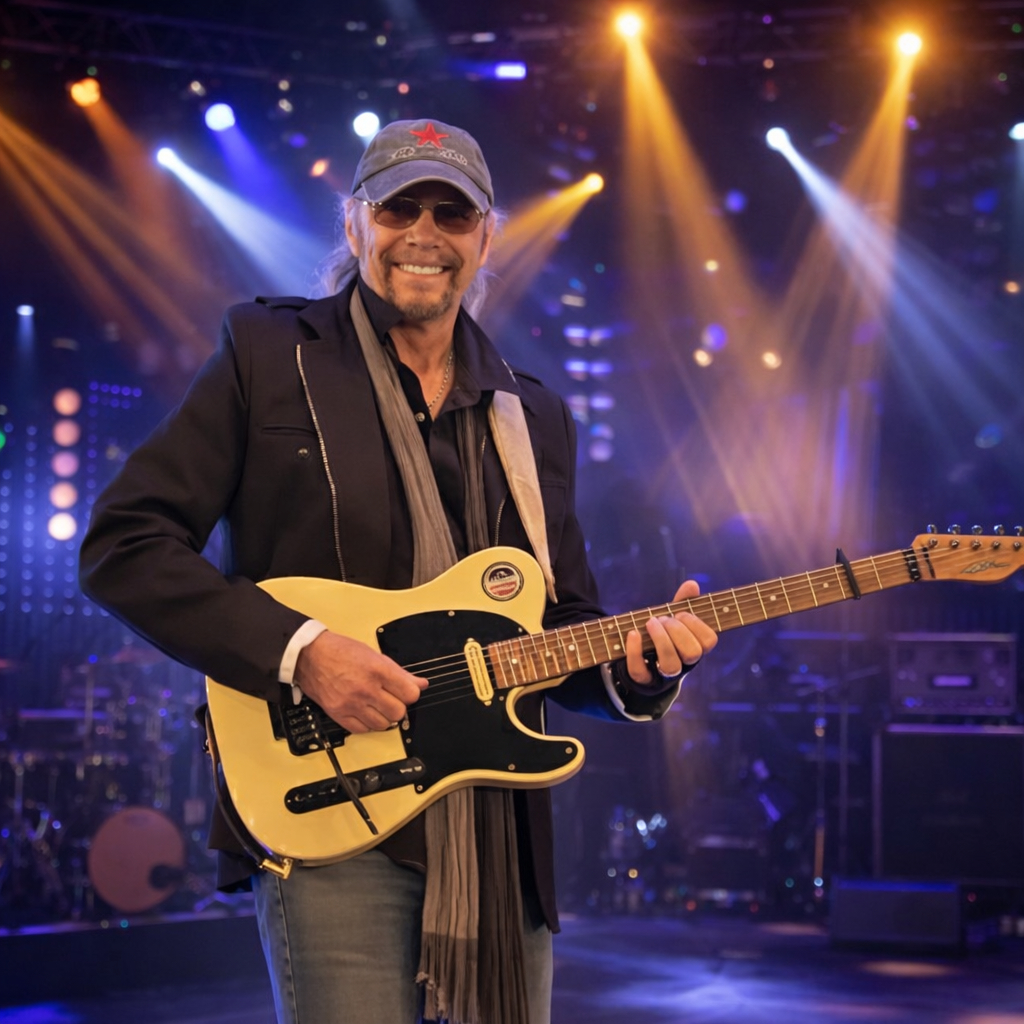
- Monarch in 2026

Background information
- Born: July 5, 1950 (age 76); Los Angeles, U.S.
- Genres: Hard rock; heavy metal; blues rock; rock and roll; jazz rock
- Occupations: Musician; songwriter; producer
- Instruments: Guitar; keyboards
- Years active: 1967–present
- Website: michaelmonarch.com

Michael Monarch (born July 5, 1950) is an American guitarist. He is best known for his work with the band Steppenwolf.

Monarch was born in Los Angeles. As the original lead guitarist with Steppenwolf (1967 through most of 1969), he played on all their hits, including "Born to Be Wild", "Magic Carpet Ride", and "Rock Me", all while still a teenager. He also played on Janis Joplin's album I Got Dem Ol' Kozmic Blues Again Mama! and was a member of the Michael Des Barres-fronted band Detective. Monarch also worked with Roger Glover of Deep Purple, Andy Fraser of Free, Chris Hillman of The Byrds and numerous others.

Early Years - Monarch's first instrument was piano. He took piano lessons for several years during childhood. He added lessons on drums during his early teens and started playing drums in local bands. He picked up guitar on the side and is completely self-taught on that instrument. Hanging out in the mid 60's in Hollywood and The Sunset Strip, he began playing guitar in local bands.

Steppenwolf - 1967 - Monarch met the members of the band Sparrow (which was in the process of breaking up) at the infamous Tropicana Motel in West Hollywood and seeing them play their last gig at The Galaxy night club on Sunset near the Whisky, he was asked to replace their guitarist. While rehearsing in a small one car garage in West Hollywood they were discovered by a young producer for Dunhill Records, Gabriel Mekler, who brought them to the label and suggested the name change to Steppenwolf after the Herman Hesse book.

1970’s – After leaving Steppenwolf, Michael met Jon Hyde and recorded one album for Romar Records (MGM) as the band Hokus Pokus. Scott Thurston (later of Tom Petty and the Heartbreakers) played keys. The band broke up after the album release and Michael and Jon both moved to London, England around 1973 -74. They put together a band there and were backed by RSO Records with a contingency deal. When that band didn’t fully materialize, Jon went back to the US and Michael stayed and worked with Roger Glover on various projects he was producing at the time. When a year had passed Michael went back to the US. In California he hooked up with Michael Des Barres who was putting a group together. When the lineup was set they signed with Led Zepplin’s Swan Song label and the band was called Detective with the two Michaels, Jon Hyde on drums, Bobby Pickett on bass and Tony Kaye (original member of Yes) on keyboards. They released two albums – Detective and It Takes One To Know One.

The 90’s and Beyond - Michael began amateur dancing West Coast Swing in the mid 90’s and in the late 90’s won some titles in California. In 1996 he got together with ex-Steppenwolf bassist Nick St. Nicholas for the creation of an “all-star” band called The World Classic Rockers. That band has continued for 30 years as of 2026. Members of WCR have included: Randy Meisner (Eagles), Denny Laine (Moody Blues/Wings), Spencer Davis, Aynsley Dunbar (Journey), and musicians from Toto (Bobby Kimball & Fergie Frederiksen), Steppenwolf (Nick St. Nicholas), Foreigner (Ron Wikso), Santana (Alex Ligertwood & Greg Walker), Boston (Fran Cosmo), Kansas (John Elefante) and Lynyrd Skynyrd (Randall Hall).

Monarch also performs locally in Florida as "Michael Monarch - an evening of music and conversation."

== Discography ==
- Steppenwolf - Steppenwolf (1968, Dunhill) U.S. #6, U.K. #59, certified gold
- Steppenwolf - The Second (1968, Dunhill) U.S. #3, certified gold
- Steppenwolf - At Your Birthday Party (1969, Dunhill) U.S. #7, certified gold
- Janis Joplin - I Got Dem Ol' Kozmic Blues Again Mama! (1969, Columbia) U.S. #5, certified platinum — uncredited
- Hokus Pokus - Hokus Pokus (1972, Romar)
- Detective - Detective (1977, Swan Song)
- Detective - It Takes One to Know One (1977, Swan Song)
- Detective - Live from the Atlantic Studios (1978, Swan Song)
- Michael Monarch - It Feels So Real (2001, MSR)
- Michael Monarch - Guitar Bazaar (2001, MSR)
- Michael Monarch - The Other Side of the Tracks (2002, MSR)
- Michael Monarch - MM3 (2006, MSR)
- Peyton-Monarch - Lonesome Highway (2021, MSR)
- Michael Monarch - Playtime (2025, MSR)
