= Steppenwolf (band) =

Canadian–American rock group

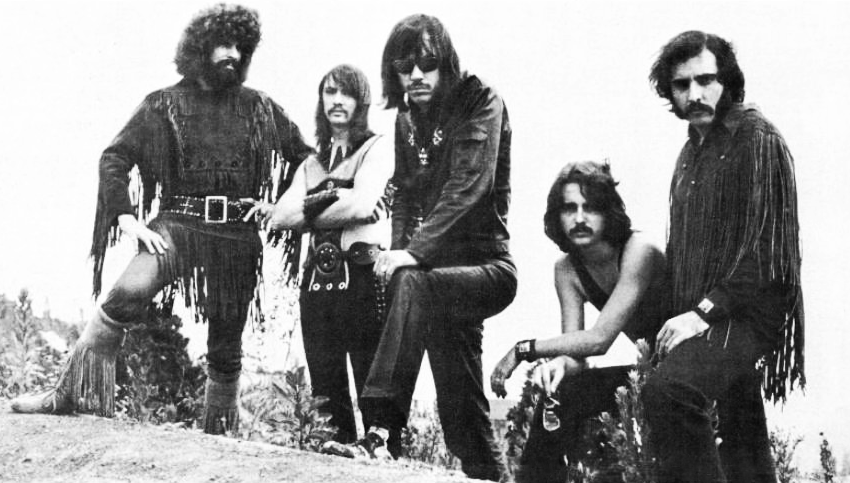
- Steppenwolf in 1971 (L–R: Goldy McJohn, Jerry Edmonton, John Kay, Larry Byrom, George Biondo)

Background information
- Also known as: John Kay & Steppenwolf (1980-2018)
- Origin: Los Angeles, California, U.S.
- Genres: Psychedelic rock; blues rock; acid rock; hard rock; heavy metal; garage rock
- Years active: 1967–1972; 1974–1976; 1980–2018
- Labels: ABC Dunhill; Mums; Epic; MCA
- Spinoff of: The Sparrows
- Past members: List
- Website: steppenwolf.com

Steppenwolf (later known as John Kay & Steppenwolf) was an American/Canadian rock band formed in Los Angeles in 1967. The group was founded by singer/rhythm guitarist John Kay, keyboardist Goldy McJohn and drummer Jerry Edmonton, all formerly of the Canadian band the Sparrows. Guitarist Michael Monarch and bassist Rushton Moreve were recruited via notices placed in Los Angeles–area record and musical instrument stores.

Steppenwolf sold over 25 million records worldwide, released seven gold albums and one platinum album, and had 13 Billboard Hot 100 singles, of which seven were Top 40 hits, including three top 10 successes: "Born to Be Wild", "Magic Carpet Ride", and "Rock Me". Steppenwolf enjoyed worldwide success from 1968 to 1972, but clashing personalities led to the end of the core lineup. From 1980 to 2018, John Kay was the only original member involved, having been the lead singer since 1967. The band was called John Kay & Steppenwolf from 1980 to 2018. In Canada, they had four top 10 songs, 12 top 40 and 14 in the top 100.

In 2016, the Rock and Roll Hall of Fame nominated the band for induction in 2017. Although the band fell short of enough votes to qualify for induction that year, in 2018 the Rock and Roll Hall of Fame selected one of its biggest singles—1968's "Born to Be Wild"—as an inaugural selection in its singles category.

== History ==
=== The Sparrows ===
In 1965, John Kay joined the Sparrows and was followed by Goldy McJohn. The group eventually broke up.

=== Breakthrough, success, and decline (1967–1972) ===
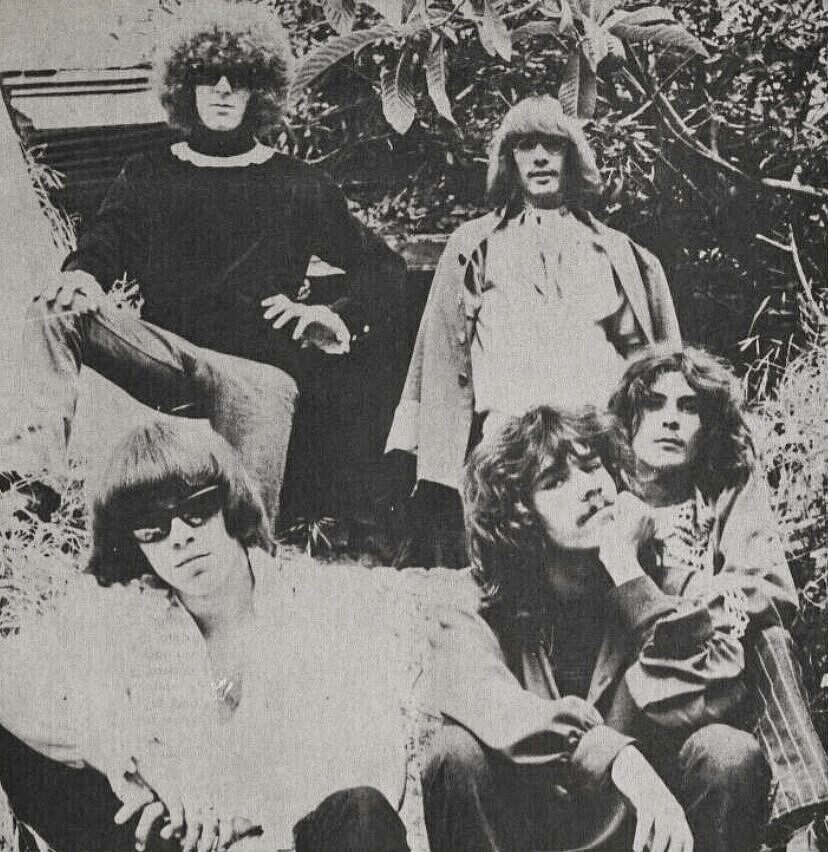
The original lineup of Steppenwolf. Clockwise from top left: McJohn, Edmonton, Moreve, Monarch, Kay

In late 1967, Gabriel Mekler urged Kay to re-form the Sparrows and suggested the name change to Steppenwolf, inspired by Hermann Hesse's 1927 novel. Steppenwolf's first two singles were "A Girl I Knew" and "Sookie Sookie". The band finally rocketed to worldwide fame after their third single, "Born to Be Wild", was released in 1968, as well as their version of Hoyt Axton's "The Pusher". Both of these tunes were used prominently in the 1969 counterculture cult film Easy Rider (both titles originally had been released on the band's debut album). In the movie Easy Rider, the song "The Pusher" accompanies a drug deal, and Peter Fonda stuffing dollar bills into his Stars and Stripes-clad fuel tank, after which "Born to Be Wild" is heard in the opening credits, with Fonda and Dennis Hopper riding their Harley choppers through the America of the late 1960s. The song, which has been closely associated with motorcycles ever since, introduced to rock lyrics the signature term "heavy metal" (though not about a kind of music, but about a motorcycle: "I like smoke and lightning, heavy metal thunder, racin' with the wind..."). Written by Sparrow guitarist Dennis Edmonton, who had begun using the pen name Mars Bonfire and inspired by a billboard roadside advertisement Bonfire liked which depicted a motorcycle tearing through the billboard artwork, the song had already reached number two on the Billboard Hot 100 in August 1968. It sold over one million copies, and was awarded a gold disc.

In 1968, Steppenwolf played one of their biggest shows up to that time at the Fillmore East to rave reviews, sharing the bill with Buddy Rich and Children of God.

The group's following albums had several more hit singles, including "Magic Carpet Ride" from The Second which reached number three and also sold over one million copies, and "Rock Me" from At Your Birthday Party which reached number 10. Monster, which questioned US Vietnam War policy, was the band's most political album. Following the Monster album from 1969, the following year, the band released Steppenwolf 7, which included the song "Snowblind Friend", another Hoyt Axton-penned song about the era and attitudes of drugs and associated problems.

Several changes in the group's personnel were made after the first few years. Bassist Rushton Moreve was fired from the group in 1968 for missing gigs after he became afraid to return to Los Angeles, convinced by his girlfriend that it was going to be leveled by an earthquake and fall into the sea. Rob Black briefly filled in for Moreve until former Sparrow bandmate Nick St. Nicholas came aboard in the latter months of 1968. Michael Monarch quit the group in August 1969 as his relationship with Kay deteriorated. Larry Byrom, who had been in TIME with Nick St. Nicholas, ably replaced Monarch on guitar. But Nick St. Nicholas was let go in mid-1970. He had supposedly appeared in nothing but rabbit ears and a jock strap at the Fillmore East in April 1970 – and his habit of wearing muumuus and kaftans on stage began to wear on Kay, whose penchant for leather vests and pants was more in line with the image he wanted for the band. George Biondo was then recruited, and the band lineup for their live performances in the middle of 1970 was John Kay, Jerry Edmonton, Goldy McJohn, Larry Byrom, and George Biondo. However this lineup was also unable to remain together, as Byrom became upset with McJohn over personal issues and quit the band in the early part of 1971. Guitarist Kent Henry then replaced Byrom.

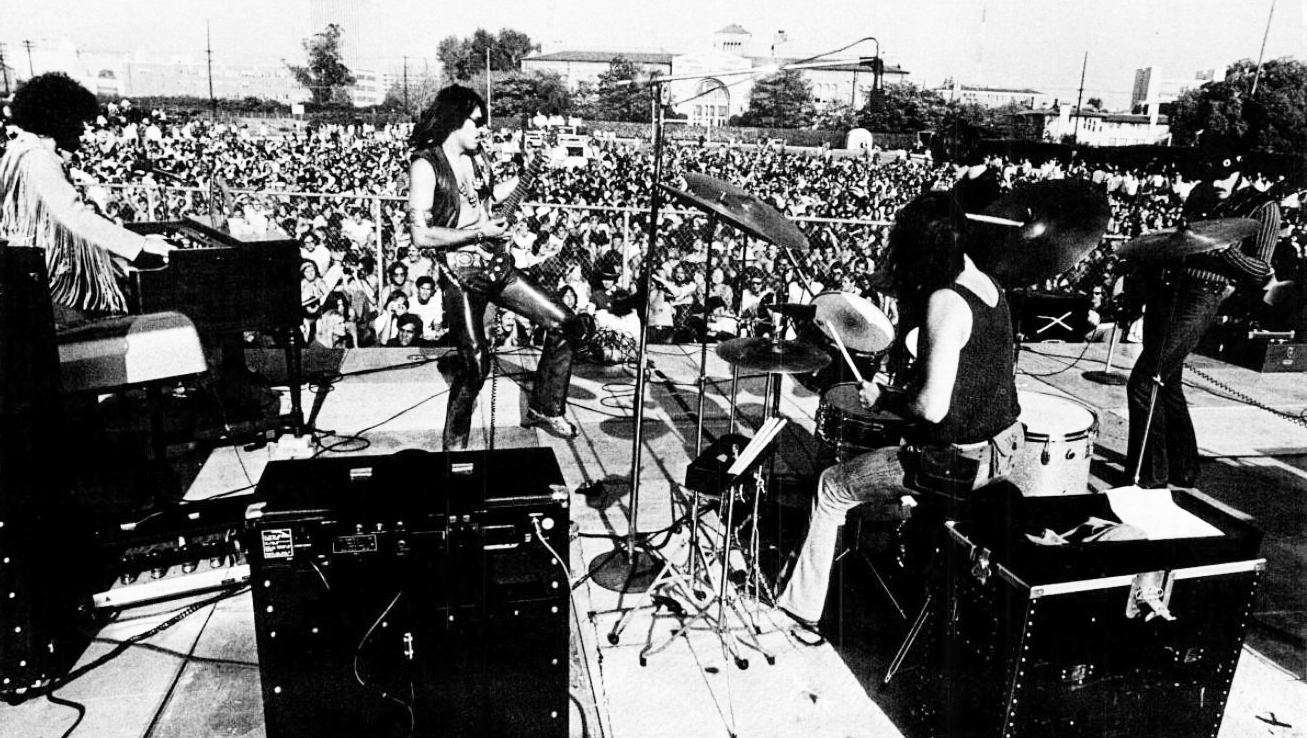
In 1970

In November 1971, the band released For Ladies Only, with the lineup consisting of Kay, Henry, Biondo, McJohn and Edmonton. The album was notable for several reasons, most notably the controversial LP inside cover art, the romantic, political, social lyrical content and the fact that it featured several of the group members on lead vocals.

=== Breakup (1972–1973) ===
The band broke up after a farewell concert in Los Angeles on Valentine's Day, 1972. Kay went on to a brief solo career, scoring a minor solo hit in 1972 with "I'm Movin' On" from his album Forgotten Songs and Unsung Heroes. Although it was generally praised by most critics, album sales were disappointing in the US. Kay released a second solo album in 1973 on the Dunhill label titled My Sportin' Life. This album sold less than his first solo album and was less gritty and more LA studio-polish in sound.

Following the first official breakup of Steppenwolf, and after the release of Kay's first solo album, a late summer and autumn 1972 tour in the US and Europe occurred, which featured Kay heading both the John Kay Band and Steppenwolf, at the top of the bill. Dunhill had released an album of a collection of Steppenwolf songs titled Rest in Peace. Thus, the tour was known as the RIP tour.

=== Reunion (1974–1976) ===
Steppenwolf reformed in 1974 with its core lineup of Kay, Edmonton and McJohn, along with longtime bassist Biondo and newcomer Bobby Cochran, Eddie Cochran's nephew, on lead guitar. The band signed with Mums Records in retaliation for what Kay perceived as a lack of support by Dunhill Records for his solo albums. Their first reunion album was Slow Flux, which included their last top 40 hit, "Straight Shootin' Woman".

In February 1975, McJohn was dismissed for what Kay described as a decline in the quality of his performances, as well as erratic behavior. McJohn was replaced by Andy Chapin on Hour of the Wolf in 1975, though McJohn appeared in artwork for the single to Caroline. After the album peaked at number 155, Kay attempted to dissolve the band again, but the label, now having been absorbed by Epic Records, insisted Steppenwolf record one more album to satisfy their contractual obligations. The ensuing album, Skullduggery (1976), featuring Wayne Cook on keyboards, was released without a tour to support it, and by the early fall of 1976, Steppenwolf disbanded a second time. Kay appeared in a segment of the popular music television show The Midnight Special to announce the end of Steppenwolf and also played a solo version of the song "Hey I'm Alright". This song appeared on Kay's third solo album All In Good Time, released on Mercury Records in 1978.

=== "New Steppenwolf" revival act (1976–1980) ===
After Kay disbanded Steppenwolf, former members Goldy McJohn and Nick St. Nicholas formed a "revival act" called "New Steppenwolf". McJohn did not last long, but St. Nicholas continued with the venture for several years. Various incarnations included, according to author Dave Thompson, a "revolving door of musicians" consisting of "jobbing players". Among those players were vocalist Tom Holland (who would go on to form the B'zz and later Holland) and drummer Steve Riley of future W.A.S.P. and L.A. Guns fame. Yet another musician involved, guitarist Glen Bui, went on to work with Goldy McJohn until he died in 2017. The Rolling Stone Encyclopedia of Rock & Roll described these bands as "unprofessional, bogus versions" of Steppenwolf. Although Kay and Edmonton had originally licensed the use of the "New Steppenwolf" name, they later sued for breach of contract. St. Nicholas agreed in 1980 to cease use of the name, but legal disputes about promotional use of the Steppenwolf name continued until 2000.

=== John Kay and Steppenwolf (1980–2018) ===
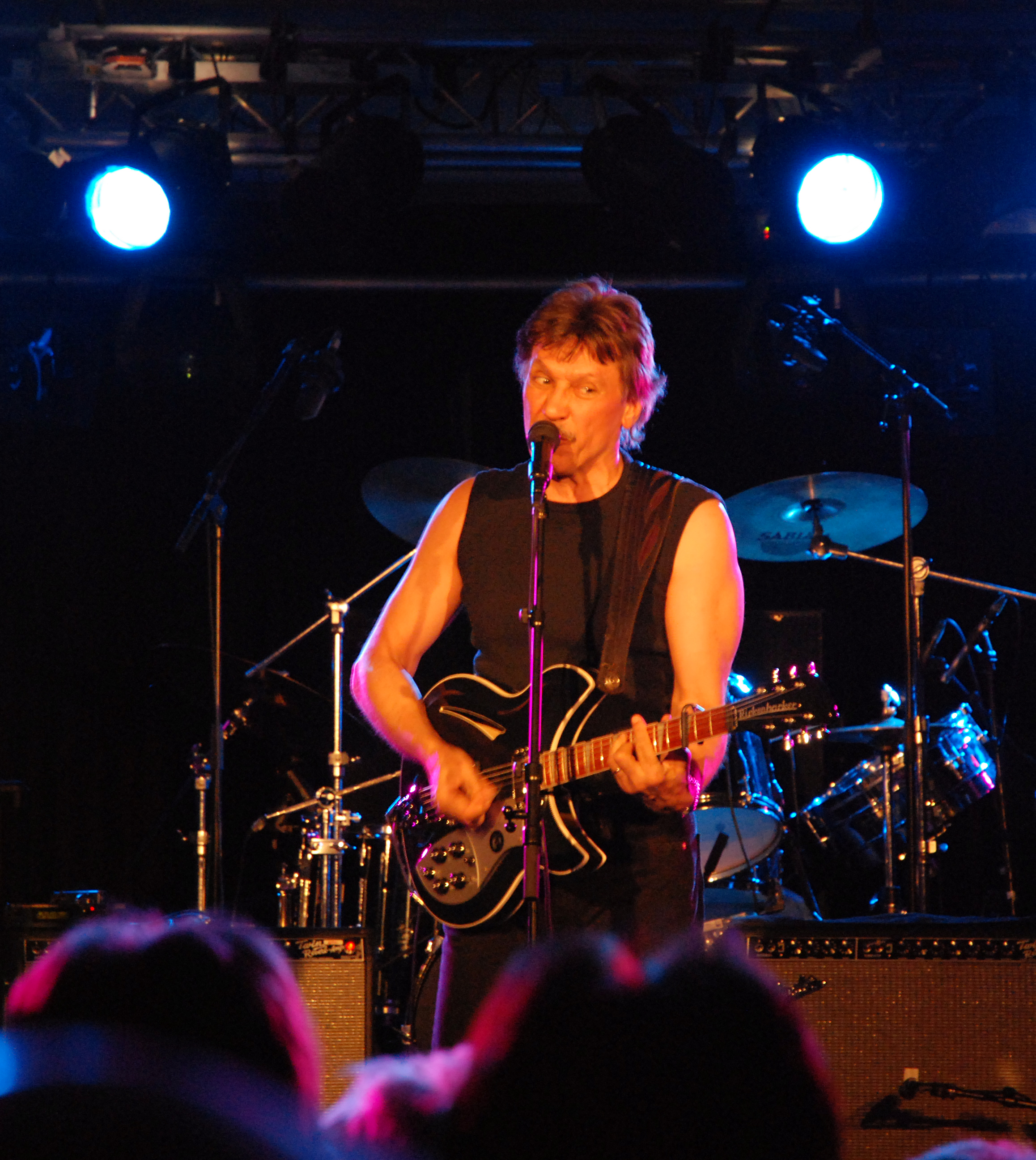
Kay and Steppenwolf performing in Lillehammer, Norway, May 2007

Kay had a few meetings with David Pesnell about management, concert promotions and producing a new album for the band. Pesnell wanted to produce an album featuring new songs on side A, by the reformed band Three Dog Night and with side B of the album featuring songs by Steppenwolf. The album's working name was "Back to Back", a play on each band having a side of the album and the fact the bands were back together again. Pesnell's concept was simple: each band should record four new songs, with a fifth song on each side featuring a medley of the band's past songs. This would give the Pesnell-produced album a double release of singles to support a concert tour featuring the two bands. Though both bands liked the concept of the album and tour, the arguments included who would be side A and side B and which of the two would headline the upcoming concert tour.

The reformed John Kay and Steppenwolf line-up featured John Kay, Michael Palmer (guitars, backing vocals), Steve Palmer (drums, backing vocals), Danny Ironstone (keyboards, backing vocals), and Kurtis Teel on bass. The Palmer brothers had played in a group called Tall Water and had also been involved with Kay in his solo career playing live gigs in the late 1970s. Teel was replaced by Chad Peery and Ironstone by Brett Tuggle by 1981, and the new grouping released Live in London overseas. Tuggle was then displaced by Michael Wilk and a new studio album, Wolftracks, was released in 1982. Wolftracks was one of the earliest digitally recorded albums in the industry. It was recorded live on a two-track Sony digital recording system. Bassist Welton Gite, who appeared on this album, left shortly after its completion and was replaced by Gary Link, formerly with Dokken. Another album, Paradox, followed in 1984.

In December 1984, the band as it was disbanded and Kay and Wilk decided to continue in early 1985 with a pared-down quartet composed of Kay, Wilk, Wilk's friend Ron Hurst (drums, backing vocals), and Rocket Ritchotte (guitars, backing vocals). Wilk also handled bass duties from his sequencing computer keyboards from then on. This line-up released Rock N' Roll Rebels (1987) and Rise & Shine (1990); these were on the Qwil and I.R.S. Records imprints, respectively. Ritchotte had departed temporarily in 1989 to be replaced by Les Dudek and then Steve Fister, but then returned in 1990 for three more years. Fister (ex–Iron Butterfly) then came back in late 1993, but turned guitar duties over to Danny Johnson (formerly of Derringer, Rod Stewart and others) in 1996.

As the band was named after the novel Der Steppenwolf by German author Hermann Hesse, who was born in the Black Forest town of Calw, the city invited them to come over and play in the International Hermann-Hesse-Festival 2002, along with other bands inspired by Hesse, such as Anyone's Daughter.

The band performed what they then labeled their "Farewell Concert" on October 6, 2007, at Ripken Stadium in Aberdeen, Maryland, featuring Kay, keyboardist and programmer Michael Wilk, drummer Ron Hurst and guitarist Danny Johnson. However, the band, rejoined by bassist Gary Link, began touring again in June 2009.

Steppenwolf was nominated for the Rock and Roll Hall of Fame in 2017, but was not inducted.

On November 22, 2019, John Kay announced that the band's show on October 14, 2018, was its last.

== Band members ==
Original lineup

- John Kay – lead vocals, rhythm guitar, harmonica (1967–1972, 1974–1976, 1980–2018)
- Michael Monarch – lead guitar, backing vocals (1967–1969)
- Rushton Moreve – bass guitar, lead & backing vocals (1968–1969; died 1981)
- Jerry Edmonton – drums, backing vocals (1967–1972, 1974–1976; died 1993)
- Goldy McJohn – keyboards, backing vocals (1967–1972, 1974; died 2017)

Final lineup

- John Kay – lead vocals, rhythm guitar, harmonica (1967–1972, 1974–1976, 1980–2018)
- Michael Wilk – keyboards, backing vocals (1982–2018), keyboard bass (1985–2009)
- Gary Link – bass, backing vocals (1982–1985, 2009–2018)
- Ron Hurst – drums, backing vocals (1984–2018)
- Danny Johnson – lead guitar, backing vocals, mandolin (1996–2018)

== Discography ==
Steppenwolf

- Steppenwolf (1968)
- The Second (1968)
- At Your Birthday Party (1969)
- Monster (1969)
- Steppenwolf Live (1970)
- Steppenwolf 7 (1970)
- For Ladies Only (1971)
- Slow Flux (1974)
- Hour of the Wolf (1975)
- Skullduggery (1976)

John Kay & Steppenwolf

- Wolftracks (1982)
- Paradox (1984)
- Rock & Roll Rebels (1987)
- Rise & Shine (1990)
