= Larry Byrom =

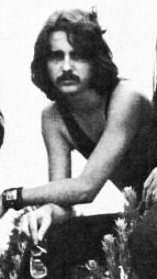
- Byrom in 1971

Background information
- Born: Lawrence Byrom; December 27, 1948 (age 77); Huntsville, Alabama, U.S.
- Genres: Blues-rock, Rock
- Occupations: Musician, Songwriter
- Instruments: Guitar; Piano; Trumpet
- Years active: 1965–present
- Formerly of: Steppenwolf

Larry Clifton Byrom (born December 27, 1948 in Huntsville, Alabama) is an American guitarist. Byrom performed in a band called the Precious Few in the 1960s, then joined T.I.M.E.; in 1969, he joined Steppenwolf. He left Steppenwolf in 1971 and formed Ratchell. Byrom began working as a session musician in 1980 after moving to Nashville, Tennessee. He played guitar for bands like Alabama.
