= Mars Bonfire =

Canadian musician

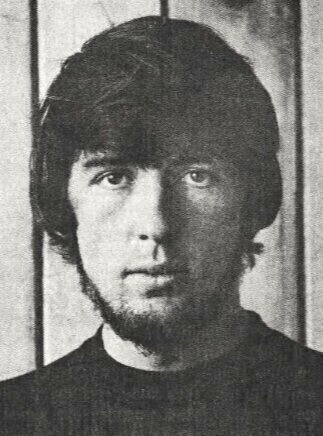
- c. early 1967

Background information
- Also known as: Dennis Edmonton
- Born: Dennis Eugene McCrohan; 21 April 1943 (age 83); Oshawa, Ontario, Canada
- Genre: Rock
- Occupations: Musician, songwriter
- Instrument: guitar

Dennis Edmonton (born Dennis Eugene McCrohan; 21 April 1943), also known by the stage name Mars Bonfire, is a Canadian rock musician and songwriter, best known for writing the hit song "Born to Be Wild" for Steppenwolf.

== Early career ==
Born Dennis Eugene McCrohan, he and his brother Jerry changed their surnames to "Edmonton" in the early 1960s. The brothers were part of the band the Sparrows, which later evolved into Steppenwolf. Another member of the Sparrows was Bruce Palmer, who later became a member of Buffalo Springfield.

== Solo career ==
Bonfire embarked on a solo career, while his brother Jerry became the drummer for Steppenwolf. After leaving the band, he often collaborated with Kim Fowley, co-writing and contributing to the recordings of Fowley and artists associated with him. On 22 June 2015, SOCAN awarded Bonfire the Cultural Impact Award at the 2015 SOCAN Awards in Toronto for his song "Born to be Wild".

== Personal life ==
Bonfire was a prolific hiker in Southern California for many years. He has completed the Hundred Peaks Section list 25 times. He was noted by the Los Angeles Times for his "affability and flexibility" as a hike leader.

== Discography ==
Songs by Mars Bonfire that were recorded by Steppenwolf include:

- "Born to Be Wild" (Steppenwolf, 1968)
- "Faster than the Speed of Life" (The Second, 1968)
- "Ride with Me" (For Ladies Only, 1971)
- "Tenderness" (For Ladies Only, 1971)
- "The Night Time's for You" (co-written with Morgan Cavett, For Ladies Only, 1971)
- "Caroline (Are You Ready for the Outlaw World)" (Hour of the Wolf, 1975)

Albums:

- Mars Bonfire (1968)
- Faster than the Speed of Life (1969)
