= Goldy McJohn =

Canadian musician (1945–2017)

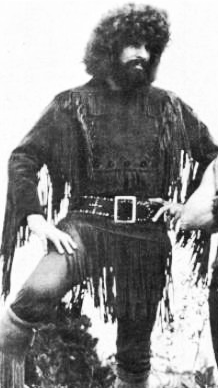
- McJohn with Steppenwolf in 1971

Background information
- Born: John Raymond Goadsby; May 2, 1945; Toronto, Ontario, Canada
- Died: August 1, 2017 (aged 72) Burien, Washington, U.S.
- Genres: Acid rock, hard rock, psychedelic rock, proto-metal
- Occupation: Musician
- Instrument: Keyboards
- Years active: 1964–2017

John Raymond Goadsby (May 2, 1945 – August 1, 2017), known as Goldy McJohn, was a Canadian keyboard player best known as the original keyboardist for rock group Steppenwolf. Originally a classically trained pianist, he was a pioneer in the early use of the electronic organ (Hammond B3) in heavy metal.

== Career ==
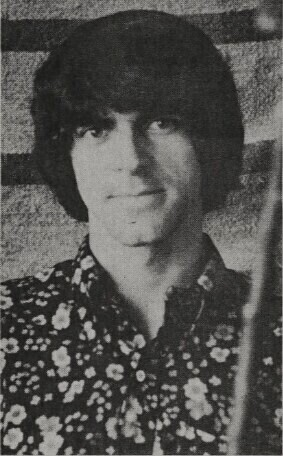
McJohn during his time in The Sparrows, early 1967

McJohn was born John Raymond Goadsby to middle class parents in Toronto, Ontario. They enrolled him in piano lessons at a young age which eventually enabled him to become a pioneer in the use of the electronic organ in rock and roll. "I was up at 4 a.m. daily to practice from the age of seven until…I got stupid. ...I was classically trained. I played on a Lowrey".

In 1964, McJohn played with local band Little John & The Friars before moving on later that year to become a member of the Mynah Birds, which also included Rick James, Bruce Palmer and (after McJohn left) Neil Young. In March 1965, he briefly joined The Diplomats before joining The Sparrows in September of that year. John Kay asked him if he could be known as "Goldy" while riding the bus to Willowdale.

Goldy felt "Goldy Goadsby" would not be right, so in honor of his mother, Dorothy (née) McIntyre, Goldy added the "Mc" to his legal first name, creating his stage name. The band (with various changes) went on to become Steppenwolf and McJohn remained with the group from 1967 to early 1975, when he was fired by Kay.

During Steppenwolf's hiatus in the early 1970s, McJohn and Steppenwolf drummer Jerry Edmonton formed Manbeast with Rod Prince and Roy Cox of Bubble Puppy, during which time the band penned at least one song that would appear on Steppenwolf's 1974 release, Slow Flux, McJohn's last with the band.

McJohn helped reform Steppenwolf in 1977 with Nick St. Nicholas and Kent Henry and played in several incarnations of the band. He also played with Steve Marriott in a reconstituted version of Humble Pie.

On April 30, 2010, for the weekend of his 65th birthday, his band 'Magic Carpet Ride' headlined the recently opened Hard Rock Cafe in Seattle including performances by Jimi Hendrix's brother Leon Hendrix, Somar featuring Steve Fossen, Roger Fisher (both Fossen and Fisher were formerly of Heart), Heartless, which is Seattle's Heart Tribute Band, Gretchen Christopher of Fleetwoods, Witchburn and "surprise celebrity guest artists."

McJohn lived in Burien, Washington, with his wife Sonja. His solo releases included New Visions, Fugue in D, Goldy McJohn & Friendz, Rat City in Blue, Set the World on Fire and Osmosis. Beginning in 2008, he performed with a national band under the name Gm and Friendz and with The Born To Be Wild Tour.

== Death ==
McJohn died of a sudden heart attack on August 1, 2017, at his home in Burien, Washington. He was 72 years old.
