= Monster (disambiguation) =

A monster is a type of fictional creature found in horror, fantasy, science fiction, folklore, mythology and religion.

Monster, The Monster or Monsters may also refer to:

== Amusement rides ==
- Monster (ride), manufactured by Eyerly Aircraft Company
- The Monster (Walygator Parc), a roller coaster in Maizières-les-Metz, Lorraine, France
- The Monster (Adventureland), a roller coaster in Altoona, Iowa, US
- Monster (Gröna Lund), a roller coaster at Gröna Lund in Stockholm, Sweden

== Brands and companies ==
- Monster Beverage, a beverage company
  - Monster Energy, an energy drink
- Monster Cable, an electronics accessories company
- Monster.com, an employment website
  - Monster Worldwide, an American provider of employment services
- Monster's, a Japanese production company for special effects (tokusatsu)

== Film and television ==
=== Film ===
- The Monster (1903 film), a French horror film
- The Monster (1925 film), an American horror film
- The Monster (1954 film), an Egyptian crime film
- The Monster (1975 film), a British horror film, also known as I Don't Want to Be Born
- Monster (1980 film), an American horror film
- The Monster (1994 film), an Italian comedy
- Monsters, Inc., a 2001 Pixar film that involves two monsters who work at a children's scream processing factory
- Monster (2003 film), an American biographical crime drama about serial killer Aileen Wuornos
- Monsters (2004 film), a short film
- Monster (2008 film), an American thriller
- Monsters (2010 film), a British sci-fi film
- Monster (2014 film), a Korean film
- Monsters (2015 film), a Chinese horror film
- The Monster (2016 film), an American horror film
- Monster (2018 film), an American drama based on the Walter Dean Myers novel
- Monster (2019 film), an Indian comedy by Nelson Venkatesan
- Monsters., a 2019 Romanian drama
- Arracht, also called Monster, 2019 Irish historical drama
- Monster (2022 film), an Indian thriller by Vysakh
- Monster (2023 Japanese film), a Japanese drama
- Monster (2023 Indonesian film), an Indonesian thriller
- Monster!, a 1999 TV film by John Lafia
- Monster, a 2005 short film by Jennifer Kent that was the precursor to The Babadook
- Monsters, a 2014 comedy video by Lee Evans

=== Television ===
==== Episodes ====
- "The Monster" (Adventure Time)
- "Monsters" (Agent Carter)
- "Monster" (Aqua Teen Hunger Force)
- "Monster" (Fear the Walking Dead)
- "Monster" (The Flash)
- "The Monster" (Highway to Heaven)
- "Monster" (Law & Order: Criminal Intent)
- "Monster" (Millennium)
- "Monsters" (Roswell)
- "Monster" (Star Wars: The Clone Wars)
- "Monster" (The Outer Limits)
- "Monsters" (The Walking Dead)

==== Series ====
- Monsters (American TV series), a 1988–1991 America horror anthology television series that aired in syndication
- Monster (anime), a 2004 Japanese anime television series based upon the manga by Naoki Urasawa
- Monsters (Japanese TV series), a 2012 Japanese television series from TBS
- Monster (South Korean TV series), a 2016 South Korean television series
- The Monster (TV series), a 2019 Iranian series by Mehran Modiri
- Beyond Evil (TV series), a 2021 South Korean drama whose original title in Korean translates to Monster
- Monster (American TV series), a Netflix crime anthology series:
  - Dahmer – Monster: The Jeffrey Dahmer Story, the first season (2022)
  - Monsters: The Lyle and Erik Menendez Story, the second season (2024)
  - Monster: The Ed Gein Story, the third season (2025)
  - Monster: The Lizzie Borden Story, the fourth season (2026)
- Haiwaan: The Monster, a 2019 Indian TV series

==== Other uses in television ====
- Monsters HD, an American channel

== Literature ==
=== Fiction ===
- The Monster (novella), 1898, by Stephen Crane
- The Monster, a 1913 novel by Edgar Saltus
- The Monster, a 1921 novel by Horace Bleackley
- Heu-Heu; or, The Monster, a 1924 novel by H. Rider Haggard
- The Monster, a 1925 novel by Eden Phillpotts
- The Monsters, a 1934 novel by Lester Dent, the 14th installment in the Doc Savage series first published in Doc Savage Magazine
- "The Monster" (short story), 1948, by A.E. Van Vogt
- The Monster, a 1949 novella by Edmond Hamilton, under the house name "S. M. Tenneshaw"
- "Monster", a 1951 short story by Joseph Samachson
- Monsters (collection), a 1965 collection of short stories by A.E. van Vogt
- The Monster (Albanian: Përbindëshi), a 1965 novel by Ismail Kadare
- The Monster, a 1968 play by Ron Milner
- Monster: A Tale of Loch Ness, a 1982 novel by Jeffrey Konvitz
- Monsters (anthology), a 1988 anthology of science fiction short stories
- Monsters, a 1989 picture book written by Russell Hoban and illustrated by Quentin Blake
- Monster, a 1992 novel by Christopher Pike
- Monster (Kellerman novel), 1999, by Jonathan Kellerman
- Monster (Myers novel), 1999, by Walter Dean Myers
- Monster (Peretti novel), 2005, by Frank Peretti
- Monster, a 2009 novel by A. Lee Martinez
- "Monster", a 2011 short story by Jeff Carlson, featured in the collection Long Eyes and Other Stories

=== Non-fiction ===
- Monster: The Autobiography of an L.A. Gang Member, a 1993 memoir by Sanyika Shakur
- Monster: Living Off the Big Screen, a 1997 book by John Gregory Dunne
- Monsters: History's Most Evil Men and Women, a 2008 history book by Simon Sebag Montefiore

=== Comics ===
- "The Monsters!", a story featured in Shock SuspenStories #1 (February-March 1952), written by Bill Gaines and Al Feldstein
- "The Monster", a story featured in House of Secrets #96 (February-March 1972), written by Jack Oleck
- "The Monster", a story featured in Forbidden Tales of Dark Mansion #10 (March-April 1973), also written by Oleck
- "The Monster!", a story featured in The Incredible Hulk #250 (August 1980), written by Bill Mantlo
- Monster (comics), a 1984–1985 British comic strip by Alan Moore, Alberto Giolitti, John Wagner and Alan Grant, and Jesus Redondo
- "Monster", a story featured in The Incredible Hulk #312 (October 1985), also written by Mantlo
- Monsters (manga), a 1994 one-shot manga by Eiichiro Oda
- Monster (manga), a 1994–2001 manga series by Naoki Urasawa
- The Monster Kid, a Japanese manga series
- Monster (DC Comics), a fictional DC Comics villain

== Games ==
- Monster (Dungeons & Dragons), a term used to refer to a variety of creatures in the game
- Monster (computer gaming), a type of non-player character
- Monsters, a clone of the arcade game Space Panic
- Monster, a character from the indie rhythm game Friday Night Funkin'
- Monster (Monster Hunter), a term used to refer to a variety of fictional creatures in the game

== Music ==
=== Musicians and bands ===
- Monster (musician)
- The Monsters, Swiss Psychobilly band led by Reverend Beat-Man

=== Albums ===
- Monster (B'z album)
- Monsters (D'espairsRay album)
- Monster (Fetchin Bones album)
- Monster (Andy Grammer album)
- Monster (Herbie Hancock album)
- Monster (Hugh Cornwell album)
- Monster (Killer Mike album)
- Monster (Kiss album)
- Monsters (Meat Puppets album)
- Monsters (The Midnight album)
- Monsters (Tom Odell album)
- Monster (Oomph! album)
- Monster (R.E.M. album)
- Monster (Steppenwolf album)
- Monster (David Thomas album)
- Monster (Usher album)
- Monster (EP), by Red Velvet – Irene & Seulgi
- Monster (mixtape), by Future
- Monster, 2013, by Noyz Narcos
- Monster, a cancelled album by P-Model

=== Songs ===
- "Monster" (Arashi song)
- "Monster" (The Automatic song)
- "Monster" (Big Bang song)
- "Monster" (Disturbed song)
- "Monster" (Disney song), from the musical adaptation of Frozen
- "Monster" (Exo song)
- "Monster" (Gabbie Hanna song)
- "Monster" (Imagine Dragons song)
- "Monster" (Kanye West song)
- "Monster" (L7 song)
- "Monster" (Lady Gaga song)
- "Monster" (Meek Mill song)
- "Monster" (Meg & Dia song)
- "Monster" (Michael Jackson song)
- "Monster" (Paramore song)
- "Monster" (Pink Lady song)
- "Monster" (Professor Green song)
- "Monster" (Red Velvet – Irene & Seulgi song)
- "Monster" (Shawn Mendes and Justin Bieber song)
- "Monster" (Skillet song)
- "Monster" (Starset song)
- "Monster" (Steppenwolf song)
- "Monster" (Yoasobi song)
- "Monster" (21 Savage song)
- "The Monster" (song), by Eminem featuring Rihanna
- "Monsters" (All Time Low song)
- "Monsters" (Eric Church song)
- "Monsters" (Funeral for a Friend song)
- "Monsters" (James Blunt song)
- "Monsters" (Saara Aalto song)
- "Monsters" (Shinedown song)
- "Monster", by Dev (singer)
- "Monster", by Dodie Clark from Human
- "Monster", by Don Diablo and Felix Jaehn, 2024
- "Monster", by Fred Schneider from Fred Schneider and the Shake Society
- "MONSTER", by KIRA ft. Megpoid (English)
- "Monster", by Kris Allen from the 2012 album Thank You Camellia
- "Monster", by LUM!X and Gabry Ponte
- "Monster", by Käptn Peng & Die Tentakel von Delphi from Expedition ins O
- "Monsters", by Blue Öyster Cult from Cultösaurus Erectus
- "Monsters", by Matchbook Romance from Voices
- "Monsters", by Something for Kate from the 2001 album Echolalia
- "Monsters", by Timeflies ft. Katie Sky

== People ==
- Rob Monster (born 1966 or 1967), American technology executive
- Dick Radatz (1937–2005), American baseball pitcher nicknamed "The Monster"
- Sanyika Shakur (1963–2021), American author and gang member with the street moniker "Monster"
- Nobuhiro Tajima (born 1950), Japanese rally driver nicknamed "Monster"
- Naoya Inoue (born 1993), Japanese two-time undisputed world boxing champion nicknamed "Kaibutsu" (the Monster)
- London Monster, Welshman Renwick Williams (or another), who stabbed many young women in late 18th century London

== Science and mathematics ==
- Monster (physics)
- Monster group, a large but finite algebraic structure in mathematical group theory
- Spiegelman Monster, an RNA chain
- Teratology studies abnormalities of physiological development in organisms

== Other uses ==
- Monster, South Holland, a town in the Netherlands
- Ducati Monster, a motorcycle
- Landkreuzer P. 1500 Monster, a self-propelled gun
- IT (XM) or Monster, a radio program
- Chinese cutter Nansha (more commonly known as Haijing 5901 or CCG-5901), Chinese Coast Guard ship nicknamed "The Monster" by Filipino media
- Monster truck, large truck with heavy duty suspension, four-wheel steering, large-displacement V8 engine, oversized tires, built for competition and entertainment
- "The Monster", a nickname for the 2011 Ringgold–Apison tornado

== See also ==
- Monster Radio (disambiguation)
- Monstrum (disambiguation)
- Moonster (disambiguation)
- Munster (disambiguation)
