= 26th KBP Golden Dove Awards =

Media awards ceremony

- Hosted by: Karylle; Robi Domingo; Weng Dela Pena

Television/radio coverage
- Network: ABS-CBN
- Produced by: Kapisanan ng mga Brodkaster ng Pilipinas

The 26th KBP Golden Dove Awards is an annual awarding ceremony in the Philippines recognizing television and radio stations from Metro Manila and the provinces, programs, personalities, public service announcements and promotional materials coming from broadcasting companies who are members of the Kapisanan ng mga Brodkaster ng Pilipinas (KBP). The awards ceremony was held at the Ceremonial Hall, Manila Marriott Hotel Grand Ball Room, Resorts World Manila, Resorts Drive, Pasay on May 29, 2018 and was aired on ABS-CBN's "Sunday's Best" on July 29, 2018.

== Winners ==
=== Stations ===
Best Television Station (Mega Manila)	Best Television Station (Provincial)
ABS-CBN Channel 2 (ABS-CBN Corporation): CNN Philippines Channel 9 (Radio Philippines Network/Nine Media Corporation); TV5 Channel 5 (TV5 Network); Net 25 Channel 25 (Eagle Broadcasting Corporation)	Not awarded
Best AM Radio Station (Mega Manila)	Best AM Radio Station (Provincial)
DZMM Radyo Patrol 630 (ABS-CBN Corporation): DZRH (Manila Broadcasting Company); DZXL 558 RMN Manila (Radio Mindanao Network); DZIQ Radyo Inquirer 990 (Trans-Radio Broadcasting Corporation); DZEC Radyo Agila 1062 (Eagle Broadcasting Corporation)	DYHB RMN Bacolod 747 (Radio Mindanao Network, Bacolod): DZGB 729 kHz "Ang Saindong Kadamay" (PBN Broadcasting Network, Legazpi); DYFM Bombo Radyo Iloilo 837 (Bombo Radyo Philippines, Iloilo City)
Best FM Radio Station (Mega Manila)	Best FM Radio Station (Provincial)
90.7 Love Radio (Manila Broadcasting Company): MOR 101.9 My Only Radio For Life! (ABS-CBN Corporation); 93.9 iFM (Radio Mindanao Network); 101.1 Yes The Best (Manila Broadcasting Company); Monster RX 93.1 (Audiovisual Communicators, Inc.)	Radyo Natin (Manila Broadcasting Company, Nationwide): 95.9 Star FM Bacolod" (Bombo Radyo Philippines, Bacolod); RW 95.1 (Radioworld Broadcasting Corporation, San Fernando, Pampanga)

=== Programs ===
Best TV Newscast (Mega Manila)	Best TV Newscast (Provincial)
Aksyon Prime (TV5 Network): New Day (CNN Philippines/Radio Philippines Network/Nine Media Corporation); Newsroom Ngayon (CNN Philippines/Radio Philippines Network/Nine Media Corporation)	TV Patrol Northern Luzon (ABS-CBN Corporation, Baguio): Metro Central Luzon Weekend Recap (CLTV 36/Radioworld Broadcasting Corporation, San Fernando, Pampanga); TV Patrol Palawan (ABS-CBN Corporation, Puerto Princesa)
Best Public Affairs Program (Mega Manila)	Best Public Affairs Program (Provincial)
The Source (CNN Philippines/Radio Philippines Network/Nine Media Corporation): Mission: Possible: "Rosas Para Kay Premrose" (ABS-CBN Corporation); Diskusyon (Net 25/Eagle Broadcasting Corporation)	So To Speak (CLTV 36/Radioworld Broadcasting Corporation, San Fernando, Pampanga): Perspektiba (CLTV 36/Radioworld Broadcasting Corporation, San Fernando, Pampanga)
Best Public Service Program	Best Variety Program
Red Alert (ABS-CBN Corporation): Salamat Dok (ABS-CBN Corporation); Lingap sa Mamamayan: Pabahay, Hanapbuhay; a Yolanda (Haiyan) 4th Anniversary Special (INCTV/Christian Era Broadcasting Service International)	It's Showtime (ABS-CBN Corporation): I Can See Your Voice (ABS-CBN Corporation); The Voice Teens (ABS-CBN Corporation)
