= Asia Pop 40 =

- Other names: AP40
- Genre: Music chart
- Running time: 2 Hours weekly (including commercials)
- Country of origin: Singapore, Taiwan
- Language(s): English; Mandarin (China only)
- Syndicates: Australia, Cambodia, China, Guam, Indonesia, New Zealand, North Mariana Islands, Philippines, Taiwan, Thailand
- Hosted by: Joey Chou (English; March 2019 - Present); Dom Lau (English; July 2013 - December 2018); Max Lim (Mandarin; June 2016 - Present)
- Created by: Rob Graham
- Written by: Rob Graham; CJ Harrison; Cameron Klepiak; Joey Chou
- Produced by: CJ Harrison (July 2013 - November 2022); Kevin Mawardi (December 2022 - March 2024); Joey Chou (April 2024 - Present)
- Executive producer(s): Rob Graham (July 2013 - March 2022); Justice Kao (March 2022 - March 2024); Joey Chou (April 2022 - Present)
- Recording studio: Kuala Lumpur, Taipei
- Original release: July 5, 2013 – present
- No. of episodes: over 600
- Website: www.asiapop40.com

Asia Pop 40 is the first regional weekly chart and countdown radio show produced in Asia and specifically for the Asian market. There is an English language version as well as a Mandarin version.

Each week Asia Pop 40 counts down the most popular songs in Asia, combining streaming numbers from Apple Music, Spotify, TikTok and YouTube across multiple markets to produce a pan-regional chart and radio programme.

Originally hosted by Dom Lau (Dominic Lau), the radio show is now presented by radio veterans Joey Chou (English) and Max Lim (Mandarin). The show plays the most popular music as well as segments including artist interviews, AP40 Hit Predictions, Buzzz Track, and Concert Track.

Asia Pop 40 is currently broadcast in over 9 countries across Asia, including in Australia and New Zealand on iHeartRadio.

Since 2024, Asia Pop 40 has expanded its operations to an all-in-one solution for Asia-focused music programming, including curated chart data, exclusive artist interviews, music distribution, and post-ready social media assets.

== Broadcasting Times ==
=== English version ===
Country (City)	Radio Station	Schedule
Australia & New Zealand	iHeartRadio (Asia Pop 40 Replay Channel)	24/7 service
Cambodia (Phnom Penh)	Radio Love FM 97.5	Saturday 9 PM–Midnight; Sunday 6–9 AM (Replay)
Guam (Hagåtña)	STAR101 (101.1 FM)	Saturday 11 AM–2 PM; Sunday 7–10 PM (Replay)
Indonesia (Jakarta, Bandung, Makassar, Medan, Semarang, Surakarta (Solo), Surabaya, Yogyakarta)	Prambors FM (102.2 Jabodetabek, 98.4 Bandung, 105.1 Makassar, 97.5 Medan, 102.0 Semarang, 99.2 Surakarta, 89.3 Surabaya, 95.8 Yogyakarta)	Saturday 6–9 AM; Sunday 5–8 PM (Replay)
Indonesia (Manado, Gorontalo)	Memora FM (Prambors network affiliate; 103.6 Manado, 89.2 Gorontalo)	Saturday 7–10 AM (Manado); Sunday 6–9 PM (Manado, Replay; Gorontalo)
Indonesia (Samarinda)	RB Radio 87.7FM	Sunday 1–4 PM; Wednesday 7–10 PM (Replay)
Indonesia (Banda Aceh)	Urban Radio Aceh (88.3 FM)	Saturday 8–11 AM; Sunday 3–6 PM (Replay)
Indonesia (Palembang)	Ninetysix Radio (Online-only)	Saturday 8–11 AM; Sunday 8–11 AM (Replay)
Indonesia (Palembang, Pekanbaru, Pangkal Pinang, Baturaja)	El John Radio (95.9 Palembang, 102.6 Pekanbaru, 88.5 Pangkal Pinang, 89.7 Baturaja)	Saturday 7–10 PM; Sunday 1–4 PM (Replay)
Tokyo Metropolitan Area (Japan)	InterFM897	Saturday Noon–2 PM; Friday 7–8:50 AM (Replay)
Northern Mariana Islands (Saipan)	KZMI 103.9FM	Saturday 11 AM–2 PM
Philippines (Davao City, Cebu City, General Santos City)	Monster Radio (Monster BT 99.5 Davao, Monster BT 105.9 Cebu, Monster General Santos)	Sunday 6–8 AM
Philippines (Dumaguete)	AllHitz24 (Online-only)	Saturday 3–5 PM; Sunday 7–9 PM (Replay)
Taiwan (Taipei, Chiayi, Kaohsiung, Taichung)	ICRT FM100 (100.7 Taipei & Kaohsiung, 100.8 Chiayi, 100.1 Taichung)	Saturday 5–8 PM
Thailand (Phuket)	Live 89.5 Radio	Friday 9 PM–Midnight; Sunday 1–4 PM (Replay)
Thailand (Hua Hin)	Surf 102.5 FM	Saturday 9 AM–Noon; Sunday 6–9 PM (Replay)
Thailand (Pattaya)	the SPOT (91.75 FM)	Friday 6–9 PM; Saturday 11 AM–2 PM (Replay)
Thailand (Chiang Mai)	Chili Radio (Chili Pop; Online-only)	Saturday 9 AM–Noon; Sunday 3–6 PM (Replay)
United Arab Emirates	LUV 107.1	Saturday 4–7 PM; Sunday 10 AM–1 PM (Replay)
United States of America (Dallas–Fort Worth)	LUV Dallas 104.9–HD4	Saturday 5–8 PM; Sunday 5–8 PM (Replay)

=== Mandarin version (China only) ===
The schedule was currently unknown due to content restrictions.
