= 20th Century Masters – The Millennium Collection: The Best of Steppenwolf =

Greatest hits album by Steppenwolf
- Released: April 20, 1999
- Genre: Hard rock
- Length: 37:40
- Label: Universal

Steppenwolf chronology
Summerdaze (1997)	20th Century Masters – The Millennium Collection: The Best of Steppenwolf (1999)	All Time Greatest Hits (1999)

Singles from 20th Century Masters – The Millennium Collection: The Best of Steppenwolf
- 1. "Born to be Wild" (re-release)" Released: 1999

20th Century Masters – The Millennium Collection: The Best of Steppenwolf, released by Universal Music as part of their 20th Century Masters – The Millennium Collection series, is a CD that collects material by Steppenwolf from 1968 to 1971. The compilation focuses on Steppenwolf’s Dunhill recordings, with the bulk of material coming from their Steppenwolf through At Your Birthday Party albums. While generally regarded as a solid representation of Steppenwolf’s early-period proto-metal work from the 1960s, there were no new tracks or previously unreleased songs included. It includes liner notes by Joseph Laredo and was digitally remastered by Erick Labson (MCA Music Media Studios, North Hollywood, California). It was certified Gold by the Recording Industry Association of America on October 29, 2004, the first output by Steppenwolf to earn such a designation since 16 Greatest Hits went gold on April 12, 1971.

== Track listing ==
No.	Title	Writer(s)	Length
1.	"Born to Be Wild"	Mars Bonfire	3:28
2.	"Magic Carpet Ride"	John Kay, Rushton Moreve	4:27
3.	"It's Never Too Late"	Kay, Nick St. Nicholas	3:00
4.	"Rock Me"	Kay	3:39
5.	"Snowblind Friend"	Hoyt Axton	3:52
6.	"Hey Lawdy Mama"	Larry Byrom, Jerry Edmonton, Kay	2:54
7.	"Ride With Me"	Bonfire	3:21
8.	"Move Over"	Kay, Gabriel Mekler	3:52
9.	"Who Needs Ya?"	Byrom, Kay	2:55
10.	"The Pusher"	Axton	5:48

== Personnel ==
- John Kay – lead vocals, guitar
- Jerry Edmonton – drums, vocals
- Goldy McJohn – organ, vocals
- Michael Monarch – guitar, vocals
- Rushton Moreve – bass, vocals
- Nick St. Nicholas – bass, vocals
- Larry Byrom – guitar, vocals
- George Biondo – bass, vocals
- Kent Henry – guitar, vocals
