= Rusher =

Rusher may refer to:

== Sports ==
- any football player who rushes
  - List of NFL rushing yards leaders
  - List of NFL rushing champions
  - List of NFL teams with multiple 1000 yard rushers

== People ==
- Brandy Rusher, model and contestant on America's Next Top Model
- Daniel Ruczko, a.k.a. Rusher, German film director and music producer
- Jack Rusher, American Olympic rower
- Masao Kimura, a.k.a. Rusher Kimura, Japanese professional wrestler
- Matt Bloom, a.k.a. Rusher Road, American professional wrestler
- Nicholas Rusher, American rower
- Rusher Itamae, Japanese comedian
- William A. Rusher, political columnist and one of the founders of the American conservative movement

== Other ==
- Rusher Hotel, a.k.a. the Great Southern Hotel, a historic hotel in Brinkley, Arkansas
- A loyal fan of The Morning Rush, a Philippine weekday morning radio show
