= Early Steppenwolf =

Live album by Steppenwolf
- Released: July 1969
- Recorded: May 14, 1967
- Venue: The Matrix, San Francisco, California
- Genre: Blues rock; psychedelic rock
- Length: 43:37
- Label: ABC Dunhill Records
- Producer: Peter Abram

Steppenwolf chronology
At Your Birthday Party (1969)	Early Steppenwolf (1969)	Monster (1969)

Early Steppenwolf is a collection of live recordings by Steppenwolf when they were still known as "The Sparrow" (see: The Sparrows). It was released in July 1969 on the ABC Dunhill Records label.

Prior to the formation of the Steppenwolf partnership in 1968, music producer arranger, Gabriel Mekler changed the name of the band based on a book he was reading at the time by Hermann Hesse. Nick St. Nicholas was one of the driving forces in music of the hippie counterculture movement, the Summer of Love, having booked the band at the Matrix club in the San Francisco Bay Area. On May 14, 1967, the manager of the Matrix club recorded two shows, including a 20-minute version of The Pusher. These are the live recordings released by ABC Dunhill Records as Early Steppenwolf .

Professional ratings
Review scores
Source	Rating
AllMusic	3/5 stars
The Village Voice	C

== Track listing ==
Side one

1. "Power Play" (John Kay) – 2:55
2. "Howlin' for My Darlin'" (Dixon, Howlin' Wolf) – 4:53
3. "I'm Going Upstairs" (Hooker) – 7:14
4. "Corina, Corina" (Arranged and adapted by Kay) – 3:54
5. "Tighten up Your Wig" (Kay) – 3:14

Side two

1. "The Pusher" (Hoyt Axton) – 21:27

== Personnel ==
=== Musicians ===
- John Kay – guitar, vocals, liner notes
- Mars Bonfire – guitar
- Goldy McJohn – piano, organ
- Nick St. Nicholas –bass, backing vocals
- Jerry Edmonton – drums

=== Technical ===
- Peter Abram – producer
- David Travis – engineer
- Gary Burden – art direction, design
