= Monster Radio =

Monster Radio may refer to:

- DWRX, a radio station (93.1 FM) licensed to Pasig City, Philippines
- DXBT, a radio station (99.5 FM) licensed to Davao City, Philippines
- DYBT, a radio station (105.9 FM) licensed to Cebu City, Philippines
- WGGH, a radio station (1150 AM) licensed to Marion, Illinois, United States
