= DWKC =

DWKC may refer to both stations in Metro Manila:

- DWKC-FM, an FM radio station branded as iFM
- DWKC-DTV, a digital television station
