= Gaisano Mall of Davao =

- Mall facade
- Location: Davao City, Philippines
- Coordinates: 7°04′40″N 125°36′51″E
- Address: J.P. Laurel Ave., Bajada, Davao City
- Opened: April 20, 1997; 29 years ago
- Owner: DSG Sons Group, Inc.
- Num. of stores: 700
- Floor area: 240,605 m^{2} (2,589,850 sq ft)
- Floors: 8
- Public transit: Buhangin via JP Laurel Catitipan via JP Laurel Landmark 3 Cabantian Country Homes Emily Homes Juliville Tigatto Communal Mandug; Sasa via JP Laurel Doña Pilar-Roxas Ave.; Obrero; Panacan via JP Laurel Panacan-SM City Panacan-Ilustre; Tibungco-Roxas Ave. Bunawan-Roxas Ave. Lasang-Roxas Ave.; Ulas-Magsaysay Ave. Matina Pangi-Magsaysay Ave.; Route 4 Route 10; R603 Buhangin; R763 Panacan (via Buhangin) Future: M3 GMall of Davao
- Website: gaisanomalls.com

Gaisano Mall of Davao (branded as GMall of Davao), is a major shopping mall located along J.P. Laurel Avenue, Bajada, Davao City, Philippines, part of the Gaisano Malls operated by DSG Sons Group, Inc. with a total floor area of 240,605 m^{2} (2,589,850 sq ft). It was formerly the largest shopping mall in Davao City and in Mindanao until SM City Davao surpassed it as the largest since 2025 due to its 2023 expansion building.

== Establishment ==
The mall opened on April 20, 1997, with only 4 floors.

== Features ==
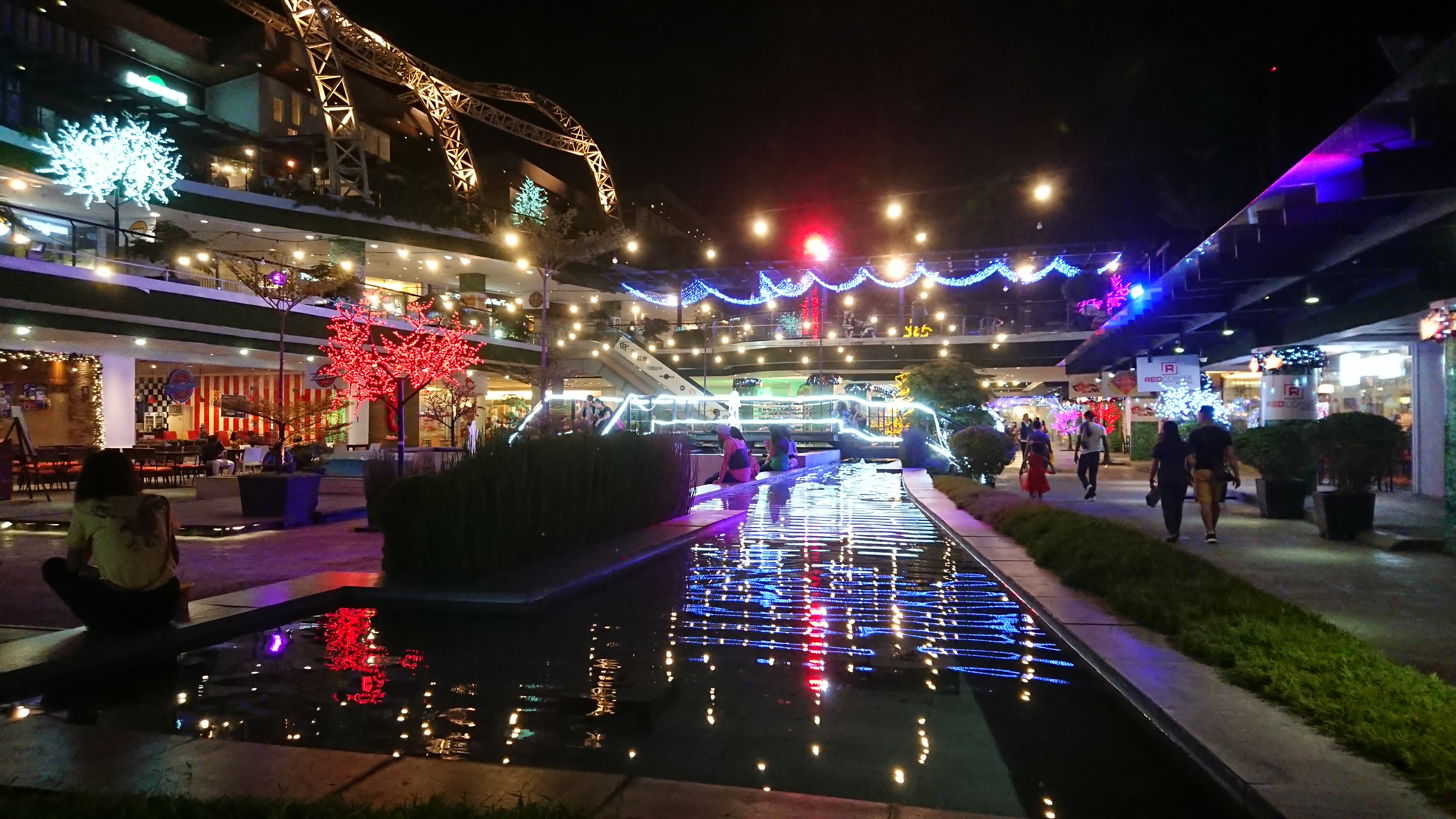
Viewing platform of GMall of Davao at night

It is the largest of more than 40 Gaisano malls in the Philippines and the 2nd largest mall in Davao City and in Mindanao.

The 6-story mall houses about 620 to 700 retail stores and shops. It consists stores and restaurants, a department store, a supermarket on the ground floor, and a cinema on the top floor. It also has an arcade. It is the only mall in Davao City that has a Red Carpet Theater - a luxury movie theater with leather couches.

=== The Peak ===
At the topmost part of the mall is "The Peak" which is located at 6th level, a new attraction for shoppers, which was intentionally built to compete with SM City Davao's The Annex, SM Lanang's Fountain Court and Abreeza's high-end restaurants. This also houses Monster BT 99.5, an FM radio station owned by Audiovisual Communicators, where its studio and transmitter are located.

== Incidents ==
- 5 people have died by suicide inside the mall since 2014. the first suicide incident was recorded on August 20, 2013, the second on March 17, 2014; the third was on November 6, 2015; the fourth on February 11, 2017; and the latest was on January 6, 2019. After series of suicide incidents inside Gaisano Mall, the management has put barriers on the fifth floor of the mall to further avoid fatal incident in the future.
- On February 17, 2025, a 40-year-old businessman identified as "Dan" reportedly died by suicide after jumping from the fifth floor of Gaisano Mall of Davao.
- Another case of suicide happened during September 13, 2022, wherein a 22 year old man from Kidapawan City was found dead from falling down Gaisano Mall of Davao's multi-story parking building.
- The mall was subjected to one of the two terrorist bombings that occurred on September 17, 2013, the other one being at SM City Davao. It happened during the time of armed crisis in Zamboanga City, which involved elements of the Moro National Liberation Front (MNLF); however, the MNLF Davao Regional Command denied that they were behind the bombings.
- A small fire occurred on April 10, 2019, at a pizza parlor of Shakeys branch, located at the upper ground floor of the mall.
