= The Morning Rush =

Weekday radio show in the Philippines

- Genre: Comedy, talk
- Running time: 240 minutes (6:00 to 10:00 am); 120 minutes (Mon–Thu 10:00 am to 12:00 nn; edited version for Cebu and Davao)
- Country of origin: Philippines
- Languages: English, Tagalog
- Home station: Monster RX 93.1 (1996–1999, 2002–present); 93.9 KCFM (1999–2002)
- Syndicates: Monster BT 105.9 (Cebu) (2018–present); Monster BT 99.5 (Davao) (2020–present)
- Starring: Chico Garcia; Hazel Aguilon; Markki Stroem
- Created by: Monster RX 93.1 (1996–1999, 2002–present); 93.9 KCFM (1999–2002)
- Original release: July 8, 1996 – present
- Website: www.rx931.com

The Morning Rush is a flagship weekday radio show hosted by Chico Garcia, Hazel Aguilon, and Markki Stroem. It airs every Monday to Friday from 6 to 10 am on Monster RX 93.1, with an edited version of the show airing every Monday to Thursday from 10 am to 12 pm (two hours) on Monster BT 105.9 in Cebu and Monster BT 99.5 in Davao. It is also broadcast every last Saturday of the month from 6 am to 9 am as a special program.

The show first aired on Monster Radio on July 8, 1996 with Chico and Delamar, and moved to 93.9 KCFM (now iFM) in 1999 before returning to Monster Radio in 2002. The show is known for having a following of loyal listeners who call themselves "Rushers".

== Background ==
Its main feature is the Top Ten (formerly Hot Ten). The DJs pick a topic for the day and announce it at the start of the show. During the four-hour stretch, listeners submit their entries for the top ten via SMS or through their Twitter account. The DJs then pick the best entries and announce it every half-hour, alternating for the bottom half and the top half of the list. Previously, the show had strictly followed the rule that only the top ten entries were picked (five entries for the bottom half, and five entries for the top half). Recently however, to accommodate the sheer amount of entries coming in, they have relaxed the rules around the number of entries picked, and usually exceed the usual ten entries. The whole show, in total, ends up with four lists. On every last Saturday of the month, The Morning Rush airs as a special show that aims to be the general meet-up of all the loyal Rushers and the DJs. On their 15th-year anniversary (last July 9, 2011, the second Saturday of the month), they broadcast their show from the Ortigas Park branch of Coffee Bean and Tea Leaf.

Recently, with the addition of Gino Quillamor, three new portions have temporarily made it to the show. The "Epic Pic" features various photos of the DJs in hilarious poses. These photos are posted weekly on their Facebook fan page. "Epic Pics" are now infrequently shown, usually only when a significant event happens, or a significant guest joins the show. The "Epic Rap-Off" aims to feature the rapping skills of the DJs in a rap-off, usually revolving around a specific theme. "Epic Rap-Offs" are now less frequent, only being done when guests are present during the show. More recent are "Scandals": infrequent random video clips of the three DJs in hilarious or suggestive scenarios.

== Milestones ==
In 1999, while Chico and Delamar moved to 93.9 KCFM until 2002, Boom Gonzalez, Trish and Fran are temporary hosts of the show.

In 2005, the show had two new members: Brad Turvey and Sarah. Brad Turvey joins every Mondays and Wednesdays while Sarah joins in between those days.

In 2007, they were joined by Karen.

On March 11, 2011, the big reveal was announced—Delamar is pregnant and is due in October.

On July 11, 2011, Gino substituted for Delamar for the first time, creating the tandem "Chi-Chi and GiGi" which lasted until December 16, 2011. On that last day of Gino's substitution, they had a Top Ten topic entitled "Most Dramatic Goodbyes" thinking it was the last time they would be on air together.

On October 11, 2011, Delamar gave birth to a healthy baby boy. From then, she was on maternity leave. Gino subbed for her until she can fully recover, creating the "Chichi and Gigi" tandem. This tandem pushed the radio show in another direction. Many were surprised by the excellent tandem of the two and immediately became an instant hit with listeners, new and old. Aside from the top ten, Chico and Gino added the "Epic Picture" and "Epic Rap Off".

As of December 19, 2011, Delamar had returned on the radio. Surprisingly, The Morning Rush announced that Gino would now be a mainstay in the show, forming the "Kikay Barkada".

As of late 2011, Chico and Delamar released their book entitled "The Best Of Chico And Delamar's The Morning Rush Top 10." The book was officially launched on 28 January 2012 in the activity center in Robinsons Galleria. It has ranked number 1 bestseller among local books sold in National Bookstore, as of April, 2012. The book is a compilation of the best Top 10 entries sent in by listeners during the Top 10 segment of the show.

On February 3, 2013, Chico, Delamar, and Gino, released the book "The Best of Chico, Delamar, and Gino's The Morning Rush Top 10: Book 2" in Robinson's Galleria.

As of the last quarter of 2015, the gang has released their 3rd installment of "The Best of Chico, Delamar, and Gino's The Morning Rush Top 10". Also, during this period, they were joined by Bea Fabregas every Tuesdays and Thursdays. As of November 2015, Bea became a daily regular as Delamar's substitute.

On July 22, 2016, Delamar announced her departure from the show, after 20 years, with her last show on July 29, 2016. Bea also announced that she will no longer be part of the show.

On April 5, 2017, it was announced that Rica Garcia will be joining Chico and Gino.

On June 21, 2018, Chico officially announced the departure of Gino Quillamor.

On June 25, 2018, Chico and Rica were officially joined by Hazel Aguilon. The trio is unofficially called the "Boobellas".

As of September 18, 2018, Rica Garcia is transferred to Wild and Wicked, leaving Chico and Hazel as the hosts of the radio show.

In 2018, Markki Stroem joined the show and alternates with Rica Garcia. In 2019, all four hosts are in the show every Friday.

Also in 2018, the show has been expanded to nationwide airing with an edited version of the show made its debut on Monster Radio BT 105.9, RX 93.1's sister station in Cebu City.

In 2020, amid the COVID-19 pandemic, the show made its airing on Monster Radio BT 99.5 in Davao.

== Segments and format ==
Popular segments of The Morning Rush include:

- Top 10: Listeners submit entries based on a daily topic, which the hosts read and discuss.
- Dear TMR: Hosts read and provide advice on listener-submitted letters.
- TMR Celebrities: Interviews with various local and international celebrities.
- TMR Public Service: Announcements and updates for the community.

The show blends talk and comedy, and suits listeners looking for such a listening experience.

== Notable episodes ==
On the evening of March 31, 2022, the show pulled an April Fools' Day publicity stunt on its social media channels, under the premise that the radio program would end after 25 years on the air. The stunt was later revealed the following day, April 1, on the radio show itself, but it generated online comments and replies from Rushers mostly sharing memorable moments from the show and its hosts.

== Achievements ==
- 17th KBP Golden Dove Awards – Best FM Radio Games/Variety Program Host to Chico Garcia
- 17th KBP Golden Dove Awards – Best FM Radio Music Radio Jock to Delamar Arias
- 19th KBP Golden Dove Awards – Best FM Radio Comedy Program
- 20th KBP Golden Dove Awards – Best FM Radio Comedy Program
- Yahoo! OMG Awards 2012 – OMG Best Radio Show of the Year
- 2012 Tatt Awards #TrendingRadio Award
- 22nd KBP Golden Dove Awards – Best FM Radio Comedy Program
- 2014 COMGUILD Awards Best FM Radio Program
- 2014 COMGUILD Awards Best FM Radio DJ to Delamar Arias
- 2014 Tatt Awards – Best Podcast
- 2015 Nuffnang's Blogopolis – Powerhouse Podcast Award
- 24th KBP Golden Dove Awards – Best FM Radio Comedy Program
- 24th KBP Golden Dove Awards – Best FM Radio Music Radio Jock to Chico Garcia
