= Moonster =

Moonster may refer to:

- Peugeot Moonster, a 2001 French concept car
- "Moonster", a song on Dance Dance Revolution SuperNova

== See also ==
- Monster (disambiguation)
- Moonstar (disambiguation)
- Munster (disambiguation)
