= Man on a Mission =

Man on a Mission may refer to:

- "Man on a Mission", a song by Gamma Ray on the 1995 album Land of the Free
- "Man on a Mission", a song by Hall & Oates on the 2003 album Do It for Love
- "Man on a Mission", a song by Hemingway Corner
- "Man on a Mission", a song by John Kay and Steppenwolf on the 1987 album Rock & Roll Rebels
- "Man on a Mission", a song by Richard Ashcroft on the 2002 album Human Conditions
- "Man on a Mission", a song by Van Halen on the 1991 album For Unlawful Carnal Knowledge
- "man on a mission", a song by DDG, featuring Kyle Richh and NLE Choppa
- "Man on a Mission", a song by the Black Keys on their 2025 album No Rain, No Flowers
- Men on a Mission, a professional wrestling tag team
