= Paradox (John Kay and Steppenwolf album) =

Studio album by Steppenwolf
- Released: 1984
- Studios: American Recording Co., Studio City, California
- Genre: Rock
- Length: 38:09
- Labels: Black Leather Music, Inc.
- Producer: Richard Podolor

Steppenwolf chronology
Wolftracks (1982)	Paradox (1984)	Rock & Roll Rebels (1987)

Professional ratings
Review scores
Source	Rating
AllMusic	2.5/5 stars

Paradox is the eleventh studio album by the band Steppenwolf now known as John Kay and Steppenwolf. It was released in 1984 (see 1984 in music) on the Black Leather Music label. It was originally released only in Canada and Australia. Bassist Gary Link replaced Welton Gite on this album. It also marked a return to recording at American Recording Studios, last used to record For Ladies Only in 1971.

== Track listing ==
Side one

1. "Watch Your Innocence" (Jackie DeShannon, Duane Hitchings) – 3:15
2. "Nothin' Is Forever" (John Kay, Steven Palmer, Michael Wilk) – 3:37
3. "You're the Only One" (Kay) – 5:11
4. "The Fixer" (Kay, Palmer) – 2:53
5. "Give Me News I Can Use" (Kay) – 3:46

Side two

1. "Only the Strong Survive" (Jerry Lynn Williams) – 3:36
2. "Ain't Nothin' Like It Used to Be" (Kay) – 3:52
3. "Slender Thread of Hope" (Kay) – 4:47
4. "Tell Me It's All Right" (Kay, Palmer) – 3:43
5. "Circles of Confusion" (Kay, Palmer) – 3:26

== Personnel ==
=== John Kay and Steppenwolf ===
- John Kay – vocals, guitar
- Michael Palmer – lead guitar, backing vocals
- Gary Link – bass, backing vocals
- Steven Palmer – drums, percussion, vocals
- Michael Wilk – keyboards, programming

=== Additional musicians ===
- Jackie DeShannon – backing vocals
- Phil Seymour – backing vocals
- Brett Tuggle – backing vocals
- Duane Hitchings – instrumental contributions

=== Technical ===
- Richard Podolor – producer
- Bill Cooper – engineer
