= DXEZ =

Radio station in General Santos, Philippines

- General Santos; Philippines
- Broadcast area: South Cotabato, Sarangani and surrounding areas
- Frequency: 92.5 MHz
- Branding: Radyo Sincero

Programming
- Languages: Cebuano, Filipino
- Format: News and music

Ownership
- Owner: Audiovisual Communicators, Inc.

History
- First air date: 1996
- Former names: City of Dreams (1996–2009); Monster Radio (2017–2018; 2022-2023); Monster Radio Davao relay (2018–2023)
- Former frequencies: 88.7 MHz (1996–2026)

Technical information
- Licensing authority: NTC

DXEZ (92.5 FM) is a radio station owned by Audiovisual Communicators.

== History ==
It first went on air in 1996 as City of Dreams EZ 88.7 with a Smooth Jazz format. It went off the air in 2009. In June 2017, the station went back on air, this time as Monster Radio EZ 88.7. It aired a mix of Top 40 and Smooth Jazz. In the beginning of 2018, it became a relay station of BT 99.5 in Davao. In 2022, it brought back its originating programming, but retained its Davao simulcast at certain times.

In 2023, ABJ Broadcasting Services took over the station's operations and relaunched it as Radyo Sincero with a news and music format. On September 24, 2026, Radyo Sincero transferred its operations to 92.5 FM, leaving the frequency off the air.
