= DZXL =

Radio station in Metro Manila, Philippines

DZXL News (DZXL)
- San Juan; Philippines
- Broadcast area: Mega Manila and surrounding areas
- Frequency: 558 kHz
- Branding: DZXL News 558

Programming
- Language: Filipino
- Format: News, Public Affairs, Talk
- Network: Radyo Mo Nationwide

Ownership
- Owner: Radio Mindanao Network
- Sister stations: 93.9 iFM

History
- First air date: October 19, 1963
- Former call signs: DZHP (1963–1975); DWXL (1975–1987)
- Former names: Radyo Primero; Ang Radyo Natin; Radyo Agong; RMN News Manila; RMN Manila; Radyo Trabaho
- Former frequencies: 1130 kHz (1963–1978)
- Call sign meaning: Extra Large (former branding)

Technical information
- Licensing authority: NTC
- Class: A (clear frequency)
- Power: 40,000 watts

Links
- Webcast: Listen Live via eRadioPortal; Watch Live
- Website: RMN Manila

DZXL News (558 AM) is a radio station owned and operated by the Radio Mindanao Network. The station's studio is located at the RMN Broadcast Center, Unit 809, 8th Floor, Atlanta Centre, #31 Annapolis Street, Greenhills, San Juan, Metro Manila, while its transmitter is located at Bagumbayan Street, Barangay Taliptip, Bulakan, Bulacan.

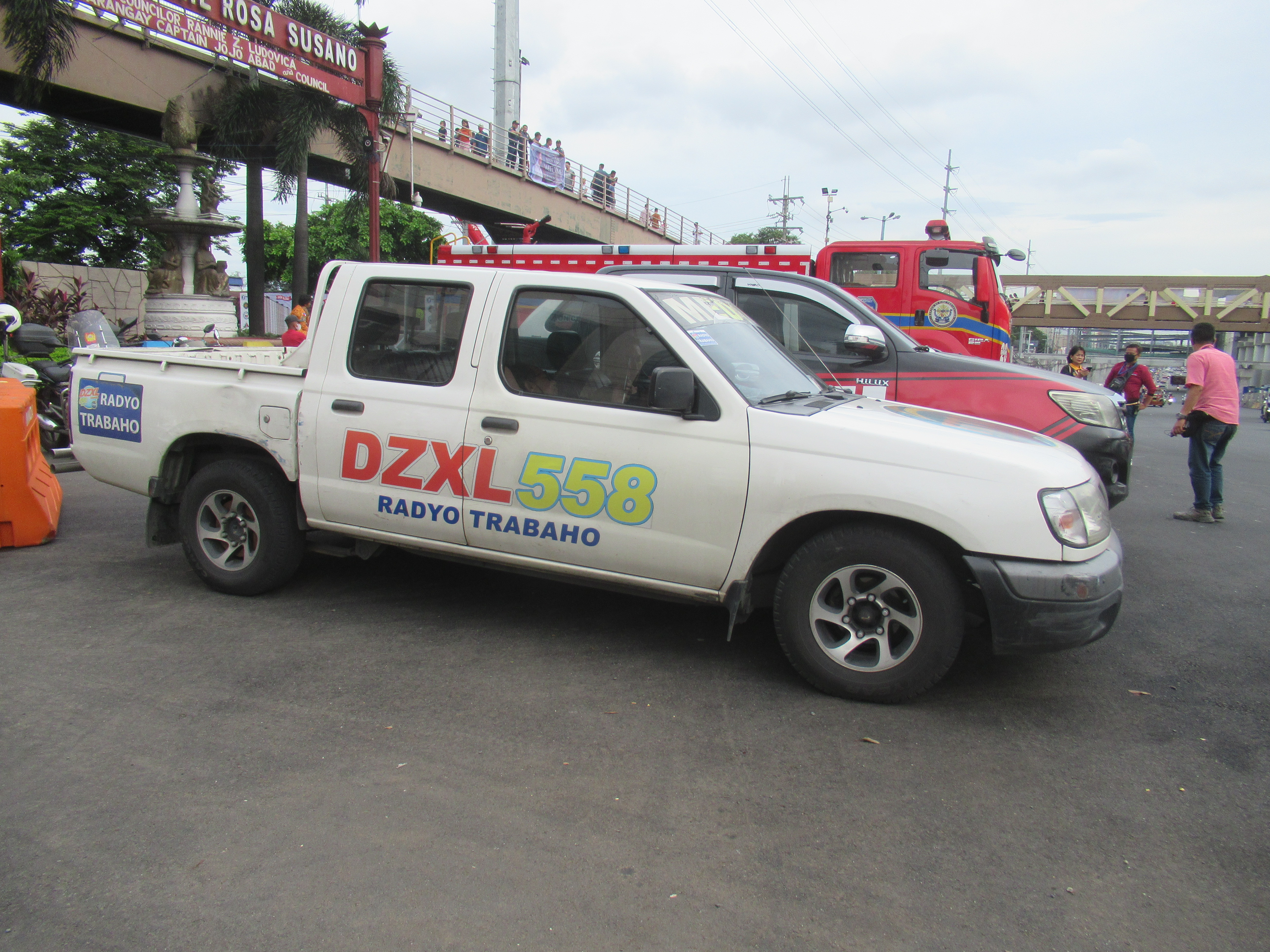
Vehicle at Batasan Hills, Quezon City

As of Q4 2022, DZXL is the 4th most-listened to AM radio station in Mega Manila, based on a survey commissioned by Kantar Media Philippines and Kapisanan ng mga Brodkaster ng Pilipinas.

== History ==
The current iteration of DZXL can be traced back to 1963 when DZHP was launched by the RMN-IBC-Philippines Herald tri-media organization when the Canoys made its first station to be launched outside of Mindanao. With the help of Andrés Soriano Jr., DZHP began its broadcast at 11:30am on October 19, 1963 at 1130 kilocycles with then-President Diosdado Macapagal welcoming listeners. Dubbed as "The Sound of the City", DZHP was the home to prominent radio personalities including Jose Mari Velez and Harry Gasser.

In 1975, DZHP changed its call sign to DWXL. In 1978, the station moved to its present frequency at 558 KHz due to the switch of the Philippine AM bandplans from the NARBA-mandated 10 kHz spacing to the 9 kHz rule implemented by the Geneva Frequency Plan of 1975. A year after EDSA People Power Revolution, the station changed again its call sign to DZXL.

From 1994 to 2010, the station became the staple of broadcaster Raffy Tulfo's public service program Wanted sa Radyo.

== Controversies ==
DZXL's coverage of the 2010 Manila hostage crisis was criticized for breaching media ethical standards. An interview conducted with the hostage-taker, Rolando Mendoza, was cited in the Incident Investigation and Review Committee report as having "blocked the negotiators' efforts to stop the hostage-taker from shooting his hostages." DZXL's legal counsel, former senator Nene Pimentel, defended the actions of the media, asserting that they were simply "doing their job". He took exception to the perceived lack of response from the authorities regarding the hostage-taker, noting that the radio station only intervened nine hours after the crisis began.

== Notable anchors ==
=== Current ===
- Carl Balita
- Barry Gutierrez

=== Former ===
- Aljo Bendijo
- Mike Enriquez
- Erwin Tulfo
- Leni Robredo
