= Steppenwolf Live =

Live album by Steppenwolf
- Released: April 1970
- Recorded: January 22, 1970
- Venue: Santa Monica Civic Auditorium, Santa Monica, California
- Genre: Psychedelic rock; blues rock; hard rock
- Length: 67:37
- Label: ABC Dunhill; MCA
- Producer: Gabriel Mekler

Steppenwolf chronology
Monster (1969)	Steppenwolf Live (1970)	Steppenwolf 7 (1970)

Singles from Steppenwolf Live
- 1. "Hey Lawdy Mama" Released: April 1970

Professional ratings
Review scores
Source	Rating
AllMusic	2/5 stars
AllMusic	3/5 stars

Steppenwolf Live is primarily a collection of recordings from a single concert early in 1970 at the Santa Monica Civic Auditorium by Steppenwolf staged in support of their 1969 album Monster. Released in April 1970 by Dunhill Records, it contains Steppenwolf's well-known hits: "Born to Be Wild", "Magic Carpet Ride" and "The Pusher", as well as most of the songs from Monster, including three previous top 40 hits, as well as the top 40 hit "Hey Lawdy Mama" from this album.

== Background ==
The song "Hey Lawdy Mama" was recorded in the studio, but edited in a manner to segue directly into "Magic Carpet Ride", thus retaining the album's "live" feel. On original LP copies of Steppenwolf Live, "Hey Lawdy Mama" and "Magic Carpet Ride" are banded together as a single track, with a total running time of 7:13. A differently edited version of "Hey Lawdy Mama", incorporating a fade-out instead of the segue, was released as a single.

The songs "Twisted" and "Corrina, Corrina" are also studio versions which were EQ'd and given some delay effects to match the actual live recordings and overdubbed with audience sounds at the beginning and ending of the songs.

The studio cuts were added by the record company (Dunhill) against the band's wishes to give the album enough tracks to qualify as a double album.

"Hey Lawdy Mama" was covered by the Minutemen on Project Mersh.

== Track listing ==
Side one

1. "Sookie, Sookie" (Don Covay, Steve Cropper) – 3:09
2. "Don't Step on the Grass, Sam" (John Kay) – 6:01
3. "Tighten Up Your Wig" (Kay) – 4:23 (the music is practically identical to Messin' with the Kid, recorded by Junior Wells)

Side two

1. "Monster" (Kay, Jerry Edmonton, Larry Byrom, Nick St. Nicholas) – 9:56
2. "Draft Resister" (Kay, Goldy McJohn, Byrom) – 3:46
3. "Power Play" (Kay) – 5:41

Side three

1. "Corina, Corina" (Mitchell Parish, J. Mayo Williams, B. Chatman) – 4:09 (Studio recording)
2. "Twisted" (Kay) – 5:02 (Studio recording)
3. "From Here to There Eventually" (Kay, McJohn, Edmonton) – 6:40

Side four

1. "Hey Lawdy Mama" (Kay, Byrom, Edmonton) – 2:59 (Studio recording)
2. "Magic Carpet Ride" (Kay, Rushton Moreve) – 4:06
3. "The Pusher" (Hoyt Axton) – 6:02
4. "Born to Be Wild" (Mars Bonfire) – 5:43

== Personnel ==
=== Steppenwolf ===
- John Kay – vocals, guitar, harmonica
- Larry Byrom – guitar
- Nick St. Nicholas – bass guitar, backing vocals
- Goldy McJohn – Hammond organ, piano, backing vocals
- Jerry Edmonton – drums

=== Technical ===
- Gabriel Mekler – producer
- Ray Thompson – engineer
- Tom Gundelfinger – photography, design

== Charts ==
Chart (1971)	Peak position
Australia (Kent Music Report)	16
