= The Second =

Studio album by Steppenwolf
- Released: October 1968
- Recorded: 1968
- Studios: American Recording, Studio City, California
- Genres: Psychedelic rock; blues rock; hard rock
- Length: 40:25
- Label: Dunhill
- Producer: Gabriel Mekler

Steppenwolf chronology
Steppenwolf (1968)	The Second (1968)	At Your Birthday Party (1969)

Singles from The Second
- 1. "Magic Carpet Ride" Released: September 1, 1968

Professional ratings
Review scores
Source	Rating
AllMusic	4.5/5 stars
Rolling Stone	(favorable)

The Second is the second studio album by Canadian-American rock band Steppenwolf, released in October 1968 on ABC Dunhill Records. The album contains one of Steppenwolf's most famous songs, "Magic Carpet Ride". The background of the original ABC LP cover was a shiny "foil", in contrast to later (MCA Records) LP issues and the modern CD sleeve.

Featuring a style that incorporates psychedelic music and hard rock, the release has received critical acclaim both when it came out as well as in later years. AllMusic critic Bruce Eder stated that, though "highly derivative" of their first album, The Second had "very hard and edgy" tracks with the band "in excellent form". It became the band's highest-charting album on the Billboard 200, reaching number three.

The five tracks on side two after "Magic Carpet Ride" consist of a continuous medley.

== Track listing ==
All tracks are written by John Kay, except where indicated.

Side one
No.	Title	Writer(s)	Length
1.	"Faster Than the Speed of Life"	Mars Bonfire	3:10
2.	"Tighten Up Your Wig (melody from "Messin' with the Kid" by Junior Wells)"		3:06
3.	"None of Your Doing"	Kay, Gabriel Mekler	2:50
4.	"Spiritual Fantasy"		3:39
5.	"Don't Step on the Grass, Sam"		5:43

Side two
No.	Title	Writer(s)	Length
1.	"28"	Mekler	3:12
2.	"Magic Carpet Ride"	Kay, Rushton Moreve	4:30
3.	"Disappointment Number (Unknown)"		4:52
4.	"Lost and Found by Trial and Error"		2:07
5.	"Hodge, Podge, Strained Through a Leslie"		2:48
6.	"Resurrection"		2:52
7.	"Reflections"	Kay, Mekler	0:43
Total length:			40:25

== Personnel ==
Steppenwolf

- John Kay – lead vocals, rhythm guitar, harmonica
- Michael Monarch – lead guitar
- Goldy McJohn – organ, piano
- Rushton Moreve – bass
- Jerry Edmonton – drums, vocals, lead vocals on "Faster Than the Speed of Life" and "28", co-lead vocals on "Don't Step on the Grass, Sam"

Technical

- Gabriel Mekler – producer
- Bill Cooper – engineer
- Richard Podolor – engineer
- Gary Burden – art direction, cover design
- Henry Diltz – photography

== Charts ==
=== Weekly charts ===
Chart (1968–69)	Peak position
Canada Top Albums/CDs (RPM)	2
US Billboard 200	3

Singles - Billboard (United States)

Year	Single	Chart	Position
1968	"Magic Carpet Ride"	Hot 100	2

=== Year-end charts ===
Chart (1969)	Position
US Billboard 200	40
