= DYBT =

Radio station in Cebu City, Philippines

Monster Radio Cebu (DYBT)
- Cebu City; Philippines
- Broadcast area: Metro Cebu and surrounding areas
- Frequency: 105.9 MHz
- Branding: Monster BT 105.9

Programming
- Language: English
- Format: CHR/Top 40, OPM
- Network: Monster Radio
- Affiliations: EON Media Group (for Asia Pop 40)

Ownership
- Owner: Audiovisual Communicators, Inc.

History
- First air date: March 1, 1987
- Former call signs: DYMZ (1987–1994); DYWC (1994–2000)
- Former names: Z105 (March 1, 1987-April 3, 1994); Wild FM (April 4, 1994-April 30, 2000)

Technical information
- Licensing authority: NTC
- Power: 10,000 watts
- ERP: 35,000 watts

Links
- Webcast: Listen Live
- Website: www.monstercebu.com

DYBT (105.9 FM), broadcasting as Monster BT 105.9, is a radio station owned and operated by Audiovisual Communicators, Inc. Its studios and transmitter are located at West Entrance, G/F East Aurora Tower, #3 President Quezon (F. Cabahug) St., Kasambagan, Mabolo, Cebu City.

== History ==
Former 105.9 Wild FM logo from 1998 to 2000

The station was established by Capricom Production & Management on March 1, 1987, as Z105 under the call letters DYMZ. On April 4, 1994, UM Broadcasting Network leased the station's airtime and relaunched it as 105.9 Wild FM with a call letters DYWC. It carried a dance-leaning Top 40 format. On May 1, 2000, Audiovisual Communicators acquired the station from Capricom and changed its call letters to DYBT; while the next two years, Wild FM moved to the then-newly acquired 103.5 FM (later becoming Retro Cebu since 2015). As a result, it rebranded as Monster Radio BT 105.9 with a Top 40 format. In 2016, the station transferred from Mango Square Mall to its current location in East Aurora Tower and adopted its current slogan "Cebu's Hottest", the catchphrase used by its flagship station in Manila.

== Recognitions ==
In the previous years, Monster Radio BT 105.9 has been nominated as Best FM Station (Provincial) until the station won the category at the 25th KBP Golden Dove Awards in 2017.
