= DWKC-FM =

Radio station in Metro Manila, Philippines

iFM Manila (DWKC)
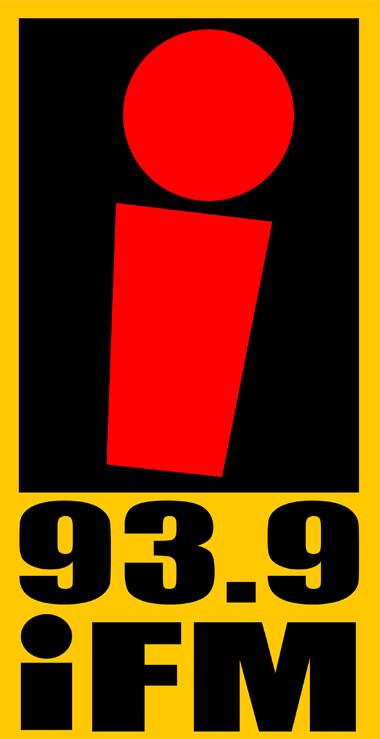
- San Juan; Philippines
- Broadcast area: Mega Manila and surrounding areas
- Frequency: 93.9 MHz
- RDS: 1. 93.9 iFM; 2. Ang iDol; 3. Kong FM
- Branding: 93.9 iFM

Programming
- Language: Filipino
- Format: Contemporary MOR, OPM
- Network: iFM
- Affiliations: RMN News (for RMN Network News)

Ownership
- Owner: Radio Mindanao Network
- Sister stations: DZXL News 558

History
- First air date: December 6, 1975
- Former call signs: DZHP (1975–1985)
- Call sign meaning: Ka Henry Canoy (founder)

Technical information
- Licensing authority: NTC
- Class: C/D/E
- Power: 25,000 watts
- ERP: 75,000 watts
- Repeater: Boracay: DYBS 98.1 MHz

Links
- Webcast: Listen Live
- Website: iFM Manila

DWKC (93.9 FM), broadcasting as 93.9 iFM, is a radio station owned and operated by the Radio Mindanao Network. The station's studio is located at the RMN Broadcast Center, Unit 807, 8th Floor, Atlanta Centre, Annapolis St., Greenhills, San Juan, Metro Manila, and its transmitter is located at No. 25 Sumulong Highway, Barangay Santa Cruz, Antipolo.

As of Q4 2022, 93.9 iFM is the 5th most-listened to FM radio station in Metro Manila, based on a survey commissioned by Kantar Media Philippines and Kapisanan ng mga Brodkaster ng Pilipinas.

== History ==
=== 1975-1985: DZHP ===
The station was established in 1975 as the second RMN FM station.

=== 1985–1999: WKC ===
It was rebranded as 93.9 WKC on May 16, 1985, a C-D-E market radio station with famous taglines including "We are family". It was managed by Mike Enriquez†, at that time known as "Baby Michael", along with former WBL DJs Hillbilly Willy, Rudolf Rivera, Ray "The Count" Mambo, Super Mitch. Enriquez left in 1995 for GMA Network to prepare for its election coverage. He then became widely popular by his new monicker Mr. Saksi. Since then, he was replaced by Bobby Ante. 93.9 WKC's operations were at the Philcomcen Bldg. in Ortigas Center, Pasig. It played pop music through its existence, with DJs speaking in English.

In 1997, on its 12th anniversary, WKC made a minor reformat by adding family-related segments. Ante stated that the station is "after the family niche" to project the station's positive image. On November 22, 1999, at 11:00 pm, WKC signed off.

=== 1999–2002: KCFM ===
On November 23, 1999, at 6:00 am, 93.9 FM reformatted as 939 KCFM (pronounced as "ninety-three-nine"), now catering to the A-B market, with its slogan "Live It Up!" Among its notable DJs were Chico and Delamar (currently from Monster Radio RX 93.1) and King DJ Logan. On May 15, 2002, 939 KCFM signed off for the last time.

=== 2002–present: iFM ===
Logo of 93.9 iFM from 2009 to 2014

Logo of 93.9 iFM from 2015 to 2017

On May 16, 2002, 93.9 FM reformatted back to a C-D-E market radio station, known as 93.9 iFM with its first slogan Hit after hit, iFM. The station was headed by Fred M. Davis, who became responsible for making 102.7 Star FM, and Yes FM 101.1 successful stations.

In February 2004 it changed slogans to Ang FM ko I and their slogan from 2006 to 2009 was Pwede! (English: (It) Can Be!), with a new jingle. In June 2007, 93.9 iFM was the first commercial station in the country to broadcast with HD Radio technology. It broadcast in three HD Radio digital audio channels along with its pre-existing analog signal. The operation of its facility was in high-level combined hybrid mode with an existing 35 kW analog transmitter, a new Nautel 1 kW HD Radio transmitter, with the digital exciter, importer and exporter providing the digital signal component. In June 2008, iFM launched another tagline Pinalakas!, as a result. As the Makati studios were transferred to Atlanta Center in San Juan, RMN's sister station DZXL and its studios remained in Makati until April 15, 2023, DZXL moved its studios and offices to Atlanta Center in San Juan.

In March 2009, iFM changed its logo as well as the slogan to Sa iFM Siguradong Enjoy Ka! (At iFM, You Will Surely Enjoy!) along with a new 7-note jingle. By January 2010, iFM also launched a new campaign as "Ang Bago Mong FM" (Your New FM) with new DJs, new programs, internet promotions and the addition of new talents like Megandang Megan, Nikka Dyosa, Kara Lambingera (Klariz Magboo), YouTube sensations Kuya Jobert and Sir Rex Kantatero, iFM continued to bring quality entertainment to the metro. On May 10, 2011, the popular program "Itanong Mo kay Kuya Jobert" was replaced by "Itanong Mo sa Mga Tikbalang" featuring new jocks Charlie Bagin and Markang Bungal known as the duo "Tambalang Tikbalang". The former was replaced due to Kuya Jobert's hectic schedule.

In late 2011, the station launched a new slogan called Ambot sa Kambing na may Bangs! (English: Ask the Goat with Bangs!). Since then, iFM's official monicker is "Kakambing".

Since 2014, it changed slogans from Ang Radyo Ko, iFM, Hiyang na Eh? to i Ang Saya!, and 2015 from Promise to Kamote (coined from its flagship morning program, Kamote Club). At this time, YouTube sensation Lloyd Cadena served as DJ until Summer 2015. June 1, 2015, saw the return of Celine Labuyo (from 106.7 Energy FM) as Nikka Loka, and its new slogan #RamdamKita.

On November 9, 2015, 93.9 iFM and its provincial stations launched its new logo and slogan, Ang Bestfriend Mo!

On June 12, 2017, 93.9 iFM launched its new slogan, i Nako!. However, they later dropped that slogan in favor of KLASiK (English: Classic), along with the return of the 7-note sound mnemonic used from 2009 to 2014.

During the second quarter of 2018, iFM changed its slogan to Ang Idol Mong FM while at the same time, it began simulcasting RMN's flagship network newscast from DZXL, similar to its rival 102.7 Star FM of Bombo Radyo Philippines. On July 30, 2018, 93.9 iFM started using a logo which resembles the 2002 logo, while the 2015 logo will be retained for iFM regional stations, though it removed the slogan from the logo.

On February 14, 2022, iFM launched its own drama program called "Dear iFM".

On October 7, 2022, iFM launched its on top songs program called "Bulls-i".

In June 2025, iFM won “Best FM Radio Station” at the 28th KBP Golden Dove Award.

From March to November 2026, due to the impact of the increase in oil prices, iFM reduced its daily round-the-clock operations to 21 hours.

== Notable on-air talent ==
=== Former ===
- Mike Enriquez
- Lloyd Cadena
