= Monstrum =

Monstrum may refer to:

- Latin monstrum, an unnatural portent and the origin of the English word monster
- Monstrum (film), a 2018 Korean film
- Vriesea monstrum, a bromeliad plant species
- AZX-Monstrum, a computer project
- Monstrum, a 2015 survival horror video game published by Soedesco
  - Monstrum 2, a 2022 multiplayer survival horror video game and sequel to the above
- Monstrum, a novel by Donald James
- "Monstrum", a short story by J. N. Williamson
- An element in the game Tomb Raider: The Angel of Darkness
- ”Monstrum”, a documentary on monsters published by PBS
