= Atlanta Centre =

- View of Atlanta Centre from BSA Twin Towers Ortigas Center
- Interactive map of the Atlanta Centre area

General information
- Status: Completed
- Type: Office
- Location: 31 Annapolis Street, Greenhills, San Juan, Metro Manila, Philippines
- Coordinates: 14°36′17″N 121°03′11″E
- Construction started: 1996; 30 years ago
- Completed: 2000; 26 years ago
- Opened: June 14, 2000; 26 years ago
- Inaugurated: June 14, 2000; 26 years ago
- Owner: Atlanta Land Corporation
- Operator: Radio Mindanao Network

Height
- Antenna spire: 179 m (587.3 ft)

Technical details
- Floor count: 35 above ground
- Lifts/elevators: 6

Design and construction
- Developer: Atlanta Land Corporation

The Atlanta Centre is an office skyscraper in San Juan, Metro Manila, Philippines. It is also the highest building in the city with a total height of 179 metres from the ground to its architectural spire. The building houses DWWW 774, DZXL 558 RMN Manila & 93.9 iFM

The building has 35 floors above ground, including a 10-level parking area. It has 6 Otis elevators, and is equipped with a centralized PABX/ LAN communication networks plus a Building Management System (BMS).

== Location ==
The Atlanta Centre, together with the 27 Annapolis and The One Beverly Place.

The Atlanta Centre is located along Annapolis Street, well inside the Greenhills area and the city's only skyline area. It is also just a stone throw away from the well-known Greenhills Shopping Center.

In 2023, Radio Mindanao Network, the owner of DZXL 558 RMN Manila and 93.9 iFM, moved to the eighth floor of the building. The new office has two studios in #31 Annapolis Street, Greenhills, San Juan, Metro Manila last April 17, 2023 (one for the FM station and one for AM station), as well as technical rooms for AM/FM radio broadcasting and offices for anchors and management.

== Incidents ==
Atlanta Centre was known as the place where Nida Blanca, a well-known Filipino actress, was found dead on 7 November 2001. She was found inside a car in the building's parking area.

At about 6:00 AM on 16 December 2008, a fire broke out on the 7th floor of the building. No one was reported injured since office workers have not yet arrived in the area. The building's curtain walls on the said level were destroyed by fire fighters for the trapped smoke to come out.

== See also ==
- San Juan
