= Rock Me (Steppenwolf song) =

1969 song by Steppenwolf

- Danish single sleeve

Single by Steppenwolf

from the album At Your Birthday Party
- B-side: "Jupiter Child"
- Released: February 22, 1969
- Genre: Rock
- Length: 3:45
- Label: ABC
- Songwriter: John Kay
- Producer: Gabriel Mekler

Steppenwolf singles chronology
"Magic Carpet Ride" (1968)	"Rock Me" (1969)	"It's Never Too Late" (1969)

"Rock Me" is a song by the Canadian-American hard rock band Steppenwolf. It was released on their 1969 album At Your Birthday Party. It was written by the band's lead singer John Kay, and was the band's fifth American single release. The song was produced by Gabriel Mekler and released as a single in 1969, originally as the B-side to "Jupiter Child", but the sides were later flipped. It peaked at #10 on the Hot 100 on April 19, 1969 and #6 on both WLS and WCFL. It was both Billboard's and Cashbox's top debut the week of March 1, 1969. The song is considered the highlight of the album though it had been released for the soundtrack well ahead of the album. The song followed on the heels of the band's two 1968 hits, "Born to Be Wild" which peaked at #2 and "Magic Carpet Ride" which peaked at #3. Cash Box particularly praised the "pulverizing vocal performance."

Dave Grusin used the song when he scored the 1968 psychedelic sex farce movie Candy, in which it is the culmination to the soundtrack. Steppenwolf performed the song on the January 5, 1969, episode of The Smothers Brothers Comedy Hour and on the German Beat-Club. The song later appeared in the band's live albums Live at 25 released in 1995 and Live in Louisville released in 2004 as well as all of the band's compilation albums.

Way Back Attack ranks it #31 on its list of the Top 100 Psychedelic Hits of 1966–1969.

In his book Die at the Right Time!: A Subjective Cultural History of the American Sixties, Erik v. d. Luft noted the surprising theme from the all-male band, fronted by John Kay's gruff voice "complaining that a woman was being objectified for sex."

Cash Box described the original A-side, "Jupiter Child" as sounding "steel-hard on the sole basis of the distinctive lead vocal and smouldering instrumentation" despite a relatively slow tempo.

== Chart history ==
=== Weekly charts ===
Chart (1969)	Peak position
Canada RPM Top Singles	4
US Billboard Hot 100	10

=== Year-end charts ===
Chart (1969)	Rank
Canada RPM Top Singles for 1969	90
US Cash Box	81
