= Daniel Ruczko =

German film director and artist

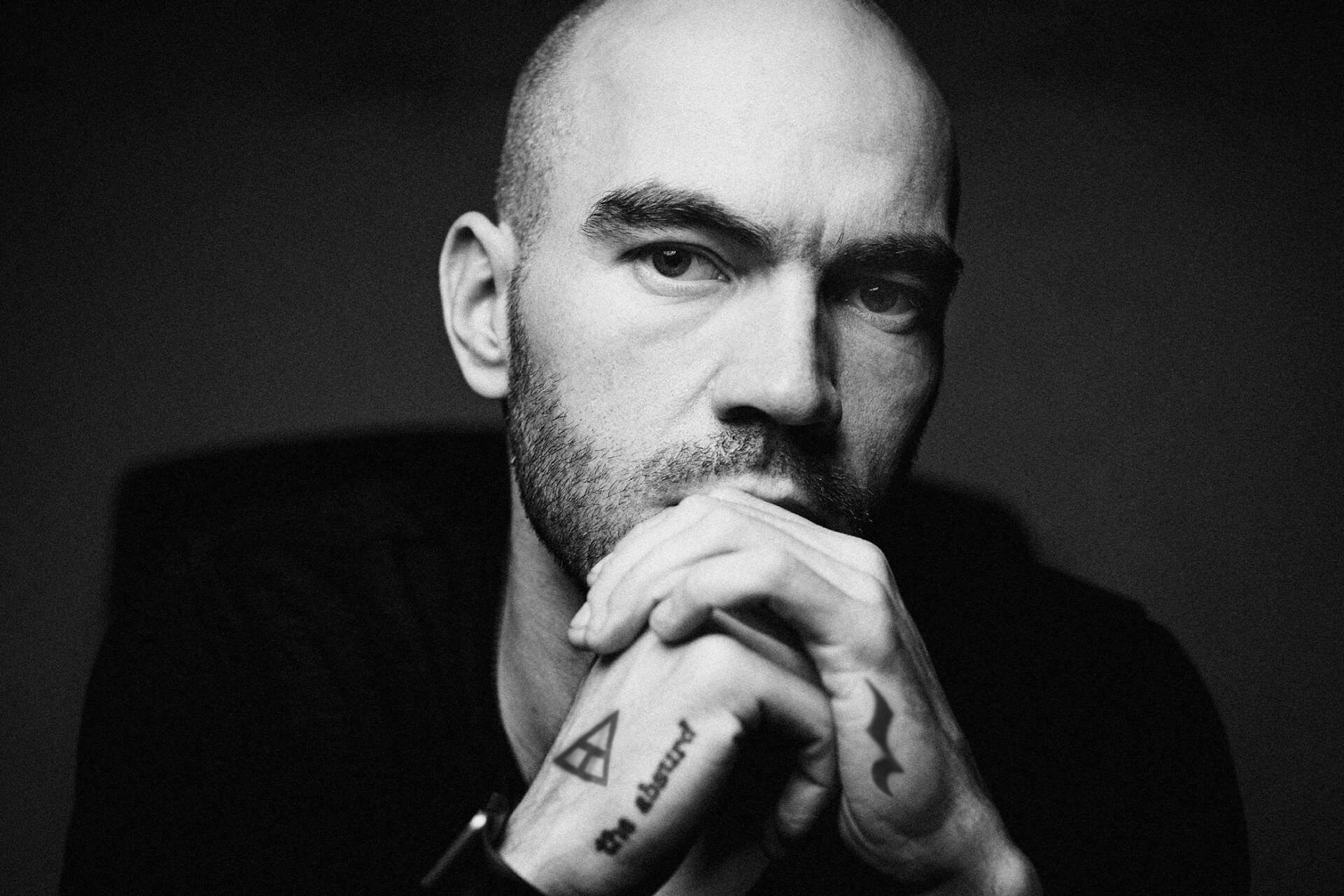
- Ruczko in 2019
- Born: July 3, 1982 (age 44); Bremen, Germany
- Other names: Rusher, Andrew Gony
- Occupations: Director, composer, screenwriter, film producer, author, music producer, sound designer, 3D/Digital Artist, author
- Years active: 2003–present
- Website: www.danielruczko.com

Daniel Ruczko (born 3 July 1982) is a director, author, composer, writer and music producer.
He started producing music at the age of 12 on his Amiga 500 computer using the software Protracker, a couple of years later that lead to a career as an internationally known DJ and producer.

After spending most of his twenties releasing records on numerous labels and touring the globe as a DJ, in 2010 Ruczko went to a music school in Hamburg, Germany to become a Film Music composer.

In the same year he won an award for the concept of his short film "Bipolar - A Narration of Manic Depression" which was chosen by the German actor Matthias Schweighöfer.
"Bipolar" got Daniel a lot of attention and also his first awards.
.

Throughout his creative career, Daniel has received over 60 awards for his films, three of which have been screened at the Short Film Corner of the Cannes Film Festival.

Ruczko works on commercials and music videos under his company name Misfit Media, as well as film projects under his company name Mind Pollution Pictures.

In 2018 Daniel moved to Los Angeles to work as a film director, author and producer.

He still composes and also produces all the music for a Hip hop group that he is a member of, together with the Rappers "Kayohes", "V3rb" & "Steez". He also still produces various styles of electronic music

According to IMDb Ruczko is currently working on a feature film with the writer Michael Reisz (Truth or Dare) that is believed to have a budget of 7 million dollars.

In July 2023, Ruczko published his first novel entitled "Pieces of a Broken Mind", which according to him includes some autobiographical elements.

== Short Film filmography ==
Year	Title	Director	Writer	Producer	Notes
2010	Evacuation	Yes	Yes	Yes	Also editor, sound designer and visual FX
2011	Bipolar: A Narration of Manic Depression	Yes	Yes	Yes	Also composer, actor, editor, sound designer and visual FX
2013	Wake Up!	Yes	Yes	Yes	Also composer, editor, sound designer and visual FX
2014	Let Go	Yes	Yes	Yes	Also composer, editor, sound designer and visual FX
2015	Duality	Yes	Yes	Yes	Also composer, editor, sound designer and visual FX
2015	Solitary	Yes	Yes	Yes	Also composer, editor, sound designer and visual FX
2018	Intrusive Thoughts	Yes	Yes	Yes	Also composer, editor, sound designer, voice actor and visual FX

== Short Film filmography ==
Year	Title	Director	Writer	Producer	Notes
2026	Who Put That There?	Yes	Yes	Yes	Also editor, sound designer and visual FX

== Film Accolades ==
Year	Film	Festival Awards	
Year	Film	Nominations	Wins
2010	Evacuation		
2011	Bipolar: A Narration of Manic Depression	3	2
2013	Wake Up!	5	5
2014	Let Go	4	3
2015	Duality	24	18
2015	Solitary	35	30
2018	Intrusive Thoughts	3	3
Total		74	61

== Music Video filmography ==
Year	Artist	Title	Label	Director	Cinematographer
2011	Bionic Stylz Feat. Warpath	"Musik"	Bionic Styles	Yes	Yes
2012	Kayohes	"Stranger"	83 Sound	Yes	Yes
2012	V3rb	"Tiger"	83 Sound	Yes	Yes
2012	Kayohes	"Journey"	83 Sound	Yes	Yes
2012	V3rb	"Streets Talk"	83 Sound	Yes	Yes
2012	V3rb	"Standing Ovation"	83 Sound	Yes	Yes
2013	Gods Of Chaos	"City Of Lost Angels"	Psycho Realm	Yes	Yes
2013	Misleeding	"Darkside"	Keep The Feel	Yes	Yes
2014	Steez	"Rottweiler Flow"	Machtworte	Yes	Yes
2014	V3rb	"Ah Yeah"	83 Sound	Yes	Yes
2014	Steez	"Rap Ist"	Machtworte	Yes	Yes
2014	Ryu	"Did it To Myself"	Demigodz	Yes	Yes
2015	Absztrakkt & Snowgoons Feat. Cr7z	"Bodhishinobi"	58 Muzik	Yes	Yes
2015	Kayohes, V3rb & Rusher	"March On"	Origu	Yes	Yes
2015	2Seiten	"Regenwetter / Scheiße Schön"	58 Muzik	Yes	Yes
2015	Cr7z	"Sohn Des Drachen"	58 Muzik	Yes	Yes
2015	Cr7z	"Verantwortung"	58 Muzik	Yes	Yes
2016	Andy Cooper & The Allergies	"Rock Rock"	Unique Records	Yes	Yes
2017	Andy Cooper & The Allergies	"The Love That I'm In"	Jalapeno Records	Yes	Yes
2017	Andy Cooper & The Allergies	"Main Event"	Jalapeno Records	Yes	Yes
2017	Cr7z	"Polytoxikomanie"	Arjuna	Yes	Yes
2018	Andy Cooper	"Can't Be Satisfied"	Rocafort Records	Yes	Yes
2018	The Allergies	"Dance Now"	Jalapeno Records	Yes	Yes
2019	The Allergies feat. Andy Cooper	"Too Much"	Jalapeno Records	Yes	Yes
2020	Rusher, Kayohes & V3rb	"Back On The Scene"	Arjuna	Yes	Yes
2020	Rusher, Kayohes & V3rb	"A Better Place"	Arjuna	Yes	Yes
2020	Rusher, Kayohes & V3rb	"Manic Narration"	Arjuna	Yes	Yes
2020	Rusher & Kayohes	"Decade"	Misfit Music	Yes	Yes
2020	Steez & Rusher	"Outro 2020"	DUM Enterprises	Yes	Yes
2020	Rusher & Kayohes	"Right Minds Feat. V3rb"	Misfit Music	Yes	Yes
2021	Rusher & V3rb	"Genetics"	Misfit Music	Yes	Yes
2022	Neonlight	"Desire"	Blackout	Yes	Yes
2022	Rusher & Steez	"Legendary"	Misfit Music	Yes	Yes
2022	Rusher, V3rb, Steez & Kayohes	"Too Locked In"	Misfit Music	Yes	Yes
2023	Rusher & Steez	"One By One feat. Kayohes & V3rb"	Arjuna	Yes	Yes

== Bibliography ==
Year	Title	Genre
2022	I Saw You in a Dream Last Night	Art Book
2022	Christmas Nightmare	Art Book
2023	This is NOT a Children's Book!	Art Book
2023	Aliens Are The Better Humans	Art Book
2023	Evil Clowns Are People Too	Art Book
2023	Quit Hating on Satan	Art Book
July 2023	Pieces of a Broken Mind	Fiction / Novel
February 2025	Scherben einer zerbrochenen Seele (German Version of "Pieces of a Broken Mind")	Fiction / Novel
May 2025	Purgatory	Fiction / Horror / Novel

== Music ==
=== Musical beginnings ===
At the age of 8, Daniel learned to play the accordion, but gave it up after three years.

When he was 12 years old he started producing Hardcore Techno music on his Amiga 500 using Protracker, he later switched to the PC using FastTracker 2. In 1997 he bought his first set of Turntables and taught himself how to DJ.

In 1999 Ruczko got interested in Drum and Bass and decided to make that his new genre, at first he used Fruity Loops to experiment but pretty quickly found his new home in Steinberg Cubase, which is still his main Software for music today.

He established himself as a serious DJ and producer, known for his cinematic and dark sound, and played over 450 gigs in his DJing career.

=== Misfit Music ===
"Misfit Music" or "Rusher, Kayohes & V3rb" is a Hip hop group entirely produced by Ruczko, with him also directing their music videos.
After releasing the single "Some Way, Some How / March On" on Origu in 2015, the group is in the process of finishing up their debut Album with the title "Ordinary Madness" which is expected to be released in 2019.

== Discography as Rusher ==
Year	Title	Label	Genre	Release Type
2003	Rusher & Penny Wize - Chrome Depot	Lifeline Records	Drum and Bass	Vinyl
2006	Rusher - The Suffering (Part of the Shades of Black LP)	Barcode Recordings	Drum and Bass	Vinyl & Digital
2006	Rusher - Prophecy (Part of the Juiceblender LP)	Citrus Recordings	Drum and Bass	Vinyl & Digital
2008	Jade & Rusher - Silent Hell	Close 2 Death Recordings	Drum and Bass	Vinyl & Digital
2008	Jade & Rusher - Silent Hell (Bullet Proof Remix)	Close 2 Death Recordings	Drum and Bass	Vinyl & Digital
2008	Rusher - Counting To Infinity / Impact	Disturbed Recordings	Drum and Bass	Vinyl & Digital
2010	Rusher - Blood Theme / Lithium	Citrus Recordings	Drum and Bass	Digital
2010	Rusher & Dubtek - Godsplitters	Trust in Music	Drum and Bass	Vinyl & Digital
2011	Rusher - Sundays	Digital Sanctuary Recordings	Deep Dubstep	Digital
2012	Rusher - Rust	Mindtech Recordings	Drum and Bass	Digital
2015	Rusher, Kayohes & V3rb - Some Way, Some How / March On	Origu	Hip hop / Rap	Vinyl
2019	Rusher - "No Thoughts" Part One	Self Released	Half Time	Digital
2020	Rusher, Kayohes & V3rb - "Back On The Scene - Single"	Arjuna	Hip hop / Rap	Digital
2020	Rusher, Kayohes & V3rb - "A Better Place - Single"	Arjuna	Hip hop / Rap	Digital
2020	Rusher - "One Of A Kind - Single"	Black Lodge Audio	Electronic / Halftime	Digital
2020	Rusher, Kayohes & V3rb - "Manic Narration - Single"	Arjuna	Hip hop / Rap	Digital
2020	Rusher & Kayohes - "Melancholia" - Album	Misfit Music	Hip hop / Rap	Digital
2020	Rusher, Kayohes & V3rb - "Nightmares & Dreams feat. Andy Cooper - Single"	Arjuna	Hip hop / Rap	Digital
2020	Rusher - "Mind Polluter EP"	Black Lodge Audio	Electronic / Halftime	Digital
2020	Rusher, Kayohes & V3rb - "Ordinary Madness Feat. Cr7Z - Single"	Arjuna	Hip hop / Rap	Digital
2020	Rusher, Kayohes & V3rb - "Ordinary Madness - Album"	Arjuna	Hip hop / Rap	Digital / CD
2020	Rusher & Steez - "5 Minuten Ruhe im Kopf - Single"	Arjuna	Hip hop / Rap	Digital
2020	Rusher, Kayohes & V3rb - "Ordinary Madness - Instrumentals"	Arjuna	Hip hop / Rap	Digital
2020	Steez & Rusher - "STZ Remixes - EP"	D.U.M.	Hip hop / Rap	Digital
2020	Rusher - "Do You Like Hurting Other People? (L 33 Remix) / (Nanokosmos Remix)"	Black Lodge Audio	Electronic / Halftime	Digital
2020	Rusher - "Follow The Bleeder EP"	Black Lodge Audio	Electronic / Halftime	Digital
2020	Steez & Rusher - "STZ Remixes - EP Instrumentals"	D.U.M.	Hip hop / Rap	Digital
2020	Rusher & Kayohes - "Right Minds Feat. V3rb - Single"	Misfit Music	Hip hop / Rap	Digital
2020	Rusher - "Watch The World Burn"	Black Lodge Audio	Electronic / Halftime	Digital
2020	Rusher & Kayohes - "Martial Law Feat. Andy Cooper - Single"	Misfit Music	Hip hop / Rap	Digital
2020	Rusher & Kayohes - "From Where I Was - Single"	Misfit Music	Hip hop / Rap	Digital
2020	Maks_SF & Rusher - "Bushido - Single"	Kato OST	Electronic	Digital
2021	Rusher & Kayohes - "The Vision - Single"	Misfit Music	Hip hop / Rap	Digital
2021	Rusher - "Kernel Panic - Kato OST - Single"	Black Lodge Audio	Electronic / Techno	Digital
2021	Rusher & Kayohes - "Serious - Single"	Misfit Music	Hip hop / Rap	Digital
2021	Rusher & Kayohes - "Purpose - Single"	Misfit Music	Hip hop / Rap	Digital
2021	Rusher - "Broken - Single"	Black Lodge Audio	Electronic / Halftime	Digital
2021	Rusher & Kayohes - "Mindfold - Album"	Misfit Music	Hip hop / Rap	Digital
2021	Rusher & Kayohes - "Mindfold (Instrumentals) - Album"	Misfit Music	Hip hop / Rap	Digital
2021	Rusher - "Anti-Hero - Kato OST - Single"	Black Lodge Audio	Electronic / Techno	Digital
2021	P4ste - "Felister (Rusher Remix) - Single"	Black Lodge Audio	Electronic / Halftime	Digital
2021	Rusher & V3rb - "You know my... Feat. Steez - Single"	Misfit Music	Hip hop / Rap	Digital
2021	Rusher & V3rb - "Genetics - Single"	Misfit Music	Hip hop / Rap	Digital
2021	Rusher & V3rb - "The Process - Single"	Misfit Music	Hip hop / Rap	Digital
2021	Rusher & V3rb - "L.A. Lies Feat. Andy Cooper - Single"	Misfit Music	Hip hop / Rap	Digital
2021	Rusher & V3rb - "Misfits With Attitude - Album"	Misfit Music	Hip hop / Rap	Digital / CD
2021	Rusher & V3rb - "Misfits With Attitude Instrumentals - Album"	Misfit Music	Hip hop / Rap	Digital
2021	Rusher - "Demonology - Single"	Black Lodge Audio	Electronic / Halftime	Digital
2022	Rusher - "Lobotomizer - Single"	Black Lodge Audio	Electronic / Halftime	Digital
2022	Rusher, V3rb, Kayohes & Steez - "Dead On Arrival - Single"	Misfit Music	Hip hop / Rap	Digital
2022	Rusher & Kayohes - "This is Why I'm Breathing - Single"	Misfit Music	Hip hop / Rap	Digital
2022	Rusher - "Postcards From The Future - Album"	Black Lodge Audio	Electronic / Halftime	Digital / CD / Vinyl
2022	Rusher - Ancient Future (Part of the "DIVERGENCE IV" LP)	Eatbrain	Drum and Bass	Digital
2022	Rusher, V3rb, Steez & Kayohes - Misfit DNA - Album"	Misfit Music	Hip Hop / Rap	Digital
2022	Lara Loft - The Enemy Within (Rusher Remix) - Single"	Black Lodge Audio	Electronic / Halftime	Digital
2023	Rusher - Black Hoodies - Single"	Black Lodge Audio	Drum and Bass	Digital
2023	Rusher, V3rb, Steez & Kayohes - Misfit DNA - Instrumental Album"	Misfit Music	Hip Hop / Rap	Digital
2023	Rusher & Steez - One by One feat. Kayohes & V3rb (Single)"	Arjuna	Hip Hop / Rap	Digital
2023	Rusher & Steez - Avatare (Single)	Arjuna	Hip Hop / Rap	Digital
2023	Rusher & Steez - Legendary (Single)"	Arjuna	Hip Hop / Rap	Digital
2023	Rusher - Postcards from the Future Remixes - Part 1 (Album)"	Black Lodge Audio	Electronic / Halftime	Digital
2023	Rusher & Steez - InnenLeben (Album)"	Arjuna	Hip Hop / Rap	Digital
2023	Rusher - Step Aside (Single)"	Black Lodge Audio	Electronic / Halftime	Digital
2023	Rusher & Steez - InnenLeben Instrumentals (Album)"	Arjuna	Hip Hop / Rap	Digital
2023	Rusher & Kayohes - Took A Lot Of Years (Single)"	Misfit Music	Hip Hop / Rap	Digital
2023	Rusher & Kayohes - NES and Tape Deck (Single)"	Misfit Music	Hip Hop / Rap	Digital
2024	Rusher & Kayohes - Euphoria (Album)"	Misfit Music	Hip Hop / Rap	Digital
2024	Rusher & Kayohes - Euphoria - Instrumentals (Album)"	Misfit Music	Hip Hop / Rap	Digital
2024	Rusher - Anhedonia (Single)"	DISRUPT	Drum and Bass	Digital
2024	Rusher - Harmonic Dissonance (Album)"	DISRUPT	Drum and Bass	Digital
2024	Rusher - Picture Perfect (Single)"	DISRUPT	Drum and Bass	Digital
2025	Rusher & Kayohes - The Sky Is The goal (Single)"	Misfit Music	Rap	Digital
2026	Rusher - Anhedonia VIP (Single)"	DISRUPT	Drum and Bass	Digital

== Discography as Daniel Ruczko ==
Year	Title	Label	Genre	Release Type
2012	Daniel Ruczko - Sommer's Winter	Mind Pollution Recordings	Film Score	Digital
2012	Daniel Ruczko - Wake Up!	Mind Pollution Recordings	Film Score	Digital
2014	Daniel Ruczko - (There Is No) Me & You	Mind Pollution Recordings	Film Score	Digital
2014	Daniel Ruczko - Opal "End Credits"	Mind Pollution Recordings	Film Score	Digital
2014	Daniel Ruczko - Reunion (Duality Score)	Mind Pollution Recordings	Film Score	Digital
2019	Daniel Ruczko - The Weeping - Theme feat. Monique Candelaria	Mind Pollution Recordings	Film Score	Digital
2019	Daniel Ruczko - Solitary	Mind Pollution Recordings	Film Score	Digital
2019	Daniel Ruczko - Bipolar - A Narration Of Manic Depression	Mind Pollution Recordings	Film Score	Digital
2020	Daniel Ruczko - Intrusive Thoughts	Mind Pollution Recordings	Film Score	TBA
