= Moonstar =

Moonstar can refer to:

- Moonstar88, a female-fronted musical group from the Philippines
- Danielle Moonstar (also known by the codenames Moonstar, Psyche and Mirage), a fictional character in the Marvel Comics X-Men franchise
- The Moonstars, a fictional organization in the Forgotten Realms, derived from the Harpers
- Moonstar, originally published as Moonstar Odyssey, a science fiction novel by David Gerrold
- Moonbyul, Korean singer and rapper
