= Monsters: History's Most Evil Men and Women =

2008 book by Simon Sebag Montefiore

- Author: Simon Sebag Montefiore
- Language: English
- Subject: History
- Genre: Non-fiction
- Publisher: Quercus
- Publication date: 2008
- Publication place: United Kingdom
- Media type: Paperback
- Pages: 320
- ISBN: 9781847248039

Monsters: History's Most Evil Men and Women is a 2008 non-fiction history book by the British Historian Simon Sebag Montefiore, who also wrote 'Jerusalem: The Biography', 'Young Stalin', and 'Heroes - History's Greatest Men and Women', to which this book is a counter.

The book discusses the lives of many historical figures, infamous for their deeds, ranging from Ivan the Terrible who killed his son, to Pol Pot the brutal dictator who strove to forge a country of only farmers, wiping out almost half of his subjects.
