= Vriesea monstrum =

Scientific classification
- Kingdom: Plantae
- Clade: Tracheophytes
- Clade: Angiosperms
- Clade: Monocots
- Clade: Commelinids
- Order: Poales
- Family: Bromeliaceae
- Genus: Vriesea
- Species: V. monstrum

Binomial name
- Vriesea monstrum (Mez) L.B. Smith

Synonyms
- Tillandsia monstrum Mez

Species of flowering plant

Vriesea monstrum is a plant species in the genus Vriesea. This species is native to Costa Rica, Nicaragua, Panama, Colombia, and Ecuador.
