= Rock & Roll Rebels =

Studio album by John Kay and Steppenwolf
- Released: 1987
- Recorded: 1987
- Studio: Phantom Sound (Room A), Los Angeles
- Genre: Rock
- Length: 41:30
- Label: Qwil
- Producer: John Kay; Rocket Ritchotte; Michael Wilk

John Kay and Steppenwolf chronology
Paradox (1984)	Rock & Roll Rebels (1987)	Rise & Shine (1990)

Feed the Fire
- 1996 reissue packaging

Professional ratings
Review scores
Source	Rating
AllMusic	4.5/5 stars

Rock & Roll Rebels is the twelfth album by John Kay and Steppenwolf. It was released in 1987, as Qwil Catalog # NU 1560. The LP was distributed by Dominion Entertainment, Inc., and the CD and cassette were distributed by K-tel International (USA), Inc.

It was reissued in 1996 as Feed the Fire, in a remixed form on the Winter Harvest label. The reissue did not include "Turn Out The Lights" and "Give Me Life," but added two new songs, "Feed the Fire" and "Bad Attitude".

== Track listing ==
1. "Give Me Life" (John Kay, Rocket Ritchotte, Michael Wilk) – 4:16 (*replaced by "Feed The Fire" in 1996 reissue)
2. "Rock & Roll Rebels" (Kay, Ritchotte, Wilk) – 4:00
3. "Hold On (Never Give Up, Never Give In)" (Kay, Ritchotte, Wilk) – 5:15
4. "Man On A Mission" (Kay, Wilk) – 4:01
5. "Everybody Knows You" (Kay, Wilk) – 3:22
6. "Rock Steady (I'm Rough and Ready)" (Kay, Wilk) – 3:52
7. "Replace the Face" (Alan O'Day) – 3:39
8. "Turn Out the Lights" (Kay, Raposa, Ritchotte) – 4:55 (*replaced by "Bad Attitude" in 1996 reissue)
9. "Give Me News I Can Use" (Kay) – 3:44
10. "Rage" (Kay, Ritchotte, Wilk) – 4:24

== Personnel ==
=== Musicians ===
- John Kay – lead vocals, guitar
- Rocket Ritchotte – lead guitar, backing vocals
- Michael Wilk – keyboards, bass guitar, programming
- Ron Hurst – drums, backing vocals

=== Technical ===
- Mike Reese – mastering
- Stanley Mouse – cover art
- Amy Epa – photography

== Charts ==
Chart performance for Rock & Roll Rebels
Chart (1987)	Peak position
US Billboard 200	171
