= The Sparrows (band) =

1960s Canadian rock band

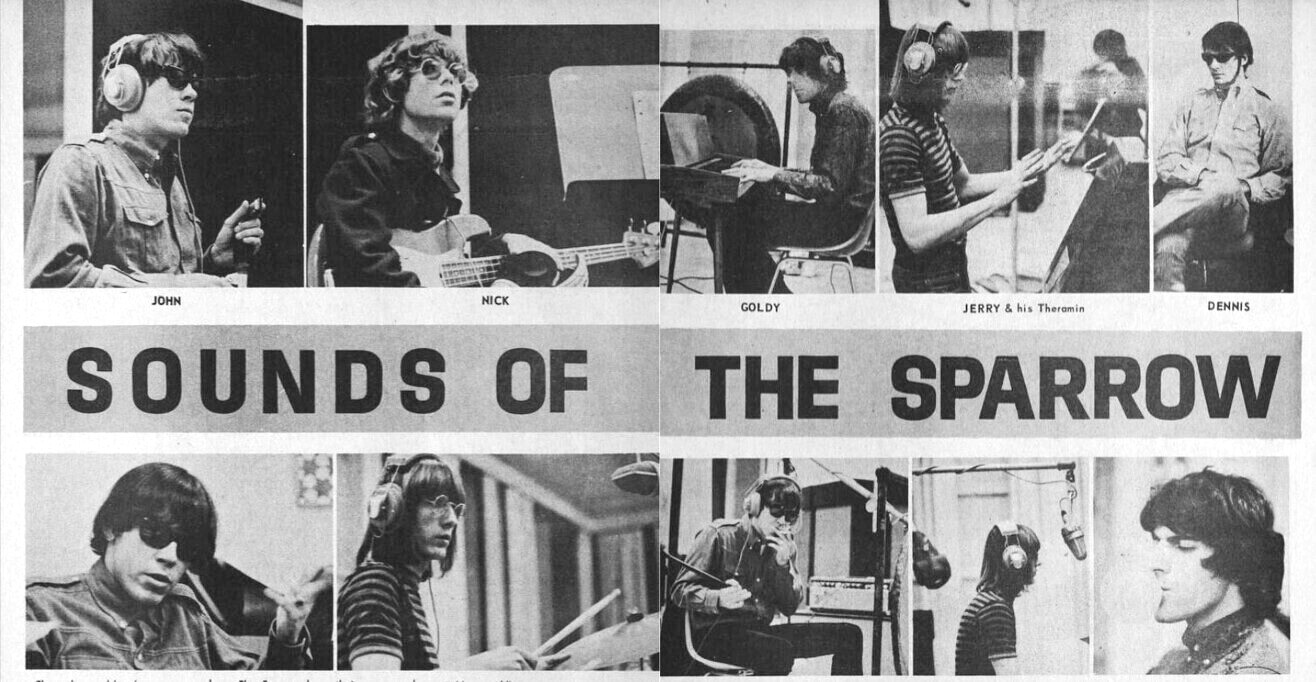
- The Sparrows in the April 1967 issue of Hit Parader

Background information
- Also known as: Jack London & the Sparrows; Sparrow
- Origin: Oshawa, Ontario, Canada
- Genres: Blues rock; psychedelic rock
- Years active: 1964–1967
- Labels: Capitol; RCA; EMI; Columbia
- Spinoffs: Steppenwolf
- Past members: Jack London; Dennis Edmonton; Dave Hare; Brent Maitland; Jerry Edmonton; C.J. Feeney; Bruce Palmer; Nick St. Nicholas; Art Ayre; Goldy McJohn; John Kay

The Sparrows was a Canadian blues rock band of the 1960s. Notable for being the first group to bring musician John Kay into the mainstream, the Sparrows later morphed into the popular heavy rock group Steppenwolf.

== Early years ==
The original Jack London and the Sparrows line-up was formed in Oshawa, Ontario, in early 1964 by British émigré Dave Marden (also known as Jack London; born February 16, 1944, in London, England), guitarist Dennis Edmonton (born Dennis McCrohan, April 21, 1943, in Oshawa, Ontario), and keyboard player Dave Hare, who later played with Everyday People.

== British invasion ==
Jack London and the Sparrows began as a beat group and played heavily on Dave Marden's English background. Their early repertoire reflected the influence of the "British invasion" and London even went as far as coaxing the others to "fake" English accents, in order to convince the audience that they had just arrived from England. Shortly afterwards, Dennis' brother Jerry (born Jerry McCrohan, October 24, 1946, in Oshawa, Ontario) replaced the original drummer and Brent Maitland (stage name: Bert Enfield) joined on bass. The group began to build up a local following, playing at various venues, such as the local Jubilee Auditorium (which was owned by the Edmonton brothers' father).

After moving to Toronto later that year, C.J. Feeney joined on organ. A short while later, Bruce Palmer replaced Maitland, who went to university. This line-up signed to Capitol Records and scored a #3 hit on the RPM chart with debut single "If You Don't Want My Love". Palmer, however, soon tired of affecting an English accent and was traded for the Mynah Birds' member Nick St. Nicholas in January 1965. Around the same time, local jazz keyboardist Art Ayre (born March 18, 1942, in Toronto) replaced Feeney, who formed a new version of his former band, the Spellbinders.

The new line-up was responsible for the band's lone album and the subsequent singles. The single "I'll Be The Boy" reached #29 in Canada in March 1965. Only "Our Love Has Passed", however, neared the success of the debut single, reaching #7 on the RPM chart in May 1965.

By mid-1965, the group was beginning to progress beyond its early British influences and was starting to incorporate more of a North American blues-rock sound. At the same time, resentment was growing over London's role in the band; he had signed the recording deal so that he would collect most of the group's royalties. As a result, the band separated from London (who went solo) and recorded a final single as the Sparrows, "Hard Times With The Law", which hit #13 on the RPM chart in August.

== The Sparrows ==
During September 1965, the Sparrows added singer/songwriter, guitarist and harmonica player John Kay to the line-up. Art Ayre left at this point to pursue a career in jazz with the Art Ayre Trio (and later Moe Koffman) and was replaced by Goldy McJohn, formerly keyboard player for the Diplomats and for the Mynah Birds.

As the new look Sparrows, the group made its live debut at Waterloo Lutheran University (now Wilfrid Laurier University) in Waterloo, Ontario, during September 1965 and immediately made an impact with its high energy, blues rock sound. The following month, the band supported Gary Lewis & the Playboys at Massey Hall in Toronto and also found regular work at Chez Monique and the El Patio in the city's Yorkville village.

After his solo career dried up, London moved into production and then became president of the Canadian Association of Real Estate Investors.

== New York connections ==
Throughout the first few months of 1966, the group consolidated its following on the local club scene. Realizing that they needed to attract a wider audience, Sparrow (as the band was now called) attracted the interest of electronics executive Stanton J. Freeman, who became their manager and arranged for a booking at Arthur, Sybil Burton's hot new club in New York. Freeman then flew them to New York so the A&R people at the major record companies could see them perform. Sparrow were so well received that over the next five months, they commuted back and forth between Toronto and New York. While in the Big Apple, Sparrow also appeared at the Barge in Westhampton (the Rascals had played there the previous summer) on Long Island and at another New York club, the Downtown.

== Recording for Columbia Records ==
Producer David Kapralik, later manager of Sly & the Family Stone, was introduced to Freeman by Jerry Brandt (head of Rock & Roll at the William Morris Agency). Freeman brought Kapralik to see and hear the band. He also heard some demos that the group had recorded at Allegro Sound Studios in New York on April 28, 1966. Impressed by the quality of the songs, he assisted Freeman in getting a recording deal with Columbia Records. On June 25, the group recorded Dennis Edmonton's "Tomorrow's Ship," which was subsequently coupled with the Dennis Edmonton–Nick St. Nicholas collaboration, "Isn't It Strange," for the group's debut single.

The single failed to chart on its release. The band returned to Columbia's New York studios in October and recorded a follow-up, the Edmonton Brothers' "Green Bottle Lover," which was coupled with the Dennis Edmonton–Nick St. Nicholas collaboration, "Down Goes Your Love Life." Released the following month, the second single also failed to chart.

== Sparrow heads for California ==
By then, the band had abandoned Canada (and New York) for the warmer climes of California. During November 1966, Sparrow debuted at It's Boss in West Hollywood. Shortly thereafter, they moved to San Francisco where they performed at the Ark in nearby Sausalito as well as the Matrix and the Avalon Ballroom (sharing the stage with the Youngbloods and Moby Grape at the latter).

Sparrow continued to commute back and forth between Los Angeles and San Francisco throughout the first six months of 1967, performing alongside the Doors, the Steve Miller Band and many others. During June, Dennis Edmonton announced his decision to go solo and the band recruited American guitarist Michael Monarch in early July. Edmonton subsequently changed his name to Mars Bonfire.

== Steppenwolf ==
In 1967, St. Nicholas joined Los Angeles-based group the Hardtimes, who soon renamed themselves T.I.M.E., which stands for Trust in Men Everywhere. Capitol Records signed them to a $500,000 recording contract. After recording two albums with Mars Bonfire and bassist Rushton Moreve along with producer/arranger Gabriel Mekler, St. Nicholas' Sparrow bandmates John Kay, Jerry Edmonton and Goldy McJohn came to see him perform with T.I.M.E. at the Whisky a Go Go on the Sunset Strip and asked him to leave T.I.M.E. to rejoin them as Steppenwolf.

In 1969, in the wake of Steppenwolf's success, Columbia Records went into their archives and released the hitherto unheard 1967 live album of Sparrow at the Matrix, dubbed Early Steppenwolf. This LP release included unknown material as well as a different mix of "Isn't It Strange" (leaving the 45 rpm record single the only place to find the quite different original mix of the song).

== Band members ==
Official Sparrow members
1964 (as Jack London & the Sparrows)	Jack London – rhythm guitar, lead vocals; Dennis Edmonton – lead guitar, vocals; Bert Enfield – bass, vocals; Dave Hare – keyboards, vocals; Jerry Edmonton – drums
1964–1965 (as Jack London & the Sparrows)	Jack London – rhythm guitar, lead vocals; Dennis Edmonton – lead guitar, vocals; Bruce Palmer – bass, vocals; C.J. Feeney – keyboards, vocals; Jerry Edmonton – drums
1965 (as Jack London & the Sparrows)	Jack London – rhythm guitar, lead vocals; Dennis Edmonton – lead guitar, vocals; Nick St. Nicholas – bass, vocals; Art Ayre – keyboards, vocals; Jerry Edmonton – drums
1965–1966	John Kay – rhythm guitar, lead vocals; Dennis Edmonton – lead guitar, vocals; Nick St. Nicholas – bass, vocals; Art Ayre – keyboards, vocals; Jerry Edmonton – drums, lead vocals
1966–1967 (as Sparrow)	John Kay – rhythm guitar, lead vocals; Dennis Edmonton – lead guitar, vocals; Nick St. Nicholas – bass, vocals; Goldy McJohn – keyboards, vocals; Jerry Edmonton – drums, lead vocals

== Discography ==
=== As Jack London and the Sparrows ===
Albums

- Presenting Jack London and the Sparrows (1965), Capitol
- Jack London and the Sparrows (2003), EMI Int'l

Singles

- "If You Don't Want My Love" c/w "It's Been One of Those Days" Today (1964), Capitol – No. 3 CAN
- "I'll Be the Boy" c/w "Dream On Dreamer" (1965), Capitol
- "Our Love Has Passed" c/w "Sparrows and Daisies" (1965), Capitol – No. 7 CAN
- "Give My Love to Sally" c/w "Take It Slow" (1965), Capitol
- "Don't Ever Change" c/w "Misery & Me" (1965), RCA (Jack London as solo artist)

=== As The Sparrows / Sparrow ===
- John Kay & the Sparrow (1967 [1969]), Columbia
- The Best of John Kay & Sparrow: Tighten Up Your Wig (1993), Columbia
- John Kay & the Sparrow (2001), Repertoire (re-issue of the 1967 album plus bonus tracks)

As backing group on other artists' releases

- Molly Camp Sings ..... (1966), RCA Victor

=== Singles ===
- "Hard Times with the Law" c/w "Meet Me After Four" (1965), Capitol – No. 13 CAN
- "Tomorrow's Ship" b/w "Isn't It Strange" (1966), Columbia
- "Green Bottle Lover" b/w "Down Goes Your Love Life" (1966), Columbia
- "Square Headed People" b/w "Twisted" (1967), Columbia (as John Kay)
