= At Your Birthday Party =

Studio album by Steppenwolf
- Released: March 1969
- Recorded: October 1968 – February 1969
- Studios: American Recording, Studio City, California
- Genres: Psychedelic rock; blues rock; hard rock
- Length: 41:26
- Label: ABC Dunhill
- Producer: Gabriel Mekler

Steppenwolf chronology
The Second (1968)	At Your Birthday Party (1969)	Early Steppenwolf (1969)

Singles from At your Birthday Party
- 1. "Rock Me" Released: February 1969; 2. "It's Never Too Late" Released: April 1969

Professional ratings
Review scores
Source	Rating
AllMusic	3/5 stars

At Your Birthday Party is the third studio album by Canadian-American rock band Steppenwolf. The album was released in March 1969, by ABC Dunhill Records.

== Background ==
It was the first Steppenwolf album to feature bass player Nick St. Nicholas; and the last album to feature guitarist Michael Monarch, who left the band in August 1969. Although it was less critically acclaimed than their successful first two albums, Steppenwolf and The Second, it contains a few well-known hits, such as "It's Never Too Late" and "Jupiter's Child", as well as "Rock Me," which had been featured in the 1968 film Candy. Although the band would be very successful in the early 1970s, At Your Birthday Party would be their last top ten album and features their last top ten single. The album showcases Steppenwolf coming out of, but not yet completely abandoning, the psychedelia of The Second and stepping into the distinctive hard rock of their later releases.

== Cover art ==
The album's cover was designed by art director Gary Burden. The original LP was a gatefold with a punched-out front cover; the punchout revealed a photo of the band which comprised the inner sleeve's recto. This photo of the band was shot by Henry Diltz, and it shows the band sitting in the remnants of amplifiers and equipment in a charred house which had belonged to Canned Heat. (A 1969 fire ripped through Canned Heat's house and rehearsal studio on Lookout Mountain Ave in Laurel Canyon, Los Angeles, California.) Original lead guitarist Michael Monarch did not show up for the photo shoot. Steppenwolf producer Gabriel Mekler bore a physical resemblance to Monarch, and it was decided that Mekler would take Monarch's place in the photo. Mekler was able to hide himself all the more in the photo by sporting a pair of sunglasses. Initially, not too many noticed. Monarch was still in the band, however. (A dispelled myth is that Monarch was no longer in the band at the time of the photo shoot; he was in the band until the latter part of 1969, and the album came out in early 1969.) The LP was reissued on CD by MCA in late 1980s. MCA decided to not use the photo for their CD re-issue and opted only for the original unfinished war mouse painting, originally intended as the LP's cover. The resulting CD artwork indeed looks bare as a result. The surrounding black-and-white image of the LP's gate-fold sleeve was made by importing images of cartoon mouse heads onto the bodies of soldiers within an image of a U.S. Civil War trenched battlefield. The black-and-white portion of the album art was a collage made by Gary Burden, who planned to enlist Rick Griffin to paint a final version of the album art, but Dunhill Records declined to pay for the painting and so used Burden's black-and-white prototype.

== Track listing ==
Side one
No.	Title	Writer(s)	Length
1.	"Don't Cry"	Gabriel Mekler	3:11
2.	"Chicken Wolf"	John Kay, Michael Monarch	2:58
3.	"Lovely Meter"	Mekler	3:10
4.	"Round and Down"	Monarch	3:19
5.	"It's Never Too Late"	Kay, Nick St. Nicholas	4:07
6.	"Sleeping Dreaming"	St. Nicholas	1:07

Side two
No.	Title	Writer(s)	Length
7.	"Jupiter's Child"	Jerry Edmonton, Kay, Monarch	3:28
8.	"She'll Be Better"	Edmonton, Mekler	5:32
9.	"Cat Killer"	John Goadsby	1:37
10.	"Rock Me"	Kay	3:45
11.	"God Fearing Man"	Monarch	3:55
12.	"Mango Juice"	Edmonton, Goadsby, Monarch	3:01
13.	"Happy Birthday"	Mekler	2:16

== Personnel ==
=== Steppenwolf ===
- John Kay – lead vocals, rhythm guitar, harmonica
- Michael Monarch – lead guitar
- Goldy McJohn – organ, piano
- Nick St. Nicholas – bass, backing vocals and lead vocals on “Sleeping Dreaming”
- Jerry Edmonton – drums, backing vocals and lead vocals on “Lovely Meter”, and “She'll Be Better”

=== Technical ===
- Gabriel Mekler – producer
- Bill Cooper – engineer
- Richard Podolor – engineer
- Gary Burden – cover design
- Henry Diltz – photography

== Charts ==
Album - Billboard (United States)

Year	Chart	Position
1969	Billboard 200	7

Singles - Billboard (United States)

Year	Single	Chart	Position
1969	"Rock Me"	Billboard Hot 100	10
1969	"It's Never Too Late"	Billboard Hot 100	51
