= Rusher Itamae =

Japanese comedian (born 1963)

- ラッシャー板前
- Born: Hiroshi Suzuki; June 15, 1963 (age 62); Matsudo, Chiba Prefecture, Japan
- Education: Municipal Matsudo High School
- Occupation: Comedian
- Years active: 2011–present
- Agent: Office Kitano
- Known for: Super J Channel; Asada! Namadesu Tabi Salad; Chii Sanpo
- Height: 1.68 m (5 ft 6 in)
- Website: www.office-kitano.co.jp/contents/OFFICE/kidoairaku/index.html

Rusher Itamae (ラッシャー板前, Rasshā Itamae; born 15 June 1963) is a Japanese comedian who is a member of the Takeshi Gundan. His real name is Hiroshi Suzuki (鈴木 浩, Suzuki Hiroshi).

Rusher Itamae is represented with Office Kitano. He graduated from Matsudo Municipal Kawarazuka Elementary School, Matsudo Municipal Tokiwadaira Junior High School, and Municipal Matsudo High School. Rusher Itamae's older brother was Uganda Tora whom he married his sister.

When he appears in Ore-tachi Hyōkinzoku and advertisements with Takeshi Kitano, he appeared as Itabashi-ku no Suzuki-san (板橋区の鈴木さん).

== Filmography ==
=== TV series ===
Year	Title	Network	Notes
	Super J Channel	TV Asahi	Tuesday appearances, appeared in "Russher Itamae no Benri-ya taishō!"
	Asada! Namadesu Tabi Salad	TV Asahi	Charge in relays
2012	Waka Taishō no yūyū Sanpo	TV Asahi	
	Tokusen ī mono sagashi	TV Asahi	
	Shizuoka-hatsu Sokoshiri	SBS	

Former appearances

Year	Title	Role	Network	Notes
	Kokoro wa Lonley Kimochi wa "..." IV		Fuji TV	
1995	Super Mario Stadium		TV Tokyo	Quasi-regular appearances
2005	Kaiteki! Zubari		TV Asahi	MC
2008	Chii Sanpo		TV Asahi	
	DokiDoki terebi		HAB	
2015	Zeni no Sensō	Masayuki Tsuchida	KTV	Episode 1
2015	Okutama Chūzai Deka	Taxi driver	TV Tokyo	
2016	Sai Sōsa Keiji Yūsuke Kataoka	Ishizuka	TV Asahi	

=== Radio ===
Title	Network
Sanma Akashiya no Radio ga	NBS
Takeo Takimoto no Rakuchin Dai Kakumei	ABC Radio

== Advertisements ==
Year	Title	Notes
1984	Sunstar De Mute Sunstar	Co-starred with Takeshi Kitano and Rakkyo Ide
1985	Bandai Party Joy series	
