= Monster (Steppenwolf album) =

Studio album by Steppenwolf
- Released: November 1969
- Recorded: 1969
- Studios: American Recording, Studio City, California
- Genres: Psychedelic rock; blues rock; hard rock
- Length: 32:53
- Label: ABC Dunhill
- Producer: Gabriel Mekler

Steppenwolf chronology
Early Steppenwolf (1969)	Monster (1969)	Steppenwolf Live (1970)

Singles from Monster
- 1. "Move Over" Released: August 1969; 2. "Monster" Released: December 1969

Professional ratings
Review scores
Source	Rating
AllMusic	2/5 stars
The Daily Vault	B+
Rolling Stone	(unfavorable)
The Village Voice	B+

Monster is the fourth studio album by Canadian-American rock band Steppenwolf. The album was released in November 1969, by ABC Dunhill Records. It was their first LP with new lead guitarist Larry Byrom instead of Michael Monarch. The album was Steppenwolf's most political album, making references to prominent issues at the time, such as the Vietnam War.

The album was the first Steppenwolf album not to feature a US top ten hit, though two singles from the album entered the top 40: "Move Over" and "Monster".

== Reception ==
Reviews for Monster have generally been negative. Rolling Stone commented that the playing of the individual performers is "top-notch", but that "[t]heir arrangements have become sloppy and crude, as the early-Zappa lyrics continuously clash with the music."

AllMusic panned the album in their retrospective review, remarking that "these lumbering hard rock tunes were not an effective means to address [important political topics], politically or musically."

On the other hand, Village Voice critic Robert Christgau gave the album praise. Christgau gave the album a B+ rating and called it "an excellent comeback", though he thought the preachy lyrics marred somewhat the final result.

Record World called the title track a "rocking smash" on which "the group never sounded better." Record World said of the single "Move Over" that "Steppenwolf are back in their best of bags."

== Track listing ==
Side one
No.	Title	Writer(s)	Length
1.	"Monster/Suicide/America"	John Kay, Jerry Edmonton / Kay, Nick St. Nicholas, Larry Byrom, Edmonton / Kay, Edmonton	9:15
2.	"Draft Resister"	Kay, Goldy McJohn, Byrom	3:20
3.	"Power Play"	Kay	5:26

Side two
No.	Title	Writer(s)	Length
4.	"Move Over"	Kay, Gabriel Mekler	2:53
5.	"Fag" (instrumental)	Byrom, Edmonton, St. Nicholas	3:13
6.	"What Would You Do (If I Did That to You)"	Leno Francen, Nolan Porter	3:19
7.	"From Here to There Eventually"	Kay, McJohn, Edmonton	5:27

== Personnel ==
=== Steppenwolf ===
- John Kay – vocals, harmonica, guitar
- Larry Byrom – lead guitar
- Nick St. Nicholas – bass guitar
- Goldy McJohn – Hammond organ, piano
- Jerry Edmonton – drums and lead vocals on "What Would You Do (If I Did That to You)"

=== Technical ===
- Gabriel Mekler – producer
- Bill Cooper – engineer
- Richard Podolor – engineer

== Charts ==
=== Album ===
Chart performance for Monster
Chart (1970)	Peak position
German Albums (Offizielle Top 100)	27
Norwegian Albums (VG-lista)	9
UK Albums (Official Charts)	43
US Billboard 200	17

=== Singles ===
Chart performance for singles from Monster
Year	Single	Chart	Position
1969	"Move Over"	US Billboard Hot 100	31
1969	"Monster"	US Billboard Hot 100	39
