= John Kay (musician) =

American rock musician (born 1944)

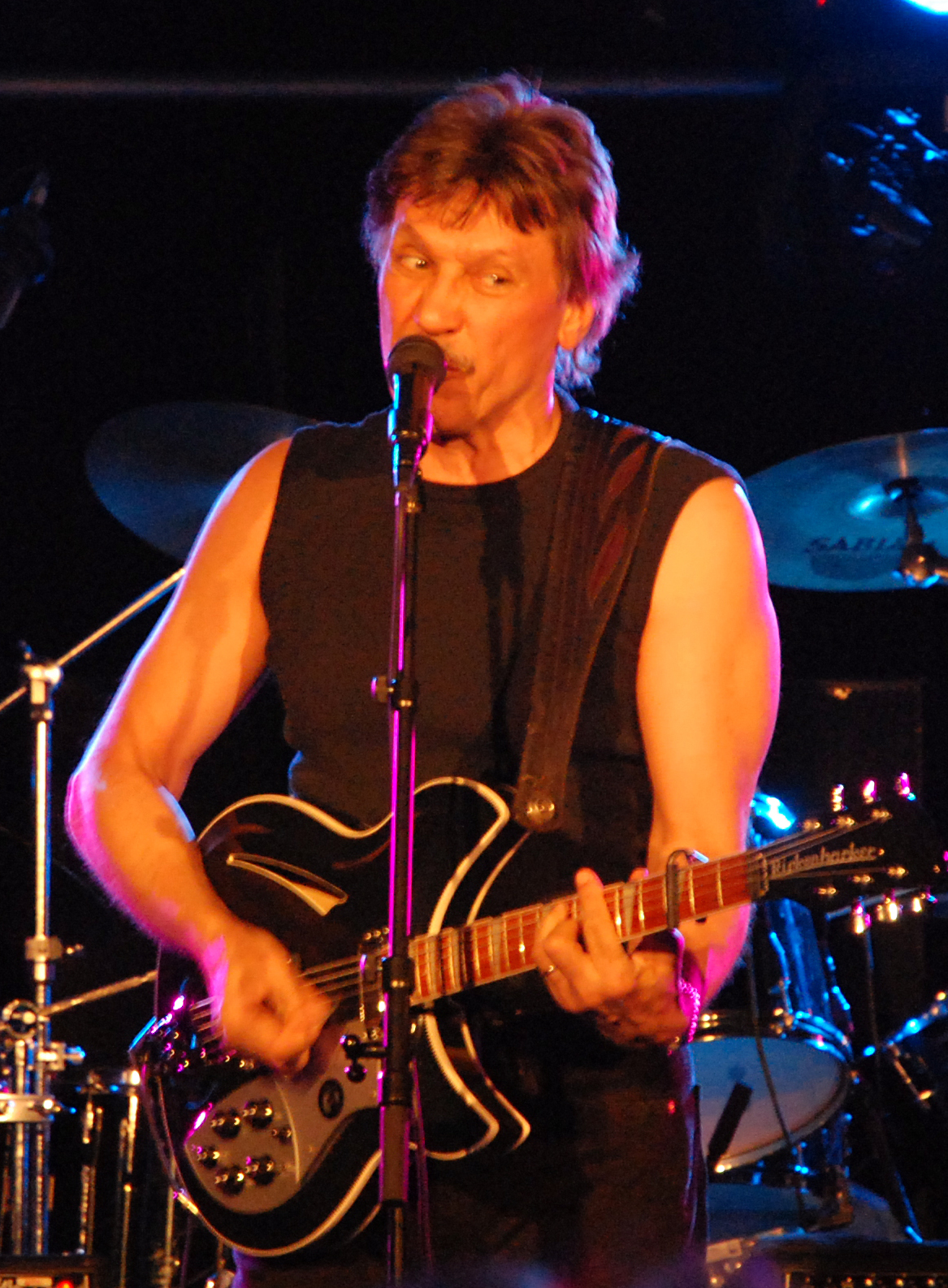
- Kay performing at Lillehammer Rock Weekend in Norway, 2007

Background information
- Born: Joachim Fritz Krauledat; April 12, 1944 (age 82); Tilsit, East Prussia, Nazi Germany
- Genres: Rock; psychedelia; blues; folk
- Occupations: Singer; musician; songwriter
- Instruments: Vocals; guitar; harmonica
- Years active: 1964–present
- Member of: The John Kay Band
- Formerly of: The Sparrows; Steppenwolf
- Website: steppenwolf.com

John Kay (born Joachim Fritz Krauledat; April 12, 1944) is an American rock singer, songwriter and guitarist known as the frontman of Steppenwolf.

== Early life ==
Kay was born on April 12, 1944, in Tilsit, East Prussia, Nazi Germany (now Sovetsk, Kaliningrad Oblast, Russia). His father Fritz, born 1913 in Absteinen near Pogegen in the Memelland (today Opstainys in Pagėgiai Municipality, Lithuania), was killed a month before Kay was born.

In early 1945, Kay's mother fled with him from the advancing Soviet troops during the evacuation of East Prussia in harsh winter conditions. Their train got stuck near Arnstadt, which was first occupied by the Americans, but then became part of the East German Soviet occupation zone.

In 1949, they crossed the already-fortified border to resettle in Hanover, West Germany (as recounted in his song "Renegade" on the album Steppenwolf 7). Now living in the British occupation zone, the young Joachim, who had eye problems and could not speak or understand English, was first inspired by and learned about rock 'n' roll music while listening to Little Richard on U.S. Armed Forces radio.

When his family moved to Toronto in 1958, teachers had a hard time pronouncing his birth name, so he was called John K instead. Five years later, they moved to Buffalo, New York, and became American citizens. (Note: Although Kay is sometimes described as Canadian, he has never held Canadian citizenship. Author Ryan Edwardson wrote: "Kay immigrated to Canada from Europe in March 1958 at the age of fourteen and did not take up citizenship before moving to the United States five years later, at which point his family became American citizens.")

Kay stated in an interview that "The first letter I got when I arrived in Buffalo, New York, was from the draft board." However he was ruled 4-F (medically ineligible) due to having achromatopsia, a congenital condition that made him sensitive to light and legally blind.

== Career ==
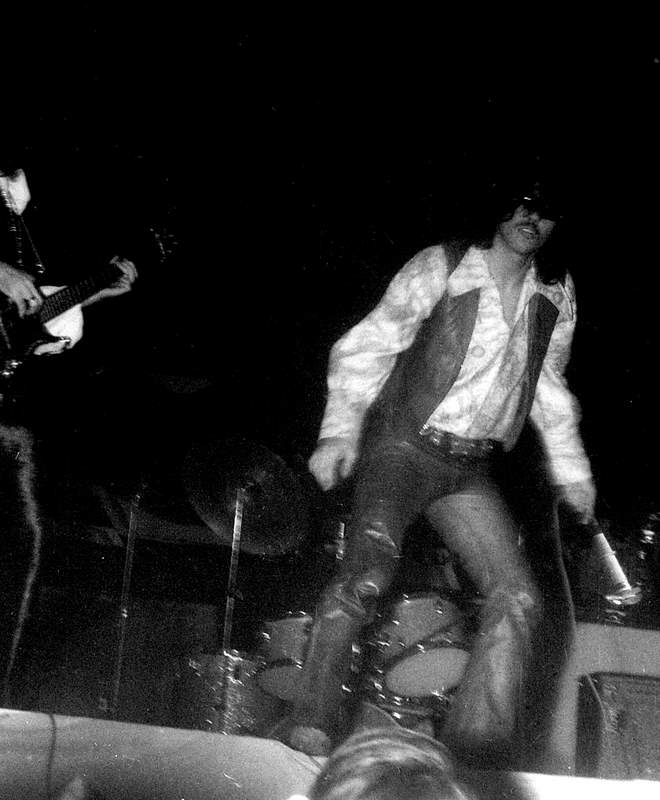
Kay in a performance in South Carolina, United States, on 1 January 1971

In the early 1960s, Kay worked at the Troubadour club in Los Angeles without success. After hitchhiking to Canada in 1965, he was invited by fellow German-born bass player Nick St. Nicholas to join the blues-rock band the Sparrows. The band had moderate success in Canada before moving to California, augmenting its line-up, and changing its name to Steppenwolf in 1967. With music that pioneered hard rock and heavy metal, Kay's Steppenwolf had international success with songs such as "Born to Be Wild", "Magic Carpet Ride", "Monster", "The Pusher", and "Rock Me".

Kay recorded both as a solo artist and with Steppenwolf during the late 1970s, and wrapped up Steppenwolf's 50th year of touring with what was to be a final gig in October 2018. Kay and Steppenwolf appeared on 24 July 2010 at the three-day HullabaLOU music festival in Louisville, Kentucky.

== Awards and recognition ==
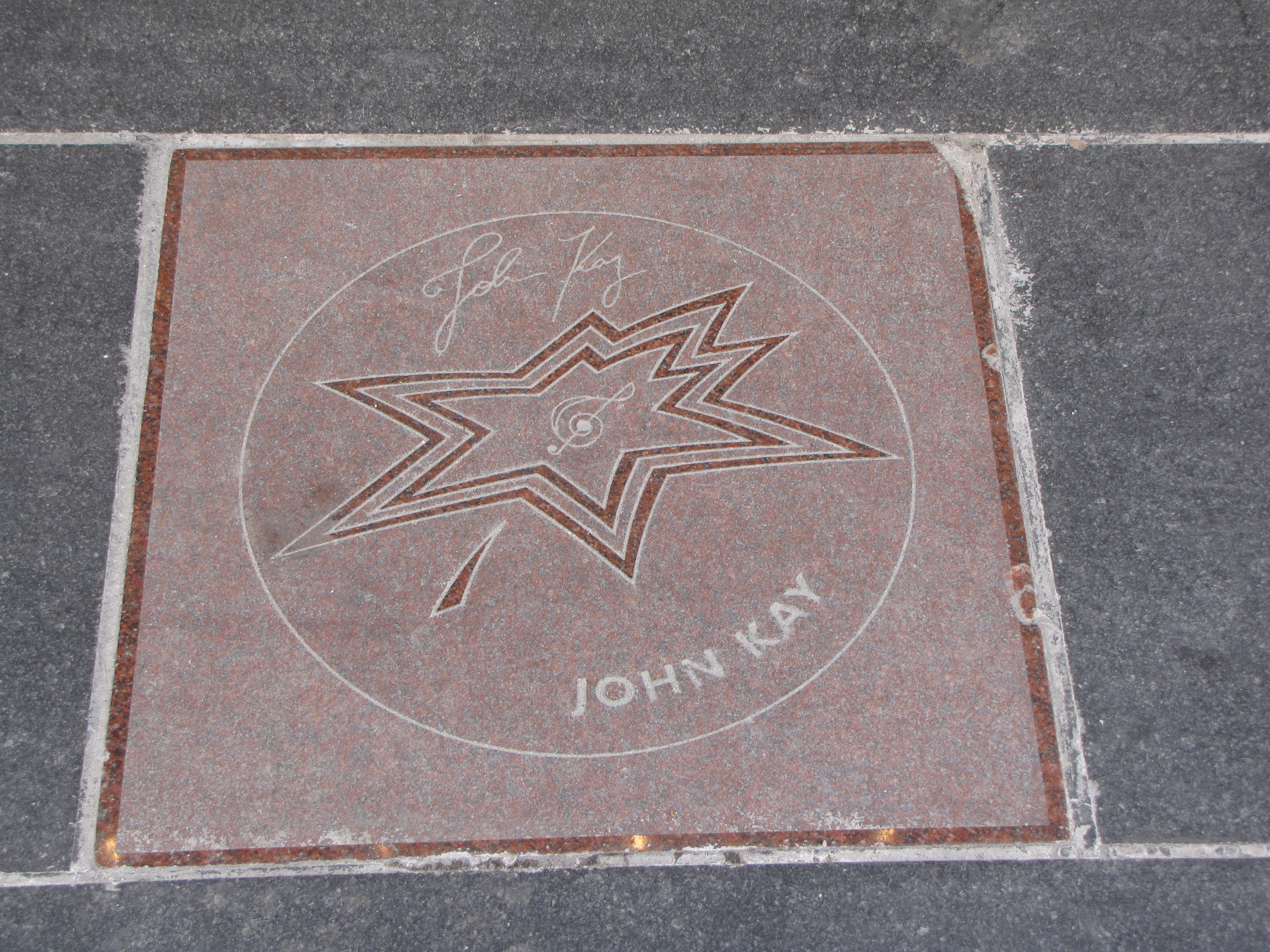
Kay's star on Canada's Walk of Fame

Despite never holding Canadian citizenship, Kay was inducted into Canada's Walk of Fame in recognition of the beginning of his musical career in Toronto. He was also nominated as part of Steppenwolf for induction into the Rock and Roll Hall of Fame in 2016 for the induction year 2017. In 2018, Steppenwolf's "Born to Be Wild" was one of the first five record singles to be inducted into The Rock n Roll Hall of Fame.

== Personal life ==
Kay is married to German-born Jutta Maue, whom he met in 1965 in Canada while she was working in a coffeehouse where Kay's band, the Sparrows, were playing. They have one daughter, Shawn. The couple founded the Maue-Kay Foundation, which supports human rights and the protection of wildlife and the environment.

In 2016, Kay credited his relationship with Jutta as part of the inspiration for Steppenwolf's "Magic Carpet Ride".

As of 2005, Kay has residences in West Vancouver, British Columbia, and Nashville, Tennessee.

== Discography ==
=== Steppenwolf ===
Year	Album	Chart positions	
Year	Album	CAN	US
1968	Steppenwolf	1	6
1968	The Second	2	3
1969	At Your Birthday Party	12	7
1969	Monster	11	17
1970	Steppenwolf 7	14	19
1970	Live	—	7
1971	For Ladies Only	—	54
1974	Slow Flux	—	47
1975	Hour of the Wolf	—	155
1976	Skullduggery	—	—
1980	Live In London (John Kay and Steppenwolf album)	—	—
1982	Wolftracks (John Kay and Steppenwolf album)	—	—
1984	Paradox (John Kay and Steppenwolf album)	—	—
1987	Rock & Roll Rebels (John Kay and Steppenwolf album)	—	171
1990	Rise & Shine (John Kay and Steppenwolf album)	—	—
1996	Feed the Fire (John Kay and Steppenwolf album)	—	—
2004	Live in Louisville (John Kay and Steppenwolf album)	—	—

=== Solo ===
Year	Album	Chart positions		
Year	Album	CAN	AUS	US
1972	Forgotten Songs and Unsung Heroes	50	48	113
1973	My Sportin' Life	—	—	200
1978	All in Good Time	—	—	—
1987	Lone Steppenwolf (compilation)	—	—	—
1997	The Lost Heritage Tapes	—	—	—
2001	Heretics and Privateers	—	—	—

=== Solo singles ===
Year	Single	Chart positions				Album
Year	Single	CAN	CAN AC	CAN Country	US	Album
1972	"I'm Movin' On"	45	—	—	52	Forgotten Songs and Unsung Heroes
1973	"Moonshine (Friend of Mine)"	26	19	44	105	My Sportin' Life
1973	"Easy Evil"	82	—	—	102	My Sportin' Life
