= Audiovisual Communicators =

Philippine radio network

Audiovisual Communicators, Inc. (ACI)
- Type: Private
- Industry: Broadcast FM radio network
- Founded: 1975
- Headquarters: 17th Floor, Strata 2000 Bldg., F. Ortigas Jr. Rd., Ortigas Center, Pasig, Philippines
- Key people: Rafael Barreiro (President)
- Website: www.monster.fm

Audiovisual Communicators, Inc. is a Philippine radio network. ACI operates stations across major cities in the Philippines, mostly under the Monster Radio branding.

== ACI stations ==
Branding	Callsign	Frequency	Location
Monster Manila	DWRX	93.1 MHz	Metro Manila
Monster Cebu	DYBT	105.9 MHz	Cebu City
Monster Davao	DXBT	99.5 MHz	Davao City
Radyo Sincero Zamboanga	DXRX	93.1 MHz	Zamboanga City

=== Former ===
Callsign	Frequency	Location
DXEZ	88.7 MHz	General Santos
