= DWRX =

Radio station in Metro Manila, Philippines

Monster RX 93.1 (DWRX)
- Pasig; Philippines
- Broadcast area: Mega Manila and surrounding areas
- Frequency: 93.1 MHz
- RDS: Monster RX93.1
- Branding: Monster RX 93.1

Programming
- Language: English
- Format: Top 40 (CHR), OPM
- Network: Monster Radio

Ownership
- Owner: Audiovisual Communicators, Inc.

History
- First air date: 1973
- Former call signs: DWEI (1973–1983)
- Former names: WEI FM (1973–August 1983); Music City (August 1983–1987); Light Rock (1987–October 1990)
- Call sign meaning: Rx (prescription symbol); Rated Excellent

Technical information
- Licensing authority: NTC
- Class: A, B, C
- Power: 25,000 watts
- ERP: 40,000 watts

Links
- Webcast: Listen Live
- Website: www.rx931.com

DWRX (93.1 FM), broadcasting as Monster RX 93.1, is a radio station owned and operated by Audiovisual Communicators, Inc. It serves as the flagship station of Monster Radio. The station's studio and transmitter are located at the 17th floor, Strata 2000 Bldg., F. Ortigas, Jr. Rd. (formerly Emerald Ave.), Ortigas Center, Pasig.

As of Q4 2022, Monster RX 93.1 is the 11th most-listened to FM radio station (and #1 among Top 40/CHR stations) in Metro Manila, based on a survey commissioned by Kantar Media Philippines and Kapisanan ng mga Brodkaster ng Pilipinas.

== History ==
The station was launched in 1973 under the call letters DWEI, originally owned by Liberty Broadcasting Corporation. It featured MOR programming. In 1983, the station was sold to Audiovisual Communicators, which was then led by Rene Lacson and Freddie Garcia, and changed its call letters to DWRX, RX referring to "prescription music". On August 23, 1983, the station was relaunched as Music City RX93 with an oldies format and became #1 in radio surveys in the mid-1980s.

In 1987, the station transferred from its studio and offices in Makati to its current location in Ortigas and switched to an easy listening format under the brand Light Rock RX93.

In October 1990, the station switched to a Top 40 format and rebranded as Monster Radio RX93. Three years later, it carried the slogan "The First Creative Pop Station" and added ".1" to its call number. In the late 1990s, it adopted its current slogan, "Manila's Hottest". The station is also known as "Summer's Hottest" & "Season's Hottest".

RX 93.1 is home of the long-running morning show The Morning Rush.

== Notable DJs ==
- Kayla Rivera
- Karen Bordador
- Rico Robles
- Markki Stroem

=== Former ===
- Jun Banaag

== Monster scholarship program ==
This project began in September 2009. It started as a small effort by Monster Radio RX93.1's Vice-President for Operations & Programming, Raffy Barreiro, to help college students in dire need of assistance. The scholarship provides assistance for one semester and does not require a student to maintain a certain average.

== Recognitions ==
The station has been named Best FM Radio Station a record 11 times by the Kapisanan ng mga Brodkaster ng Pilipinas, most recently in the 25th KBP Golden Dove Awards in 2017.

In addition, several RX programs and specials, as well as on-air radio personalities, have been recognized by the KBP, the Catholic Mass Media Awards (CMMA), and other award-giving organizations.
