= DXBT =

Radio station in Davao City, Philippines

Monster Radio Davao (DXBT)
- Davao City; Philippines
- Broadcast area: Metro Davao and surrounding areas
- Frequency: 99.5 MHz
- Branding: Monster BT 99.5

Programming
- Language: English
- Format: CHR/Top 40, OPM
- Network: Monster Radio

Ownership
- Owner: Audiovisual Communicators, Inc.

History
- First air date: 1995
- Former call signs: DXOZ (1995–2002); DXCT (2002–2009)
- Former names: OZ 99.5 (1995–2002)

Technical information
- Licensing authority: NTC
- Power: 10,000 watts
- ERP: 35,000 watts

Links
- Webcast: Listen Live
- Website: www.monsterdavao.com

DXBT (99.5 FM), broadcasting as Monster BT 99.5, is a radio station owned and operated by Audiovisual Communicators, Inc. Its studio and transmitter are located at The Peak, Gaisano Mall of Davao, J.P. Laurel Ave., Bajada, Davao City.

The station was formerly known as OZ 99.5 under Amapola Broadcasting from its inception in 1995 to 2002, when Audiovisual Communicators acquired the station and became part of the Monster Radio network.
