= Kapisanan ng mga Brodkaster ng Pilipinas =

Philippine media organization

Kapisanan ng mga Broadkaster ng Pilipinas
- Abbreviation: KBP
- Formation: April 27, 1973; 53 years ago
- Type: Non-governmental, Nonprofit
- Headquarters: Makati, Philippines
- Location: Philippines
- Chairman: Herman Z. Basbaño
- President: Noel C. Galvez
- Affiliations: Asia-Pacific Broadcasting Union
- Website: https://kbp.org.ph/

The Kapisanan ng mga Brodkaster ng Pilipinas (KBP; English: Broadcasters' Guild of the Philippines) is a broadcast media organization in the Philippines which provides its members broadcasting standards. The KBP was organized on April 27, 1973 in order to promote professional and ethical standards in Philippine broadcasting both in radio and television.

The KBP provides broadcast media regulations and guidelines for news, public affairs and commentaries, political broadcasts, children's shows, religious programming, and including advertising to its members. The members of the KBP are composed of the owners and operators of radio and television stations including the radio and television stations themselves.

== Broadcast code of the Philippines ==
The KBP's Broadcast Code is a set of standards for performance and ethics to be followed by member radio and television stations. The Code is in 3 parts: Part 1 includes the 33 articles of which the standards for programming are illustrated. Part 2 pertains to the implementing rules and regulations of the KBP, while Part 3 outlines the penalties for violations.

The 33 articles of Part 1 cover all broadcast media (radio and television) that are members of KBP. These mainly cover how programs such as news and public affairs programs remain just, fair and unbiased in their views and opinions. The Code also states that news sources must be clearly identified, except when the sources meet a confidentiality condition. The Code provides correctional measures should a broadcast entity release non-factual information. The standards in the Code pertain to all types of programming and how these should be monitored when showing content that is sexual or violent. The KBP advocates the 18-minute advertising per hour (i.e., 30% of broadcast time) rule for Philippine TV stations, the 18-minute rule was strictly implemented to prevent ads cluttering the TV programs.

== The KBP Golden Dove Awards ==
The Golden Dove Award

Since 1990 the KBP has held the Golden Dove Awards, an annual awards recognition event which pays tribute to broadcast practitioners for their contributions and achievements in the broadcast industry. The judges for each of the categories are from selected media practitioners, advertisers and the academic community. As of the 17th Golden Dove Awards they have been giving away awards for the following categories:

- Broadcaster of the Year
- Lifetime Achievement Award
- Best AM and FM Station
- Best Comedy Program & Host
- Best Drama Program & Host
- Best Drama Series
- Best Field Reporter
- Best Game Show & Host
- Best Magazine Program & Host
- Best Magazine Talk Show & Host
- Best Newscast Program & Host
- Best Newscaster for Television & Radio
- Best Public Affairs Program & Host
- Best Public Announcement
- Best Public Service Program Radio and TV Host
- Best Radio Jock
- Best Science and Technology Program & Host
- Best TV Station
- Best Variety Show Program for both Manila and other provinces

== Member stations ==
As of 2020, the Philippines has a total of 297 television broadcast stations, up from 173 in 1998. There are also 659 FM stations and 383 AM stations; this comprises regional subsidiaries and smaller entities in provinces and was based on the total number of National Telecommunications Commission (NTC) licenses distributed. Cable television (CATV) remains outside of the KBP's broadcast code, but the programs are still reviewed by the Movie and Television Review and Classification Board of the Philippines (MTRCB).

=== Broadcast stations by region ===
Region	AM stations	FM stations	TV stations	Total
National Capital Region (NCR)	30	25	21	76
Cordillera Administrative Region (CAR)	11	29	17	56
Region I – Ilocos Region	37	50	53	140
Region II – Cagayan Valley	17	39	46	102
Region III – Central Luzon*	18	34	45	107
Region IV – Southern Tagalog	31	97	59	187
Region V – Bicol	36	92	30	134
Region VI – Western Visayas	35	71	29	135
Region VII – Central Visayas	27	47	21	95
Region VIII – Eastern Visayas	22	30	11	63
Region IX – Western Mindanao	23	44	21	88
Region X – Northern Mindanao	22	37	21	80
Region XI – Southern Mindanao	34	77	31	142
Region XII – Central Mindanao	14	23	9	46
Region XIII – Caraga	9	7	5	21
Bangsamoro	18	34	15	67

- Note: radio and television stations in Central Luzon are also members of the Central Luzon Media Association (CLMA).

== See also ==
- Radio in the Philippines
- Department of Information and Communications Technology (DICT)
- Movie and Television Review and Classification Board (MTRCB)
- National Telecommunications Commission (NTC)
- 26th KBP Golden Dove Awards
