= Flow State (Keith Urban album) =

Studio album by Keith Urban
- Released: 12 June 2026
- Studio: The Sound (Nashville)
- Genres: Country; soft rock; yacht rock
- Length: 45:23
- Labels: Hit Red; MCA Nashville
- Producers: Dann Huff; Keith Urban

Keith Urban chronology
High (2024)	Flow State (2026)

Flow State (stylised in all lowercase) is the thirteenth studio album by Australian and American country music singer Keith Urban. The album was released on 12 June 2026 via Hit Red and MCA Nashville. The album comprises mostly covers, with the exception of one original song, "We Go Back", featuring Michael McDonald.

At the 2026 ARIA Music Awards it was nominated for Best Country Album.

== Background ==
Flow State features ten covers of classic soft rock songs and one original song, "We Go Back", which features Michael McDonald. Aside from McDonald, the album also features collaborations with Little Big Town and John Mayer.

Urban first mentioned making a yacht rock album during the Country Radio Seminar in Nashville, Tennessee, when he stated, "It's the first time I've done an album of covers. There is one original on the record. It's a thematic record...yacht rock songs. You think I'm kidding? I'm not kidding." He described his inspiration for the album as coming from the original intent of yacht rock as a genre: "music created as an antidote to stress, built to uplift."

The album was officially announced on 29 April 2026, alongside the release of the lone original, "We Go Back" featuring Michael McDonald, and Urban's version of "Summer Breeze".

Flow State was recorded at Urban's studio, The Sound (formerly The Tracking Room), in Nashville, where the project began with just recording one or two songs for fun without the intention of releasing them, before evolving into an album full of material.

== Track listing ==
Credits are adapted from the album's liner notes.

Flow State track listing
No.	Title	Writer(s)	Original artist(s)	Length
1.	"Steal Away"	Rick Chudacoff; Robert Dupuis	Robbie Dupree	4:11
2.	"Baby Come Back"	John Charles Crowley; Peter Beckett	Player	4:21
3.	"Magnet and Steel" (featuring Little Big Town)	Walter Lindsay Egan	Walter Egan	4:31
4.	"Just the Two of Us"	Bill Withers; Ralph MacDonald; William Salter	Grover Washington Jr. featuring Bill Withers	3:51
5.	"On and On"	Stephen Bishop	Stephen Bishop	3:13
6.	"We Go Back" (featuring Michael McDonald)	Keith Urban; Breland; Sam Sumser; Sean Small		3:30
7.	"Help Is on Its Way"	Glenn Shorrock	Little River Band	3:58
8.	"How Much I Feel"	David Robert Pack	Ambrosia	4:56
9.	"Summer Breeze"	David Crofts; James Seals	Seals & Crofts	4:00
10.	"I Just Wanna Stop"	Ross Vannelli	Gino Vannelli	3:43
11.	"Guitar Man" (featuring John Mayer)	David Gates	Bread	5:09
Total length:				45:23

== Personnel ==
Credits are adapted from the album's liner notes.

=== Musicians ===
- Keith Urban – lead vocals (all tracks); electric guitar (all tracks); background vocals (tracks 1, 2, 4–9, 11), acoustic guitar (6, 7, 9, 11)
- Chris McHugh – drums (all tracks), percussion (1, 4, 7, 10)
- Charlie Judge – keyboards (1–5, 7–11), string synthesizer (8), synthesizer (9)
- Mark Hill – bass (1–5, 7–11)
- Josh Reedy – background vocals (1, 2, 7, 8)
- Kris Donegan – acoustic guitar (1, 5), electric guitar (3, 5, 7)
- Rob McNelley – electric guitar (2)
- Wendy Moten – background vocals (3, 4, 10)
- Justin Schipper – pedal steel (3, 5)
- Karen Fairchild – background vocals (3)
- Kimberly Schlapman – background vocals (3)
- Jimi Westbrook – background vocals (3)
- Philip Sweet – background vocals (3)
- Tom Bukovac – electric guitar (4, 8, 10), acoustic guitar (9)
- Vicky Hampton – background vocals (4, 10)
- Tania Hancheroff – background vocals (4, 10)
- Mark Douthit – saxophone (4)
- Eric Darken – percussion (5, 9)
- David Huff – programming (6), percussion (8, 11)
- Breland – background vocals (6)
- Tommy Sims – bass (6)
- Sam Sumser – electric guitar (6)
- Pete Kuzma – keyboards (6)
- Michael McDonald – vocals (6)
- Mark Dobson – percussion (8)
- Dann Huff – electric guitar (9)
- John Mayer – electric guitar, background vocals (11)

=== Technical and creative ===
- Keith Urban – production
- Dann Huff – production
- Justin Niebank – recording (1, 3, 5)
- Mark Dobson – recording (2, 4, 10), additional recording (1, 3, 5–9, 11)
- Vance Powell – recording (6)
- Steve Marcantonio – recording (7)
- Drew Bollman – recording (8, 9)
- Dom Camardella – Michael McDonald vocal recording (6)
- Evan Ridgway – recording assistance (1–5, 7–11), additional recording assistance (1, 3, 5–9, 11)
- Joey Stanca – recording assistance (1, 3, 5)
- Austin Brown – recording assistance (2, 4, 10)
- Keller Lindley – recording assistance (6), additional recording assistance (1, 3, 5–9, 11)
- Terry Koehn – recording assistance (6)
- Steve Cordray – recording assistance (7–9, 11)
- Scott Johnson – production management
- Jack Emblem – mixing
- Dan Weston – mixing assistance
- Pete Lyman – mastering
- Brendan Walter – art direction, design
- Georgia Malone – layout, design
- Phil Chester – photography
- Sara Byrne – photography
- Peter Lamden – hair
- Barbara Guillaume – make-up
- Wendy Schecter – wardrobe styling

== Charts ==
Chart performance for Flow State
Chart (2026)	Peak position
Australian Albums (ARIA)	5
Australian Country Albums (ARIA)	1
Scottish Albums (Official Charts)	38
Swiss Albums (Schweizer Hitparade)	89
UK Albums Sales (OCC)	38
US Billboard 200	57
US Top Country Albums (Billboard)	12

== Release history ==
Release dates and formats for Flow State
Region	Date	Format(s)	Label(s)	Ref.
Various	12 June 2026	Digital download, CD	MCA Nashville	
United States	10 July 2026	Vinyl	MCA Nashville	
