= List of yacht rock artists =

The following is a list of bands and artists which have been described as belonging to yacht rock.

== Yacht rock ==
- 10cc
- Ace
- Bryan Adams
- Air Supply
- Airplay
- Herb Alpert
- Ambrosia
- America
- Patti Austin
- Average White Band
- Marty Balin
- George Benson
- Stephen Bishop
- Blondie
- Bread
- Jackson Browne
- Jimmy Buffett
- Bobby Caldwell
- Captain & Tennille
- Eric Carmen
- The Carpenters
- Chicago
- The Chieftains
- Climax Blues Band
- Phil Collins
- The Commodores
- Rita Coolidge
- Crosby, Stills and Nash
- Christopher Cross
- Pablo Cruise
- Cutting Crew
- Paul Davis
- John Denver
- Dr. Hook
- Ned Doheny
- The Doobie Brothers
- Robbie Dupree
- Duran Duran
- Eagles
- Walter Egan
- Yvonne Elliman
- England Dan & John Ford Coley
- Exile
- Donald Fagen
- Firefall
- Fleetwood Mac
- Dan Fogelberg
- Foreigner
- Peter Frampton
- Marvin Gaye
- Andy Gibb
- Terri Gibbs
- Andrew Gold
- Bobby Goldsboro
- Henry Gross
- Daryl Hall & John Oates
- Herbie Hancock
- Dan Hartman
- Don Henley
- Bertie Higgins
- Rupert Holmes
- The Hues Corporation
- Joe Jackson
- Al Jarreau
- Jefferson Starship
- Billy Joel
- Sammy Johns
- Michael Johnson
- Rickie Lee Jones
- Marc Jordan
- Journey
- Chaka Khan
- Kool and the Gang
- Nicolette Larson
- Cyndi Lauper
- Huey Lewis and the News
- Gordon Lightfoot
- Little River Band
- Lobo
- Loggins & Messina
- Kenny Loggins
- Looking Glass
- Chuck Mangione
- Richard Marx
- Paul McCartney
- Van McCoy
- Michael McDonald
- Steve Miller Band
- Joni Mitchell
- Eddie Money
- Maria Muldaur
- Michael Martin Murphey
- Johnny Nash
- Olivia Newton-John
- Stevie Nicks
- Nielsen/Pearson
- Nitty Gritty Dirt Band
- Nigel Olsson
- Orchestral Manoeuvres in the Dark
- Tony Orlando & Dawn
- Orleans
- Ozark Mountain Daredevils
- Pages
- Robert Palmer
- The Alan Parsons Project
- Peaches & Herb
- Player
- Poco
- The Pointer Sisters
- Prep
- Pretty Things
- Pure Prairie League
- Gerry Rafferty
- Lou Rawls
- Raydio
- REO Speedwagon
- Linda Ronstadt
- Diana Ross
- Roxy Music (Avalon era)
- Todd Rundgren
- Brenda Russell
- Sanford Townsend Band
- Santana (Alex Ligertwood era)
- Leo Sayer
- Boz Scaggs
- Seals & Crofts
- John Sebastian
- Neil Sedaka
- Michael Sembello
- Carly Simon
- Spandau Ballet
- Starbuck
- Steely Dan
- Al Stewart
- Styx
- Supertramp
- James Taylor
- Three Dog Night
- Toto
- Gino Vannelli
- Frankie Valli & the Four Seasons
- Randy VanWarmer
- Bob Welch
- Matthew Wilder
- Steve Winwood
- Gary Wright

== Yacht soul ==
- Anita Baker
- Atlanta Rhythm Section
- The Bee Gees
- Dee Dee Bridgewater
- Peabo Bryson
- Natalie Cole
- El DeBarge
- Earth, Wind & Fire
- Roberta Flack
- Aretha Franklin
- The Gap Band
- Richie Havens
- James Ingram
- The Isley Brothers
- Jermaine Jackson
- Michael Jackson
- Brothers Johnson
- Quincy Jones
- Patti LaBelle
- The Main Ingredient
- The Manhattans
- Jeffrey Osborne
- Prince
- Lionel Richie
- Minnie Riperton
- Patrice Rushen
- Sade
- Nina Simone
- Sly & the Family Stone
- Tavares
- Luther Vandross
- Dionne Warwick
- Grover Washington Jr.
- The Whispers
- Wings
- Bill Withers
- Stevie Wonder

== Yacht country ==
- Glen Campbell
- Crystal Gayle
- Dobie Grey
- Merle Haggard
- Ronnie Milsap
- Juice Newton
- Oak Ridge Boys
- Dolly Parton
- Kenny Rogers
- Jerry Jeff Walker
- Don Williams
