= Yachtley Crew =

American band

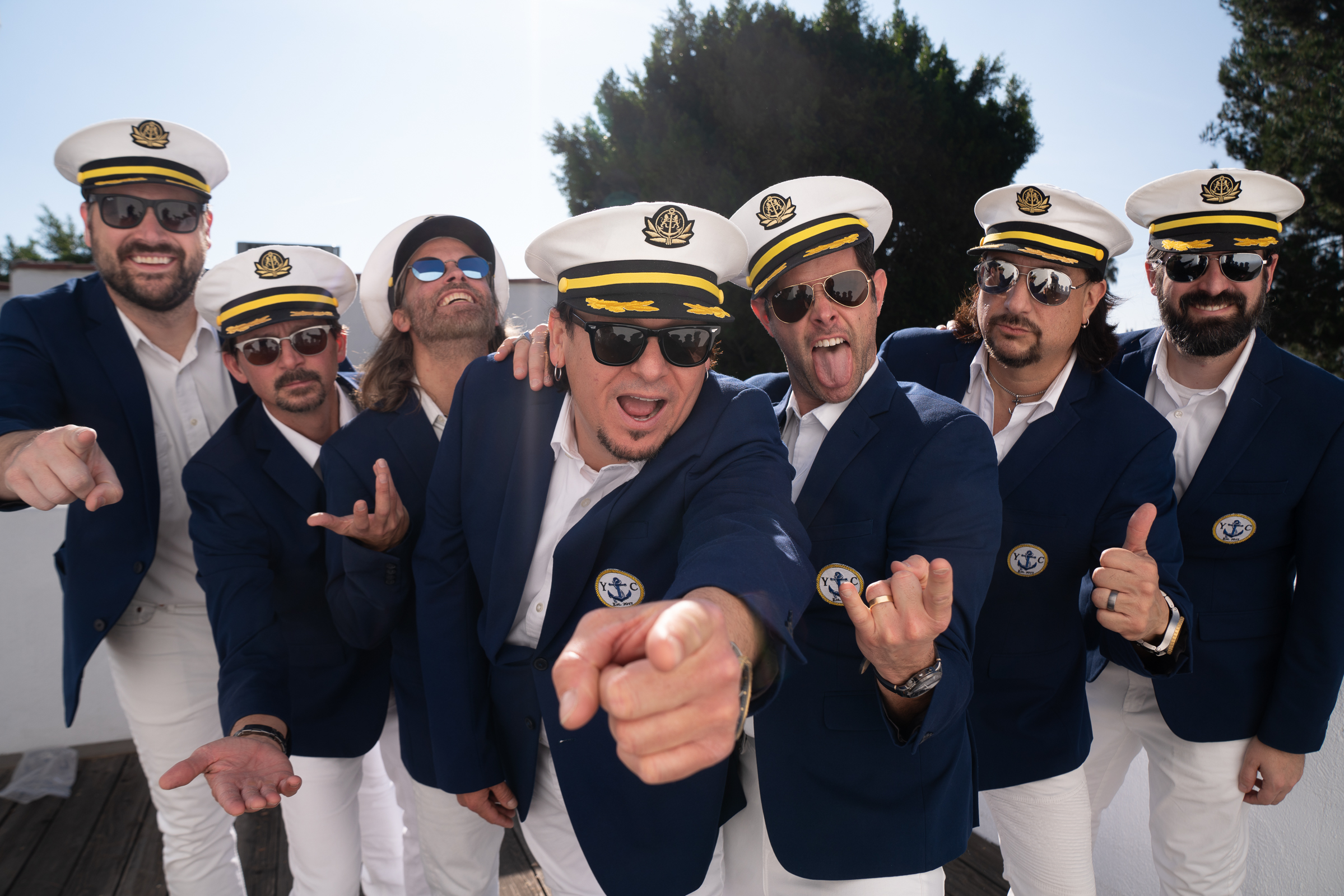
The band members in 2022

Yachtley Crew (stylized as Yächtley Crëw, with a metal umlaut over the a and e) is an American yacht rock band from Los Angeles, California, formed in 2017. The band is known for wearing nautical attire on stage while playing 1970s and 1980s soft rock hits.

Soon after forming, Yachtley Crew quickly gained recognition and was voted 2018's "Best Cover Band" by OC Weekly, who dubbed them "the Steel Panther of the high seas". On several occasions, they played with the original artists of the songs they frequently perform, including Elliot Lurie of Looking Glass and Peter Beckett of Player. Las Vegas Review-Journal wrote: "It would be tempting to describe Yächtley Crëw simply as a cover band. But it is more. It is a trend-setter, a movement, an ocean spray to the face during the torrid summer months."

After limited touring in 2020 due to the COVID-19 pandemic, the band played their first national tour across the United States in 2021. The band also toured with the LA-based pop trio Raynes. In 2022, Yachtley Crew announced that they had signed a record deal with Jimmy Buffett-owned label Mailboat Records. On July 14, 2023, they released their first album, Seas the Day. It was produced and mixed by Chris Lord-Alge.

They have played residencies at Palms Las Vegas for three years running.

Following Buffett's death in 2023, Yachtley Crew were permitted to seek another record deal. Subsequently, they signed to Earache Records in 2024 and released a Christmas mini-album titled Seas and Greetings, which was also produced by Lord-Alge. It featured covers of Status Quo's "It's Christmas Time", John Lennon and Yoko Ono's "Happy Xmas (War Is Over)", Charles Brown's "Please Come Home for Christmas" and Wizzard's "I Wish It Could Be Christmas Everyday", as well as an original song, "Home for Christmas".

That November, they appeared in the HBO documentary Yacht Rock: A Dockumentary.

The band has confirmed that they will release a new album in 2025, featuring the song "Pain of Losing You", which was written by Diane Warren. It will include a "handful of songs that everybody's heard from the '70s and '80s American songbook".

== Band members ==
- Ian Ward - Vocals
- Tommy Buoy - Guitar/Vocals
- Baba Buoy - Bass
- Sailor Hawkins - Drums/Vocals
- Stoney Shores - Synths
- Pauly Shores - Saxophone
- Matthew McDonald - Keys/Synths
