= Baby Come Back (Player song) =

- Side A of the US single

Single by Player

from the album Player
- B-side: "Love Is Where You Find It"
- Released: September 1977
- Recorded: 1977
- Genre: Soft rock; blue-eyed soul; yacht rock
- Length: 3:28 (single version); 4:15 (album version)
- Label: RSO (UK & Nor. Am.); Philips (intl.)
- Songwriters: Peter Beckett; J. C. Crowley
- Producers: Dennis Lambert; Brian Potter

Player singles chronology
"Baby Come Back" (1977)	"This Time I'm in It for Love" (1977)

Music video
- "Baby Come Back" on YouTube

Alternative image
- Side A of the UK single

"Baby Come Back" is a song by the British-American rock band Player. It was released in late 1977 as the lead single from their 1977 self-titled debut album, and was the breakthrough single for the band, gaining them mainstream success, hitting #1 on the US Billboard Hot 100 for the three consecutive weeks of January 14, 21 and 28, 1978 and #10 on the R&B charts in 1978. Their biggest hit single, the song was written and performed by Peter Beckett and J. C. Crowley, the founders of Player.

As reported on the American Top 40 broadcast of November 5, 1977, "Baby Come Back" was written after two of the band members had broken up with their girlfriends.

== Personnel ==
- Peter Beckett – lead vocals and backing vocals, electric guitar
- J. C. Crowley – acoustic piano, electric piano and backing vocals
- Ronn Moss – bass and backing vocals
- John Friesen – drums, maracas and congas

=== Additional personnel ===
- Wayne Cook – synthesizers, clavinet and electric piano

== Cover versions ==
In 2018, Australian band Ocean Alley included it as part of the Like a Version segment on the Australian radio station Triple J. The cover reached No. 16 on Triple J's Hottest 100 of 2018 and was certified gold by the Australian Recording Industry Association (ARIA).

The song has also been recorded by Lisa Stansfield. The song was also featured on Keith Urban's 2026 album, Flow State.

== Charts ==
=== Weekly charts ===
Chart (1977–1978)	Peak position
Australia (Kent Music Report)	15
Canada Top Singles (RPM)	1
Canada Adult Contemporary (RPM)	21
Netherlands (Single Top 100)	25
Netherlands (Dutch Top 40)	21
New Zealand (Recorded Music NZ)	4
South Africa (Springbok SA Top 20)	9
UK Singles (Official Charts)	32
US Billboard Hot 100	1
US Adult Contemporary (Billboard)	20
US Hot Soul Singles (Billboard)	10

=== Year-end charts ===
Chart (1978)	Rank
Australia (Kent Music Report)	73
Brazil	19
Canada	44
US Billboard Hot 100	7

=== All-time charts ===
Chart (1958–2018)	Position
US Billboard Hot 100	324

== Certifications ==
Region	Certification	Certified units/sales
Canada (Music Canada)	Gold	75,000^{^}
New Zealand (RMNZ)	2× Platinum	60,000^{‡}
United Kingdom (BPI)	Silver	200,000^{‡}
United States (RIAA)	Gold	1,000,000^{^}
^{^} Shipments figures based on certification alone.^{‡} Sales+streaming figures based on certification alone.

== In other media ==
The song is played as part of a joke in the 1992 episode "Homer Alone" of the third season of The Simpsons.

The song was played during the conclusion of SpaceX’s 15th Starship Test Flight, in which the Starship returned to the launch site in Starbase, Texas.

== Bibliography ==
- Joel Whitburn's Presents Top R&B/Hip-Hop Singles: 1942-2004, 2004, Record Research Inc., ISBN 978-0898201604
