= Joey Scarbury =

American singer and songwriter (born 1955)

- Born: June 7, 1955 (age 71)
- Origin: Ontario, California, U.S.
- Genres: Pop rock; soft rock; yacht rock
- Occupations: Singer; songwriter
- Label: Elektra

Joey Scarbury (born June 7, 1955) is an American singer and songwriter known for his 1981 hit song, "Theme from The Greatest American Hero (Believe It or Not)".

== Biography ==
=== Childhood and early music career ===
Scarbury was born in Ontario, California. Growing up in Thousand Oaks, he was continually encouraged in his ambition to sing by his mother. At the age of 14, after being spotted by songwriter Jimmy Webb's father, he was signed to a recording contract with Dunhill Records. Scarbury's first single, "She Never Smiles Anymore," flopped, and he was soon without a record label.

=== 1970s ===
Citing Dan Seals of England Dan & John Ford Coley as an influence, he stayed around the music business throughout the 1970s, first as a backup for artists including country artist Loretta Lynn, and occasionally recording his own material. Although he had a minor chart single with "Mixed Up Guy" in 1971 (#52 CAN), real chart success eluded him for the rest of the decade. He also covered The Partridge Family song from their debut album Point Me in the Direction of Albuquerque on the same label as them, Bell Records in 1971. Mike Post produced and arranged it.

=== 1980s and The Greatest American Hero ===
In the late 1970s, he started working for record producer and composer Mike Post. Post was hired along with Stephen Geyer to write the theme tune for a new TV series titled The Greatest American Hero, about an average high school teacher who comes into possession of a superhero outfit from aliens.

After recording the full-length version of the song, titled "Believe It or Not", it was edited down to a minute for broadcast as the theme song for the show. The show's success (along with its catchy theme song) prompted Elektra Records to first release it as a single, shooting up to number 2 on the Billboard Hot 100 and number 5 in Canada in 1981. A similarly titled album, America's Greatest Hero, was also hastily produced, and it also sold well. The song also reached #6 on the Canadian AC charts.

However, Scarbury could not follow the song's success, and after charting at number 49 (#24 CAN AC) with a follow-up single "When She Dances," he once again disappeared from the charts. He went on to work with Post again in the mid-1980s to record the song "Back to Back" for the television series Hardcastle and McCormick, and teamed up with Desirée Goyette to record "Flashbeagle" and "Snoopy" for the Peanuts special It's Flashbeagle, Charlie Brown. He also performed the opening theme for the television series Jennifer Slept Here, but never released another single in the 1980s. Scarbury also sang the recording on Splashdance album and rerecorded it for Donald Duck's 50th Birthday with new lyrics. He sang the demo for Disney’s Adventures of the Gummi Bears.

=== 1990s and songwriting ===
In 1990, Scarbury found success again as a songwriter. This time his co-written song, "No Matter How High", was recorded by the Oak Ridge Boys and was a number-one country music hit. His co-writer was Even Stevens, who previously had found success with co-writing songs for country star Eddie Rabbitt, as well as the Kenny Rogers hit "Love Will Turn You Around" from the motion picture Six Pack. In 1993, he teamed up with Jennifer Warnes to record the theme from the short-lived sitcom Almost Home.

Scarbury was invited to New York City by radio station WPLJ-FM in April 2005 to perform at the China Club in Times Square for a TV themes concert. He was joined on stage by other singers of popular TV themes, including Gloria Loring, Greg Evigan, Gary Portnoy, David Pomeranz and David Naughton.

== In pop culture ==
"Believe It or Not" was parodied on the season 8 episode of Seinfeld, titled "Susie", by Jason Alexander, playing his character George Costanza. George uses a version of the song as an outgoing answering message, with different lyrics ("Believe it or not, George isn't at home") and mistakes in the melodic line. Since Jason Alexander is an experienced singer in real life, he was told to sing as poorly as he could, after his first take of the song was judged too good to be funny. It was also used in the TV show “Til Death” season 2 episode 3 “Come Out & Play”. It was played during the faculty basketball game where the main character Eddie, who is very tall, played the game and let everybody know he wasn’t any good at it.

== Discography ==
Scarbury has released several singles starting in 1969 on Dunhill, followed by releases on Reena, Playboy, Bell, Columbia, RCA, Big Tree, Lionel, and Elektra labels.

Albums

- America's Greatest Hero (1981)

Charting singles

Year	Song	Peak chart positions		
Year	Song	US Hot 100	US Adult	AUS
1971	"Point Me in the Direction of Albuquerque"	—	—	—
1971	"Mixed Up Guy"	73	—	—
1981	"Believe It or Not"	2	3	2
1981	"When She Dances"	49	—	—
