= Craig Pilo =

American drummer (born 1972)

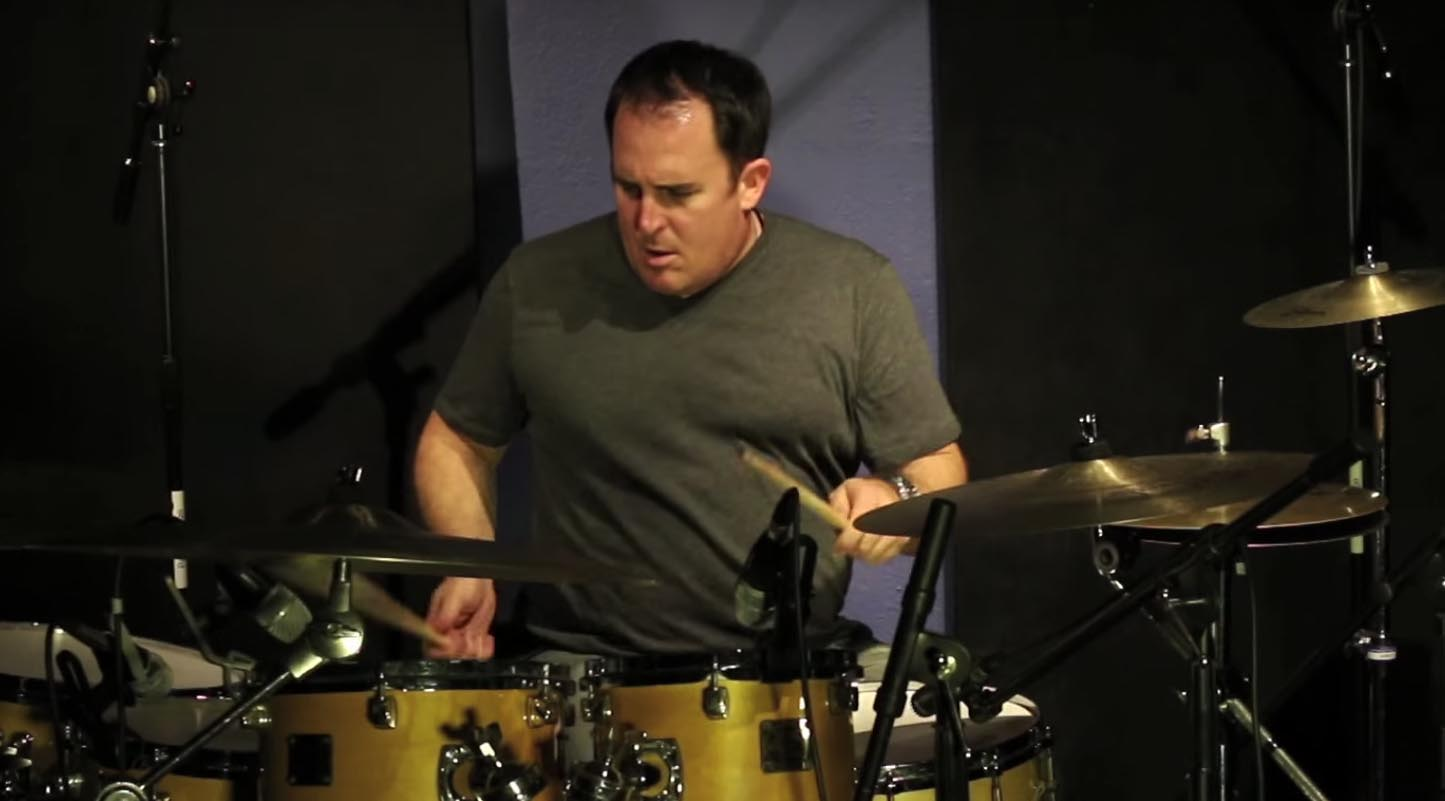
- Pilo in 2016

Background information
- Born: April 21, 1972 (age 54)
- Genres: rock, jazz, big band
- Occupation: Drummer
- Years active: 1996–present
- Website: www.craigpilo.com

Craig Pilo (né Craig M. Pilo; born 21 April 1972 Connecticut) is an American drummer who has performed with Frankie Valli & the Four Seasons, Maynard Ferguson, Edgar Winter, Deniece Williams, Pat Boone, the Red Elvises, and Player. The Los Angeles Music Awards (Note: The Los Angeles Music Awards was founded in 1991 by Alfred Bowman (né Alfred Connor Bowman; born 1958), who also, with Susanna Griffie (née Susanna Gayle Dennis; born 1959), founded in 2008 the Phoenix Music Awards, LLC, a former Arizona entity that dissolved March 19, 2015) named Pilo "Best Jazz Artist of 2007" for his debut album, Just Play.

== Career ==
Pilo received his bachelor's degree in drum performance from the University of North Texas College of Music in 1995, (Note: Pilo's graduating class included drummers Rich Redmond, Keith Carlock (Sting, Blues Brothers), Blair Sinta (Alanis Morissette), Adam Gust (LA Studio)) and soon began touring with trumpeter Maynard Ferguson on the "One More Trip To Birdland" Tour. Pilo's film & TV music department credits as drummer: Ally McBeal, Sex and the City, CSI: Miami, Malcolm in the Middle, Sabrina, The Osbournes, Basic, Boston Public, and Dirty Dancing: Havana Nights.

Pilo's mentors include Alan Dawson, Ed Soph, Dave Weckl, and Jeff Hamilton.

Pilo has performed internationally and coast-to-coast in North America. One such notable performance was with Frankie Valli, in a PBS/NPR special, A Capitol Fourth, July 4, 2014, from the United States Capitol, which had an attendance of 300,000 and a television audience of 6 million. Pilo has released three solo albums: Just Play (2007), Unsupervised (2011), and Drummer Boy (2014). He has written on the music industry for Modern Drummer magazine, and currently teaches drum performance and music business at the California College of Music.

== Selected discography ==
As leader

1. This-n-That (released 1997)
  Craig Pilo, Inc.
2. Just Play (released May 1, 2007)
  Roman Dudok, Doug Webb (soprano sax), Mitchel Forman (electric piano), Ed Czach (keyboards), Bart Somelis, Keith Hubacher, Tom Kennedy, Jim King, David Enos, Jonathan Pintoff (bass) Craig Pilo (drums), Byron Brock (bongos)
  Recorded in 2008, Reseda, California
  Rue De La Harpe Records 3 (CD) (Note: Rue de la Harpe Records, based in Granada Hills, California, was founded in 2002 to help cultivate and share the music of independent artists outside the mainstream)
3. Unsupervised (released March 21, 2011)
  Craig Pilo (drums), Jim King (bass), Ed Czach (keyboards), Bill Esparza, Chris Smith, Rick Baptist, Mitch Forman, Angela Carole Brown, Brandon Brigham
  Rue De La Harpe Records
4. Fused (released November 1, 2011)
  Pilo is co-leader with
  Rick Keller (né Richard H. Keller Jr.)
  Saxsonic Records (Note: Saxsonic Records the label of Rick Keller (né Richard H. Keller, Jr.), who is based in Rialto, California)
5. Guitar Jam (released March 1, 2013)
  Craig Pilo, Ken Rosser, Drew Zingg (born 1957; son of photographer David Drew Zingg), Jim Henken, Steve Gregory, Andrew Synoweic (né Brian Andrew Synowiec; born 1975)
  Available free online at craigpilo.bandcamp.com/album/guitar-jam
6. Drummer Boy (released 2014) (holiday jazz)
  Chris Smith, Bart Samolis, Mitch Forman, Ric Fierabracci, Robby Robinson, Rex Robinson
  Rue De La Harpe Records

As bandmember or sideman

7. Slow Club Quartet (jazz)
  Expressionism (released 2008)
  Ed Czach (piano), Angela Carole Brown (vocals), Craig Pilo (drums), Don Kasper (bass)
  Rue de la Harpe Records
8. Player (rock band)
  Too Many Reasons (2013)
  Peter Beckett (lead vocals, guitar, keyboards), Ronn Moss (lead vocals, bass), Rob Math (guitar), Michael Hakes (died 2003) (guitar), Michael Parnell (bass, drums, keyboards), J.C. Love (aka Johnny English, aka Jawn Starr) (keyboards), Steve Plunkett (drums), Craig Pilo (drums)
  Frontiers Records FR CD 589
  OCLC 847787741
9. Paul Kantner
  A Martian Christmas
  United States of Distribution
