= This Time I'm in It for Love =

Single by Player

from the album Player
- B-side: "Every Which Way"
- Released: February 1978
- Recorded: 1977
- Genre: Soft rock, pop rock
- Length: 4:25 (album version); 3:25 (single version)
- Label: Philips; RSO
- Songwriters: Steve Pippin and Larry Keith
- Producers: Dennis Lambert; Brian Potter

Player singles chronology
"Baby Come Back" (1977)	"This Time I'm in It for Love" (1978)	"Prisoner of Your Love" (1978)

"This Time I'm in It for Love" is a song recorded by the American rock band Player. It was the second single from their self-titled first studio album. The song was released in February 1978 as the immediate follow-up to their biggest hit and debut single, "Baby Come Back".

"This Time I'm in It for Love" spent four months on the US charts, hitting number 10 on the US Billboard Hot 100, and it is ranked as the 58th biggest hit of 1978. The song also reached number 12 in Canada.

== Earlier versions ==
The song had originally been recorded by Austin Roberts in 1976 and by Cyndi Grecco in 1977 both on the Private Stock Records label. Their versions were released as singles but failed to chart. Grecco's version was a promotional single, and Roberts' version was released only in the UK.

== Personnel ==
- J.C. Crowley – lead vocals (verses), backing vocals (choruses), keyboards
- Peter Beckett – lead vocals (choruses), lead and rhythm guitars
- Ronn Moss – backing vocals (verses & choruses), bass guitar
- John Friesen – drums, percussion

== Chart performance ==
=== Weekly charts ===
Chart (1977–1978)	Peak position
Canada RPM Top Singles	12
Canada RPM Adult Contemporary	25
US Billboard Hot 100	10
US Billboard Adult Contemporary	20
US Cash Box Top 100	13

=== Year-end charts ===
Chart (1978)	Rank
Canada RPM Top Singles	124
US Billboard Hot 100	58

== Bibliography ==
- Joel Whitburn's Presents Top R&B/Hip-Hop Singles: 1942-2004, 2004, Record Research Inc., ISBN 978-0898201604
