= Player (Player album) =

Studio album by Player
- Released: October 3, 1977
- Recorded: 1977
- Studios: Western Recorders, Hollywood; Sound Labs, Hollywood
- Genre: Soft rock
- Length: 38:43
- Label: RSO
- Producers: Dennis Lambert; Brian Potter

Player chronology
Player (1977)	Danger Zone (1978)

Player is the debut album from Los Angeles, California-based rock band Player, released on October 3, 1977 under RSO Records.

== Reception ==
Professional ratings
Review scores
Source	Rating
AllMusic	4.5/5 stars

It was released in 1977 on RSO Records and featured the hit single "Baby Come Back", which was written by guitarist/keyboardist/vocalist J.C. Crowley and guitarist/vocalist Peter Beckett.

"Baby Come Back" peaked at number one in the US and stayed on the charts for a total of 32 weeks. In the UK, it peaked at number 32 and remained on the chart for 7 weeks, the follow-up single "This Time I'm in It for Love" reaching number 10 in the US, staying there for 17 weeks.

== Track listing ==
Side one
No.	Title	Writer(s)	Length
1.	"Come On Out"	J.C. Crowley	3:43
2.	"Baby Come Back"	Crowley, Peter Beckett	4:10
3.	"Goodbye (That's All I Ever Heard)"	Crowley	3:44
4.	"Melanie"	Beckett	3:39
5.	"Every Which Way"	Crowley, Beckett	3:34

Side two
No.	Title	Writer(s)	Length
6.	"This Time I'm in It for Love"	Larry Keith, Steve Pippin	4:20
7.	"Love Is Where You Find It"	Crowley, Beckett, Reed Kailing	4:00
8.	"Movin' Up"	Beckett, Kailing, Steve Kipner	2:50
9.	"Cancellation"	Beckett, Kailing, Kipner	4:07
10.	"Trying to Write a Hit Song"	Ron Mahonin	4:36
Total length:			38:43

== Personnel ==
=== Player ===
- J.C. Crowley – guitars, lead vocals (1, 2, 3, 6, 7), backing vocals, keyboards, synthesizers
- Peter Beckett – guitars, lead vocals (2, 4, 5–9), backing vocals
- Ronn Moss – bass, backing vocals, lead vocals (10)
- John Friesen – drums
- Wayne Cook – keyboards, synthesizers

==== Additional musicians ====
- Reed Kailing – guitars
- Jay Lewis – electric & steel guitars, sound effects
- Gary Coleman – percussion
- Jim Horn – saxophone, flute
- Jack White – drums
- Michael Omartian – synthesizers
- George Budd – sound effects
- Maria Newman – string arrangements

=== Technical ===
- Produced by Dennis Lambert and Brian Potter
- Engineered by Jay Lewis, Joe Sidore, Matt Hyde
- Remixed by Jay Lewis
- Mastered by Brian Gardner at Allen Zentz Studio (Los Angeles, CA)
- Direction – Palmer-Roswell & Company
- Agency – Headquarters Talent
- Art direction – Susan Herr
- Design – Tom Nikosey
- Photo – Bernie Nagler

== Charts ==
=== Weekly charts ===
Chart (1977–1978)	Peak position
Australia (Kent Music Report)	47
Canada Top Albums/CDs (RPM)	15
US Billboard 200	26
US Top R&B/Hip-Hop Albums (Billboard)	32

=== Year-end charts ===
Chart (1978)	Position
Canada Top Albums/CDs (RPM)	94
US Billboard 200	62
