= Wayne Cook =

Wayne Cook may refer to:

- Wayne Cook (American football) (born 1971), American football player
- Wayne Cook (musician) (born 1946), American keyboardist
