= Steal Away (Robbie Dupree song) =

Single by Robbie Dupree

from the album Robbie Dupree
- B-side: "I'm No Stranger"
- Released: April 1980
- Recorded: 1979
- Genre: Soft rock, yacht rock
- Length: 3:34 (album version); 3:21 (single version)
- Label: Elektra
- Songwriters: Robbie Dupree, Rick Chudacoff
- Producers: Peter Bunetta, Rick Chudacoff

Robbie Dupree singles chronology
"Steal Away" (1980)	"Hot Rod Hearts" (1980)

"Steal Away" is a song by American singer Robbie Dupree, from his 1980 debut album Robbie Dupree. Released as the first single from the album, it became his biggest hit, peaking at No. 6 on the U.S. Billboard Hot 100 and No. 5 on the Adult Contemporary chart. In Canada, the song reached No. 14 on the Pop chart and spent three weeks at No. 2 on the Adult Contemporary chart.

In 2009, VH1 ranked "Steal Away" placed at No. 64 on their retrospective list 100 Greatest One-Hit Wonders of the 80s. This is despite Dupree having had a second top 40 hit with his No. 15-peaking single "Hot Rod Hearts".

== History and song information ==
The song was released by Dupree in 1980. It immediately charted in the top 20, becoming a big hit during the summer of 1980 and the driving force on his debut album. In 1991, John D'Agostino of the Los Angeles Times described the song as "a blatant, wimpy rip-off of the Michael McDonald/Kenny Loggins' composition "What a Fool Believes". The Washington Post noted similarities in both Dupree's vocal style and backing keyboards to "What a Fool Believes", mentioning that McDonald's publishers sought legal action, although McDonald himself did not accuse Dupree of stealing his song. This is somewhat ironic in that structurally, the song resembles BJ Thomas' hit single from 1968, "Hooked On a Feeling" more closely than it does "What A Fool Believes" (and even uses the same type of electric sitar line that was used in the Thomas recording).

In 2014 the song was used in the pilot episode of American television comedy drama series Red Oaks.

In 2017 the song was used in the American television crime drama series, Better Call Saul, in season 3, episode 10, titled "Lantern." The song was also featured on Keith Urban's 2026 album, Flow State.

== Chart performance ==
=== Weekly charts ===
Chart (1980)	Peak position
Australia (Kent Music Report)	24
Canada RPM Adult Contemporary (3wks@2)	2
Canada RPM Top Singles (2wks@14)	14
US Billboard Hot 100	6
US Billboard Hot R&B/Hip-Hop Songs	85
US Billboard Adult Contemporary	5

=== Year-end charts ===
Year-end chart (1980)	Rank
Canada	92
US Billboard Hot 100	26
