= Ronn Moss =

American actor and musician

- Moss in 2026
- Born: Ronald Montague Moss; March 4, 1952 (age 74); Los Angeles, California, U.S.
- Occupations: Actor; musician; singer-songwriter
- Years active: 1969–present
- Spouses: Shari Shattuck (m. 1990; div. 2002) Devin DeVasquez (m. 2009)
- Children: 2
- Website: Official website

Ronald Montague Moss (born March 4, 1952) is an American actor, musician and singer/songwriter, a member of the band Player, and best known for portraying Ridge Forrester, the dynamic fashion magnate on the CBS soap opera The Bold and the Beautiful from 1987 to 2012.

== Early life and music career ==
Moss was born and raised in Los Angeles. He grew up surrounded by the theatre, concert, and rock & roll music world. At age 11, he started learning to play the drums, guitar and electric bass. In 1976, Moss joined creative forces with fellow singer/guitarist Peter Beckett, singer/guitarist/keyboardist J.C. Crowley, and drummer John Friesen to form the band Player, primarily as bassist and singer. In a garage in the Hollywood Hills, they wrote and rehearsed the music that would soon attract the attention of music impresario Robert Stigwood, who signed them to his RSO Records.

In the first three weeks of 1978, their single "Baby Come Back" occupied the #1 position on the national pop charts & Player was voted to the Billboard magazine honor roll of Top New Singles artist of 1978. Their follow-up single, "This Time I'm in It for Love", also peaked at No. 10 the same year.

The Australian edition of his 2002 solo CD I'm Your Man includes a fresh duet of the original hit "Baby Come Back" and two bonus tracks: "That's When I'll Be Gone" and "Mountain". Moss along with his band toured Australia between August and September 2006. In 2007, he released his second solo album, Uncovered.

Player went on tour in 2015, with Moss and Peter Beckett playing dates with Orleans and Ambrosia, as well as a few Yacht rock shows with Little River Band.

After a lawsuit against former Player bandmate Peter Beckett for the use of the trademark name, Ronn will debut his band as Ronn Moss' Player for his future concerts.

Ronn is now solo and toured Australia again in March 2019 and toured Italy for the first time in mid-2019.

== The Bold and the Beautiful and other acting work ==
Moss played the Saracen hero Ruggero who fell in love with Bradamante in the 1983 Italian film Paladini-storia d'armi e d'amori (a.k.a. Paladins—the story of love and arms, a.k.a. Hearts and Armor) – a film based on the legends surrounding the Peers of Charlemagne.

In 1987, Moss was offered the role of "Ridge Forrester" on a new soap opera, The Bold and the Beautiful. He accepted the part, and the show was broadcast in many nations across the globe and his role has attracted millions of fans worldwide. To this day, Moss is best known for this role and he frequently travels overseas to visit other countries, make appearances, and promote his music; among the most notable of these countries is Finland, which Moss has visited several times since 1993.

1987 also marks the year of Moss' most critically acclaimed cinematic role as Rowdy Abilene in the Andy Sidaris classic Hard Ticket to Hawaii.

Moss has a large fan base in Australia. In 2002, he participated in a live performance of Sydney alternative rock band the Drugs' single "The Bold and the Beautiful" on Rove Live, playing bass guitar. In 2006, a campaign surfaced to vote Moss as Australian of the Year. Moss was featured in a very popular television commercial for Berri, an Australian orange juice producer. The punchline of the advertisement was "you can tell when it's not all Aussie"— a line intended to show (in jest) that, while Moss has longstanding connections with Australia, his Hollywood career has resulted in his persona differing significantly from that of the cliché Australian male. He has appeared occasionally on the former program Rove Live when in Australia. He takes part in sketches that are parodies of the daytime TV genre.

The Bold and the Beautiful was a very popular prime-time show in much of Europe; in 2010, Moss was a participant in the Italian version of Dancing with the Stars, finishing second with his partner Sara Di Vaira.

On August 11, 2012, it was announced that Moss would exit The Bold and the Beautiful, after having played the character of Ridge Forrester for 25 years. He made his last appearance on September 14, 2012.

In 2014, Moss appeared on Celebrity Wife Swap along with fellow soap star, General Hospital’s Tyler Christopher.

On May 12, 2014, Moss, along with his band, appeared on the ABC daytime soap opera General Hospital as part of the 2014 Nurses' Ball, where they performed their hit single "Baby Come Back".

In 2015, he played the character of Ian in the Flemish soap Familie.

Ronn played the role of John Blackwell on the digital soap The Bay, and as one of its producers shared in the four Daytime Emmys it received for Outstanding Daytime Digital Drama Series.

In September 2025 Moss was announced as part of the cast of Dutch television show Kees Flodder (part of the Flodder franchise).

== Filmography ==
=== Films ===
| Year | Title | Role(s) | Notes |
|---|---|---|---|
| 1983 | Hearts and Armour | Ruggero | |
| 1987 | Hard Ticket to Hawaii | Rowdy Abilene | |
| 1987 | Hot Child in the City | Tony | |
| 2000 | The Alternate | Fake President | |
| 2004 | Christmas in Love | Himself | |
| 2008 | Bolt | Dr. Forrester | Voice role |
| 2008 | The Boneyard Collection | Count Dracula | |
| 2009 | The Next Mrs. Jacob Anderson | Jacob Anderson | Short film |
| 2022 | Surprise Trip | Michael Dacruz | |

=== Television ===
| Year | Title | Role(s) | Notes |
|---|---|---|---|
| 1985 | Trapper John, M.D. | Paramedic #2 | Episode: "All the King's Horses…" |
| 1987–2012 | The Bold and the Beautiful | Ridge Forrester | Series regular |
| 2002 | Six Feet Under | Soap actor | Episode: "The Liar and the Whore" |
| 2015 | Familie | Ian | Recurring role; 4 episodes |
| 2015–2020 | The Bay | John Blackwell | Main role |
| 2018 | Rossi & White | John White | Television film |
| 2019 | This Is Our Christmas | Gatekeeper | Television film |
| 2026 | Kees Flodder | Stu Sterling | TV-series in The Netherlands |

== Discography ==
=== Studio albums ===
| Title | Release | Peak chart positions | |
| Title | Release | AUS | NLD |
|---|---|---|---|
| I'm Your Man | 2000 | 48 | 68 |
| Uncovered | 2005 | — | — |

=== with Player ===
- Player (1977)
- Danger Zone (1978)
- Room with a View (1980)
- Spies of Life (1981)
- Electric Shadow (Japan) / Lost in Reality (US) (1995/1996)
- Too Many Reasons (2013)

| Preceded by First | Ridge Forrester (role); 1987–2012 | Succeeded by Thorsten Kaye |
