= America's Greatest Hero =

Studio album by Joey Scarbury
- Released: 1981
- Studios: Smoketree Ranch (Chatsworth, California); Western I (Los Angeles, California)
- Genre: Pop rock
- Length: 34:42
- Label: Elektra
- Producer: Mike Post

Professional ratings
Review scores
Source	Rating
AllMusic	4.5/5 stars

America's Greatest Hero is the only studio album by Joey Scarbury, released by Elektra Records in 1981 on vinyl LP and cassette. This album features the hit theme from the TV series The Greatest American Hero, from which the album takes its name.

The album was reissued on CD by Collectables Records in 2005.

== Track listing ==
Side one
No.	Title	Writer(s)	Length
1.	"Theme from The Greatest American Hero (Believe It or Not)"	Mike Post; Stephen Geyer	3:13
2.	"Love Me Like the Last Time"	Dan Seals; Rafe Van Hoy	3:21
3.	"Stolen Night"	Randy Handley	4:18
4.	"There Is a River"	Geyer	3:31
5.	"Everything But Love"	Geyer; Joey Scarbury	3:24

Side two
No.	Title	Writer(s)	Length
6.	"Take This Heart of Mine"	Bruce Hornsby	2:59
7.	"When She Dances"	Brian Blugerman	3:22
8.	"That Little Bit of Us"	Geyer	3:41
9.	"Some of My Old Friends"	Geyer	3:01
10.	"Down the Backstairs (Of My Life)"	William Smith; Eric Mercury	3:26
Total length:			34:42

== Personnel ==
- Joey Scarbury – lead vocals and backing vocals
- Larry Muhoberac – acoustic piano, electric piano and synthesizers
- Todd Cochran – synthesizers
- Ian Underwood – synthesizers
- Larry Carlton – guitars
- Stephen Geyer – guitars and arrangements
- John Goux – guitars
- Leland Sklar – bass
- Neil Stubenhaus – bass
- Mike Baird – drums
- Jeff Gerson – percussions
- Mike Post – strings arrangements
- Linda Dillard – backing vocals
- Herb Pedersen – backing vocals
- Laura Mumford – backing vocals

== Production ==
- Stephen J. Cannell – executive producer
- Mike Post – producer
- Doug Parry – engineer
- Rick Romano – second engineer
- Paul Dobbe – strings recording
- Jim Shea – photography
- Ron Coro – art direction
