= Hot Rod Hearts =

1980 song by Robbie Dupree

Single by Robbie Dupree

from the album Robbie Dupree
- B-side: "Love Is a Mystery"
- Released: July 1980
- Recorded: 1979
- Genre: Soft rock, yacht rock
- Length: 3:45
- Label: Elektra
- Songwriters: Bill LaBounty, Stephen Geyer
- Producers: Peter Bunetta, Rick Chudacoff

Robbie Dupree singles chronology
| "Steal Away" (1980) | "Hot Rod Hearts" (1980) | "Brooklyn Girls" (1981) |

"Hot Rod Hearts" is a song by American singer Robbie Dupree, from his 1980 debut album Robbie Dupree. Released as the second single from the album, it reached No. 15 on the U.S. Billboard Hot 100 and No. 24 on the Adult Contemporary chart. In Canada, the song reached No. 42 on the Pop chart.

The song talks about a young couple, the protagonist and his partner, who fall in love while riding in the backseat of a car. They face danger from other people who want to interrupt their love, but they keep running away. The lyrics describe how their love is like a hot rod heart, and despite tough times, they keep going.

== Charts ==
| Chart (1980) | Peak position |
|---|---|
| Australian (Kent Music Report) | 58 |
| Canada RPM Top Singles | 42 |
| US Billboard Hot 100 | 15 |
| US Billboard Adult Contemporary | 24 |
