= Theme from The Greatest American Hero (Believe It or Not) =

1981 single by Joey Scarbury

Single by Joey Scarbury

from the album America's Greatest Hero
- B-side: "Little Bit of Us"
- Released: May 1981
- Genre: Yacht rock
- Length: 3:11
- Label: Elektra
- Songwriters: Mike Post; Stephen Geyer
- Producer: Mike Post

Joey Scarbury singles chronology
"Mixed Up Guy" (1971)	"Theme from The Greatest American Hero (Believe It or Not)" (1981)	"When She Dances" (1981)

Audio
- "Theme from The Greatest American Hero (Believe It or Not)" on YouTube

"Theme from The Greatest American Hero (Believe It or Not)" is a song composed by Mike Post with lyrics by Stephen Geyer, and sung by American singer Joey Scarbury. It serves as the theme song for the 1980s television series The Greatest American Hero. The track was later included on Scarbury's 1981 debut album America's Greatest Hero. In the first episode of the series, serving as the pilot and a double length episode, the theme song was played without vocals. Later in the episode it was used again a couple of times with Scarbury's vocals.

In a 2005 interview, composer Mike Post said that Joey Scarbury “was an artist that I was producing, and had produced on three different record companies before that – unsuccessfully in terms of hits, but successfully in terms of how great a singer he was.” Post recalled that producer Stephen J. Cannell told him, “This guy’s flying around in a suit and he lost the instructions, and he’s got this right-wing CIA agent for a control guy.” Post responded, “Cannell, this is nuts.” Post had written a theme song with lyrics by Stephen Geyer for the short-lived Cannell series Richie Brockelman, Private Eye, and Cannell suggested doing that again for this show. Post responded, “Yeah, that’s a good idea. We’ll call up Stephen Geyer and see if he can write a lyric where maybe he can make an analogy between love and flying in a suit.”

The theme song became a popular hit during the run of The Greatest American Hero. "Believe It or Not" entered the top 40 of the Billboard Hot 100 on June 13, 1981, eventually peaking at No. 2 during the weeks ending August 15–22, 1981, kept off the top spot by "Endless Love" by Diana Ross and Lionel Richie, and spending a total of 18 weeks in the top 40. On the Adult Contemporary chart, "Believe It or Not" went to number 3. It also peaked at the number one position on both the Cashbox and Record World Singles charts.

== Personnel ==
- Joey Scarbury – lead vocals and backing vocals
- Larry Muhoberac – acoustic piano, electric piano and synthesizers
- Todd Cochran – synthesizer
- Larry Carlton – lead guitar
- Stephen Geyer – rhythm guitar
- Neil Stubenhaus – bass
- Mike Baird – drums
- Mike Post – strings arrangements
- Linda Dillard – backing vocals
- Herb Pedersen – backing vocals
- Laura Mumford – backing vocals

== In popular culture ==
In the season 8 episode of Seinfeld titled "The Susie", an answering machine message consists of a parody of "Believe It or Not". As a tribute to the Seinfeld episode, the song appeared in a 2021 TV commercial for Tide that aired during CBS' telecast of Super Bowl LV on February 7, 2021, starring Jason Alexander, whose character George Costanza recorded the parody lyrics as his answering machine message.

In the Homestar Runner Halloween special "The House That Gave Sucky Treats", Homestar Runner dresses as The Greatest American Hero. When greeted, Homestar sings a parody of the America's Greatest Hero theme song.

In the Family Guy episode "The Man with Two Brians", while being launched off a ramp and flying through the air, doing a stunt similar to Jackass, Peter wears the costume from the show and sings the series' theme song. The opening lines (Believe it or not, I'm walking on air) were also spoofed in the title of third episode of the sixth season, Believe It or Not, Joe's Walking on Air.

In the My Name Is Earl episode "Didn't Pay Taxes", Earl and Randy sing "Believe It or Not" while trapped in a water tower.

In the Gilmore Girls episode "Tippecanoe and Taylor, Too", the show's fictional band Hep Alien perform a grunge version of the song at Jackson Belleville's rally for Stars Hollow Town Selectman.

In season 13, episode 3 of ER, "Somebody to Love", Dr. Archie Morris sings "Believe It or Not" while driving on the highway in Chicago, with the top down on his BMW convertible.

The song was also used as the opening theme for the Brad Jones comedy-review show, The Cinema Snob.

In season 9, episode 6 of the Warner television series Supernatural, "Heaven Can't Wait", Castiel sings the song to calm a crying baby whom he is babysitting.

The song appears in the 2021 film Free Guy, when Guy (Ryan Reynolds) distracts "Dude", his stronger doppelganger, by giving him glasses that show a player's view of the game.

== Chart history ==
=== Weekly charts ===
Chart (1981)	Peak position
Canada RPM Top Singles	5
Canada RPM Adult Contemporary	6
Ireland (IRMA)	19
New Zealand	1
U.S. Billboard Hot 100	2
U.S. Billboard Adult Contemporary	3
U.S. Cash Box Top 100	1
U.S. Record World Top 100 Singles	1

Chart (1982)	Peak position
Australia (Kent Music Report)	2
Ireland (IRMA)	28

=== Year-end charts ===
Chart (1981)	Rank
Canada	47
New Zealand	21
U.S. Billboard Hot 100	11
U.S. Cash Box	8
Chart (1982)	Rank
Australia (Kent Music Report)	9

== Certifications and sales ==
Region	Certification	Certified units/sales
Australia (ARIA)	Gold	50,000^{^}
New Zealand (RMNZ)	Gold	15,000^{‡}
United States (RIAA)	Gold	1,000,000^{^}
^{^} Shipments figures based on certification alone.^{‡} Sales+streaming figures based on certification alone.
