= GoodThunder =

American rock band

- Origin: Los Angeles, United States
- Genres: Psychedelic rock, progressive rock, hard rock
- Years active: 1971–1973
- Labels: Elektra Records (Original LP); Synton Archive Recordings (CD Reissue)
- Past members: James Cahoon Lindsay; John Desautels; David Hanson; Bill Rhodes; Wayne Cook; Terry Linvill

GoodThunder was a psychedelic/progressive rock/hard rock band that formed in 1972 as James Cahoon Lindsay (vocals and percussion), John Desautels (drums), David Hanson (guitars and vocals), Bill Rhodes (bass), and Wayne Cook (keyboard). Other members include Fritz Richmond (engineering), Rick Rodrigues (cover art), Lorrie Sullivan (photography), and Robert Heimall (art direction). Not much is known about this band except the information you find on the back cover of their first and only album. If you don't listen to it, the only thing that stands out on this album is the fact that famous producer Paul A. Rothchild (who produced albums by The Doors, Janis Joplin, and Rush just to name a few) produced this album. Most of the core band went on to join AOR band L.A. Jets, then most of L.A. Jets went on to record under the name 1994. Both L.A. Jets and 1994 included GoodThunder members John Desautels, Bill Rhodes, Terry Linvill, and included singer/songwriter Karen Lawrence. Wayne Cook went on to play keyboards with Steppenwolf and co-wrote the instrumental "Lip Service" from the Skullduggery album. Wayne Cook also played keyboards with Player on their first two albums, he filled in as keyboardist for Alice Cooper for a few shows, but was never a permanent member.

The song "Sentries" is notable for beginning with a few notes from a caliope.

== Discography ==
=== Studio albums ===
GoodThunder

Studio album by GoodThunder
- Released: 1972
- Recorded: 1971–1972
- Genre: Psychedelic rock, progressive rock
- Length: 38:44
- Label: Elektra
- Producer: Paul A. Rothchild

GoodThunder released their self-titled debut album in 1972. They broke up after the album was released. The original vinyl included a lyric sheet.

==== Track listing ====
Side One

1. I Can't Get Thru To You (Cook, Lindsay) - 3:18
2. For A Breath (Foster, Desautels, Foster) - 5:35
3. Moonship (Cook, Phifer, Lindsay, Cook) - 2:46
4. Home Again (Hanson, Lindsay, Hanson) - 6:48

Side Two

1. Sentries (Hanson, Lindsay, Linvill) - 2:36
2. P.O.W. (Hanson, Desautels) - 6:50
3. Rollin Up My Mind (Cook) - 4:11
4. Barking At The Ants (Hanson) - 6:39

==== Personnel ====
- James Cahoon Lindsay – lead vocals/percussion
- John Desautels – drums
- David Hanson – guitars/vocals
- Bill Rhodes – bass guitar
- Wayne Cook – keyboards

==== Production ====
- Paul A. Rothchild – producer
- Fritz Richmond – engineering

=== Various artist compilations ===
- New Magic in a Dusty World – 1971, includes Sentries
- Elektra September Releases – 1972, includes Sentries and Moonship
- Forever Changing: The Golden Age of Elektra Records 1963-1973 – 2007, includes P.O.W

=== Singles ===
- "Sentries" b/w "Moonship" – 1971
