= Raynes (band) =

American pop trio, founded 2017

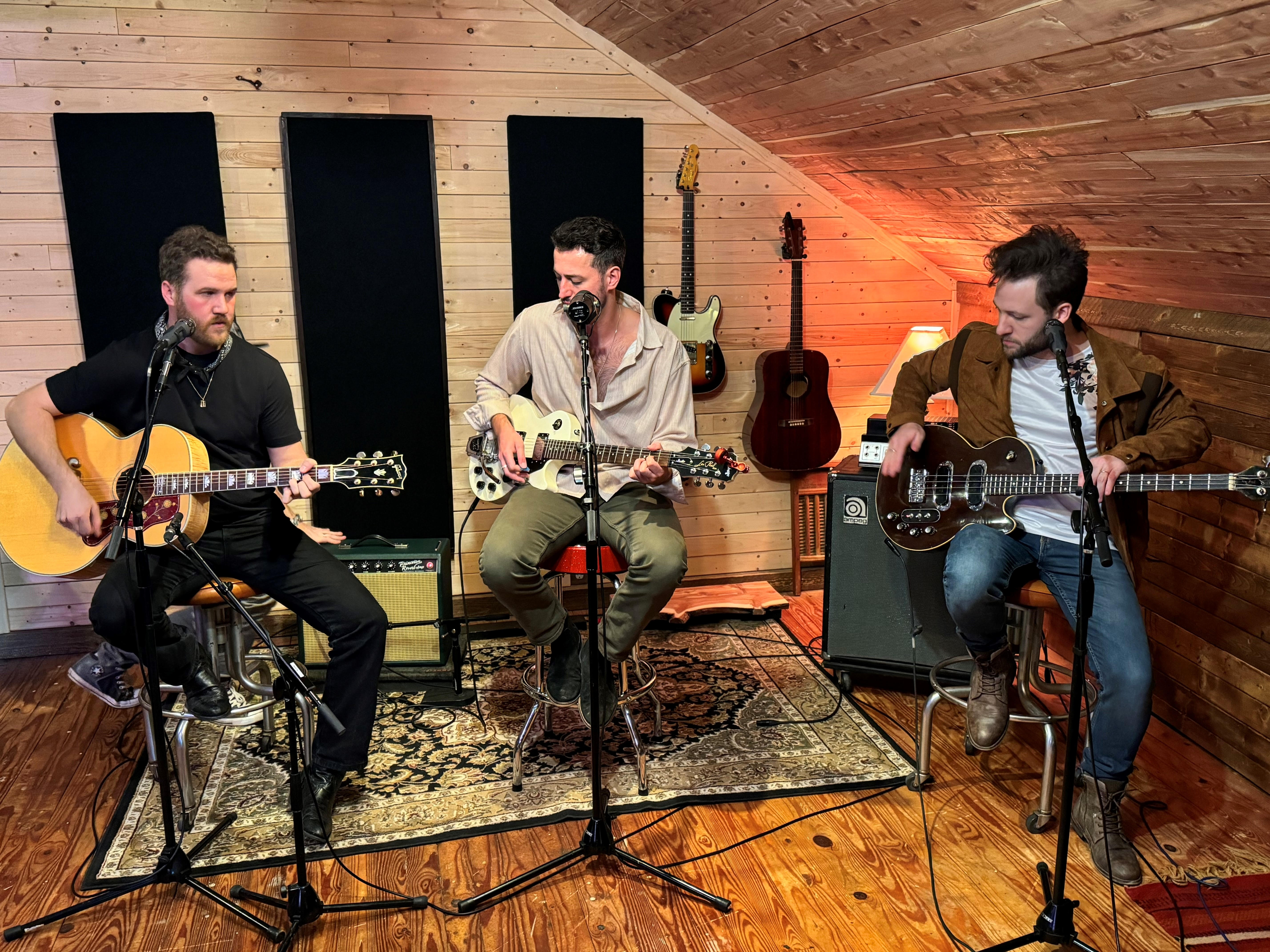
- Raynes record "American Waters" live at Wildfeather Recording in Hendersonville, TN on March 3, 2024

Background information
- Origin: Los Angeles, California
- Genres: folk; rock; folk pop; chamber pop
- Years active: 2017-present
- Label: Sony Music Publishing
- Members: Mat Charley; Joe Berger; Mark Race
- Website: www.raynesmusic.com

Raynes is a pop trio founded in Los Angeles in 2017 by multi-instrumentalist Mat Charley, guitarist Joe Berger and British vocalist/guitarist Mark Race.

== History ==
=== 2015–2017: Formation ===
Mat Charley, a native of Minot, North Dakota, met Mandan native Joe Berger as students at the University of Mary in 2015. Together, they moved to Los Angeles to pursue music full-time. Looking for a strong vocalist to round out their songs, they found Race, a singer-songwriter from Durham, on Instagram and asked if he would consider joining their group; he traveled to America 10 days later to meet the duo, and they found common musical ground.

"When Mat came across a video of Mark singing on Instagram, we instantly knew that this was the person we had been looking for," Berger said. "We didn't get our hopes up right away, though, since he lived in England and it seemed pretty unlikely that he would uproot his life for the band. But, long story short, that's exactly what happened."

The band's name came from an idea of Race's, who had a high school friend named Raine. "We wanted something that was one syllable, but plural, and something that sounded sort of unisex," Berger said.

=== 2018–2020: Early Recordings ===
After signing a songwriting deal with Sony/ATV Music Publishing (now Sony Music Publishing) in 2018, Raynes began working on music, partially from a stockpile of 60 demos they had written. With Race pursuing a work visa in America, their tracks were recorded with producer Mighty Mike. The trio released the singles "Lemon Drop" and "Second Thought" in 2019, promoting both songs with a U.K. tour. A third single from the same session, "Come My Way", was released in April 2020, the early weeks of COVID-19 lockdown.

=== 2021–2022: Set Fire to the Foxes ===
The members of Raynes continued working on music remotely, releasing their first EP Set Fire to the Foxes in 2021. It was the band's first work to be produced by Charley, who has done so for all their subsequent releases. In December of that year, they appeared on an episode of the ITV music competition series Walk the Line, marking their first performance together since COVID lockdowns. They were the only act to perform an original song on their episode, where they placed second and were eliminated.

=== 2023: A Ghost in the Walls ===
Raynes' next EP, A Ghost in the Walls, was released in 2023. All seven original tracks were released as singles with accompanying music videos that were all thematically linked. The EP also featured an orchestral version of debut single "Lemon Drop."

=== 2024: '49 and touring ===
Raynes announced their third EP, '49, in the summer of 2024. The five-song collection was inspired by the American gold rush. "There's a big metaphor there, because we dropped everything in our hometowns, moved to LA, searching for the 'gold', trying to make it big", Berger told Eat Play Rock. "And we just sort of came up short, we ended up moving back to wherever we wanted to move to. And there's just a really strong metaphor there that we can all relate to." Second single "American Waters" was premiered by People.

During the summer before the release of '49, Raynes toured with Yachtley Crew and also served as an opener for Ringo Starr & His All-Starr Band.

On October 9, 2024, Red Light Management announced that Raynes' former artist manager Gonzo Lubel died on October 8, 2024. It would later emerge that he had passed in a plane crash on Catalina Island. Raynes shared "Gonzo opened up so many doors for us when we were just starting out, for no reason other than love. One of the greatest. This is a devastating loss."

=== 2025: Touring and Bloom ===
On January 13, 2025 BottleRock Napa Valley announced that Raynes would be part of the lineup for the three-day music, wine, craft brew, and culinary festival taking place in Napa, California May 23–25, 2025.

On June 20, Raynes released a seven song EP entitled Bloom, which included several pre-release singles such as “Your Mouth is a Garden” and “It’s So Quiet Without You”. This EP focused on growth and renewal, with the music intended to ‘bloom’ throughout the album by starting as sparse acoustics and progressing to a full symphonic finish.

== Style and influences ==
Raynes have described their sound as "expensive folk", building on traditional acoustic arrangements with electronics, strings and other unique instruments. "The sonic core of our sound has always been built around acoustic instruments––acoustic guitars, mandolins, and violins, as well as some more exotic folk instruments like the bouzouki", the band told Atwood Magazine. "But because our songs are essentially pop songs, we like to add synths and more modern-sounding drum sounds as well. Our melodies, especially, are far more pop than folk, which is another big reason we don't really fit neatly into the folk genre." The group has cited the influence of nature on their lyrics and sonic texture, as well. "This grows readily from the instrumentation and arrangements, which we have always described as 'organic'—that is, 'real' and natural sounds rather than heavily processed and synthesized sounds," Charley said in an interview.

Charley has cited his time playing in his family bluegrass band as a key inspiration. Berger listened to hip-hop and country growing up, while Race has expressed an affinity for guitar-driven singer-songwriters like John Mayer. Other inspirations include Coldplay, Mumford & Sons, and The Beach Boys.

== Discography ==
=== EPs ===
- Set Fire to the Foxes (2021)
- A Ghost in the Walls (2023)
- '49 (2024)
- Bloom (2025)

=== Singles ===
- "Lemon Drop" (2019)
- "Second Thought" (2019)
- "Come My Way" (2020)
- "Cast the Bronze" (2021)
- "Tie Me Up" (2022)
- "Everybody Loves You" (2022)
- "Drive You Back Home" (2023)
- "Miami Underwater" (2023)
- "Not Just Anybody" (2023)
- "Maybe in the Morning" (2023)
- "Heaven Anymore" (2023)
- "A Shock to Your Heart" (2023)
- "White Dress" (2023)
- "Tie Me to the Tracks" (2024)
- "American Waters" (2024)
- "I'm Already Losing You" (2024)
- "Goldfish" (2025)
- "It's So Quiet Without You" (2025)
- "Your Mouth Is a Garden" (2025)
- ”I Want You to Want Me” (2025)
- ”American Waters - Orchestral Version” (2026)
- ”Roses All Over” (2026)
- ”Josephine” (2026)
- "Pure Blue" (2026)

=== Albums ===
- Radio Remind Me (2026)
