= Magnet and Steel =

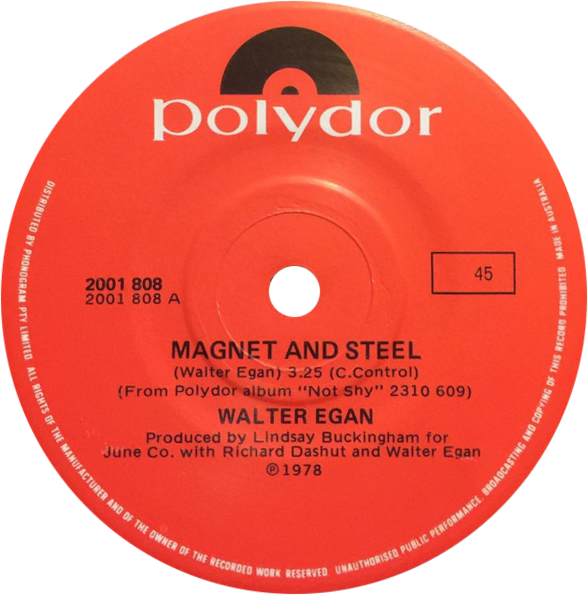
- Side A of the Australian single

Single by Walter Egan

from the album Not Shy
- B-side: "Tunnel O'Love" (U.S.); "She's So Tough" (International)
- Released: March 1978
- Genre: Soft rock
- Length: 3:25
- Label: Columbia (US); Polydor (international)
- Songwriter: Walter Egan
- Producers: Walter Egan, Lindsey Buckingham, Richard Dashut

Walter Egan singles chronology
"When I Get My Wheels" (1977)	"Magnet and Steel" (1978)	"Hot Summer Nights" (1978)

Music video
- "Magnet and Steel" on YouTube

"Magnet and Steel" is a song written and performed by American musician Walter Egan, and released as a single in March 1978. It was the first and biggest hit on Egan's second solo LP, Not Shy. It reached number eight on the U.S. Billboard Hot 100 and number nine in Canada. It spent 22 weeks on the American charts.

Stevie Nicks and Lindsey Buckingham, members of Fleetwood Mac, sang background vocals along with several others; Buckingham was also one of the song's producers, along with Egan and Richard Dashut. Nicks was also Egan's inspiration for the song.

== Later uses ==
"Magnet and Steel" was featured in Boogie Nights (1997), Overnight Delivery (1998), and Deuce Bigalow: Male Gigolo (1999). It was also heard in the Season 2 episode "Ohio" of the HBO series Divorce (2018) and in the film This is 40.

The singer Matthew Sweet recorded a version of the song for the Sabrina the Teenage Witch album with Lindsey Buckingham on guitar and backing vocals.

Egan and Donna Loren recorded a duet of the song in 2011. Loren released it on her YouTube channel 8 April 2025 to coincide with Egan's appearance on her podcast, Love's A Secret Weapon. The song was also featured on Keith Urban's 2026 album, Flow State.

== Personnel ==
- Walter Egan – lead vocals, guitar
- Lindsey Buckingham – guitars, background vocals
- Stevie Nicks – background vocals
- Annie McLoone – background vocals
- John Selk – bass guitar, background vocals
- Tom Moncrieff – guitar, background vocals
- Stephen Hague – keyboards, vocals
- Mike Huey – drums, percussion

== Chart performance ==
=== Weekly charts ===
Chart (1978)	Peak position
Australia (Kent Music Report)	32
Canada RPM Top Singles	9
France (IFOP)	60
New Zealand	7
U.S. Billboard Hot 100	8
U.S. Billboard Adult Contemporary	18
U.S. Cash Box Top 100	9

=== Year-end charts ===
Chart (1978)	Rank
Canada	68
New Zealand	46
U.S. Billboard Hot 100	40
U.S. Cash Box	59

== See also ==
- List of 1970s one-hit wonders in the United States
