= California College of Music =

Coordinates: 34.145098°N 118.129072°W

- Type: Private
- Established: 1999
- Location: Pasadena, United States
- Website: https://ccmla.edu/

California College of Music (abbreviated CCM) is a for-profit, contemporary popular music school in Pasadena, in Los Angeles County, California. The institution was founded in 1999 as the Pasadena International Music Academy, and changed its name to California College of Music in 2008.

== Academics ==
It currently offers a six-quarter Associate of Arts degrees in music performance in voice, guitar, bass, drums, and piano/keyboards as well as a four-quarter and two-quarter Certificate program in Music Performance and Songwriting & Music Production.

California College of Music is an accredited institutional member of the National Association of Schools of Music.

== Notable faculty ==
- Dom Capuano, music production
- Craig Pilo, drums, part-time
- Oren Waters, vocal performance and music education
- Phillip Ingram, former faculty member
