= The Wuzzles =

American animated television series

- Created by: Fred Wolf
- Voices of: Jo Anne Worley; Henry Gibson; Bill Scott; Brian Cummings; Kathleen Helppie-Shipley; Alan Oppenheimer
- Narrated by: Stan Freberg
- Opening theme: "The Wuzzles" performed by Stephen Geyer
- Ending theme: "The Wuzzles" (instrumental)
- Country of origin: United States
- Original language: English
- No. of seasons: 1
- No. of episodes: 13

Production
- Producer: Fred Wolf
- Running time: 23 minutes
- Production companies: Walt Disney Pictures Television Division; Walt Disney Pictures Television Animation Group

Original release
- Network: CBS
- Release: September 14 – December 7, 1985

The Wuzzles is an American animated series created by Fred Wolf and produced by Disney Television Animation (originally known as Walt Disney Pictures Television Animation Group) in their first of two productions. The series was broadcast from September 14 to December 7, 1985, on CBS. An idea pitched by Michael Eisner for his new Disney television animation studio, the premise is that the main characters are hybrids of two different animals. The series ran for one season of 13 episodes.

== Premise ==
The Wuzzles features a variety of short, rounded animal characters. Each is a roughly even, and colorful, mix of two different animal species (as the theme song mentions, "livin' with a split personality"), and all the characters sport wings on their backs, although only Bumblelion and Butterbear are seemingly capable of flight. All of the Wuzzles live on the Isle of Wuz. Double species are not limited to the Wuzzles themselves. From the appleberries they eat to the telephonograph in the home, or a luxury home called a castlescraper, nearly everything on Wuz is mixed together in the same way that the Wuzzles are. The characters in the show were marketed extensively: they were featured in children's books, as poseable figures and plush toys (similar to Care Bears), and in a board game.

Disney premiered two animated series on the same day in the same time slot, 8:30 AM ET, in the United States, with the other being Adventures of the Gummi Bears on NBC, and both series were successful during their first seasons. The Wuzzles ended production after its initial run. CBS canceled the show, and ABC picked it up and showed reruns during the 1986–1987 season; they aired it at 8:00 AM so that the two Disney shows would not be in competition with one another.

The series was a bigger success in the United Kingdom, where the first episode was released as a theatrical featurette in 1986 alongside a re-release of Disney's Bambi. In the United Kingdom, The Wuzzles and Adventures of the Gummi Bears were originally screened on the same channel (ITV) in 1985/1986; therefore, both series enjoyed high popularity. Reruns of the show were aired on both the Disney Channel and Toon Disney. Songwriter Stephen Geyer composed the theme song and performed the lead vocal.

== Characters ==
- The Narrator (voiced by Stan Freberg) is a never-seen narrator who welcomes the viewer to "the Land of Wuz" and is heard throughout each episode talking about different things.
- Bumblelion (voiced by Brian Cummings): Half bumblebee and half lion, Bumblelion is mostly lion in appearance. He is a short, squat, orange-furred creature with a pink mane, fuzzy antennae, a lion's tail, small insect wings, and horizontal brown stripes up his tummy. He lives in a beehive, likes sports, is courageous, and has a crush on Butterbear. He is said to be the sort who "rush[es] in where angels fear to tread". He and Eleroo are best friends.
- Eleroo (voiced by Henry Gibson): Half elephant and half kangaroo, and one of the larger Wuzzles, Eleroo is pink and purple, with the body shape and tail of a kangaroo and an elephant's trunk and ears. He has an orange hair tuft on his head and a horizontally striped pouch (despite the fact that pouches are found only on female kangaroos). Eleroo has trouble remembering what he stores in his pouch. He is sweet, but accident-/disaster-prone. He and Bumblelion are best friends.
- Butterbear (voiced by Kathleen Helppie-Shipley): Half butterfly and half bear, Butterbear is mostly bear in appearance. She has yellow fur with a white tummy, larger wings than the other Wuzzles, and short antennae with white flowers on their ends. She is a keen gardener who is gentle and patient despite the crazy adventures of her friends.
- Moosel (voiced by Bill Scott): Half moose and half seal, Moosel is the smallest and youngest of the Wuzzles. He is blue and purple, with a moose-like head with antlers and flippers like a pinniped. He has a vivid imagination, which makes him believe in monsters. He and Rhinokey are best friends.
- Hoppopotamus (voiced by Jo Anne Worley): Half hippopotamus and half rabbit, Hoppopotamus is called Hoppo by her friends. She is the largest Wuzzle, a blue and purple hippopotamus with rabbit's ears, buck teeth and a fluffy tail. She loves to sing and act. Hoppo is a pushy and demanding diva, but she can be sweet. When toughness is called for (particularly in dealing with the regular villain, Crocosaurus), however, she is the toughest Wuzzle of all. Hoppo has a crush on Bumblelion, but Bumblelion has his heart set on Butterbear.
- Rhinokey (voiced by Alan Oppenheimer): Half rhinoceros and half monkey, Rhinokey is mostly monkey in appearance. He has a rhino-like snout with a horizontal-striped horn, pink fur, and rhino-like legs. His posture is very much like that of a monkey's. Rhinokey is a fun-loving, happy-go-lucky prankster. He loves to play practical jokes, and can be obnoxious, particularly with Hoppopotamus, but he loves his friends. He and Moosel are best friends.

=== Antagonists ===
- Crocosaurus (voiced by Alan Oppenheimer): Half crocodile and half dinosaur, and the main antagonist of the series, Crocosaurus (normally referred to as Crock in the series) is bad-tempered, lazy, vile, ignorant, a bully, and does anything to get what he wants. He always wants the best of what the other Wuzzles have, but does not want to apply the effort to acquire it himself.
- Brat (voiced by Bill Scott): Half wild boar, half dragon, and Crocosaurus's chief sidekick, Brat sputters, raspberries, cries, laughs, yells, growls, and grunts in his speech, but Crocosaurus always understands what he is saying. Like Crocosaurus, he is very lazy and has a strong dislike towards the other Wuzzles coupled with a desire to have the best of what they have without applying any effort towards acquiring it. As his name implies, Brat is very bad-tempered and is often shown throwing tantrums when he does not get his own way. He is also greatly lacking in intelligence, and his incompetence often sees himself and Crocosaurus falling victim to their own devices, which in turn occasionally sees the two of them falling out.
- Flizard (voiced by Brian Cummings): Half frog, half lizard, and Crocosaurus's other sidekick, Flizard is not particularly intelligent, but he means well, is more amiable in his manner than either Crocosaurus or Brat, and relatively more tolerant of the Wuzzles, but nevertheless very loyal to Crocosaurus; on occasions where Crocosaurus and Brat fall out, it is often up to Flizard to try and patch things up between them. His character essentially emphasizes tolerance of others whom one is not particularly close to, while staying loyal to one's friends regardless of whether their plans are morally right or not. Flizard makes sporadic appearances throughout the series.

== Voice cast ==
- Brian Cummings – Bumblelion, Flizard, Peter Parafox, Molecrab
- Stan Freberg – Narrator
- Henry Gibson – Eleroo, Girafbra
- Kathleen Helppie-Shipley – Butterbear
- Alan Oppenheimer – Rhinokey, Crocosaurus, Mr. Packcat, Pirat Captain
- Bill Scott – Moosel, Brat, Officer Eaglbeagle, Dr. P.U. Quack, Mr. Beaverbuck, Pigmouse, Chef, Mover
- Jo Anne Worley – Hoppopotamus

=== Additional voices ===
- Gregg Berger – Tycoon
- Tress MacNeille – Mrs. Pedigree, Transylvia
- Will Ryan – Wishing Well
- Frank Welker – Mockingbirddog

== Episodes ==
No.	Title	Directed by	Written by	Original release date
1	"Bulls of a Feather"	Carole Beers	Mark Evanier	September 14, 1985
Eleroo adopts a Baby Brahman Bullfinch (part Brahman cattle, part finch) and is reluctant to part with it, especially when the other Wuzzles wish to return it to its original mother. Meanwhile, Crocosaurus plans to get wealthy with the baby Brahman bullfinch.
2	"Hooray for Hollywuz"	Carole Beers	Ken Koonce & David Weimers	September 21, 1985
Hoppo attempts to reach her dream of becoming a star in Hollywuz.
3	"In the Money"	Carole Beers	Ken Koonce, Bob Rosenfarb & David Weimers	September 28, 1985
Bumblelion finds money on the ground (which was stolen from the bank) and becomes rich, which puts a crimp in his friendship with the other Wuzzles.
4	"Crock Around the Clock"	Carole Beers	Ken Koonce & David Weimers	October 5, 1985
The stormy weather gets bad in Wuz, and with Crocosaurus's house destroyed, he takes up residence with Butterbear, conning her out of her food supply.
5	"Moosel's Monster"	Fred Wolf	Ted Perry	October 12, 1985
Moosel's imagination goes out of control when he accuses everything of being either a monster or an omen, and believes that a real and friendly monster is all in his head.
6	"Klutz on the Clutch"	Fred Wolf	Ken Koonce & David Weimers	October 19, 1985
The Wuzzle 500 road race has accelerated Rhinokey's crazy driving around town, leading to not only the trophy being lost, but him being one traffic ticket away from being banned. Crocasaurus schemes to ensure this to clinch the prize, which has been replaced with Eleroo's great-grandfather's trophy for Rhinokey to win. When Rhinokey narrowly avoids hitting Bumblelion to avoid Crocosaurus' trap, he swears off driving from guilt. Hoppo lobbies to sing the island's national anthem.
7	"Bumblelion and the Terrified Forest"	Fred Wolf	Ken Koonce & David Weimers	October 26, 1985
Bumblelion and Hoppo go deep into the Terrified Forest to rescue Butterbear from an evil witch (part vulture, part ape).
8	"Eleroo's Wishday"	Fred Wolf	Mark Evanier	November 2, 1985
Eleroo wishes to fly using the wishing well.
9	"Ghostrustlers"	Fred Wolf	Ken Koonce & David Weimers	November 9, 1985
With a plague in Wuz Town, the Wuzzles move to a ghost town that really is inhabited by ghosts (part polar bear, part chicken).
10	"A Pest of a Pet"	Fred Wolf	Mark Evanier	November 16, 1985
The Wuzzles get revenge on Rhinokey for playing jokes on them by playing a joke on him that makes him depart from Wuz.
11	"The Main Course"	Fred Wolf	Ken Koonce & David Weimer	November 23, 1985
After being attacked by Pirats (part parrot, part rat), the Wuzzles sail to an island where Hoppo is mistaken for a god by a tribe of Pigmice (part pig, part mouse) who intend to throw her into a volcano as a sacrifice.
12	"Class Dismissed"	Fred Wolf	Ken Koonce & David Weimers	November 30, 1985
When Butterbear is hired to make invitations to a ball, the other Wuzzles decide to get invited by bettering their class. Also, Crocosaurus makes a bet with Butterbear about turning Brat into a sensible and polite Wuzzle.
13	"What's Up, Stox?"	Fred Wolf	Ken Koonce & David Weimers	December 7, 1985
After visiting their new neighbor, zillionaire Tycoon (half tiger and half raccoon), the Wuzzles are given a money tree which they obsess over. Crocosaurus, however, plans to steal it for himself.

== Legacy ==
Butterbear and Rhinokey appeared in the DuckTales episode "The Lost Cargo of Kit Cloudkicker!" Unlike their original TV series' appearances, their designs are more realistic and animalistic and Rhinokey resembles a gorilla instead of a monkey. Additionally, they were created by a relic called the Stone of What Was, which bears Bumblelion's likeness and fuses any two animals that touch it into one chimeric monstrosity.
