= Player (band) =

American rock band

- Origin: Los Angeles, California, U.S.
- Genres: Soft rock
- Years active: 1976–1982, 1995–2003, 2007–present
- Labels: RSO, Philips, Casablanca, RCA, RiverNorth, Frontiers Records, Atlantic
- Members: Peter Beckett; Ronn Moss
- Past members: J. C. Crowley; John Friesen; Miles Joseph; Gabriel Katona; Rusty Buchanan; Tony Sciuto; Steve Farris; Michael Hakes; Craig Pilo; Dave Amato; Ron Green; Ron Wikso; John Walsh; Jimmy Carnelli; Rob Math; Buster Akrey; Burleigh Drummond; Mark Winley

Player is a British-American rock band that was formed in Los Angeles in the late 1970s. The group scored several US Hot 100 hits; two of those single releases went top 10, including the No. 1 hit "Baby Come Back", written by group members Peter Beckett and J.C. Crowley.

== Career ==
Player first came together in Los Angeles, California. The original members included Peter Beckett (vocals, guitar), John Charles "J.C." Crowley (vocals, keyboards, guitar), Ronn Moss (vocals, bass), and John Friesen (drums).

Beckett, an Englishman from Liverpool, had been in a progressive rock group called Paladin, followed by Skyband in 1974 with Australian Steve Kipner (who had also played with the Australian band Tin Tin, of which Beckett had also briefly been a member). At that time, Beckett, Kipner and Skyband were based in Los Angeles. After Skyband broke up in 1975, Beckett was still living there and met Crowley at a party. He and Crowley teamed up in a new band called Riff Raff, which soon changed its name to Bandana and released a single, "Jukebox Saturday Night", on Dennis Lambert and Brian Potter's Haven label. Steve Kipner and former Grass Roots guitarist Reed Kailing were also members of Riff Raff/Bandana, but Kipner was gone before the single's recording and Kailing was aced out after its release, though some of the Bandana tracks with Kailing's playing and co-writing later appeared on Player's debut.

When the Haven label folded soon afterward, Lambert and Potter brought the others over to RSO Records in 1976, and Beckett and Crowley started anew as Player with manager Paul Palmer, who brought in Moss and Friesen (a former percussionist and musical director for the Ice Follies). Wayne Cook, a keyboardist/session player and former member of Steppenwolf, was an additional band member for its live performances; he is the curly-haired keyboardist in the band's videos from the 1970s.

Player gained popularity as a live act during the heyday of the 1970s stadium rock era. They first went on the road in the fall of 1977 opening for Gino Vannelli, followed by Boz Scaggs. They began to develop a distinctive, edgy and melodic rock style. Their biggest hit, "Baby Come Back", released in late 1977, rose to No. 1 on the Billboard Hot 100 in January 1978 and was a chart success in other countries. Their follow-up single, "This Time I'm in It for Love", also peaked at No. 10 the same year. This makes it an error to claim, as VH1 and others have claimed, that Player was a "one-hit wonder". Among several notable accolades, Player was named Billboard's Best New Singles Artist of 1978.

Eric Clapton invited them to open for him during his 1978 North American "Slow Hand" tour. That was when the band started to change away from the "blue-eyed soul" sound of their debut album, leading to a much harder rock sound on their next one, Danger Zone, later that year. Beckett explained their change in sound: "When they put us on the Eric Clapton tour, the band took a turn to the left. Instead of sticking with the R&B Pop thing, which is what the first album was, we started to think we're gonna be onstage with Clapton, so we'd better write some Rock 'n' Roll songs. So, we grew our hair real long. We got the bigger amps, the 100 watt Marshalls and we started to change the band. And the band changed. Then, we stopped getting hits".

Later in 1978, keyboardist Cook left and was replaced by Bob Carpenter (who would go on to join Nitty Gritty Dirt Band). Eventually the band began to headline some of their own events, as well as continuing to open shows for artists like Heart and Kenny Loggins in the fall of 1978. But after playing a show with the latter at Coconut Grove in Miami, Florida, on October 29, 1978, tension among the various group members resulted in a huge blow up. When the smoke finally cleared, and after the group played a few more shows with Heart in late 1978, Beckett left the group and Player was without a record contract.

The remaining three, Crowley, Moss and Friesen, attempted to find a new deal and carry on but were unsuccessful. Crowley then decided to return to his native Texas, where he later pursued a career in country music. In the meantime, Beckett regrouped with Moss and Friesen to continue on as Player.

Player released four albums during their active touring years: Player (RSO Records in 1977), Danger Zone (RSO Records in 1978), Room With A View (Casablanca Records in 1980), the latter without Crowley, and Spies Of Life (RCA Records in 1981). After a long absence, Beckett brought Moss back into the fold in 1995 and, in 1996, Player released their fifth album, Lost In Reality, on River North Records. Two Many Reasons followed in 2013, on Frontiers Records. Like Reality, it was written and produced by Beckett.

== Lineup changes and dissolution ==
Miles Joseph (vocals, guitar) and Gabriel Katona (keyboards, ex-Rare Earth) joined Beckett, Moss and Friesen in the studio for the group's third album, Room With a View (April 1980), produced by Beckett with Tony Peluso on Casablanca Records. But when the album failed to sell in big numbers, Player was dropped by Polygram, after that company took over Casablanca completely.

By the end of 1980, Player wasn't active, recording or touring, so Moss decided to pursue an acting career. He originated the role of Ridge Forrester on the new CBS-TV soap opera The Bold and the Beautiful from 1987 until August 2012, after which he made the decision to not continue in the series after he was injured in an auto accident.

As Moss was occupied with acting, Beckett kept going as Player with Friesen, Joseph, Katona and Rusty Buchanan (vocals, bass, ex-Sugarloaf) and with producer Dennis Lambert back on board, released their fourth album, Spies of Life, on RCA in late 1981. The band continued until 1982 and played on the music series Solid Gold that year. But after this, the band once again found themselves without a record deal and elected to go their separate ways. Guitarist Miles Joseph later died of heart failure on December 25, 2012.

During the years following 1982, Peter Beckett worked mostly as a composer behind the scenes in movies and television. He also was a songwriter providing material for recording artists such as Janet Jackson, Olivia Newton-John, The Temptations, Starship, Kenny Rogers and more. He went on to become a member of Little River Band from 1989 to 1997 and played "Baby Come Back" at its performances. And during his time in LRB, he took time out to record a solo album, Beckett, released in 1991 on Curb Records.

J.C. Crowley (who still occasionally wrote with Beckett) became a Nashville performer and songwriter, recording his only solo album, Beneath the Texas Moon, in 1988. In 1989 he had country hits with "Paint the Town and Hang the Moon Tonight" (No. 13) and "I Know What I've Got" (No. 21), and was named "Best New Male Country Performer". He wrote a number of songs recorded by Nashville artists, including Johnny Cash and The Oak Ridge Boys. He recovered from cancer in the late 1990s and now lives in Topanga Canyon, California.

== Return ==
Although the original lineup of Player had disbanded, Beckett and Moss rejoined forces to work on a solo album for Moss, but the duo ended up recording an additional studio album as Player instead, released in Japan in August 1995 as Electric Shadow and renamed Lost in Reality when put out on River North Records in the U.S. in May 1996.

On December 16, 1997, Player played live for the first time in years at the L.A. Music Awards at the Hollywood Palladium with a lineup consisting of Beckett, Moss, Elliot Easton (of The Cars) on guitar, Burleigh Drummond of Ambrosia on drums and Tony Sciuto of Little River Band on keyboards. A compilation album, Best of Player, was released in 1998.

The response to the group's reunion show was so enthusiastic that they had several offers for more concert dates. River North Records dropped the band and Player tried to buy back the rights to the Lost in Reality CD but were unsuccessful.

Player toured in the spring of 1998 with a lineup of Beckett, Moss, Sciuto, Drummond, guitarist Steve Farris (formerly of Mr. Mister) and percussionist Ron Green, with guitarist Dave Amato (from REO Speedwagon) and drummer Ron Wikso (formerly of Foreigner and The Storm) filling in for Farris and Drummond as needed, depending on the schedules of the others.

In 2000 the lineup of Player included: drummer Craig Pilo, guitarist Michael Hakes, Green, Sciuto, Moss and Beckett playing more shows across the United States. But Michael Hakes died on November 19, 2003, of complications from leukemia. After Hakes' death, the band stopped touring and concentrated on other projects.

In 2007 Player reunited once again with a lineup of: Beckett, Moss, Pilo, Green, Ricky Zacharaides (guitar) and Ed Roth (keyboards). Percussionist Ron Green last appeared with Player in 2008.

By 2009, Rob Math (guitar) and keyboardist Johnny English (now known as Jawn Star) had come in to replace Zacharaides and Roth.

On November 14, 2009, J.C. Crowley temporarily reunited with Beckett and Moss at Agua Caliente Casino Resort Spa in Rancho Mirage, California, for a tribute concert to Dennis Lambert in a charity benefiting the Desert Arc Foundation.

In February 2013 Player (Beckett and Moss) released their new album, Too Many Reasons, on Frontiers Records. They toured throughout the United States and Canada over the summer as part of the Sail Rock 2013 with Christopher Cross, Gary Wright, Al Stewart, Orleans, Firefall, Robbie Dupree and John Ford Coley.

Quiet Riot's drummer, Frankie Banali, guested with Player on June 3, 2013, for a charity concert in Agoura, CA.

Roger Williams' drummer, Jimmy Carnelli, took over as their new drummer in 2014 and Player did an extensive tour of Australia in November 2014 promoted as "An Intimate Evening with Ronn Moss & Player", playing up Ronn's huge popularity Down Under.

Beckett and Moss split off from the last incarnation of the band to tour with another band, the Yacht Rock Revue, both on cruise ships and other venues around the U.S in 2014. In 2015 Beckett and Moss appeared on tour with Rock The Yacht 2015 with Little River Band as well as various dates with Orleans and Ambrosia.

The two continued to tour in 2017 together, then separately: Peter Beckett as "The Voice of Player" and Moss as "Ronn Moss & Friends". Moss, though still listed an official member of the band, wasn't appearing with them in the latter part of 2017, where Mark Winley (ex-Johnny Winter) was standing in for him, alongside Beckett, Math, drummer Burleigh Drummond and new Singer/keyboardist Buster Akrey, known for writing the Power Rangers music.

In the summer of 2018, Beckett appeared with Rock The Yacht 2018 alongside Ambrosia, John Ford Coley, Robbie Dupree and Stephen Bishop.

Ronn Moss did his fourth solo tour of Australia with Player band mate Jawn Star in March 2019 and was slated to tour Italy for the first time in the summer of 2019 as well as releasing a new album, My Baby's Back.

In the meantime, Beckett continued to tour in 2019 as Peter Beckett's Player with Rob Math, Burleigh Drummond, Buster Akrey and Mark Winley.

=== Lawsuit and settlement ===
In May 2018, Ronn Moss filed a lawsuit against former Player bandmate Peter Beckett over rights to the band's trademark. In November 2018, Moss and Beckett reached a settlement resulting in a stipulated court order, which stated that both Moss and Beckett owned common rights to the Player name and that the “mark is valid, subsisting, and enforceable."

The court further ordered the U.S. Patent & Trademark Office to update the registration for the Player trademark to “Peter Beckett and Ronn Moss, DBA", an unincorporated partnership. In the joint press release announcing their settlement, Moss and Beckett stated that in order to avoid any potential fan confusion, Moss and Becket have agreed to add their own name in front of the Player mark whenever they use it – i.e. Peter Beckett's Player or Ronn Moss’ Player. According to the court order, the use of the name by either Beckett or Moss for individual use "without the consent of the other and in a manner which does not constitute fair use, is likely to cause consumer confusion as the source or sponsorship of such goods or services."

== Side projects ==
Moss (with Beckett) has recorded two solo albums: I'm Your Man (2000) and Uncovered (2005). Both Moss and Beckett continue to play limited concert schedules as solo artists and teamed up to play in Australia in 2006 in support of Uncovered.

On May 12, 2014, Player appeared on ABC's daytime drama/soap opera "General Hospital" as a surprise guest for the annual "Nurses Ball" segment. That lineup was Beckett (vocals, guitar), Moss (vocals, bass), Rob Math (vocals, guitar), Jawn Star (vocals, keyboard), and Bryan Hitt (drummer for REO Speedwagon).

== Discography ==
=== Studio albums ===
Year	Album	Chart positions	
Year	Album	US	US R&B
1977	Player	26	32
1978	Danger Zone	37	—
1980	Room with a View	—	—
1982	Spies of Life	152	—
1995	Electric Shadow (Japan) / Lost in Reality (US)	—	—
2013	Too Many Reasons	—	—
"–" denotes releases that did not chart.

=== Compilation albums ===
- Baby Come Back (1978)
- Best of Player (1990)
- The Best of Player – Baby Come Back (1998)

=== Singles ===
Year	Single	Peak chart positions							Certifications (sales thresholds)	Album
Year	Single	US	US R&B	AUS	CAN	NED	NZ	UK	Certifications (sales thresholds)	Album
1977	"Baby Come Back"	1	10	15	1	21	4	32	RIAA: Gold; BPI: Silver; MC: Gold; RMNZ: 2× Platinum	Player
1978	"This Time I'm in It for Love"	10	—	—	12	—	—	—		Player
1978	"I Just Wanna Be with You"	—	—	—	—	—	—	—		Danger Zone
1978	"Prisoner of Your Love"	27	—	—	32	—	—	—		Danger Zone
1978	"Silver Lining"	62	—	—	83	—	—	—		Danger Zone
1980	"It's for You"	46	—	—	—	—	—	—		Room with a View
1980	"Givin' It All"	105	—	—	—	—	—	—		Room with a View
1980	"Room with a View"	—	—	—	—	—	—	—		Room with a View
1981	"If Looks Could Kill"	48	—	—	—	—	—	—		Spies of Life
1982	"I'd Rather Be Gone"	—	—	—	—	—	—	—		Spies of Life
1982	"Thank You for the Use of Your Love"	—	—	—	—	—	—	—		Spies of Life
1982	"It Only Hurts When I Breathe"	—	—	—	—	—	—	—		Spies of Life
"—" denotes releases that did not chart
