= Paint the Town and Hang the Moon Tonight =

Single by J.C. Crowley

from the album Beneath the Texas Moon
- B-side: "Serenade"
- Released: October 1988
- Genre: Country
- Length: 2:45
- Label: RCA
- Songwriters: J.C. Crowley; Jack Wesley Routh
- Producers: Josh Leo; Larry Michael Lee

J.C. Crowley singles chronology
"Boxcar 109" (1988)	"Paint the Town and Hang the Moon Tonight" (1988)	"I Know What I've Got" (1989)

"Paint the Town and Hang the Moon Tonight" is a song recorded by American country music artist J.C. Crowley. It was released in October 1988 as the second single from his album Beneath the Texas Moon. The song peaked at number 13 on the Billboard Hot Country Singles chart.

== Chart performance ==
Chart (1988–1989)	Peak position
US Hot Country Songs (Billboard)	13

=== Year-end charts ===
Chart (1989)	Position
Canada Country Tracks (RPM)	92
