= Beneath the Texas Moon =

Studio album by J.C. Crowley
- Released: 1988
- Genre: Country
- Length: 36:49
- Label: RCA
- Producer: Josh Leo; Larry Michael Lee

Singles from Beneath the Texas Moon
- 1. "Boxcar 109" Released: July 1988; 2. "Paint the Town and Hang the Moon Tonight" Released: October 1988; 3. "I Know What I've Got" Released: February 1989; 4. "Beneath the Texas Moon" Released: June 1989

Beneath the Texas Moon is the debut album by American country music artist J.C. Crowley. It was released in 1988 via RCA Records. The album includes the singles "Boxcar 109", "Paint the Town and Hang the Moon Tonight", "I Know What I've Got" and the title track.

== Track listing ==
No.	Title	Writer(s)	Length
1.	"Paint the Town and Hang the Moon Tonight"	J.C. Crowley, Jack Wesley Routh	2:45
2.	"Harder Than It Sounds"	Crowley, Jeff Silbar	3:26
3.	"Living for the Fire"	Crowley, Josh Leo, Wendy Waldman	4:56
4.	"Beneath the Texas Moon"	Crowley, Routh	3:49
5.	"Serenade"	Crowley, Routh	2:29
6.	"Dirty Shoes"	Leo, Harry Stinson	3:23
7.	"Boxcar 109"	Leo, Stinson	3:21
8.	"Right as Rain"	Crowley, Leo, Waldman	4:47
9.	"Beyond the Great Divide"	Crowley, Routh	5:03
10.	"I Know What I've Got"	Crowley, Silbar	2:50

== Chart performance ==
=== Singles ===
Year	Single	Peak chart positions	
Year	Single	US Country	CAN Country
1988	"Boxcar 109"	49	*
1988	"Paint the Town and Hang the Moon Tonight"	13	*
1989	"I Know What I've Got"	21	12
1989	"Beneath the Texas Moon"	55	66
* denotes unknown peak positions
