= I Know What I've Got =

Single by J.C. Crowley

from the album Beneath the Texas Moon
- B-side: "Living for the Fire"
- Released: February 1989
- Genre: Country
- Length: 2:50
- Label: RCA
- Songwriters: J.C. Crowley; Jeff Silbar
- Producers: Josh Leo; Larry Michael Lee

J.C. Crowley singles chronology
"Paint the Town and Hang the Moon Tonight" (1988)	"I Know What I've Got" (1989)	"Beneath the Texas Moon" (1989)

"I Know What I've Got" is a song recorded by American country music artist J.C. Crowley. It was released in February 1989 as the third single from his album Beneath the Texas Moon. The song peaked at number 21 on the Billboard Hot Country Singles chart and reached number 12 on the RPM Country Tracks chart in Canada.

== Chart performance ==
Chart (1989)	Peak position
Canada Country Singles (RPM)	12
US Hot Country Songs (Billboard)	21
