= Stephen Geyer =

American songwriter (born 1950)

- Born: November 21, 1950 (age 75); Lima, Peru
- Occupation: Songwriter
- Years active: 1973–present
- Notable work: "Believe It Or Not" (with Mike Post), “Hot Rod Hearts” (with Bill LaBounty)
- Awards: 2× BMI TV Music Award (1989, 1993)

Stephen George Geyer (born November 21, 1950) is an American songwriter best known for his work in television. He is also a studio and performance guitarist and has written scripts for TV.

== Biography ==
Geyer was born in Lima, Peru, the son of a CIA operative. He spent most of his formative years overseas, including in England where he began his professional musical career during the early Beatles years. He moved to Los Angeles in 1972 after attending Towson State College (now Towson University), in Maryland, as an art major.

In 1973, after having performed at the BMI showcase in the Capitol Records building in hopes of landing a recording and publishing deal, Geyer was referred by BMI vice president Ron Anton to Mike Post, a rising star in TV scoring and record production. A twenty-year musical collaboration ensued, yielding several TV theme songs, including “Drive” and “Back To Back” for Hardcastle and McCormick, “My Opinionation” for Blossom, and “Believe It Or Not” for The Greatest American Hero, which rose to the #1 position on the Record World Chart and to the #2 position on the Billboard Hot 100 in 1981.

Geyer has the distinction of being the original songwriter (music & lyrics) for all 30 of the original episodic songs recorded for The Greatest American Hero. He also has written other material for a variety of Stephen J. Cannell productions, including The A-Team, Riptide and Stingray. Geyer and Post penned songs for a number of TV movies, including "Harvest" from the 1974's Locusts, starring Ron Howard, as well as several songs for the Tommy Lee Jones independent film The River Rat.

Joining forces with another noted composer, Charles Fox, Geyer wrote “Together Through The Years”, the theme for the variously named Valerie Harper series (i.e.The Hogan Family) as well as five songs for the soundtrack to the Scott Baio debut movie, Zapped. In 1990, Geyer was called upon to write and to supervise the songwriting staff of Steven Bochco’s harshly critiqued Cop Rock television series, now considered something of a TV cult classic. Geyer co-wrote, with Gary Stockdale, the song "Who Knows You Better" for Angela Bofill.

Geyer’s guitar chops quickly evolved as he worked beside the cream of L.A.’s session players on Mike Post’s record and scoring dates, and soon he was being called upon for his guitar work and musical leadership in the studio and on the road, touring with a number of artists, including Jonathan Edwards, Herb Pedersen and Carole Bayer Sager.

Other noted Geyer songs include, “Hot Rod Hearts”, co-written with Bill LaBounty (#15 Billboard Hot 100 hit by Robbie Dupree), “Bloodline” (title song of Glen Campbell’s #1 country album), “Love Brought Us Here Tonight” (gold album by Smokey Robinson), “You Turn The Light On” (#1 platinum album by Kenny Rogers), and “Dreams” (gold album by John Denver).

Geyer has received several BMI awards for his songwriting, as well as an Emmy nomination for his song “Dreams” from an episode of the television show The Greatest American Hero. Not limited strictly to writing, Geyer also performed the lead vocal on the theme song for the 80's Disney television show The Wuzzles.

In addition to his work in music, Geyer has penned several scripts for television, including his work as staff-writer for the Mario Van Peebles series Sonny Spoon, and two scripts for the series Silk Stalkings. Three of his original film scripts have been sold and put into development, and he is currently working on a fourth.
