= Robbie Dupree =

American singer-songwriter (born 1946)

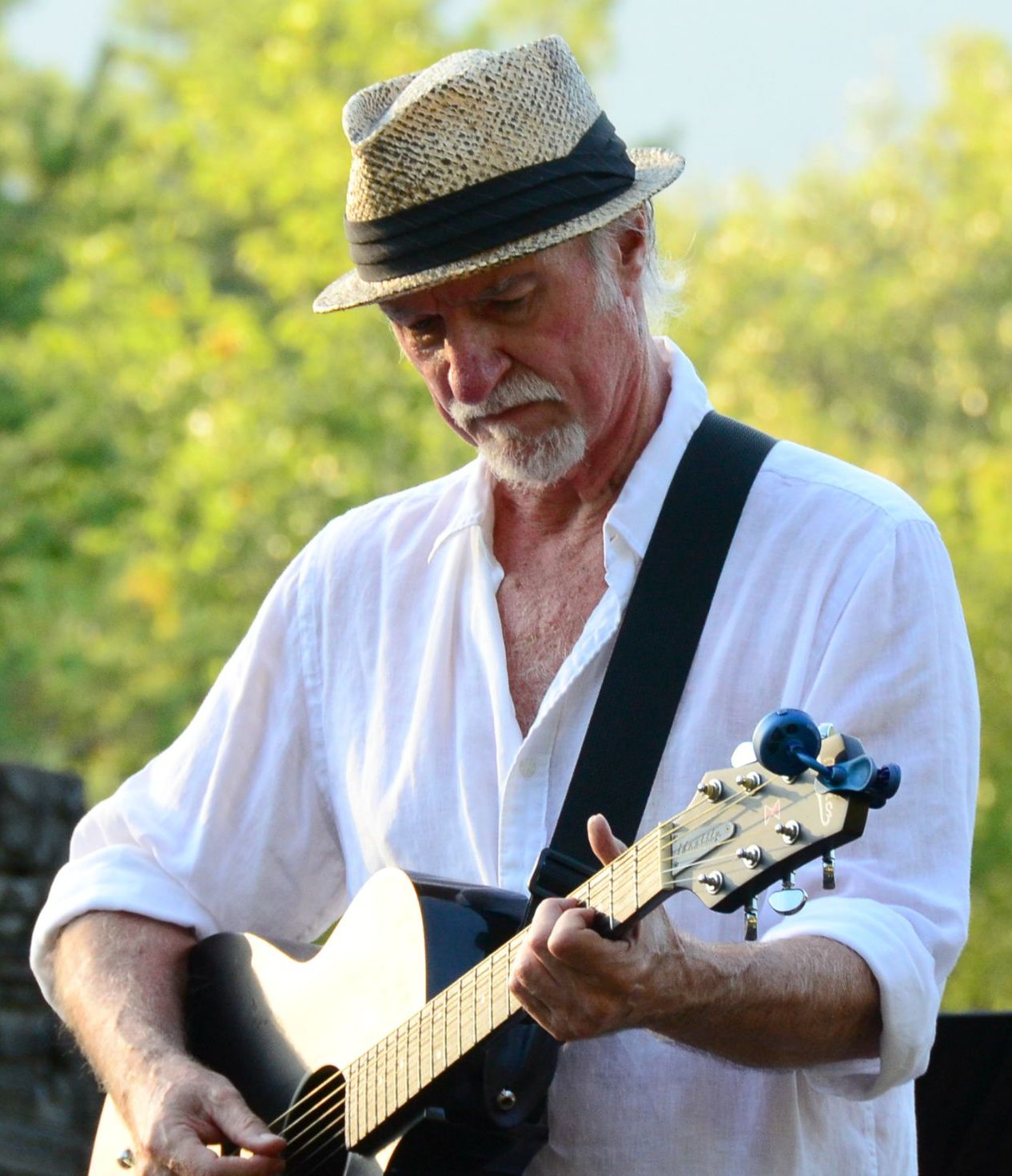
- Dupree in 2015

Background information
- Born: Robert Dupuis; December 23, 1946 (age 79); Brooklyn, New York, U.S.
- Genres: Pop rock, soft rock
- Occupation: Singer
- Instruments: Vocals, guitar, harmonica
- Years active: 1978–present
- Labels: Elektra, Beverly, Spectra
- Website: robbiedupree.com

Robert Dupuis (born December 23, 1946), known professionally as Robbie Dupree, is an American singer best known for his hit songs "Steal Away" (No. 6 on the Billboard Hot 100) and "Hot Rod Hearts" (No. 15).

== Early life ==
Robbie Dupree was born Robert Dupuis in Brooklyn, New York on December 23, 1946, the son of Robert, an auto mechanic, and Maureen, a housewife. While growing up in Queens, his biggest musical influences included R&B musicians Marvin Gaye and Sam Cooke.

== Career ==
In 1981, he received a Grammy nomination as Best New Artist, losing to Christopher Cross. Dupree's final single to make the Billboard chart, "Brooklyn Girls", peaked at No. 54 in June 1981.

In 1987, Dupree contributed the song "Girls in Cars" to Piledriver - The Wrestling Album 2, a collection of theme songs for World Wrestling Entertainment (then known as the World Wrestling Federation). The tag team Strike Force (Tito Santana and Rick Martel) used an instrumental version of "Girls in Cars" as their entrance music from 1987 to 1989.

In 2010, Dupree signed with Spectra Records and released the album Time and Tide featuring former E Street Band keyboards player David Sancious. On May 21, 2010, Dupree performed on Late Night with Jimmy Fallon as part of Jimmy's ongoing tribute to yacht rock, the smooth West Coast sound of the late 1970s and early 1980s.

In 2011, Dupree toured as part of the All Star Rock concert series. The tour featured John Cafferty, Orleans, David Pack (ex-Ambrosia), John Ford Coley, Jimmy Hall of Wet Willie, Joe Lynn Turner, and Joe Bouchard.

In 2012, Dupree released a new four song album of covers entitled Arc of a Romance.

In 2013, Dupree toured throughout the United States and Canada over the summer as part of the Sail Rock 2013 with Christopher Cross, Player, Gary Wright, Al Stewart, Orleans, Firefall, and John Ford Coley.

In the summer of 2018, he and John Ford Coley appeared on the Rock the Yacht 2018 tour alongside Ambrosia, Peter Beckett (of Player), and Stephen Bishop.

== Discography ==
=== Albums ===
- 1980: Robbie Dupree – US No. 51, AUS No. 83
- 1981: Street Corner Heroes – US No. 169
- 1989: Carried Away
- 1993: Walking on Water
- 1995: Smoke and Mirrors
- 1997: Vintage Volume 1 (compilation)
- 2001: Vintage Volume 2 (compilation)
- 2003: Robbie Dupree with David Sancious
- 2010: Time and Tide
- 2012: Arc of a Romance

=== Singles ===
- 1980: "Steal Away" – US No. 6, R&B #85; Canada No. 14, AUS No. 24
- 1980: "Hot Rod Hearts" – US No. 15, Canada No. 42, AUS No. 58
- 1980: "Nadie Mas"
- 1981: "Brooklyn Girls" – US No. 54
- 1981: "Saturday Night"
- 1981: "Are You Ready for Love"
- 1987: "Girls in Cars"
- 1988: "This Is Life"
- 1993: "Walking on Water"
- 1993: "Goodbye LA"
- 1995: "Smoke and Mirrors"
- 1997: "Make It Easy on Yourself"
- 1997: "Live All Night Long"
- 2007: "The Critics Are Never Kind"
- 2008: "Fly Away"
- 2010: "Lucky"
- 2011: "Satisfied"
