= Walter Egan =

American rock musician (born 1948)

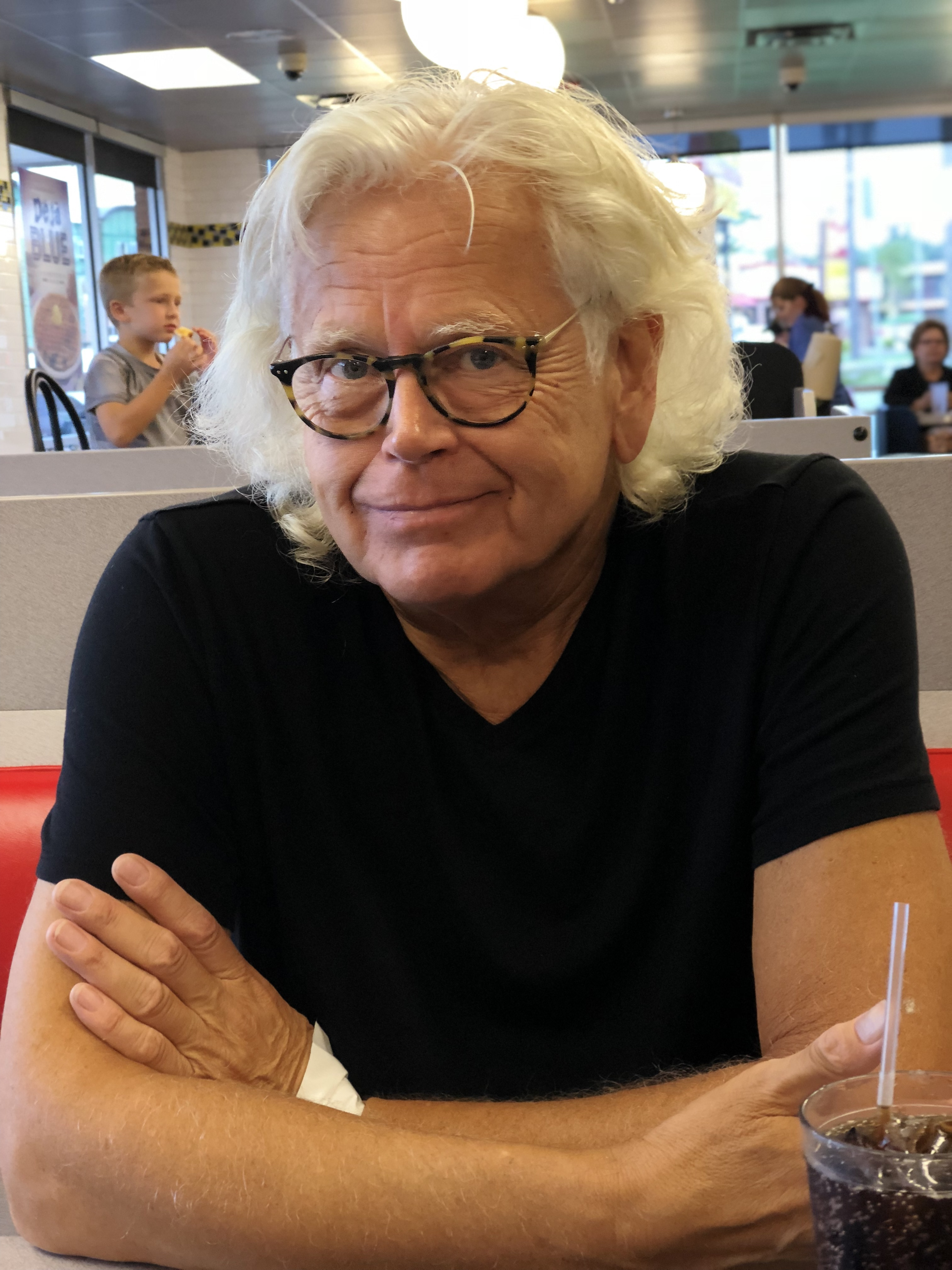
- Egan in 2025

Background information
- Born: Walter Lindsay Egan; July 12, 1948 (age 78); New York City, United States
- Genres: Soft rock, folk rock
- Occupations: Singer-songwriter, guitarist
- Instruments: Guitar, vocals, bass
- Years active: 1969–present
- Labels: Culture Factory; Razor & Tie; Columbia; Renaissance; Red Steel; Spectra
- Formerly of: Sageworth and Drums; The Burritos

Walter Lindsay Egan (born July 12, 1948) is an American rock musician, best known for his 1978 Gold-certified hit single "Magnet and Steel" from his second album release, Not Shy, produced by Egan, Lindsey Buckingham and Richard Dashut. The song reached No. 8 on the Billboard Hot 100 and No. 18 on the Easy Listening chart. In Canada it reached No. 9. Overseas, it peaked at No. 32 on the Australian Singles Chart, Kent Music Report.

== Early years and education ==
Egan was born in Queens, New York, United States. In 1970, as a sculpture major, he earned a Bachelor of Fine Arts degree at Georgetown University in Washington, D.C. as one of Georgetown's first art majors. Egan started his career in the arts, concentrating on printmaking and painting, and the music business. As early as 1965, Egan was playing guitar and composing songs with surf-rock group the Malibooz. While an undergraduate, he was a lead guitarist and backup vocalist for the college-formed group Sageworth and Drums, also known as Sageworth. The group evolved from a group of Georgetown University undergraduate students playing weekend mixers and parties to a tight, professional headlining act with a reputation as one of the best and most original bands in the greater Washington, D.C. area. Other members included Peter Barry Chowka, lead vocal and guitar; John Zambetti, guitar and backing vocals; John Borger, guitar and backing vocals; Tom Guidera, bass and backing vocals; and Matthew Sheppard, drums, with Annie McLoone added later as a lead singer.

In late 1971, Sageworth relocated to Boston and spent the next two years performing around the Northeast before finally breaking up, at which point Egan moved to Los Angeles and began his career as a solo artist.

== Career ==
=== Music ===
In 1977, Lindsey Buckingham of Fleetwood Mac co-produced Walter Egan's debut album, Fundamental Roll, with Stevie Nicks, also of Fleetwood Mac. The hit song, "Magnet and Steel", inspired by Nicks and from his second album Not Shy, was featured in the 1997 film Boogie Nights, the 1998 film Overnight Delivery, and the 1999 film Deuce Bigalow: Male Gigolo. Egan also wrote "Hearts on Fire", which was covered by Gram Parsons on his album Grievous Angel, and "Hot Summer Nights", which was the first hit for the band Night, and included such session musicians as Nicky Hopkins and Robbie McIntosh. Egan scored minor hits with his original version of "Hot Summer Nights" (No. 56 Can.), as well as "Only the Lucky" and "Fool Moon Fire".

In 1981, Egan appeared as one of several guitarists, bassists and drummers accompanying Lindsey Buckingham in the music video for his solo hit "Trouble." Egan is seen as the second guitarist, playing in a line up of musicians, along with Bob Welch and Mick Fleetwood.

Egan later toured as a member of a latter-day version of Spirit as bassist.

Egan is listed as co-writer on the Eminem hit "We Made You". The song's producer, Dr. Dre, believed he was inspired by the bass line from (and used samples of) Egan's "Hot Summer Nights".

In 2008, he participated in a music industry seminar (with Bill Danoff) at Georgetown University.

In 2011, from his home in Franklin, he produced a new album entitled ‘Raw Elegant’ that was released on Spectra Records and a duo of follow up albums in 2014 and 2017 called ‘Myth America’ and ‘True Songs’.

Egan also recorded and toured extensively in the nineties with The Brooklyn Cowboys and has contributed to their two albums and an EP to date.

2021 saw the release of ‘Fascination’, based on the real life adventures of infatuation, lust, love & love lost and Pamela Des Barres. This was followed up with 2023’s ‘Pluck!’ which included a cover of Fleetwood Mac’s ‘Dreams’.

A new album is under construction in 2024 for release in 2025 provisionally titled ‘Magnitude’ to accompany an autobiographical book of the same name.

Egan not only records and tours as a solo artist but also with his early band The Malibooz, contributing extensively to their latest studio effort ‘QE2’ which was released just as the global pandemic took hold in April 2020.

=== Game show appearances ===
In 1985, Egan was a four-time champion on the game show Catchphrase. In 1986, he appeared as a contestant on the television game show Scrabble. During his introduction segment, Egan identified himself as a singer and songwriter. Host Chuck Woolery asked Egan to sing a bit from one of his songs, and he sang the main hook from "Magnet and Steel". Egan later appeared in two episodes of the public radio quiz show Says You! in 2018 when the show taped in Nashville.

=== Recent and current projects ===
In 2018 and 2019 Egan, along with producer Rob Corich and UK label Red Steel Music started work on new projects that encompassed a series of enhanced remasters each with bonus tracks and each release accompanied by at least one digital two track single, of which the B-sides are often non album releases unavailable elsewhere.

Four back catalogue albums encompassing The Meaning of Live, Walternative, Apocolypso Now, and Mad Dog along with two new EP's Hot Summer Nights and Magnet and Steel have been released to date and more are under development for release in 2022.

During 2020's worldwide lockdown this team also produced Egan's studio album Fascination, which is based around the life and love of the world's most famous groupie, Pamela Des Barres.

Egan has recently completed a cover of the classic "Last Fair Deal Gone Down" for inclusion on a forthcoming tribute to Robert Johnson due for release in 2022.

He is currently working on a book covering his life story and it is likely this will be accompanied with a CD of songs relating to his rock and roll stories. He was rumoured to be working on a new studio release for late 2022 and this had been tentatively been titled 'Hard Summer Days' but has now appeared as 'Pluck!' The album was preceded by a two track single including "Dreams", which is Egan's interpretation of the Fleetwood Mac song.

== Discography ==
=== Albums ===
- Fundamental Roll (Columbia / Culture Factory, 1977)
- Not Shy (Columbia, 1978) - U.S. No. 44
- HiFi (Columbia, 1979) - U.S. No. 201
- The Last Stroll (Columbia, June 1980)
- Wild Exhibitions (MCA / Backstreet, 1983)
- The Mad Dog Sessions (recorded 1986 but not released until the new millennium on Red Steel)
- Walternative (We, 1999)
- Doin' Time On Planet Earth (as The Brooklyn Cowboys) ( Leap Records, 2000)
- The Lost Album (Renaissance, 2000)
- Mad Dog (Red Steel, RMCCD, 2001)
- Apocalypso Now (Gaff, 2002)
- Dodging Bullets (as The Brooklyn Cowboys) (Leap Records, 2002)
- The Other Man In Black (as The Brooklyn Cowboys) (Leap Records, 2003)
- The Meaning of Live (Red Steel, RMCCD, 2004)
- Raw Elegant (Spectra, 2011)
- Myth America (Classic Music Vault, 2014)
- True Songs (WE Music, 2017)
- Sound as Ever (as The Burritos, 2018)
- Magnet and Steel EP (Red Steel, RMCDE9261, 2019)
- Hot Summer Nights EP (Red Steel, RMCDE9260, 2019)
- Mad Dog (Redux Remaster) (Red Steel, RMCDA9263, 2020)
- The Meaning of Live (Redux Remaster) (Red Steel, RMCDA9259, 2020)
- Apocalypso Now (Redux Remaster) (Red Steel, RMCDA9272, 2020)
- Walternative (Redux Remaster) (Red Steel, RMCDA9274, 2021)
- Fascination (Red Steel, RMCCD9269 & RMCDA9263, 2021)
- Pluck! (Red Steel, RMCCD9295 & RMCDA9296, 2023)
- Cleveland Rocks - Live (Red Steel, RMCDA, scheduled early 2025)

=== Singles ===
- "Only the Lucky"/"I'd Rather Have Fun" (Columbia 10531, 1977) - U.S. No. 82
- "When I Get My Wheels"/"Waitin'" (Columbia 10591, 1977)
- "Magnet and Steel"/"Tunnel O' Love" (Columbia 10719, 1978) - U.S. No. 8
- "Hot Summer Nights"/"She's So Tough" (Columbia 10824, 1978) - U.S. No. 55, CA RPM Singles No. 56, ARG No. 1
- "Magnet and Steel"/"Only the Lucky" (Columbia Hall of Fame 33353, 1979)
- "Unloved"/"Make It Alone" (Columbia 10916, 1979)
- "You're the One"/"Like You Do" (Columbia 11046, 1979)
- "That's That"/"Hi Fi Love" (Columbia 11116, 1979)
- "Baby Let's Runaway"/"Johnny Z (Is a Real Cool Guy)" (Columbia 11297, 1980)
- "Fool Moon Fire"/"Tammy Ann" (Backstreet 52200, 1983) - U.S. No. 46
- "Star of My Heart"/"Joyce" (Backstreet 52249, 1983)
- "Magnet and Steel"/"Only the Lucky" (Collectables 33353)
- "Only Love Is Left Alive"/"Jean" (Red Steel, RMCDS9262, 2020) - First single from the Mad Dog (Redux Remaster) album.
- "Miss Pamela"/"Treat Me Nice" (Red Steel, RMCDS9265, 2020) - First single and video from the Fascination album.
- "I’m With The Girl"/"Love Me Tonight" (Red Steel, RMCDS9267, 2020) - Second single and video from the Fascination album. Non album B-side.
- "Stubborn Girl"/"Stubborn Boy" (Red Steel, RMCDS9273, 2020) - Single from the Apocolypso Now (Redux Remaster) album. Non album B-side
- "The Loneliest Boy"/"I’ve Had It" (Red Steel, RMCDS9264, 2020) - Second single from the Mad Dog (Redux Remaster) album. Non album B-side.
- "Bad News Travels Fast"/"In My Room" (Red Steel, RMCDS9277, 2020) - Single from The Meaning Of Live (Redux Remaster) album. Non album B-side.
- "Beats The Devil"/"Not Another Lonely Night" (Red Steel, RMCDS9275, 2021) - single from the Walternative (Redux Remaster) album. Non album B-side.
- "Yesterday, Forever & Today"/"Forever ‘Til The End" (Red Steel, RMCDS9268, 2021) - Third single and video from the Fascination album. Non album B-side.
- "Old Photographs"/"Love In The Time Of War" (Red Steel, RMCDS9276, 2021) - Standalone single and video. Non album B-side.
- "Dreams"/"Free” (Red Steel, RMCDS9297 - June 2022) - First single from the ‘Pluck!’ studio album. Non album B-side. Single accompanied by a video.
- "Glad To Be Alive"/"Ache" (Red Steel, RMCDS92, 2023) - Second single from the Pluck! album. Non album B-side
- "Woman Deluxe"/"Lobster" (Red Steel, RMCDS92, 2023) - Third single from the Pluck! album. Non album B-side
- ”Hard Summer Days”/“Man In Love (Red Steel, RMCDS92, 2024) - Forth single from the Pluck! album. With a non album B-side

== See also ==
- List of 1970s one-hit wonders in the United States
