= Peter Beckett =

English musician and songwriter

- Born: 10 August 1948 (age 78); Aigburth, Liverpool, England
- Genres: Rock, pop, soft rock
- Occupations: Musician, singer, songwriter
- Instruments: Vocals, guitar
- Years active: 1965–present
- Formerly of: Player, Think Out Loud, Little River Band
- Website: www.peterbeckett-player.com

Peter Beckett (born 10 August 1948) is an English musician and songwriter who has written songs for recording artists, his own bands, solo work, and films. He is the lead singer and guitarist for 1970s soft rock band Player, which scored a U.S. number one hit in 1977 with "Baby Come Back".

== Early life ==
Beckett was born in the Aigburth district of Liverpool, England on 10 August 1948. He was influenced by seeing the Beatles perform at the famous Cavern Club.

== Career ==
At 16, he recorded his first record, "All Night Stand", with a band called the Thoughts. "All Night Stand" was written by Ray Davies from the Kinks. He then joined a band called Winston G and the Wicked, later renamed 'Whip'. After they disbanded, Beckett auditioned for Badfinger on the heels of "Come and Get It", and was on Peter Ham's and Tommy Evans' short list, but they ultimately offered the job to Joey Molland. Beckett then joined a progressive rock band called Paladin, recording two albums, Paladin and Paladin Charge!.

Beckett moved to Los Angeles, California in 1974 and performed with 'Skyband' before joining up with JC Crowley, Ronn Moss, and John Friesen in 1976 to form Player. Player enjoyed a number one hit in 1978 with "Baby Come Back" – written by Beckett and JC Crowley.

After recording four albums, Player split up and Beckett began writing songs for other recording artists such as Janet Jackson, Olivia Newton-John, The Temptations and Kenny Rogers and for films and television during the 1980s.

During the years 1982–88, Beckett joined with Steve Kipner and concentrated on songwriting for other major artists. In the late 1980s, the two formed Think Out Loud, releasing the eponymous Think Out Loud album in 1988 on A&M Records. Nearly ten years later, the two produced a follow-up Think Out Loud album Shelf Life, released on MTM Records in 1997. Beckett joined up with the Little River Band in 1989 and toured with them for over eight years.

In 1991, Beckett released his first solo album, Beckett. Getting back together with Ronn Moss in 1995, they recorded Player's fifth album, Lost in Reality and toured the United States. Since then, Beckett has produced, written and played on two solo albums for Ronn Moss and composed music for the soap opera The Bold and the Beautiful, which starred Moss. Beckett and Moss had a world tour in 2006 which included some dates in the United States. Beckett is also working on a second solo album and continues to write film scores and material for other artists.

In 2013, Player released Too Many Reasons on Frontiers Records. Beckett and Moss joined the Sail Rock Tour 2013 with Christopher Cross, Gary Wright, Al Stewart, Orleans, Firefall, Robbie Dupree and John Ford Coley, performing all over the United States and Canada. In 2015, they joined the Rock The Yacht tour with Ambrosia, Robbie Dupree, Stephen Bishop and Little River Band. They also perform annually with The Yacht Rock Revue. Beckett is currently working on a country CD, Peter Beckett – Limey Cowboy and since September 2017 continues to tour with his band Peter Beckett's Player.

== Discography ==
=== Studio albums ===
- Beckett (1991)

=== with Player ===
- Player (1977)
- Danger Zone (1978)
- Room with a View (1980)
- Spies of Life (1981)
- Electric Shadow (Japan) / Lost in Reality (US) (1995/1996)
- Too Many Reasons (2013)

=== with Think Out Loud ===
- Think Out Loud (1988)
- Shelf Life (1997)

=== with Ronn Moss ===
- I'm Your Man (2000)
- Uncovered (2005)

=== Soundtrack appearances ===
- "Jenny" (from Where the Boys Are '84) (1984)
- "How Can the Girl Refuse" (from Major League) (1989)
- "Until You Let Go" with Jeanette Clinger (from Frankie and Johnny) (1991)

=== Guest appearances ===
- "Stripe!" with Noriyuki Makihara (from Songs From N.Y.) (2007)
