= J. C. Crowley =

American musician

- Born: John Charles Crowley; November 13, 1947 (age 78)
- Origin: Houston, Texas
- Genres: Rock, country
- Occupation: Singer-songwriter
- Instruments: Vocals, guitar, keyboards
- Years active: 1977–early 1990s
- Label: RCA
- Formerly of: Player

John Charles Crowley (born November 13, 1947) is an American musician. In his career, he has been a member of the band Player, has recorded one studio album "Beneath the Texas Moon" RCA Records 8370-2-R 1988 and charted several singles on the Billboard country charts.

== Career ==
In 1977, Crowley co-founded the rock band Player, and co-wrote their song "Baby Come Back". He also shared the vocals on both albums, Player and Danger Zone, playing keyboard and guitar and singing on the album. Crowley left Player after their second LP.

He continued as a successful songwriter, signing with RCA Records. His biggest success was a song he had written and performed himself called "Paint the Town and Hang the Moon Tonight" in 1988, which was from his only solo LP, Beneath the Texas Moon. The album and singles' success helped Crowley received a nomination for Best New Male Vocalist of the Year by the Academy of Country Music Awards. The title song from Crowley's album also appeared on the soundtrack of Clint Eastwood's film Pink Cadillac.

Through the 80's and 90's, his songs were recorded by Johnny Cash, Smokey Robinson, Little River Band, the Oak Ridge Boys, and many more.

Crowley survived a bout of cancer between 1994 and 1999. He lives in Topanga, California.

== Discography ==
=== Albums ===
Title	Details
Beneath the Texas Moon	Release date: 1988; Label: RCA Records

=== Singles ===
Year	Single	Peak chart positions		Album
Year	Single	US Country	CAN Country	Album
1988	"Boxcar 109"	49	—	Beneath the Texas Moon
1988	"Paint the Town and Hang the Moon Tonight"	13	8	Beneath the Texas Moon
1989	"I Know What I've Got"	21	12	Beneath the Texas Moon
1989	"Beneath the Texas Moon"	55	66	Beneath the Texas Moon / Pink Cadillac soundtrack
"—" denotes releases that did not chart

=== Music videos ===
Year	Video	Director
1988	"Paint the Town and Hang the Moon Tonight"	Sherman Halsey
1989	"Beneath the Texas Moon"	Michael Salomon

== Awards and nominations ==
Year	Organization	Award	Nominee/Work	Result
1989	Academy of Country Music Awards	Top New Male Vocalist	J.C. Crowley	Nominated
