= Yacht rock =

Neologism for 1970s–1980s soft rock music style

- Other names: West Coast sound; adult-oriented rock
- Stylistic origins: Soft rock; pop rock; blue-eyed soul; soul; jazz fusion; smooth jazz; disco; R&B; funk
- Cultural origins: Mid-1970s – mid-1980s
- Derivative forms: Chillwave; vaporwave

Other topics
- Adult contemporary music; city pop; Pop kreatif

Yacht rock (originally known as the West Coast sound or adult-oriented rock) is a broad music style and aesthetic commonly associated with soft rock, one of the most commercially successful genres from the mid-1970s to the mid-1980s. Drawing on sources such as smooth soul, smooth jazz, R&B, and disco, common stylistic traits include high-quality production, clean vocals, and a focus on light, catchy melodies. The term yacht rock was coined in 2005 by the makers of the online comedy video series Yacht Rock, who connected the music with the popular Southern Californian leisure activity of boating. It was considered a pejorative term by some music critics.

== Definition ==
The term yacht rock did not exist contemporaneously with the music the term describes, which was produced from 1975 to 1984. It refers to "adult-oriented rock" or the "West Coast Sound", which became identified with yacht rock in 2005, when the term was coined in J. D. Ryznar et al.'s online video series of the same name. Many "yacht rockers" included nautical references in their lyrics, videos, and album artwork, exemplified by Christopher Cross's anthemic track, "Sailing" (1979). Long mocked for "its saccharine sincerity and garish fashion", the original stigma attached to the music has lessened since about 2015.

In 2014, AllMusic's Matt Colier identified the "key defining rules of the genre:"

- "keep it smooth, even when it grooves, with more emphasis on the melody than on the beat"
- "keep the emotions light, even when the sentiment turns sad (as is so often the case in the world of the sensitive yacht-rocksman)"
- "always keep it catchy, no matter how modest or deeply buried in the tracklist the tune happens to be"

The "exhilaration of escape" is "essential to yacht", according to journalist and documentary filmmaker Katie Puckrik. She quoted the lyrics of Cross's "Ride Like the Wind" (1979), "to make it to the border of Mexico", as an example of the aspirational longing that demonstrates "the power of the genre". Thwarted desire is another key element that counters the "feelgood bounce" of yacht in the same song. Puckrik identified a sub-genre, "dark yacht", exemplified in Joni Mitchell's "accidental yacht rock" song "The Hissing of Summer Lawns" (1975), which described the "tarnished love" of "a woman trapped in a big house and a loveless marriage".

According to Mara Schwartz Kuge, who worked in the L.A. music industry for two decades, "Soft rock was a genre of very popular pop music from the 1970s and early 1980s, characterized by soft, mostly acoustic guitars and slow-to-mid tempos ... most people have generalized the term to mean anything kind of soft-and-1970s-ish, including artists like Rupert Holmes. Not all yacht rock is soft, either: Toto's 'Hold the Line' and Kenny Loggins' 'Footloose' are both very yacht rock but not soft rock."

Comprehensively defining yacht rock remains difficult, despite agreement that its central elements are "aspirational but not luxurious, jaunty but lonely, pained but polished". Journalist Jack Seale stated that, as in other "micro-genres", certain albums of artists who are accepted as proponents are "arbitrarily ruled in or out". For example, Michael Jackson's Thriller (1982) is accepted as yacht rock, but Fleetwood Mac's Rumours (1977) is not.

=== Yacht Rock creators ===
Yacht Rock web series co-creators Ryznar, Steve Huey, Hunter Stair, and David Lyons have attempted to apply precision to what is defined as yacht rock, and have been critical of overly expansive definitions of the term. In 2016, they invented the term "nyacht rock" to refer to songs that have sometimes been classified as yacht rock but that they felt did not fit the definition. On their podcasts Beyond Yacht Rock and Yacht or Nyacht?, they have categorized various songs as being either within or outside of the genre.

Factors that the four list as relevant to yacht rock include:

- High production value
- Use of "elite" Los Angeles–based studio musicians and producers associated with yacht rock
- Jazz and R&B influences
- Use of electric piano
- Complex and wry lyrics about heartbroken, foolish men, particularly involving the word "fool"
- An upbeat rhythm called the "Doobie Bounce"

Ryznar and company have argued that many artists sometimes associated with yacht rock, particularly the folk-driven soft rock of Gordon Lightfoot and Eagles, fall outside the scope of the term as originally conceived. They have also disputed the use of the term as an umbrella for any song whose lyrics include nautical references, opting for the term "marina rock" for bands close to the scene but lacking a few elements, such as Rupert Holmes and Hall & Oates. The term's inventors consider Michael McDonald the most influential yacht rock artist.

== Origins ==
The socio-political and economic changes that contributed to the emergence of the genre have recently been described by journalists like Steven Orlofsky, and by documentary-film maker Katie Puckrik. Orlofsky pointed out that some contemporaneous pop groups such as Fleetwood Mac, Steely Dan, and Supertramp were well-respected by critics and listeners. Yacht rock was art "untouched by the outside world". By contrast to what followed, it "was probably the last major era of pop music wholly separated from the politics of its day". Yacht rock represented an "introspective individualism" that emerged after the death of the "mass-movement idealism" of the 1960s. Its "reassuringly vague escapism" was boosted by the rise of FM radio which brought together two consequences of gender emancipation: women who controlled household spending and men who "felt freer to convey their emotions in song".

The roots of yacht rock can be traced to the music of the Beach Boys, whose aesthetic was the first to be "scavenged" by acts like Rupert Holmes, according to Jacobin's Dan O'Sullivan. Captain & Tennille, who were members of the Beach Boys' live band, won a Best Record Grammy in 1975, for "Love Will Keep Us Together", a song that composer Neil Sedaka acknowledged was inspired in part by a Beach Boys riff. O'Sullivan also cites the Beach Boys recording of "Sloop John B" (1966) as the origin of yacht rock's predilection for the "sailors and beachgoers" aesthetic that was "lifted by everyone, from Christopher Cross to Eric Carmen, from 'Buffalo Springfield' folksters like Jim Messina to 'Philly Sound' rockers like Hall & Oates".

Some of the most popular yacht rock acts (who also collaborated on each other's records) included Michael McDonald, Christopher Cross, Kenny Loggins, Steely Dan, and Toto.

== Resurgence ==
Around 2016, positive reappraisals of the genre began to appear in The Guardian, The Week, and on BBC Four, which broadcast Puckrik's two-part documentary, I Can Go for That: The Smooth World of Yacht Rock, in June 2019. (That documentary is a play on the 1981 Hall & Oates song "I Can't Go for That (No Can Do)".)

Orlofsky has argued that the genre's resurgence is partly due to its function as an antidote to the negativity of the Trump era in the US just as in its original context, when yacht rock created "the perfect soundtrack for listeners trying to ignore Watergate and Vietnam", it now again represents "a defiant, fingers-planted-firmly-within-ears disregard of any and all political unrest".

New yacht rock bands have formed to cater to fans. Among the bands are Young Gun Silver Fox from London, Yacht Rock Revue from Atlanta, and Yachtley Crew from Los Angeles.

=== Radio format ===
The yacht rock radio format can be found on both terrestrial radio and satellite radio stations. SiriusXM offers a yacht rock channel seasonally to subscribers; the company also streams the channel year-round via their Sirius XM mobile application. iHeartRadio also has a dedicated "Yacht Rock Radio" station that airs this format 24/7 on its website and app.

The format has also been adopted by several commercial radio stations, either as a variant of soft adult contemporary, or as a standalone format. Self proclaimed yacht rock stations include WKEY-FM in the Florida Keys, WWMK in Northern Michigan, WINX-FM, KZOT 1180 AM, Omaha, NE, and WTWV-FM in Virginia Beach. Pacific Coast Highway Radio is an online yacht rock station broadcasting to the United Kingdom.

== Reception and legacy ==
=== Perspectives ===
A 2012 Jacobin article described yacht rock as "endlessly banal, melodic and inoffensive, fit to be piped into Macy's changing rooms". The article describes the popularity of yacht rock as reflective of a regressive Reagan-era American society and "about the garden of nightmares America had become". According to the Jacobin article, yacht rock served as "an escape from blunt truths" about sociopolitical issues of the day. In an article in The New Inquiry, music scholar J. Temperance stated that yacht rock "sterilized the form of its soul and blues elements and instead emphasized disinterested, intentionally trite lyrical themes". In a uDiscovermusic article, Paul Sexton expressed how yacht rock as a genre seemed to "exude privileged opulence: of days in expensive recording studios followed by hedonistic trips on private yachts". According to writer Max McKenna in a 2018 Popmatters article, the lack of political messaging in the yacht rock genre is a "conservative gesture(s) flying under the radar in a climate of poptimist reappraisal".

In response to the Jacobin article, music scholar J. Temperance wrote in The New Inquiry that, rather than being a reactionary genre, yacht rock was essential to the growth of pop music in a time of "cultural darkness", "serving as a dialectical pole to progressive rock as well as to punk, postpunk and even proto-postpunk, spurring drastic retrenchments". J. Temperance attributed the "smooth" sound that is characteristic of yacht rock to an indifferent approach to capitalist culture and a "regressive tolerance of allegedly transgressive music with a truly liberatory anality" by using existing symbols rather than create new anti-establishment symbols that are eventually added into the establishment symbols. The New Inquiry article describes the role of yacht rock as a genre that would help people differentiate music appreciation from status by using common symbols and "rendering the popular into the smooth".

Yacht rock had also faced racial criticism, given the genre's associations with "the revival of white rock forms" as writer Max McKenna stated in the 2018 Popmatters article. In a New York Times op-ed piece Wesley Morris compares the recognition given to black artists and white artists who possess the "absurd" quality of blackness in their music. Due to its perceived lack of political involvement and borrowed elements from black music genres, yacht rock has garnered the perception of racial ignorance amongst certain critics of the genre. The Jacobin article described Michael McDonald, a musician well known within the genre of yacht rock, as a "bleached, blue-eyed soul cracker".

Yacht rock is listed as a genre on Spotify, Amazon Music, AccuRadio, and Pandora. Since 2015, there has been a "Yacht Rock" channel alongside one for "Yacht Soul" on Sirius XM Satellite Radio. The channel reverts to the off-season channel after summer, but is available year-round on the SXM app.

In 2018, Jawbone Press released The Yacht Rock Book: The Oral History of the Soft, Smooth Sounds of the 70s and 80s by author Greg Prato, which explored the entire genre's history. The book featured a foreword by Fred Armisen (who would later spoof the genre on an episode of the Emmy Award-nominated mockumentary series Documentary Now with Bill Hader as the fictional band known as The Blue Jean Committee and released the album of the same name), and interviews with Christopher Cross, Kenny Loggins, and John Oates, among others.

In 2024, HBO Max released Yacht Rock: A Dockumentary, directed by Garrett Price. The documentary received a cumulative 91% rating on Rotten Tomatoes. Rick Beato, a music producer and Youtube educator, said, "I find that term, yacht rock, completely offensive." Beato argues that the genre and the documentary try to group artists with very different styles.

== See also ==
- List of yacht rock artists
- Culture of California
