= Gary Puckett =

American singer (born 1942)

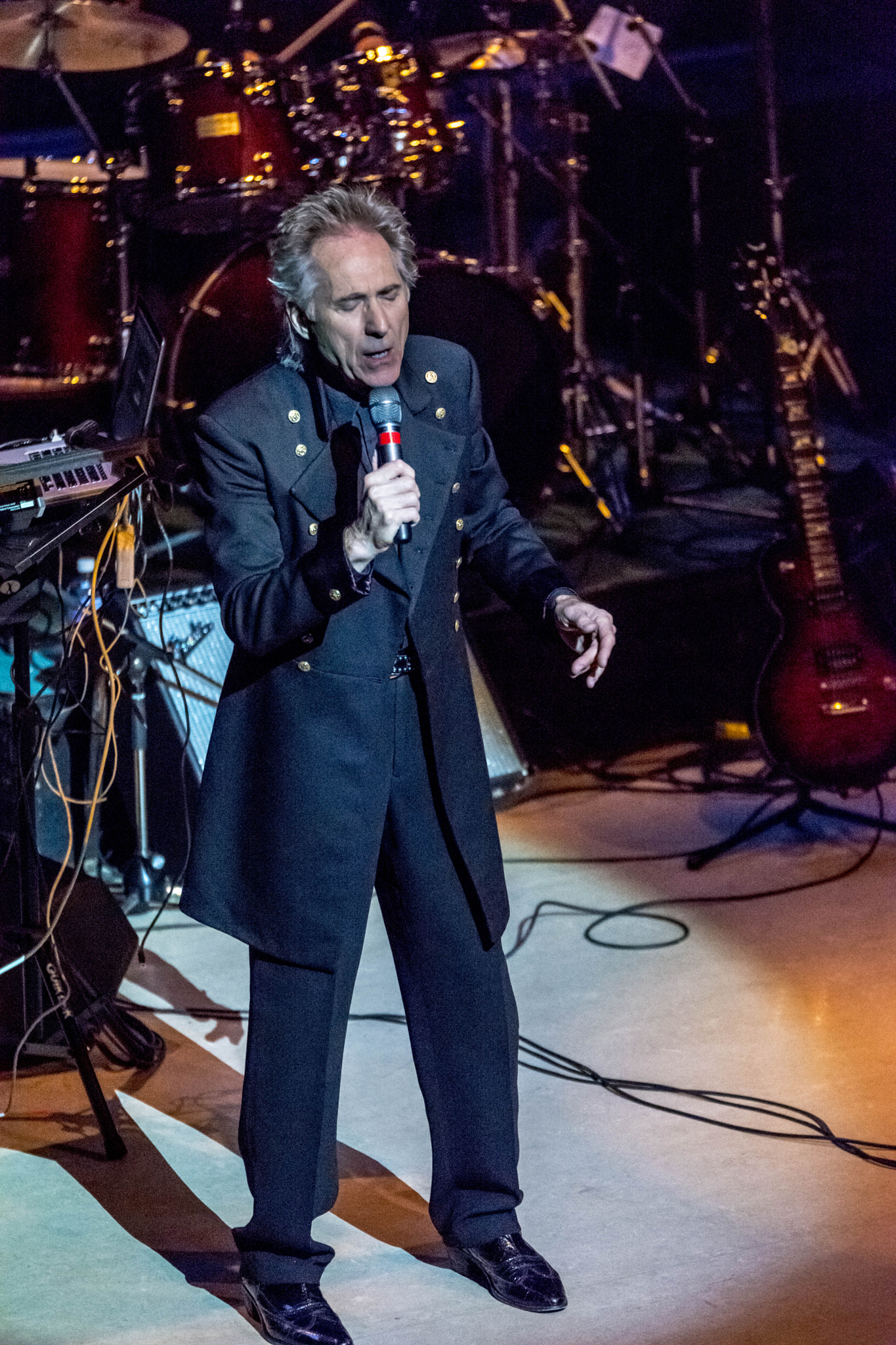
- Puckett performing in 2016

Background information
- Born: Gary Dale Puckett; October 17, 1942 (age 83); Hibbing, Minnesota, U.S.
- Origin: San Diego, California, U.S.
- Genres: Pop
- Occupations: Singer; songwriter
- Instruments: Vocals; guitar; piano
- Years active: 1964–present
- Labels: Columbia; Sony; Juslor; Orchard
- Formerly of: Gary Puckett & The Union Gap
- Spouse: Lorrie Haimes (m. 2000)
- Website: garypuckettmusic.com

Gary Dale Puckett (born October 17, 1942) is an American singer widely known as the lead vocalist for Gary Puckett & The Union Gap, who had six consecutive gold records in 1968, including "Woman Woman", "Young Girl", "Lady Willpower", "Over You", "Don't Give In to Him" and "This Girl Is a Woman Now."

After the Union Gap disbanded in 1971, Puckett signed to Columbia and embarked on a solo career. After a decade-long hiatus starting in 1972, he returned to music in the early 1980s, and has since released a handful of studio albums.

== Early life and education ==
Puckett was born in Hibbing, Minnesota. When he was six, his family moved to Yakima, Washington (not far from Union Gap, Washington), where he grew up. Puckett learned how to sing and play guitar during his teens.

He went to college for two years in San Diego, California, majoring in psychology, then dropped out to work in a band called the Outcasts.

== The Outcasts ==
Gary's first group was The Outcasts, which included Bobby Brown (bass), Dwight Bement (saxophone; also later member of the Union Gap), Bob Salisbury (saxophone), and Willie Kellogg (drums). Originally formed as a Righteous Brothers-styled duo by Puckett and Brown, their manager Yale Kahn, owner of the Clairemont Bowl, added Bement, Salisbury, and Kellogg to the lineup.

After releasing two singles, "Run Away / Would You Care" (1965) and "I Can't Get Through To You / I Found Out About You" (1966), the group split up in 1967.

== Gary Puckett & The Union Gap ==
=== Formation ===
In January 1967, Puckett and Dwight Bement formed Gary and the Remarkables with Kerry Chater (August 7, 1945 – February 4, 2022, bass), Gary 'Mutha' Withem (born August 22, 1944, keyboards), and Paul Wheatbread (February 8, 1946 – July 6, 2026, drums). The break came for the group when Jerry Fuller, a former country music artist and a producer for Columbia Records in Los Angeles, heard them at a small bar where they were performing in a bowling alley complex. Fuller liked their sound and signed them to a contract.

=== Initial success ===
They were now going under the name Gary Puckett & The Union Gap and would be known for hits such as "Lady Willpower", "Young Girl" and "Woman, Woman". They sold more records in 1968 than any other group and had six consecutive gold records as well as making two appearances on The Ed Sullivan Show (1968, 1971). Their song "Woman, Woman" was an adaptation of the country hit by the Glaser Brothers called "Girl, Girl". On records, they wore Civil War outfits, as suggested by Puckett, and called themselves the Union Gap after the Union Gap area where Puckett had lived.

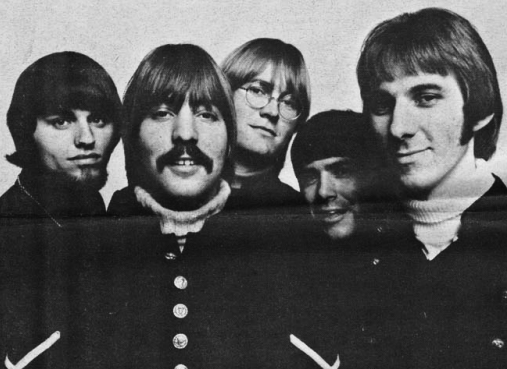
Puckett (far right) with the Union Gap in 1968.

The band was nominated for a Grammy Award for Best New Artist in 1969, losing out to José Feliciano.

=== Split and reformation ===
The group eventually grew unhappy with doing material written and produced by others, leading them to stop working with Fuller, and they disbanded in 1971.

Gary re-formed the band sometime in the early 1980s and, since signing to them in 1984, has performed with them at the yearly "Happy Together" tours, alongside Howard Kaylan and Mark Volman of The Turtles (who started up the tour), The Association, The Cowsills, Ron Dante of The Archies, Chuck Negron of Three Dog Night, The Buckinghams, The Box Tops, The Vogues, and The Classics IV.

As of around 2012, their current line-up consists of Puckett, Woody Lingle (bass), Jamie Hilboldt (keyboards), and Mike Candito (drums).

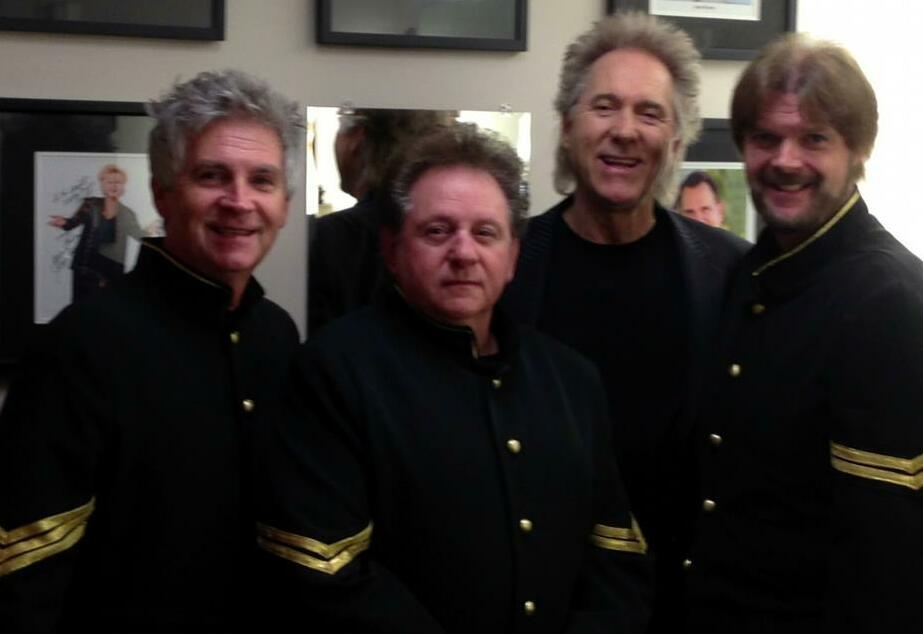
Puckett (2nd from right) with the Union Gap in 2012

The Union Gap's "Greatest Hits" album was one of CBS' best selling "Collector Series" albums.

In 1974 "Young Girl" was reissued in the UK where it reached number five and achieved a Silver Record Award for the second time.

== Solo career ==
After the Union Gap split, Puckett released a solo album titled The Gary Puckett Album that same year.

He released a few singles from 1970 to 1972, with his first two being a cover of Dusty Springfield's 1964 song, "I Just Don't Know What to Do with Myself" and a cover of Simon & Garfunkel's "Keep The Customer Satisfied" (a song Puckett performed on The Ed Sullivan Show in January 1971).

After the release of his 1971 album, Puckett's contract was terminated.

He lived a private life throughout the rest of the 1970s, studying acting and dance and working in theatrical productions in and around Los Angeles, before he made a comeback in the music industry as a solo artist in the 1980s.

Puckett was on the bill for the first Monkees reunion tour in 1986, along with the Grass Roots and Herman's Hermits.

After a decade out of the public eye, Puckett released Melodie (1982) followed by Love Me Tonight (1992), As It Stands (1995), Time Pieces (1996), and Is This Love (1997), as well as a Christmas album in 2001. Puckett's latest album is This Is Love (2006).

Puckett, along with Michael McDonald, joined Ringo Starr & His All-Starr Band in San Diego as a guest to sing the Beatles song "With a Little Help from My Friends" on June 26, 2000.

He was interviewed by Studio 10 in 2019.

Puckett opened a Cameo account in 2021.

== Personal life ==
Gary Puckett currently lives in Clearwater, Florida with his family. Since 1990, Puckett has been a born-again Christian, after having followed the teachings of Maharishi Mahesh Yogi.

== Discography ==
=== The Outcasts ===
==== Singles ====
- "Run Away" / "Would You Care" — 1965
- "I Can't Get Through To You" / "I Found Out About You" — 1966

=== With Gary Puckett & The Union Gap ===
==== Singles ====
Year	(A-Side) (Songwriters)	B-Side (Songwriters)	Chart Positions			
Year	(A-Side) (Songwriters)	B-Side (Songwriters)	US	US AC	UK	AU
November 1967 †	"Woman, Woman" (Jim Glaser, Jimmy Payne)	"Don't Make Promises" (Tim Hardin)	4	-	48	6
March 1968 †	"Young Girl" (Jerry Fuller)	"I'm Losing You" (Jerry Fuller, Gary Puckett)	2	34	1	2
June 1968 ‡	"Lady Willpower" (Jerry Fuller)	"Daylight Stranger" (Jerry Fuller, Gary Puckett)	2	26	5	4
September 1968 ‡	"Over You" (Jerry Fuller)	"If The Day Would Come" (Kerry Chater, Gary Puckett, Gary Withem)	7	3	54 (Note: Chart position is from the official UK "Breakers List".)	8
March 1969 ‡	"Don't Give In to Him" (Gary Usher)	"Could I" (Jerry Fuller, Gary Puckett)	15	13	-	24
August 1969 ‡	"This Girl Is a Woman Now" (Victor Millrose, Alan Bernstein)	"His Other Woman" (D. Allen, Kerry Chater)	9	2	-	16
March 1970 ‡	"Let's Give Adam and Eve Another Chance" (Richard Mainegra, Red West)	"The Beggar" (E. Colville, Gary Puckett)	41	16	-	-

Re-releases

Year	Single	Chart Position
Year	Single	UK
June 1974 ‡	"Young Girl" (CBS UK re-release)	6

==== Albums ====
Month and Year	Album title	U.S. Pop Albums	AUS
February 1968 †	Woman, Woman	22	-
May 1968 ‡	Gary Puckett & The Union Gap Featuring "Young Girl"	21	-
November 1968 ‡	Incredible	20	-
December 1969 ‡	The New Gary Puckett and the Union Gap Album	50	-
July 1970 ‡	Gary Puckett & The Union Gap's Greatest Hits	50	-
1981 ‡	The Best of Gary Puckett & The Union Gap	-	32

† – Billed as The Union Gap featuring Gary Puckett

‡ – Billed as Gary Puckett & The Union Gap

=== Solo ===
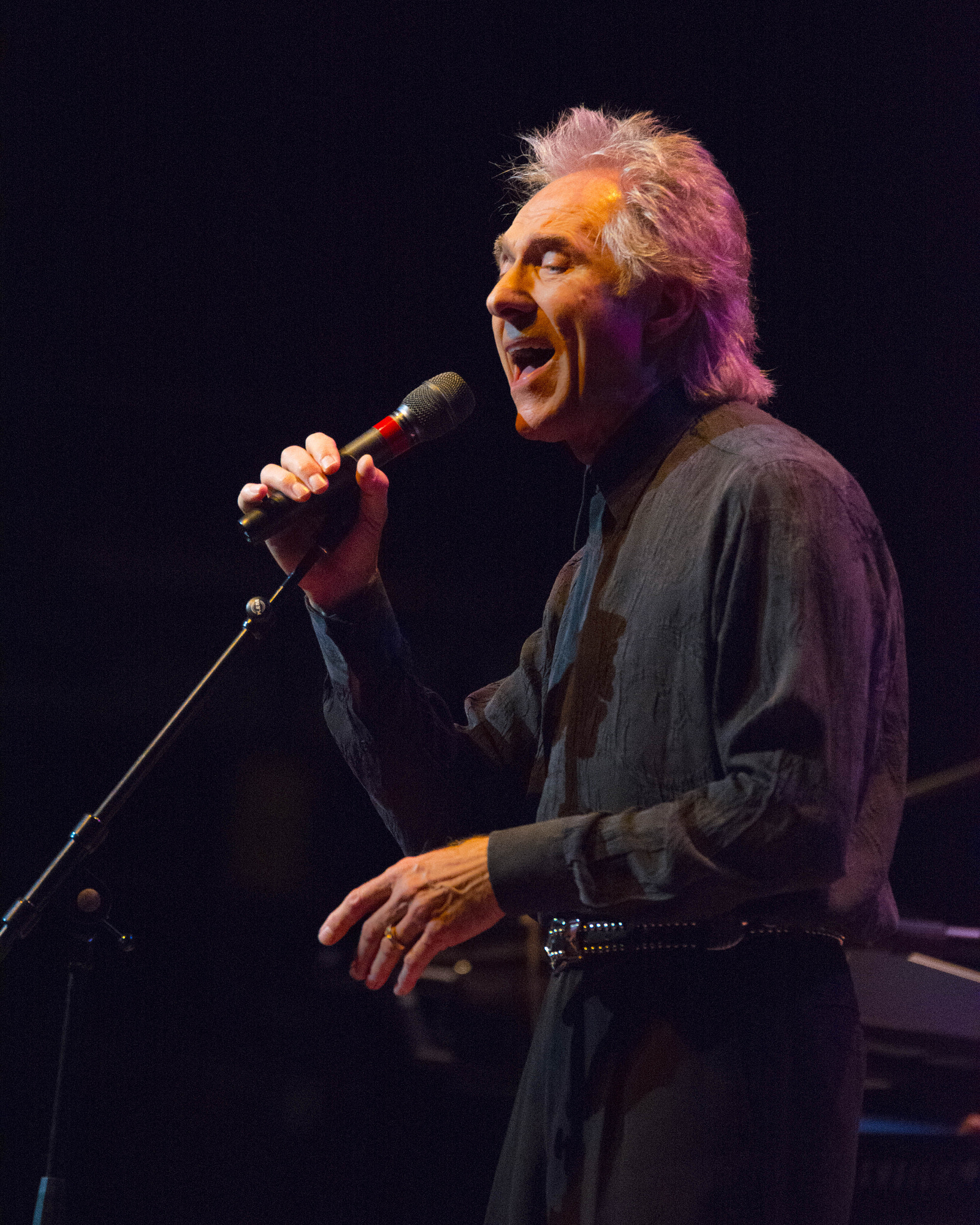
Puckett performing at the Rebecca Cohn Auditorium in Halifax on May 11, 2016

==== Singles ====
- "I Just Don't Know What to Do with Myself" (US Billboard No. 61, US AC No. 14) / "All That Matters" – Columbia 45249 – October 1970
- "Keep the Customer Satisfied" (US Billboard No. 71, US AC No. 28) / "No One Really Knows" – Columbia 45303 – February 1971
- "Life Has Its Little Ups and Downs" (US AC No. 24) / "Shimmering Eyes" – Columbia 45358 – 1971
- "Gentle Woman" (US Record World No. 109) / "Hello Morning" – Columbia 45438 – 1971
- "I Can't Hold On" / "Hello Morning" – Columbia 45509 – 1971
- "Leavin' In The Morning" (US Record World No. 140) / "Bless This Child" – Columbia 45678 – 1972

==== Albums ====
- The Gary Puckett Album (1971)
- Melodie (1982)
- Love Me Tonight (1992)
- As It Stands (1995)
- Time Pieces (1996)
- Is This Love (1997)
- Europa (1998)
- At Christmas (2001)
- The Lost Tapes (2005)
- This Is Love (2006)

== See also ==
- List of artists who reached number one on the UK Singles Chart
- List of acts who appeared on American Bandstand
- List of Columbia Records artists
