= Gary Puckett & The Union Gap's Greatest Hits =

Compilation album by Gary Puckett & The Union Gap
- Released: June 1970
- Genre: Pop, adult contemporary
- Length: 31:15
- Label: Columbia
- Producer: Jerry Fuller

Gary Puckett & The Union Gap chronology
The New Gary Puckett and the Union Gap Album (1969)	Gary Puckett & The Union Gap's Greatest Hits (1970)

Professional ratings
Review scores
Source	Rating
Allmusic	4/5 stars

Gary Puckett & The Union Gap's Greatest Hits is a compilation album by American pop band Gary Puckett & The Union Gap, released in 1970. The album was certified Platinum, selling well over a million copies in the United States alone. It peaked at #50 on the Billboard album chart.

The song "Let's Give Adam and Eve Another Chance" was released in March 1970 and hit #41 on the Billboard Hot 100 as well as #16 on the Adult contemporary chart. This was the last album by the band that contained a charting single.

== Track listing ==
Side one
No.	Title	Writer(s)	Original album	Length
1.	"Woman, Woman"	Jim Glaser; Jimmy Payne	Woman, Woman (1968)	3:11
2.	"Young Girl"	Jerry Fuller	Young Girl (1968)	3:08
3.	"Don't Give in to Him"	Gary Usher	The New Gary Puckett and the Union Gap Album (1969)	2:10
4.	"Home"	Mac Davis	The New Gary Puckett and the Union Gap Album	3:13
5.	"Let's Give Adam and Eve Another Chance"	Richard Mainegra; Red West	Columbia single 45097	2:42
6.	"Don't Make Promises"	Tim Hardin	Woman, Woman	2:26

Side two
No.	Title	Writer(s)	Original album	Length
1.	"This Girl Is a Woman Now"	Alan Bernstein; Victor Millrose	The New Gary Puckett and the Union Gap Album	3:04
2.	"Over You"	Jerry Fuller	Incredible (1968)	2:20
3.	"Reverend Posey"	Kerry Chater; Gary Withem	Incredible	3:43
4.	"Lady Willpower"	Jerry Fuller	Incredible	2:34
5.	"The Beggar"	Gary Puckett	Columbia single 45097	2:44
Total length:				31:15

Track information and credits verified from the album's liner notes.

== Charts ==
Chart (1970)	Peak position
US Billboard 200	50

Singles

Title	Chart	Peak position
Let's Give Adam and Eve Another Chance	US Billboard Hot 100	41
Let's Give Adam and Eve Another Chance	US Adult Contemporary (Billboard)	16
