= Kerry Chater =

Canadian musician and songwriter (1945–2022)

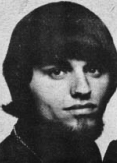
- Chater in 1968.

Background information
- Born: Kerry Michael Chater; August 7, 1945; Vancouver, British Columbia, Canada
- Died: February 4, 2022 (aged 76) Nashville, Tennessee, U.S.
- Genres: Rock; pop; blues rock; blue-eyed soul; country; traditional pop
- Occupations: Musician; songwriter
- Instrument: Bass
- Years active: 1966–2022
- Formerly of: Gary Puckett & The Union Gap
- Website: www.chatersongs.com

Kerry Michael Chater (August 7, 1945 – February 4, 2022) was a Canadian musician and songwriter who was best known as a member of Gary Puckett & The Union Gap. He was also a successful Nashville songwriter for many years.

== Career ==
Chater was born on August 7, 1945, in Vancouver, British Columbia. A bass player, in the mid-'60s he joined a band called The Progressives with Doug Ingle (keyboards), Gary 'Mutha' Whitem (sax) and Danny Weis (guitar). The Progressives eventually became part of Jeri and the Jeritones and then Palace Pages by 1965, after Jeri married Kerry. By 1966, Ingle, and Weis went off to form Iron Butterfly and Chater and Whitem joined The Outcasts with their friend Gary Puckett and others; this eventually became The Union Gap, which was signed by Columbia Records in 1967. Over the next two years the band had four songs in the top 10. Chater did much of the arranging for the live shows, wrote or co-wrote some of the album cuts and b-sides, and on rare occasions did a shared lead vocal. Chater and Gary "Mutha" Withem, the original keyboardist, left the band in 1970 as its popularity was declining.

Chater spent the next five years studying musical theater with Lehman Engel. Chater released two solo albums in the late 1970s: Part Time Love (1977) and Love on a Shoestring (1978); neither charted.

With veteran songwriter Charlie Black, Chater wrote "I Know a Heartache When I See One", which reached number 19 on the US and number 10 on the US country chart in 1979 for Jennifer Warnes. Chater has also written hits with Glen Ballard and Rory Bourke ("You Look So Good in Love"), singer Renee Armand ("What She Wants"), and his wife, Lynn Gillespie Chater ("I Meant to Do That", with Paul Brandt).

The song "I.O.U.", co-written with Austin Roberts, was a nominee for the 1984 Grammy Award for Best Country Song. Lee Greenwood's performance of the song won him the Grammy Award for Best Male Country Vocal Performance.

== Personal life and death ==
Chater was married to Lynn Gillespie-Chater, songwriter and co-author of their novel series "Kill Point". His mother was best selling Regency romance author Elizabeth Chater. Son Kerry Chater Jr. is a guitarist, and son Christopher John Chater is a science fiction author.

Chater died in Nashville, Tennessee, on February 4, 2022, at the age of 76.

== Charting songs ==
- "So Hard Livin' Without You" (Chater/John Bettis) - 1978 #62 for the band Airwaves
- "I Know a Heartache When I See One" (Chater/Charlie Black) - 1979 #19 US, #10 country for Jennifer Warnes
- "Love Knows We Tried" (Chater/Jan Crutchfield/Rory Bourke) - 1980 #40 country for Tanya Tucker
- "Love on a Shoestring" (Chater/Douglas L. A. Foxworthy) - 1980 #55 Hot 100 for Captain and Tennille; original by Chater on his album Love on a Shoestring (1978)
- "Even a Fool Would Let Go" (Chater/Tom Snow) - 1980 #61 country hit for Charlie Rich; many covers
- "(Want You) Back in My Life Again" (Chater/Chris Christian) - 1981 #72 Hot 100, #14 AC for The Carpenters
- "I.O.U." (Chater/Austin Roberts) - 1983 #6 country hit for Lee Greenwood; nominee for 1984 Grammy for Best Country Song
- "Stranger at My Door" (Chater/Rory Bourke/Charlie Black) - 1983 #45 country for Juice Newton
- "You Look So Good in Love" (Chater/Glen Ballard/Rory Michael Bourke) - 1983 #1 country hit for George Strait
- "You're the First Time I've Thought About Leaving" (Chater/Dickey Lee) - 1983 #1 country hit for Reba McEntire
- "What She Wants" (Chater/Renee Armand) - 1984 #8 country hit for Michael Martin Murphey
- "You've Got a Soft Place to Fall" (Chater/Bob McDill/H. Moore) - 1984 #44 country for Kathy Mattea
- "If Every Man Had a Woman Like You" (Chater/Ballard/Dahlstrom) - 1984 #39 country hit for The Osmonds
- "If I Had You" (Chater/Danny "Bear" Mayo) - 1989 #1 country hit for Alabama
- "Hey Mister (I Need This Job)" (Chater/Renee Armand) - 1992 #28 country for Shenandoah
- "I Meant to Do That" (L. G. Chater/K. Chater/Paul Brandt) - 1996 #39 country (#1 Canadian country) for Paul Brandt
- "That's the Way It Goes" (Chater/L. G. Chater/Cyril Rawson) - 1996 #19 Canadian AC for Anne Murray
- "You Go First (Do You Wanna Kiss)" (Chater/L. G. Chater/Cyril Rawson) - 1999 #25 country for Jessica Andrews

== Discography ==
=== With Gary Puckett & The Union Gap ===
==== Singles ====
| Year | (A-Side) (Songwriters) | B-Side (Songwriters) | Chart Positions | | | |
| Year | (A-Side) (Songwriters) | B-Side (Songwriters) | US | US AC | UK | AU |
|---|---|---|---|---|---|---|
| November 1967 † | "Woman, Woman" (Jim Glaser, Jimmy Payne) | "Don't Make Promises" (Tim Hardin) | 4 | - | 48 | 6 |
| March 1968 † | "Young Girl" (Jerry Fuller) | "I'm Losing You" (Jerry Fuller, Gary Puckett) | 2 | 34 | 1 | 2 |
| June 1968 ‡ | "Lady Willpower" (Jerry Fuller) | "Daylight Stranger" (Jerry Fuller, Gary Puckett) | 2 | 26 | 5 | 4 |
| September 1968 ‡ | "Over You" (Jerry Fuller) | "If The Day Would Come" (Kerry Chater, Gary Puckett, Gary Withem) | 7 | 3 | 54 | 8 |
| March 1969 ‡ | "Don't Give In to Him" (Gary Usher) | "Could I" (Jerry Fuller, Gary Puckett) | 15 | 13 | - | 24 |
| August 1969 ‡ | "This Girl Is a Woman Now" (Victor Millrose, Alan Bernstein) | "His Other Woman" (D. Allen, Kerry Chater) | 9 | 2 | - | 16 |
| March 1970 ‡ | "Let's Give Adam and Eve Another Chance" (Richard Mainegra, Red West) | "The Beggar" (E. Colville, Gary Puckett) | 41 | 16 | - | - |

Re-releases

| Year | Single | Chart Position |
| Year | Single | UK |
|---|---|---|
| June 1974 ‡ | "Young Girl" (CBS UK re-release) | 6 |

==== Albums ====
| Month and Year | Album title | U.S. Pop Albums | AUS |
|---|---|---|---|
| February 1968 † | Woman, Woman | 22 | - |
| May 1968 ‡ | Gary Puckett & The Union Gap Featuring "Young Girl" | 21 | - |
| November 1968 ‡ | Incredible | 20 | - |
| December 1969 ‡ | The New Gary Puckett and the Union Gap Album | 50 | - |
| July 1970 ‡ | Gary Puckett & The Union Gap's Greatest Hits | 50 | - |
| 1981 ‡ | The Best of Gary Puckett & The Union Gap | - | 32 |

† – Billed as The Union Gap featuring Gary Puckett

‡ – Billed as Gary Puckett & The Union Gap

=== Solo ===
==== Albums ====
- Part Time Love (1977)
- Love on a Shoestring (1978)

== See also ==
- Music of Canada
- List of Canadian musicians
