= List of number-one singles of 1968 (Canada) =

This is a list of the weekly Canadian RPM magazine (Note: The magazine's weekly record charts were digitized by the AV Trust. The collection is archived by Library and Archives Canada here. The PDF text search does not work unless you have additional software installed. You must view each entry on the chart for a match.) number one Top Singles chart of 1968. (Note: A collection of all the .pdf files cited is available here.) (Note: † On 21 March 1966, the chart became the RPM 100, as expanded to the top 100 singles.)

== Top singles chart of 1968 ==
Volume:Issue	Issue date(s)	Song	Artist	Reference
8:19	6 January	"Hello, Goodbye"	The Beatles	
8:20	13 January	"Woman, Woman"	The Union Gap	
8:21	20 January	"Next Plane to London"	The Rose Garden	
8:22	27 January	"Itchycoo Park"	Small Faces	
8:23	3 February	"I Wonder What She's Doing Tonight"	Tommy Boyce and Bobby Hart	
8:24	10 February	"Baby Now That I've Found You"	The Foundations	
8:25	17 February	"Zabadak"	Dave Dee, Dozy, Beaky, Mick & Tich	
8:26	24 February	"Spooky"	Classics IV	
9:1	2 March	"I Can Take or Leave Your Loving"	Herman's Hermits	
9:2	9 March	"Words"	Bee Gees	
9:3	16 March	"Simon Says"	1910 Fruitgum Company	
9:4	23 March	"The Ballad of Bonnie and Clyde"	Georgie Fame	
9:5	30 March	"The Ballad of Bonnie and Clyde"	Georgie Fame	
9:6	6 April	"La-La (Means I Love You)"	The Delfonics	
9:7	13 April	"Valleri"	The Monkees	
9:8	20 April	"Young Girl"	The Union Gap	
9:9	27 April	"Honey"	Bobby Goldsboro	
9:10	4 May	"Honey"	Bobby Goldsboro	
9:11	11 May	"A Beautiful Morning"	The Rascals	
9:12	18 May	"Mrs. Robinson"	Simon & Garfunkel	
9:13	25 May	"Mrs. Robinson"	Simon & Garfunkel	
9:14	1 June	"Master Jack"	Four Jacks and a Jill	
9:15	8 June	"Master Jack"	Four Jacks and a Jill	
9:16	15 June	"Yummy Yummy Yummy"	Ohio Express	
9:17	22 June	"MacArthur Park"	Richard Harris	
9:18	29 June	"This Guy's in Love with You"	Herb Alpert	
9:19	6 July	"Angel of the Morning"	Merrillee Rush	
9:20	13 July	"Lady Willpower"	Gary Puckett & The Union Gap	
9:21	20 July	"Lady Willpower"	Gary Puckett & The Union Gap	
9:21	27 July	"Lady Willpower"	Gary Puckett & The Union Gap	(Note: No issue was published the week of 27 July 1968, as implied by the issue numbering.)
9:22–23	3 August	"Lady Willpower"	Gary Puckett & The Union Gap	(Note: On the week of 3 August 1968, issues 22 & 23 are released.)
9:22–23	10 August	"Lady Willpower"	Gary Puckett & The Union Gap	(Note: On the week of 3 August 1968, issues 22 & 23 are released.)
9:24	19 August	"Hello, I Love You"	The Doors	(Note: On the week of 19 August 1968, the issues are numbered 23 & 24, in spite of 23 being an issue of 3 August 1968.)
9:26	26 August	"People Got to Be Free"	The Rascals	(Note: Although the charts were corresponding, the archive numbered this as no. 26 instead of 25.)
10.1	2 September	"Born to Be Wild"	Steppenwolf	
10.2	9 September	"Light My Fire"	José Feliciano	
10:3	16 September	"1, 2, 3, Red Light"	1910 Fruitgum Company	
10:4	23 September	"Harper Valley PTA"	Jeannie C. Riley	
10:5	30 September	"Hey Jude"	The Beatles	
10:6	7 October	"Hey Jude"	The Beatles	
10:7	14 October	"Hey Jude"	The Beatles	
10:8	21 October	"Fire"	Arthur Brown	
10:9	28 October	"Those Were the Days"	Mary Hopkin	
10:10	2 November	"Those Were the Days"	Mary Hopkin	
10:11	11 November	"Hold Me Tight"	Johnny Nash	
10:12	18 November	"Magic Carpet Ride"	Steppenwolf	
10:13	25 November	"Abraham, Martin and John"	Dion	
10:14	2 December	"Love Child"	Diana Ross & the Supremes	
10:15	9 December	"Love Child"	Diana Ross & the Supremes	
10:16	16 December	"Wichita Lineman"	Glen Campbell	
10:17–18	23 December	"Wichita Lineman"	Glen Campbell	(Note: On the week of 23 December 1968, issues 17 & 18 are released.)
10:17–18	30 December	"Wichita Lineman"	Glen Campbell	(Note: On the week of 23 December 1968, issues 17 & 18 are released.)

== See also ==
- 1968 in music
- List of Billboard Hot 100 number ones of 1968 (United States)
- List of Cashbox Top 100 number-one singles of 1968
