= Woman, Woman (disambiguation) =

Woman, Woman may refer to:

- Woman, Woman (Gary Puckett & The Union Gap album), 1968
  - Woman, Woman, the title song of the album
- Woman, Woman (Robert Goulet album)
- "Woman Woman", a song by Awolnation from the album Run
