= If I Could Only Dance with You =

Single by Jim Glaser

from the album The Man in the Mirror
- B-side: "Woman, Woman"
- Released: January 1984
- Recorded: February 1983
- Genre: Country
- Length: 2:59 (45 RPM/radio edit); 4:10 (album version)
- Label: Noble Vision 104
- Songwriter: Pat McManus
- Producer: Don Tolle

Jim Glaser singles chronology
"Man In the Mirror" (1983)	"If I Could Only Dance with You" (1984)	"You're Gettin' to Me Again" (1984)

"If I Could Only Dance with You" is a song written by Pat McManus, and recorded by American country music artist Jim Glaser. It was released in January 1984 as the fourth single from the album The Man in the Mirror.

In April 1984, it became the first of two top 10 hits for Glaser, peaking at No. 10 on the Billboard Hot Country Singles chart and No. 10 on the Canadian RPM Country Tracks chart.

The B-side of the single release was "Woman, Woman," a song composed by Glaser and Jimmy Payne, and made a top 5 pop hit in 1968 by Gary Puckett & The Union Gap.

== Charts ==
Chart (1984)	Peak position
US Hot Country Songs (Billboard)	10
Canadian RPM Country Tracks	10
