= Young Girl =

Young Girl may refer to:

- Young Girl (album), by Gary Puckett & The Union Gap, 1968
  - "Young Girl" (song), the title song
- The Young Girl, a 1975 Malian film
- "Young Girls", a 2013 song by Bruno Mars

== See also ==
- Girl
