= The Lost '60s Recordings =

Compilation album by Ricky Nelson, Jerry Fuller, Glen Campbell, Dave Burgess
- Released: May 2003
- Genre: Pop
- Label: Varese Sarabande
- Producer: Dave Burgess, Joe Johnson, Jerry Capehart

Professional ratings
Review scores
Source	Rating
Allmusic	link

The Lost '60s Recordings contains tracks from singles released by The Trophies and The Fleas in the early sixties for Challenge Records, plus solo tracks by the individual band members. Those bandmembers were Ricky Nelson, Jerry Fuller, Glen Campbell and Dave Burgess.

== Track listing ==
1. "Desire" (Fuller/Dobro) - The Trophies
2. "Doggone It" (Burgess) - The Trophies
3. "Everlovin'" (Burgess) - Dave Burgess And The Chimes
4. "A Wonder Like You" (Fuller) - Jerry Fuller
5. "Tears" (Burgess) - The Fleas
6. "Shy Away" (Burgess) - Jerry Fuller
7. "First Love Never Dies" (Morris/Seals) - Jerry Fuller
8. "I'm Available" (Burgess/Earl) - Dave Burgess
9. "I Laughed So Hard I Cried" (Burgess) - The Trophies
10. "Guilty Of Loving You" (Fuller) - Jerry Fuller
11. "Scratchin'" (Burgess/Fuller) - The Fleas
12. "Betty My Angel" (Fuller/Silva) - Jerry Fuller
13. "Peg O' My Heart" (Bryan/Fisher) - The Trophies
14. "The Place Where I Cry" (Fuller/Burgess) - Jerry Fuller
15. "Charlene" (Fuller/Silva) - Jerry Fuller
16. "Felicia" (Burgess) - The Trophies
17. "That's All I Want From You" (Rotha/Rotter) - The Trophies
18. "Turn Around, Look at Me" (Capehart) - Glen Campbell

== Personnel ==
- The Trophies/The Fleas:

Ricky Nelson - lead vocals
Dave Burgess - vocals, rhythm guitar
Glen Campbell - lead guitar
Jerry Fuller - vocals, guitar

- Backing vocals - Jimmy Seals and Dash Crofts

== Production ==
- Producers - Dave Burgess, Joe Johnson, Jerry Capehart
- Mastered by Steve Massie/Steve Massie Productions
- Arranged by Ernie Freeman
- Collection produced by Cary E. Mansfield, Steve Massie
- Liner notes by Bill Dahl
- Art direction/design by Bill Pitzonka
- Photos courtesy of Tony Barrett, Dave Burgess, Jerry Fuller, Michael Ochs Archives
