= Elizabeth Chater =

Canadian novelist, poet, and professor

- Born: Elizabeth Eileen Chater; August 22, 1910; Vancouver, British Columbia, Canada
- Died: November 10, 2004 (aged 94); Irvine, California, US
- Occupations: Writer, Professor of Emeritus
- Children: Kerry Chater
- Writing career
- Pen name: Lee Chater, Lee Chaytor, Lisa Moore.
- Genres: Historical romance, science fiction
- Website: www.elizabethchater.com

Elizabeth Eileen Chater (pen name, Lee Chaytor; August 22, 1910 – November 10, 2004) was a Canadian writer of novels and poetry, and a professor at San Diego State University.

== Early life and education ==
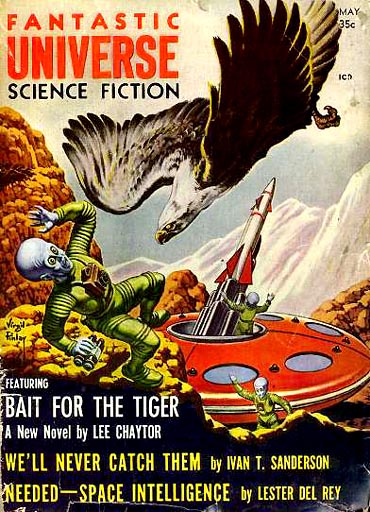
Chater's novelette "Bait for the Tiger" was cover-featured on the May 1958 issue of Fantastic Universe

Chater was born August 22, 1910, in Vancouver, British Columbia, Canada. Her father was a successful attorney who provided a home with a library filled with books. At a time when women were not encouraged to seek higher education, she attended the University of British Columbia at sixteen. While there, she was the President of the Debating Society, Vice President of the senior class, and graduated with honors with a Bachelor of Arts degree.

== Career ==
She married Melville Thomas Chater in 1932. They moved to Chicago while he attended George Williams College. Returning to Toronto, where he worked for the YMCA, they started their family of three children: Elizabeth Patricia, Eve Lynn, and Kerry Michael. They moved to the United States in 1952. It was during this time that she started writing and teaching at Palos Verdes College.

Under the pseudonym Lee Chaytor, she published several stories in the popular science fiction magazine Fantastic Universe. In 1961, she became a professor at San Diego State College (now San Diego State University), and was awarded a master's degree with honors. It was there that she began a pioneering effort by teaching a course in Science Fiction Creative Writing with Greg Bear as her teacher's assistant. Among the faculty at the time were authors Vernor Vinge and Joan D. Vinge. Patricia Elgin was a student of hers, as was J. Michael Straczynski. Her classes were enormously popular.

In 1968, she won the Distinguished Teacher Award and in 1977 she won the Outstanding Teacher of the Year Award. In 1973, she became the inaugural faculty advisor for the S.T.A.R. San Diego on-campus Science Fiction club. Elizabeth taught for seventeen years, attaining full tenure, and retired as a professor emeritus. Her professorial legacy survives in the Special Collections Department of SDSU where the Chater Collection is not only archived, but still used by college professors as a teaching tool. The Chater collection includes a one of a kind original manuscript written by her, and original manuscripts both typed and handwritten by author Joan D. Vinge. There is also her science fiction collection of over 2,500 books and periodicals that she generously donated to the school, a collection that continues to grow through donations from students and faculty. There are now more than 4,000 books in the collection.

After the death of her husband in 1978, and with the help of her former student and great friend Greg Bear, she formed a partnership with the New York literary agent Richard Curtis. She went on to publish 23 novels in eight years. During this time, she was also on the lecture circuit giving inspirational talks on history and religion, topics of great interest for her.

== Death ==
Elizabeth Chater died on November 10, 2004, at the age of 94.

== Personal life ==
She was the mother of Gary Puckett and the Union Gap bassist Kerry Chater, and the grandmother of author Christopher John Chater. In 2011, Elizabeth's heirs had her literary rights reverted to the family, and her extensive catalog of books was then published by the family run company, Chater Publishing, headed by Christopher John Chater.

== Partial book list ==
- The Elsingham Portrait (1980)
- The Gamester (1980)
- Milady Hot-At-Hand (1981)
- Lord Randal's Tiger (1981)
- Gallant Lady (1981)
- The Random Gentleman (1981)
- A Season for the Heart (1981)
- Angela (1982)
- Milord's Liegewoman (1982)
- A Delicate Situation (1982)
- The Marriage Mart (1983)
- Emerald Love (1983)
- The Reformed Rake (1984)
- The King's Doll (1984)
- The Earl and the Emigree (1985)
- The Runaway Debutante (1985)
- Lady Dearborn's Debut (1986)
- The Duke's Dilemma (1986)
- A Place for Alfreda (1987)
- A Time to Love (1987)
- Miss Cayley's Unicorn (1988)
- The Big Sling (2011, posthumously)
