= Woman, Woman (Gary Puckett & The Union Gap album) =

Studio album by Gary Puckett & The Union Gap
- Released: January 10, 1968
- Genre: Pop
- Label: Columbia
- Producer: Jerry Fuller

Gary Puckett & The Union Gap chronology
Woman, Woman (1968)	Young Girl (1968)

Professional ratings
Review scores
Source	Rating
Allmusic	3/5 stars

Woman, Woman is the Gold-selling debut album by Gary Puckett & The Union Gap, released in early 1968.

The title track hit No. 3 on the Cash Box Top 100 and No. 4 on the Billboard Hot 100. The album landed on the Billboard 200 chart, reaching No. 22.

The cover art contains an error which lists the song "To Love Somebody" as "To Love Someone".

== Track listing ==
=== Side 1 ===
1. "Woman, Woman" (Jim Glaser, Jimmy Payne)
2. "M'Lady" (Steve Karliski)
3. "By the Time I Get to Phoenix" (Jimmy Webb)
4. "Paindrops" (Jerry Fuller)
5. "Believe Me" (Gary Puckett)
6. "I Want a New Day" (Kerry Chater)

=== Side 2 ===
1. "You Better Sit Down Kids" (Sonny Bono)
2. "Kentucky Woman" (Neil Diamond)
3. "My Son (version 1)" (Gary Withem, Kerry Chater)
4. "To Love Somebody" (Barry Gibb, Robin Gibb)
5. "Don't Make Promises" (Tim Hardin)

== Personnel ==
The Union Gap

- Gary Puckett – lead vocals, guitar
- Kerry Chater – bass guitar
- Gary "Mutha" Withem – organ, piano, soprano saxophone, flute
- Dwight Bemont – tenor saxophone
- Paul Wheatbread – drums

Additional personnel

- Al Capps – orchestral arrangements
- Jerry Fuller – production

== Chart positions ==
Album

Year	Chart	Peak position
1968	US Billboard Top LPs	22

Singles

Year	Single	Chart	Peak position
1968	"Woman, Woman"	US Billboard Hot 100	4
1968	"Woman, Woman"	UK Singles Chart	48
