= List of acts who appeared on American Bandstand =

List of acts who appeared on the television show American Bandstand.

== 0-9 ==
- The 13th Floor Elevators
- 1910 Fruitgum Company
- 20/20
- The 5th Dimension
- 9.9

== A ==
- a-ha
- Willie Aames
- ABBA
- Gregory Abbott
- ABC
- Adam and the Ants
- Bryan Adams
- Aerosmith
- Alabama
- All Sports Band
- The Alarm
- Deborah Allen
- The Animals
- Paul Anka
- Ann-Margret
- Susan Anton
- Adam Ant
- America
- Animotion
- Ashford & Simpson
- The Association
- Christopher Atkins
- Atlantic Starr
- Patti Austin
- Autograph
- Frankie Avalon
- Angel

== B ==
- The B'zz
- The Babys
- Bachman–Turner Overdrive
- Badfinger
- Philip Bailey
- Baltimora
- Scott Baio
- Anita Baker
- Joby Baker
- LaVern Baker
- Marty Balin
- Bananarama
- The Bangles
- Len Barry
- Toni Basil
- Fontella Bass
- Bay City Rollers
- Berlin
- The Beach Boys
- Beastie Boys
- The Beatles (on video not live)
- The Beat
- The Beau Brummels
- Bee Gees
- Pat Benatar
- Robby Benson
- Tony Bennett
- Barbi Benton
- Chuck Berry
- Elvin Bishop
- Stephen Bishop
- Big Country
- Jack Blanchard & Misty Morgan
- Blancmange
- The Blasters
- Blondie
- Bloodstone
- Kurtis Blow
- The Blow Monkeys
- Blue Cheer
- The BoDeans
- Michael Bolton
- The Boomtown Rats
- Bon Jovi
- Danny Bonaduce
- Gary U.S. Bonds
- Debby Boone
- Pat Boone
- Bourgeois Tagg
- David Bowie
- Jimmy Boyd
- Bow Wow Wow
- The Boys
- The Brady Bunch Kids (Barry Williams, Maureen McCormick, Christopher Knight, Susan Olsen, Eve Plumb and Mike Lookinland)
- Laura Branigan
- Bob Braun (also guest-hosted)
- Brass Construction
- Bread
- Brick
- Alicia Bridges
- Johnny Bristol
- The Brooklyn Bridge
- Brooklyn Dreams
- The Brothers Johnson
- James Brown
- James Brown & The Famous Flames
- Peter Brown
- Anita Bryant
- Bubble Puppy
- The Buckinghams
- Buckner & Garcia
- Buffalo Springfield
- Solomon Burke
- Johnny Burnette
- Rocky Burnette
- George Burns
- The Busboys
- The Byrds
- Edd Byrnes

== C ==
- John Cafferty & The Beaver Brown Band
- Jonathan Cain
- Bobby Caldwell
- Glen Campbell
- Cannibal & the Headhunters
- Freddy Cannon (holds the record for most appearances at 110)
- Captain & Tennille
- Irene Cara
- Carl Carlton
- Eric Carmen
- Kim Carnes
- The Carpenters
- Belinda Carlisle
- Bill Carroll
- Mel Carter
- Johnny Cash
- Rosanne Cash
- David Cassidy
- Shaun Cassidy
- Boomer Castleman
- The Chairmen of the Board
- Champaign
- The Champs
- Harry Chapin
- Charlene
- Charles Wright & the Watts 103rd Street Rhythm Band
- Charo
- Cheech & Chong
- Cher
- Cherrelle
- The Chi-Lites
- Chubby Checker
- Chic
- Chilliwack
- The Chordettes
- Lou Christie
- Wang Chung
- Jimmy Clanton
- Roy Clark
- Patsy Cline
- The Coasters
- Eddie Cochran
- Natalie Cole
- Judy Collins
- The Commodores
- Perry Como
- Con Funk Shun
- Sam Cooke
- Coven
- The Cover Girls
- The Cowsills
- Billy "Crash" Craddock
- Creedence Clearwater Revival
- Marshall Crenshaw
- The Crests
- Jim Croce
- Crowded House
- The Crystals
- Culture Club
- Burton Cummings
- Andre Cymone
- The Classics IV

== D ==
- Dick Dale
- Vic Damone
- Ron Dante
- E.G. Daily
- Michael Damian
- Danny and the Juniors
- Bobby Darin
- James Darren
- Mac Davis
- Paul Davis (singer)
- Skeeter Davis
- Tyrone Davis
- Bobby Day
- Taylor Dayne
- The Dazz Band
- Jimmy Dean
- DeBarge
- Rick Dees
- Def Leppard
- The DeFranco Family
- The Delfonics
- The Del-Vikings
- The Dells
- The Delicates
- Jackie DeShannon
- Devo
- Neil Diamond
- The Diamonds
- Dick and Dee Dee
- Dino, Desi & Billy
- Dion and the Belmonts
- Dion DiMucci (solo)
- Disco-Tex and the Sex-O-Lettes
- Dokken
- Dolenz, Jones, Boyce & Hart
- Fats Domino
- Troy Donahue
- Bo Donaldson and The Heywoods
- Donovan
- The Doors
- Ronnie Dove
- The Dovells
- Lamont Dozier
- The Dramatics
- The Dream Academy
- The Drifters
- Dr. Hook
- Dr. John
- Tony Dow
- George Duke
- Robbie Dupree

== E ==
- Sheila E.
- Sheena Easton
- Billy Eckstine
- Duane Eddy
- Dave Edmunds
- Dennis Edwards
- Electric Light Orchestra
- Yvonne Elliman
- Cass Elliot
- The Emotions
- England Dan & John Ford Coley
- The English Beat
- Eric Martin Band
- David Essex
- Eternity's Children
- Betty Everett
- The Everly Brothers
- Exposé
- B.T. Express

== F ==
- Shelley Fabares
- Fabian
- The Fabulous Thunderbirds
- Adam Faith
- Falco
- Fanny
- Jose Feliciano
- Kim Fields
- Firefall
- Five Man Electrical Band
- The Five Satins
- Five Star
- The Fixx
- The Flamingos
- Flash Cadillac & the Continental Kids
- Mick Fleetwood's Zoo
- The Fleshtones
- The Flirts
- The Floaters
- A Flock of Seagulls
- Tom Fogerty
- The Four Coins
- The Four Lads
- The Four Preps
- The Four Seasons
- Four Tops
- Tennessee Ernie Ford
- Peter Frampton
- Connie Francis
- Franke and the Knockouts
- Aretha Franklin
- Bobby Freeman
- The Frogmen
- Annette Funicello
- Harvey Fuqua & The Moonglows
- Richie Furay

== G ==
- The Gap Band
- Leif Garrett
- Siedah Garrett
- Kathy Garver
- Kelly Groucutt
- Gary's Gang
- Marvin Gaye
- Crystal Gayle
- Gloria Gaynor
- The J. Geils Band
- The Georgia Satellites
- Andy Gibb
- George Baker Selection
- General Public
- Georgia Gibbs
- Debbie Gibson
- Nick Gilder
- Giuffria
- Go West
- The Go-Go's
- Golden Earring
- Lesley Gore
- Robert Goulet
- Larry Graham
- Eddy Grant
- The Grass Roots
- Dobie Gray
- Cyndi Grecco
- Buddy Greco
- Al Green
- Norman Greenbaum
- Rosey Grier
- Merv Griffin
- Larry Groce
- GTR
- The Guess Who
- Gunhill Road (season 16, episode 32, aired June 9, 1973)

== H ==
- Hair (entire cast)
- Haircut One Hundred
- Bill Haley & His Comets
- Hall & Oates
- Hamilton, Joe Frank & Reynolds
- Albert Hammond
- Wayne Handy
- Slim Harpo
- Corey Hart
- Ritchie Hart (aka Charlie Gearheart)
- Dan Hartman
- Dale Hawkins
- Isaac Hayes
- The Edwin Hawkins Singers
- Justin Hayward
- Robert Hazard
- Joey Heatherton
- Heaven 17
- Bobby Helms
- Clarence "Frogman" Henry
- Patrick Hernandez
- Howard Hewett
- Roger Hodgson
- Amy Holland
- The Hollies
- Buddy Holly and the Crickets
- Rupert Holmes
- Honey Cone
- Thelma Houston
- Miki Howard
- The Hudson Brothers
- The Hues Corporation
- Huey Lewis and the News
- Brian Hyland
- The Huns

== I ==
- The Icicle Works
- Billy Idol
- The Impressions
- Incredible Bongo Band
- Information Society
- James Ingram
- INXS
- Iron Butterfly
- Isley-Jasper-Isley

== J ==
- Terry Jacks
- The Jackson 5
- Freddie Jackson
- Janet Jackson
- Jermaine Jackson
- Joe Jackson
- La Toya Jackson
- Marlon Jackson
- Michael Jackson
- Millie Jackson
- Wanda Jackson
- The Jaggerz
- The Jam
- Etta James
- Joni James
- Rick James
- Sonny James
- Tommy James
- Jan and Dean
- Miles Jaye
- The Jaynetts
- Jefferson Airplane
- Jefferson Starship
- Jellybean Benitez
- The Jets
- John Fred & His Playboy Band
- Robert John
- Sammy Johns
- Johnny and the Hurricanes
- Davy Jones
- Grace Jones
- Howard Jones
- Jack Jones
- The Jordan Brothers
- The Junkyard Dog

== K ==
- Katrina and the Waves
- Kalin Twins
- Kitty Kallen
- KC and the Sunshine Band
- Eddie Kendricks
- Rufus featuring Chaka Khan
- The Greg Kihn Band
- Andy Kim
- B.B. King
- Ben E. King
- Evelyn 'Champagne' King
- The Kings
- Kiss
- Gladys Knight & the Pips
- Jean Knight
- Kool & the Gang

== L ==
- LL Cool J
- Labelle
- Lady Pank
- Lakeside
- Major Lance
- Stacy Lattisaw
- Cyndi Lauper
- Vicki Lawrence
- Brenda Lee
- Peggy Lee
- Julian Lennon
- Lenny and the Squigtones (Michael McKean and David Lander)
- Level 42
- LeVert
- Jerry Lee Lewis
- Mark Lindsay
- Lisa Lisa & Cult Jam
- Little Anthony and the Imperials
- Little Eva
- Little Richard
- Little River Band
- Little Willie John
- Lobo
- The Lockers
- Loggins & Messina
- Looking Glass
- Trini Lopez
- Donna Loren
- Los Lobos
- Love
- Darlene Love
- Mike Love
- Love Unlimited Orchestra
- Loverboy
- The Lovin' Spoonful
- Nick Lowe
- L.T.D.
- Lulu
- Frankie Lymon and the Teenagers

== M ==
- Mary MacGregor
- Madonna
- Madness
- The Main Ingredient
- The Mamas & the Papas
- Henry Mancini
- The Manhattan Transfer
- The Manhattans
- Barry Manilow
- Herbie Mann
- Hal March
- Benny Mardones
- Teena Marie
- Al Martino
- The Marvelettes
- Dave Mason
- Richard Marx
- Mary Jane Girls
- Johnny Mathis
- Curtis Mayfield
- Maze
- C. W. McCall
- Marilyn McCoo and Billy Davis Jr.
- Gwen McCrae
- Jimmy McCracklin
- McFadden and Whitehead
- Maureen McGovern
- The McGuire Sisters
- Don McLean
- Christine McVie
- Melissa Manchester
- Bill Medley
- Melanie
- John Mellencamp
- The Mello-Kings
- Harold Melvin & the Blue Notes
- Men at Work
- Sérgio Mendes
- Miami Sound Machine
- Mickey & Sylvia
- Midnight Star
- The Mike Curb Congregation
- Mike + The Mechanics
- Jody Miller
- Roger Miller
- Stephanie Mills
- Ronnie Milsap
- Sal Mineo
- The Miracles
- Molly Hatchet
- Eddie Money
- Van Morrison
- The Motels
- Alison Moyet
- The Monkees
- Chris Montez
- Mr. Mister
- Mrs. Miller
- Martin Mull
- Walter Murphy

== N ==
- Naked Eyes
- The Natural Four
- Johnny Nash
- David Naughton
- Mike Nesmith
- Robbie Nevil
- New Edition
- New Seekers
- Juice Newton
- Wayne Newton
- Maxine Nightingale
- Night Ranger
- Leonard Nimoy
- The Nitty Gritty Dirt Band
- Kenny Nolan
- Nu Shooz

== O ==
- John O'Banion
- Billy Ocean
- The Ohio Players
- Oingo Boingo
- Oliver
- Nigel Olsson
- Roy Orbison
- Orchestral Manoeuvres in the Dark
- Alexander O'Neal
- Tony Orlando and Dawn
- Jeffrey Osborne
- Donny Osmond
- Marie Osmond
- The Osmonds
- The Outfield

== P ==
- Pablo Cruise
- Patti Page
- Robert Palmer
- Ray Parker Jr.
- John Parr
- The Partland Brothers
- Dolly Parton
- Billy Paul
- Paul Petersen
- Freda Payne
- Peaches & Herb
- Pebbles
- People!
- People's Choice
- Peppermint Rainbow
- Peter, Paul & Mary
- Bernadette Peters
- Phantom, Rocker & Slick
- Jim Photoglo
- Bobby "Boris" Pickett
- Pink Floyd
- Gene Pitney
- The Platters
- Player
- Poco
- The Pointer Sisters
- Bonnie Pointer
- Pratt & McClain
- Billy Preston
- Pretty Poison
- Prime Time
- Prince
- The Psychedelic Furs
- Public Image Ltd.
- Gary Puckett & The Union Gap
- Pure Prairie League
- The Pyramids

== Q ==
- Quarterflash
- Question Mark and the Mysterians
- The Quin-Tones

== R ==
- Eddie Rabbitt
- The Raes
- Tony Randall
- The Raspberries
- Rare Earth
- Lou Rawls
- Johnnie Ray
- Susan Raye
- Raydio
- Real Life
- Redbone
- Otis Redding
- Helen Reddy
- Redeye
- Red Rider
- Della Reese
- Regina
- The Reflections
- R.E.M.
- Martha Reeves and the Vandellas
- REO Speedwagon
- Paul Revere and the Raiders
- Cliff Richard
- Little Richard
- Lionel Richie
- The Righteous Brothers
- Jeannie C. Riley
- Minnie Riperton
- Rodney Allen Rippy
- Johnny Rivers
- Smokey Robinson
- Smokey Robinson and The Miracles
- Vicki Sue Robinson
- Rockpile
- Rockwell
- Jimmie Rodgers
- Tommy Roe
- Fred Rogers
- Kenny Rogers
- Roy Rogers and Dale Evans
- Romeo Void
- The Romantics
- Don Rondo
- The Ronettes
- Linda Ronstadt
- The Rose Garden
- Rose Royce
- The Rubinoos
- David Ruffin
- Jimmy Ruffin
- Rufus featuring Chaka Khan
- Run-D.M.C.
- Jennifer Rush
- Merrilee Rush
- Patrice Rushen
- Bobby Rydell
- Mitch Ryder

== S ==
- Buffy Sainte-Marie
- Sam & Dave
- Evie Sands
- Tommy Sands
- Samantha Sang
- Larry Santos
- Scandal
- Peter Schilling
- Timothy B. Schmit
- Freddie Scott
- Scritti Politti
- John Sebastian
- Neil Sedaka
- Michael Sembello
- Sha Na Na
- Shalamar
- Tommy Shaw
- The Seeds
- Ravi Shankar
- Shannon
- Sa-Fire
- Sweet Sensation
- Jules Shear
- Del Shannon
- Feargal Sharkey
- Dee Dee Sharp
- Bobby Sherman
- The Shirelles
- Dinah Shore
- The Short Cuts (Margy and Mary Ellen Keegan)
- Richard Simmons
- Joe Simon
- Paul Simon and Art Garfunkel
- Simple Minds
- Sir Douglas Quintet
- Slade
- Sister Sledge
- Grace Slick
- Somethin' Smith and the Redheads
- Bert Sommer
- Sonny and Cher
- Jimmy Soul
- The Soul Train Gang
- JD Souther
- Sparks
- Ronnie Spector (with Eddie Money)
- The Spinners
- The Spiral Starecase
- Split Enz
- The Spokesmen
- Dusty Springfield
- Rick Springfield
- Squeeze
- Stabilizers
- Frank Stallone
- The Staple Singers
- Edwin Starr
- Candi Staton
- Steely Dan
- Steppenwolf
- Connie Stevens
- Ray Stevens
- Stephen Stills
- Jermaine Stewart
- Stonebolt
- Stories
- Strawberry Alarm Clock
- The Stray Cats
- Steam
- Stryper
- The Sugarhill Gang
- Sugarloaf
- Donna Summer (co-hosted on May 27, 1978)
- The Sunshine Company
- The Supremes
- Keith Sweat
- Sweetwater
- Swing Out Sister
- The Sylvers
- Sylvester

== T ==
- Talking Heads
- A Taste of Honey
- Tavares
- James Taylor
- Johnnie Taylor
- Livingston Taylor
- Tears for Fears
- The Temptations
- B.J. Thomas
- Carla Thomas
- Rufus Thomas
- Three Dog Night
- Thompson Twins
- George Thorogood & the Destroyers
- Tierra
- Tiffany
- 'Til Tuesday
- Johnny Tillotson
- The Time
- Mel Tormé
- The Toys
- Joey Travolta
- John Travolta
- Tanya Tucker
- Ike and Tina Turner
- The Turtles
- Tommy Tutone
- Dwight Twilley
- The Twisters
- Conway Twitty
- Bonnie Tyler

== U ==
- UB40
- Leslie Uggams
- Underground Sunshine
- The Undisputed Truth

== V ==
- Jerry Vale
- Ritchie Valens
- Frankie Valli
- Luther Vandross
- Vanity (Denise Matthews)
- Vanity 6
- Gino Vannelli
- Sarah Vaughan
- Bobby Vee
- The Ventures
- Billy Vera and The Beaters
- The Village People
- Gene Vincent & His Blue Caps
- Bobby Vinton
- The Virtues
- Vito and the Salutations

== W ==
- Wadsworth Mansion
- Jack Wagner
- John Waite
- Junior Walker & the All-Stars
- Wall of Voodoo
- War
- Anita Ward
- Jennifer Warnes
- Dionne Warwick
- Jody Watley
- Don Wayne
- We Five
- The Weather Girls
- Bob Welch
- Cory Wells
- Mary Wells
- Wham!
- What Is This?
- The Whispers
- Johnny Whitaker
- Barry White
- Wild Cherry
- Eugene Wilde
- Matthew Wilder
- Andy Williams
- Billy Williams
- Deniece Williams
- Bruce Willis
- Al Wilson
- Carl Wilson
- Jackie Wilson
- Wire Train
- Bill Withers
- Bobby Womack
- Stevie Wonder
- Brenton Wood
- Tom Wopat
- Link Wray
- Dale Wright and the Rock-Its
- Gary Wright
- Syreeta Wright

== X ==
- X

== Y ==
- Timi Yuro
- "Weird Al" Yankovic
- Yarbrough and Peoples
- Kathy Young
- Paul Young
- Y&T
