= A Wonder Like You =

Single by Rick Nelson
- B-side: "Everlovin'"
- Released: September 18, 1961
- Genre: Pop
- Length: 2:34
- Label: Imperial Records 5770
- Songwriter(s): Jerry Fuller

Rick Nelson singles chronology
"Travelin' Man" / "Hello Mary Lou" (1961)	"A Wonder Like You" (1961)	"Young World" / "Summertime" (1962)

"A Wonder Like You" is a song written by Jerry Fuller and performed by Rick Nelson.

== Chart performance ==
"A Wonder Like You" reached #11 on the Billboard Hot 100 in 1961.

== Other versions ==
- Jerry Fuller recorded a version that was released on the 2003 album, The Lost '60s Recordings.
