= Young World (song) =

Single by Rick Nelson
- B-side: "Summertime"
- Released: February 24, 1962
- Genre: Ballad
- Length: 2:23
- Label: Imperial
- Songwriter(s): Jerry Fuller

Rick Nelson singles chronology
"A Wonder Like You" / "Everlovin'" (1961)	"Young World" (1962)	"Teen Age Idol" (1962)

"Young World" is a song written by Jerry Fuller and performed by Rick Nelson. It was released as a single in 1962 on Imperial Records. The song reached No. 5 on the Billboard Hot 100 singles chart. In the UK, it reached No. 19.

== Background ==
The personnel on "Young World" included The Wrecking Crew guitarist Glen Campbell and Nelson session regular James Burton on lead guitar. Joe Osborn played bass, with Ritchie Frost on drums and Jim Pierce on piano.

== Cover versions ==
- Arthur Alexander (album You Better Move On/1962).
- James Darren (album Love Among the Young/1964)
- Detlef Engel ("Isabella" German/1962)
- Leif Garrett as the B-side to his 1977 single, "Come Back When You Grow Up".
