= Let's Give Adam and Eve Another Chance =

Single by Gary Puckett & The Union Gap

from the album Gary Puckett & The Union Gap's Greatest Hits
- B-side: "The Beggar"
- Released: March 1970
- Recorded: January 8, 1970
- Genre: Rock
- Length: 2:47
- Label: Columbia
- Songwriters: Red West, Richard Mainegra
- Producer: Dick Glasser

Gary Puckett & The Union Gap singles chronology
"This Girl Is a Woman Now" (1969)	"Let's Give Adam and Eve Another Chance" (1970)	"Young Girl" (1974)

"Let's Give Adam and Eve Another Chance" is a song written by Red West and Richard Mainegra. It was recorded by Gary Puckett & The Union Gap for their 1970 album, Gary Puckett & The Union Gap's Greatest Hits. The song reached #41 on The Billboard Hot 100 in 1970 and #16 on the Adult Contemporary chart. In Canada it reached #36 on the Top 100 charts and #28 on the AC charts.

This was the last charting single for the band. Bandmates Kerry Chater and Gary Withem left the band shortly after the song's release due to management of the band demanding they receive weekly salaries instead of a percentage of the band's revenues.
