= The Rose Garden (album) =

Studio album by The Rose Garden
- Released: April 1968
- Recorded: 1967–1968
- Studio: Gold Star (Hollywood); Nashville West (Hollywood)
- Genre: Folk rock
- Length: 29:31
- Label: Atco
- Producer: Brian Stone, Charles Greene, Pat Pipolo

Professional ratings
Review scores
Source	Rating
AllMusic	3/5 stars

The Rose Garden is the only album from the American folk rock group of the same name. It was released in April 1968 on Atco Records and included their top 20 hit "Next Plane to London".

== Overview ==
The band was heavily influenced by the Byrds' style of vocal harmony and 12-string guitar blending and the album includes two Gene Clark compositions, "Till Today" and "Long Time". The group also recorded "Rider", which was first recorded by the Byrds in 1966, but not yet released. The only original composition was "Flower Town". Originally issued by Atco Records, it was reissued on CD by Collector's Choice Music. Atco's current distributing label Rhino Records has made this album available for digital downloads.

== Chart performance ==
The Rose Garden reached No. 176 on the Billboard Top LPs chart, remaining on the chart for two weeks.

== Track listing ==
=== Side one ===
1. "Next Plane to London" (Kenny Gist, Jr.)
2. "I'm Only Second" (Charles W. Higgins, Pat Vegas)
3. "February Sunshine" (Pat Vegas, Val Geary)
4. "Coins of Fun" (Leonard A. Metzger, Pat Vegas)
5. "Rider" (Traditional; arranged by Bruce Boudin, Diana Di Rose, James Groshong, John Noreen and William Fleming)

=== Side two ===
1. "She Belongs to Me" (Bob Dylan)
2. "Flower Town" (Bruce Boudin, Diana Di Rose, James Groshong, John Noreen, Kim Fowley, William Fleming)
3. "Till Today" (Gene Clark)
4. "Look What You've Done" (Bob Johnston, Wes Farrell)
5. "Long Time" (Gene Clark)

== Personnel ==
- John Noreen – lead guitar
- James Groshong – guitar, vocals
- Diana Di Rose – acoustic guitar, vocals
- William Fleming – bass
- Bruce Boudin – drums

== Charts ==
Chart (1968)	Peak position
US Billboard Top LPs	176
