= Everlovin' =

- Danish release picture sleeve

Single by Rick Nelson
- A-side: "A Wonder Like You"
- Released: September 18, 1961
- Genre: Rock & Roll
- Length: 2:00
- Label: Imperial Records 5770
- Songwriter: Dave Burgess

Rick Nelson singles chronology
"Travelin' Man" / "Hello Mary Lou" (1961)	"Everlovin'" (1961)	"Young World" / "Summertime" (1962)

"Everlovin'" is a song written by Dave Burgess and first recorded by the Australian vocal trio, The Crescents, who released the song in 1959.

== Rick Nelson recording ==
Ricky Nelson toured Australia soon after and the Crescents were one of the support acts. Nelson liked the song and later recorded it. Nelson's version of the song reached No. 16 on the Billboard Hot 100 and No. 23 in the UK in 1961.

== Other versions ==
- Robin Luke released a version as the B-side to his 1960 single "Well Oh, Well Oh".
- The song's writer, Dave Burgess, recorded a version of the song that was released on the 2003 album, The Lost '60s Recordings.
