= You're Gettin' to Me Again =

Single by Jim Glaser

from the album The Man in the Mirror
- B-side: "Stand by the Road"
- Released: June 9, 1984
- Recorded: February 1983
- Genre: Country
- Length: 3:19
- Label: Noble Vision #105
- Songwriter(s): Woody Bomar; Pat McManus
- Producer(s): Don Tolle

Jim Glaser singles chronology
"If I Could Only Dance with You" (1984)	"You're Gettin' to Me Again" (1984)	"Let Me Down Easy" (1984)

"You're Gettin' to Me Again" is a song written by Pat McManus and Woody Bomar, and recorded by American country music artist Jim Glaser. It was released in June 1984 as the fifth single from the album The Man in the Mirror. In September, the song was his only No. 1 hit on the Hot Country Singles charts, holding that position for one week, and spending twenty one weeks on this chart. The song peaked at number three on the Canadian country music charts published by RPM.

When "You're Gettin' to Me Again" reached No. 1, Glaser accomplished something that he failed to do with his better-known brother, Tompall. Jim had recorded as part of the trio Tompall and the Glaser Brothers (Chuck Glaser was part of the group as well), and the closest any of their hits came to the top was 1981's "Lovin' Her Was Easier (Than Anything I'll Ever Do Again)", stopping at No. 2 that July.

A music video was produced for "You're Gettin' to Me Again".

== Chart positions ==
Chart (1984)	Peak position
US Hot Country Songs (Billboard)	1
Canadian RPM Country Tracks	3

1984 Year-End Chart	Position
U.S. Billboard Hot Country Singles	6
