= Travelin' Man =

- Travelin' Man by Ricky Nelson

Single by Ricky Nelson

from the album Rick Is 21
- A-side: "Hello Mary Lou"
- Released: April 1961
- Genre: Pop; doo-wop
- Length: 2:24
- Label: Imperial Records #5741
- Songwriter: Jerry Fuller
- Producer: Joe Johnson (Challenge Records)

Ricky Nelson singles chronology
"You Are The Only One" (1960)	"Travelin' Man" (1961)	"A Wonder Like You" / "Everlovin'" (1961)

"Travelin' Man" is an American popular song, best known as a 1961 hit single sung by Ricky Nelson. Singer-songwriter Jerry Fuller wrote it with Sam Cooke in mind, but Cooke's manager was unimpressed and did not keep the demo, which eventually wound up being passed along to Nelson. His version reached No. 1 on the Billboard Hot 100. It was released as a double A-side with "Hello Mary Lou", which reached No. 9 on the same chart. In the United Kingdom, "Travelin' Man", coupled with "Hello Mary Lou", reached No. 2, becoming Nelson's biggest UK hit. Nelson is accompanied on the recording by the vocal quartet, The Jordanaires.

== Plot ==
The song details the loves of a world traveler with an eye for beautiful women. Songwriter Fuller has described it as a "girl in every port" song. The women in each locale are referenced by a word or phrase associated with the location. The women were from: Mexico, Alaska, Berlin, Hong Kong, and Waikiki. There were others as well, "in every port ... at least one," mentioned obliquely during the opening verse. The song was produced by Joe Johnson who was also famous for The Champs recording of "Tequila". Joe was the owner of 4 Star Records and Challenge Records.

== Charts ==
=== Weekly charts ===
Chart (1961)	Peak position
Australia	1
Canada (CHUM Hit Parade)	1
New Zealand (Lever Hit Parade)	1
UK Singles Chart	2
US Billboard Hot 100	1
US Cash Box Top 100	1

=== Year-end charts ===
Chart (1961)	Rank
US Billboard Hot 100	23
US Cash Box Top 100	7

== Covers ==
- Clover on Love on the Wire (1978).
- A cover was released by Jacky Ward in 1982, reaching #32 on the US country chart.

== Uses in popular culture ==
- Nelson performed the song in the 1961 episode of The Adventures of Ozzie and Harriet entitled "A Question of Suits & Ties" (S09•E28).
- Neil Sedaka acknowledged using a portion of the melody and chord progression of "Travelin' Man" in his own song "Calendar Girl."
- Nelson's version appears in a 2019 TV commercial for the Toyota Corolla hybrid.
- In episode 5, season 4, of Stranger Things, Nelson's version is heard during Yuri's takeoff from the Yuri's Fish And Fly.
- In episode 8, season 3, of King of the Hill, Hank sings this song while shaving in the bathroom, before being interrupted by Bobby.

== See also ==
- List of Hot 100 number-one singles of 1961 (U.S.)
- The Wanderer (Dion song)
