= Hello Mary Lou =

Single by Ricky Nelson

from the album Rick Is 21
- A-side: "Travelin' Man"
- Released: May 1961
- Recorded: 1960−61
- Genre: Rockabilly; rock and roll; Country
- Length: 2:17
- Label: Imperial Records #5741
- Songwriters: Gene Pitney; Cayet Mangiaracina

Ricky Nelson singles chronology
"You Are the Only One" (1960)	"Hello Mary Lou" (1961)	"A Wonder Like You/Everlovin'" (1961)

Official audio
- "Hello Mary Lou" (Remastered) on YouTube

"Hello Mary Lou" (also known as Hello Mary Lou (Goodbye Heart)) is a song written by American singer Gene Pitney first recorded by Johnny Duncan in 1960 and by Ricky Nelson at United Western Recorders Studios on March 22, 1961.

Nelson's version, issued as a double A-side with his No. 1 hit "Travelin' Man", (Imperial 5741), reached No. 9 on the Billboard music charts on May 28, 1961. In the United Kingdom it reached No. 2. It was also a hit in much of Europe, particularly Norway, where it spent 14 weeks at No. 1, Denmark where it also peaked at No. 1, and in Sweden, where it spent five months in the best selling chart (July–December) and peaked at No. 2 during eight weeks. In New Zealand, the song reached No. 4.

A 1991 reissue following the song's use in a TV advertisement gave the song a second chart run, peaking at No. 45 in the UK Singles Chart.

The song features an influential guitar solo by James Burton, often cited by later guitarists such as Brian May. Piano is by Ray Johnson, who had succeeded Gene Garf as Nelson's regular session pianist in November 1959. Other musicians on the record include Joe Osborn on bass and Ritchie Frost on drums.

The song appears on Nelson's sixth album Rick Is 21 (1961).

Nelson performed the song on the 1961 episode of The Adventures of Ozzie and Harriet entitled "Selling Rick's Drums" (S09•E30).

== Plagiarism settlement ==
"Hello Mary Lou" is similar to an earlier song, "Merry, Merry Lou", written by Cayet Mangiaracina and recorded by his band, the Sparks, in 1957 on a single released by Decca Records. It was covered by Bill Haley & His Comets as "Mary, Mary Lou" and released as a single later in 1957, also by Decca, and by Sam Cooke in 1958 for the Keen Records label. Mangiaracina would later become ordained as a Catholic priest. When "Hello Mary Lou" was released, the publisher of "Merry, Merry Lou", Champion Music (an arm of Decca Records), sued for plagiarism and a settlement was reached. Mangiaracina was given co-writing credit for "Hello Mary Lou" and a share of the song's royalties, while Champion received a share of the publishing.

== Chart performance ==
Chart (1961)	Peak position
Belgium (Juke Box Magazine)	1
Canada (CHUM Hit Parade)	1
Denmark (Quan's Musikbureau)	1
Finland (Ilta-Sanomat)	1
Germany (Automaten-Markt)	1
Ireland (Dublin Herald)	1
Israel (Kol Yisrael)	4
Netherlands (Platennieuws)	1
New Zealand	4
Norway (Verdens Gang)	1
Sweden (Show Business Magazine)	2
UK Singles (OCC)	2
US Billboard Hot 100	9

== Cover versions ==
- The Brook Brothers released it as a single in the UK in 1961.
- Jan & Kjeld released a German language cover in 1961.
- Siw Malmkvist released a Swedish language cover in 1969, Lyckans ost (Lucky you), which peaked at No. 3 on the chart Svensktoppen in December that year.
- Bobby Lewis, in 1970. This version reached No. 14 on the Billboard Hot Country Singles chart.
- Creedence Clearwater Revival, in their 1972 album Mardi Gras.
- Led Zeppelin, in 1972, as part of their "Whole Lotta Love" medley, released in 2003 on How the West Was Won. It was removed from the 2018 remaster.
- The Statler Brothers in 1985, on their album Pardners in Rhyme.
- Queen played the song during their 1986 Magic Tour, as witnessed on their Live at Wembley '86 album.
- New Riders of the Purple Sage, in their 1972 album Powerglide
