= Born to Be Wild =

1968 song by Steppenwolf

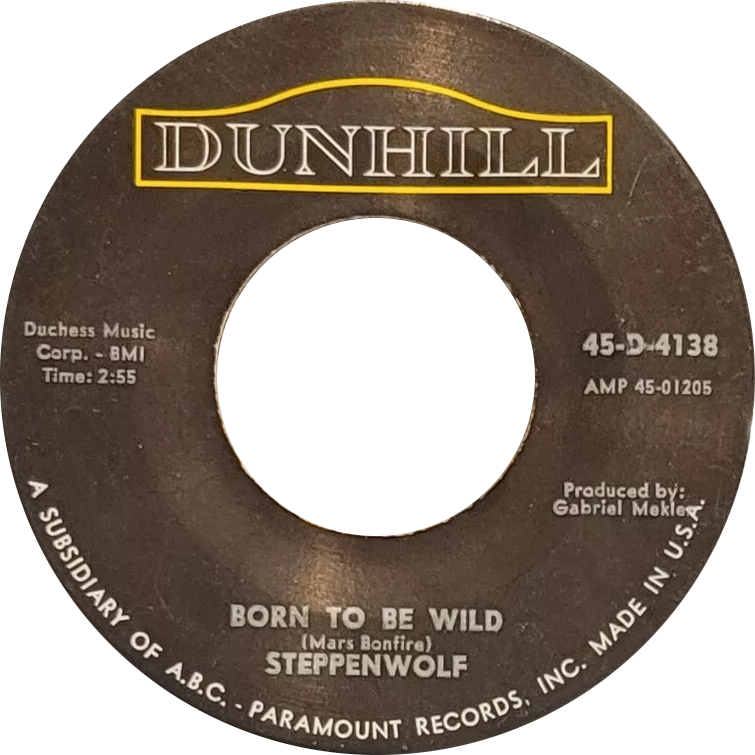
- One of side-A labels of the US single

Single by Steppenwolf

from the album Steppenwolf
- B-side: "Everybody's Next One"
- Released: 1968
- Genre: Hard rock; proto-metal
- Length: 3:28 (Album version); 2:55 (7-inch version)
- Label: Dunhill, RCA
- Songwriter: Mars Bonfire
- Producer: Gabriel Mekler

Steppenwolf singles chronology
"A Girl I Knew" (1967)	"Born to Be Wild" (1968)	"The Pusher" (1968)

Official audio
- "Born To Be Wild" on YouTube

"Born to Be Wild" is a song written by Mars Bonfire and first released as a single by Steppenwolf. Although the lyrics do not specifically mention motorcycles, the song is often invoked in both popular and counterculture to denote a biker appearance or attitude since being featured in the 1969 film Easy Rider. Sometimes, "Born to Be Wild" is described as the first heavy metal song, and the second-verse lyric "heavy metal thunder" marks the first use of this term in rock music (although not as a description of a musical style, but rather a motorcycle).

== Music and lyrics ==
Mars Bonfire wrote "Born to Be Wild" as a ballad. Bonfire was previously a member of the Sparrows, the predecessor band to Steppenwolf, and his brother was Steppenwolf's drummer. Although he initially offered the song to other bands — The Human Expression, for one — "Born to Be Wild" was first recorded by Steppenwolf in a sped-up and rearranged version that AllMusic's Hal Horowitz described as "a roaring anthem of turbo-charged riff rock" and "a timeless radio classic as well as a slice of '60s revolt that at once defines Steppenwolf's sound and provided them with their shot at AM immortality".

According to Classic Rock Magazine, the track was the first in history to incorporate the word "heavy metal" into its lyrics.

== Release and commercial performance ==
"Born to Be Wild" was Steppenwolf's third single off their self-titled debut album, and became their signature song, reaching number two on the Billboard Hot 100 singles charts. It was kept from the number-one spot by "People Got to Be Free" by the Rascals.

== Reception and legacy ==
In 2004, Rolling Stone placed "Born to Be Wild" at number 129 on its 500 Greatest Songs of All Time list. Also in 2004, it finished at number 29 on AFI's 100 Years...100 Songs survey of top tunes in American cinema. In 2009, it was named the 53rd-best hard rock song of all time by VH1 (It had ranked 40th in the 100 Greatest Songs of Rock and Roll by VH1 nine years earlier.). In 2018, the song was inducted into the Rock and Roll Hall of Fame in a new category for singles.

In 2021, staff writers at Classic Rock Magazine expressed the belief that "Born to Be Wild" is "probably the first real metal track."

== Personnel ==
Personnel taken from Mixonline.

- John Kay – vocals
- Michael Monarch – guitar
- Goldy McJohn – Lowrey organ
- Rushton Moreve – bass guitar
- Jerry Edmonton – drums

== Charts ==
=== Weekly charts ===
Chart (1968–1969)	Peak position
Austria (Ö3 Austria Top 40)	20
Belgium (Ultratop 50 Flanders)	16
Canada Top Singles (RPM)	1
Germany (GfK)	20
Netherlands (Dutch Top 40)	32
New Zealand (Listener)	13
UK Singles (Official Charts)	30
US Billboard Hot 100	2

Chart (1973)	Peak position
Netherlands (Dutch Top 40)	16
Netherlands (Single Top 100)	14

Chart (1990–1991)	Peak position
Belgium (Ultratop 50 Flanders)	20
Europe (Eurochart Hot 100)	79
Netherlands (Dutch Top 40)	4
Netherlands (Single Top 100)	5

Chart (1999)	Peak position
UK Singles (Official Charts)	18

=== Year-end charts ===
Chart (1968)	Position
Canada (RPM Top Singles)	14
US Billboard Hot 100	31

Chart (1990)	Position
Netherlands (Dutch Top 40)	47
Netherlands (Single Top 100)	57

== Certifications ==
Region	Certification	Certified units/sales
Denmark (IFPI Danmark)	Gold	45,000^{‡}
Germany (BVMI)	Gold	300,000^{‡}
Italy (FIMI)	Gold	25,000^{‡}
Spain (Promusicae)	Platinum	60,000^{‡}
United Kingdom (BPI)	Platinum	600,000^{‡}
United States (RIAA)	Gold	1,000,000^{^}
^{^} Shipments figures based on certification alone.^{‡} Sales+streaming figures based on certification alone.

== Cover versions ==
"Born to Be Wild"

Single by Kim Wilde
- B-side: "All About Me"
- Released: 2002
- Length: 3:23 (Radio Mix)
- Label: Edel
- Songwriter: Mars Bonfire
- Producer: Ricki Wilde

Kim Wilde singles chronology
"Loved" (2001)	"Born to Be Wild" (2002)	"Anyplace, Anywhere, Anytime" (2003)

Music video
- "Born to Be Wild" on YouTube

In 1985, the song was covered by Australian band Rose Tattoo. Their version peaked at number 25 in Australia. In 2002, it was covered by Kim Wilde and released as a nonalbum single. Her cover reached number 84 in Germany and number 71 in Switzerland. Belgian singer Tanja Dexters also covered the song in 2002. Her version peaked at number 21 in Belgium.

Other artists who covered this song include Hinder, Etta James, Link Wray, Slade, The Cult, INXS, Ozzy Osbourne with Miss Piggy, Bruce Springsteen, Slayer, Blue Öyster Cult, Status Quo, Fanfare Ciocărlia, Krokus, Wilson Pickett, and La Renga.

=== Charts ===
==== Rose Tattoo version ====
Chart (1985)	Peak position
Australia (Kent Music Report)	25

==== Kim Wilde version ====
Chart (2002)	Peak position
Germany (GfK)	84
Switzerland (Schweizer Hitparade)	71

==== Tanja Dexters version ====
Chart (2002)	Peak position
Belgium (Ultratop 50 Flanders)	21

== See also ==
- List of number-one singles of 1968 (Canada)
