= The New Gary Puckett and the Union Gap Album =

Studio album by Gary Puckett & The Union Gap
- Released: December 1969
- Genre: Rock
- Label: Columbia
- Producer: Dick Glasser

Gary Puckett & The Union Gap chronology
Incredible (1968)	The New Gary Puckett and the Union Gap Album (1969)	Gary Puckett & The Union Gap's Greatest Hits (1970)

The New Gary Puckett and the Union Gap Album is the fourth and final studio album by Gary Puckett & The Union Gap that contained all new material. It was released in 1969.

Their version of the song "Don't Give in to Him" was released in March 1969 and hit No. 15 on the Billboard Hot 100 and No. 13 on the easy listening chart. The song "This Girl Is a Woman Now" was released in August 1969 and hit No. 9 on the Billboard Hot 100 and No. 2 on the easy listening chart.

The album landed on the Billboard 200 chart, reaching #50.

The album was arranged by Ernie Freeman.

== Track listing ==
Side 1

1. "Home" (Mac Davis)
2. "Stay Out of My World" (Gary Geld, Peter Udell)
3. "Lullaby" (Gary Puckett)
4. "Hard Tomorrow" (Kerry Chater, Gary Withem)
5. "This Girl Is a Woman Now" (Alan Bernstein, Victor Millrose)

Side 2

1. "My Son (version 2)" (Withem, Chater)
2. "Simple Man" (Eddie Colville, Puckett)
3. "Out in the Cold Again" (Dick Monda, Keith Colley)
4. "Don't Give in to Him" (Gary Usher)
5. "His Other Woman" (Chater, Doug Allen)

== Chart positions ==
Chart (1969)	Peak position
US Billboard 200	50

Singles

Year	Single	Chart	Peak position
1969	"Don't Give In to Him"	Billboard Hot 100	15
1969	"Don't Give In to Him"	Billboard Adult Contemporary	13
1969	"This Girl Is a Woman Now"	Billboard Hot 100	9
1969	"This Girl Is a Woman Now"	Billboard Adult Contemporary	2
