= Young Girl (album) =

Studio album by Gary Puckett & The Union Gap
- Released: April 24, 1968
- Recorded: 1967
- Genre: Pop
- Label: Columbia
- Producer: Jerry Fuller

Gary Puckett & The Union Gap chronology
Woman, Woman (1968)	Young Girl (1968)	Incredible (1968)

Professional ratings
Review scores
Source	Rating
Allmusic	3/5 stars

Young Girl is the RIAA Gold-certified second studio album by Gary Puckett & The Union Gap, released in 1968.

The title track hit #1 on the Cash Box Top 100 and #2 on the Billboard Hot 100. It made it to #34 on the Adult Contemporary chart. The album landed on the Billboard album chart, reaching #21 and going Gold.

== Track listing ==
Side one
No.	Title	Writer(s)	Length
1.	"Young Girl"	Jerry Fuller	3:12
2.	"Lady Madonna"	John Lennon, Paul McCartney	2:14
3.	"Kiss Me Goodbye"	Les Reed, Barry Mason	3:35
4.	"The Pleasure of You"	Fuller, Gary Puckett	2:29
5.	"Dreams of the Everyday Housewife"	Chris Gantry	2:43
6.	"I'm Losing You"	Puckett, Fuller	2:30

Side two
No.	Title	Writer(s)	Length
1.	"Honey (I Miss You)"	Bobby Russell	4:12
2.	"The Mighty Quinn"	Bob Dylan	2:46
3.	"Wait Till The Sun Shines on You"	Kerry Chater	3:03
4.	"(Sweet, Sweet Baby) Since You've Been Gone"	Aretha Franklin, Teddy White	2:14
5.	"Say You Don't Need Me"	Fuller, Puckett	2:42

== Personnel ==
- Gary Puckett - lead vocals, guitar
- Kerry Chater - bass guitar, lead vocal on verses 1 and 2 of "Wait Till the Sun Shines on You"
- Gary "Mutha" Withem - organ, piano
- Dwight Bemont - tenor saxophone
- Paul Wheatbread - drums

== Chart positions ==
Album

Year	Chart	Peak Position
1968	Billboard 200	21

Singles

Year	Single	Chart	Peak Position
1968	"Young Girl"	Billboard Hot 100	2
1968	"Young Girl"	Adult Contemporary Chart	34
1968	"Young Girl"	United Kingdom	1
