= Next Plane to London =

Single by The Rose Garden

from the album The Rose Garden
- B-side: "Flower Town"
- Released: October 21, 1967
- Recorded: 1967
- Studio: Nashville West Studios, Hollywood, California
- Genre: Folk rock; pop
- Length: 2:32
- Label: Atco
- Songwriter: Kenny Gist Jr.
- Producers: Charlie Greene, Brian Stone

The Rose Garden singles chronology
"Next Plane to London" (1967)	"Here's Today" (1968)

"Next Plane to London" is the debut single by the American folk rock band the Rose Garden. The single, released by Atco Records, became the band's only Top 20 hit on the Billboard Hot 100 when it peaked at number 17. It would later reappear on the group's 1968 studio album, The Rose Garden. "Next Plane to London" made the Rose Garden one of the most memorable one-hit wonders of the late sixties.

A French-language adaptation was recorded in 1968 by Quebec singer Renée Martel "Je vais à Londres".

== History ==
The band's first incarnation was as the Blokes, a Byrds-inspired band. The Blokes recorded their own material, but became known for promoting a single by professional musicians who went under the name, The Giant Sunflower. The single, "February Sunshine", became a Los Angeles hit, and the Blokes became known as the Giant Sunflower for a couple of weeks to perform the song in their live act. The Blokes recorded demos with Charlie Greene, and Brian Stone when it was announced they needed a new name. As guitarist John Noreen states, "Everything was 'flower power' at that time, so The Rose Garden made sense". Under the new band name, the group recorded numerous demos in search of the one song to become their debut single. At first, their efforts appeared in vain until their promoter, Pat Pipolo, put managers Greene and Stone in contact with songwriter Kenny Gist Jr. His composition, "Next Plane to London", was chosen to be recorded as the A-side to the debut single.

=== Recording and release ===
Recording commenced in Nashville Recording Studios in Hollywood under a time-constrained schedule. Noreen was unable to create a guitar solo in time for recording, so Greene and Stone suggested that the signature "airport voice" be put in its place. Don Elliot, a program director for KBLA Radio, was brought in to record the voice on a Neumann microphone. The melodies were basic I–IV–V chord progressions with some minor chords in the refrain and bridges. Lead vocals were performed by Diana Di Rose, notable for her lower register, with James Groshong and Noreen joining for three-way harmonies. The overall style was reminiscent of Gene Clark, who offered the band two of his own compositions in their past demo recordings. Lyrically, the song narrates a story of a female-musician on her way to London in search of fame. On the way, she misses seeing her lover, whom she hopes does not get his heart broken from her departure. For the B-side, the band choose "Flower Town", which was a part of their early demos that was then re-recorded.

"Next Plane to London" b/w "Flower Town" entered the Hot 100 on October 21, 1967, at number 91. It first appeared on KBLA Radio, one of the earliest FM radio stations. More than two months later, on December 30, 1967, the single reached its peak position at number 17, the same day that the band lip-synced the two tracks from the record on American Bandstand. Following extensive touring in the Southwest, the song was featured as the opening track for the band's debut album, The Rose Garden. The album was released in April 1968.

A French cover version of the song ("Je vais à Londres") was released in Canada in 1968 by Renée Martel. There have been more recent covers of the Martel record by Annie Blanchard, Andrea Lindsay and Ariane Richard.

== Personnel ==
- Diana Di Rose - lead vocals, acoustic guitar
- John Noreen - lead 12-string guitar, backing vocals
- James Groshong - rhythm guitar, backing vocals
- William Fleming - bass guitar
- Bruce Bowdin - drums
- Don Elliot - "airport voice"

== Releases ==
=== Singles ===
- "Next Plane to London" b/w "Flower Town" - ATCO, #45-6510, 1967 (US)
- "Next Plane to London" b/w "Flower Town" - Atlantic, #H-251, 1967 (Spain)
- "Next Plane to London" b/w "Flower Town" - ATCO, #ATCO 6510X, 1967 (Canada) (#1 Weekly charts, #99 Year-end)
- "Next Plane to London" b/w "Flower Town" - Atlantic, #584163, 1968 (UK)
- "Next Plane to London" b/w "Flower Town" - Atlantic, #ATL 70 244, 1968 (Germany)

=== Albums/Compilations ===
- The Rose Garden - 1968
- Only Love 1965-1968 - 1997
- Lost Hits of the '60s - 1999
- Hard to Find 45's on CD, Vol. 5: '60s Pop Classics - 2000
- Buried Treasures: Lost Gems from Deep in the '60s Vaults - 2001
- Chartbusters, USA: Vol. 3 - 2003
