= Keep the Customer Satisfied (song) =

1970 song by Simon & Garfunkel

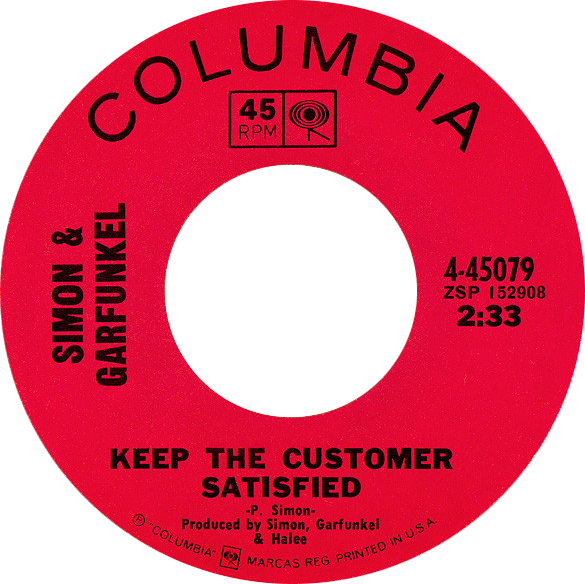
- Side B of the US single

Single by Simon & Garfunkel

from the album Bridge over Troubled Water
- A-side: "Bridge over Troubled Water"
- Released: January 26, 1970
- Recorded: 1969
- Genre: Rockabilly; folk rock
- Label: Columbia
- Songwriter: Paul Simon
- Producers: Roy Halee; Paul Simon; Art Garfunkel

"Keep the Customer Satisfied" is a song by American music duo Simon & Garfunkel from the group's fifth studio album, Bridge over Troubled Water (1970). It was included as the B-side of their signature hit, "Bridge over Troubled Water".

The label also promoted the song as an A-side on a special promo-only single with the album version of "America" as the B-side.

== Gary Puckett cover ==
"Keep the Customer Satisfied"
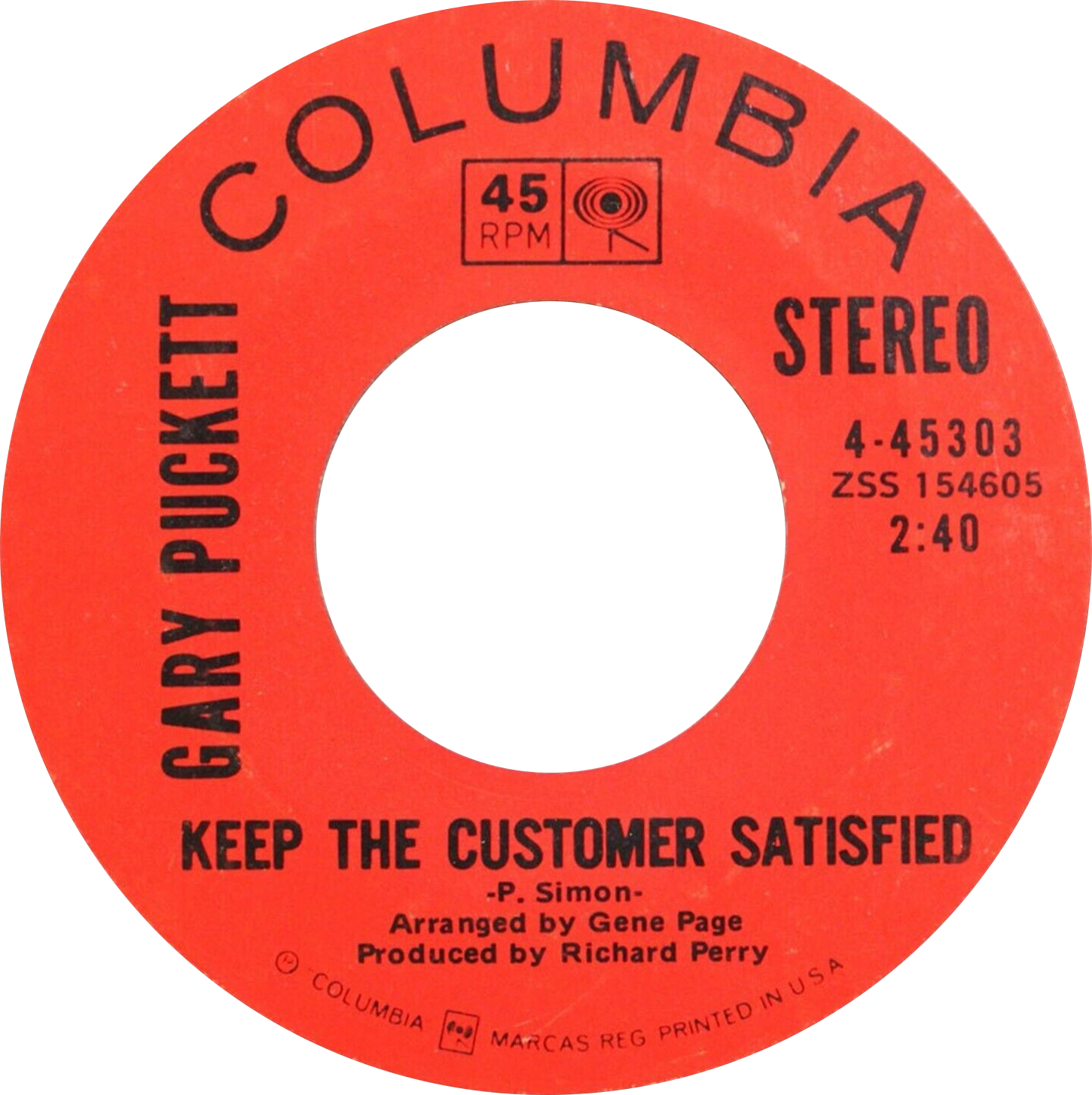
- Side A of the US single

Single by Gary Puckett

from the album The Gary Puckett Album
- B-side: "No One Really Knows"
- Released: January 1971
- Genre: Rock
- Length: 2:40
- Label: Columbia
- Songwriter: Paul Simon
- Producer: Richard Perry

Gary Puckett singles chronology
"I Just Don't Know What to Do with Myself" (1970)	"Keep the Customer Satisfied" (1971)	"Part Time Love" (1977)

"Keep the Customer Satisfied" was recorded by Gary Puckett for his solo LP, The Gary Puckett Album (1971), produced by Richard Perry. "Keep the Customer Satisfied" reached No. 71 on Billboard in the winter of 1971. It reached No. 50 on the Cash Box chart, and No. 38 in Canada.

== Chart performance ==
=== Puckett cover ===
Chart (1971)	Peak position
U.S. Billboard Hot 100	71
U.S. Cash Box Top 100	50
U.S. Billboard Easy Listening	28
Canada RPM Top Singles	38

=== Hunt cover ===
Chart (1970)	Peak position
UK	41

== Notable cover versions ==
- In the United Kingdom, the song charted at number 41 in February, 1970 as performed by Marsha Hunt.
- The Jamaican vocal duo Bob and Marcia performed the song on their 1970 album Young, Gifted and Black.
