= Incredible (Gary Puckett & The Union Gap album) =

Studio album by Gary Puckett & The Union Gap
- Released: October 9, 1968
- Genre: Rock
- Label: Columbia
- Producer: Jerry Fuller

Gary Puckett & The Union Gap chronology
Young Girl (1968)	Incredible (1968)	The New Gary Puckett and the Union Gap Album (1969)

Incredible is the third studio album by Gary Puckett & The Union Gap, released in 1968. In contrast to their first two albums, which used cover versions of hit songs for about half their content, Incredible consists entirely of new songs written by the band members themselves and/or their producer, Jerry Fuller. The album landed on the Billboard 200 chart, reaching No. 20, being the group's top charting album.

The song "Lady Willpower" was released in June 1968 and hit No. 2 on the Billboard Hot 100 and No. 26 on the adult contemporary chart. The song "Over You" was released in September 1968 and hit No. 7 on the Billboard Hot 100, No. 3 on the adult contemporary chart.

== Track listing ==
All songs arranged by Al Capps except where noted.

Side one
No.	Title	Writer(s)	Length
1.	"Over You"	Jerry Fuller	2:22
2.	"Now and Then"	Fuller, Gary Puckett	2:23
3.	"I'm Just a Man" (Arranged by Kerry Chater)	Gary Withem, Kerry Chater	2:06
4.	"The Common Cold"	Fuller, Puckett	3:12
5.	"Can You Tell" (Arranged by Kerry Chater)	Withem, Chater	2:57
6.	"If the Day Would Come"	Puckett, Chater, Withem	2:47

Side two
No.	Title	Writer(s)	Length
7.	"Lady Willpower"	Fuller	2:38
8.	"Reverend Posey" (Arranged by Kerry Chater and Al Capps)	Withem, Chater	3:42
9.	"Give In"	Fuller	2:11
10.	"Take Your Pleasure" (Arranged by Kerry Chater)	Withem, Chater	3:04
11.	"I've Done All I Can"	Fuller	2:22

== Personnel ==
Gary Puckett & The Union Gap

- Dwight Bement - tenor saxophone [uncredited], organ, piano, bass
- Kerry Chater - bass, backing vocals, lead vocal on "Take Your Pleasure", rhythm guitar
- Gary Puckett - lead vocals (except on "Take Your Pleasure"), lead and rhythm guitars
- Paul Wheatbread - drums, percussion
- Gary "Mutha" Withem - organ, piano, backing vocals, lead vocal on "Take Your Pleasure"

Additional personnel

- James Burton - rhythm guitar
- Al Casey - rhythm guitar
- Mort Marker - rhythm guitar
- Joe Porcaro - percussion
- Gene Estes - percussion
- Jerry Fuller - production
- Tom Morgan - harmonica
- Dorothy Remson - harp
- Gayle Levan - harp
- Sid Sharp - strings

== Chart positions ==
Chart (1968)	Peak position
US Billboard 200	20

Singles

Year	Single	Chart	Peak position
1968	"Lady Willpower"	US Billboard Hot 100	2
1968	"Lady Willpower"	US Easy Listening	26
1968	"Lady Willpower"	UK Singles Chart	5
1968	"Over You"	US Billboard Hot 100	7
1968	"Over You"	US Easy Listening	3
1968	"Over You"	UK Singles Chart	54
