= The Rose Garden (band) =

American folk rock band

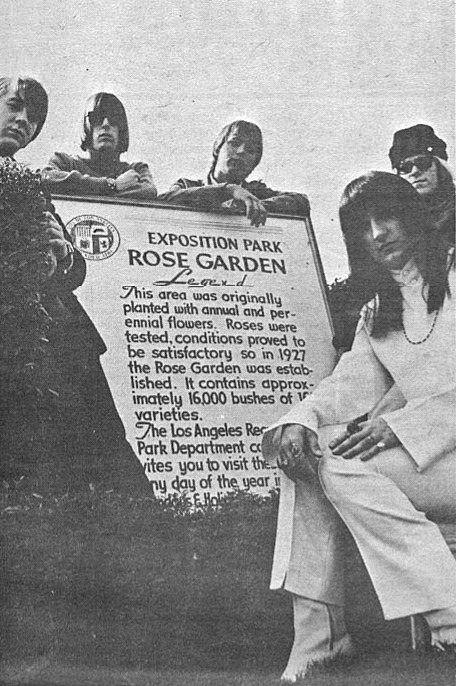

Background information
- Genres: folk rock
- Years active: 1967–1968
- Past members: Diana De Rose; John Noreen; James Groshong; William Fleming; Bruce Bowdin

The Rose Garden was an American folk rock band from Los Angeles, California, United States, active in 1967 and 1968. They are best remembered for their hit single "Next Plane to London".

The band formed from an earlier group known as The Blokes, which was founded in 1964 and had covered much of the Byrds work in its later years. By 1967, the group's full lineup was complete and they became known as The Rose Garden. The members were Diana De Rose (born July 29, 1946) on lead vocals and acoustic guitar, John Noreen on 12-string guitar and backup vocal, James Groshong on lead vocal and guitar, William Fleming on bass and Bruce Bowdin on drums.

In 1967, they signed with Atco Records and had a hit with "Next Plane To London" which reached number 17 on the Billboard Hot 100 chart, at the end of that year. They released their eponymous album in January 1968. Subsequent releases were unsuccessful, and dissension within the group (as well as two members who were drafted into the military) led to its breakup by the end of 1968.

== Discography ==
- The Rose Garden (1968)
