= This Girl Is a Woman Now =

- 1968 45rpm record label

Single by Gary Puckett & The Union Gap

from the album The New Gary Puckett and the Union Gap Album
- B-side: "His Other Woman"
- Released: August 1969
- Recorded: June 17, 1969
- Genre: Rock
- Length: 3:10
- Label: Columbia
- Songwriters: Victor Millrose, Alan Bernstein
- Producer: Dick Glasser

Gary Puckett & The Union Gap singles chronology
"Don't Give In to Him" (1969)	"This Girl Is a Woman Now" (1969)	"Let's Give Adam and Eve Another Chance" (1970)

"This Girl Is a Woman Now" is a song written by Victor Millrose and Alan Bernstein and was recorded by Gary Puckett & The Union Gap for their 1969 album The New Gary Puckett and the Union Gap Album.

The song peaked at No. 2 on the US Easy Listening chart and No. 9 on the US Billboard Hot 100 the week of October 11, 1969. It also reached No. 5 on the Cash Box Top 100. It reached No. 3 in Canada and No. 13 in Australia.

== Chart performance ==
=== Weekly charts ===
Chart (1969)	Peak position
Australia (Go-Set)	13
Canada RPM Top Singles	4
Canada RPM Adult Contemporary	3
US Billboard Hot 100	9
US Billboard Adult Contemporary	2
US Cash Box Top 100	5
US Record World	3

=== Year-end charts ===
Chart (1969)	Rank
Canada	69
US Billboard Hot 100	84

== Cover versions ==
- In 1970, a version by Nancy Wilson reached No. 32 on Billboard's easy listening singles chart.

== Spanish cover version ==
- Nino Bravo released a Spanish cover of the song in 1972 called "La Niña Es Ya Mujer."
