= Don't Give In to Him =

- 1969 45rpm dust cover

Single by Gary Puckett & The Union Gap

from the album The New Gary Puckett and the Union Gap Album
- B-side: "Could I"
- Released: March 1969
- Recorded: February 3, 1969
- Genre: Rock
- Length: 2:15
- Label: Columbia
- Songwriter: Gary Usher
- Producer: Dick Glasser

Gary Puckett & The Union Gap singles chronology
"Over You" (1968)	"Don't Give In to Him" (1969)	"This Girl Is a Woman Now" (1969)

"Don't Give In to Him" is a song written by Gary Usher, produced by Dick Glasser and recorded by Gary Puckett & The Union Gap for their 1969 album, The New Gary Puckett and the Union Gap Album.

== Chart performance ==
The song reached #15 in the US, #4 in Canada and #24 in Australia in 1969.

== Cover Versions ==
- The Ventures released a cover of the song on their 1969 album, Hawaii Five-O.
