= Gary Puckett & The Union Gap =

United States pop rock act

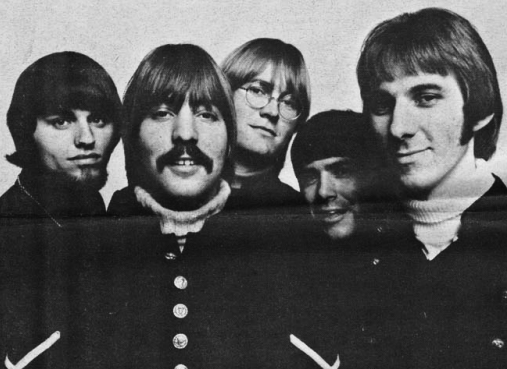
- The Union Gap in 1968. From left; Kerry Chater, Paul Wheatbread, Gary "Mutha" Withem, Dwight Bement, Gary Puckett.

Background information
- Also known as: The Union Gap featuring Gary Puckett
- Origin: San Diego, California, U.S.
- Genres: Pop
- Years active: 1967–1971
- Label: Columbia
- Past members: Gary Puckett; Kerry Chater; Gary Withem; Dwight Bement; Paul Wheatbread; Barry McCoy; Richard Gabriel
- Website: garypuckettmusic.com

Gary Puckett & The Union Gap (initially credited as The Union Gap featuring Gary Puckett) was an American pop rock group active in the late 1960s. The group, formed by Gary Puckett, Gary "Mutha" Withem, Dwight Bement, Kerry Chater and Paul Wheatbread, who eventually named it The Union Gap, had its biggest hits with "Woman, Woman", "Young Girl", "Lady Willpower", "Over You", "Don't Give In to Him", and "This Girl Is a Woman Now". The members featured costumes that were based on the Union Army uniforms worn during the American Civil War. Jerry Fuller gave the act a recording contract with Columbia Records. The group eventually grew unhappy with doing material written and produced by others, leading them to stop working with Fuller. The band eventually disbanded, and Puckett went on to do both solo work and collaborations.

== History ==
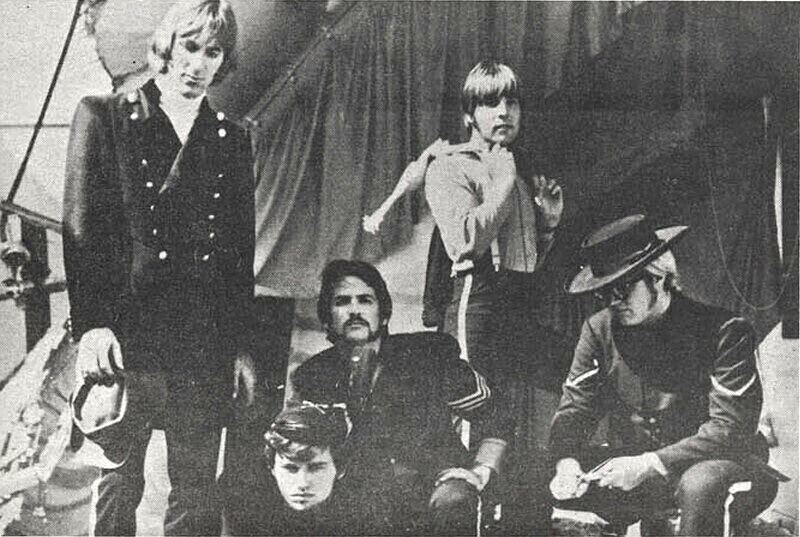
Gary Puckett and the Union Gap c. early 1968

The group's lead singer, Gary Puckett, was born on October 17, 1942, in Hibbing, Minnesota, and grew up in Yakima, Washington – close to Union Gap – and Twin Falls, Idaho. He began playing guitar in his teens, graduated from Twin Falls High School in 1960, and attended college in San Diego, California. There, he dropped out of college and played in several local bands before joining the Outcasts, a local hard rock group, which produced two singles, but they were unsuccessful.

Following the breakup of the Outcasts, Puckett formed a new group he called Gary and the Remarkables, comprising bassist Kerry Chater (born in Vancouver, British Columbia, Canada; August 7, 1945 – February 4, 2022), keyboardist Gary 'Mutha' Withem (born August 22, 1944, San Diego), tenor saxophonist Dwight Bement (born December 28, 1945, San Diego), and drummer Paul Wheatbread (born in San Diego; February 8, 1946 – July 6, 2026).

In 1966, the band toured the Pacific Northwest without Wheatbread, who was recruited as the house drummer on the television series Where the Action Is; he later rejoined the line-up. Under manager Dick Badger, the team was renamed The Union Gap in early 1967, and its members outfitted themselves in Union Army-style Civil War uniforms as a visual gimmick. They then recorded a demo, which was heard by CBS record producer and songwriter Jerry Fuller. Impressed by Puckett's tenor voice and the band's soft rock leanings, Fuller signed them to a recording contract with Columbia Records.

The band recorded their first single "Woman, Woman", a song about a man's fears that his female partner might be considering infidelity, that had been written and composed by Jim Glaser and Jimmy Payne, in August 1967. It became their first hit, reaching No. 3 in Cashbox and No. 4 on the Billboard Hot 100 chart. It was quickly certified as a million-selling Gold disc.

This was followed during the next two years by "Young Girl" (No. 1 in Cashbox, No. 2 in Billboard), "Lady Willpower" (No. 1 in Cashbox, No. 2 in Billboard), "Over You" (No. 5 in Cashbox, No. 7 in Billboard), and "Don't Give in to Him" (No. 15). All except "Don't Give in to Him" were produced by Fuller, who also wrote and composed "Young Girl", "Lady Willpower" and "Over You". Although the band never had a Billboard No. 1 record in the United States, "Young Girl" hit No. 1 on the UK singles chart for four weeks in May/June 1968. "Young Girl" was the second million-selling disc for the band, which it reached less than two months after issue; "Lady Willpower" and "Over You" also won gold discs. The band headlined at a White House reception for Prince Charles and Princess Anne and at Disneyland in 1968, and was nominated for a Grammy Award for Best New Artist in 1969, losing out to José Feliciano.

The band, however, wanted to write and produce its own material, and Puckett resented singing the ballads written by Fuller. In 1969 Fuller prepared a 40-piece studio orchestra to record a new song he had written, but Puckett and the group refused to record it, the session was canceled, and Fuller never again worked with the group. The band returned to the charts with "This Girl Is a Woman Now", produced by Dick Glasser, but later releases failed to make the Billboard Top 40. Chater and Withem left the band; Bement took over on bass guitar while keyboardist Barry McCoy and horn player Richard Gabriel were added. In 1970 Puckett began recording as a solo act, but with limited success; the Union Gap remained his live backing band until they were dismissed following an appearance at the 1971 Orange County Fair. Puckett's recording contract was terminated one year later.

== Solo careers and personal lives ==
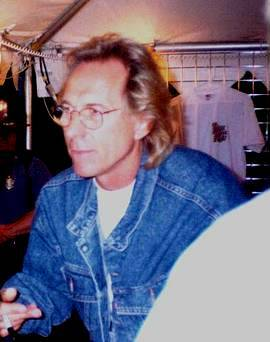
Gary Puckett in Boston, circa 2005

After the Union Gap was disbanded, Puckett had modest success as a solo artist with the 1971 album The Gary Puckett Album, on Columbia, and later mostly performing and re-recording the band's songs. By 1973, he had essentially disappeared from music, opting instead to study acting and dance and performing in theatrical productions in and around Los Angeles. A comeback tour engineered by music writer Thomas K. Arnold brought him to Las Vegas, Nevada in 1981, and from that point on he became a regular on the national oldies circuit. Puckett was on the bill for the first major Monkees reunion tour in 1986, along with The Grass Roots featuring Rob Grill and the current version of Herman's Hermits (minus Peter Noone). He also released some new material, including a 2001 holiday album entitled Gary Puckett at Christmas. In 1994 and 2002 Puckett performed at the Moondance Jam near Walker, Minnesota. As of 2010, Puckett continued to perform live concerts in venues across the US, including oldies circuit tours with the Association and the Lettermen. On June 20, 2010, Puckett performed for the first time in Union Gap, Washington, the namesake city of his former band.

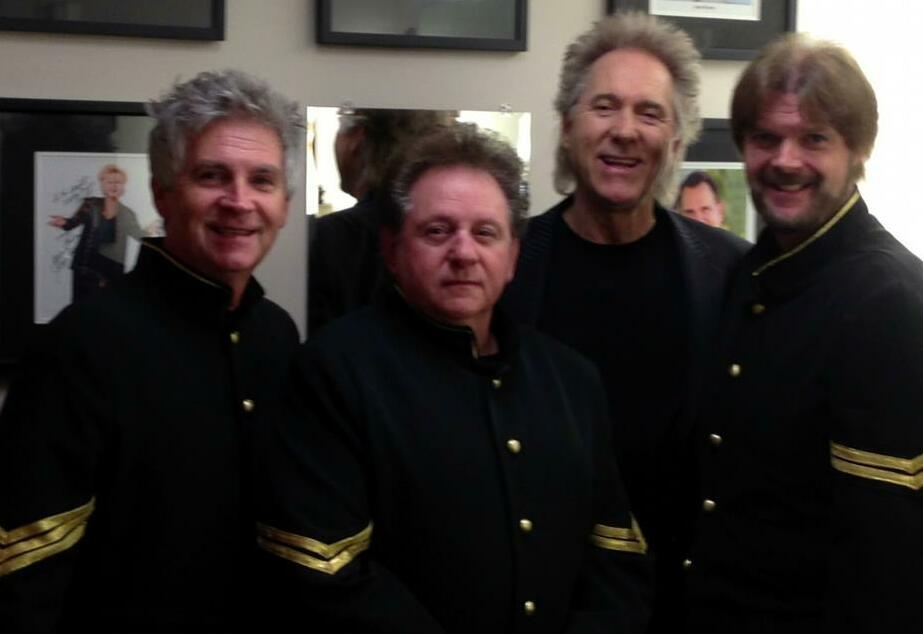
The Union Gap, ca. 2012

Puckett is married to Lorrie Haines. He has two step-daughters, Sydney and Michaela from Lorrie's previous mariage; they currently reside in Clearwater, Florida. Bement later joined the oldies act Flash Cadillac & the Continental Kids. Chater moved to Nashville, Tennessee where he worked as a songwriter, and had a minor solo hit in 1977 with the song "Part Time Love" and the albums Part Time Love (1977) and Love on a Shoestring (1978). Wheatbread turned to concert promotion, and Withem returned to San Diego to teach high-school band.

Paul Wheatbread died from complications of kidney failure and Alzheimer's disease on July 6, 2026, at the age of 80.

Puckett's current band lineup, still known as Gary Puckett and the Union Gap, is Woody Lingle (bass and vocals), Jamie Hilboldt (keyboards and vocals) and Mike Candito (drums and vocals).

== Members ==
Classic line-up

- Gary Puckett – lead vocals, guitar (1967–1971)
- Dwight Bement – brass instruments (1967–1969), bass (1969–1971)
- Kerry Chater – bass (1967–1969; died 2022)
- Gary "Mutha" Withem – keyboards (1967–1969)
- Paul Wheatbread – drums (1967–1969; died 2026)

Later members

- Barry McCoy – keyboards (1969–1971)
- Richard Gabriel – brass instruments (1969–1971)

== Discography ==
=== Singles ===
| Year | (A-Side) (Songwriters) | B-Side (Songwriters) | Chart Positions | | | | |
| Year | (A-Side) (Songwriters) | B-Side (Songwriters) | US | US AC | CAN | UK | AUS |
|---|---|---|---|---|---|---|---|
| November 1967 † | "Woman, Woman" (Jim Glaser, Jimmy Payne) | "Don't Make Promises" (Tim Hardin) | 4 | - | 1 | 48 | 6 |
| March 1968 † | "Young Girl" (Jerry Fuller) | "I'm Losing You" (Jerry Fuller, Gary Puckett) | 2 | 34 | 1 | 1 | 2 |
| June 1968 ‡ | "Lady Willpower" (Jerry Fuller) | "Daylight Stranger" (Jerry Fuller, Gary Puckett) | 2 | 26 | 1 | 5 | 4 |
| September 1968 ‡ | "Over You" (Jerry Fuller) | "If The Day Would Come" (Kerry Chater, Gary Puckett, Gary Withem) | 7 | 3 | 5 | 54 (Note: Chart position is from the official UK "Breakers List".) | 8 |
| March 1969 ‡ | "Don't Give In to Him" (Gary Usher) | "Could I" (Jerry Fuller, Gary Puckett) | 15 | 13 | 4 | - | 24 |
| August 1969 ‡ | "This Girl Is a Woman Now" (Victor Millrose, Alan Bernstein) | "His Other Woman" (D. Allen, Kerry Chater) | 9 | 2 | 4 | - | 16 |
| March 1970 ‡ | "Let's Give Adam and Eve Another Chance" (Richard Mainegra, Red West) | "The Beggar" (E. Colville, Gary Puckett) | 41 | 16 | 36 | - | - |

Re-releases

| Year | Single | Chart Position |
| Year | Single | UK |
|---|---|---|
| June 1974 ‡ | "Young Girl" (CBS UK re-release) | 6 |

† – Billed as The Union Gap featuring Gary Puckett
‡ – Billed as Gary Puckett & The Union Gap

Gary Puckett solo

- "I Just Don't Know What to Do with Myself" (US Billboard No. 61, US AC No. 14, CAN No. 40) / "All That Matters" – Columbia 45249 – October 1970
- "Keep the Customer Satisfied" (US Billboard No. 71, US AC No. 28, CAN No. 38) / "No One Really Knows" – Columbia 45303 – February 1971
- "Life Has Its Little Ups and Downs" (US AC No. 24) / "Shimmering Eyes" – Columbia 45358 – 1971
- "Gentle Woman" (US Record World No. 109) / "Hello Morning" – Columbia 45438 – 1971
- "I Can't Hold On" / "Hello Morning" – Columbia 45509 – 1971
- "Leavin' In The Morning" (US Record World No. 140) / "Bless This Child" – Columbia 45678 – 1972

Kerry Chater solo

- "Part Time Love" (US Billboard No. 97) / "No Love on the Black Keys" – Warner 8310 – March 1977

=== Albums ===
| Month and Year | Album title | Chart Positions | |
| Month and Year | Album title | US | AUS |
|---|---|---|---|
| February 1968 † | Woman, Woman | 22 | - |
| May 1968 ‡ | Gary Puckett & The Union Gap Featuring "Young Girl" | 21 | - |
| November 1968 ‡ | Incredible | 20 | - |
| December 1969 ‡ | The New Gary Puckett and the Union Gap Album | 50 | - |
| June 1970 ‡ | Gary Puckett & The Union Gap's Greatest Hits | 50 | - |
| 1981 ‡ | The Best of Gary Puckett & The Union Gap | - | 32 |

† – Billed as The Union Gap featuring Gary Puckett
‡ – Billed as Gary Puckett & The Union Gap

Gary Puckett solo

- The Gary Puckett Album (No. 196) – Columbia C-30862 – October 1971
- Melodie - 51 West Q16287 - 1982
- This Is Love - 2006

== See also ==
- List of artists who reached number one on the UK Singles Chart
- List of acts who appeared on American Bandstand
- List of Columbia Records artists
