= Over You (Gary Puckett & The Union Gap song) =

- 1968 45 rpm dust cover

Single by Gary Puckett & The Union Gap

from the album Incredible
- B-side: "If the Day Would Come"
- Released: September 1968
- Recorded: July 19, 1968
- Genre: Pop, adult contemporary
- Length: 2:25
- Label: Columbia
- Songwriter: Jerry Fuller
- Producer: Jerry Fuller

Gary Puckett & The Union Gap singles chronology
"Lady Willpower" (1968)	"Over You" (1968)	"Don't Give In to Him" (1969)

"Over You" is a song written and composed by Jerry Fuller and recorded by Gary Puckett & The Union Gap for their 1968 album, Incredible.

== Song background ==
The selection was the group's fourth consecutive million-selling Gold-certified single to have been produced, composed, and written by Jerry Fuller. It received a Gold disc from the RIAA in December 1968. Al Capps drafted the arrangements for the stringed instruments played on the recording.

== Chart performance ==
In the US, the song reached No. 7 on the Billboard Hot 100 chart in late 1968, it peaked at No. 3 on the Adult Contemporary chart, and reached No. 5 in Cash Box as well. Outside the US "Over You" was an international success, reaching No. 5 in Canada, No. 6 in Australia, and No. 17 in New Zealand. It ranked No. 41 on the US Cashbox chart Top 100 Hits of 1968.
