= Jim Glaser =

American country music artist (1937–2019)

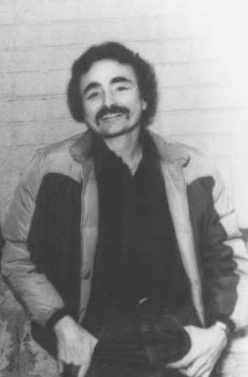
- Glaser in 1980

Background information
- Birth name: James William Glaser
- Born: December 16, 1937; Spalding, Nebraska, U.S.
- Died: April 6, 2019 (aged 81); Murfreesboro, Tennessee, U.S.
- Genres: Country
- Occupation: Singer
- Instrument(s): Vocals, guitar
- Years active: 1959–2019
- Labels: RCA Victor; MGM/Curb; MCA/Noble Vision; Solitaire
- Formerly of: Tompall & the Glaser Brothers

James William Glaser (December 16, 1937 – April 6, 2019) was an American country music artist. He was born in Spalding, Nebraska.

== Biography ==
The brother of country singers Chuck and Tompall Glaser, he performed as both a solo artist and alongside his two brothers in the group Tompall and the Glaser Brothers. His early career as a backup vocalist included a long stint with singer/songwriter Marty Robbins. Shortly before beginning his solo recording career, he had two major hits as songwriter in 1964, the top-five "What Does It Take", which was recorded by Skeeter Davis and the top-40 "Thanks a Lot for Tryin' Anyway" recorded by Liz Anderson and later covered in albums by Jan Howard and Connie Smith. His biggest songwriting success was "Woman, Woman" a number-four pop hit recorded by Gary Puckett & The Union Gap in 1967, and charting again for Glaser himself in 1975.

As a solo artist, Jim Glaser recorded four studio albums, and charted several singles on the Hot Country Songs charts, including the number-one hit "You're Gettin' to Me Again". Of the three brothers, he was the only one to have a number-one hit. He was selected by the Academy of Country Music as Best New Male Vocalist in 1984. In 1979, he recorded the first version of the song "Who Were You Thinkin' Of," which he co-wrote with Cathie Pelletier and Paul Gauvin; it was later recorded by the Texas Tornados, among others.

Glaser died of a heart attack on April 6, 2019, at the age of 81.

== Discography ==
Studio albums

Year	Title	Chart Positions	Label
Year	Title	US Country	Label
1983	Man in the Mirror	16	Noble Vision
1984	Past the Point of No Return	40	Noble Vision
1985	Everybody Knows I'm Yours	49	Noble Vision
2004	Me and My Dream		Solitaire

=== Singles ===
Year	Song	Chart Positions		Album
Year	Song	US Country	CAN Country	Album
1968	"God Help You Woman"	32	24	singles only
1969	"Please Take Me Back"	40	—	singles only
1969	"I'm Not Through Loving You"	52	—	singles only
1969	"Molly"	53	—	singles only
1973	"I See His Love All Over You"	67	—	singles only
1974	"Fool Passin' Through"	68	—	singles only
1974	"Forgettin' 'Bout You"	51	—	singles only
1975	"One, Two, Three (Never Gonna Fall in Love Again)"	88	—	singles only
1975	"Woman, Woman"	43	46	singles only
1976	"She's Free But She's Not Easy"	66	—	singles only
1977	"Chasin' My Tail"	88	—	singles only
1977	"Don't Let My Love Stand in Your Way"	86	—	singles only
1983	"When You're Not a Lady"	16	—	The Man in the Mirror
1983	"You Got Me Running"	28	—	The Man in the Mirror
1983	"The Man in the Mirror"	17	—	The Man in the Mirror
1984	"If I Could Only Dance with You"	10	10	The Man in the Mirror
1984	"You're Gettin' to Me Again"	1	3	The Man in the Mirror
1984	"Let Me Down Easy"	16	33	The Man in the Mirror
1985	"I'll Be Your Fool Tonight"	54	—	Past the Point of No Return
1985	"In Another Minute"	27	—	Past the Point of No Return
1986	"If I Don't Love You"	53	—	Past the Point of No Return
1986	"The Lights of Albuquerque"	40	—	Everybody Knows I'm Yours

== Awards and nominations ==
Year	Organization	Award	Nominee/Work	Result
1984	Academy of Country Music Awards	Top New Male Vocalist	Jim Glaser	Won
