= Lady Willpower =

- 1968 45 rpm record jacket

Single by Gary Puckett & The Union Gap

from the album Incredible
- B-side: "Daylight Stranger"
- Released: June 1968
- Recorded: April 9, 1968
- Genre: Pop
- Length: 2:48
- Label: Columbia
- Songwriter: Jerry Fuller

Gary Puckett & The Union Gap singles chronology
"Young Girl" (1968)	"Lady Willpower" (1968)	"Over You" (1968)

"Lady Willpower" is a song written by Jerry Fuller and recorded by Gary Puckett & The Union Gap for their 1968 album Incredible. The single was awarded a million-selling Gold disc from the RIAA.

== Chart performance ==
In the US, the song ranked among Cash Box Top 100 of 1968, where it hit the No. 1 position the week ending August 3, 1968. "Lady Willpower" reached No. 2 on the Billboard Hot 100 in 1968 (behind "Grazing in the Grass" by Hugh Masekela). and reached No. 26 on the Easy Listening chart. The song was the No. 34 song on the Billboard Year-End Hot 100 singles in 1968. In Canada it was No. 1 for 4 weeks.

"Lady Willpower" reached No. 5 on the UK Singles Chart in 1968. The song also peaked at #4 on the Kent Music Report (KMR) Chart in Australia, spending 16 weeks on the KMR Top-100 after entering the chart on 22 June 1968. On the New Zealand Listener charts it reached number 3.

== Other versions ==
Morrissey recorded his version of the song and included it on his 2019 album, California Son.
