= Don't Make Promises =

1966 song by Tim Hardin

Song by Tim Hardin

from the album Tim Hardin 1
- Released: 1966
- Label: Verve
- Songwriter: Tim Hardin
- Producer: Erik Jacobsen

"Don’t Make Promises" was the first track on Tim Hardin's debut album Tim Hardin 1, released in 1966. The song, along with "Reason to Believe," was one of the two major songwriting hits from the album, with more than a dozen cover versions having been recorded following its release. British radio presenter and writer Charlie Gillett noted the song's ability to achieve "the elusive balance between personal miseries and universal sufferings," while author Mark Brend praised the song's "fragile pop sensibilities" and how it contrasted with the "swaggering" R&B of album track "Ain't Gonna Do Without."

== The Beau Brummels version ==
"Don't Make Promises"

Single by The Beau Brummels
- A-side: "Two Days 'Til Tomorrow"
- Released: March 1967
- Genre: Folk rock
- Length: 2:30
- Label: Warner Bros. 7014
- Songwriter: Tim Hardin
- Producer: Lenny Waronker

The Beau Brummels singles chronology
"Here We Are Again" (1966)	"Don't Make Promises" (1967)	"Lower Level" / "Magic Hollow" (1967)

The Beau Brummels released a cover version of "Don't Make Promises" as a single in 1967. The song later appeared on the band's 1987 compilation album The Best of The Beau Brummels 1964–1968. The single's B-side, "Two Days 'Til Tomorrow," was a favorite of lead vocalist Sal Valentino, who called it the band's "greatest" song. It was included on the 2007 compilation album Love Is the Song We Sing: San Francisco Nuggets 1965–1970, and was called a "sublime bit of pop drama" by Pitchfork Media music critic Joe Tangari.

== Other versions ==
Bobby Darin included "Don't Make Promises", as well as four other Tim Hardin songs, on Darin's 1966 If I Were a Carpenter album. In 1967, the song was covered by Marianne Faithfull, Scott McKenzie, Rick Nelson, and Gary Lewis & the Playboys. Later versions were performed by Cliff Richard (1967) on Don't Stop Me Now!, Gary Puckett & The Union Gap as the B-side to "Woman, Woman" (1968), Three Dog Night (1968), Circus (1969), Z. Z. Hill (1969), Helen Reddy (1971), Joan Baez (1995), Chris Smither (1999), Paul Weller (2004), and The Kingston Trio, whose version was recorded in 1967 but remained unreleased until it appeared on the 2007 compilation album, The Lost 1967 Album: Rarities, Vol. 1. Dave Alvin recorded the song for his 2009 release Dave Alvin and the Guilty Women.
