= Woman, Woman =

- 1968 45rpm picture sleeve

Single by Gary Puckett & The Union Gap

from the album Woman, Woman
- B-side: "Don't Make Promises"
- Released: 19 September 1967
- Recorded: August 16, 1967
- Genre: Pop
- Length: 3:17
- Label: Columbia 44297
- Songwriters: Jim Glaser, Jimmy Payne
- Producer: Jerry Fuller

Gary Puckett & The Union Gap singles chronology
"Woman, Woman" (1967)	"Young Girl" (1968)

"Woman, Woman" is the debut single by Gary Puckett & The Union Gap, from their 1968 debut album Woman, Woman. It was written and composed by Jim Glaser and Jimmy Payne, and uses session musicians from The Wrecking Crew. Like most of the band's hits, it is a ballad centered around Gary Puckett's soulful vocals. The lyrics are from the perspective of a man who senses that his wife is dissatisfied with him sexually, and fears that she is going to start cheating on him. The song was inspired by Jim Glaser and Mel Tillis discussing Tillis' song Ruby, Don't Take Your Love To Town. The song went to number 3 on Cash Box and number 4 on the Billboard Hot 100 in early 1968.

The band recorded the song in August 1967, and it was released as their debut single in September. It was certified as a million-selling Gold disc in February 1968. The B-side was a cover of the Tim Hardin song "Don't Make Promises."

An international success, the song went to number 1 in Canada in 1967 and also reached number 7 in Australia. On the New Zealand Listener chart it peaked at number 10. In the UK, the song peaked at number 48 in 1968.

== Cover versions ==
- Richard Barnes released a version of the song as a single in the UK in 1968, but it did not chart.
- Glen Campbell released a cover version of the song on his 1968 album, Hey Little One.
- Jim Glaser, who co-wrote the song, released it as a single in 1975, taking it to number 43 on the Hot Country Singles chart. It later appeared on his 1983 album, The Man in the Mirror.
- Lloyd Green released a cover version of the song on his 1968 album, Mr. Nashville Sound.
- Ted Heath
- The Lettermen released a cover version of the song on their 1968 album, Put Your Head on My Shoulder.
