= Young Girl (song) =

- 1968 45rpm record label

Single by Gary Puckett & The Union Gap

from the album Young Girl
- B-side: "I'm Losing You"
- Released: March 1968
- Recorded: January 9, 1968
- Genre: Pop
- Length: 3:16
- Label: Columbia
- Songwriter: Jerry Fuller
- Producer: Jerry Fuller

Gary Puckett & The Union Gap singles chronology
"Woman, Woman" (1967)	"Young Girl" (1968)	"Lady Willpower" (1968)

"Young Girl" is a RIAA million-selling Gold-certified single that was written, composed, and produced by Jerry Fuller and performed by Gary Puckett & The Union Gap with instrumental backing by members of "The Wrecking Crew". It was released in 1968.

The song hit No. 2 on the Billboard Hot 100 for three weeks, stuck behind "(Sittin' On) The Dock of the Bay" by Otis Redding for the first week and "Honey" by Bobby Goldsboro for the remaining two. It also reached No. 1 on the UK Singles Chart and the US Cash Box listing. It made No. 34 on the US Easy Listening. It climbed to No. 2 in South Africa.

In the UK, "Young Girl" was re-released in 1974 as part of a CBS Records series entitled "Hall of Fame Hits", and enjoyed a second UK chart run, peaking at No. 6.

== Lyrics ==
The song, written by Jerry Fuller, is delivered from the point of view of a man who has become distressed upon finding out that the girl he is with, contrary to the first impression she had made upon him, is actually younger than the legal age of consent. He is asking her to leave before things go any further: "Get out of here / before I have the time / to change my mind / 'cause I'm afraid we'll go too far".

== Controversy ==
The controversy over the lyrics erupted immediately. Some US radio stations refused to give it airtime and Ed Sullivan insisted that the line 'I'm afraid we'll go too far' be changed to 'How can this love of ours go on' before he would allow it on his television show.

Gary Puckett and writer Jerry Fuller have defended the track, insisting it was meant as a warning rather than a celebration of inappropriate behavior. Puckett stated in interviews that the song describes an upstanding protagonist who recognizes the moral boundary and immediately ends the interaction upon discovering the girl's age.

== Chart history ==
=== Weekly charts ===
Chart (1968)	Peak position
Australia	2
Canada RPM Top Singles	1
Ireland (IRMA)	1
New Zealand (Listener)	1
South Africa (Springbok Radio)	2
UK (OCC)	1
U.S. Billboard Hot 100	2
U.S. Billboard Adult Contemporary	34
U.S. Cash Box Top 100	1

Chart (1974)	Peak position
UK (OCC)	6

=== Year-end charts ===
Chart (1968)	Rank
Canada	4
U.S. Billboard Hot 100	15
U.S. Cash Box	3
