= Jerry Fuller =

American songwriter (1938–2024)

- Birth name: Jerrell Lee Fuller
- Born: November 19, 1938; Fort Worth, Texas, U.S.
- Died: July 18, 2024 (aged 85); Los Angeles, California, U.S.
- Genres: Country, pop, doo-wop, soul
- Occupations: Songwriter, record producer
- Years active: 1959–2018
- Labels: Challenge Records, Columbia
- Spouse: Annette Smerigan (m. 1965)

Jerrell Lee Fuller (November 19, 1938 – July 18, 2024) was an American songwriter, singer, and record producer, best known for writing several hit songs in the 1960s. Fuller toured as a featured singer with The Champs before leaving to serve in the Army. Fuller's version of "Tennessee Waltz" made No. 63 on the Billboard Hot 100, and earned him an invitation to appear on American Bandstand. Fuller wrote for Ricky Nelson, who had top hits with "Travelin' Man", "A Wonder Like You", "Young World", and "It's Up to You". From 1967-1971, Fuller worked as a music producer at Columbia Records and, in 1970, he started his own Moonchild production company.

== Early life and career ==
Jerrell Lee Fuller was born in Fort Worth, Texas on November 19, 1938, to a musical family. He and his brother Bill performed as a duo in their home state, recording for the local Lin label, before Jerry branched out on his own and began writing his own material. In 1959, he moved to Los Angeles, California, and secured a performing contract with Challenge Records.

== Career ==
=== Singer/songwriter ===
His rockabilly version of "Tennessee Waltz" made No. 63 on the Billboard Hot 100, and earned him an invitation to appear on American Bandstand.

In 1961, he wrote "Travelin' Man" which was originally intended for Sam Cooke. Ricky Nelson recorded it instead and the record sold six million copies worldwide. Fuller wrote 11 of Nelson's recordings, including the US Top 10 hits "A Wonder Like You", "Young World", and "It's Up to You".

Fuller toured as a featured singer with The Champs, whose other members included Glen Campbell, Jimmy Seals, and Dash Crofts, before a period in the U.S. Army. On his return in 1963, Challenge / Four Star moved him to New York City to run its east coast operation. There he discovered a garage band, The Knickerbockers, and produced their 1965 hit "Lies" (Can No. 11).

=== Producer ===
In 1967, he moved to Columbia Records as a producer. His first discovery was Gary Puckett and The Union Gap, whom he found in a San Diego bowling alley lounge. He wrote and produced the group's hits "Young Girl" (a UK No. 1; Can. No. 1), "Lady Willpower" (Can No. 1), and "Over You" (Can No. 5). He also produced Mark Lindsay, The Peanut Butter Conspiracy, and O.C. Smith, for whom he produced the hits "The Son of Hickory Holler's Tramp" (Can No. 20) and "Little Green Apples" (Can No. 6). He remained with Columbia until 1971.

In 1970 he started Moonchild production company, writing and producing the hit "Show and Tell" for Al Wilson in 1973 (Can No. 7).

=== Greatest hits ===
In Fuller's later years, he recorded his own renditions of many of the songs he worked on, and released them in a three-volume album series between 2016 and 2018.

== Personal life and death ==
In 1965, Fuller married Annette Smerigan, and they had two children; the couple had first been introduced by Glen Campbell.

Fuller died from lung cancer at his home in Sherman Oaks, Los Angeles, on July 18, 2024, at the age of 85.

== Discography ==
=== Albums ===
Year	Album	Label
1960	Teenage Love	Lin

=== Singles ===
Year	Single	Chart Positions				Album
Year	Single	US	US Country	CAN	CAN Country	Album
1959	"Betty My Angel"	90	—	—	—	Teenage Love
1959	"Tennessee Waltz"	63	—	13	—	Teenage Love
1961	"Guilty of Loving You"	94	—	—	—	Teenage Love
1961	"Shy Away"	71	—	—	—	Teenage Love
1973	"Lazy Susan"	—	—	80	—	Singles only
1979	"Salt on the Wound"	—	98	—	—	Singles only
1979	"Lines"	—	90	—	60	Singles only
