= List of 2000s deaths in popular music =

The following is a list of notable performers of rock and roll music or rock music, and others directly associated with the music as producers, songwriters or in other closely related roles, who have died in the 2000s. The list gives their date, cause and location of death, and their age.

Rock music developed from the rock and roll music that emerged during the 1950s, and includes a diverse range of subgenres. The terms "rock and roll" and "rock" each have a variety of definitions, some narrow and some wider. In determining criteria for inclusion, this list uses as its basis reliable sources listing "rock deaths" or "deaths in rock and roll", as well as such sources as the Rock and Roll Hall of Fame.

Preceded by 1990s	List of deaths in popular music 2000s	Succeeded by 2010s

== 2000 ==
Name	Age	Date	Location	Cause of death
Nat Adderley; Cannonball Adderley's brother	68	January 2, 2000	Lakeland, Florida, U.S.	Complications from diabetes
Harmonica Fats	72	January 3, 2000	Los Angeles, California, U.S.	Unknown
Ida Goodson	90	January 5, 2000	Pensacola, Florida, U.S.	Unknown
Wade Walton	76	January 10, 2000	St. Louis, Missouri, U.S.	Unknown
Richard "Dimples" Fields	57	January 12, 2000	Novato, California, U.S.	Stroke
Annie Palmen	73	January 15, 2000	Beverwijk, Netherlands	Long illness of an undisclosed nature
Gene Harris	66	January 16, 2000	Boise, Idaho, U.S.	Kidney failure
Dub Jones; The Coasters	71	January 16, 2000	Long Beach, California, U.S.	Diabetes
Josh Clayton-Felt; School of Fish	32	January 19, 2000	Los Angeles, California, U.S.	Testicular cancer
Friedrich Gulda	69	January 27, 2000	Steinbach am Attersee, Austria	
Alla Rakha	80	February 3, 2000	South Mumbai, India	
Doris Coley; The Shirelles	58	February 4, 2000	Sacramento, California, U.S.	Breast cancer
Steve Waller; Manfred Mann's Earth Band	48	February 6, 2000	Stroud, Gloucestershire, England	Liver problems
Dave Peverett; Foghat	56	February 7, 2000	Orlando, Florida, U.S.	Renal cancer
Big Pun	28	February 7, 2000	White Plains, New York, U.S.	Heart attack
Screamin' Jay Hawkins	70	February 12, 2000	Neuilly-sur-Seine, France	Complications following surgery concerning aneurysm
Andy Lewis; The Whitlams	33	February 12, 2000	Sydney, Australia	Suicide
Oliver	54	February 12, 2000	Shreveport, Louisiana, U.S.	Lymphatic cancer
Olgita DeCastro; The DeCastro Sisters	68	February 14, 2000	Las Vegas, Nevada, U.S.	Asthma
William "Wee Gee" Howard; The Dramatics	49	February 22, 2000	Bronxville, Westchester County, New York, U.S.	
Ofra Haza	42	February 23, 2000	Ramat Gan, Israel	AIDS-related pneumonia
Dennis Danell; Social Distortion	38	February 29, 2000	Costa Mesa, California, U.S.	Brain aneurysm
Pee Wee King	86	March 7, 2000	Louisville, Kentucky, U.S.	Heart attack
Charles Gray	71	March 7, 2000	London, England	Cancer
Tommy Collins	69	March 14, 2000	Ashland City, Tennessee, United States	
Bles Bridges; South African singer	53	March 24, 2000	Bloemhof, South Africa	Car accident
Ian Dury; Ian Dury and the Blockheads	57	March 27, 2000	Upminster, London, England	Colon cancer
Adrian Fisher; Sparks	47	March 31, 2000	Ko Samui, Thailand	Myocardial infarction
Joe Rock; Manager and producer for The Skyliners	63	April 4, 2000	Nashville, Tennessee, United States	Complications from quadruple bypass heart surgery
Gene Pearson; The Cleftones	64	April 6, 2000	Kingston, Jamaica	Lung cancer
Richard Trice	82	April 6, 2000	Burnsville, North Carolina, U.S.	
Heinz Burt; The Tornados	57	April 7, 2000	Southampton, England	Motor neurone disease and stroke
Cleveland Horne; The Fantastic Four	57	April 13, 2000	Detroit, Michigan, United States	Heart attack
Robert Mosese; The Radios	30	April 20, 2000	Antwerp, Belgium	Complications from a brain tumor
Neal Matthews Jr. The Jordanaires	70	April 21, 2000	Brentwood, Tennessee, U.S.	Heart attack
Barkin' Bill Smith	71	April 24, 2000	Chicago, Illinois, U.S.	Pancreatic cancer
Vicki Sue Robinson	45	April 27, 2000	Wilton, Connecticut, U.S.	Cancer
Marjorie Noël	54	April 30, 2000	Cavaillon, France	Cerebral hemorrhage
Bobbi Martin	60	May 2, 2000	Baltimore, Maryland, U.S.	Cancer
Dédé Fortin; Les Colocs	37	May 8, 2000	Montreal, Quebec, Canada	Suicide
Geoff Goddard	62	May 15, 2000	England, U.K.	Heart attack
Joe Jaramillo; Cannibal & the Headhunters	52	May 24, 2000	Los Angeles, California, United States	Cirrhosis of the liver
Tex Beneke; Glenn Miller Orchestra	86	May 30, 2000	Costa Mesa, California, United States	
Johnnie Taylor	66	May 31, 2000	Dallas, Texas, U.S.	Heart attack
Tito Puente	77	June 1, 2000	New York City, New York, U.S.	Heart attack
Ralph Jones; Bill Haley & His Comets	78	June 1, 2000	Chester, Pennsylvania, U.S.	Unknown
Bruno Martino Italian singer and composer	74	June 12, 2000	Rome, Italy	Heart attack
Paul Griffin	62	June 14, 2000	New York City, New York, U.S.	Complications from diabetes
Hattie Littles	63	June 15, 2000	Flint, Michigan, U.S.	Heart attack
Clive Westlake	67	June 17, 2000	Pegram, Tennessee, U.S.	Unknown
Benediktas Gadeikis; Lithuanian singer	57	June 21, 2000	Vilnius, Lithuania	
Jerome Richardson	79	June 23, 2000	Englewood, New Jersey, U.S.	
Rodrigo Bueno	27	June 24, 2000	Berazategui, Argentina	Traffic collision
Chuck Briggs; U.S. Bombs	40	July 4, 2000	Southern California, United States	Complications from drug abuse
Yuri Klinskikh; Sektor Gaza	35	July 4, 2000	Voronezh, Russia	Heart failure
Michael Hartman; Guitarist for David Lee Roth and Jeff Beck	24	July 6, 2000	Marion, Indiana, United States	Cystic fibrosis
Paul Young; Mike + The Mechanics, Sad Café	53	July 15, 2000	Hale, Altrincham, England	Heart attack
Johnny Duncan	67	July 15, 2000	Taree, New South Wales, Australia	Cancer
Ronn Goedert; White Witch	49	July 16, 2000	Tampa, Hillsborough County, Florida, U.S.	Cancer
Jerome Smith; KC and the Sunshine Band	47	July 28, 2000	Miami, Florida, U.S.	Crushed by a bulldozer
Anthony "Gorps" Fischer; Pfuri, Gorps and Kniri	52 to 53	July 31, 2000	Basel, Switzerland	Stroke
Talal Maddah	60	August 11, 2000	Abha, Saudi Arabia	Heart attack while performing
Nazia Hassan	35	August 13, 2000	London, England	Lung cancer
Alan Caddy; Johnny Kidd & The Pirates; The Tornados	60	August 16, 2000	London, England	Complications due to alcoholism
Jack Nitzsche; Crazy Horse, The Rolling Stones	63	August 25, 2000	Los Angeles, California, U.S.	Cardiac arrest
Allen Woody; The Allman Brothers Band, Gov't Mule	44	August 26, 2000	Queens, New York, U.S.	Heroin overdose
Sean Patrick McCabe; Ink & Dagger	27	August 28, 2000	Indiana, U.S.	Asphyxiation
Saunders King	91	August 31, 2000	San Rafael, California, U.S.	Unknown
David Brown; Santana	53	September 4, 2000	Los Angeles, California , U.S.	Liver and kidney failure
Luca Abort Italian singer, exponent of the Turin nihilism of the 80s, famous for having been the frontman of the hardcore punk group Nerorgasmo from 1983 to 1987	36	September 8, 2000	Turin, Italy	Heroin overdose
"Sweet James" Epps; Lead singer of The Fantastic Four	63	September 11, 2000	Detroit, Michigan, United States	Heart attack
Stanley Turrentine	66	September 12, 2000	New York City, New York, U.S.	Stroke
Ian "Spike" Spice; Drummer for Breathe	34	September 24, 2000	Thailand	Undisclosed cause; Possible car crash
Baden Powell	63	September 26, 2000	Rio de Janeiro, Brazil	
Benjamin Orr; The Cars	53	October 3, 2000	Atlanta, Georgia, U.S.	Pancreatic cancer
Britt Woodman	80	October 13, 2000	Hawthorne, California, U.S.	Respiratory failure
Joachim Nielsen; Jokke & Valentinerne	36	October 17, 2000	Oslo, Norway	Heroin overdose
Julie London	74	October 18, 2000	Los Angeles, California, U.S.	Stroke and cardiac arrest
Little Mack Simmons	67	October 24, 2000	Chicago, Illinois, U.S.	Colon cancer
Laila Kinnunen; First Finnish representative at the Eurovision Song Contest	60	October 26, 2000	Heinävesi, Finland	Slipped and broke her neck
Winston Grennan	56	October 27, 2000	Nantucket, Massachusetts, U.S.	Cancer
Jimmie Davis	101	November 5, 2000	Baton Rouge, Louisiana, U.S.	Stroke
Jimmy Hill; Ray Columbus and the Invaders	56	November 7, 2000	Auckland, New Zealand	Heart ailment
Dick Morrissey; If	60	November 8, 2000	Deal, Kent, England	Cancer
Dave Wilson; Drummer for The Cascades	64	November 14, 2000	Coeur d'Alene, Idaho	Cancer
Joe C. Kid Rock	26	November 16, 2000	Taylor, Michigan, U.S.	Severe Celiac Disease
Dušan Dejanović; Ekatarina Velika	40	November 16, 2000	Belgrade, Serbia, FR Yugoslavia	AIDS
DJ Screw	29	November 16, 2000	Houston, Texas, U.S.	Codeine overdose
Bobby Sheen; Bob B. Soxx & the Blue Jeans	59	November 23, 2000	Los Angeles, California, U.S.	Pneumonia
Frankie Smith; The Monotones	62	November 26, 2000	Newark, New Jersey, United States	Lung cancer
Scott Smith; Loverboy	45	November 30, 2000	San Francisco, California, U.S.	Boating accident
Hannu Karlsson; Pihasoittajat	50	December ?, 2000	?, Finland	Unknown
Hoyt Curtin; Primary music director for the Hanna-Barbera animation studio from 1957 to 1986	78	December 3, 2000	Thousand Oaks, California, U.S.	Accidental fall
Joe Nanini; Black Randy and the Metrosquad, Wall of Voodoo	45	December 4, 2000	Atlanta, Georgia, U.S.	Brain Hemorrhage
Velvert Turner	49	December 11, 2000	Brooklyn, New York, U.S.	
Pirkle Lee Moses; The El Dorados	63	December 16, 2000	Chicago, Illinois, U.S.	Cancer
Kirsty MacColl	41	December 18, 2000	Cozumel, Quintana Roo, Mexico	Hit by powerboat
Rob Buck; 10,000 Maniacs	42	December 19, 2000	Pittsburgh, Pennsylvania, U.S.	Acute liver disease
Milt Hinton	90	December 19, 2000	Queens, New York, U.S.	Unknown
Pops Staples; The Staple Singers	85	December 19, 2000	Chicago, Illinois, U.S.	Injuries from a fall
Matthew McQuater; The Clovers	73	December 19, 2000	Dallas, Texas, U.S.	Unknown
Allan Smethurst	73	December 22, 2000	Grimsby, Lincolnshire, England	
Johnny Flamingo	66	December 24, 2000	Los Angeles, California, U.S.	Cancer and emphysema
Nick Massi; The Four Seasons	73	December 24, 2000	West Orange, New Jersey, U.S.	Cancer
Jack McVea	86	December 27, 2000	Los Angeles, California, U.S.	Unknown
Magik; Kaliber 44	22	December 28, 2000	Katowice, Silesian Voivodeship, Poland	Suicide
Willie D. Warren	76	December 30, 2000	Detroit, Michigan, U.S.	
Isaac Guillory	53	December 31, 2000	Newcastle, England	

== 2001 ==
Name	Age	Date	Location	Cause of death
Milan Hlavsa; Plastic People of the Universe	49	January 5, 2001	Prague, Czechia	Lung cancer
James Carr	58	January 7, 2001	Memphis, Tennessee, U.S.	Lung cancer
Bryan Gregory; The Cramps	49	January 10, 2001	Anaheim, California, U.S.	Heart failure
Jack McDuff	74	January 23, 2001	Minneapolis, Minnesota, U.S.	Heart failure
J.J. Johnson	77	February 4, 2001	Indianapolis, Indiana, U.S.	Suicide by gunshot
Dale Evans	88	February 7, 2001	Apple Valley, California, U.S.	Congestive heart failure
Debbie Dean	73	February 17, 2001	Ojai, California, U.S.	Unknown
Liza 'N' Eliaz	42	February 19, 2001	Antwerp, Belgium	Lung cancer
John Fahey	61	February 22, 2001	Salem, Oregon, U.S.	Complications following coronary bypass surgery
Lloyd "Mooseman" Roberts III; Body Count	38	February 22, 2001	Los Angeles, California, U.S.	Murder by gunshot
Glenn Hughes; Village People	50	March 4, 2001	Manhattan, New York City, New York, U.S.	Lung cancer
Mike "Smitty" Smith; Paul Revere & the Raiders	58	March 6, 2001	Kailua-Kona, Hawaii	Natural causes
Robert Ealey	75	March 8, 2001	Fort Worth, Texas, U.S.	Undisclosed causes following car accident
John Phillips; The Mamas & the Papas	65	March 18, 2001	Los Angeles, California, U.S.	Heart failure
Herbie Jones	74	March 19, 2001	New York City, New York, U.S.	Complications from diabetes
Earl Beal; The Silhouettes	71	March 22, 2001	Philadelphia, Pennsylvania, U.S.	Unknown
John Lewis	80	March 29, 2001	New York City, New York, U.S.	Prostate cancer
Big Daddy Kinsey	74	April 3, 2001	Gary, Indiana, U.S.	Prostate cancer
Butch Moore	63	April 3, 2001	Massachusetts, U.S.	Heart attack
Paul Peek; Gene Vincent & His Blue Caps	63	April 3, 2001	Lithonia, Georgia, U.S.	Cirrhosis
Charles Pettigrew; Charles & Eddie	37	April 6, 2001	Philadelphia, Pennsylvania, U.S.	Cancer
Van Stephenson; Blackhawk	47	April 8, 2001	Nashville, Tennessee, U.S.	Melanoma
Sandy Bull	60	April 11, 2001	Nashville, Tennessee, U.S.	Lung cancer
Joey Ramone; The Ramones	49	April 15, 2001	New York City, New York, U.S.	Lymphoma
Al Hibbler	85	April 24, 2001	Chicago, Illinois, U.S.	Natural causes
Ernie Graham; Eire Apparent, Help Yourself, Clancy	54	April 27, 2001	London, England	Alcohol related illness
Billy Higgins	64	May 3, 2001	Inglewood, California, U.S.	Kidney & liver failure
Boozoo Chavis	70	May 5, 2001	Austin, Texas, U.S.	Complications following a heart attack
Mike Hazlewood	59	May 6, 2001	Florence, Italy	Heart attack
James E. Myers; Record producer for Bill Haley & His Comets	81	May 10, 2001	Bonita Springs, Florida, U.S.	Unknown
Perry Como	88	May 12, 2001	Jupiter Inlet Colony, Florida, U.S.	Alzheimer's disease.
Prince Ital Joe	38	May 16, 2001	Phoenix, Arizona, U.S.	Traffic accident
Susannah McCorkle	55	May 19, 2001	New York City, New York, U.S.	Suicide by jumping
Renato Carosone Italian singer-songwriter and pianist	81	May 20, 2001	Rome, Italy	Long respiratory illness
Brian Pendleton; Pretty Things	57	May 25, 2001	Maidstone, Kent, England	Lung cancer
Tony Ashton	55	May 28, 2001	London, England	Cancer
Carole Fredericks	49	June 7, 2001	Dakar, Senegal	Apparent heart attack
Marcelo Fromer; Titãs	39	June 13, 2001	São Paulo, São Paulo, Brazil	Traffic accident
Davorin Popović; Indexi	54	June 18, 2001	Sarajevo, Bosnia and Herzegovina	Melanoma
Lindsay L. Cooper	61	June 19, 2001	Edinburgh, Scotland	
John Lee Hooker	83	June 21, 2001	Los Altos, California, U.S.	Natural causes
Chet Atkins	77	June 30, 2001	Nashville, Tennessee, U.S.	Colon Cancer
Joe Henderson	64	June 30, 2001	San Francisco, California, U.S.	Emphysema
Roy Nichols; Merle Haggard	68	July 3, 2001	Bakersfield, California, U.S.	Heart attack
Ernie K-Doe	68	July 5, 2001	New Orleans, Louisiana, U.S.	Kidney and liver failure
Fred Neil	65	July 7, 2001	Summerland Key, Florida, U.S.	Squamous-cell carcinoma
Big Ed	29	July 8, 2001	New Orleans, Louisiana, U.S.	Lymphoma cancer
Pierfranco Colonna Italian singer	56	July 9, 2001	Turin, Italy	
Herman Brood	54	July 11, 2001	Amsterdam, Netherlands	Suicide
Ian Lowery; The Wall, Ski Patrol, Folk Devils	45	July 14, 2001	London, England	
Anthony Ian Berkeley; Gravediggaz	36	July 15, 2001	Beverly Hills, California, U.S.	Colon cancer
Mimi Fariña	56	July 18, 2001	Mill Valley, California, U.S.	Neuroendocrine tumor
Judy Clay	62	July 19, 2001	Fayetteville, North Carolina, U.S.	Complications following traffic accident
Milt Gabler; Record producer	90	July 20, 2001	Manhattan, New York, U.S.	Unknown
Richie Lee; Acetone	34	July 23, 2001	Los Angeles, California, U.S.	Suicide
Harold Land	72	July 27, 2001	Los Angeles, California, U.S.	Stroke
Leon Wilkeson; Lynyrd Skynyrd	49	July 27, 2001	Ponte Vedra Beach, Florida, U.S.	Natural causes
Bill Wade; Moxy	53	July 27, 2001	Toronto, Canada	Cancer
David Gilbert; The Rockets	49	August 1, 2001	Detroit, Michigan, U.S.	Liver cancer
Ronald Townson; The 5th Dimension	68	August 2, 2001	Las Vegas, Nevada, U.S.	Renal failure
Lou Garscadden; Slash Puppet	36	August 4, 2001	Toronto, Canada	Heart attack
Paul Cunniffe; Blaze X	40	August 11, 2001	Whitechapel, London, England	fall from a height
Maurice Oberstein	72	August 13, 2001	London, England	Heart attack
Betty Everett	61	August 19, 2001	South Beloit, Illinois, U.S.	Heart attack
Aaliyah	22	August 25, 2001	Abaco Islands, Bahamas	2001 Marsh Harbour Cessna 402 crash
Graeme Strachan; Skyhooks	49	August 29, 2001	Mount Archer, Queensland, Australia	Helicopter accident
Ted Mulry	53	September 1, 2001	Sydney, Australia	Brain cancer
Sil Austin	71	September 1, 2001	College Park, Maryland, U.S	Prostate cancer
Jay Migliori	70	September 2, 2001	Mission Viejo, California, U.S.	Colon cancer
Dave Myers; The Aces	74	September 3, 2001	Chicago, Illinois, U.S.	Diabetes
Carl Crack	30	September 6, 2001	Berlin, Germany	Heroin overdose
DJ Uncle Al	32	September 10, 2001	Miami, Florida, U.S.	Murdered
Carolyn Beug; Record producer for Walt Disney Records	48	September 11, 2001	North Tower, One World Trade Center, New York City, New York, U.S.	American Airlines Flight 11 hijacking and crash
Kenny Greene; Intro	32	October 1, 2001	New York City, New York, U.S.	Complications from AIDS
Tullio Pane Italian singer	71	October 3, 2001	Civitavecchia, Rome, Italy	
Peter Doyle; The New Seekers	52	October 13, 2001	Castlemaine, Victoria, Australia	Throat cancer
Etta Jones	72	October 16, 2001	Mount Vernon, New York, U.S.	Cancer
Kim Gardner; Badger, Ashton, Gardner and Dyke, The Birds, The Creation	53	October 24, 2001	Los Angeles, California, U.S.	Cancer
Panama Francis	82	November 13, 2001	Orlando, Florida, U.S.	Stroke
Tommy Flanagan	71	November 16, 2001	New York City, New York, U.S.	Complications from an aneurysm
Jack Rothstein; The Wombles	75	November 16, 2001	London, England	Unknown
Isaac Scott	56	November 16, 2001	Edmonds, Washington, U.S.	Complications from diabetes
Michael Karoli; Can	53	November 17, 2001	Essen, Germany	Cancer
Scott Murray; 28 Days	22	November 18, 2001	Melbourne, Victoria, Australia	Hit by a car
Norman Granz; Record producer	83	November 22, 2001	Geneva, Switzerland	Cancer
O.C. Smith	69	November 23, 2001	Los Angeles, California, U.S.	Heart attack
Melanie Thornton; La Bouche	34	November 24, 2001	Bassersdorf, Switzerland	Plane accident
Maria Serrano Serrano; Passion Fruit	27	November 24, 2001	Bassersdorf, Switzerland	Plane accident
Nathaly "Nathy" van het Ende; Passion Fruit	26	November 24, 2001	Bassersdorf, Switzerland	Plane accident
George Harrison; The Beatles, Traveling Wilburys	58	November 29, 2001	Los Angeles, California, U.S.	Lung cancer
Grady Martin	72	December 3, 2001	Lewisburg, Tennessee, U.S.	Heart attack
Harry Winter	87	December 3, 2001	Vienna, Austria	Natural causes
James Crutchfield	89	December 7, 2001	St. Louis, Missouri, U.S.	Heart disease
Chuck Schuldiner; Death, Control Denied	34	December 13, 2001	Altamonte Springs, Florida, U.S.	Brain cancer
Bianca Halstead; Humble Gods	36	December 15, 2001	New Orleans, Louisiana, U.S.	Traffic accident
Rufus Thomas	84	December 15, 2001	Memphis, Tennessee, U.S.	Heart failure
Stuart Adamson; The Skids, Big Country, The Raphaels	43	December 16, 2001	Honolulu, Hawaii, U.S.	Suicide by hanging
Clifford T. Ward	57	December 18, 2001	Tenbury Wells, Worcestershire, England	Pneumonia
Christine Kittrell	72	December 19, 2001	Columbus, Ohio, U.S.	Emphysema
Lance Loud; The Mumps	50	December 22, 2001	Los Angeles, California, U.S.	Liver failure as a result from hepatitis C and HIV
Gareth Williams; This Heat	48	December 24, 2001	London, U.K.	Cancer
Frankie Gaye; Marvin Gaye's brother	60	December 30, 2001	Los Angeles, California, U.S.	Heart attack

== 2002 ==
Name	Age	Date	Location	Cause of death
Zac Foley; EMF	31	January 3, 2002	Camden, New Jersey, U.S.	Speedball and alcohol overdose
Bill Savich; Johnny and the Hurricanes	63	January 4, 2002	Simi Valley, Ventura, California, U.S.	Cancer
John Dawson; The Poets	57	January 6, 2002	Glasgow, Scotland	Cancer
Jon Lee; Feeder	33	January 7, 2002	Miami, Florida, U.S.	Suicide by hanging
Tyrone "Crusher" Green; Wilson Pickett	58	January 8, 2002	Long Island, New York, United States	Pancreatic cancer
David McWilliams	56	January 8, 2002	Ballycastle, County Antrim, Northern Ireland	Heart attack
Hoagy Lands	65	January 12, 2002	Orange, New Jersey, U.S.	Complications following heart surgery
Sally Donaldson; Radio host for the RBC	57	January 14, 2002	Harare, Zimbabwe	Throat cancer
Eddie Meduza	53	January 17, 2002	Nöbbele, Sweden	Heart attack
Carlo Karges; Nena	50	January 20, 2002	Hamburg, Germany	Liver failure
Peggy Lee	81	January 21, 2002	Los Angeles, California, U.S.	Complications of diabetes following a heart attack
Peter Bardens; Camel	56	January 22, 2002	Malibu, California, U.S.	Lung cancer
Henry Cosby	73	January 22, 2002	Royal Oak, Michigan, U.S.	Complications following cardiac bypass surgery
Nunzio Filogamo Italian radio host, television host, actor, singer and radio director	99	January 24, 2002	Rodello, Italy	
Andy Kulberg; The Blues Project, Seatrain	57	January 28, 2002	Fairfax, California, U.S.	Lymphoma
Carlo Karges; Nena, Novalis	50	January 30, 2002	Hamburg, Germany	Liver failure
Paul Baloff; Exodus, Hirax, Heathen	41	February 2, 2002	Oakland, California, U.S.	Stroke/Coma
Willis Draffen; Bloodstone	56	February 8, 2002	Kansas City, Missouri, U.S.	Unknown
Dave Van Ronk	65	February 10, 2002	New York City, New York, U.S.	Cardiopulmonary failure while undergoing postoperative treatment for colon cancer
Waylon Jennings	64	February 13, 2002	Chandler, Arizona, U.S.	Complications from diabetes
Mick Tucker; Sweet	54	February 14, 2002	Welwyn Garden City, Hertfordshire, England	Leukemia
Billy Ward; Billy Ward and his Dominoes	80	February 16, 2002	Inglewood, California, U.S.	Unknown
Huey Davis; The Contours	63	February 23, 2002	Detroit, Michigan, U.S.	Died at his home
Doreen Waddell; Soul II Soul, The KLF	36	March 1, 2002	Shoreham, West Sussex, England	Traffic accident
Shirley Scott	67	March 10, 2002	Philadelphia, Pennsylvania, U.S.	Heart failure
Cranford Nix; The Malakas	33	March 12, 2002	Berkley, Michigan, U.S.	Heroin overdose
Speedy Keen; The Who, Thunderclap Newman	56	March 12, 2002	London, England	Heart failure
Marc Moreland; Wall of Voodoo, The Skulls	44	March 13, 2002	Paris, France	Liver & kidney failure
Marshall Leib; The Teddy Bears	63	March 15, 2002	Northridge, Los Angeles, California, U.S.	Heart attack
John Patton	66	March 19, 2002	Montclair, New Jersey, U.S.	Complications from diabetes
Joe Schermie; Three Dog Night	56	March 26, 2002	Los Angeles, California, U.S.	Heart attack
Randy Castillo; Ozzy Osbourne, Mötley Crüe	51	March 26, 2002	Los Angeles, California, U.S.	Skin cancer
Dudley Moore	66	March 27, 2002	Plainfield, New Jersey, U.S.	Pneumonia from Palsy
Milton Berle	93	March 27, 2002	Los Angeles, California, U.S.	Colon cancer
Randy Carr; Social Distortion	45	March 27, 2002	Irvine, California, U.S.	Cushing's syndrome
Frank Tovey; Fad Gadget	45	April 3, 2002	London, England	Heart attack
Layne Staley; Alice in Chains, Mad Season	34	April 5, 2002	Seattle, Washington, U.S.	Speedball overdose
Kevin Kelley; The Byrds	59	April 6, 2002	Hollywood, Los Angeles, California, U.S.	Natural causes
Conny Vandenbos	65	April 7, 2002	Amsterdam, Netherlands	Lung cancer
Alex Baroni Italian singer-songwriter	35	April 13, 2002	Rome, Italy	Motorcycle accident
Alan Dale	76	April 20, 2002	New York City, New York, U.S.	Died after a long illness
Pierre Rapsat	53	April 20, 2002	Verviers, Belgium	Cancer
Lisa Lopes; TLC	30	April 25, 2002	La Ceiba, Honduras	Traffic accident
Dick Campbell	58	April 25, 2002	Madison, Wisconsin, U.S.	Complications from lung transplant
César Díaz; Stevie Ray Vaughan, Bob Dylan, Eric Clapton, Keith Richards, Neil Young	50	April 26, 2002	Stroudsburg, Pennsylvania	Unknown
Otis Blackwell	71	May 6, 2002	Nashville, Tennessee, U.S.	Heart attack
James Dewar; Robin Trower, Stone the Crows	59	May 16, 2002	Paisley, Renfrewshire, Scotland	Stroke
Little Johnny Taylor	59	May 17, 2002	Conway, Arkansas, U.S.	Died at his home
Umberto Bindi Italian singer-songwriter and composer	70	May 23, 2002	Rome, Italy	Heart disease
Boyd Bennett	77	June 2, 2002	Sarasota, Florida, U.S.	Lung ailment
Niki Davis Italian singer	66	June 2, 2002	Milan, Italy	
Giorgio Porcaro Italian cabaret artist, comedian, actor, and singer	49	June 4, 2002	Monza, Italy	
Boo Duckworth; Drummer for Animal Bag	35	June 5, 2002	Charlotte, North Carolina, U.S.	Natural causes
Dee Dee Ramone; The Ramones	50	June 5, 2002	Los Angeles, California, U.S.	Heroin overdose
Robbin Crosby; Ratt	42	June 6, 2002	Los Angeles, California, U.S.	Heroin overdose
Laurie Allen; Bobbie & Laurie	60	June 13, 2002	Melbourne, Australia	Heart attack
John Entwistle; The Who	57	June 27, 2002	Las Vegas, Nevada, U.S.	Cocaine-induced heart attack
Russ Freeman	76	June 27, 2002	Las Vegas, Nevada, U.S.	Unknown
Rosemary Clooney	74	June 29, 2002	Beverly Hills, California, U.S.	Lung cancer
Richard "Pistol" Allen; The Funk Brothers	69	June 30, 2002	Detroit, Michigan, U.S.	Cancer
Ray Brown; Ella Fitzgerald, Oscar Peterson, Dizzy Gillespie, The L.A. Four	75	July 2, 2002	Indianapolis, Indiana, U.S.	Natural causes
Earle Brown	75	July 2, 2002	Rye, New York, U.S.	Cancer
Jim Cherry; Strung Out, Pulley, Zero Down	30	July 7, 2002	Simi Valley, California, U.S.	Congenital heart condition
Rosco Gordon	74	July 11, 2002	Rego Park, Queens, New York, U.S.	Heart attack
Cláudio Rodrigues (aka Claudinho); Claudinho & Buchecha	26	July 13, 2002	Seropédica, Greater Rio de Janeiro, Brazil	Car accident
Barbara Randolph	60	July 15, 2002	Somewhere in South Africa	Cancer
Otis Leavill; Record producer	65	July 17, 2002	Chicago, Illinois, U.S.	Heart attack
Arthur Lee Maye "Arthur Lee Maye & the Crowns"	67	July 17, 2002	Riverside, California, U.S.	Pancreatic & liver cancer
Dave Carter; Dave Carter and Tracy Grammer	49	July 19, 2002	Hadley, Massachusetts, U.S.	Heart attack
Alan Lomax	87	July 19, 2002	Safety Harbor, Florida, U.S.	Pneumonia
Little Jimmy King	37	July 19, 2002	Memphis, Tennessee, U.S.	Heart attack
Gus Dudgeon; Record producer	59	July 21, 2002	M4 motorway, Berkshire, England	Traffic accident
Roscoe Shelton	70	July 27, 2002	Nashville, Tennessee, U.S.	Cancer
Paul Samson; Samson	49	August 9, 2002	Norwich, England	Cancer
Michael Houser; Widespread Panic	40	August 10, 2002	Athens, Georgia, U.S.	Pancreatic cancer
Dave Williams; Drowning Pool	30	August 14, 2002	Manassas, Virginia, U.S.	Heart failure caused by cardiomyopathy
Lionel Hampton	94	August 31, 2002	New York City, New York, U.S.	Congestive heart failure
Chris Rice; 3AE, The Denizens	29	September 6, 2002	Orlando, Orange Country, Florida, U.S.	Car accident
Erma Franklin	64	September 7, 2002	Detroit, Michigan, U.S.	Laryngeal cancer
Paul Williams	87	September 14, 2002	New York City, New York, U.S.	
Margita Stefanović; Ekatarina Velika	43	September 18, 2002	Belgrade, Serbia, FR Yugoslavia	Toxoplasmosis
Goffredo Canarini Italian singer-songwriter, composer and lyricist	62	September 19, 2002	Vecchiano, Pisa, Italy	
Tim Rose; The Big 3	62	September 24, 2002	London, England	Heart attack
Mickey Newbury; Singer-songwriter	62	September 29, 2002	Springfield, Oregon, U.S.	Emphysema
Dalvanius Prime; Māori musician and cultural leader	54	October 3, 2002	Hāwera, New Zealand	Cancer
Darryl DeLoach; Iron Butterfly	55	October 3, 2002	San Diego, California, U.S.	Hepatocellular carcinoma/Liver cancer
Pierangelo Bertoli Italian singer-songwriter	59	October 7, 2002	Modena, Italy	Heart attack due to a tumor
Ray Conniff	85	October 12, 2002	Escondido, California, U.S.	Head trauma after a fall
Ramon Loper; The Five Keys	66	October 16, 2002	New York City, U.S.	Died after a long illness
Bashful Brother Oswald	90	October 17, 2002	Madison, Tennessee, U.S.	
Paul Owens; The Dixie Hummingbirds, Swan Silvertones, Sensational Nightingales	78	October 17, 2002	Philadelphia, Pennsylvania, U.S.	Unknown
Anna King	64	October 21, 2002	Philadelphia, Pennsylvania, U.S.	
Richard Harris	72	October 25, 2002	Bloomsbury, London, England	Hodgkin's disease
Tom Dowd; Audio engineer & record producer	77	October 27, 2002	Aventura, Florida, U.S.	Emphysema
Baby Lloyd Stallworth; The Famous Flames	61	October 27, 2002	Tampa, Florida, U.S.	Natural Causes
Jam Master Jay; Run-DMC	37	October 30, 2002	New York City, New York, U.S.	Murdered
Claude "Juan" Johnson; Don and Juan	67	October 31, 2002	New York City, New York, U.S.	Unknown
Lonnie Donegan	71	November 3, 2002	Peterborough, England	Heart attack
Billy Guy; The Coasters	66	November 5, 2002	Clark County, Nevada, U.S.	Cardiovascular disease
Michael Stewart; Guitarist/Banjo for We Five	57	November 13, 2002	Sacramento, California, U.S.	Died after a long illness/Possible suicide
Dave "Snaker" Ray	59	November 28, 2002	Minneapolis, Minnesota, U.S.	Lung cancer
Denny Correll; Blues Image	56	November 29, 2002	Newport, Rhode Island, U.S.	Heart failure
Ben Eberbaugh; Black Lips	22	December 1, 2002	Atlanta, Georgia, U.S.	Traffic accident
Mal Waldron	77	December 2, 2002	Brussels, Belgium	Cancer
Bernie Dwyer; Drummer for Freddie and the Dreamers	62	December 4, 2002	Heald Green, Metropolitan Borough of Stockport, Greater Manchester, England	Lung cancer
Mary Hansen; Stereolab	36	December 9, 2002	London, England	Traffic accident
Zal Yanovsky; The Lovin' Spoonful	57	December 13, 2002	Kingston, Ontario, Canada	Heart attack
Joe Strummer; The Clash, The Mescaleros	50	December 22, 2002	Broomfield, Somerset, England	Congenital heart defect
Kevin MacMichael; Cutting Crew	51	December 31, 2002	Halifax, Nova Scotia, Canada	Lung cancer

== 2003 ==
Name	Age	Date	Location	Cause of death
Giorgio Gaber Italian singer-songwriter and playwright	63	January 1, 2003	Camaiore, Lucca, Italy	Lung cancer which he battled for several years
Edward "Ed" Farran; The Arbors	65	January 2, 2003	Chicago, Illinois, U.S.	Kidney failure
King Biscuit Boy	58	January 5, 2003	Hamilton, Ontario, Canada	
Mickey Finn; T. Rex	55	January 11, 2003	Croydon, Surrey, England	Alcohol-related liver problems
Maurice Gibb; Bee Gees	53	January 12, 2003	Miami Beach, Florida, U.S.	Cardiac arrest following volvulus
Roger Troutman Jr. Zapp	32	January 22, 2003	Dayton, Ohio, U.S.	Heart failure
Nell Carter	54	January 23, 2003	Beverly Hills, California, U.S.	Arteriosclerotic heart disease complicated by diabetes
Sabotage	29	January 24, 2003	São Paulo, São Paulo, Brazil	Murdered
Don Lurio American dancer, choreogrpher, singer and actor naturalized Italian	73	January 26, 2003	Rome, Italy	Respiratory failure
Kevin "Dino" Conner; H-Town	28	January 28, 2003	Houston, Texas, U.S.	Car crash
Mongo Santamaría	85	February 1, 2003	Miami, Florida, U.S.	Stroke
Vincent "Randy" Chin; Record producer and record company owner	65	February 2, 2003	Fort Lauderdale, Florida, U.S.	Diabetes
Malcolm Roberts	58	February 7, 2003	Chertsey, Surrey, England	Heart attack
Johnny Paycheck	64	February 19, 2003	Nashville, Tennessee, U.S.	Emphysema
Ty Longley; Great White	31	February 20, 2003	West Warwick, Rhode Island, U.S.	The Station nightclub fire
Tom Glazer	88	February 21, 2003	Rochester, New York, U.S.	Died at his home
Howie Epstein; Tom Petty and the Heartbreakers	47	February 23, 2003	Santa Fe, New Mexico, U.S.	Heroin overdose
Earl Forest	76	February 26, 2003	Memphis, Tennessee, U.S.	Cancer
Hank Ballard; The Midnighters	75	March 2, 2003	Los Angeles, California, U.S.	Throat cancer
Alice Martineau	30	March 6, 2003	Kensington, London, England	Cystic fibrosis
Adam Faith	62	March 8, 2003	Stoke-on-Trent, Staffordshire, England	Heart attack
Jimmy Bilsbury; The Magic Lanterns, Les Humphries Singers	60	March 10, 2003	Bonn, Germany	Heart failure
Ian Samwell; The Shadows	66	March 13, 2003	Sacramento, California, U.S.	Heart ailment
Roberto Murolo Italian singer-songwriter and guitarist	91	March 13, 2003	Naples, Italy	
Hardin "Buddy" Pendergrass; White Witch	55	March 16, 2003	Tampa, Florida, U.S	Cancer
Teemu Raimoranta; Finntroll, Thy Serpent, Barathrum, Impaled Nazarene	25	March 16, 2003	Helsinki, Finland	Fall from the Kaisaniemi bridge in Helsinki while intoxicated
Brandi Wells	47	March 24, 2003	Chester, Pennsylvania, U.S.	Breast cancer
Chris Michie; Van Morrison	55	March 27, 2003	Fairfax, California, U.S.	Melanoma/Cancer
Tommy Seebach; Sir Henry and his Butlers, Tommy Seebach Band	53	March 31, 2003	Dyrehavsbakken, Lyngby-Taarbæk, Denmark	Heart attack from complications of alcoholism
Leslie Cheung	46	April 1, 2003	Mandarin Oriental, Hong Kong, China	Suicide
Edwin Starr	61	April 2, 2003	Bramcote, Nottingham, England	Heart attack
Homer Banks	61	April 3, 2003	Memphis, Tennessee, U.S.	Cancer
Mark Reynolds; Red Flag	31	April 7, 2003	2nd Avenue in San Diego, California	Suicide
Little Eva	59	April 10, 2003	Kinston, North Carolina, U.S.	Cervical cancer
Sean Delaney; Kiss	58	April 13, 2003	Utah, U.S.	Stroke
Allen Eager	76	April 13, 2003	Daytona Beach, Florida, U.S.	Liver cancer
Earl King	69	April 17, 2003	New Orleans, Louisiana, U.S.	Diabetes-related complications
Nina Simone	70	April 21, 2003	Carry-le-Rouet, France	Breast cancer
Jozef Dubán; Money Factor, Tublatanka	38	April 25, 2003	Bratislava, Slovakia	Suicide by jumping
Gerry Shephard; The Glitter Band	51	May 6, 2003	Chesham, Buckinghamshire, United Kingdom	Cancer
Rana Ross; Touring musician for Phantom Blue, Vixen	41	May 3, 2003	Burbank, California, U.S.	Liver failure
Noel Redding; The Jimi Hendrix Experience	57	May 11, 2003	County Cork, Ireland	Shock haemorrhage due to esophageal varices in reaction to cirrhosis
June Carter Cash; Carter Family, The Carter Sisters, Johnny Cash's second wife	73	May 15, 2003	Nashville, Tennessee, U.S.	Complications from heart-valve surgery
George Faith	56	May 16, 2003	Jamaica	Cancer
Jinny Osborn; The Chordettes	76	May 19, 2003	Palm Springs, Florida, U.S.	Cancer
Camoflauge	21	May 19, 2003	Savannah, Georgia, U.S.	Murdered
Joe "Guitar" Hughes	65	May 20, 2003	Houston, Texas, U.S.	Heart attack
Big DS; Onyx	31	May 22, 2003	Queens, New York City, U.S	Lymphatic cancer
Jeremy Ward; The Mars Volta, De Facto	27	May 25, 2003	Los Angeles, California, U.S.	Heroin overdose
Luciano Berio Italian composer	77	May 25, 2003	Rome, Italy	
Olimpia Di Nardo Italian actress and singer	55	May 29, 2003	Rome, Italy	Long illness
Mickie Most; Record producer	64	May 30, 2003	Totteridge, London, England	Peritoneal mesothelioma
Dave Rowberry; The Animals	62	June 6, 2003	Hackney, East London, England	Heart failure
Jimmy Knepper	75	June 14, 2003	Triadelphia, West Virginia, U.S.	Parkinson's disease
Sergio Bruni Italian singer-songwriter , guitarist and composer	81	June 22, 2003	Rome, Italy	
Mark Storm; Bassist for National Velvet	35	Died sometime between 2002 and 2003	Lake Ontario, Canada	Drowning
Berta Ambrož	58	July 1, 2003	Ljubljana, Slovenia	Undisclosed causes
Herbie Mann	73	July 1, 2003	Pecos, New Mexico, U.S.	Prostate cancer
Skip Scarborough; American arranger and record producer for L.T.D., Earth, Wind & Fire	58	July 3, 2003	Los Angeles, California, U.S.	Cancer
André Claveau; Winner of the 1958 Eurovision Song Contest	91	July 4, 2003	Agen, Lot-et-Garonne, France	Cerebral embolism
Barry White	58	July 4, 2003	Los Angeles, California, U.S.	Kidney failure/Stroke
Skip Battin; Skip & Flip, The Byrds, New Riders of the Purple Sage, The Flying Burrito Brothers	69	July 6, 2003	Salem, Oregon, U.S.	Complications from Alzheimer's disease
John Purdell; Record producer and arranger from Dream Theater, Kix, Heart and L.A. Guns	44	July 10, 2003	Quebec, Canada	Prostate cancer
Benny Carter	95	July 12, 2003	Los Angeles, California, U.S.	Complications from bronchitis
Celia Cruz	77	July 16, 2003	Fort Lee, New Jersey, U.S.	Complications from brain tumor
Adam Cox; The Exploding Hearts	23	July 20, 2003	Eugene, Oregon, U.S.	Traffic accident
Jeremy Gage; The Exploding Hearts	21	July 20, 2003	Eugene, Oregon, U.S.	Traffic accident
Matt Fitzgerald; The Exploding Hearts	20	July 20, 2003	Eugene, Oregon, U.S.	Traffic accident
Erik Brann; Iron Butterfly	52	July 25, 2003	Los Angeles, California, U.S.	Cardiac arrest
René Berg; Hanoi Rocks, "Suicide Twins", "The Hollywood Killers" etc...	47	July 28, 2003	London, England	Drug overdose
Greg Guidry; Singer-Songwriter	49	July 28, 2003	Fairview, Tennessee, U.S.	Fire
Sam Phillips; Businessman and record producer	80	July 30, 2003	Memphis, Tennessee, U.S.	Respiratory failure
Roger Voudouris	48	August 3, 2003	Sacramento, California, U.S.	Liver disease
Anna D'Amico Italian singer	87	August 8, 2003	Cologno Monzese, Milan, Italy	
Gregory Hines	57	August 9, 2003	Los Angeles, California, U.S.	Liver cancer
Dan Birney; Bassist for Head East	52	August 9, 2003	Phoenix, Arizona, United States	Cardiovascular disease
Matt Davis "the vidablue", "Ten Grand", Afro-Punk (film)	26	August 10, 2003	Bloomington–Normal, Illinois, U.S.	Aneurysm
Matt Moffitt; Matt Finish	46	August 12, 2003	Woollahra, New South Wales, Australia	Stroke
Ed Townsend	74	August 13, 2003	San Bernardino, California, U.S.	Heart attack
Charlie Cannon Singer and co-founder of the Starlight Opera in California	91	August 14, 2003	Lewiston, Idaho, United States	
Gösta Sundqvist Lead singer for Leevi and the Leavings	46	August 16, 2003	Espoo, Finland	Heart attack
Tony Jackson; The Searchers	63	August 18, 2003	Nottingham, England	Cirrhosis of the liver
Wesley Willis; Wesley Willis Fiasco	40	August 21, 2003	Chicago, Illinois, U.S.	Chronic myelogenous leukemia
Floyd Tillman	88	August 22, 2003	Bacliff, Texas, U.S.	Leukemia
Peter-Paul Pigmans a.k.a. 3 Steps Ahead	42	August 27, 2003	Rotterdam, Netherlands	Brain cancer
Bruce Waibel; FireHouse, Gregg Allman Band	45	September 2, 2003	Florida, U.S.	Suicide by carbon monoxide poisoning
Warren Zevon	56	September 7, 2003	Los Angeles, California, U.S.	Mesothelioma
Bob Markley; The West Coast Pop Art Experimental Band	68	September 9, 2003	Los Angeles, California, U.S.	Cause of death not reported
Johnny Cash	71	September 12, 2003	Nashville, Tennessee, U.S.	Complications from diabetes
Chubby Newsom	83	September 13, 2003	Merriam, Kansas, U.S.	
Sheb Wooley	82	September 16, 2003	Nashville, Tennessee, U.S.	Leukemia
Slim Dusty	76	September 19, 2003	St Ives, New South Wales, Australia	Lung & kidney cancer
Matthew Jay	24	September 25, 2003	London, England	Fall
Shawn Lane; Black Oak Arkansas	40	September 26, 2003	Memphis, Tennessee, U.S.	Severe lung complications
Robert Palmer; The Power Station	54	September 26, 2003	Paris, France	Heart attack
Paul Burlison; The Rock and Roll Trio	74	September 27, 2003	Horn Lake, Mississippi, U.S.	Colon cancer
John Brim	81	October 1, 2003	Gary, Indiana, U.S.	Heart cancer
John David Kimball; Omen	45	October 3, 2003	Washington, D.C., U.S.	Cancer
Robbie King; The Hometown Band	56	October 17, 2003	British Columbia, Canada	Cancer
Elliott Smith; Heatmiser	34	October 21, 2003	Los Angeles, California, U.S.	Stabbing (suicide or murder)
Half a Mill	30	October 24, 2003	New York City, New York, U.S.	Suicide by gunshot
Rosie Nix Adams	45	October 24, 2003	Clarksville, Tennessee, U.S.	Carbon monoxide poisoning
Oliver Sain	71	October 28, 2003	St. Louis, Missouri, U.S.	Bone cancer
Terry Bonchaka	21	October 29, 2003	Tetteh Quarshie Interchange, Ghana	Car crash
Steve O'Rourke; Manager from Pink Floyd	63	October 30, 2003	Miami, Florida, U.S.	Stroke
Bobby Hatfield; The Righteous Brothers	63	November 4, 2003	Kalamazoo, Michigan, U.S.	Heart attack causes by cocaine overdose
Guy Speranza; Riot	47	November 8, 2003	Orlando, Florida, U.S.	Pancreatic cancer
Tony Thompson; The Power Station, Chic	48	November 12, 2003	Los Angeles, California, U.S.	Renal cell carcinoma
Claude Trenier; The Treniers	84	November 16, 2003	Las Vegas, Nevada, United States	Bladder cancer
Arthur Conley	57	November 17, 2003	Ruurlo, Gelderland, Netherlands	Intestinal cancer
Michael Kamen; New York Rock & Roll Ensemble, orchestrator for Pink Floyd, Rush	55	November 18, 2003	London, England	Heart attack
Greg Ridley; Spooky Tooth, Humble Pie	62	November 19, 2003	Alicante, Spain	Pneumonia
Teddy Randazzo	68	November 21, 2003	Orlando, Florida, U.S.	Heart attack
Teddy Wilburn; The Wilburn Brothers	71	November 24, 2003	Nashville, Tennessee, U.S.	Congestive heart failure
Soulja Slim	26	November 26, 2003	New Orleans, Louisiana, U.S.	Murdered
Frank Leepa; Member of Sankomota	50	November 27, 2003	South Africa	Undisclosed
George Magnezid; The Wrens	69	December 9, 2003	Westchester County, New York	Unknown
Bill Deal; Bill Deal and the Rhondels	59	December 10, 2003	Virginia Beach, Virginia, U.S.	Heart attack
Gary Stewart	59	December 16, 2003	Fort Pierce, Florida, U.S.	Suicide by gunshot
Paul Balon; The Rebels	61	December 17, 2003	Buffalo, New York, U.S.	Heart disease
Dave Dudley	75	December 22, 2003	Danbury, Wisconsin, U.S.	Heart attack
Dick St. John; Dick & Dee Dee	63	December 27, 2003	Los Angeles, California, U.S.	Accidental fall from roof
Anita Mui	40	December 30, 2003	Happy Valley, Hong Kong	Cervical cancer

== 2004 ==
Name	Age	Date	Location	Cause of death
Alex MacNicol; Green on Red	43	January 3, 2004	San Francisco, California, U.S.	Unknown
John Guerin	64	January 5, 2004	West Hills, California, U.S.	Heart failure
Gian Costello Italian singer	69	January 7, 2004	Battaglia Terme, Italy	
Randy VanWarmer	48	January 12, 2004	Seattle, Washington, U.S.	Leukemia
Terje Bakken; Windir	25	January 14, 2004	Reppastølen, Sogndal, Norway	Hypothermia
Jimmi Lawrence; Hope of the States	26	January 15, 2004	Real World Studios, Box, England	Suicide by hanging
John Siomos	56	January 16, 2004	Brooklyn, New York, U.S.	
Czesław Niemen	64	January 17, 2004	Warsaw, Poland	Cancer
Billy May	87	January 22, 2004	San Juan Capistrano, California, U.S.	Heart attack
Mel Pritchard; Drummer/Percussionist for Barclay James Harvest	56	January 28, 2004	Greenfield, Greater Manchester, UK	Died in his sleep (Heart attack)
Rene DeKnight; The Delta Rhythm Boys	90	January 29, 2004	Shingle Springs, California, U.S.	Unknown
Soko Richardson; Ike & Tina Turner, John Mayall & the Bluesbreakers	64	January 29, 2004	Los Angeles, California, U.S.	Diabetes
Silverio Pisu Italian singer-songwriter, actor, writer, screenwriter, and voice actor	66	January 31, 2004	Milan, Italy	
Cornelius Bumpus; The Doobie Brothers, Steely Dan	58	February 3, 2004	Sioux City, Iowa, U.S.	Heart attack
Jason Raize	28	February 3, 2004	Yass, New South Wales, Australia	Suicide by hanging
Riki Maiocchi Italian singer, known for being one of the founders of the musical group Camaleonti	63	February 3, 2004	Milan, Italy	Long-term severe illness
Preston Love	82	February 12, 2004	Omaha, Nebraska, U.S.	Prostate cancer
Fiorella Bini Italian singer	70	February 15, 2004	Rome, Italy	
Doris Troy	67	February 16, 2004	Las Vegas, Nevada, U.S.	Emphysema
J.J. Malone	68	February 20, 2004	Hawaii, U.S.	Cancer
Les Gray; Mud	57	February 21, 2004	Algarve, Lagos, Portugal	Heart attack following throat cancer
Carl Anderson	58	February 23, 2004	Los Angeles, California, U.S.	Leukemia
Bob Mayo	53	February 23, 2004	Basel, Switzerland	Heart attack
A.C. Reed	77	February 24, 2004	Chicago, Illinois, U.S.	Cancer
Estelle Axton; Co-founder of Stax Records	85	February 25, 2004	Memphis, Tennessee, U.S.	Pneumonia
John McGeoch; Magazine, Siouxsie and the Banshees, Public Image Ltd, Visage, The Armoury Show	48	March 4, 2004	Cornwall, England	Heart attack
Peggy DeCastro; The DeCastro Sisters	82	March 6, 2004	Las Vegas, Nevada, U.S.	Lung cancer
Rust Epique; Crazy Town	36	March 9, 2004	Las Vegas, Nevada, U.S.	Aortic rupture
Dave Schulthise; The Dead Milkmen	47	March 10, 2004	North Salem, New York, U.S.	Suicide by drug overdose
Kyle Tullis; Bassist for Gram Parsons & the Fallen Angels, Steve Wariner, Vern Gosdin, The Oak Ridge Boys and many others	55	March 9, 2004	Nashville, Tennessee, U.S.	Liver and bone cancer
Edmund Sylvers; The Sylvers	47	March 11, 2004	Richmond, Virginia, U.S.	Lung cancer
Mary Ann Fisher; Ray Charles, The Raelettes	81	March 12, 2004	Louisville, Kentucky, U.S.	Natural causes
Johnny Bristol	65	March 21, 2004	Brighton Township, Michigan, U.S.	Natural causes
Jan Berry; Jan & Dean	62	March 26, 2004	Los Angeles, California, U.S.	Complications from a seizure
Adán Sánchez	19	March 27, 2004	Sinaloa, Mexico	Car crash
Timi Yuro	63	March 30, 2004	Las Vegas, Nevada, U.S.	Throat cancer
Paul Atkinson; The Zombies	58	April 1, 2004	Santa Monica, California, U.S.	Liver disease
Gabriella Ferri Italian singer-songwriter	61	April 3, 2004	Corchiano, Italy	Suicide by or Accidental fall
Niki Sullivan; Buddy Holly & The Crickets	66	April 6, 2004	Sugar Creek, Missouri, U.S.	Heart attack
Jeff Newman	62	April 7, 2004	Watertown, Tennessee, U.S.	Plane crash
Kim Arena Italian singer, member of Passengers	56	April 11, 2004	Milan, Italy	
Felix Haug; Drummer/Keyboardist for Double	52	May 1, 2004	Uster, Switzerland	Heart attack
Curtis Gordon	75	May 2, 2004	Moultrie, Georgia, U.S.	Unknown cause
Coxsone Dodd; Record producer	72	May 4, 2004	Kingston, Jamaica	Heart attack
Barney Kessel	80	May 6, 2004	San Diego, California, U.S.	Brain tumor
Rudi Maugeri; The Crew-Cuts	73	May 7, 2004	Las Vegas, Nevada, U.S.	Pancreatic cancer
Brenda Fassie	39	May 9, 2004	Johannesburg, South Africa	Cocaine overdose
John Whitehead; McFadden & Whitehead	55	May 11, 2004	Philadelphia, Pennsylvania, U.S.	Murdered
Clint Warwick; The Moody Blues	58	May 15, 2004	Birmingham, England	Hepatitis
Alex Nelson; Guitarist for Lizzy Borden	41	May 17, 2004	Palm Springs, Florida, U.S	Car crash
Gunnar Graps	52	May 17, 2004	Tallinn, Estonia	Heart attack
Elvin Jones	76	May 18, 2004	Englewood, New Jersey, U.S.	Heart failure
Gatemouth Moore	90	May 19, 2004	Yazoo City, Mississippi, U.S.	
Derek Frigo; Guitarist for Enuff Z'Nuff	37	May 28, 2004	Beverly Hills, California, U.S.	Drug overdose
Robert Quine	61	May 31, 2004	New York, U.S.	Suicide by heroin overdose
Steve Lacy	69	June 4, 2004	Boston, Massachusetts, U.S.	Liver cancer
Nino Manfredi Italian actor, director, screenwriter and singer-songwriter	83	June 4, 2004	Rome, Italy	Complications following a stroke
Quorthon; Bathory	38	June 7, 2004	Stockholm, Sweden	Heart failure
Bill Lowery; Record producer and music entrepreneur	79	June 8, 2004	Atlanta, Georgia, U.S.	Cancer
Ray Charles	73	June 10, 2004	Beverly Hills, California, U.S.	Complications of acute liver disease
Graeme Kelling; Deacon Blue	47	June 10, 2004	Glasgow, Glasgow City, Scotland	Pancreatic cancer
Jeff Reid; Bassist for SR-71	36	June 11, 2004	Baltimore, Maryland, U.S	Lung cancer
Jimmy Arnold; The Four Lads	72	June 15, 2004	Sacramento, California, U.S.	Lung cancer
Richard Tepp; Richard and the Young Lions	57	June 17, 2004	Hunter Mountain, New York	Leukemia
Syreeta Wright	57	July 6, 2004	Los Angeles, California, U.S.	Congestive heart failure
Ersel Hickey	70	July 9, 2004	Manhattan, New York, U.S.	Complications from gallbladder surgery
Arthur Kane; New York Dolls	55	July 13, 2004	Los Angeles, California, U.S.	Leukemia
Richard Anthony "Richie" Puente; Percussionist for Foxy	51	July 18, 2004	Miami-Dade County, Florida, U.S.	Brain injury/Died in his sleep
Serge Reggiani Italian-French actor and singer	82	July 22, 2004	Boulogne-Billancourt, France	
Illinois Jacquet	81	July 22, 2004	New York City, New York, U.S.	Heart attack
Totò Savio Italian composer	66	July 25, 2004	Rome, Italy	
George Williams; The Tymes	68	July 28, 2004	Maple Shade, New Jersey, U.S.	Unknown
Hunter Hancock; American disc jockey	88	August 4, 2004	Claremont, California, U.S.	Natural Causes
Rick James	56	August 6, 2004	Burbank, California, U.S.	Pulmonary and cardiac failure
Jak Airport; Classix Nouveaux, X-Ray Spex	49	August 13, 2004	East Sussex, England	Cancer
Htoo Ein Thin	41	August 14, 2004	Yangon, Myanmar	Heart disease
D-Roc "The Executioner"; Body Count	44	August 17, 2004	Duarte, California, U.S.	Lymphatic cancer/Lymphoma
Noble "Thin Man" Watts	78	August 24, 2004	De Land, Volusia, Florida, U.S.	Pneumonia and emphysema
Laura Branigan	52	August 26, 2004	East Quogue, New York, U.S.	Brain aneurysm
Carl Wayne; The Move	61	August 31, 2004	Birmingham, England	Esophageal cancer
Raful Neal	68	September 1, 2004	Baton Rouge, Louisiana, U.S.	Cancer
Wildman Steve; Comic entertainer, radio personality, promoter, MC and rock artist	78	September 1, 2004	Miami, Florida, U.S.	
Michael Connor; Keyboardist for Pure Prairie League	54	September 2, 2004	Sarasota, Florida, U.S.	Cancer
Robert Cotoia; Keyboardist for John Cafferty & the Beaver Brown Band	51	September 3, 2004	Providence, Rhode Island, U.S.	Liver disease
Jimmy Lewis; The Drifters	66	September 11, 2004	Los Angeles, California, U.S.	
Giuni Russo Italian singer-songwriter	53	September 14, 2004	Milan, Italy	Cancer
Johnny Ramone; The Ramones	55	September 15, 2004	Los Angeles, California, U.S.	Prostate cancer
Izora Armstead; The Weather Girls	62	September 16, 2004	San Leandro, California, U.S.	Heart failure
Skeeter Davis	72	September 19, 2004	Nashville, Tennessee, U.S.	Breast cancer
Gary Strater; Bassist for Starcastle	51	September 20, 2004	Champaign, Illinois, U.S.	Pancreatic cancer
Roy Drusky	74	September 23, 2004	Portland, Tennessee, U.S.	Lung cancer
Louis Satterfield; Earth, Wind & Fire	67	September 27, 2004	Chicago, Illinois, U.S.	Unknown
Bruce Palmer; Buffalo Springfield	58	October 1, 2004	Belleville, Ontario, Canada	Heart attack
Rodney Dangerfield	82	October 5, 2004	Los Angeles, California, U.S.	Complications after open heart replacement surgery
Clem Tholet; Rhodesian folk singer	56	October 6, 2004	Cape Town, Western Cape, South Africa	Died after a long illness
Miki Matsubara	44	October 7, 2004	Sakai, Osaka, Japan	Cervical cancer
William Henry "Pat" Best; The 4 Tunes	81	October 14, 2004	Roseville, California, U.S.	Unknown
Dave Godin; Record producer and co-founder of Soul City Records	68	October 15, 2004	Rotherham, England	Unknown
Doug Bennett; Doug & the Slugs	52	October 16, 2004	Calgary, Alberta, Canada	Cirrhosis of the liver
Greg Shaw; Fanzine publisher, music historian and record label owner, manager for Flamin' Groovies	55	October 19, 2004	Los Angeles, California, U.S.	Heart failure
C. P. Spencer; The Originals	66	October 20, 2004	Oak Park, Oakland, Michigan, U.S.	Heart attack
John Peel; English DJ	65	October 25, 2004	Cuzco, Peru	Heart attack
Bill Reed; The Diamonds	68	October 22, 2004	Toronto, Canada	Cancer
Terry Knight; Terry Knight and the Pack, Grand Funk Railroad	61	November 1, 2004	Temple, Texas, U.S.	Murder by stabbing
Mark Ledford; Pat Metheny Group	44	November 1, 2004	Los Angeles, California, U.S.	Heart disease
Mac Dre	34	November 1, 2004	Kansas City, Missouri, U.S.	Shot to death
Robert Heaton; New Model Army, Hawkwind	43	November 4, 2004	Bradford, West Yorkshire, U.K.	Head injury
Lenny Mayes; The Dramatics	53	November 7, 2004	Southfield, Michigan, U.S.	Heart attack
Bruno Bettinelli Italian composer and teacher	91	November 8, 2004	Milan, Italy	
John Balance; Coil, Psychic TV	42	November 13, 2004	Weston-super-Mare, Somerset, England	Fall
Ol' Dirty Bastard; Wu-Tang Clan	35	November 13, 2004	New York City, New York, U.S.	Accidental drug overdose
Cy Coleman	75	November 18, 2004	New York City, New York, U.S.	Cardiac arrest
Terry Melcher; Bruce & Terry, The Rip Chords	62	November 19, 2004	Beverly Hills, California, U.S.	Melanoma
Kevin Coyne	60	December 2, 2004	Nuremberg, Bavaria, Germany	Lung fibrosis
Nadine Renee; Planet Soul	32	December 2, 2004	Miami, Florida, U.S.	Complications following childbirth
Dimebag Darrell; Pantera, Damageplan	38	December 8, 2004	Columbus, Ohio, U.S.	Shot during the Columbus nightclub shooting
Jeffrey "Mayhem" Thompson; Head of security for Damageplan	40	December 8, 2004	Columbus, Ohio, U.S.	Shot during the Columbus nightclub shooting
Herbert Dreilich; Karat	62	December 12, 2004	Berlin, Germany	Liver cancer
Terzina "Delfina" Fasano The members of the Duo Fasano		December 15, 2004	Turin, Italy	
Freddie Perren; Record producer and arranger from The Jackson 5, The Sylvers and Peaches & Herb	61	December 16, 2004	Chatsworth, California, U.S.	Complications following a stroke
Dick Heckstall-Smith; Colosseum, The Graham Bond Organisation	70	December 17, 2004	London, England	Acute liver failure
Son Seals	62	December 20, 2004	Chicago, Illinois, U.S.	Complications of diabetes
Aki Sirkesalo	42	December 26, 2004	Khao Lak, Thailand	2004 Indian Ocean earthquake and tsunami
Mieszko Talarczyk; Nasum	30	December 26, 2004	Phi Phi Island, Thailand	2004 Indian Ocean earthquake and tsunami
Hank Garland	74	December 27, 2004	Orange Park, Florida, U.S.	Staph infection
Artie Shaw	94	December 30, 2004	Thousand Oaks, California, U.S.	Natural causes

== 2005 ==
Name	Age	Date	Location	Cause of death
David McNeil; The Larks	72	January 8, 2005	New Haven, Connecticut, U.S.	Unknown
Spencer Dryden; Jefferson Airplane, New Riders of the Purple Sage	66	January 11, 2005	Penngrove, California, U.S.	Stomach cancer
Jimmy Griffin; Bread	61	January 11, 2005	Franklin, Tennessee, U.S.	Complications due to cancer
Rocky Roberts American singer naturalized Italian	63	January 14, 2005	Rome, Italy	Lung cancer
Marko Busch; Dritte Wahl	35	January 17, 2005	Rostock, Germany	Stomach cancer
Consuelo Velázquez	88	January 17, 2005	Mexico City, Mexico	
Johnny Carson	79	January 23, 2005	Los Angeles, California, U.S.	Emphysema
Ray Peterson	69	January 25, 2005	Smyrna, Tennessee, U.S.	Cancer
Clarence Bassett; Shep and the Limelites	68	January 25, 2005	Richmond, Virginia, U.S.	Emphysema
Mark Evans; Drummer for Warrior Soul	48	January 26, 2005	Seething Wells, London, England	Murdered (Strangled and burned)
Jim Capaldi; Traffic	60	January 28, 2005	Westminster, London, England	Stomach cancer
Artūras Barysas; Vocalist for Ir Visa Tai Kas Yra Gražu Yra Gražu	50	January 28, 2005	Vilnius, Lithuania	
Eric Griffiths; The Quarrymen	64	January 29, 2005	Edinburgh, Scotland	Pancreatic cancer
David Lerchey; The Del-Vikings	67	January 29, 2005	Hallandale, Florida, U.S.	Cancer/Heart ailment
Wes Wehmiller; Duran Duran, Missing Persons	33	January 30, 2005	Los Angeles, California, U.S.	Thyroid cancer
Merle Kilgore	70	February 6, 2005	Mexico	Heart failure while undergoing experimental treatments for lung cancer
Keith Knudsen; The Doobie Brothers	56	February 8, 2005	Kentfield, California, U.S.	Pneumonia
Jimmy Smith	79	February 8, 2005	Scottsdale, Arizona, U.S.	Natural causes
Tyrone Davis	66	February 9, 2005	Chicago, Illinois, U.S.	Stroke
Sammi Smith	61	February 12, 2005	Oklahoma City, Oklahoma, U.S.	Emphysema
Joe Martin; The Willows	69	February 19, 2005	New York City, U.S.	Congestive heart failure
Ennio Melis Italian record producer	78	February 21, 2005	Rome, Italy	
Edward Patten; Gladys Knight & the Pips	65	February 25, 2005	Livonia, Michigan, U.S.	Stroke caused by diabetes
Franco Bracardi Italian actor, musician and comedian	67	February 27, 2005	Rome, Italy	
Chris Curtis; The Searchers	63	February 28, 2005	Liverpool, England	Died after a long illness
George "Wild Child" Butler	68	March 1, 2005	Windsor, Ontario, Canada	Pulmonary embolism
Joseph Dougherty Carter; Carter Family	78	March 2, 2005	Hiltons, Scott County, Virginia, U.S.	Unknown
Chris LeDoux	56	March 9, 2005	Casper, Wyoming, U.S.	Bile Duct Cancer
Danny Joe Brown; The Danny Joe Brown Band, Molly Hatchet	53	March 10, 2005	Davie, Florida, U.S.	Renal failure
Jackie Neal	37	March 10, 2005	Baton Rouge, Louisiana, U.S.	Murder by gunshot
Aurelio Fierro	81	March 11, 2005	Naples, Italy	Stroke
Lyn Collins	56	March 13, 2005	Pasadena, California, U.S.	Cardiac arrhythmia
Jakson Spires; Blackfoot	53	March 16, 2005	Fort Pierce, Florida, U.S.	Brain aneurysm
Renée Diggs; Starpoint	50	March 18, 2005	Annapolis, Maryland, U.S.	Complications of multiple sclerosis
Rod Price; Foghat	57	March 22, 2005	Wilton, New Hampshire, U.S.	Heart attack
Paul Hester; Crowded House, Split Enz	46	March 26, 2005	Melbourne, Victoria, Australia	Suicide by hanging
Rigo Tovar	58	March 27, 2005	Mexico City, Distrito Federal, Mexico	Cardiac arrest
Derrick Plourde; Lagwagon, Bad Astronaut, The Ataris, Mad Caddies, Rich Kids on LSD	33	March 30, 2005	Goleta, California	Suicide by gunshot
Billy "Bass Wolf"; Guitar Wolf	38	March 31, 2005	Tokyo, Japan	Heart attack
Barry Stern; Zoetrope, Trouble	45	April 1, 2005	Chicago, Illinois, U.S.	Complications following hip replacement surgery
Duke McFadden; Keyboardist for 707	49	April 5, 2005	Livonia, Detroit, Michigan	Heart problems
Grant Kitchings; The Ravens, The Drifters	66	April 5, 2005	The Bronx, New York	Diabetes
Johnnie Johnson	80	April 13, 2005	St. Louis, Missouri, U.S.	Kidney failure and pneumonia
John Fred; John Fred and His Playboy Band	63	April 14, 2005	New Orleans, Louisiana, U.S.	Complications from kidney transplant
Andrew Steele; Drummer for The Herd	63	April 18, 2005	Alaska, U.S.	Cancer
Stan Levey	79	April 19, 2005	Van Nuys, California, U.S.	Jaw cancer
Bryan Ottoson; Guitarist for American Head Charge	27	April 19, 2005	North Charleston, South Carolina, U.S.	Barbiturate overdose
Richard Lewis; The Silhouettes	71	April 19, 2005	Philadelphia, Pennsylvania, U.S.	Kidney failure
Jimmy Woode; Flip Phillips, Sarah Vaughan, Ella Fitzgerald, Charlie Parker, Duke Ellington etc...	78	April 23, 2005	Linden, New Jersey, U.S.	Complications following a surgery for a stomach aneurysm
Hasil Adkins	67	April 26, 2005	Boone County, West Virginia, U.S.	Hit by an ATV
Percy Heath; Modern Jazz Quartet	81	April 28, 2005	Southampton, New York, U.S.	Bone cancer
Jim Pash; The Surfaris	56	April 29, 2005	Yucca Valley, San Bernardino County, California, U.S.	Congestive heart failure
Johnnie Stewart; Television producer and music program from Top of the Pops	87	April 29, 2005	East Dereham, Norfolk, England	
Norma-Jean Wofford; Female rhythm guitarist for Bo Diddley	63	April 30, 2005	Fontana, California, U.S.	Unknown
Pierre Moerlen; Gong	52	May 3, 2005	Strasbourg, France	Natural causes
Neal Pattman	79	May 4, 2005	Athens, Georgia, U.S.	Bone cancer
David Wayne; Metal Church, Reverend	47	May 10, 2005	Tacoma, Washington, U.S.	Traffic accident
Frankie LaRocka; Bon Jovi, David Johansen, Bryan Adams, John Waite	51	May 12, 2005	New York City, New York, U.S.	Complications after heart surgery
Gianni Zullo Italian comedian, actor and singer	85	May 17, 2005	Pianello Val Tidone, Italy	
Mike Mahaffey; Self	38	May 25, 2005	Murfreesboro, Tennessee, U.S.	Died in his sleep/Unknown causes
Domenic Troiano; The James Gang, The Guess Who, Ronnie Hawkins	59	May 25, 2005	Toronto, Ontario, Canada	Prostate cancer
Eddie Albert	99	May 26, 2005	Pacific Palisades, Los Angeles, California, U.S.	Pneumonia/Alzheimer's Disease
Oscar Brown	78	May 29, 2005	Chicago, Illinois, U.S.	Osteomyelitis
Papa Touwtjie	36	June 9, 2005	Paramaribo, Suriname	Shot by his brother
Karl Mueller; Soul Asylum	41	June 17, 2005	Minneapolis, Minnesota, U.S.	Throat cancer
Johnny Reed; The Orioles	81	June 18, 2005	Lakewood, New Jersey	Natural causes
Chet Helms; Music promoter	62	June 25, 2005	San Francisco, California, U.S.	Stroke
Renaldo Benson; The Four Tops	69	July 1, 2005	Detroit, Michigan, U.S.	Lung cancer
Luther Vandross; Change	54	July 1, 2005	Edison, New Jersey, U.S.	Heart attack following a stroke
Hedy West	67	July 3, 2005	Philadelphia, Pennsylvania, U.S.	Cancer
Al Downing	65	July 4, 2005	Massachusetts, U.S.	Leukemia
Ray Davis; Parliament, Funkadelic	65	July 5, 2005	New Brunswick, New Jersey, U.S.	Respiratory problems
Shirley Goodman; Shirley and Company	69	July 5, 2005	Los Angeles, California, U.S.	Stroke
Dennis D'Ell; The Honeycombs	61	July 6, 2005	U.K.	Cancer
Keith Alexander; Carnivore	41	July 11, 2005	Shore Road, Bay Ridge, Brooklyn, U.S.	Traffic accident
Michael Dahlquist; Silkworm	39	July 14, 2005	Skokie, Illinois, U.S.	Vehicular reckless homicide
Patrick Sherry; Bad Beat Revue	29	July 20, 2005	The Warehouse, Leeds, England	Head trauma after a failed stage dive
Long John Baldry; Blues Incorporated	64	July 21, 2005	Vancouver, British Columbia, Canada	Severe chest infection
Eugene Record; The Chi-Lites	64	July 22, 2005	Chicago, Illinois, U.S.	Cancer
Dom Um Romão	79	July 27, 2005	Rio de Janeiro, Brazil	
Lucky Thompson	81	July 30, 2005	Seattle, Washington, U.S.	Alzheimer's disease
Loulie Jean Norman; Star Trek, Frank Sinatra, Elvis Presley, Sam Cooke, The Tokens etc...	92	August 2, 2005	Studio City, California, U.S.	Natural causes
Little Milton	70	August 4, 2005	Memphis, Tennessee, U.S.	Stroke
Carlo Little; The Rolling Stones	65	August 6, 2005	Cleadon, Tyne and Wear, England	Lung cancer
Detroit Junior	73	August 9, 2005	Chicago, Illinois, U.S.	Heart failure
John Loder; Sound engineer, record producer, founder of Southern Studios	59	August 12, 2005	London, England	Brain tumor
Francine Hurd Barker; Peaches & Herb	58	August 13, 2005	Hyattsville, Maryland, U.S.	Cancer
Billy More Italian singer	40	August 14, 2005	Milan, Italy	Leukemia acute (or fulminant)
Krzysztof Raczkowski; Vader	34	August 18, 2005	Olsztyn, Poland	Heart failure due to alcoholism
Steven Ronald Jensen; The Vandals	46	August 20, 2005	Maui, Hawaii	Barbiturate overdose
Robert Moog; Moog Synthesizer	71	August 21, 2005	Asheville, North Carolina, U.S.	Brain cancer
Harold Kalin; Kalin Twins	71	August 24, 2005	Waldorf, Maryland	Traffic accident
Davor "Moskri" Bobić; Lead rapper of Prti Bee Gee	27	August 25, 2005	Belgrade, Serbia	Heroin overdose
Denis D'Amour; Voivod	45	August 26, 2005	Montréal, Canada	Colon cancer
R.L. Burnside; Jon Spencer Blues Explosion	78	September 1, 2005	Memphis, Tennessee	Heart attack
Barry Cowsill; The Cowsills	50	September 2, 2005	New Orleans, Louisiana, U.S.	Drowning related to flooding during Hurricane Katrina
Eric Roche	37	September 6, 2005	Haverhill, Suffolk, England	Throat cancer
Sergio Endrigo	72	September 7, 2005	Rome, Italy	
Clarence "Gatemouth" Brown	81	September 10, 2005	Orange, Texas, U.S.	Lung cancer/Emphysema
Frank Fields	91	September 18, 2005	Zachary, Louisiana, U.S.	
Willie Hutch	60	September 19, 2005	Dallas, Texas, U.S.	Natural causes
Paul Pena	55	October 1, 2005	San Francisco, California, U.S.	Diabetes and pancreatitis
Hamilton Camp	70	October 2, 2005	Los Angeles, California, U.S.	Cardiac tamponade and dissecting aortic hemorrhage
Mike Gibbins; Badfinger	56	October 4, 2005	Oviedo, Florida, U.S.	Died in his sleep/Brain aneurysm
Shirley Ellis	76	October 5, 2005	Bronx, New York City, U.S.	
Paul "Wine" Jones	59	October 9, 2005	Jackson, Mississippi, U.S.	Cancer
Nick Hawkins; Big Audio Dynamite	40	October 10, 2005	Laa Vegas, Nevada, U.S.	Heart attack
Sonji Clay-Glover	59	October 11, 2005	Chicago, Illinois, U.S.	Natural causes
Baker Knight	72	October 12, 2005	Birmingham, Alabama, U.S.	Natural causes
David Reilly; God Lives Underwater	34	October 16, 2005	Pennsylvania, U.S.	Stomach rupture leading to coma
Sabú	54	October 16, 2005	Mexico City, Distrito Federal, Mexico	Lung cancer
Shirley Horn; Miles Davis, Dizzy Gillespie, Toots Thielemans, Ron Carter, Carmen McRae, Wynton Marsalis and others	71	October 20, 2005	Cheverly, Maryland, U.S.	Complications of diabetes
Franky Gee; Captain Jack	43	October 22, 2005	Palma de Mallorca, Spain	Cerebral hemorrhage/Coma
Janita Claassen; South African Pop singer	58	October 24, 2005	Pretoria, South Africa	Lung cancer
Michael Arnone; The Duprees	63	October 27, 2005	Wall Township, New Jersey, U.S.	Unknown
David Townsend; The Isley Brothers, Surface, Sunrize, Marvin Gaye	50	October 26, 2005	Northridge, California, U.S.	Drug overdose
John "Beatz" Holohan; Bayside	31	October 31, 2005	Cheyenne, Wyoming, U.S.	Traffic accident
Milt Holland	88	November 4, 2005	Los Angeles, California, U.S.	Alzheimer's disease and kidney failure
Link Wray	76	November 5, 2005	Copenhagen, Denmark	Heart failure
Johnny Tanner; The Five Royales	79	November 8, 2005	Winston-Salem, Forsyth, North Carolina, U.S.	Cancer
Al Frazier; The Rivingtons	75	November 13, 2005	Las Vegas, Nevada, U.S.	Heart attack
Chris Whitley	45	November 20, 2005	Houston, Texas, U.S.	Lung cancer
Jay Owens	58	November 26, 2005	Orlando, Florida, U.S.	Complications of diabetes
Mark Craney; Gino Vannelli, Jethro Tull, Eric Burdon etc...	53	November 26, 2005	Sherman Oaks, California, U.S.	Complications from diabetes and pneumonia
Joe Jones	79	November 27, 2005	Los Angeles, California, U.S.	Complications following quadruple bypass surgery
Tony Meehan; The Shadows	62	November 28, 2005	Paddington, London, England	Head injuries following a fall
Gerry Humphrys; The Loved Ones	64	December 2, 2005	London, England	Heart attack
Don Charles	71	December 4, 2005	Herstmonceux, East Sussex, England	Unknown
Danny Williams	63	December 6, 2005	England, U.K.	Lung cancer
Mike Botts; Bread	61	December 9, 2005	Burbank, California, U.S.	Colon cancer
Richard "Bomer" Manzullo; Rich Kids on LSD	38	December 12, 2005	Summerland, California, U.S.	Heart failure from drug abuse
Ugo Molinari Singer	76	December 19, 2005	Aosta, Italy	

== 2006 ==
Name	Age	Date	Location	Cause of death
Bryan Harvey; House of Freaks, Gutterball	49	January 1, 2006	Richmond, Virginia, U.S.	Murder during home robbery
Michael S. Smith	59	January 2, 2006	Washington, D.C, U.S.	Prostate cancer
Alex St. Clair; Captain Beefheart And The Magic Band	64	January 5, 2006	Lancaster, California, U.S.	Heart attack
Lou Rawls	72	January 6, 2006	Los Angeles, California, U.S.	Lung cancer
Mark Spoon; Jam & Spoon	39	January 11, 2006	Berlin, Germany	Heart attack
Dave Lepard; Crashdïet	25	January 13, 2006	Uppsala, Sweden	Suicide by hanging
Bob Weinstock; Record producer, founded Prestige Records	77	January 14, 2006	Boca Raton, Florida, U.S.	Diabetes
Wilson Pickett; The Falcons	64	January 19, 2006	Reston, Virginia, U.S.	Heart attack
Janette Carter; Carter Family	82	January 22, 2006	Kingsport, Tennessee, U.S.	Unknown
Fayard Nicholas; The Nicholas Brothers	91	January 24, 2006	Los Angeles, California, U.S.	Pneumonia following a stroke
Gene McFadden; McFadden & Whitehead	56	January 27, 2006	Mount Airy, Philadelphia, Pennsylvania, U.S.	Liver and lung cancer
Brent Dowe; The Melodians	59	January 29, 2006	Jamaica	Heart attack
Jason Sears; Rich Kids on LSD	38	January 31, 2006	Tijuana, Mexico	Pulmonary thrombosis.
Bobby Moore; Bobby Moore & the Rhythm Aces	75	February 1, 2006	Montgomery, Alabama, U.S.	Kidney failure
Elton Dean; Soft Machine	60	February 8, 2006	London, England	Heart and liver problems
Johnny Ross; Baby Huey & the Babysitters	63	February 9, 2006	Hobart, Indiana, U.S.	Heart failure following appendicitis
Bob Riley; Grace Pool	50	February 9, 2006	New York City, U.S	Heart attack
J Dilla; Slum Village, Soulquarians	32	February 10, 2006	Los Angeles, California, U.S.	Cardiac arrest
Lynden David Hall	31	February 14, 2006	Wandsworth, South West London, England	Complications from a stem cell transplant
Shoshana Damari Israeli singer and actress	82	February 14, 2006	Tel Aviv, Israel	Complications from pneumonia
Bill Cowsill; The Cowsills, The Blue Shadows, Blue Northern	58	February 18, 2006	Calgary, Alberta, U.S.	Emphysema
Anthony Burger	44	February 22, 2006	Miami, Florida, U.S.	Heart attack while performing
Yuri Morozov	57	February 23, 2006	Saint Petersburg, Russia	
Johnny Jackson; Drummer for The Jackson 5	50	March 1, 2006	Gary, Indiana, U.S.	Stabbing
Jack Wild	53	March 1, 2006	Tebworth, Bedfordshire, England	Oral cancer
Willie Kent	70	March 2, 2006	Englewood, Illinois, U.S.	Colon cancer
King Floyd	61	March 6, 2006	Jackson, California, U.S.	Complications of stroke and diabetes
Johnny Williams	99	March 6, 2006	Chicago, Illinois, U.S.	
Hanka Bielicka	90	March 9, 2006	Warsaw, Poland	Aortic aneurysm/After operation
Pío Leyva; Buena Vista Social Club	88	March 22, 2006	Havana, Cuba	
Buck Owens; Buck Owens and the Buckaroos	76	March 25, 2006	Bakersfield, California, U.S.	Heart attack
Rocío Dúrcal	61	March 25, 2006	Torrelodones, Madrid, Spain	Uterus cancer
Nikki Sudden; Swell Maps	49	March 26, 2006	New York City, New York, U.S.	Heart attack
Peter Wells; Rose Tattoo	59	March 27, 2006	Sydney, Australia	Prostate cancer
Don Alias	66	March 28, 2006	New York City, New York, U.S.	No cause given
Jackie McLean; Art Blakey, Dizzy Gillespie, Miles Davis etc...	74	March 31, 2006	Hartford, Connecticut, U.S.	Died after a long illness
Martin Gilks; The Wonder Stuff	41	April 3, 2006	London, England	Traffic accident
Gene Pitney	66	April 5, 2006	Cardiff, Wales	Heart attack
Henry Lewy	79	April 8, 2006	Prescott, Arizona, U.S.	Stroke and following heart surgery
June Pointer; The Pointer Sisters	52	April 11, 2006	Los Angeles, California, U.S.	Cancer
Proof; Eminem, D12	32	April 11, 2006	Detroit, Michigan, U.S.	Murder by gunshot
Cees Kalis; Earth & Fire	56	April 16, 2006	Rhoon, Netherlands	Unknown
Phil Walden; Record producer and co-founder of the Macon, Georgia-based on Capricorn Records	66	April 22, 2006	Atlanta, Georgia, U.S.	Cancer
Bonnie Owens	76	April 24, 2006	Bakersfield, California, U.S.	Alzheimer's disease
Danny McKenna; Toby Beau, Bob Seger, Steve Miller Band, The Doobie Brothers	54	April 26, 2006	McAllen, Texas, U.S.	Suicide by gunshot
Johnny Paris; Frontman/Saxophonist for Johnny and the Hurricanes	65	May 1, 2006	Ann Arbor, Michigan, U.S.	Sepsis/Pneumonia
Big Hawk	36	May 1, 2006	Houston, Texas, U.S.	Shot to death
Grant McLennan; The Go-Betweens	48	May 6, 2006	Brisbane, Queensland, Australia	Heart attack
Steve Bender; Record producer and member of Dschinghis Khan	59	May 7, 2006	Munich, Germany	Lung cancer
Soraya	37	May 10, 2006	Miami, Florida, U.S.	Breast cancer
John Hicks; Art Blakey, Betty Carter, Woody Herman, etc...	64	May 10, 2006	New York City, New York, U.S.	Internal bleeding
Johnnie Wilder, Jr. Heatwave	56	May 13, 2006	Dayton, Ohio, U.S.	Complications of paralysis
Steve Cooper; S.A. Slayer	47	May 14, 2006	San Antonio, Texas, U.S.	Kidney failure due to complications of Type 1 diabetes
Freddie Garrity; Freddie and the Dreamers	69	May 19, 2006	Bangor, Wales	Emphysema
Billy Walker	77	May 21, 2006	Fort Deposit, Alabama, U.S.	Car crash
Desmond Dekker	64	May 25, 2006	Thornton Heath, Croydon, England	Heart attack
Vince McAllister; Pentagram	51	May 26, 2006	San Francisco Bay Area, California, U.S.	Neck cancer
Rocío Jurado	62	June 1, 2006	Alcobendas, Madrid, Spain	Pancreatic cancer
Vince Welnick; Grateful Dead, The Tubes	55	June 2, 2006	Sonoma County, California, U.S.	Suicide
Johnny Grande; Bill Haley & His Comets	76	June 3, 2006	Clarksville, Tennessee, U.S.	Cancer
Billy Preston	59	June 6, 2006	Scottsdale, Arizona, U.S.	Respiratory failure, stemming from pericarditis
Drafi Deutscher	60	June 9, 2006	Frankfurt, Essen, Germany	Heart failure
Freddie Gorman; The Originals	67	June 13, 2006	Palmdale, California, U.S.	Lung cancer
Betty Curtis Italian singer	70	June 15, 2006	Lecco, Italy	
Duane Roland; Molly Hatchet	52	June 19, 2006	St. Augustine, Florida, U.S.	Natural causes
Claydes Charles Smith; Kool & the Gang	57	June 20, 2006	Maplewood, New Jersey, U.S.	Undisclosed illness
Back Alley John	51	June 22, 2006	Calgary, Alberta, Canada	Respiratory disease
Arif Mardin; Music producer	74	June 25, 2006	New York City, New York, U.S.	Pancreatic cancer
Johnny Jenkins	67	June 26, 2006	Bibb County, Georgia, U.S.	Stroke
Joe Weaver	71	July 5, 2006	Southfield, Michigan, U.S.	Stroke
Al Hodge; The Onyx	55	July 6, 2006	Cornwall, England	Cancer
Syd Barrett; Pink Floyd	60	July 7, 2006	Cambridge, Cambridgeshire, England	Pancreatic cancer
Milan Williams; Commodores	58	July 9, 2006	Houston, Texas, U.S.	Cancer
Sam Myers	70	July 17, 2006	Dallas, Texas, U.S.	Throat cancer
Herbert Kalin; Kalin Twins	72	July 21, 2006	Waldorf Charles County, Maryland, U.S.	Heart attack
Jessie Mae Hemphill	82	July 22, 2006	Memphis, Tennessee, U.S.	Complications from an ulcer
Floyd Dixon	77	July 26, 2006	Orange County, U.S.	Kidney failure
Yoñlu	16	July 26, 2006	Porto Alegre, Rio Grande do Sul, Brazil	Suicide
Arthur Lee; Love	61	August 3, 2006	Memphis, Tennessee, U.S.	Leukemia
Richie Barrett; The Valentines	73	August 3, 2006	Gladwyne, Pennsylvania, U.S.	Pancreatic cancer
John Locke; Nazareth, Spirit	62	August 4, 2006	Ojai, California, U.S.	Cancer/Lymphoma
Moacir Santos	80	August 6, 2006	Pasadena, California, U.S.	Stroke
Barbara George	63	August 10, 2006	Chauvin, Louisiana, U.S.	Lung infection
Jon Nödtveidt; Dissection, Nifelheim, Ophthalamia, The Black	31	August 13, 2006	Hässelby, Sweden	Suicide by gunshot.
Johnny Duncan	67	August 14, 2006	Fort Worth, Texas, U.S.	Heart attack
Bruce Gary; The Knack	55	August 22, 2006	Tarzana, California, U.S.	Non-Hodgkin lymphoma
Maynard Ferguson	78	August 23, 2006	Ventura, California, U.S.	Kidney and liver failure
Jesse Pintado; Napalm Death, Terrorizer, Lock Up, Brujeria	37	August 27, 2006	Ridderkerk, Netherlands	Liver failure
Pip Pyle; Hatfield and the North, National Health, Gong	56	August 28, 2006	Paris, France	Natural causes
Jumpin' Gene Simmons	69	August 29, 2006	Tupelo, Mississippi, U.S.	After a long illness
Dewey Redman	75	September 2, 2006	Brooklyn, New York, U.S.	Liver failure
Al Casey	69	September 17, 2006	Phoenix, Arizona, U.S.	
Danny Flores; The Champs	77	September 19, 2006	Huntington Beach, California, U.S.	Pneumonia
Boz Burrell; Bad Company, King Crimson	60	September 21, 2006	Marbella, Spain	Heart attack
Etta Baker	93	September 23, 2006	Fairfax, Virginia, U.S.	
Henry Townsend	96	September 24, 2006	Mequon, Wisconsin, U.S.	
Jamie Lyons; Singer for The Music Explosion	57	September 25, 2006	Mansfield, Ohio, U.S.	Heart failure
Prentiss Barnes; The Moonglows	81	October 1, 2006	Magnolia, Mississippi, U.S.	Traffic accident
Abraham Afewerki	40	October 7, 2006	Massawa, Eritrea	Drowned
Larissa "Strickland" Stolarchuk; L-Seven, Laughing Hyenas	46	October 9, 2006	North Port, Florida, U.S.	Drug overdose
Jared Anderson; Morbid Angel, Hate Eternal	31	October 14, 2006	Covington, Kentucky, U.S.	Unspecified cause/Died in his sleep
Freddy Fender	69	October 14, 2006	Corpus Christi, Texas, U.S.	Lung cancer
Pete Graves; The Moonglows	76	October 15, 2006	New York, United States	Natural causes
Lionel Mattice; Bassist for Johnny and the Hurricanes	67	October 16, 2006	Toledo, Ohio, United States	Unknown
Andrea Parodi Italian singer and record producer for Tazenda	51	October 17, 2006	Quartu Sant'Elena, Italy	Cancer
Snooky Pryor	87	October 18, 2006	Cape Girardeau, Missouri, U.S.	
Sandy West; The Runaways	47	October 21, 2006	San Dimas, California, U.S.	Lung cancer
Bruno Lauzi Italian singer- songwriter, composer, cabaret artist, poet and writer	69	October 24, 2006	Peschiera Borromeo, Italy	Long illness
Eddie Medora; Guitarist for The Sunrays	61	October 27, 2006	Pacific Palisades, California, U.S.	Heart attack
Chris Williams; Drummer for Pat McGee Band	39	October 28, 2006	Richmond, Virginia, U.S.	Heart condition
Paul Mauriat	81	November 3, 2006	Perpignan, Pyrénées-Orientales, France	Unknown
Jance Garfat; Bassist for Dr. Hook	62	November 6, 2006	Union City, New Jersey, U.S.	Motorcycle accident
Gerald Levert; LeVert	40	November 10, 2006	Cleveland, Ohio, U.S.	Drug induced heart attack
Mario Merola Italian singer and film actor	72	November 12, 2006	Castellammare di Stabia, Italy	Heart attacks/cardiorespiratory failure
Annie Laurie	82	November 13, 2006	Titusville, Florida, U.S.	
Ruth Brown	78	November 17, 2006	Henderson, Nevada, U.S.	Heart attack and stroke
Flo Sandon's Italian singer	82	November 17, 2006	Rome, Italy	
Robert Lockwood Jr.	91	November 21, 2006	Cleveland, Ohio, U.S.	Cerebral aneurysm and stroke
Walter Booker	72	November 24, 2006	Manhattan, New York, U.S.	
Valentín Elizalde	27	November 25, 2006	Reynosa, Tamaulipas, Mexico	Shot to death
Tony Silvester; The Main Ingredient	65	November 27, 2006	Los Angeles, California, U.S.	Multiple myeloma
Mariska Veres; Shocking Blue	59	December 2, 2006	The Hague, Netherlands	Gall bladder cancer
Logan Whitehurst; The Velvet Teen	29	December 3, 2006	Los Banos, California, U.S.	Brain cancer
Darren Brown; Mega City Four	44	December 6, 2006	Tooting, London, England	Brain blood clot
Jay McShann	90	December 7, 2006	Kansas City, Missouri, U.S.	Undisclosed
Stefano Ruffini Italian singer	43	December 7, 2006	Naples, Italy	
Homesick James	96	December 13, 2006	Springfield, Missouri, U.S.	Heart attack
Ahmet Ertegun; Record producer, record label executive and co-founder of Atlantic Records	83	December 14, 2006	New York City, New York, U.S.	Injuries from an accidental fall
Denis Payton; The Dave Clark Five	63	December 17, 2006	Bournemouth, Dorset, England	Cancer
James Brown; The Famous Flames, The J.B.'s	73	December 25, 2006	Atlanta, Georgia, U.S.	Congestive heart failure resulting from complications of pneumonia

== 2007 ==
Name	Age	Date	Location	Cause of death
Tad Jones	54	January 1, 2007	New Orleans, Louisiana, U.S.	Fall
Del Reeves	73	January 1, 2007	Centerville, Tennessee, U.S.	Emphysema
Sneaky Pete Kleinow; The Flying Burrito Brothers, Sir Walter Raleigh & The Coupons	72	January 6, 2007	Petaluma, California, U.S.	Alzheimer's disease
Chris Aylmer; Samson	58	January 9, 2007	United Kingdom, London, England	Throat cancer
Alice Coltrane	69	January 12, 2007	Los Angeles, California, U.S.	Respiratory failure
Michael Brecker	57	January 13, 2007	New York City, New York, U.S.	Leukemia
Doyle Holly; The Buckaroos	70	January 13, 2007	Nashville, Tennessee, U.S.	Prostate cancer
Colin Thurston; Producer, record engineer	59	January 15, 2007	London, England	Long illness
Thornton James "Pookie" Hudson; The Spaniels	72	January 16, 2007	Capitol Heights, Maryland, U.S.	Cancer
Gary Phillips; The Greg Kihn Band	59	January 17, 2007	United States	Cancer
Brent Liles; Social Distortion, Agent Orange	43	January 18, 2007	Los Angeles, California, U.S.	Traffic accident
Denny Doherty; The Mamas & the Papas	66	January 19, 2007	Mississauga, Ontario, Canada	Kidney failure
Esmond Edwards; Record producer, record engineering and co-founded of Prestige Records	79	January 20, 2007	Santa Barbara, California, U.S.	
Crown Prince Waterford	90	February 1, 2007	Jacksonville, Florida, U.S.	
Billy Henderson; The Spinners	67	February 2, 2007	Daytona Beach, Florida, U.S.	Diabetes
Joe Hunter; The Funk Brothers	79	February 2, 2007	Detroit, Michigan, U.S.	Natural causes
Barbara McNair	72	February 4, 2007	Los Angeles, California, U.S.	Throat cancer
Frankie Laine	93	February 6, 2007	San Diego, California, U.S.	Heart failure
Alan "Nidge" Miller "Blitz"	48	February 10, 2007	Austin County, Texas, U.S.	Hit by a car on a freeway
Dino Sarti Italian singer and comedian	70	February 11, 2007	Bentivoglio, Bologna, Italy	
Jimmy Campbell "The Kirkbys"	63	February 12, 2007	Liverpool, UK	No cause given
Eldee Young; Young-Holt Unlimited	71	February 12, 2007	Bangkok, Thailand	Heart attack
John O'Banion	59	February 14, 2007	Los Angeles, California, U.S.	Blunt force trauma as a result of being hit by a car while touring in New Orleans, Louisiana
John Lane; Bill Haley & His Comets	76	February 18, 2007	Harlingen, Texas, U.S	
Ian Wallace; King Crimson	60	February 22, 2007	Los Angeles, California, U.S.	Esophageal cancer
Donnie Brooks	71	February 23, 2007	Panorama City, California	Heart attack after a long illness
Billy Thorpe; Billy Thorpe and the Aztecs	60	February 28, 2007	Sydney, Australia	Heart attack
Paul deLay	55	March 7, 2007	Portland, Oregon, U.S.	Leukaemia
Brad Delp; Boston	55	March 9, 2007	Atkinson, New Hampshire, U.S.	Suicide by carbon monoxide poisoning
Betty Hutton	86	March 11, 2007	Palm Springs, California, U.S.	Colon cancer
Carol MacDonald; Guitarist for Goldie & the Gingerbreads	69	March 12, 2007	New York City, U.S.	Liver disease
Carol Richards	84	March 16, 2007	Vero Beach, Florida, U.S.	Kidney failure
Vince Hozier; The Sunrays	61	March 18, 2007	Portland, Oregon	No cause given
Luther Ingram	69	March 19, 2007	Belleville, Illinois, U.S.	Heart failure
Cha Burns; Fingerprintz, The Silencers, Adam Ant	50	March 26, 2007	Prestatyn, Wales	Lung cancer
Joe Sentieri Italian singer-songwriter	82	March 27, 2007	Pescara, Italy	cerebral hemorrhage
Tony Scott	85	March 28, 2007	Rome, Italy	Prostate cancer
Phil Cordell	59	March 31, 2007	London, England	No cause given
Danny Barcelona; Louis Armstrong	77	April 1, 2007	San Gabriel, California	Cancer
Karl “Charly Bianco” Blass Schrott nach 8	64	April 1 2007		
Mark St. John; Kiss	51	April 5, 2007	New York City, New York, U.S.	Cerebral hemorrhage
Lefty Bates; The El Dorados, The Flamingos, Jimmy Reed, John Lee Hooker, Buddy Guy, Etta James etc...	87	April 7, 2007	Chicago, Illinois, U.S.	Coronary artery disease/Diabetes
Dakota Staton	76	April 10, 2007	New York, U.S.	Stroke
Bill Guffey; Shooting Star	54	April 12, 2007	Kansas City, Kansas, United States	Complications from a liver transplant
Don Ho	76	April 14, 2007	Honolulu, Hawaii, U.S.	Congestive heart failure
James B. Davis; The Dixie Hummingbirds	90	April 17, 2007	Philadelphia, Pennsylvania, U.S.	Heart ailment
Andrew Hill	75	April 20, 2007	Jersey City, New Jersey, U.S.	Lung cancer
Lobby Loyde; The Purple Hearts, Wild Cherries, Billy Thorpe and the Aztecs, Rose Tattoo	65	April 21, 2007	Box Hill, Victoria, Australia	Lung cancer
San Fadyl; The Ladybug Transistor	31	April 26, 2007	Zurich, Switzerland	
Bobby Pickett; The Crypt-Kickers	69	April 27, 2007	Los Angeles, California, U.S.	Leukemia
Zola Taylor; The Platters	69	April 30, 2007	Riverside, California, U.S.	Pneumonia
Wolfgang Jäger; Extrabreit	54	May 3, 2007	Hagen, Germany	
Big Joe Duskin	86	May 6, 2007	Avondale, Ohio, U.S.	Diabetes
Carey Bell	70	May 6, 2007	Chicago, Illinois, U.S.	Heart failure
Carolyn Johnson; The Exciters	62	May 7, 2007	Lakeland, Florida, U.S.	No cause given
Carson Whitsett; Record producer for The Imperial Show Band	62	May 8, 2007	Jackson, Mississippi, U.S.	Brain cancer
Keith Girdler; Blueboy	46	May 15, 2007	Reading, Berkshire, England	Cancer
Yoyoy Villame	74	May 18, 2007	Las Piñas, Philippines	Cardiac arrest
Izumi Sakai; Zard	40	May 27, 2007	Shinjuku, Tokyo, Japan	Accidental fall
Tony Thompson; Hi-Five	31	June 1, 2007	Waco, Texas, U.S.	Chlorodifluoromethane
John Pike; Ra Ra Riot	23	June 3, 2007	Massachusetts, U.S.	Drowned
Freddie Scott	74	June 4, 2007	Jamaica, New York, U.S.	Heart disease
Lynne Randell	57	June 8, 2007	Melbourne, Australia	Suicide
Richard Bell; The Band, Full Tilt Boogie Band	61	June 15, 2007	Toronto, Ontario, Canada	Multiple myeloma
Donna King; The King Sisters	88	June 16, 2007	Plano, Texas, U.S.	Unknown
Bill Barber	87	June 18, 2007	Bronxville, New York, U.S.	Heart failure
Hank Medress; The Tokens	68	June 18, 2007	New York City, New York, U.S.	Lung cancer
Antonio Aguilar	88	June 19, 2007	Mexico City, Distrito Federal, Mexico	Pneumonia
Natasja Saad	33	June 24, 2007	Spanish Town, Saint Catherine, Jamaica	Traffic accident
George McCorkle; Marshall Tucker Band	60	June 29, 2007	Lebanon, Tennessee, U.S.	Cancer
Rolandas Janavičius; Rondo	37	June 30, 2007	Klaipėda, Lithuania	
Beverly Sills	78	July 2, 2007	Manhattan, New York City, U.S.	Lung cancer
Boots Randolph	80	July 3, 2007	Nashville, Tennessee, U.S.	Brain hemorrhage
Bill Pinkney; The Drifters	81	July 4, 2007	Daytona Beach, Florida, U.S.	Heart attack
X1	28	July 4, 2007	Las Vegas, Nevada, U.S.	Unknown
Steven Rappaport; The Ran-Dells	65	July 4, 2007	Villas, New Jersey, U.S.	Heart attack
George Melly	80	July 5, 2007	London, England, United Kingdom	Lung cancer & Emphysema
Kelly Johnson; Girlschool	49	July 15, 2007	Clapham, London, England	Spinal cancer
Caterina Bueno Italian singer and folk music historian		July 16, 2007	Florence, Italy	
Ron Miller	74	July 23, 2007	Santa Monica, California, U.S.	Cardiac arrest
Trevor Butler; Bottom of the Hudson	27	July 29, 2007	Clinton, North Carolina, U.S.	Traffic accident
Lee Hazlewood	78	August 4, 2007	Henderson, Nevada, U.S.	Renal cancer
Clarence Tex Walker; The Coasters	61	August 8, 2007	Woodstock, Oxfordshire, England	Heart attack
Jon Lucien	65	August 14, 2007	Orlando, Florida, U.S.	Respiratory failure
Max Roach	83	August 16, 2007	New York City, New York, U.S.	Complications from Alzheimer's and dementia
Hilly Kristal; Founder of CBGB, manager for The Dead Boys	75	August 28, 2007	New York City, New York, U.S.	Lung cancer
Kip Anderson	69	August 29, 2007	Anderson, South Carolina, U.S.	
Carter Albrecht; Edie Brickell & New Bohemians	30	September 3, 2007	Dallas, Texas, U.S.	Shot and killed
Janis Martin	67	September 3, 2007	Durham, North Carolina, U.S.	Cancer
Gigi Sabani Italian impersonator, television host, and singer	54	September 4, 2007	Rome, Italy	Heart attack
Luciano Pavarotti	71	September 6, 2007	Modena, Italy	Pancreatic cancer
Hughie Thomasson; Outlaws, Lynyrd Skynyrd	55	September 9, 2007	Brooksville, Florida, U.S.	Heart attack
Willie Tee	63	September 11, 2007	New Orleans, Louisiana, U.S.	Colon cancer
Joe Zawinul; Weather Report	75	September 11, 2007	Vienna, Austria	Skin cancer
Bobby Byrd; The Famous Flames, The JB's	73	September 12, 2007	Loganville, Georgia, U.S.	Cancer
Pepsi Tate; Tigertailz	42	September 18, 2007	Penarth, Wales	Pancreatic cancer
Patrick Bourque; Bass guitarist for Emerson Drive	29	September 25, 2007	Montreal, Quebec, Canada	Suicide
George Malone; The Monotones	67	October 5, 2007	Phoenix, Maricopa County, Arizona, U.S.	
Jacqueline "Lady Jaye" Breyer; Psychic TV	38	October 9, 2007	Brooklyn, New York, U.S.	Heart arrhythmia
Dickie Threatt; The Five Keys	69	October 9, 2007	Newport News, Virginia, U.S.	Unknown
Backwards Sam Firk	64	October 11, 2007	Mill Spring, North Carolina, U.S.	Heart attack
Big Moe	33	October 14, 2007	Houston, Texas, U.S.	Heart attack
Toše Proeski	26	October 16, 2007	Nova Gradiška, Croatia	Car accident
Lucky Dube	43	October 18, 2007	Rosettenville, Johannesburg Gauteng, South Africa	Murder
Yolanda "La La" Brown	21	October 19, 2007	Milwaukee, Wisconsin, U.S.	Shot
Paul Raven; Killing Joke, Prong, Ministry, Zilch	46	October 20, 2007	Geneva, Switzerland	Heart attack
Paul Fox; The Ruts	56	October 21, 2007	London, England	Lung cancer
Lance Hahn; Cringer, J Church	40	October 21, 2007	Austin, Texas, U.S.	Nephropathy complications
Linda S. Stein; American talent agent	62	October 30, 2007	Manhattan, New York, U.S.	Murder by blunt impact trauma to head and neck
Joe Verscharen; The Skyliners	67	November 2, 2007	Atlanta, Georgia, U.S.	Cancer
Hans Sanders; Bots	61	November 3, 2007	North Brabant, Netherlands (unclear)	Complications from a debilitating illness
Norman Mershon; Tycoon	57	November 7, 2007	West Orange, New Jersey, U.S.	Liver disease
John Petersen; Harpers Bizarre, The Beau Brummels	65	November 11, 2007	Sierra Madre, California, U.S.	
Jim Ford	66	November 18, 2007	Fort Bragg, California, U.S.	
Kevin DuBrow; Quiet Riot	52	November 19, 2007	Las Vegas, Nevada, U.S.	Drug overdose
Ernest "Doc" Paulin	100	November 25, 2007	Marrero, Louisiana, U.S.	
Cecil Payne	84	November 27, 2004	Stratford, New Jersey, U.S.	Prostate cancer
Fred Chichin; Les Rita Mitsouko	53	November 28, 2007	Villejuif, France	Heart failure (complications of cancer)
Zayda Peña; Zayda y los Culpables	34	December 2, 2007	Matamoros, Tamaulipas, Mexico	Shot in the hospital while being treated
Sergio Gomez; K-Paz De La Sierra	34	December 2, 2007	Morelia, Mexico	Kidnapped and tortured to death
Pimp C UGK	33	December 4, 2007	West Hollywood, California, U.S.	Heavy usage of Lean, and his sleep apnea condition.
Lynette Knackstedt; Skankin' Pickle	37	December 7, 2007	San Francisco, California, U.S.	Drug overdose
Ike Turner; Kings of Rhythm, Ike & Tina Turner	76	December 12, 2007	San Marcos, California, U.S.	Drug overdose
Frank Morgan	73	December 14, 2007	Minneapolis, Minnesota, U.S.	Colorectal cancer
Dan Fogelberg	56	December 16, 2007	Deer Isle, Maine, U.S.	Prostate cancer
Damien "Damo" Morris; Vocalist for the Red Shore	27	December 19, 2007	Off the Pacific Highway just north of Coffs Harbour, New South Wales, Australia	Bus crash
Antonio Basurto Italian singer	90	December 20, 2007	Rome, Italy	
Lydia Mendoza	91	December 20, 2007	San Antonio, Texas, U.S.	Natural Causes
Joe Ames; Ames Brothers	86	December 22, 2007	Eltville, Germany	Heart attack
Oscar Peterson	82	December 23, 2007	Mississauga, Ontario, Canada	Kidney failure
Joe Dolan	68	December 26, 2007	Dublin, Ireland	Intracerebral hemorrhage

== 2008 ==
Name	Age	Date	Location	Cause of death
Keith Baxter; 3 Colours Red	36	January 4, 2008	Lancaster, Lancashire, England	Liver failure
Mort Garson	83	January 4, 2008	San Francisco, California, U.S.	Kidney failure
Irene Reid	77	January 5, 2008	The Bronx, New York, U.S.	Cardiac arrest
Ken Nelson; Record producer and manager from Capitol Records	96	January 6, 2008	Somis, California, U.S.	
Clyde Otis	83	January 8, 2008	Englewood, New Jersey, U.S.	Natural causes
Dave Day; The Monks	66	January 10, 2008	Renton, Washington, U.S.	Heart attack
Rod Allen; Lead singer for The Fortunes	63	January 10, 2008	Eastern Green, Coventry, England	Liver cancer
Freddy Nieuland; Wallace Collection	63	January 10, 2008	Brussels, Belgium	Cancer
Pete Candoli	84	January 11, 2008	Studio City, California, U.S.	Prostate cancer
Betty McGlown; The Supremes	66	January 12, 2008	Royal Oak, Michigan, U.S.	Diabetes
Carlos	64	January 17, 2008	Clichy, Hauts-de-Seine, France	Liver cancer
John Stewart; The Kingston Trio	68	January 19, 2008	San Diego, California, U.S.	Stroke
Trevor Taylor; Bad Boys Blue	50	January 19, 2008	Cologne, Germany	Heart attack
Tommy McQuater	93	January 20, 2008	London, England	No cause given
Francis Clay	84	January 21, 2008	San Francisco, California, U.S.	Natural causes
Ben McMillan; Lead singer for Gruntruck	46	January 26, 2008	Seattle, Washington	Complications from Diabetes
Jeff Salen; Tuff Darts	55	January 26, 2008	New York City, U.S.	Heart attack
Sean Finnegan; Void	43	January 30, 2008	Baltimore, Maryland, U.S.	Apparent heart attack
Vance Walker; Patty & the Emblems	63	February 1, 2008	Mount Laurel, New Jersey, U.S.	Unknown causes
Jackie Orszaczky	59	February 3, 2008	Sydney, Australia	Hodgkin's lymphoma
Chris Anderson	81	February 4, 2008	Manhattan, New York, U.S.	Complications from a stroke
Scot Halpin; The Who	54	February 9, 2008	Bloomington, Indiana, U.S.	Brain tumor
Vincent Thomas; Ohio Players	50	February 16, 2008	Lubbock, Texas, U.S.	Cancer
Bobby Lord	74	February 16, 2008	Stuart, Florida, U.S.	Died after a long illness
Yegor Letov; Grazhdanskaya Oborona	43	February 19, 2008	Omsk, Russia	Heart failure
Teo Macero	82	February 19, 2008	Riverhead, New York, United States	Died in sleep
Nunzio Gallo Italian singer and actor	79	February 22, 2008	Telese Ferme, Italy	
Static Major; Playa	33	February 25, 2008	Louisville, Kentucky, U.S.	Complications from a medical procedure
Buddy Miles	60	February 26, 2008	Austin, Texas, U.S.	Congestive heart disease
Mike Smith; The Dave Clark Five	64	February 28, 2008	Aylesbury, Buckinghamshire, England	Pneumonia
Mike Conley; M.I.A.	49	February 28, 2008	Chicago, Illinois, U.S.	Head injuries from fall
Jeff Healey; The Jeff Healey Band	41	March 2, 2008	Toronto, Ontario, Canada	Sarcoma
Norman Smith; Record producer and audio engineer	85	March 3, 2008	East Sussex, England	
Giuseppe Di Stefano Italian tenor, one of the most popular and beloved opera singers of the post-war period	86	March 3, 2008	Santa Maria Hoè, Lecco, Italy	
Vytautas Kernagis; Lithuanian singer and songwriter and a member of Dainos Teatras	56	March 15, 2008	Vilnius, Lithuania	Gastric cancer
Mikey Dread	53	March 15, 2008	Stamford, Connecticut, U.S.	Brain tumor
Ola Brunkert; Drummer for ABBA	61	March 16, 2008	Mallorca, Spain	Accidentally cut his neck after hitting a glass door at home
Daniel MacMaster; Bonham	39	March 16, 2008	Thunder Bay, Canada	Staph infection
Ninni Maina Italian jazz singer	76	March 17, 2008	Foggia, Italy	
John Fowler Steelheart, Rage of Angels	41	March 21, 2008	Stamford, Connecticut, US	Brain aneurysm
Klaus Dinger; Kraftwerk, Neu!, La! Neu?	61	March 21, 2008	Düsseldorf, Germany	Heart failure
Chalmers Alford	52	March 24, 2008	Huntsville, Alabama, U.S.	Diabetes
Sean Levert; LeVert	39	March 30, 2008	Cleveland, Ohio, U.S.	Heart disease/Diabetes
Lawrence Brown; Harold Melvin & The Blue Notes	63	April 6, 2008	Philadelphia, Pennsylvania, United States	Respiratory condition
George Butler; Record producer	76	April 9, 2008	Castro Valley, California, U.S.	Alzheimer's disease
Ozzie Cadena; Record producer for Savoy Records	83	April 9, 2008	Torrance, California, U.S.	Pneumonia and complications from a stroke
Marisa Sannia Italian singer-songwriter and actress	61	April 14, 2008	Cagliari, Italy	
Sean Costello	28	April 15, 2008	Atlanta, Georgia, U.S.	Drug overdose
Cliff Davies; If, Ted Nugent	59	April 15, 2008	Atlanta, Georgia, U.S.	Suicide
Brian Davison; The Nice	65	April 15, 2008	Bideford, Devon, England	Brain tumor
Danny Federici; Bruce Springsteen and the E-Street Band	58	April 17, 2008	New York City, New York, U.S.	Melanoma
José Barragán Flactorophia	25	April 19, 2008	Quito, Ecuador	Fire injuries (Quito Ultratumba nightclub fire)
Orish Grinstead; Original member of 702	27	April 20, 2008	Las Vegas, Nevada, United States	Kidney failure
VL Mike	32	April 20, 2008	New Orleans, Louisiana, U.S.	Shot to death
Al Wilson	68	April 21, 2008	Fontana, California, U.S.	Kidney failure
Bob Childers	61	April 22, 2008	Stillwater, Oklahoma, U.S.	Pneumonia and chronic obstructive pulmonary disease
Paul Davis	60	April 22, 2008	Meridian, Mississippi, U.S.	Heart attack
Micky Waller; The Steampacket, The Jeff Beck Group	66	April 29, 2008	London, England	Liver failure
Ernesto Bonino Italian singer	86	April 29, 2008	Milan, Italy	
Eddy Arnold	89	May 8, 2008	Nashville, Tennessee, U.S.	Natural causes
John Rutsey; Rush	55	May 11, 2008	Toronto, Ontario, Canada	Heart attack as a result of diabetes
Michelle Meldrum; Phantom Blue, Meldrum	39	May 21, 2008	Burbank, California, U.S.	Brain cyst/Coma
Jimmy McGriff	72	May 24, 2008	Voorhees Township, New Jersey, U.S.	Multiple sclerosis
Jerry Cole	68	May 28, 2008	Corona, California, U.S.	Heart attack
Hugh Jarrett; The Jordanaires	78	May 31, 2008	Atlanta, Georgia, United States	Injuries from a car crash
Al Jones	62	June 1, 2008	England	No cause given
Bo Diddley	79	June 2, 2008	Archer, Florida, U.S.	Heart failure
Carlo Pierangeli Italian singer and actor	80	June 20, 2008	Turin, Italy	
Lula Reed	82	June 21, 2008	Detroit, Michigan, U.S.	Natural causes
Ira Tucker; The Dixie Hummingbirds	83	June 24, 2008	Philadelphia, Pennsylvania, U.S.	Cardiovascular disease
Mel Galley; Whitesnake, Trapeze, Phenomena	60	July 1, 2008	Heath Hayes and Wimblebury, Staffordshire, England	Esophageal cancer
Jimmy Schou; Tickle Me Pink	22	July 1, 2008	Fort Collins, Colorado, U.S.	Heroin overdose
Natasha Shneider; Eleven, Queens of the Stone Age	52	July 2, 2008	Los Angeles, California, U.S.	Cancer
Paul Varley; The Arrows (drummer)	59	July 2, 2008	Preston, Lancashire, England, United Kingdom	Pneumonia
Colin Cooper; Singer/Saxophone for "Climax Blues Band"	68	July 3, 2008	Stafford, England	Cancer
Oscar McLollie; The Bullets	83	July 4, 2008	Oakland, California, U.S.	Natural causes
Les Crane	74	July 13, 2008	Greenbrae, California, U.S.	Natural causes
Katie Reider	30	July 14, 2008	New York City, New York, U.S.	Jaw tumor/Cerebral hemorrhage
Jo Stafford	90	July 16, 2008	Century City, California, U.S.	Congestive heart failure
Artie Traum	65	July 20, 2008	Bearsville, New York, U.S.	Cancer
Joe Beck	62	July 22, 2008	Woodbury, Connecticut, U.S.	Lung cancer
Hiram Bullock	52	July 25, 2008	Manhattan, New York, U.S.	Cancer
Johnny Griffin	80	July 25, 2008	Paris, France	Heart attack
Erik Darling; The Rooftop Singers	74	August 3, 2008	Chapel Hill, North Carolina, U.S.	Lymphatic cancer
Robert Hazard	59	August 5, 2008	Boston, Massachusetts, U.S.	Pancreatic cancer
Isaac Hayes	65	August 10, 2008	Memphis, Tennessee, U.S.	Complications due to stroke
Don Helms; Drifting Cowboys	81	August 11, 2008	Nashville, Tennessee, U.S.	Diabetes (after heart surgery)
Christie Allen	54	August 12, 2008	Bunbury, Western Australia, Australia	Pancreatic cancer
Jerry Wexler; Music journalist and record producer	91	August 15, 2008	Sarasota, Florida, U.S.	Congestive heart failure
Jimmy Moore; The Five Royales	82	August 16, 2008	Ossining, New York, U.S.	Died after a long illness
Pervis Jackson; The Spinners	70	August 18, 2008	Detroit, Michigan, U.S.	Brain and liver cancer
LeRoi Moore; The Dave Matthews Band	46	August 19, 2008	Los Angeles, California, U.S.	Complications after an ATV accident
Little Arthur Duncan	74	August 20, 2008	Northlake, Illinois, U.S.	Complications after brain surgery
Jerry Finn; Record producer	39	August 21, 2008	Los Angeles, California, U.S.	Cerebral hemorrhage
Egidijus Remeikis; Member of Tipo Grupė	26	August 23, 2008	Vilijampolė, Kaunas, Lithuania	Car accident
Jevgenijus Snytkinas; Member of Tipo Grupė	27	August 23, 2008	Vilijampolė, Kaunas, Lithuania	Car accident
Jerry Reed	71	September 1, 2008	Nashville, Tennessee, U.S.	Emphysema
Dino Dvornik	44	September 7, 2008	Zagreb, Croatia	Suicide
Richard "Popcorn" Wylie	69	September 7, 2008	Detroit, Michigan, U.S.	Congestive heart problems
Richard Wright; Pink Floyd	65	September 15, 2008	London, England	Lung cancer
Norman Whitfield; Record producer for The Temptations and co-founder of Motown and Whitfield Records	68	September 16, 2008	Los Angeles, California, U.S.	Diabetes
Giorgio Bettinelli Italian singer-songwriter	53	September 16, 2008	Jinghong, Xishuangbanna Autonomous Prefecture, China	Infection/sudden illness
Stefano Rosso (Stefano Rossi) Italian singer- songwriter and guitarist	59	September 16, 2008	Rome, Italy	Incurable disease
Opal Courtney Jr. The Spaniels	71	September 18, 2008	Gary, Indiana, U.S.	Heart attack
Earl Palmer	83	September 19, 2008	Banning, California, U.S.	After a long illness
Nappy Brown	78	September 20, 2008	Charlotte, North Carolina, U.S.	Natural causes
Cherry Smith; The Wailers	65	September 24, 2008	Miami, Florida, U.S.	Heart attack
Nick Reynolds; The Kingston Trio	75	October 1, 2008	San Diego, California, U.S.	Acute respiratory disease
Johnny "J"	39	October 3, 2008	Los Angeles, California, U.S.	Apparent suicide
Gidget Gein; Marilyn Manson	39	October 8, 2008	Burbank, California, U.S.	Heroin overdose
Alton Ellis	70	October 10, 2008	Hammersmith, London, England	Bone cancer
Cliff Nobles	67	October 12, 2008	Norristown, Pennsylvania, U.S.	Unknown
Frankie Kerr; Teenage Head	51	October 15, 2008	Hamilton, Ontario, Canada	Throat cancer
Levi Stubbs; The Four Tops	72	October 17, 2008	Detroit, Michigan, U.S.	Natural causes
Dee Dee Warwick	66	October 18, 2008	Essex County, New Jersey, U.S.	Failing health from drug addiction
Virgil Gonsalves; Pacific Gas & Electric	76	October 20, 2008	Salinas, California, U.S.	Unknown
Peter Gläser; Klaus Renft Combo, Karussell	59	October 23, 2008	Leipzig, Saxony, Germany	Cancer
Merl Saunders; Legion of Mary	74	October 24, 2008	San Francisco, California, United States	Complications following stroke
Mike Baker; Shadow Gallery	45	October 29, 2008	Allentown, Pennsylvania, U.S.	Heart attack
Frank Navetta; Descendents	46	October 31, 2008	Eugene, Oregon, U.S.	Diabetic coma/Died in his sleep
Jimmy Carl Black; The Mothers of Invention, Muffin Men, Captain Beefheart	70	November 1, 2008	Siegsdorf, Germany	Lung cancer
Nathaniel Mayer	64	November 1, 2008	Detroit, Michigan, U.S.	Stroke
Jody Reynolds; The Storms	75	November 7, 2008	Palm Desert, California, U.S.	Liver cancer
Miriam Makeba	76	November 9, 2008	Castel Volturno, Italy	Heart attack on stage
Mitch Mitchell; The Jimi Hendrix Experience	62	November 12, 2008	Portland, Oregon, U.S.	Natural causes
MC Breed	37	November 22, 2008	Ypsilanti, Michigan, U.S.	Complications from kidney failure
Michael Lee	39	November 24, 2008	Darlington, County Durham, England	Epileptic seizure
Munetaka Higuchi; Loudness	49	November 30, 2008	Osaka, Japan	Hepatocellular carcinoma
Odetta	77	December 2, 2008	New York City, New York, U.S.	Heart disease
Chico Banks	46	December 3, 2008	Chicago, Illinois, U.S.	Heart problems
Steve Isham; Autograph	56	December 9, 2008	North Hills, California, U.S.	Liver cancer
Dennis Yost; Classics IV	65	December 7, 2008	Hamilton, Ohio, U.S.	Respiratory failure
Davey Graham	68	December 15, 2008	London, England	Lung cancer
Sandeé; Exposé	46	December 15, 2008	Hollywood, Florida, U.S.	Seizure
Feliciano Vierra Tavares; Tavares	88	December 17, 2008	Hyannis, Massachusetts, U.S.	Prostate cancer
Robert Ward; Ohio Players	70	December 25, 2008	Dry Branch, Georgia, U.S.	After a long illness and strokes
Eartha Kitt American singer-songwriter, actress, and dancer, also known for her performances in cabaret theater	81	December 25, 2008	Weston, Connecticut, U.S.	Colon cancer
Delaney Bramlett; Delaney & Bonnie	69	December 27, 2008	Los Angeles, California, U.S.	Complications after gall bladder surgery
Freddie Hubbard	70	December 29, 2008	Sherman Oaks, California, U.S.	Complications from a heart attack

== 2009 ==
Name	Age	Date	Location	Cause of death
Walter Haynes; American steel guitarist	80	January 1, 2009	Tyler, Texas, U.S.	Unknown
Valentina Giovagnini; Italian pop singer	28	January 2, 2009	Siena, Italy	Car accident
Charles Camilleri; Maltese composer; conductor at the 1972 Eurovision Song Contest	77	January 3, 2009	Malta	Undisclosed
Sam Taylor Jr	74	January 5, 2009	Islandia, New York, U.S.	Heart disease
Ron Asheton; The Stooges	60	January 6, 2009	Ann Arbor, Michigan, U.S.	Heart attack
Claude Jeter; Swan Silvertones, The Dixie Hummingbirds	94	January 6, 2009	The Bronx, New York City, New York, U.S.	Unknown
Maria Dimitriadi; Greek singer	58	January 6, 2009	Athens, Greece	Lung disease
Alex van Heerden; South African jazz musician	34	January 7, 2009	Cape Town, South Africa	Car accident
Lamya; Duran Duran, Soul II Soul	45	January 8, 2009	Oman	Heart attack
Dave Dee; Dave Dee, Dozy, Beaky, Mick & Tich	67	January 9, 2009	Kingston upon Thames, Surrey, England	Prostate cancer
Jon Hager; Hager Twins	67	January 9, 2009	Nashville, Tennessee, U.S.	Died in his sleep
Anabel Bosch; Filipina singer and poet	32	January 10, 2009	Manila, Philippines	Complications from a brain aneurysm
Andy DeMize; Nekromantix	25	January 11, 2009	Fullerton, California, U.S.	Traffic accident
Alejandro Sokol; Las Pelotas	48	January 12, 2009	Río Cuarto, Córdoba, Argentina	Respiratory insufficiency
Mansour Rahbani; Rahbani brothers	83	January 13, 2009	Beirut, Lebanon	Pneumonia
Angela Morley; British composer and conductor	84	January 14, 2009	Scottsdale, Arizona, U.S.	Complications of a fall and a heart attack
Ricardo Montalbán	88	January 14, 2009	Los Angeles, California, U.S.	Congestive heart failure
The Mighty Duke	76	January 14, 2009	St. Clair (Port-of-Spain), Trinidad and Tobago	Myelofibrosis
Leroy Smith; Sweet Sensation	56	January 15, 2009	Manchester, England	Bronchopneumonia
Jean Adebambo	46	January 15, 2009	London, England	Suspected suicide by barbiturate overdose
Whitey Mitchell; American jazz bassist and television writer/producer; played the bass intro to Ben E. King's "Stand by Me"	76	January 16, 2009	Palm Springs, California, U.S.	Undisclosed
Ron McClelland; StorySide:B	33	January 18, 2009	U.S.	Undiagnosed heart condition
David "Fathead" Newman	75	January 20, 2009	Kingston, New York, U.S.	Complications of pancreatic cancer
Thearon Hill; The Royal Jokers	76	January 20, 2009		Unknown causes
Mickey Gee; Welsh rock and roll guitarist	64	January 21, 2009	Cardiff, Wales	Emphysema
Charles Cooper; Telefon Tel Aviv	31	January 22, 2009	Illinois, Chicago, U.S.	Possible overdose of alcohol and sleeping pills
Corey James Daum; Lizzy Borden	39	January 24, 2009	Nashville, Tennessee, U.S.	Car crash
Gérard Blanc; Martin Circus	61	January 24, 2009	Paris, France	Hemorrhage
Gerry Merito; Howard Morrison Quartet	70	January 26, 2009	Waihau, New Zealand	Undisclosed
Mino Reitano; Italian singer, songwriter, and actor	64	January 27, 2009	Agrate Brianza, Lombardy, Italy	Intestinal cancer
Billy Powell; Lynyrd Skynyrd	56	January 28, 2009	Orange Park, Florida, U.S.	Heart attack
Hank Crawford	74	January 29, 2009	Memphis, Tennessee, U.S.	Stroke
John Martyn	60	January 29, 2009	Thomastown, Ireland	Respiratory failure
Mike Francis; Italian singer and composer	47	January 30, 2009	Rome, Italy	Lung cancer
Dewey Martin; Buffalo Springfield, Sir Walter Raleigh & The Coupons	68	January 31, 2009	Van Nuys, California, U.S.	Natural causes
Cornelius Johnson; Ohio Players	71	February 1, 2009	Dayton, Ohio, U.S.	Undisclosed causes
Sunny Skylar; American Tin Pan Alley composer, lyricist, singer, and music publisher	95	February 2, 2009	Las Vegas, Nevada, U.S.	Natural causes
Tom Brumley; Buck Owens, The Buckaroos, Rick Nelson, The Desert Rose Band, The Strangers	73	February 3, 2009	San Antonio, Texas, U.S.	Heart attack
Kurt Demmler; East German dissident songwriter	65	February 3, 2009	Berlin, Germany	Suicide by hanging (after allegations of sexual abuse)
Steve Dullaghan; The Primitives, Nocturnal Babies	45	February 4, 2009	Cheylesmore, Coventry, England	Natural causes
Lux Interior; The Cramps	62	February 4, 2009	Glendale, California, U.S.	Aortic dissection
Molly Bee	69	February 7, 2009	Oceanside, California, U.S.	Stroke
Blossom Dearie	82	February 7, 2009	New York City, U.S.	Natural causes
Jorge Reyes; Mexican ambient musician; member of the group Chac Mool	56	February 7, 2009	Mexico City, Mexico	Heart attack
Vic Lewis; British jazz guitarist and bandleader	89	February 9, 2009		Undisclosed
Orlando "Cachaíto" López; Buena Vista Social Club	76	February 9, 2009	Havana, Cuba	Complications from pancreatic cancer surgery
Estelle Bennett; The Ronettes	67	February 11, 2009	Englewood, New Jersey, U.S.	Colon cancer
Mat Matthews; Dutch jazz accordionist	84	February 12, 2009	Rotterdam, Netherlands	Undisclosed
Coleman Mellett; Guitarist for Chuck Mangione	34	February 12, 2009	Clarence Center, New York, U.S.	Died in the Colgan Air Flight 3407 airplane crash
Gerry Niewood; Saxophonist and flutist for Chuck Mangione and Dave Samuels	65	February 12, 2009	Clarence Center, New York, U.S.	Died in the Colgan Air Flight 3407 airplane crash
Louie Bellson; Drummer for Count Basie, Jimmy Dorsey, Tommy Dorsey, Duke Ellington, Ella Fitzgerald, Benny Goodman, Harry James	84	February 14, 2009	Los Angeles, California, U.S.	Parkinson's Disease
Buck Griffin; American rockabilly musician	85	February 14, 2009	Sayre, Oklahoma, U.S.	Heart failure/complications due to emphysema
Ciro Sebastianelli; Italian singer-songwriter	58	February 14, 2009	Milan, Italy	Heart problems
Joe Cuba; American conga drummer; "The Father of Latin Boogaloo"	77	February 15, 2009	New York City, New York, U.S.	Bacterial infection
Morris Broadnax	78	February 17, 2009	Wayne, Michigan, U.S.	Congestive heart failure
Snooks Eaglin	72	February 18, 2009	New Orleans, Louisiana, U.S.	Heart attack
Miika Tenkula; Sentenced	34	February 18, 2009	Muhos, Finland	Heart attack/Genetic heart disease
Kelly Groucutt; Electric Light Orchestra	63	February 19, 2009	Worcester, England	Heart attack
Fats Sadi; Belgian jazz musician, vocalist, and composer	81	February 20, 2009	Huy, Belgium	Undisclosed (had been in extended retirement with ill health)
Ian Carr	75	February 25, 2009	London, England	Alzheimer's Disease
Randall Bewley; Pylon	53	February 25, 2009	Athens, Georgia, U.S.	Heart attack
Ernest Ashworth	80	March 2, 2009	Nashville, Tennessee, U.S.	Natural causes after bypass surgery
John Cephas; Cephas & Wiggins	78	March 4, 2009	Woodford, Virginia, U.S.	Natural casuses/Pulmonary fibrosis
Salwa Al Katrib; Lebanese singer and actress	55	March 4, 2009	Lebanon	Cerebral hemorrhage
Francis Magalona; Filipino rapper and actor	44	March 6, 2009	The Medical City, Pasig, Metro Manila, Philippines	Acute myeloid leukemia
David Williams; Guitarist for Chanson, Michael Jackson, Madonna, and others	58	March 6, 2009	Hampton, Virginia, U.S.	Cardiac arrest
Jimmy Boyd	70	March 7, 2009	Santa Monica, California, U.S.	Cancer
Hank Locklin	91	March 8, 2009	Brewton, Alabama, U.S.	Natural causes/Unknown
Willie King; American blues musician	65	March 8, 2009	Old Memphis, Alabama, U.S.	Heart attack
Alain Bashung; French singer, composer, and actor	61	March 14, 2009	Paris, France	Lung cancer
Edmund Hockridge; Canadian baritone and actor	89	March 15, 2009	Peterborough, Cambridgeshire, England	Undisclosed (likely natural causes)
Carolyn DeZurik; The DeZurik Sisters	90	March 16, 2009	Renton, Washington, U.S.	Undisclosed
Jack Lawrence; American songwriter	96	March 16, 2009	Redding, Connecticut, U.S.	Complications from a fall
Lester Davenport; American blues musician	77	March 17, 2009	Chicago, Illinois, U.S.	Prostate cancer
Eddie Bo; American R&B singer	78	March 18, 2009	Picayune, Mississippi, U.S.	Heart attack
Kent Henry; Blues Image, Steppenwolf	60	March 18, 2009	Portland, Oregon, U.S.	Alzheimer's disease
Ion Dolănescu; Romanian folk singer and politician	65	March 19, 2009	Bucharest, Romania	Heart attack
Mel Brown	69	March 20, 2009	Kitchener, Ontario, Canada	Complications from emphysema
Vladimir Savčić (a.k.a. Čobi); Serbian singer	60	March 20, 2009	Belgrade, Serbia	Colon cancer after struggles with obesity
Reg Isidore; Aruban drummer; worked with Robin Trower	59	March 22, 2009	Unknown	Heart attack
Aubrey Mayhew; American music producer	81	March 22, 2009	Undisclosed	Undisclosed health issues
Uriel Jones; The Funk Brothers	74	March 24, 2009	Dearborn, Michigan, U.S.	Heart attack
Dan Seals; England Dan and John Ford Coley	61	March 25, 2009	Nashville, Tennessee, U.S.	Mantle cell lymphoma
Manny Oquendo; American percussionist; worked with Tito Puente and Tito Rodríguez	78	March 25, 2009	New York City, New York, U.S.	Heart attack
Arne Bendiksen; Norwegian singer, composer, and producer; multi-time Eurovision representative	82	March 26, 2009	Bergen, Norway	Heart failure
John Mayhew; Drummer for Genesis	61	March 26, 2009	Glasgow, Scotland	Heart condition
Bazgul Badakhshi; Afghan folk singer, musician, and folklorist	106 or 107	March 29, 2009	Chenarganjishkan Village, Badakhshan, Afghanistan	Undisclosed (likely natural causes)
Monte Hale	89	March 29, 2009	Studio City, California, U.S.	After a long illness
Duane Jarvis	51	April 1, 2009	Marina del Rey, California, U.S.	Colon cancer
Bud Shank	82	April 2, 2009	Tucson, Arizona, U.S.	Pulmonary embolism
Charlie Kennedy; American big band-era alto saxophonist	81	April 3, 2009	Ventura, California, U.S.	Pulmonary disease
Tony D American hip-hop DJ and musician	42	April 4, 2009	Hamilton Township, Mercer County, New Jersey, U.S.	Car accident
Nancy Overton; The Chordettes	83	April 5, 2009	Blairstown, New Jersey, U.S.	Esophageal cancer
A-Sun; Taiwanese singer	34	April 6, 2009	Xindian, Taipei County, Taiwan	Breast cancer
Tam Paton; Bay City Rollers	70	April 8, 2009	Edinburgh, Scotland	Heart attack
Randy Cain; The Delfonics	63	April 9, 2009	Maple Shade Township, New Jersey, U.S.	Undisclosed causes
Rocky Hill; Dusty Hill's oldest brother and association of American Blues	62	April 10, 2009	Houston, Texas, U.S.	Undisclosed illness
Zeke Zarchy	93	April 11, 2009	Irvine, California, U.S.	Pneumonia
Ron Stallings; Huey Lewis and the News	62	April 13, 2009	Berkeley, California, U.S.	Multiple myeloma
Gregg Fulkerson; Blue Tears	44	April 14, 2009	Franklin, Williamson, Tennessee, U.S.	Undisclosed
Robert Brookins; Earth, Wind & Fire, George Duke, Stanley Clarke, Jeffrey Osborne, The Whispers, Wayman Tisdale, etc...	46	April 15, 2009	Elk Grove, Sacramento, California, U.S.	Heart attack
Betty Hall Jones	98	April 20, 2009	Torrance, California, U.S.	Natural causes
Enzo Malepasso (Vincenzo) Italian singer, composer and record producer active in the early 1980s	54	April 27, 2009	Siziano, Pavia, Italy	Serious illness
Vern Gosdin	74	April 28, 2009	Nashville, Tennessee, U.S.	Stroke
Ean Evans; Lynyrd Skynyrd, Outlaws	48	May 6, 2009	Columbus, Mississippi, U.S.	Lung cancer
Maxine King; The King Sisters	97	May 13, 2009	Corona, California, U.S.	Unknown
Dolla	21	May 18, 2009	Los Angeles, California, U.S.	Murdered
Uli Trepte; Guru Guru	68	May 21, 2009	Berlin, Germany	Cancer
Jay Bennett; Wilco	45	May 24, 2009	Urbana, Illinois, U.S.	Accidental overdose
Koko Taylor	80	June 3, 2009	Kildeer, Illinois, U.S.	Complications from gastrointestinal bleeding
Hugh Hopper; Soft Machine	64	June 7, 2009	Whitstable, Kent, England	Leukemia
Barry Beckett	66	June 10, 2009	Hendersonville, Tennessee, U.S.	Stroke
Bob Bogle; The Ventures	75	June 14, 2009	Vancouver, Washington, U.S.	Non-Hodgkin lymphoma
José Calvário; Portuguese songwriter and conductor; four-time Eurovision participant	58	June 17, 2009	Oeiras Municipality, Portugal	Heart attack
Sky Saxon; The Seeds	71	June 25, 2009	Austin, Texas, U.S.	Heart and kidney failure
Michael Jackson; The Jackson 5	50	June 25, 2009	Los Angeles, California, U.S.	Cardiac arrest from propofol overdose.
Fayette Pinkney; The Three Degrees	61	June 27, 2009	Lansdale, Pennsylvania, U.S.	Respiratory failure
Allen Klein; Record label executive and co-founder of ABKCO Records	77	July 4, 2009	New York City, New York, U.S.	Respiratory failure
Drake Levin; Paul Revere & the Raiders	62	July 4, 2009	San Francisco, California, U.S.	Cancer
George William Fullerton	86	July 4, 2009	Fullerton, California, U.S.	
Midnight; Crimson Glory	47	July 8, 2009	St. Petersburg, Florida, U.S.	Stomach aneurysm
Gordon Waller; Peter and Gordon	64	July 17, 2009	Norfolk, Connecticut, U.S.	Cardiac arrest
John Dawson; New Riders of the Purple Sage	64	July 21, 2009	San Miguel de Allende, Mexico	Stomach cancer
Andrew Freddie Thomas; Bad Boys Blue	63	July 21, 2009	Cologne, Germany	Pancreatic cancer
Marcel Jacob; Talisman	45	July 21, 2009	Kristineberg, Stockholm, Sweden	Suicide
Danny McBride; Sha Na Na	63	July 23, 2009	Los Angeles, California, U.S.	Cardiovascular disease
George Russell	86	July 27, 2009	Boston, Massachusetts, U.S.	Complications from Alzheimer’s
Andy Parle; Space	42	August 1, 2009	Liverpool, England	Fell crossing the road
Mbah Surip	52	August 4, 2009	Jakarta, Indonesia	Heart attack
Willy DeVille; Mink DeVille	58	August 6, 2009	New York City, New York, U.S.	Pancreatic cancer
Mike Seeger	75	August 7, 2009	Lexington, Virginia, U.S.	Cancer
David Van De Pitte; Record producer, arranger and co-founder of Motown Records	67	August 9, 2009	Southfield, Michigan, U.S.	Cancer
Rashied Ali	76	August 12, 2009	Manhattan, New York City, New York, U.S.	Heart attack
Allen Shellenberger; Lit	39	August 13, 2009	Artesia, California, U.S.	Brain cancer
Les Paul	94	August 13, 2009	White Plains, New York, U.S.	Pneumonia
Larry Knechtel; Bread	69	August 20, 2009	Yakima, Washington, U.S.	Heart attack
Johnny Carter; The Flamingos, The Dells	75	August 21, 2009	Harvey, Illinois, U.S.	Lung cancer
Ellie Greenwich	68	August 26, 2009	New York City, New York, U.S.	Heart attack
Virgilio Savona Italian singer and composer	89	August 27, 2009	Milan, Italy	Complications from Parkinson's disease
DJ AM; Crazy Town	36	August 28, 2009	New York City, New York, U.S.	Drug overdose
Marie Knight	89	August 30, 2009	Harlem, New York City, U.S.	Complications from pneumonia
Jake Drake-Brockman; Echo & the Bunnymen	53	September 1, 2009	Isle of Man	Traffic accident
Guy Babylon	52	September 2, 2009	Los Angeles, California, U.S.	Heart attack
Bruce H. Grant; Chris McGregor's Brotherhood Of Breath	59	September 6, 2009	Martinique, Fort-de-France, France	
Kyle Woodring; Survivor, John Mellencamp, Deana Carter, Dennis DeYoung	42	September 8, 2009	Lockport, Illinois, United States	Suicide by hanging
Piero Fiermonte Singer, member of the vocal group Poker di Voci	88	September 9, 2009	Rome, Italy	
Jim Carroll	60	September 11, 2009	Manhattan, New York City, New York, U.S.	Heart attack
Lily Tembo	27	September 14, 2009	Lusaka, Zambia	Gastritis
Mary Travers; Peter, Paul And Mary	72	September 16, 2009	Danbury, Connecticut, U.S.	Complications arising from bone marrow transplant
Roc Raida; The X-Ecutioners	37	September 19, 2009	New York City, New York, U.S.	Cardiac arrest
John "Bootsie" Wilson; The Silhouettes	69	September 21, 2009	Spartanburg, South Carolina, U.S.	Unknown
Sam Carr; The Jelly Roll Kings	83	September 21, 2009	Clarksdale, Mississippi, U.S.	Congestive heart failure
Wesley Johnson (Wess)	64	September 21, 2009	Winston-Salem, North Carolina, U.S.	Severe asthma attack/breathing crisis
Greg Ladanyi; Record producer	57	September 29, 2009	Nicosia, Cyprus	Fractured skull after fall
Mercedes Sosa	74	October 4, 2009	Buenos Aires, Argentina	Multiple organ dysfunction syndrome
Mike Alexander; Evile	32	October 5, 2009	Luleå, Sweden	Pulmonary embolism
Steve Ferguson; NRBQ	60	October 7, 2009	Louisville, Kentucky, U.S.	
Stephen Gately; Boyzone	33	October 10, 2009	Mallorca, Spain	Congenital heart defect
Dickie Peterson; Blue Cheer	61	October 12, 2009	Erkelenz, Germany	Liver cancer
Brendan Mullen; Music promoter, founder of Los Angeles punk rock club The Masque	60	October 12, 2009	Los Angeles, California, U.S.	Stroke
Sandra Rogers; Puerto Rican representative at the 1988 OTI Festival	42	October 12, 2009	Unknown (likely Puerto Rico)	Cancer
Al Martino	82	October 13, 2009	Springfield, Pennsylvania, U.S.	Heart attack
Gidiuli Italian singer	65	October 17, 2009	Modena, Italy	
Alberto Testa Italian lyricist, television writer, singer, composer and record producer	82	October 19, 2009	Velletri, Rome, Italy	Long-term lung disease
Sirone	69	October 21, 2009	Berlin, Germany	
Luther Dixon; The Platters, The Shirelles, The Four Buddies	78	October 22, 2009	Jacksonville, Florida, U.S.	
Chris Bartley	62	October 26, 2009	Secaucus, New Jersey, U.S.	Kidney failure
Taylor Mitchell	19	October 28, 2009	Halifax, Nova Scotia, Canada	Coyote attack
Norton Buffalo; The Steve Miller Band	58	October 30, 2009	Paradise, California, U.S.	Lung cancer
Chen Lin	39	October 31, 2009	Beijing, China	Suicide (Jumped from building)
Jerry Fuchs !!!, Maserati	34	November 8, 2009	Brooklyn, New York, U.S.	Fall after elevator accident
Haydain Neale; Jacksoul	39	November 22, 2009	Toronto, Ontario, Canada	Lung cancer
Al Alberts; The Four Aces	87	November 27, 2009	Arcadia, Florida, U.S.	Renal failure
Bob Keane	87	November 28, 2009	Los Angeles, California, U.S.	Kidney failure
Eric Woolfson; The Alan Parsons Project	64	December 2, 2009	London, England	Kidney cancer
Liam Clancy; Makem and Clancy, The Clancy Brothers	74	December 4, 2009	Cork, Ireland	Pulmonary fibrosis
Jack Rose; Pelt	38	December 5, 2009	Bala Cynwyd, Pennsylvania, U.S.	Heart attack
Nathan Slade; Atomship	36	December 5, 2009	Ocean Springs, Mississippi, U.S.	Prescription drug overdose
Yvonne King; The King Sisters	89	December 13, 2009	Santa Barbara, California, U.S.	Complications after a fall
James Gurley; Big Brother and the Holding Company	69	December 20, 2009	Palm Desert, California, U.S.	Heart attack
Britanny Murphy	32	December 20, 2009	Los Angeles, California, U.S.	Pneumonia/Cardiac arrest
Mick Cocks; Rose Tattoo	54	December 22, 2009	Sydney, Australia	Liver cancer
Arnold S. Caplin; Record producer, co-founder and owner of Historical Records and Biograph Records	80	December 25, 2009	Pittsfield, Massachusetts, U.S.	
Vic Chesnutt	45	December 25, 2009	Athens, Georgia, U.S.	Suicide by drug overdose
Tony Bellamy; Redbone	63	December 25, 2009	Las Vegas, Nevada, U.S.	Liver failure
The Rev; Avenged Sevenfold, Pinkly Smooth, Suburban Legends	28	December 28, 2009	Huntington Beach, California, U.S.	Drug overdose
Rowland S. Howard; The Birthday Party	50	December 30, 2009	Heidelberg, Victoria, Australia	Hepatocellular carcinoma
Earl Gaines	74	December 31, 2009	Nashville, Tennessee, U.S.	
Charly Weiss Drummer for Kraftwerk and Amon Düül	70	December 31, 2009	Düsseldorf, North Rhine-Westphalia, Germany	

== See also ==
- List of 1950s deaths in popular music
- List of 1960s deaths in popular music
- List of 1970s deaths in popular music
- List of 1980s deaths in popular music
- List of 1990s deaths in popular music
- List of 2010s deaths in popular music
- List of 2020s deaths in popular music
