= Melodeon Records =

Melodeon Records is a record label set up in 1964 by Richard K. Spottswood.. The label was sold to Biograph Records in 1970.

Spottswood established Melodeon to release carefully curated releases of rare 78's and field recordings making them more widely available.

Melodeon Records issued - among others - the first recordings after his 'rediscovery' of Skip James and the 1940 Library Of Congress Sessions of Blind Willie McTell. In 1970 the label was acquired by Arnold S. Caplin's Biograph Records.

== See also ==
- List of record labels
