= Biograph Records =

- Parent company: Shout! Factory
- Founded: 1967; 59 years ago
- Founder: Arnold S. Caplin
- Genre: Jazz, blues, ragtime
- Country of origin: United States
- Location: Somerville, Massachusetts

Biograph Records is a record label founded in 1967 by Arnold S. Caplin. It specialized in reissuing vintage American ragtime, jazz, and blues music. Its catalog includes titles by Bunny Berigan, Bing Crosby, The California Ramblers, Ruth Etting, Benny Goodman, Earl Hines, George Lewis, Ted Lewis, Jimmy O'Bryant, Jabbo Smith, Jack Teagarden, Ethel Waters, and Clarence Williams. The company's label are Melodeon, Center, Regal and Dawn.

In 1970 Biograph bought from QRS Records the rights to release recordings made from piano rolls. These included works by Scott Joplin and Fats Waller. Biography also purchased the catalogs of Melodeon Records and Dawn Records.

In August 2002, Biograph was acquired by Retropolis Entertainment, which in 2003 was renamed Shout! Factory by owners Richard Foos and Robert Emmer, two of the founders of the label. Between 2007 and 2008, Collectables Records reissued forty compact discs' worth of Biograph recordings.

== See also ==
- List of record labels
