= Papa Touwtjie =

- Born: John Eduard Touwslager; December 21, 1968; Paramaribo, Suriname
- Died: June 9, 2005 (aged 36) Paramaribo, Suriname
- Genres: Reggae, dancehall
- Occupations: Singer, rapper
- Instrument: Vocals
- Years active: 1991–2005

John Eduard Touwslager (December 21, 1968 – June 9, 2005), better known as Papa Touwtjie, was a Surinamese reggae artist and rapper. He is considered one of the most influential reggae artists in Suriname.

After his release from prison at the beginning of the 1990s, he began a music career and recorded his first album Gangster. He was the first dancehall rapper in the Sranan language. His music was mainly listened by the youth from the poor neighborhoods.

In 1992, Papa Touwtjie had six hits on the Surinamese radio, including the track Mi no wan go na Santo Boma. In 1997, on the fortieth anniversary of the Surinamese newspaper De Ware Tijd, he was awarded the trotyi grani, an award for a trendsetter.

His rude lyrics about street life were not appreciated by everyone. Even parliamentary questions were made. As a result of a family dispute, he was shot by his brother and died of his wounds in June 2005.
