= Jackie Neal =

American blues singer-songwriter (1967–2005)

- Born: Jacqueline Neal; July 7, 1967; Baton Rouge, Louisiana, U.S.
- Died: March 10, 2005 (aged 37); Baton Rouge, Louisiana
- Cause of death: Murdered by gunshot
- Occupations: Singer, songwriter
- Musical career
- Genres: Blues
- Instruments: Vocals

Jacqueline Neal (July 7, 1967 – March 10, 2005) was an American blues singer and songwriter.

== Career ==
Born in Baton Rouge, Louisiana, her parents were Shirley and Raful Neal. Her father was a blues musician too, as were eight of her ten siblings, including Kenny Neal. She was best known for her hit singles "Right Thang, Wrong Man", "The Way We Roll" featuring her son Bro Bro, and "Down in the Club".

== Death ==
Neal was shot and killed by her ex-boyfriend, James White, on March 10, 2005, in Baton Rouge. She was 37.

== Discography ==
=== Albums ===
- Blues Won't Let You Go (1995)
- Lookin' for a Sweet Thang (2000)
- Money Can't Buy Me Love (2002)
- Down in da Club (2005)
