= Arnold S. Caplin =

American record producer (1929–2009)

Arnold S. Caplin (May 8, 1929 in Brooklyn, New York City – December 25, 2009 in Pittsfield, Massachusetts) was an American record producer, founder and (former) owner of Historical Records and Biograph Records. In 1970 he additionally acquired Melodeon Records from Richard K. Spottswood.

== See also ==
- Thomasina Winslow
