= Historical Records =

American independent record label

Historical Records was an American independent record label, set up in 1965 by Arnold S. Caplin.

Historical Records re-issued rare blues, gospel, jazz and country recordings of the 1920s. It played an important role in the 1960s folk and blues revival by making scarce pre-war 78 rpm recordings available on LP.

The label issued thematic compilations that gathered rare sides by major and lesser-known pre-war artists, often with informative notes by Caplin himself. The label tended to produce thematic groupings of rare 78s rather than concentrating on single-artist compilations.

== See also ==
- List of record labels
