= Raful Neal =

American blues singer-songwriter (1936–2004)

Raful Neal (June 6, 1936 – September 1, 2004) was an American Louisiana blues singer, harmonicist and songwriter from the United States.

Neal was born in Baton Rouge, Louisiana, and reared by his aunt and uncle on a tenant farm in Chamberlin, West Baton Rouge Parish. He began playing the harmonica at age 14. He played with Buddy Guy in a band called the Clouds. His first record, "Sunny Side of Love" (1958) on Peacock Records, was not successful.

Neal's first album, called Louisiana Legend, was initially issued by King Snake Records and later by Alligator Records in 1990. His 1991 album I Been Mistreated was released on Ichiban Records. Neal toured globally. In 1997, his harmonica playing was featured on the album Live: Swampland Jam by Tab Benoit. Neal's album Old Friends was issued in 1998.

Neal died of cancer in Baton Rouge in September 2004. Nine of his ten children are also blues musicians, and several performed with him on his later releases on the Alligator label.

== See also ==
- Jackie Neal, a daughter
- Kenny Neal, a son
