= Muddy Kill =

Muddy Kill Modder Kill
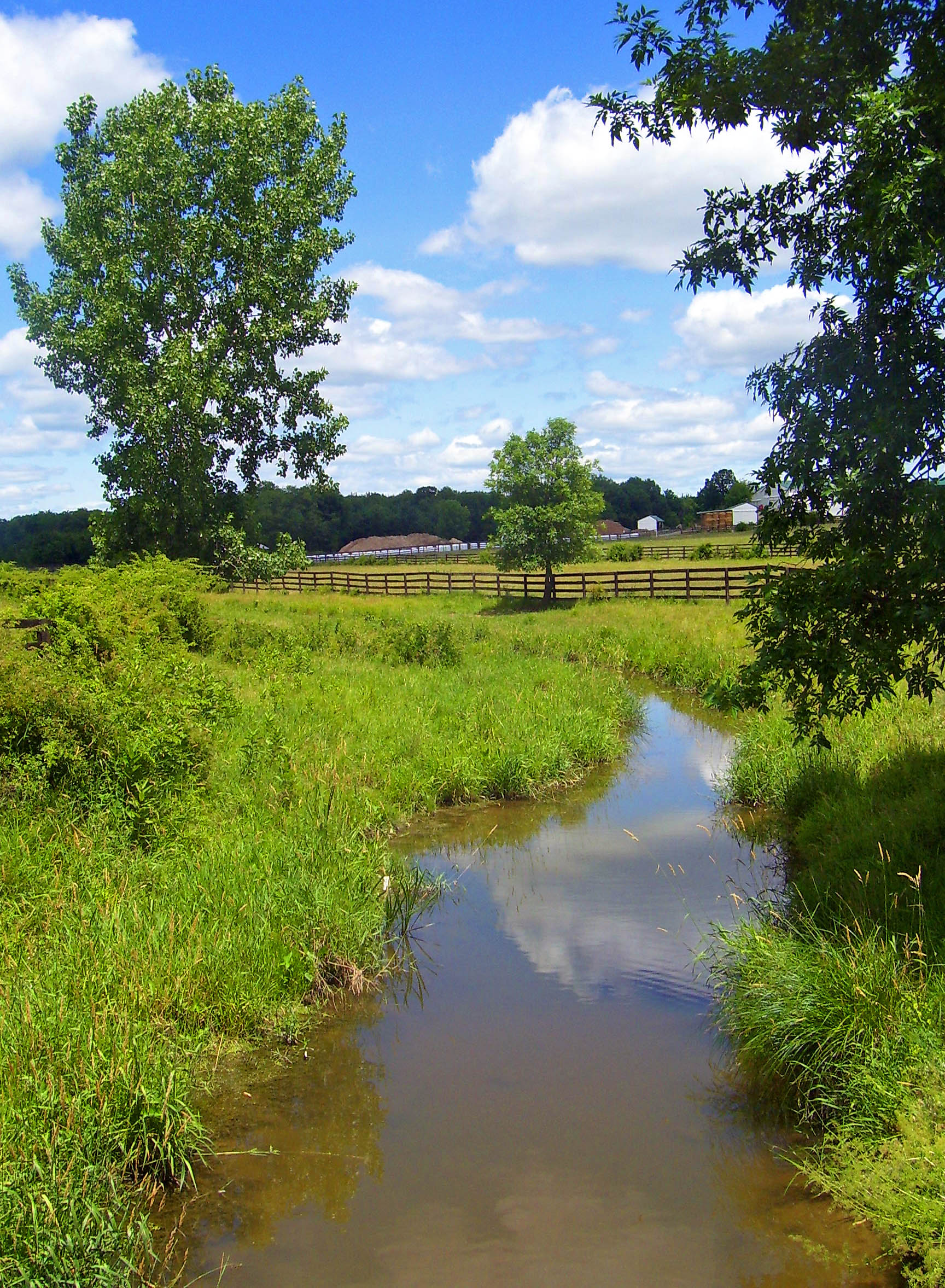
- Muddy Kill flowing through a horse farm just north of NY 17K

Location
- Country: United States
- State: New York
- County: Orange
- Town: Montgomery

Physical characteristics
- Source
  - location: Unnamed pond off Albany Post Road
  - coordinates: 41°34′04″N 74°13′31″W
  - elevation: 400 ft (120 m)
- Mouth: Wallkill River
  - coordinates: 41°31′35″N 74°15′22″W
  - elevation: 340 ft (100 m)

Muddy Kill is a 4.2-mile-long (6.8 km) tributary of the Wallkill River that runs entirely through the town of Montgomery in Orange County, New York, United States. It rises from a small pond just over a mile (1.7 km) west of the village of Walden, flowing first southwesterly then roughly due south to empty into the Wallkill just upstream from the village of Montgomery.

Its course takes it mostly through areas cleared for agriculture, although not all are presently cultivated. Near its mouth it passes through a large horse farm, and then once it runs through a culvert under NY 17K it is within 102 acres (41 ha) recently acquired and developed by the town as Benedict Farm Park. It drains the low-lying Comfort Hills to the west.

The name is an English interpretation of Modder Kill, as it was called by early Dutch settlers in the region. In Dutch, Modder means "mud" or "slime", so the meaning of the creek's name stayed the same. The fertile lands of the creek's valley attracted many early settlers, and the houses of some, such as Abraham Dickerson, Jacob Bookstaver, Moses Mould and Wilhelm Schmitt, still stand. It has been equally attractive to contemporary real estate developers, and to lessen environmental impacts on the stream and the Wallkill watershed as a whole the Open Space Institute and the town cooperated in 2005 to obtain a permanent agricultural easement on the 227-acre (92 ha) Zylstra Farm, one of the largest properties along the creek.

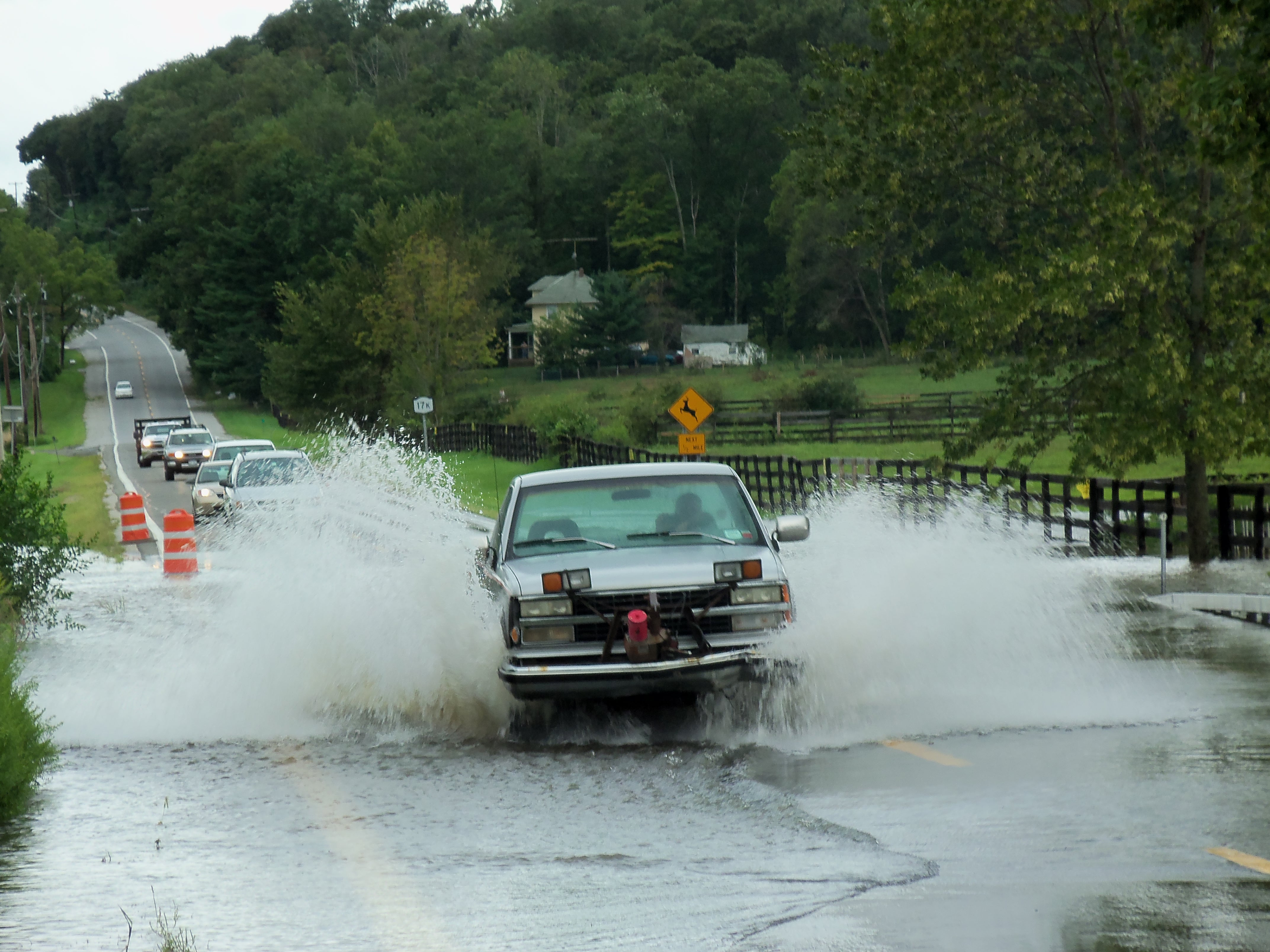
Route 17K flooded at Muddy Kill following Hurricane Irene

With little significant woodland in its valley, the creek can rise quickly when heavy rains fall. After the April 2007 Nor'easter, it flooded severely enough near its mouth that Route 17K had to be closed west of Montgomery for two days.

== See also ==
- List of rivers of New York
