= College Park, Georgia =

City in Georgia, United States

College Park
- City
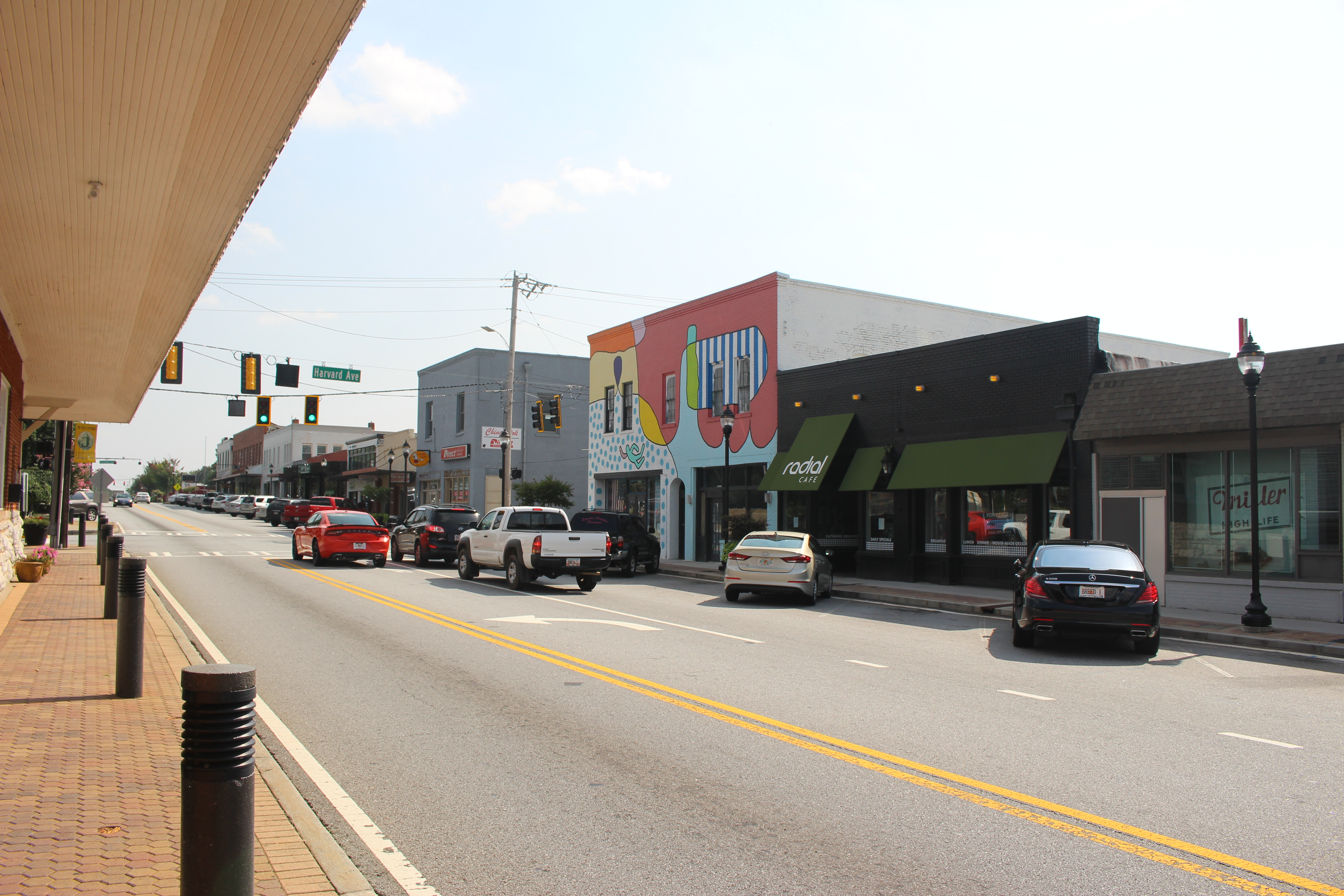
- Downtown College Park

- Flag Seal

- Location in Fulton County and the state of Georgia

- Location of College Park in Metro Atlanta
- Coordinates: 33°37′03″N 84°28′03″W
- Country: United States
- State: Georgia
- Counties: Fulton, Clayton

Government
  - Type: Mayor-council government
  - Mayor: Bianca Motley Broom

Area
  - Total: 11.21 sq mi (29.03 km^{2})
  - Land: 11.16 sq mi (28.91 km^{2})
  - Water: 0.046 sq mi (0.12 km^{2})
- Elevation: 1,037 ft (316 m)

Population (2020)
  - Total: 13,930
  - Density: 1,248.1/sq mi (481.91/km^{2})
- Time zone: UTC-5 (Eastern (EST))
  - Summer (DST): UTC-4 (EDT)
- ZIP codes: 30337, 30349
- Area codes: 404/678/470
- FIPS code: 13-17776
- GNIS feature ID: 2404098
- Website: collegeparkga.gov

College Park is a city in Fulton and Clayton counties, Georgia, United States, adjacent to the southern boundary of the city of Atlanta. As of the 2020 census, the population was 13,930.

Georgia International Convention Center and part of Hartsfield–Jackson Atlanta International Airport are located in the city. The College Park Historic District is Georgia's fourth-largest urban historical district listed on the National Register of Historic Places. The Gateway Center Arena in College Park is the home stadium of the College Park Skyhawks and Atlanta Dream.

== History ==
=== 19th century ===
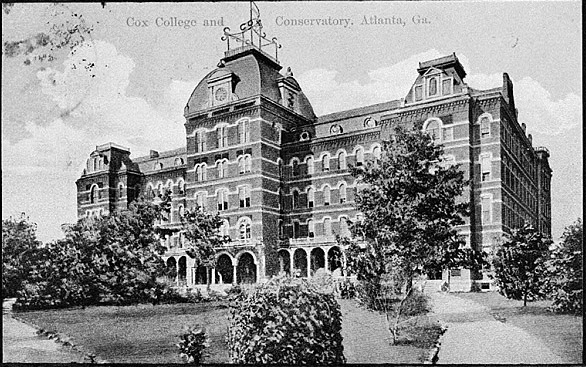
Cox College and Conservatory, 1900

The community that became College Park was founded as Atlantic City in 1890 as a depot on the Atlanta and West Point Railroad. The town was renamed Manchester when it was incorporated as a city in 1891. It was renamed again as the city of College Park in 1896. The city's name came from being the home of Cox College (where the city hall and other buildings now stand) and Georgia Military Academy (now the Woodward Academy). The east–west avenues in College Park are named for Ivy League colleges, and the north–south streets are named for influential College Park residents.

=== 20th century ===
During World War I's anti-German hysteria, the name of Wilhelm Street was changed to Victoria Street in "solidarity with our British brethren." At the same time Berlin Avenue was changed to Cambridge Avenue and the name of German Lane was changed to English Lane. The history of College Park has been closely linked with what is now known as Hartsfield–Jackson Atlanta International Airport—airport development having spurred several radical changes to the landscape of the municipality over the course of the 20th century. In 1966, a study funded by the Department of Housing and Urban Development suggested that the introduction and expansion of jet aircraft travel would place the airport and surrounding communities, including College Park, into conflict; ultimately, the study concluded that "the only effective way to control the use of land is to own it," suggesting that the airport would have to acquire the properties it would be in conflict with in order to expand.

In the 1970s and 1980s, large swaths of property in College Park were purchased using information detailed in The Hartsfield-Jackson Atlanta International Airport Noise Land Reuse Plan, which allowed the airport to apply for federal funding to purchase property deemed to be in so-called "noise land." The 1985 Chuck Norris film Invasion U.S.A. was notoriously filmed in these abandoned portions of College Park; houses owned by the City of Atlanta and the FAA were allowed to be blown up to simulate bazooka attacks, a decision that has faced modern day criticism due to the fact that nearby properties were still in the process of being purchased. This site would eventually, in 2003, in part be home to the Georgia International Convention Center; the center officially opened in 1985 at a separate location, but was relocated to the area in response to planned airport runway expansions. Today, the GICC is the second largest convention center in Georgia, featuring a carpeted ballroom and multiple spaces for meetings, conferences and conventions. It is the only convention center in the country that also houses a SkyTrain with direct rail access to an international airport. Directly next to the Georgia International Convention Center is the Gateway Center Arena, which opened in November 2019, home to the NBA's G-League College Park Skyhawks and where the WNBA's Atlanta Dream will play their 2020 season.

In 1978, the College Park Historical Society was founded in order to combat proposed northward expansion of the airport; the society succeeded in lobbying against proposed flight paths over the neighborhood colloquially known as Historic College Park, as well as registered swaths of homes and the Main Street commercial district with the National Register of Historic Places, eventually resulting in the establishment of the College Park Historic District.

Between the 1980s and the early 2000s, as part of continued execution of the FAA noise abatement program, the City of Atlanta and the FAA purchased roughly 320 acres of property (containing residential structures, churches, and some small commercial buildings) immediately adjacent to the west side of downtown College Park, resulting in a multitude of properties sitting abandoned for decades. The totality of these eventually abandoned properties purchased from the 1970s through the 2000s have been described as a major player in shaping a negative public image of the city, second only to the perception of crime in the area.

=== Early 21st century ===
==== Hip-hop ====
Although the Atlanta hip-hop music scene in the 1980s and 1990s was largely credited to artists from nearby suburban Decatur, College Park and the adjacent city of East Point have been strongly associated with artists and record producers from "SWATS" ("Southwest Atlanta, Too Strong"), who have substantially contributed to the evolution of the southern hip-hop genre over the course of the 2000s.

==== Gentrification ====
While the controversial process of gentrification started in the larger Atlanta Metropolitan Area in the 1970s, it was only in the latter 2010s that redevelopment substantially spread to College Park proper. In 2016, the College Park government embarked on a 20-year development plan which included goals "to expand its economic base while keeping its small town historic characteristics," and to "make use of its available land to attract new employers and residential opportunities." 2017 saw the construction of a mixed-use project which contained the first mid-rise apartments to be constructed in the city since 1969. From the 1990s and into the 2010s, the City of College Park succeeded in repurchasing the entirety of the 320 acres adjacent to downtown; in 2018, concurrent with substantial commercial and residential development in the area, the City of College Park announced major redevelopment of this abandoned area, now referred to as "Airport City," as part of a larger transit-oriented revitalization plan referred to as "Aerotropolis."

== Geography ==
College Park is located on the border of Fulton and Clayton counties. According to the United States Census Bureau, the city has a total area of 10.1 square miles (26.1 km^{2}), of which 0.019 square miles (0.05 km^{2}), or 0.19%, is water.

== Demographics ==
Historical population
Census	Pop.	Note	%±
1900	517		—
1910	2,173		320.3%
1920	3,622		66.7%
1930	6,604		82.3%
1940	8,213		24.4%
1950	14,535		77.0%
1960	23,469		61.5%
1970	18,203		−22.4%
1980	24,632		35.3%
1990	20,457		−16.9%
2000	20,382		−0.4%
2010	13,942		−31.6%
2020	13,930		−0.1%
2025 (est.)	13,887	▼	−0.3%
U.S. Decennial Census; 1850-1870 1870-1880; 1890-1910 1920-1930; 1940 1950 1960; 1970 1980 1990; 2000 2010; 2025

=== Racial and ethnic composition ===
College Park city, Georgia – Racial and ethnic composition Note: the US Census treats Hispanic/Latino as an ethnic category. This table excludes Latinos from the racial categories and assigns them to a separate category. Hispanics/Latinos may be of any race.
Race / ethnicity (NH = Non-Hispanic)	Pop 2000	Pop 2010	Pop 2020	% 2000	% 2010	% 2020
White alone (NH)	2,026	1,612	1,528	9.94%	11.56%	10.97%
Black or African American alone (NH)	16,545	10,950	11,017	81.17%	78.54%	79.09%
Native American or Alaska Native alone (NH)	28	36	31	0.14%	0.26%	0.22%
Asian alone (NH)	120	121	116	0.59%	0.87%	0.83%
Native Hawaiian or Pacific Islander alone (NH)	1	4	2	0.00%	0.03%	0.01%
Other race alone (NH)	30	30	90	0.15%	0.22%	0.65%
Mixed race or Multiracial (NH)	234	226	359	1.15%	1.62%	2.58%
Hispanic or Latino (any race)	1,398	963	787	6.86%	6.91%	5.65%
Total	20,382	13,942	13,930	100.00%	100.00%	100.00%

=== 2020 census ===
As of the 2020 census, College Park had a population of 13,930. The median age was 35.6 years. 23.5% of residents were under the age of 18 and 11.1% of residents were 65 years of age or older. For every 100 females there were 91.5 males, and for every 100 females age 18 and over there were 88.4 males age 18 and over.

100.0% of residents lived in urban areas, while 0.0% lived in rural areas.

There were 6,006 households in College Park, including 2,911 families. Of all households, 29.0% had children under the age of 18 living in them, 20.0% were married-couple households, 29.0% were households with a male householder and no spouse or partner present, and 43.0% were households with a female householder and no spouse or partner present. About 38.3% of all households were made up of individuals and 8.7% had someone living alone who was 65 years of age or older.

There were 7,090 housing units, of which 15.3% were vacant. The homeowner vacancy rate was 2.1% and the rental vacancy rate was 11.7%.

In 2020, of the College Park residents, 12,670 of them lived in Fulton County and 1,272 of them lived in Clayton County.

=== 2010 census ===
At the time of the 2010 census, there were 13,942 people, 5,595 households, and 3,208 families residing in the city.

Between 2000 and 2010, College Park saw a 31.6% reduction in population. The city government has suggested that this was due to the combined effects of airport expansion and the difficult nature of having housing constructed in areas previously considered to be "high noise."

=== Crime ===
For much of the 2000s, College Park – along with the other so-called Tri-Cities, East Point and Hapeville – has been popularly associated with crime; for example, a comedy/travel book originally published in 2005 describes College Park as "a nightmarish southern ghetto." Over the course of the 2010s, this reputation has been publicly challenged in the media, by Tri-Cities residents, and by the College Park Police Department.

The Federal Bureau of Investigation's annual Uniform Crime Report reveals that the College Park Police Department has historically reported a high crime rate per 100,000 persons as compared to other US jurisdictions. In 2008, College Park had one of the highest crime rates in Georgia, with reports including 13 homicides. However, 2008 was an outlier with respect to the rest of that decade and homicide; for the rest of the years between 2000 and 2010, between 1 and 3 homicides were reported annually. Further, it has been suggested that crime rate per 100,000 persons misrepresents the prevalence of crime, as College Park's daytime population is thought to swell to 50,000 persons (substantially more than the ~15,000 permanent residents considered in crime statistics).

The Uniform Crime Report and data released by the College Park Police Department suggests that the 2010s have brought a substantial decline in total crime, particularly in the latter half; in 2018, a total of 1,225 crimes were reported (compared to 2,695 in 2001, 2,530 in 2010, and 1,387 in 2017), 85% of which were property crimes. In 2018, there was a 13 percent decrease in Part I crimes and zero homicides as compared to 2017, following a 15 percent decrease from 2016 to 2017.

As of the 2016 American Community Survey, 35.7% of College Park residents are estimated to live in poverty which partly contributed to the crime problem.

== Economy ==
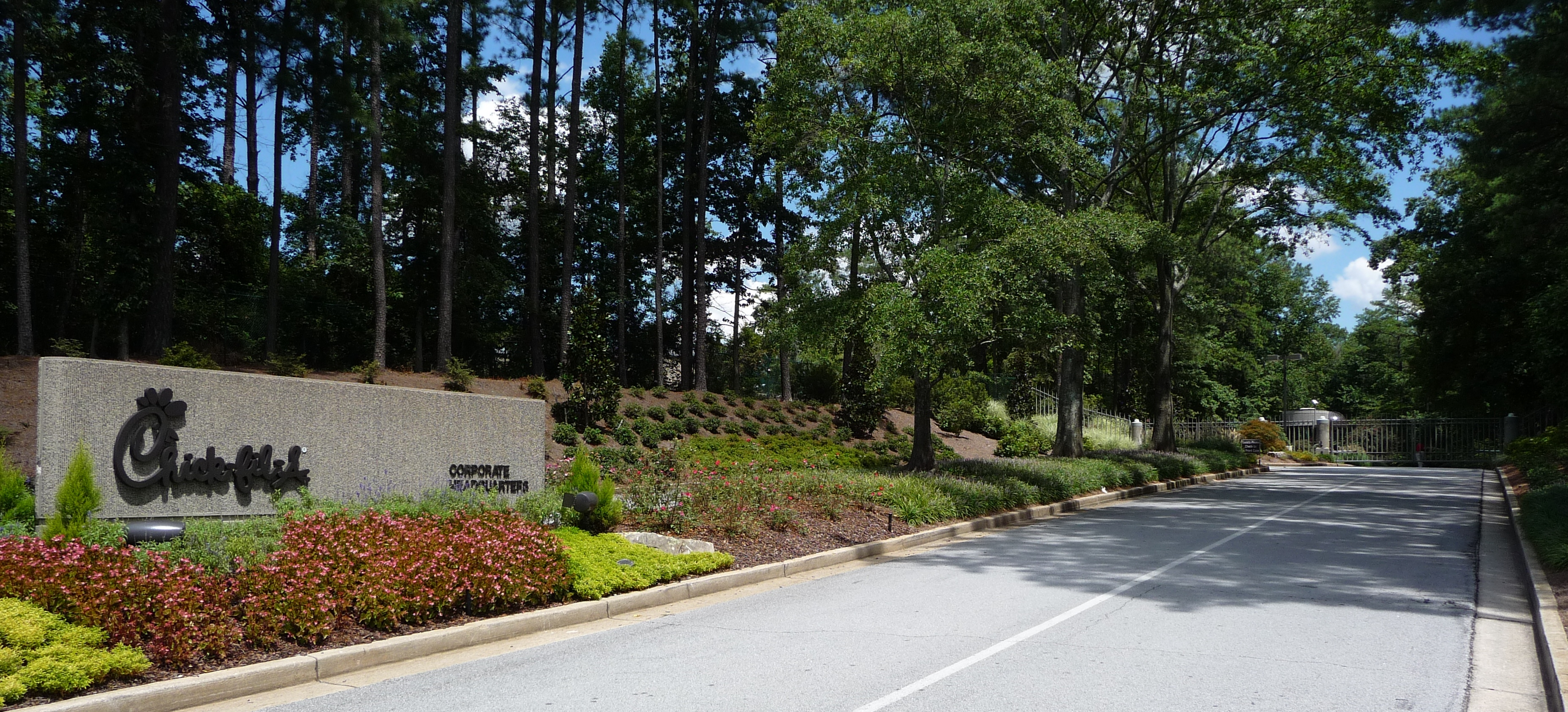
Chick-fil-A headquarters

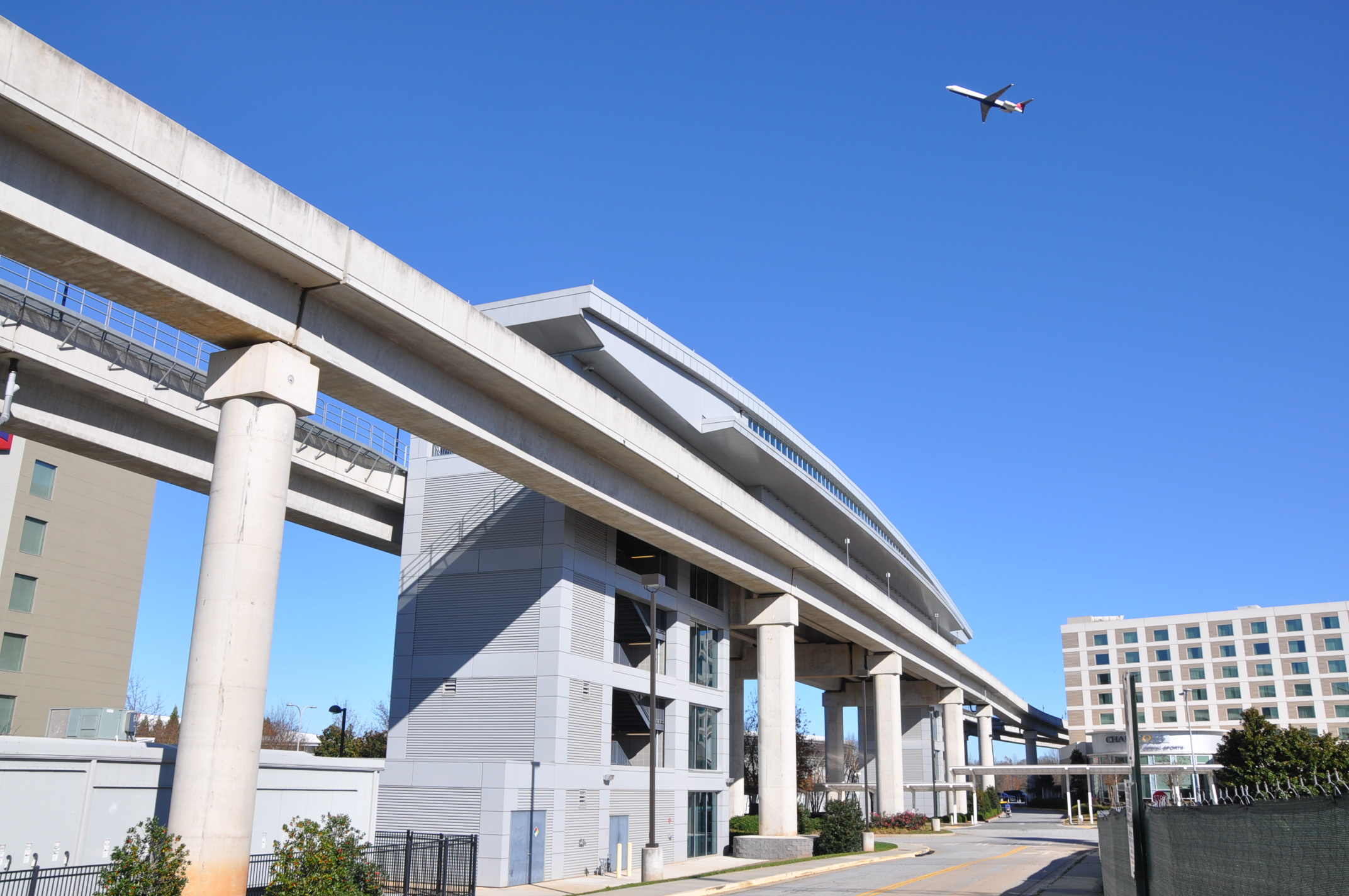
Georgia International Convention Center

Chick-fil-A, a fast-food chicken chain, is headquartered in College Park. Atlantic Southeast Airlines had its headquarters in College Park until December 31, 2011, when it merged with ExpressJet. ExpressJet took over the headquarters facility in College Park from 2012 until its bankruptcy in 2022.

The Georgia International Convention Center in College Park is Georgia's second-largest convention center.

Due to its proximity between the airport and downtown Atlanta, College Park is home to more than 5,000 hotel rooms.

In November 2019, The Gateway Center Arena at College Park opened to the public, home to the College Park Skyhawks (the NBA G-League affiliate of the Atlanta Hawks) and the WNBA's Atlanta Dream. In addition, the arena has an exclusive partnership with the Fox Theater to host shows.

=== Top employers ===
According to College Park's 2017 Comprehensive Annual Financial Report, the top employers in the city were:

#	Employer	Employees
1	Chick-fil-A	1,599
2	Federal Aviation Administration	1,300
3	Sysco	768
4	Southwest Airlines	664
5	Woodward Academy	630
6	Express Jet Airlines	532
7	Logisticare Solutions	403
8	VXI global	360
9	Marriott Hotels, Hotel #481	238
10	Marriott Hotels, Hotel #11005	206

== Arts and culture ==
=== Historic district ===
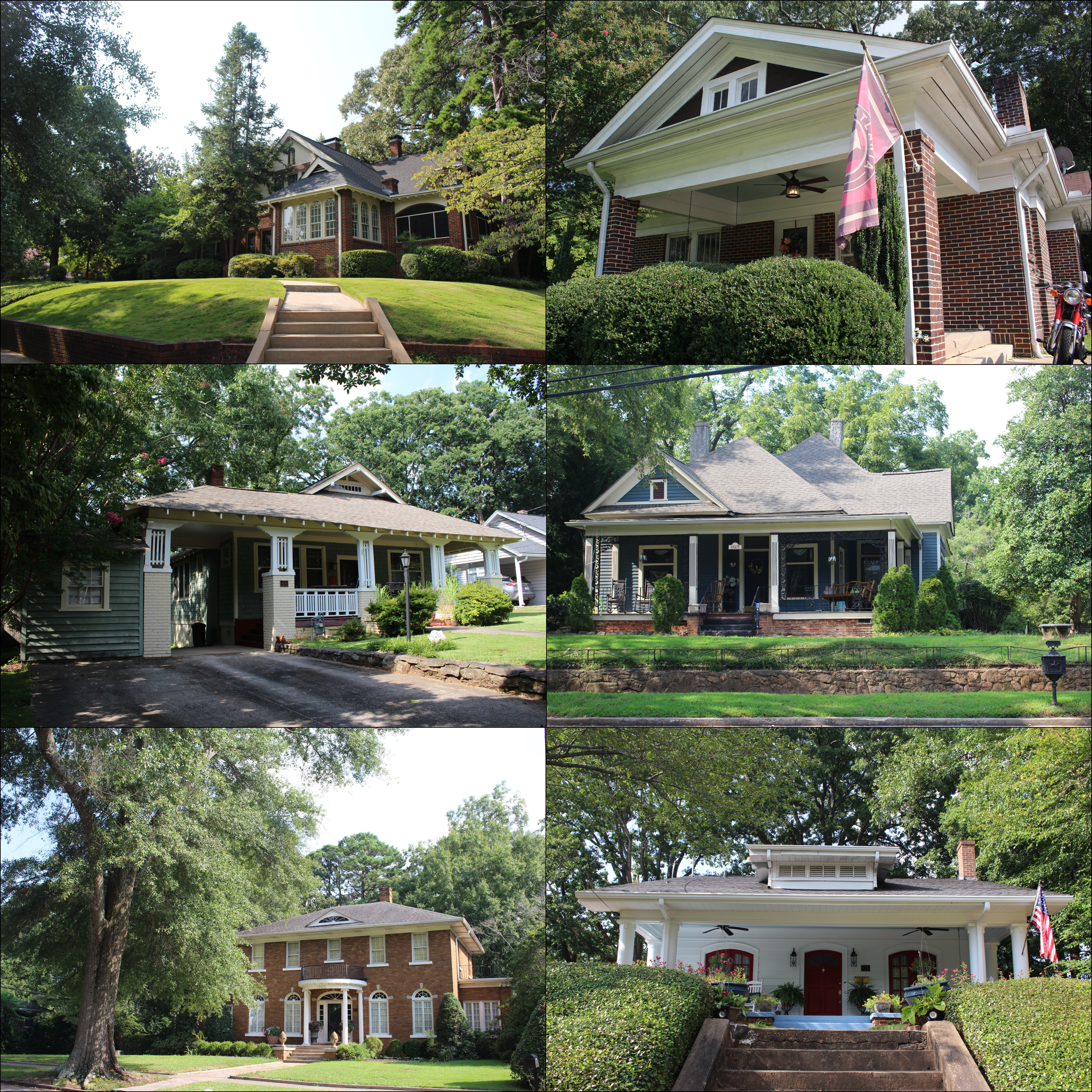
Historic homes in the College Park Historic District

The city center is part of the College Park Historic District, a 606-acre (245 ha) historic district listed on the National Register of Historic Places. The district contains 853 recognized historical resources constructed in the late 19th and early 20th centuries.

The majority of the historic structures are homes of the Queen Anne style, various Late 19th and 20th Century Revivals, and bungalows of the American Craftsman style, all dating from 1882 to 1946. Other major historical structures include: The College Park Woman's Clubhouse at Camellia Hall (1927); the College Park First United Methodist Church (1904); a United States Postal Service Office (1937); four schools (constructed between 1914 and 1942); and the College Park Depot (pre-1900), part of the Atlanta & West Point Railroad.

=== Public libraries ===
Atlanta-Fulton Public Library System operates the College Park Branch.

== Parks and recreation ==
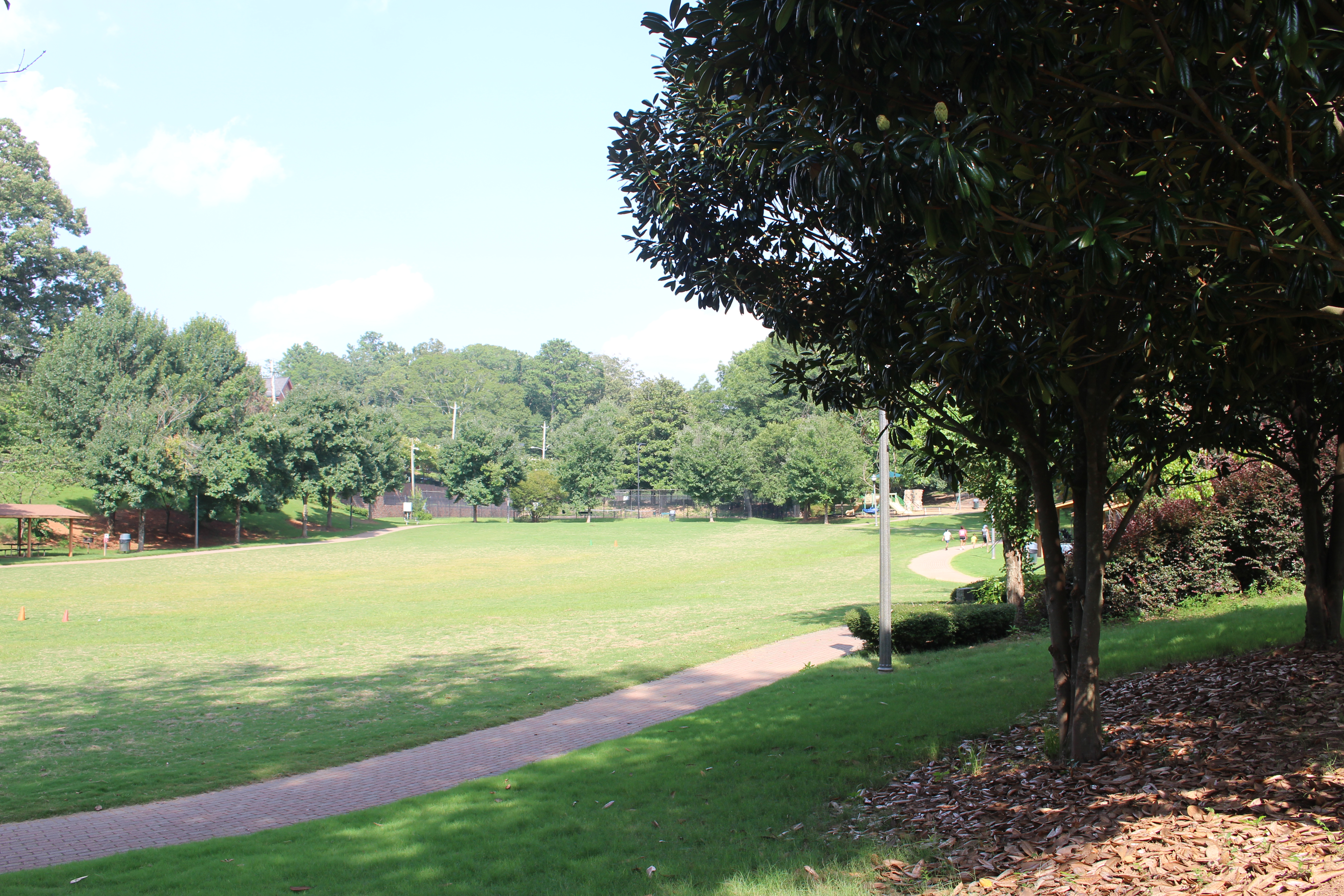
Barrett Park

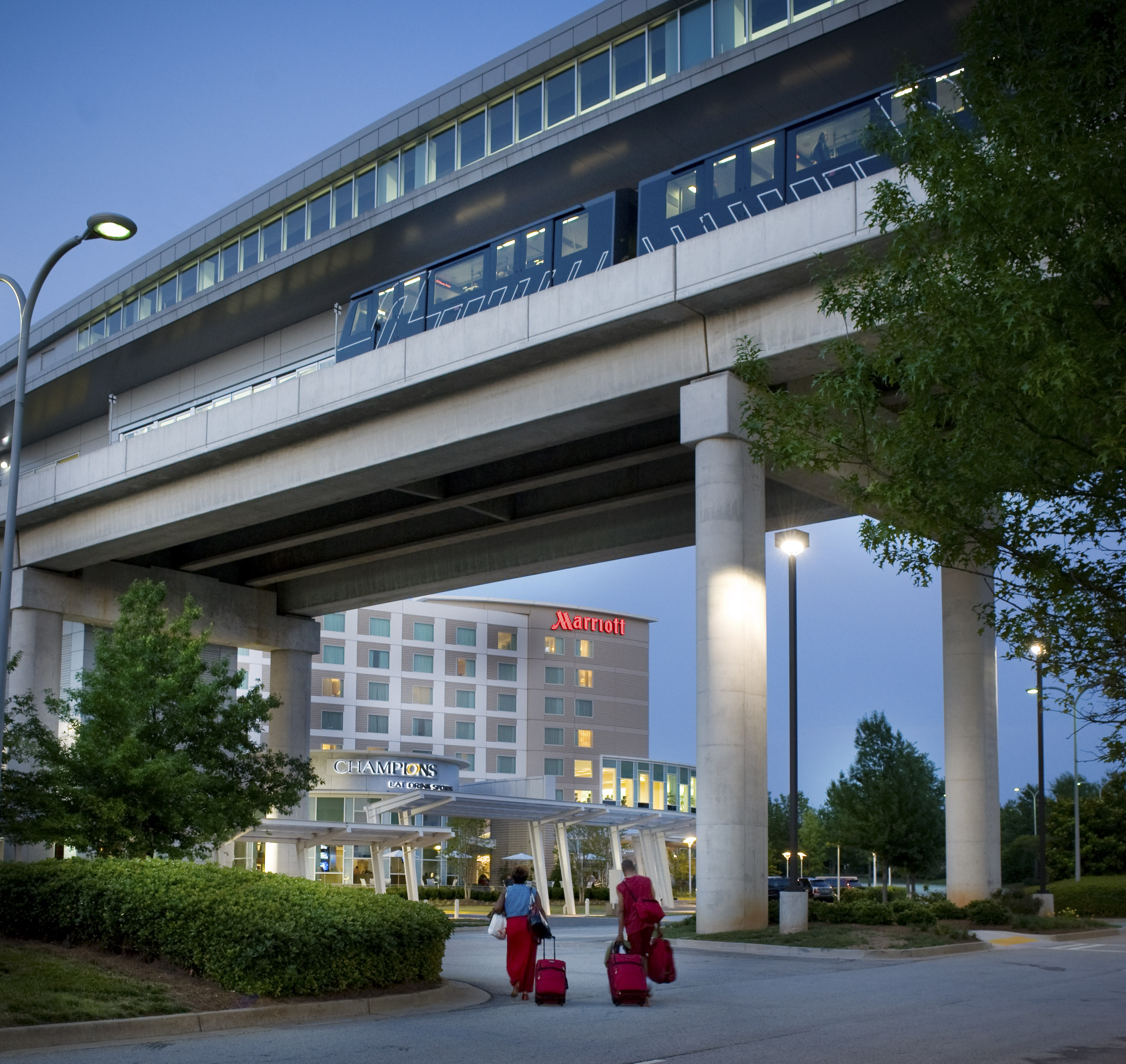
Gateway Center Arena

College Park has four public recreation facilities: the Wayman & Bessie Brady Recreation Center, named in honor of its first Coordinators; the Hugh C. Conley Recreation Center, named in honor of a former Mayor Pro-Tem; the Tracey Wyatt Recreation Complex, named in honor of the previous Ward III Councilperson, Tracey Wyatt; and the College Park City Auditorium.

The city has four parks: Barrett Park, which is located along Rugby Avenue; Brenningham Park, which surrounds the Brady Center; Jamestown Park; and Richard D. Zupp Park.

College Park is home to the College Park Municipal Golf Course, a nine-hole course established in 1929.

The Gateway Center Arena, a 5,000 seat multipurpose arena, is intended for public use, as well as to host the Atlanta Hawks NBA G League team, the College Park Skyhawks and the WNBA's Atlanta Dream.

== Government ==
The city of College Park is governed by a mayor and four council members. The current mayor is Bianca Motley Broom, the first female, African American mayor for the city, and the council members are: Ward 1, Ambrose Clay; Ward 2, Joe Carn; Ward 3, Ken Allen; and Ward 4, Roderick Gay.

The mayor is elected at-large, on a nonpartisan basis, for 4 year terms. The incumbent mayor, Bianca Motley Broom, has held the office since 2020.

Four council members are elected on a nonpartisan basis for 4 year terms, and each represents one of the four wards that make up the city. Legislative authority is placed in the city council, wherein each member is afforded one vote; the mayor oversees the deliberations of the council and is only entitled to a vote in the case of a tie.

== Education ==
=== Primary and secondary schools ===
==== Fulton County ====
Residential areas within College Park are served by the Fulton County School System.

Zoned schools are as follows: College Park Elementary School is in the city limits. Other schools serving sections of College Park with residences include the following: Heritage, Asa G. Hilliard in East Point, and Parklane Elementary School in East Point. Zoned middle schools serving College Park include and Paul D. West Middle School and Woodland Middle School, both in East Point.

There is also Main Street Academy, an unzoned charter K–8 school, located in College Park. Since 2016 it has occupied the former Harriet Tubman Elementary School.

Benjamin Banneker High School, in an unincorporated area, and Tri-Cities High School in East Point, both serve sections of College Park. Frank S. McClarin Alternative High School is located in College Park.

==== Clayton County ====
The section in Clayton County is served by Clayton County Public Schools.

The zoned schools are: G.W. Northcutt Elementary School, North Clayton Middle School, and North Clayton High School.

==== Private schools ====
Woodward Academy is located in College Park.

== Infrastructure ==
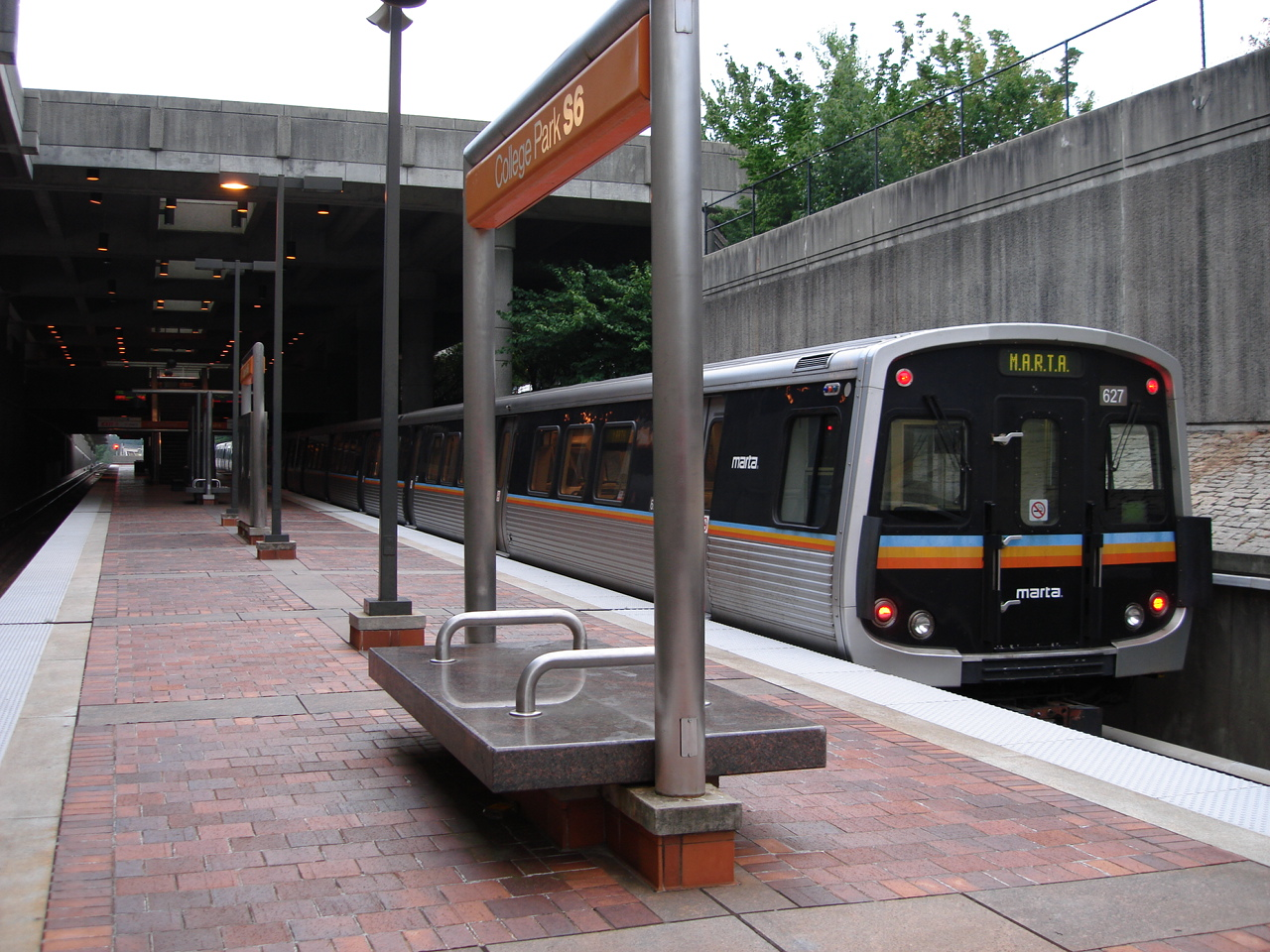
College Park MARTA station

The western part of Hartsfield–Jackson Airport, including its domestic terminal, is within the eastern side of the city.

=== Highways ===
- Interstate 85
- U.S. Route 29

=== Public transit ===
The Metropolitan Atlanta Rapid Transit Authority (MARTA) provides rail and bus service in College Park. College Park Station—serviced by the Gold Line and Red Line—is the third busiest station in the MARTA rail system, with a weekday average of 9,023 entries.

== Notable people ==
- Creflo Dollar, teacher, pastor, and founder of World Changers Church International
- Dom Kelly, activist, founder of New Disabled South, and member of rock band A Fragile Tomorrow
- Fletcher Thompson, politician
- Ralph Presley, airline pilot, politician, and mayor of College Park

=== Sports ===
- Morgan Burnett, safety for the Pittsburgh Steelers
- Bill Curry, football coach and analyst, former head coach for Georgia State University
- Keyaron Fox, Pittsburgh Steelers
- Dwight Howard, NBA all-star, 3× Defensive Player of the Year
- Jonas Jennings, director of Player Development for the Georgia Bulldogs
- Walker Kessler, professional basketball player for the Utah Jazz
- Margaret Martin, professional bodybuilder
- Cam Newton, professional football player, 2015 NFL MVP Carolina Panthers
- Sidi Njie, U20 Gold Medalist 4 × 400 m Relay, Bronze Medalist 400m, Team USA
- Josh Smith, professional basketball player

=== Music ===
- Jermaine Dupri, rapper, songwriter, record producer
- Kandi Burruss, member of the singing quartet Xscape
- Tameka Cottle, member of singing quartet Xscape and wife of rapper T.I.
- LaTocha Scott, member of singing quartet Xscape
- Tamika Scott, member of singing quartet Xscape
- Mr. Collipark, record producer
- Turbo, record producer
- Kap G, rapper
- Gunna, rapper
- Monica, R&B singer
- OG Maco, rapper
- Playaz Circle, rap group
- Rich the Kid, rapper
- 2 Chainz, rapper
- V.I.C., rapper
- Yung Joc, rapper

== See also ==
- Atlanta
