= A Fragile Tomorrow =

American alternative/powerpop band

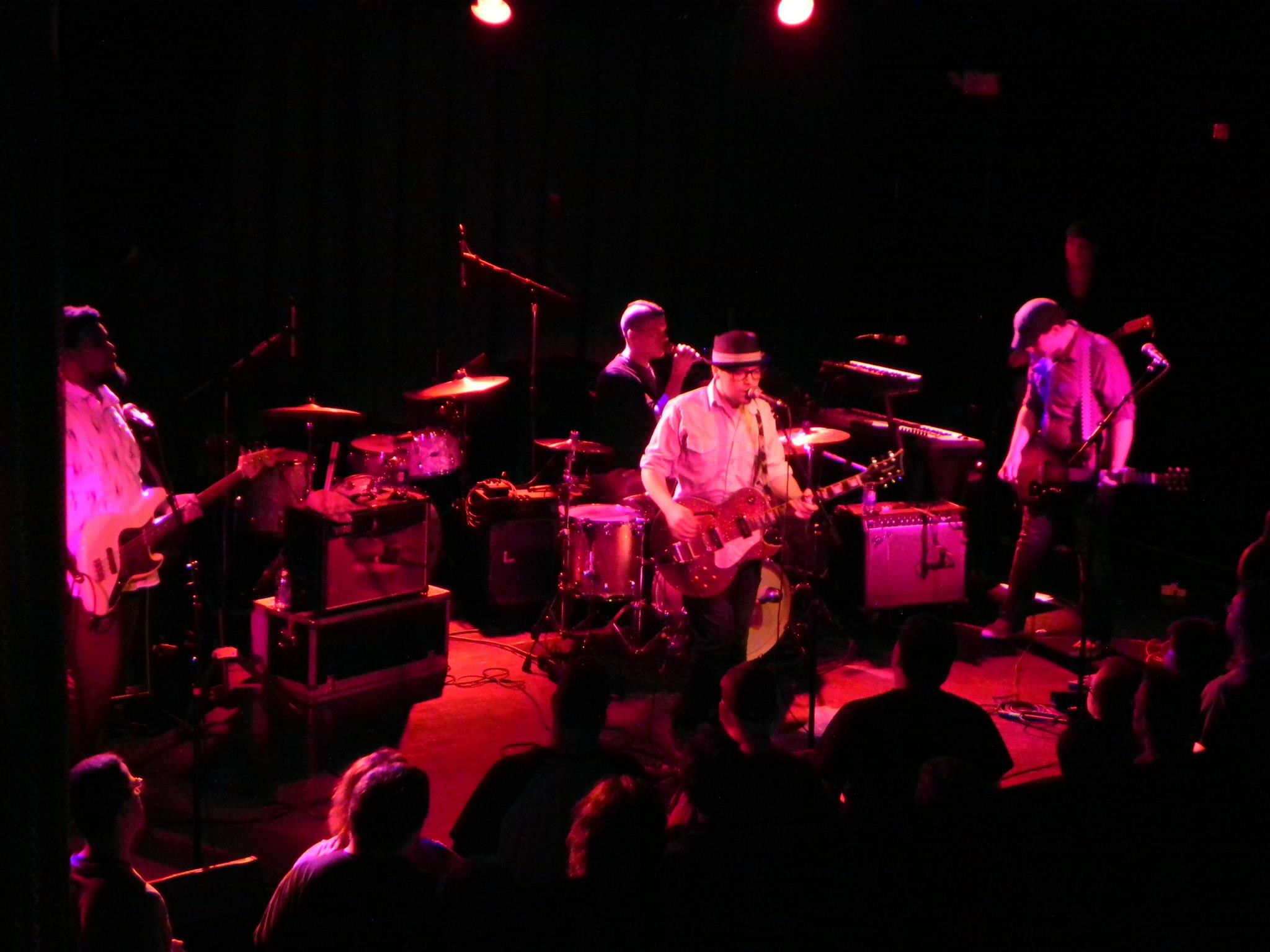
- A Fragile Tomorrow at Paradise Rock Club opening for Matthew Sweet in June 2012

Background information
- Also known as: AFT
- Origin: Montgomery, New York, United States
- Genres: Rock, power pop, jangle pop
- Years active: 2003-present
- Label: MPress Records
- Members: Sean Kelly; Brendan Kelly; Shaun Rhoades; Josh Kean
- Website: afragiletomorrow.com

A Fragile Tomorrow is an American alternative/powerpop band from Charleston, South Carolina, United States, formerly from Montgomery, New York. The group formed in 2003 and included brothers Sean Kelly, Dom Kelly, and Brendan Kelly. In 2006, bassist Shaun Rhoades joined the group. The band has put out six studio albums, most recently the critically acclaimed Make Me Over in 2015 and Generation Loss in 2019. As of 2020, they were working on their seventh record and third MPress Records release. The band has shared the stage with/opened for Indigo Girls, The Bangles, Matthew Sweet, Toad the Wet Sprocket, Garrison Starr, Antigone Rising, K's Choice, Drivin N Cryin, Continental Drifters, Blues Traveler, The Cowsills, Danielle Howle, Susan Cowsill, Amy Ray, and more.

== Early years ==
The band was first formed by brothers Sean, Dom, and Brendan Kelly. Sean and Dom are two of triplets, all diagnosed with Cerebral Palsy as infants, and their fraternal triplet died when they were 6. After first becoming a band in 2003, three years later, they had enough material for an album, which led to their 2006 debut. Soon after the release, bassist Shaun Rhoades was added to the group. After ending their recording/management contract with Audem Records in early 2007, the band began work on their sophomore release Beautiful Noise, which was produced by Malcolm Burn and released independently in 2008. Touring in support of this release led to the band deciding to relocate from their hometown of Montgomery, NY to Charleston, SC.

The band began recording the follow-up to 2008's Beautiful Noise, titled Tripping Over Nothing, which was produced by South Carolina musician Danielle Howle in the summer of 2009. The album features guest appearances once again by Peter Holsapple and Susan Cowsill, as well as Amy Ray of the Indigo Girls. Consistent touring in Charleston, coupled with time spent in the area recording their third album, prompted the band to relocate to the Charleston area in late 2009, where they have since remained.

The album was released on February 23, 2010. The band put out the record on their own label, Piewillie Records. They toured heavily in support of it, opening for Indigo Girls In December 2010, the band released a digital EP of acoustic versions of songs from Tripping Over Nothing, titled Palmetto EP.

Sean and Dom were featured vocalists on an Indigo Girls live release, titled "Staring Down the Brilliant Dream" which was released in June 2010. Additionally, they sing on the song "Closer to Fine" along with Michelle Malone and actress Jill Hennessy.

In February 2011, the band went back out on the road with Indigo Girls, opening the southeast leg of their tour.

On April 19, 2011, the band released a live record called Live at Awendaw Green that was recorded at a show in Awendaw, SC in December 2010.

In summer 2011, the band announced their plans to start work on their fourth studio record. Preproduction began in fall 2011, and recording began in January 2012.

On September 26, 2011, A Fragile Tomorrow announced via their Facebook page that they would be opening for The Bangles on the west coast leg of their November 2011 tour.

Sessions for the band's fourth studio record began in January 2012 with Mitch Easter. According to the band's Facebook page, the album feature contributions from Don Dixon, Amy Ray of Indigo Girls, Vicki Peterson and Debbi Peterson of The Bangles, and Easter himself.

Lead singer/songwriter Sean Kelly recently co-produced, engineered, and mixed Danielle Howle's new release New Year Revolutions, released in December 2011.

Sean and Dom contributed vocals to three songs on Amy Ray's 2012 solo release, "Lung of Love".

On March 29, 2012, A Fragile Tomorrow released a version of "Water's Part" by Let's Active, recorded with and produced by Let's Active front man himself, Mitch Easter for free download on their official site.

The band opened dates for Matthew Sweet in June 2012.

The band's fourth studio album, titled Be Nice Be Careful and produced by Mitch Easter and Ted Comerford, was released on January 8, 2013, via the band's Piewillie Records. The album was also released in Japan on the same day as its US release via Powerpop Academy/Thistime Records. Initially, the album garnered much critical acclaim, with Audiophile Reviews saying that "be nice be careful redefines powerpop for the 21st century" and Musoscribe claiming "If this is the state of powerpop in early 2013, things look good for the future".

The band played headlining dates in 2013 in support of "Be Nice Be Careful", as well as dates supporting both Toad the Wet Sprocket and K's Choice. It was announced that the band will again support K's Choice, under the name Bettens, in Belgium and the Netherlands in November 2013. On February 18, 2014, the band will release Belgique, an EP of songs from Be Nice Be Careful recorded live at Ancienne Belgique in Brussels, Belgium.

== Make Me Over ==
On July 8, 2014, the band announced they had signed a multi-album deal with NYC-based record label MPress Records, which also represents Rachael Sage, Melissa Ferrick, and Seth Glier.

The band's fifth studio album, Make Me Over, was released on October 16, 2015, via MPress Records, with several headlining shows surrounding the release as well as a U.S. tour supporting Indigo Girls and shows in Tel Aviv, Israel supporting K's Choice. The album features appearances from Joan Baez, Mark Hart of Crowded House, and Indigo Girls. It was produced and engineered by the band in Savannah, Georgia.

In October 2016, A Fragile Tomorrow announced they had been nominated for an Independent Music Award for their version of their cousin Richard Fariña's song "One Way Ticket" featuring Joan Baez and Indigo Girls. On November 12, they announced on social media that they had won the award for Best Cover Song. The band also announced that they had received 5 Grammy pre-nominations in various categories for Make Me Over.

Drummer Dom Kelly released his first solo album, Everything Is Just Enough, on April 7, 2017, on MPress Records. Singer and songwriter Sean Kelly is also set to release his debut solo album, Time Bomb, Baby in October 2017.

== Generation Loss ==
The band released their sixth studio album Generation Loss on MPress Records on February 22, 2019. The album featured a change in lineup, with Dom Kelly moving to vocals and keyboards with the addition of Josh Kean as session/touring drummer. The album was written after the loss of their mother Vicki to cancer in 2017 and was released to critical acclaim.

As of 2020, the band began working on their seventh studio record.

In May 2021, Dom Kelly announced his departure from the band, which officially happened the previous year. Sean Kelly alluded on social media to the band working with Peter Holsapple on their forthcoming album, which had been previously delayed by the COVID-19 pandemic.

== Discography ==
- Wishful Thinking (2006)
- Beautiful Noise (2008)
- Tripping Over Nothing (2010)
- The Palmetto EP (2010)
- Live At Awendaw Green (2011)
- Be Nice Be Careful (2013)
- Belgique EP (2014)
- Make Me Over (2015)
- Generation Loss (2019)
- It’s Better That Way (2022)

== Members ==
=== Main Members ===
Sean Kelly - lead vocals, guitars, synth, organ, electric piano, mandolin, accordion, programming (2003–present)
Brendan Kelly - guitars, synth, keys, programming, percussion, vocals (2003–present)
Shaun Rhoades - bass, piano, organ, percussion, vocals (2006–present)
Josh Kean - drums, percussion (2017–present)

=== Current Touring and/or Recording Personnel ===
Peter Holsapple - keyboards (recording 2021–present)

=== Former Members ===
Dom Kelly - drums, vocals (2003-2017) keyboards, vocals (2017-2020)
