= Bookstaver =

Bookstaver is a surname. Notable people with the surname include:

- Mary Bookstaver (1875–1950), American feminist, activist, and editor
- Sanford Bookstaver (born 1973), American film director, television director, and television producer

== See also ==
- Jacob Bookstaver House
