= Dom Kelly (activist) =

American disability activist

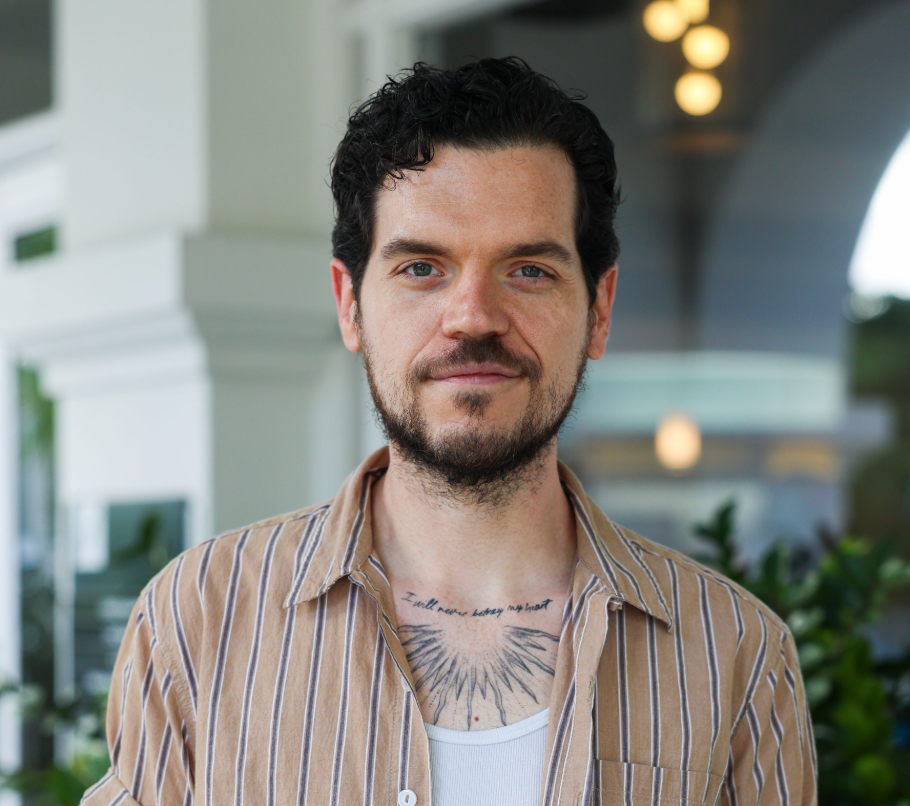
- Kelly in 2024
- Born: Valhalla; November 26, 1991 (age 34); New York
- Education: University of Pennsylvania (MS)
- Employer: New Disabled South
- Known for: Disability justice
- Honors: 2025 Forbes Accessibility 100

Dom Kelly (born November 26, 1991) is an activist, community organizer, social entrepreneur, musician, founder and CEO of the disability justice organization New Disabled South, and a founding member of the rock band A Fragile Tomorrow. Kelly, who has cerebral palsy, first became known for his music career with A Fragile Tomorrow, his collaborations with Indigo Girls, Joan Baez, Toad the Wet Sprocket, and more, and with his own solo project. After retiring from music, he worked with Georgia voting rights activist and politician Stacey Abrams at her organization Fair Fight Action and, in 2021, was tapped to build and launch Abrams' second run for governor of Georgia in 2022. He founded the organizations New Disabled South and New Disabled South Rising in 2022. He also began releasing new music again in 2026.

== Early life and education ==
Kelly was born in New York, the youngest of a set of triplets born prematurely and all later diagnosed with cerebral palsy. His mother, Vicki Stein, was Ashkenazi Jewish, and his father is the son of Irish immigrants. In addition to his identical triplet Sean and fraternal triplet Paul, Kelly has a younger brother named Brendan. When Kelly was six years old, Paul died in his sleep, which led him and Sean to start a disability awareness program in their school and served as motivation to write music. Kelly and his family moved to Charleston, SC when they were teenagers. Dom received a bachelor's degree in music production and a master's degree in journalism from Full Sail University, a graduate certificate in interdisciplinary disability studies from the University of Maine, and a master's degree in nonprofit leadership from the University of Pennsylvania where he also won the Excellence in Social Impact award. Kelly is also pursuing a Doctor of Public Health at George Washington University. He currently resides in College Park, Georgia with his wife and young daughter.

== Music career ==
Kelly formed A Fragile Tomorrow in 2003 with his brothers Sean and Brendan. In 2006, bassist Shaun Rhoades joined the group. During Kelly's tenure, the band put out six studio albums, most recently Make Me Over in 2015 and Generation Loss in 2019. The band collaborated with artists including Indigo Girls, The Bangles, Matthew Sweet, Toad the Wet Sprocket, Garrison Starr, Antigone Rising, K's Choice, Drivin N Cryin, Continental Drifters, The Cowsills, Danielle Howle, Susan Cowsill, and Amy Ray.

Kelly was a featured vocalist on Indigo Girls' 2010 live release Staring Down the Brilliant Dream, providing vocals on their song "Closer to Fine" along with Michelle Malone and actress Jill Hennessy. Kelly also contributed vocals to three songs on Amy Ray's 2012 solo release, "Lung of Love".

In October 2016, A Fragile Tomorrow announced they had been nominated for an Independent Music Award for their version of their cousin Richard Fariña's song "One Way Ticket" featuring Joan Baez and Indigo Girls. On November 12, they announced on social media that they had won the award for Best Cover Song. The band also announced that they had received 5 Grammy pre-nominations in various categories for Make Me Over.

In April 2017, Kelly released his debut solo record Everything Is Just Enough on MPress Records. The album featured appearances by Lucy Wainwright Roche, Chris Trapper of The Push Stars, Emily Saliers of Indigo Girls, Doris Muramatsu of Girlyman, Sam Bettens of K's Choice, and Mark Bryan of Hootie and the Blowfish. He toured in support of that album as the opening act for Indigo Girls and tapped Kristen Henderson of Antigone Rising to be in his touring band.

In 2026, Kelly began releasing new solo music. He released “cripfuck” in March and “Sad Stuff” in June. Also in June, Kelly and singer Lachi released “Moves” which they co-wrote for Lachi’s forthcoming children’s album on disability.

== Early activism, nonprofit, and political career ==
Kelly started organizing in Charleston, South Carolina at 17 years old, initially helping run the very first Charleston Pride Parade.

In 2018, Dom co-founded Sound & Vision Collective, a social impact agency connecting musicians with advocacy organizations. They created a 2019 campaign with PFLAG to advocate for the Equality Act, featuring artists including Indigo Girls, Antigone Rising, Smoke Season, Fantastic Negrito, and Ty Herndon.

After working for Stacey Abrams at Fair Fight Action, Kelly served as founding staff and Senior Advisor to Abrams on her 2022 run for Georgia governor. The campaign was noted for having a full department dedicated to disabled voters, as well the first political campaign to hire full time American Sign Language interpreters.

== New Disabled South and later ==
In May 2022, Kelly founded New Disabled South, the first and only regional disability organization in the United States. The organization follows the ten principles of disability justice, which were developed by the disabled queer and BIPOC members of Sins Invalid, and works to ensure disability justice is a part of every social justice movement in the U.S. South. The organization, as well its advocacy arm New Disabled South Rising, has supported the work of the Stop Cop City movement based in Atlanta, Georgia.

In 2023, Kelly told Waging Nonviolence that in regards to disabled people, the U.S. government would "rather throw people away than invest in giving them full lives and autonomy."

Following the October 7 attacks, Kelly organized with the Atlanta chapter of Jewish Voice for Peace to shut down the Jackson Street Bridge, calling for the Israeli government to ceasefire in Gaza.

During the 2024 United States presidential election between Kamala Harris and Donald Trump, Kelly criticized both candidates' records on disability, telling NPR "But I can't think of one political campaign that has done really phenomenal work around the disability community. And for the vast majority of political campaigns in the history of this country, they often do not have any meaningful outreach to the disability community, and we're not thought of as a powerful voting bloc."

In early 2025, following President Trump's remarks that the 2025 Potomac River mid-air collision was caused by DEI and the hiring of disabled people at the Federal Aviation Administration, Kelly appeared live on the UK's Sky News, saying, "This is par for the course for a man who has spent his life denigrating and devaluing people who deems to be less than him," and adding, "Donald Trump is a prime example of a mediocre man who, because of his immense wealth and privilege, has failed upwards his entire life. He wouldn't know what it's like to be excluded from a job because of a disability or to be legally paid pennies per hour."

In a 2025 opinion piece for Mondoweiss, Kelly called out worldwide disability rights leaders for their "silence" and "complicity" on the Gaza war, writing, "Stopping this U.S.-funded genocide in Gaza is the disability issue of our time."

In August 2025, Kelly authored a Teen Vogue article criticizing the U.S. government for funding Israel during the Gaza war, claiming that it led to Palestinians starving and arguing that starvation as policy has been "woven into the fabric of this country since its inception."

== Awards and honors ==
- 40 Under 40, Georgia Trend, 2024
- Forbes Accessibility 100, 2025
- The J.M. Kaplan Innovation Prize, 2023
- EDDIE Award for Social Impact, 2023
- D-30 Disability Impact List, 2021
- University of Pennsylvania Excellence in Social Impact Award, 2022
