= Wesley Wait =

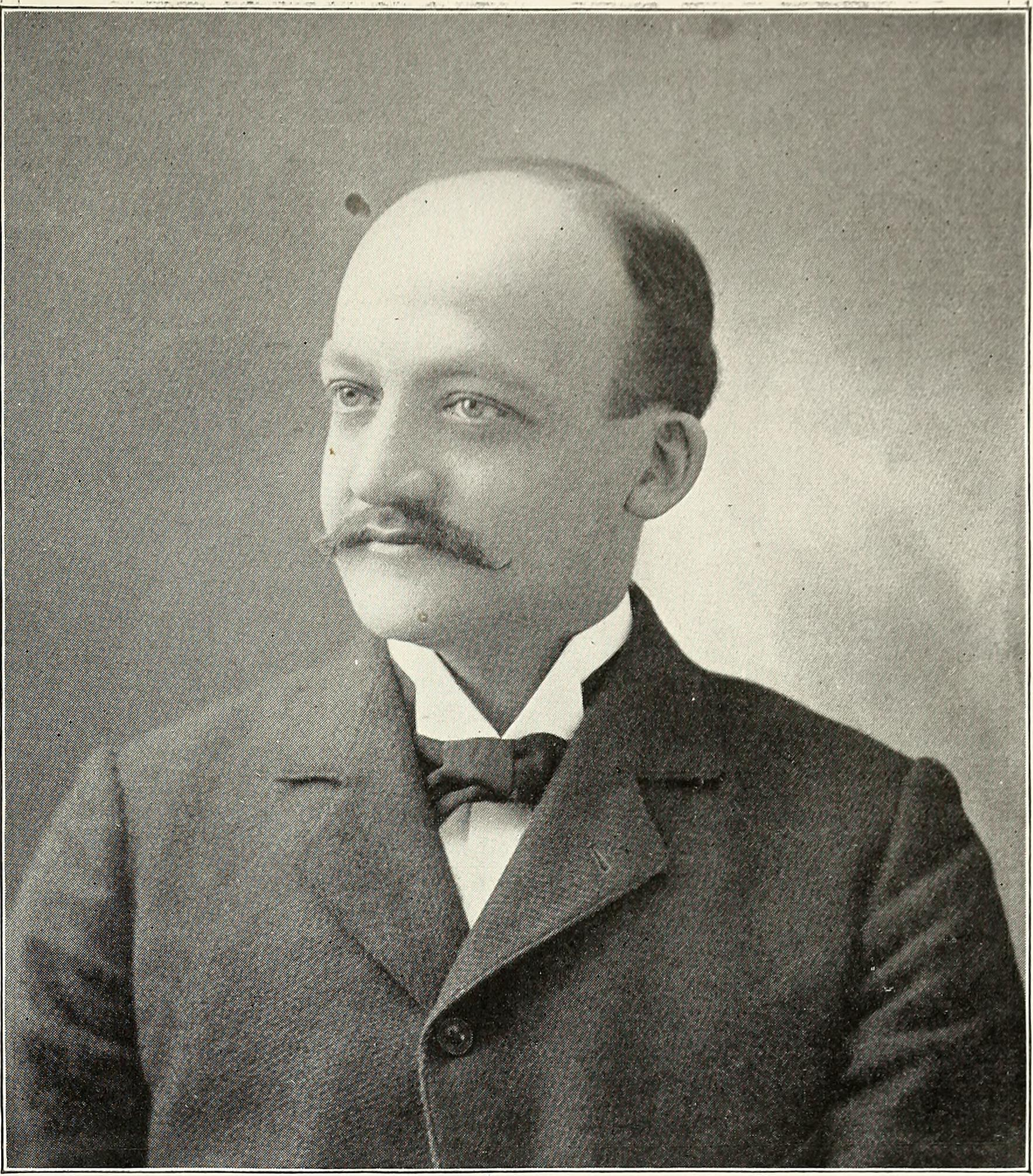
- Born: May 15, 1861; Montgomery, New York
- Died: July 16, 1949 (aged 88); Newburgh, New York
- Education: New York College of Dentistry
- Spouses: Emily Smith Rawlins (m. 1885; died 1897) Annie E. Knapp (m. 1905)
- Scientific career
- Fields: Dentistry

Signature
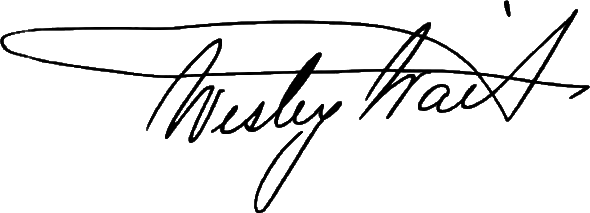

Wesley Wait (May 15, 1861 – July 16, 1949) was an American inventor, author, dental surgeon, and florist.

== Biography ==
Wesley Wait was born in Montgomery, New York on May 15, 1861. He graduated from the New York College of Dentistry in 1884, and in 1885 married Emily Smith Rawlins, daughter of the Civil War general John Aaron Rawlins. She died on March 25, 1897, and in 1905 he remarried to Annie E. Knapp.

Many of Wait's inventions have been patented and published in the Official Gazette of the United States Patent Office. Wait's patents included aerial vessels, bridges, greenhouses, frame supports, wire fasteners, and interlocking joints. In 1901 Wait wrote a book titled The Unity of the Universal Existence, and worked with the Smithsonian Institution between 1921 and 1925 to further his research in this area.
