= Rachael Sage =

American singer-songwriter (b. 1971)

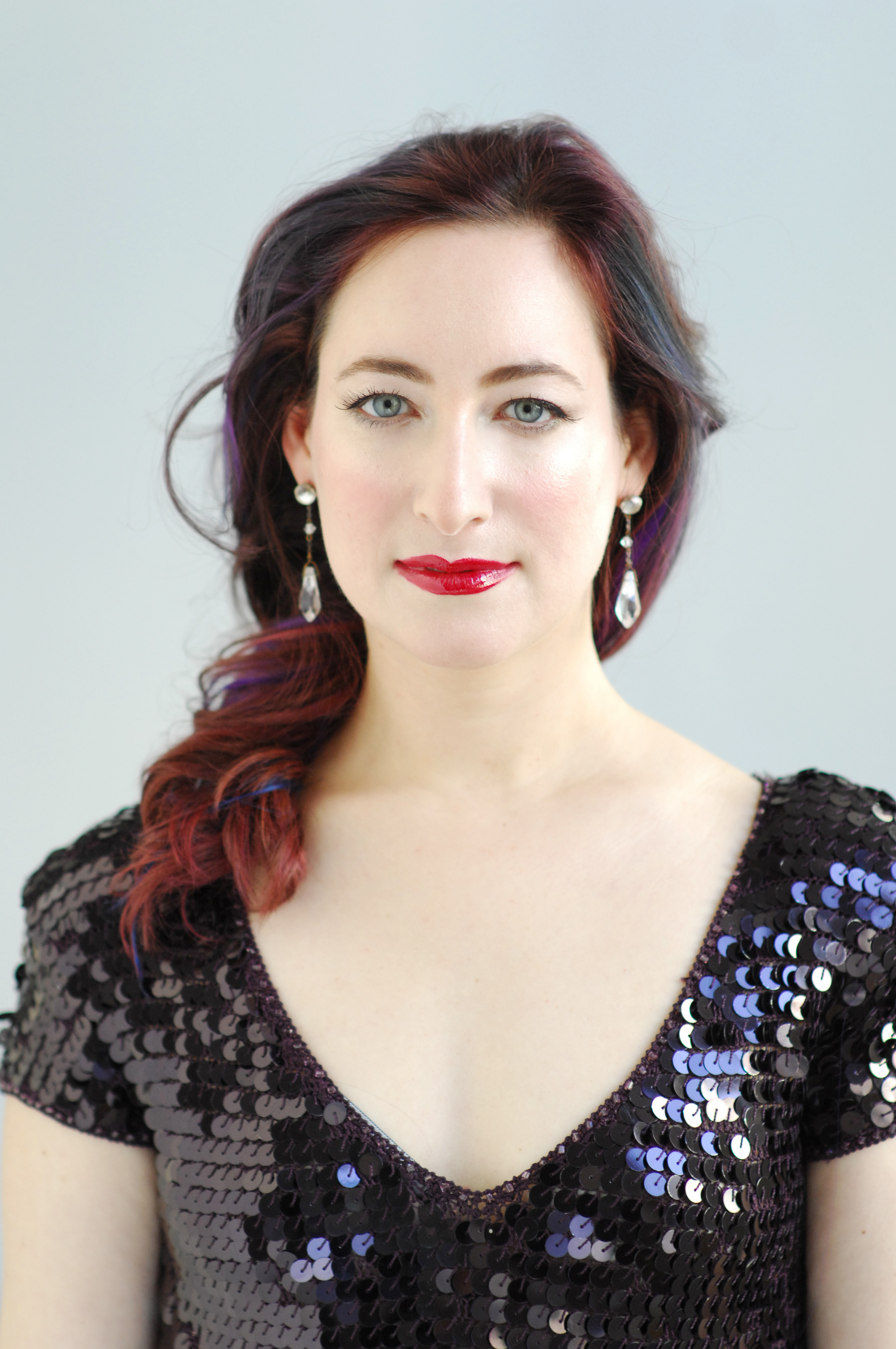

Background information
- Born: 1971 (age 54–55); Port Chester, New York, U.S.
- Genres: Pop; folk; rock
- Occupations: Singer-songwriter; visual artist
- Instruments: Vocals; keyboards; guitar
- Years active: 1995–present
- Label: MPress
- Website: rachaelsage.com

Rachael Sage (born Karen Rachael Weitzman in 1971) is an American singer-songwriter and visual artist. She is the founder of indie label MPress Records. Sage has released fifteen solo albums. Sage was named one of the Top 100 Independent Artists of the Past 15 Years by Performing Songwriter magazine. The New York Times describes Sage as "alternately channeling her inner Fanny Brice and Jewish Norah Jones".

== Early life ==
Sage was born Karen Rachael Weitzman in 1971 in Port Chester, New York, to shoe designer Stuart Weitzman and author Jane Weitzman. Sage studied drama and ballet before switching to music. A self-taught pianist, influenced by her parents' doo-wop and Beatles records, as well as Broadway cast albums, she created demos on a four-track recording system she received as a bat mitzvah present. During junior high school, Sage gained admission to the School of American Ballet. Sage attended Stanford University where she hosted a nighttime college radio show as "Full Moon Rachael". She studied theater with professors such as playwright Anna Deavere Smith, and graduated in 1993 with a degree in drama. For one year, she was in the Actors Studio MFA program. Her performance in their New York talent search won her a place on the Village Stage of the 1999 Lilith Fair.

== Music ==
Sage's career includes the writing of jingles and theme music for film and television; her first notable jingle customer was Crystal Light. She began using the name "Rachael Sage" in 1995, and in 1996 she started her own record label, MPress Records, inspired by Ani DiFranco founding Righteous Babe Records six years earlier.

On April 23, 1996, Sage released her debut album, Morbid Romantic, on MPress. She toured Europe four times and released four more albums.

For her 2004 song "Sacrifice" from the album Ballads & Burlesque, Sage won Best Folk/Singer-Songwriter Song at the 4th Annual Independent Music Awards in 2005. "Brave Mistake" from the album Delancey Street was nominated for Best Story Song at the 10th Annual Independent Music Awards in 2011. In the same year, Sage won OutStanding Producer for her song "Hope's Outpost" at the 7th Annual OutMusic Awards.

Sage wrote an editorial about homeless youth in New York City for The Morton Report. In her editorial, she mentioned a collaboration of artists, unveiling an album, New Arrivals Vol. 4: Artists Against Youth Homelessness, with proceeds going to the National Network for Youth.

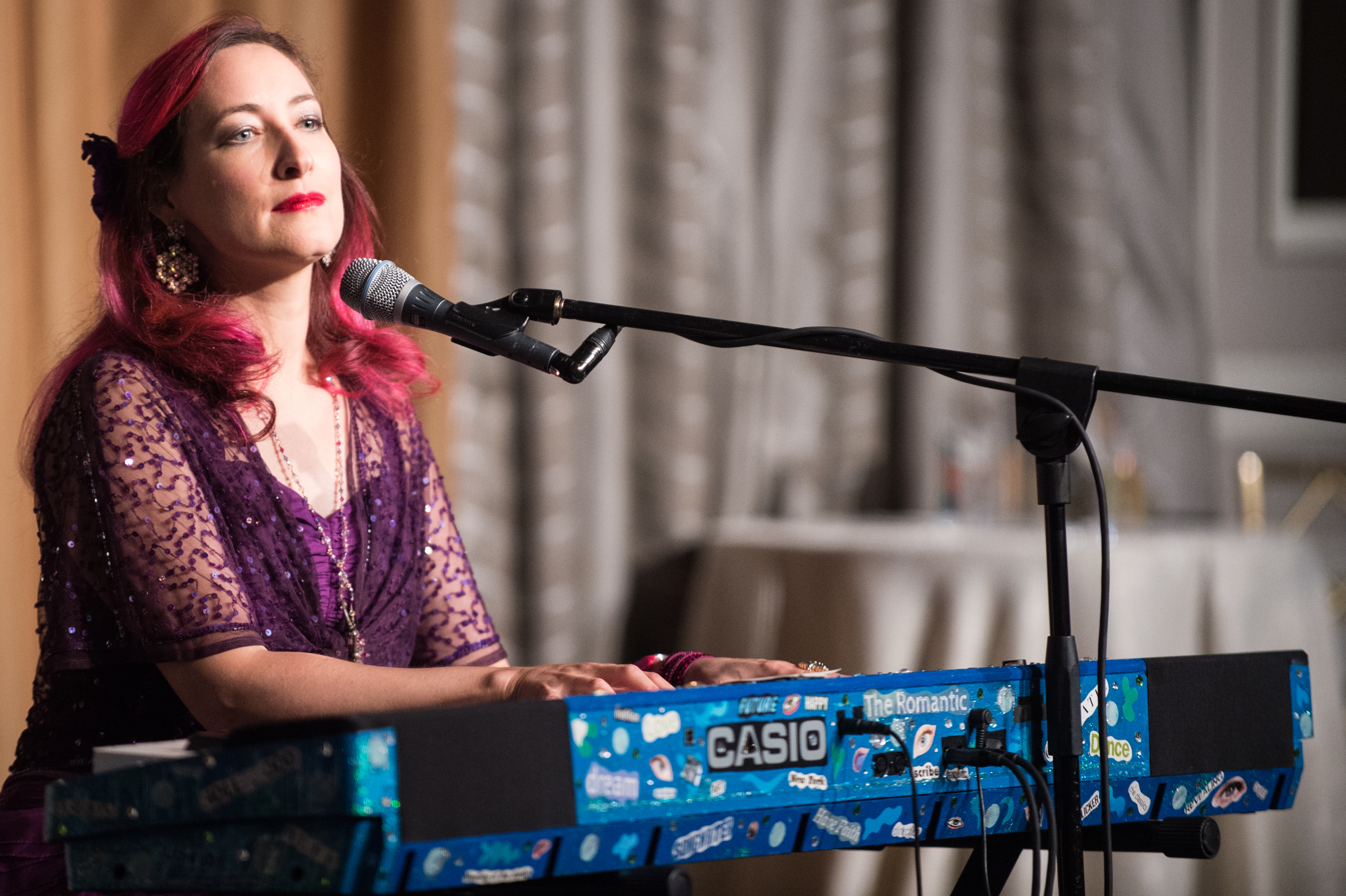
Rachael Sage performing in New York City in 2016

Sage appears on Both Sides Now: the Very Best of Judy Collins, performing a duet with Collins on the Neil Young song, "Helpless".

On May 20, 2016, Sage released her twelfth album, Choreographic, on MPress Records, featuring some of the songs that she wrote to accompany dance competition routines for Maddie Ziegler.

On March 6, 2020, Sage released her fourteenth album, Character. Described as an "inspirational tribute to survivorship", the album was written as Sage was recovering from endometrial cancer. She expressed the hope that "these songs honor just how resilient the human spirit can be, and remind us that sometimes it's ok to not be ok." The album reflects on themes such as compassion, gratitude, authenticity, optimism, mindfulness, forgiveness, vulnerability, and resilience, as well as issues surrounding co-dependence.

Sage regularly tours in North America and Europe and has shared stages with A Great Big World, Semi Precious Weapons, Sarah McLachlan, Judy Collins, Marc Cohn, the Animals, Jamie Cullum, and Ani DiFranco.

Sage's sound has been described as theatrical. Producer Phil Ramone said of working with Sage that he was reminded of collaborating with Bob Dylan and that "She has a very unusual way of treating a pop song. I admire her editorial and musical ability when it comes to crafting a tune."

== Visual arts ==
Sage's paintings and collages have been shown in small galleries in Lower Manhattan, and she has also contributed original artwork to her own CD package designs.

== Personal life ==
Sage's sister Elizabeth is a film critic and children's book author in New York.

Sage told Curve magazine in 2020 that she came out to her parents as bisexual in the mid-1990s. She said her songs portray her "full-range of life-experience, including having loved both men and women". Sage has been celebrated by the LGBT community, winning OutMusic Awards multiple times, hosted by the LGBT Academy of Recording Arts. In 2016, she teamed with cellist Dave Eggar to produce a benefit concert to help victims of the Orlando nightclub shooting, a hate crime against gay people.

In 2018, Sage was treated for uterine cancer; she was in remission two years later when she organized an online benefit concert to fight cancer, with appearances by Lisa Loeb, Paula Cole and more. Sage stayed in New Haven, Connecticut, during the COVID-19 pandemic.

== Discography ==
=== Studio albums ===
- Morbid Romantic (1996)
- Smashing the Serene (1998)
- Painting of a Painting (2001)
- Illusion's Carnival (2002)
- Public Record (2003)
- Ballads & Burlesque (2004)
- The Blistering Sun (2006)
- Chandelier (2008)
- Delancey Street (2010)
- Haunted by You (2012)
- Blue Roses (2014)
- Choreographic (2016)
- Myopia (2018)
- Character (2020)
- The Other Side (2023)
- Canopy (2025)

=== Acoustic albums ===
- Choreographic (Acoustic) (2016)
- PseudoMyopia (2019)
- Another Side (reimagined) (2024)

=== EPs ===
- Haunted by You – Acoustic EP (2012)
- New Destination (2014)
- The Tide (2017)
- Character (Acoustic) (2020)

=== Collaborations ===
- New Arrivals Vol. 1: Artists For Gulf Coast Hurricane Relief (2006)
- New Arrivals Vol. 2: Artists Against Hunger & Poverty (2007)
- New Arrivals Vol. 3: Artists For Eating Disorders Awareness (2008)
- New Arrivals Vol. 4: Artists Against Youth Homelessness (2011)
- New Arrivals Vol. 5: Artists For Hurricane Sandy Relief (2013)
- Both Sides Now – The Very Best Of Judy Collins (2014)
- Poetica (2021)

== Awards and nominations ==
Sage has received numerous awards and nominations, which includes winning the John Lennon Songwriting Contest in 2001, three wins at The Great American Song Contest, and six wins at the Independent Music Awards.

Selection of awards and nominations received by Rachael Sage
Year	Award	Category	Nominee/work	Result	Ref.
2001	The Great American Song Contest	Acoustic	Rachael Sage	Won	
2001	John Lennon Songwriting Contest	Rock	Rachael Sage	Won	
2002	Billboard Songwriting Contest	R&B	Rachael Sage	Won	
2005	OutMusic Awards	OutStanding Songwriter	Rachael Sage, Ballads & Burlesque	Won	
2005	Independent Music Awards	Song – Folk/Singer-Songwriter	Rachael Sage, "Sacrifice"	Won	
2006	The Great American Song Contest	Contemporary Acoustic/Folk	Rachael Sage, "93 Maidens"	Won	
2008	The Great American Song Contest	Grand Prize	Rachael Sage, "Hunger In John"	Won	
2009	OutMusic Awards	OutStanding Producer	Rachael Sage, "Vertigo"	Won	
2009	OutMusic Awards	OutStanding Songwriter	Rachael Sage, Chandelier	Won	
2011	OutMusic Awards	OutStanding Producer	Rachael Sage, "Hope's Outpost"	Won	
2011	Independent Music Awards	Song – Story	Rachael Sage, "Brave Mistake"	Nominated	
2019	Independent Music Awards	Music Producer – Pop	Rachael Sage & John Shyloski, Myopia	Won	
2021	Pop Awards	Icon of the Year	Rachael Sage	Nominated	

== MPress Records ==
Rachael Sage started MPress Records in 1996 to release her own music. She is the label's president.

Notable artists include:

- Rachael Sage
- A Fragile Tomorrow
- K's Choice
- Melissa Ferrick
- Seth Glier
