= Winding Hills Park =

Park in New York, United States

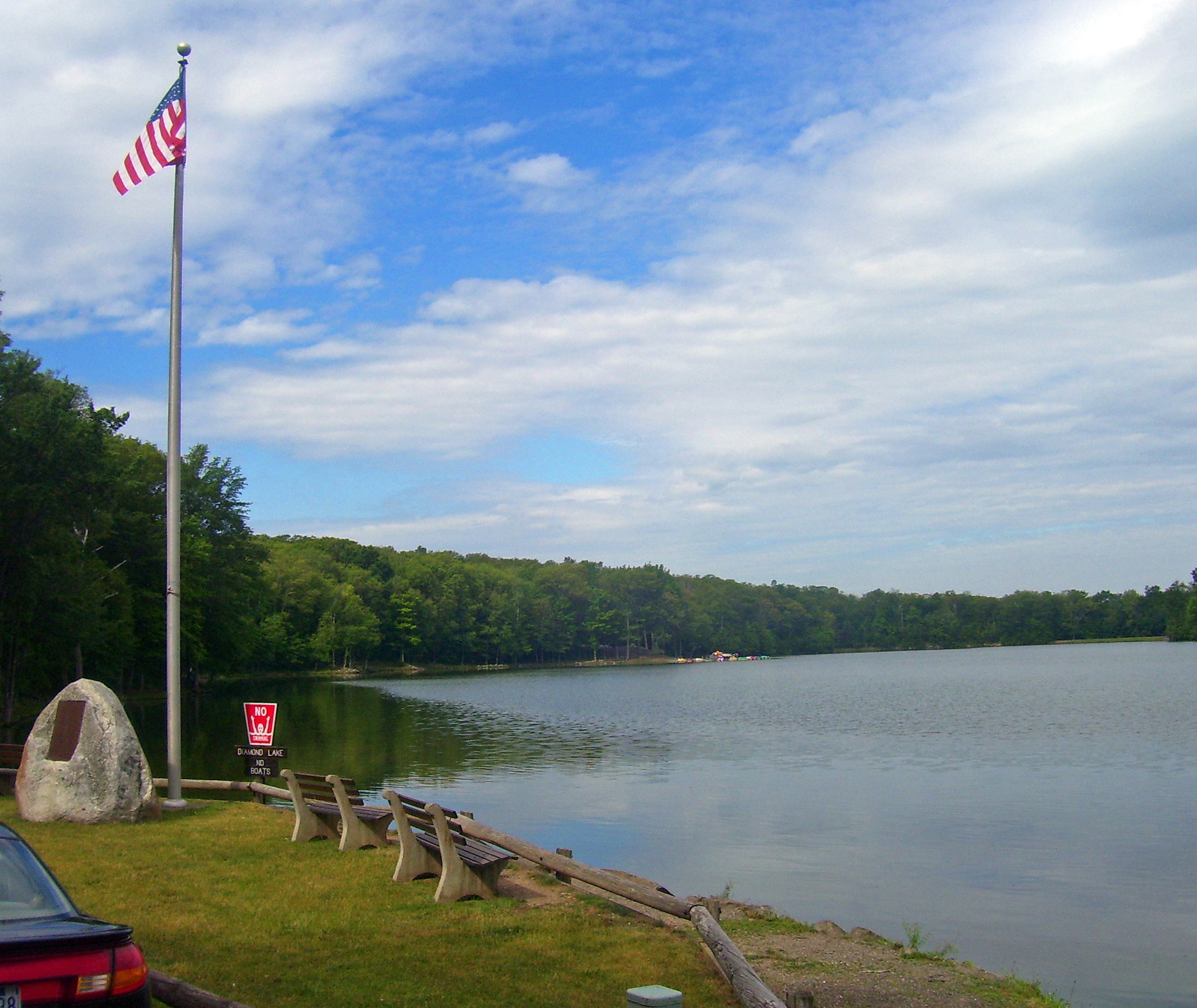
- Diamond Lake, the centerpiece of Winding Hills Park
- Interactive map of Winding Hills Park
- Type: Public
- Location: Montgomery, New York, United States
- Coordinates: 41°32′21″N 74°16′26″W
- Area: 502 acres (203 ha)
- Operator: Orange County Department of Parks, Recreation and Conservation
- Status: Open

Winding Hills Park is located off NY 17K in the Comfort Hills two miles (3.2 km) west of the village of Montgomery, New York, United States, straddling the Montgomery-Crawford town line. It is a 502-acre (203 ha) area centered on 40-acre (16 ha) Diamond Lake that is primarily used for outdoor recreation.

== Terrain ==
Much of the park is wooded, with some clear areas around the roads. The hills slope up to the east, and the terrain to the north and west remains gently rolling. Elevations range from 500 feet (150 m) above sea level at the west, where Pine Swamp drains toward the Wallkill River via a short unnamed tributary, to 780 feet (240 m) at the USGS Kimball benchmark.

== Recreational activities ==
The lake is available for paddleboat rental and angling in season, and two smaller ponds on the property are also open to fishermen. There are 51 campsites available for overnight use, between May and October, with payment of an adequate reservation fee. A 10-mile (16 km) trail system is open to hikers and horseback riders, as well as snowshoers and snowmobilers in winter.

A 20-acre (8.1 ha) picnic area with 40 individual picnic sites is available for use. Each individual picnic site contains a table and charcoal grill. A picnic shelter for group use is also available. The rental fee for use of the shelter is $150, for both Orange County and Non-County groups.
