= Ralph Presley =

American politician (1930–2022)

Ralph Lee Presley Sr. (July 4, 1930 – February 2, 2022) was an American politician.

Presley was born in Rome, Georgia. He served in the United States Navy during the Korean War and was a pilot. Presley lived with his wife and family in Newnan, Georgia, and was a commercial pilot for Delta Air Lines from 1955 to 1990. Presley served as mayor of College Park, Georgia, and was a Republican. Presley also served in the Georgia House of Representatives, Presley died at Piedmont Newnan Hospital in Newnan, Georgia, on February 2, 2022, at the age of 91.
