= Levi S. Backus =

American newspaper editor

- Born: June 23, 1803; Hebron, Connecticut
- Died: May 17, 1869 (aged 65); Montgomery, New York
- Education: Hartford Academy
- Occupation: Editor
- Known for: First Deaf editor
- Spouse: Anna Raymond Ormsby (m. 1829)
- Children: 2

Levi Strong Backus (1803–1869) is widely considered the first deaf editor in America, if not the world. He ran a newspaper called the Radii.

== Life ==
Levi Strong Backus was born in Hebron, Connecticut. He was named after his grandfather, Levi Strong.

In winter of 1836, Backus started a newspaper called the Radii which he ran for 33 years. Backus seems to have tried to raise awareness of his paper in 1837, as records show he sent copies to newspapers in Alabama and Michigan. The first issue, published in 1837, describes the oppression of deaf people and Backus argues "many persons of his class are deaf and dumb only in name" and that sign will become the universal mode of communication. The masthead of the Radii was a fingerspelt version of the title.

In 1838 and 1839, he "petitioned the State Legislature for funding to distribute his paper free of charge to all deaf persons in the state". The press, in 1840, burnt down so Backus started again in Fort Plain and renamed it Montgomery County Phoenix but was known as Radii and Phoenix. In 1844, he once again applied to the Legislature for subsidy to send out the paper to deaf people in New York. In his application, he says he "verily believes that he is the first and only deaf mute editor in the world..."

The success of Backus led to deaf institutes beginning their own papers, known as the Little Paper Family, the first being in 1847. Around 1870, Backus sold Radii to Kenry C. Rider who renamed it the Deaf-Mute's Journal in 1872.

== Personal life ==
He began attending Hartford Academy on April 27, 1817, and was the ninth student to attend. He left school in 1826 and in 1830, began teaching at the Central Asylum School for the Deaf and Dumb just outside Canajoharie, New York. The school closed in 1836 and Levi made sure his 33 students were transferred to the New York Asylum for the Deaf and Dumb.

Backus wed Anna Raymond Ormsby (1809–1886), a former student, on January 4, 1829. Together, they had two children, Bethiah Anna Octa Backus (July 19, 1830 – September 13, 1830) and Levi Nathaniel Backus (1834–1848).

After the fire in 1840 that burnt down his press, Backus, Ormsby and their child stayed in the United States Hotel in Boston, Massachusetts. Backus asked for donations from the public to start over.

Backus later became a book publisher, printing one book on grammar (1858) and another of poetry (1861). He died at age 65 in Montgomery, New York, on May 17, 1869.

== Bibliography ==
- The Chief Who Shot His Own Daughter (1840), now stored in the Library of Congress (credited as translator)
