= Staring Down the Brilliant Dream =

Live album by Indigo Girls
- Released: June 29, 2010
- Recorded: 2006–2009
- Genre: Folk
- Length: 128:35
- Label: Vanguard

Professional ratings
Review scores
Source	Rating
Allmusic	4/5 stars
The Music Box	3/5 stars

Staring Down the Brilliant Dream is a live album by the Indigo Girls, released June 29, 2010. "Staring down the brilliant dream" is a line from the lyric of their song "Love of Our Lives".

The album features contributions from Brandi Carlile, Michelle Malone, Trina Meade, Sean Kelly and Dom Kelly of A Fragile Tomorrow, Jill Hennessy, Common Rotation, and Julie Wolf.

== Track listing ==
Disc One
No.	Title	Writer(s)	Length
1.	"Heartache for Everyone" (Vic Theatre; Chicago, IL; 10.27.06 – day 1)	Amy Ray	3:19
2.	"Closer to Fine" (Mayo Center for Performing Arts; Morristown, NJ; 10.03.09)	Emily Saliers	4:19
3.	"Go" (Ventura Theatre; Ventura, CA; 11.11.06)	Ray	4:11
4.	"Come on Home" (Capitol Center For The Arts; Concord, NH; 10.04.09)	Saliers	4:40
5.	"Devotion" (Mayo Center For Performing Arts; Morristown, NJ; 10.03.09)	Ray	3:23
6.	"Cold Beer and Remote Control" (Bijou Theatre; Knoxville, TN; 09.25.09)	Saliers	3:52
7.	"Moment of Forgiveness" (Lincoln Theatre; Yountville, CA; 06.24.08)	Ray	3:13
8.	"Fill It Up Again" (McCaw Hall; Seattle, WA; 11.05.06)	Saliers	3:46
9.	"Sugar Tongue" (Capitol Center For The Arts; Concord, NH; 10.04.09)	Ray	3:45
10.	"Fly Away" (McCaw Hall; Seattle, WA; 11.05.06)	Saliers	3:20
11.	"Ozilline" (Wolf Trap; Vienna, VA; 07.17.08)	Ray	4:15
12.	"Don't Think Twice, It's All Right" (Lincoln Theatre; Yountville, CA; 06.24.08)	Bob Dylan	3:21
13.	"Kid Fears" (The Pageant; St. Louis, MO; 10.26.06)	Ray	4:22
14.	"Watershed" (The Pageant; St. Louis, MO; 10.26.06)	Saliers	4:49
15.	"Shame on You" (Ventura Theatre; Ventura, CA; 11.11.06)	Ray	4:34

Disc Two
No.	Title	Writer(s)	Length
1.	"Get Out the Map" (McCaw Hall; Seattle, WA; 11.05.06)	Saliers	3:31
2.	"Salty South" (Performing Arts Center; San Luis Obispo, CA; 07.11.09)	Ray	4:41
3.	"The Wood Song" (Mayo Center For Performing Arts; Morristown, NJ; 10.03.09)	Saliers	3:55
4.	"Three County Highway" (Vic Theatre; Chicago, IL; 10.28.06 – day 2)	Ray	3:40
5.	"Digging For Your Dream" (Whitaker Center; Harrisburg, PA; 10.01.09)	Saliers	4:23
6.	"Rock and Roll Heaven's Gate" (Vic Theatre; Chicago, IL; 10.27.06 – day 1)	Ray	3:13
7.	"I Believe in Love" (McCaw Hall; Seattle, WA; 11.05.06)	Saliers	3:38
8.	"Fugitive" (Mayo Center For Performing Arts; Morristown, NJ; 10.03.09)	Ray	4:51
9.	"Cordova" (Capitol Center For The Arts; Concord, NH; 07.13.08)	Ray	4:25
10.	"What Are You Like" (Whitaker Center; Harrisburg, PA; 10.01.09)	Saliers	2:47
11.	"Second Time Around" (Mayo Center For Performing Arts; Morristown, NJ; 10.03.09)	Ray	4:38
12.	"Love of Our Lives" (Capitol Center For The Arts; Concord, NH; 10.04.09)	Saliers	3:42
13.	"Become You" (Music Hall; Tarrytown, NY; 10.02.09)	Ray	4:00
14.	"Prince of Darkness" (The Paramount Theatre; Rutland, VT; 07.15.08)	Saliers	5:17
15.	"Tether" (Ventura Theatre; Ventura, CA; 11.11.06)	Ray	6:27
16.	"Wild Horses" (Capitol Center For The Arts; Concord, NH; 10.04.09 – Rolling Stones cover)	Jagger/Richards	6:20

== Personnel ==
=== Musicians ===
In descending order of tracks contributed to:

- Emily Saliers – lead vocals (own compositions plus parts of 1:12 and 2:16), harmony vocals (others), acoustic guitar (1:2, 1:4-10, 1:12-14, 2:2-3, 2:5, 2:8, 2:10-12, 2:14, 2:16), acoustic slide guitar (2:4), 12-string acoustic guitar (2:13), electric guitar (1:1, 1:3, 1:15, 2:6, 2:15), banjo (1:11, 2:1), ukulele (2:7)
- Amy Ray – lead vocals (own compositions plus parts of 1:12 and 2:16), harmony vocals (others except 1:10), acoustic guitar (1:2, 1:4-9, 1:13-14, 2:2-3, 2:7-8, 2:10, 2:12-14), electric guitar (1:1, 1:3, 1:15, 2:4-6, 2:15), mandolin (1:11-12, 2:1, 2:9, 2:11, 2:16), harmonica (2:13)
- Matt Chamberlain – drums (1:1, 1:3, 1:8, 1:10, 1:13, 1:15, 2:1, 2:4-7, 2:15), loops (2:5)
- Carol Isaacs – keyboards (1:1, 1:3, 1:8, 1:10, 1:13, 2:4, 2:6-7, 2:15), accordion (1:15, 2:1), vocals (1:1, 1:3, 2:1)
- Clare Kenny – bass (1:1, 1:3, 1:8, 1:10, 1:13, 1:15, 2:1, 2:4, 2:6-7, 2:15), vocals (1:1, 1:3, 2:1)
- Julie Wolf – accordion (1:2, 1:5, 1:11, 2:13), keyboards (1:9, 1:11, 2:5, 2:9, 2:12, piano (1:4, 2:8, 2:14), vocals (1:2, 1:4, 1:7, 1:11, 2:8, 2:13-14)
- Brandi Carlile – vocals and guitar (1:11-12)
- Jill Hennessey – vocals (1:2)
- Dominic Kelly – vocals (1:2)
- Sean Kelly - vocals (1:2)
- Adam Busch – harmonica and vocals (2:2)
- Jordan Katz – banjo and vocals (2:2)
- Eric Kufs – vocals (2:2)
- Ryan Raddatz – mandolin (2:2)
- Trina Meade – vocals (1:13)
- Michelle Malone – vocals and guitar (2:16)
