= Jacob Bookstaver House =

Historic house in New York, United States

- U.S. National Register of Historic Places
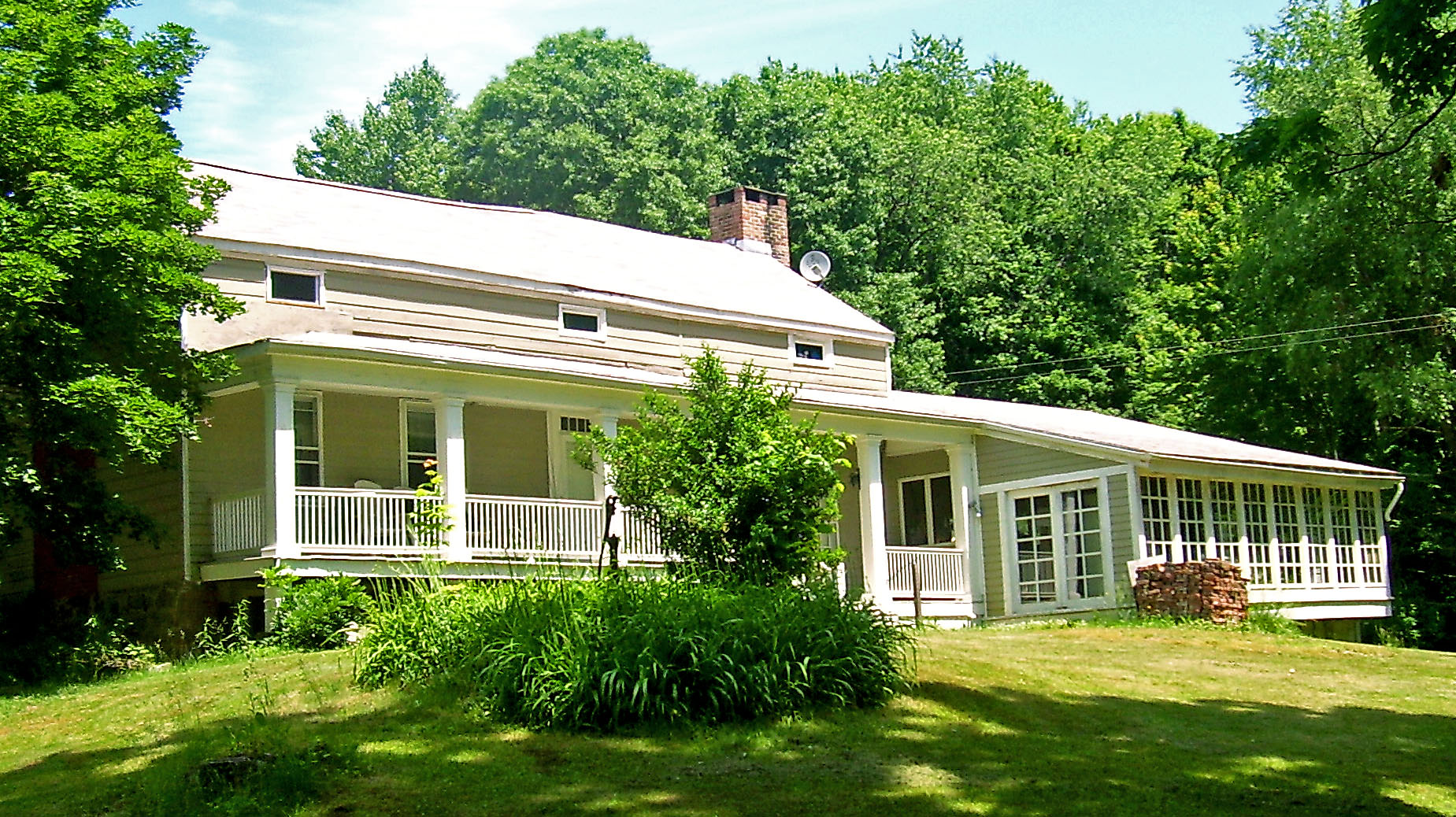
- The house in 2007
- Location: Town of Montgomery, NY
- Nearest city: Newburgh
- Coordinates: 41°34′23″N 74°13′26″W
- Built: 1779
- Architectural style: Greek Revival
- NRHP reference No.: 96000558
- Added to NRHP: 1996

The Jacob Bookstaver House is located off Albany Post Road in Orange County, New York's Town of Montgomery, not far from The Smith House. It has been a Registered Historic Place since 1996.

Bookstaver, a Palatine German, was among the earliest settlers of the town. After spending his first winter in a makeshift cave with several other settlers and their families, he bought an 800-acre (320 ha) tract including the current location of the house with three partners in 1735. The original portion of the current house was built in 1779, with the Greek Revival wing added by his descendants in 1850.

The house was added to the Register in 1996.
