= Abraham Dickerson Farmhouse =

Historic house in New York, United States

- U.S. National Register of Historic Places
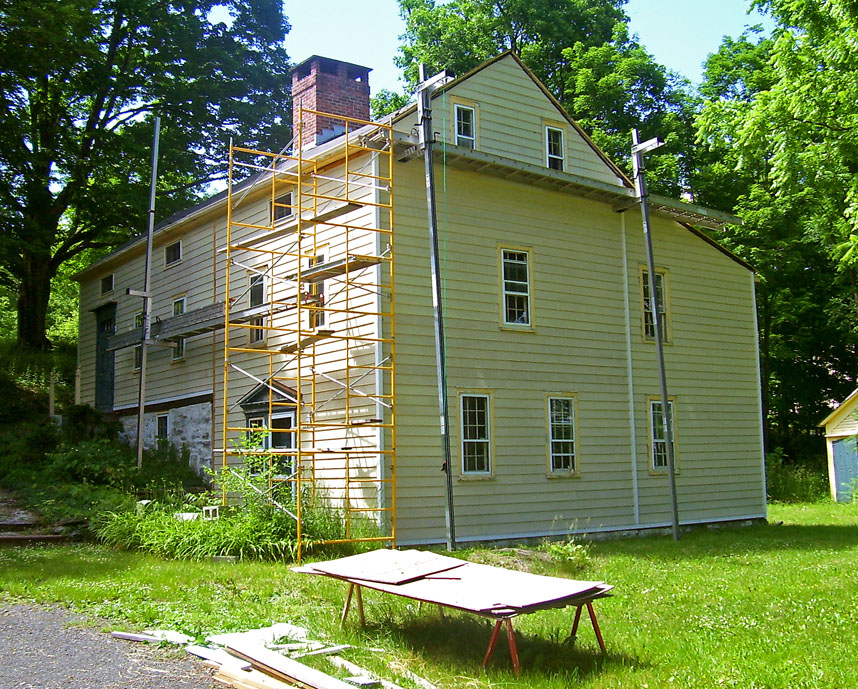
- The house undergoing some renovation in 2007

- Location within New York Location within the United States
- Location: Town of Montgomery, NY
- Nearest city: Newburgh
- Coordinates: 41°34′20″N 74°15′11″W
- Built: late 18th century
- Architectural style: Federal style, Greek Revival
- NRHP reference No.: 95001286
- Added to NRHP: November 3, 1995

The Abraham Dickerson Farmhouse is a historic residence in the town of Montgomery in Orange County, New York, United States. It is located on West Searsville Road, which was originally the driveway to its entrance.

== History ==
Abraham Dickerson emigrated to the Hudson Valley from Long Island during the 1760s. He married Anna Mould, the daughter of a prominent local family, and he bought land and built the house and a sawmill on the nearby Dwaar Kill, a tributary of the Wallkill River. The sawmill ceased operations at the end of the century, and a member of another prominent local family, the Van Alsts, bought the house in 1829. Renovations undertaken during this time were in the Greek Revival style then popular.

The back of the house was designed to be a dancing parlor, and both the Dickersons and Van Alsts held many parties there on Saturday nights. When it was used as a boardinghouse in the 1920s, the dances were still well-attended enough that tenants were required to make sure it was available every week.

After that time, the house fell into disuse and was abandoned. It was renovated in the late 1970s and added to the National Register of Historic Places in 1995.
