= Seth Glier =

American musician

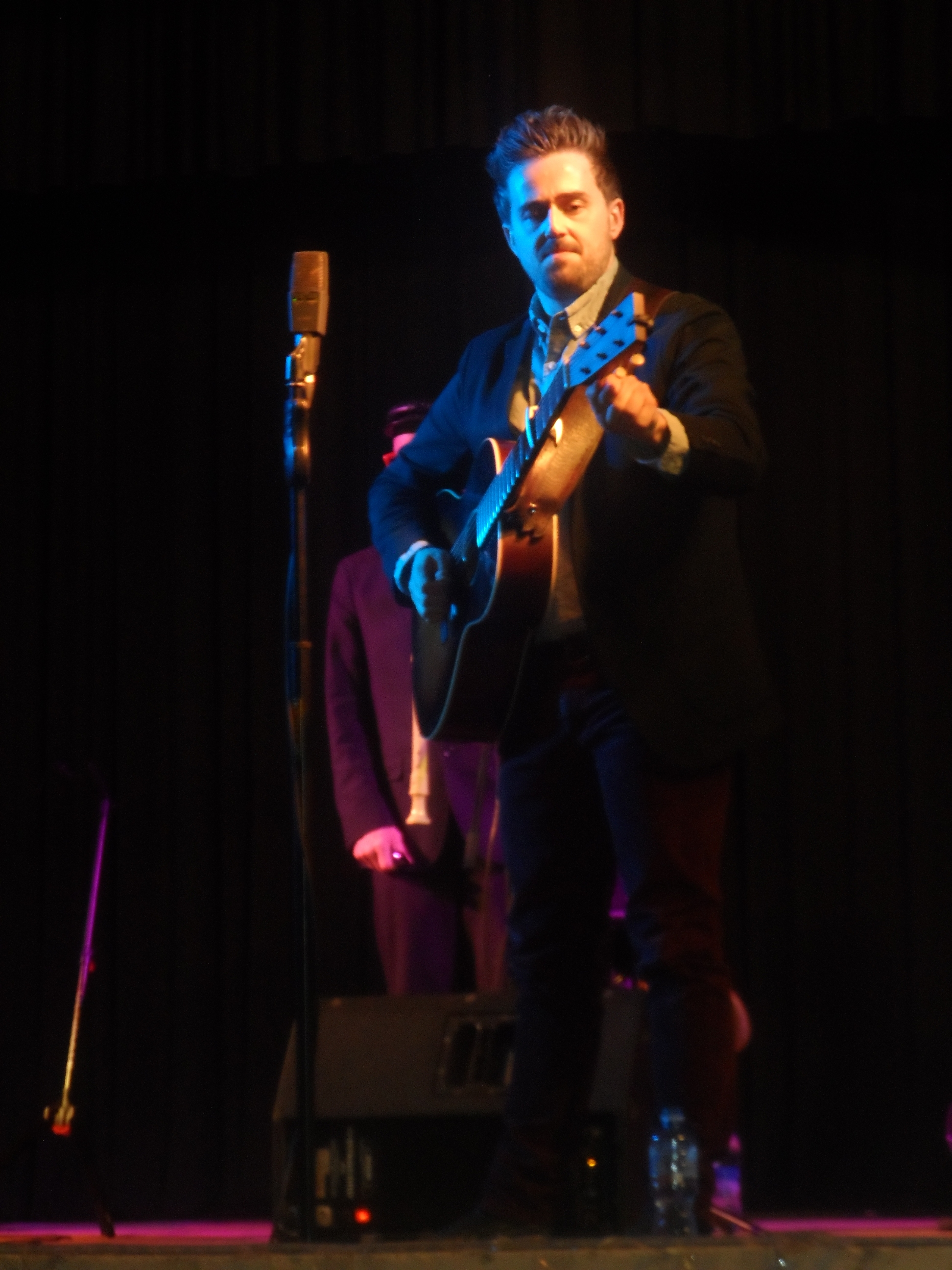

Background information
- Born: November 16, 1988 (age 37); Shelburne Falls, MA, US
- Genres: Folk, pop
- Occupation: Singer-songwriter
- Instruments: Vocals, piano, guitar
- Label: MPress Records
- Website: www.sethglier.com

Seth Glier (/ˈɡlɪər/) is an American singer-songwriter, pianist, guitarist, and activist.

== Career ==
Seth Glier was born in Shelburne Falls, MA. and subsequently studied at Pioneer Valley Performing Arts Charter School PVPA in South Hadley, Massachusetts. He attended Berklee College of Music for a year before dropping out to be able to tour full-time. Since then, he has shared stages with artists such as James Taylor, Mark Knopfler, The Verve Pipe, Edwin McCain and Ani DiFranco. He has appeared as a mainstage artist at the Falcon Ridge Folk Festival (NY) and the Kerrville Folk Festival (TX). USA Today compared Seth to Bruce Springsteen and Billy Joel. He is also currently the musical director for Sophie B. Hawkins.

In 2015, Glier released his fourth album, If I Could Change One Thing, on MPress Records. The album was considered a successful move into mainstream pop, a departure from his previous, more acoustic albums. A music video for the title track, a duet with American Idol alum Crystal Bowersox, premiered on Billboard.com.

In 2016, Glier gave a TEDx talk sharing his insight on the challenges and gifts of care giving for a family member, and how it influences his life, art and music.

Glier's 2021 album The Coronation combines elements of folk, pop, and electronica and explores themes of growth, forgiveness, and envisioning a better world.

== Awards ==
Glier's 2011 album, The Next Right Thing, for which he recorded his own vocals in his parents’ basement, was nominated for a Grammy Award in the category of "Best Engineered Album, Non-Classical."

In 2011, he took home Best Love Song for his track "Naia" at the 10th Annual Independent Music Awards. In 2012, "Next Right Thing" won Best Social Action Song at the Independent Music Awards.

== Causes ==
Glier has been an outspoken advocate for autism awareness. His song "Love Is A Language" was inspired by his nonverbal autistic brother.

In 2018, Glier toured in Mongolia, China, and Ukraine as part of the American Music Abroad program, an initiative of the U.S. Department of State's Bureau of Educational and Cultural Affairs. A 2020 tour of Mexico planned with the American Music Abroad program was canceled due to COVID-19.

== Discography ==
- The Trouble With People (2009)
- The Next Right Thing (2011)
- Things I Should Let You Know (2013)
- If I Could Change One Thing (2015)
- Birds (2017)
- The Coronation (2021)
