= The Smith House (Montgomery, New York) =

Historic house in New York, United States

- U.S. National Register of Historic Places
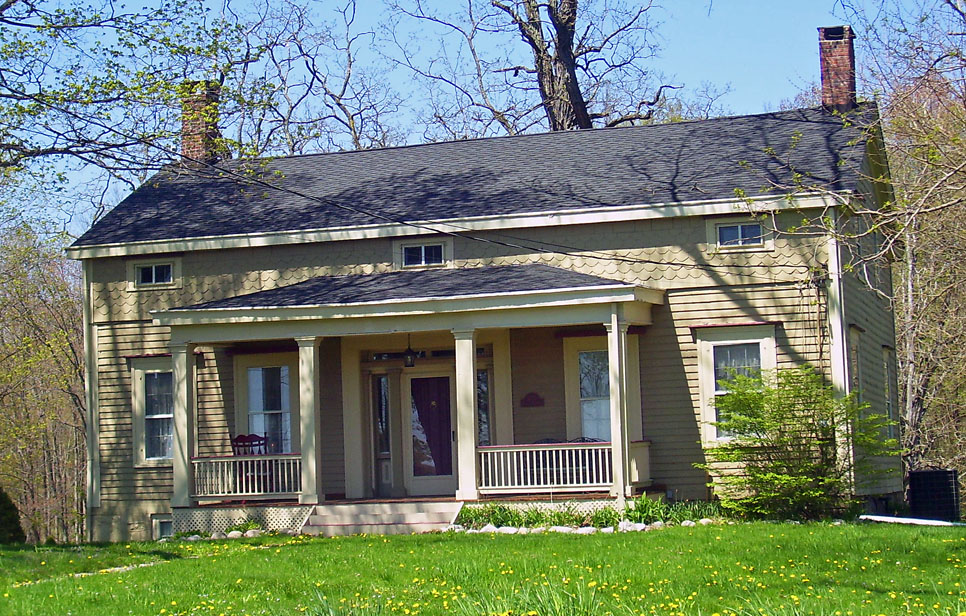
- The house in 2007

- Location within New York Location within the United States
- Location: 2727 Albany Post Rd., Town of Montgomery, NY
- Nearest city: Newburgh
- Coordinates: 41°33′09″N 74°14′13″W
- Area: 1.4 acres (0.57 ha)
- Built: 1850
- Architectural style: Greek Revival
- NRHP reference No.: 96000863
- Added to NRHP: August 8, 1996

The Smith House is a historic home located on Albany Post Road in Town of Montgomery, Orange County, New York, approximately two miles north of NY 17K and a mile southwest of Walden. In 1759 one of the town's original settlers, Wilhelm Schmitt (later Anglicized to Smith) built a stone house on the site. His descendants replaced it in 1850 with a Greek Revival-styled house that incorporates some of the original fabric.

It was added to the National Register of Historic Places in 1996.
