= Danielle Howle =

American singer-songwriter

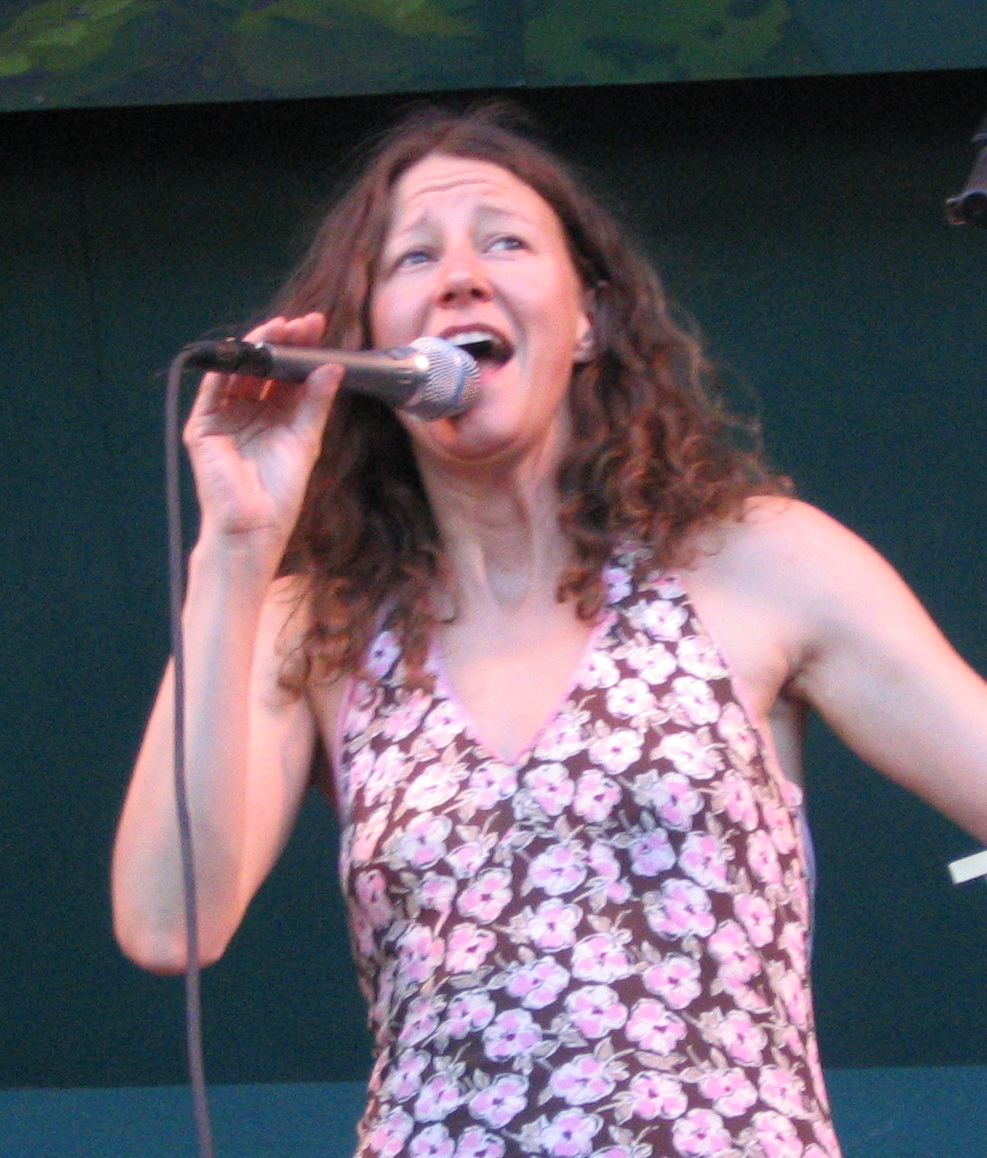

Danielle Howle (born in Columbia, South Carolina) is an American singer-songwriter and music producer.

== Biography ==
After releasing an early song on a Columbia, South Carolina, music sampler in the late 1980s, Howle joined the Columbia-based band Lay Quiet Awhile, formed by brothers Dan and Phil Cook in 1989. Howle was the voice on their first full-length album, Delicate Wire, released in 1993.

When Lay Quiet Awhile disbanded, Howle embarked on a solo career, beginning with a live album recorded at the University of South Carolina's McKissick Museum. Live at McKissick Museum was the beginning of a busy period of songwriting and touring. Howle released two solo albums, About to Burst (1996) and Catalog (1999).

About to Burst was released by Simple Machines Records, an independent pop label in Arlington, Virginia. The first single was a 7" called "Frog". The album featured solo, acoustic tracks written by Howle, and several tracks with her new backing band, the Tantrums, featuring John Furr on guitar and Bryan Williams on bass, and former Lay Quiet Awhile drummer Troy Tague.

In 1999, the band took part of the year off, so Howle continued her solo projects with the release of Catalog. This album was released on the Olympia, Washington indie label Kill Rock Stars. Catalog was ranked No. 20 of the 200 best albums of 1999 by the College Music Journal and features 12 all-acoustic songs.

Live at McKissick Museum, About to Burst, Catalog and Lay Quiet Awhile's Delicate Wire were all distributed in Europe by Southern Records in 1999.

Danielle Howle and the Tantrums released two full-length albums, Do a Two Sable in 1997, and Skorborealis in 2002. They also released several singles on local and national compilation albums.

In late 2004, Howle began pre-production on a solo record with Mark Bryan of Hootie and the Blowfish. The album took several months to complete, but in February 2005, Howle and Bryan embarked on a journey to Nashville to mix and master the album with engineer and producer Nick Brophy.

The track "Jesus Won’t Wait" was cut live in studio with bass player Byron House from Sam Bush's band.

In April 2006, Thank You, Mark was released by Valley Entertainment, a small label out of New York City. Tours with the Avett Brothers, Indigo Girls and Hootie and the Blowfish followed its release.

Howle lives at Awendaw Green, which is also a music venue and recording studio complex. Howle has been artist in residence at Awendaw Green since its founding. She created an ongoing recording project there called Swamp Sessions. All Swamp Sessions recordings are made in the solar powered Swamp House studio. Howle's 2008 album Swamp Sessions was the first recording produced in the Swamp House. Located in the Francis Marion National Forest, the facility is the only solar powered recording and events space in a national forest in the world. Artists including Cary Ann Hearst, Edwin McCain, and Mark Bryan have recorded there.

In 2017, Howle planned to go through shaman training.

== Discography ==
=== Lay Quiet Awhile ===
- The Other Eggs Are Waking Up (EP)
- Delicate Wire (1993)

=== Danielle Howle ===
- Live at McKissick Museum (Mill Records 1995, Daemon Records 1996)
- About to Burst (Simple Machines, 1996)
- Catalog (Kill Rock Stars, 1999)
- Thank You, Mark (Valley Entertainment, 2005)
- Swamp Sessions (2008)
- New Year Revolutions – with Firework Show (2011)
- The Triangle Album – tracks recorded live 2003–2006 (2011)
- Pot Of Water (EP) (2016)
- Live From The Home Team (2017)
- Current (Kill Rock Stars, 2023)
- "Sitting on my Big Front Porch" – on Columbia, SC artists sampler
- "The Wrestling Song" b/w "The Frog Song" & "Back of Your Mind" (single, Simple Machines, 1994)
- "Tomorrow Is a Long Time" (on A Tribute to Bob Dylan, Vol. 2, Sister Ruby, 1995)
- "Hi School Dance" b/w "A Word From Our Sponsor" (single, Sub Pop, 1997)
- "Cook You Good Food" – featured on 45 rpm sampler (Edisto Records)
- "In Your House" – Turbo's Tunes (Kill Rock Stars Retrospective Sampler, KRS319) (2001)

=== Danielle Howle and the Tantrums ===
- Do a Two Sable (Daemon Records, 1997)
- Skorborealis (Daemon Records, 2002)
- "Blue Halo" – featured on Carolina Productions Compilation (1996), credited to "The Tantrums"
- "Host for the Notes" on Coming of Age in Babylon, (Shut Eye book/compilation, 1999)
- "I'm in It" – on The Manifest Colossal Music Crawl (2000), a compilation of local Columbia, SC music
- "I Don't Know Where I'm Going" – Fields and Streams (Kill Rock Stars Compilation) (2002)
- "Hey You" – Handpicked Volume 1 (Handpicked Records Compilation) (2002)
