= Montgomery, New York =

Town in Orange County, New York, US

- Town
- Town of Montgomery
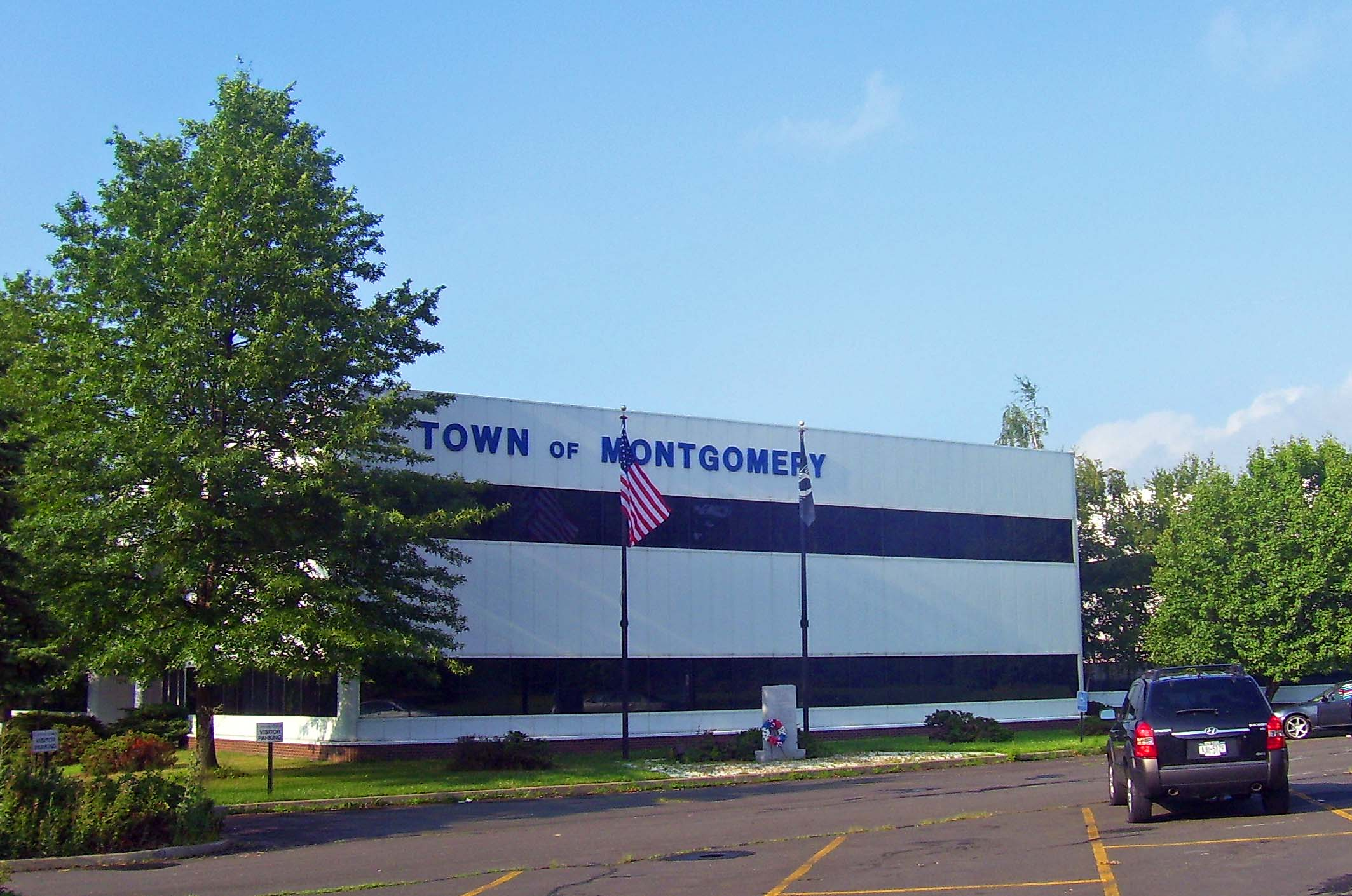
- Town Hall, on Bracken Road
- Etymology: For Richard Montgomery
- Nickname: Transportation Hub of the Northeast
- Location in Orange County and the state of New York.

- Location of New York in the United States
- Coordinates: 41°31′32″N 74°12′03″W
- Country: United States
- State: New York
- County: Orange
- Founded: 1772

Government
  - Type: Town Hall
  - Supervisor: Ron Feller (R)

Area
  - Total: 51.19 sq mi (132.58 km^{2})
  - Land: 50.26 sq mi (130.16 km^{2})
  - Water: 0.93 sq mi (2.42 km^{2})
- Elevation: 410 ft (120 m)
- Highest elevation (USGS BM Garrison, Kings Hill): 820 ft (250 m)
- Lowest elevation (Wallkill River at northern town line): 240 ft (73 m)

Population (2020)
  - Total: 23,322
  - Density: 464.07/sq mi (179.18/km^{2})
- Time zone: UTC-5 (EST)
  - Summer (DST): UTC-4 (EDT)
- ZIP Codes: 12543, 12549, 12550, 12561, 12586, 12589
- Area code: 845
- FIPS code: 36-071-48153
- Wikimedia Commons: Town of Montgomery, New York
- Website: www.townofmontgomery.com

Montgomery is a town in Orange County, New York, United States. Located roughly 60 miles (97 km) northwest of New York City, the town of Montgomery is a historical and cultural hub of the Hudson Valley region and has been a steadily growing outer-ring commuter suburb within the New York metropolitan area. As of the 2020 census, the population was listed as 23,322.

The town was named in the honor of Richard Montgomery, an American Revolutionary War general killed in 1775 at the Battle of Quebec. The northern town line is contiguous with the Ulster County border. Montgomery is immediately west of the town of Newburgh. Within its borders are three villages, one eponymous, as well as Walden and most of Maybrook.

== History ==
The early town began as a patent to Henry Wileman in 1710, who was the first settler. He was the first of a group of Palatine Germans to emigrate and settle land around what is now the village of Montgomery.

The town was originally established as Hanover in 1772, but became the town of Montgomery in 1782.

The community of Montgomery was set off by incorporation as a village in 1810, and in 1855, the community of Walden was incorporated as well. Maybrook was the last village to be incorporated, in 1926.

== Geography ==
Montgomery is bordered on the east by the town of Newburgh and on the north by the town of Shawangunk in Ulster County. The town of Crawford is to the west. The towns of Wallkill, Hamptonburgh and New Windsor, from west to east, border on the south.

The village of Walden is located in the north central portion of town. Montgomery is close to the center, and Maybrook is in the southeast corner. There are few significant year-round settlements outside of the villages; there is a summer colony around Lake Osiris in the northern section of town. Some inhabitants of Lake Osiris have made it their permanent residence. Fox Hill Bruderhof is located on the southern edge of Walden and has about 250 residents who work in their furniture factory and the Plough Publishing House.

The town's topography is generally level and low, except along parts of its eastern and western boundaries, reflecting the passage of the Wallkill River through it from north to west. There are large swamps in the south portion of town, some of them draining into the Otter Kill. Further north, the land becomes drier and more arable. It is mostly farmed, used for small residential subdivisions or left as undeveloped open space. There are a few exceptions: the business parks along Bracken, Neelytown and Stone Castle roads and NY 208, several of the Valley Central schools, the large Shop Rite plaza on Goodwill Road and Orange County Airport.

Two areas along the river have been set aside as parks. The county's Winding Hills Park is partially within Montgomery, as are portions of two larger state-level protected areas: Highland Lakes State Park and Stewart State Forest. The Thomas Bull Memorial Park, which expands over 719 acres and is the second largest developed park in Orange County, is named after a sympathizer to the British during the American Revolution.

The Wallkill River is the town's major watercourse, flowing through it from south to north past both the villages Montgomery and Walden, also partially serving as its border with Hamptonburgh. Two of its tributaries flow through Montgomery as well. The Muddy Kill, located entirely within the town, drains the area below the Comfort Hills in west central Montgomery. Tin Brook, the Wallkill's only major eastern tributary, rises just southeast of the town and flows north, then west, through Walden to drain into the river just north of the village.

According to the United States Census Bureau, the town has a total area of 51.1 square miles (132.3 km^{2}), of which, 50.4 square miles (130.6 km^{2}) of it is land and 0.6 square miles (1.7 km^{2}) of it (1.25%) is water. The highest point in the town is the U.S. Geological Survey's Garrison benchmark at a corner of the Ulster County line on Kings Hill, at 820 feet (250 m) above sea level; this is also the highest point in the neighboring Town of Newburgh as well. The lowest elevation is 240 feet (73 m), where the Wallkill River flows across the northern town and county line.

=== Climate ===
Climate data for Montgomery, New York (Orange County Airport), (1991–2020 normals, extremes 1998–present)
Month	Jan	Feb	Mar	Apr	May	Jun	Jul	Aug	Sep	Oct	Nov	Dec	Year
Record high °F (°C)	69 (21)	76 (24)	87 (31)	93 (34)	94 (34)	97 (36)	100 (38)	98 (37)	96 (36)	89 (32)	77 (25)	75 (24)	100 (38)
Mean maximum °F (°C)	58.1 (14.5)	57.7 (14.3)	67.5 (19.7)	82.6 (28.1)	88.9 (31.6)	92.1 (33.4)	94.5 (34.7)	91.2 (32.9)	89.3 (31.8)	81.1 (27.3)	69.3 (20.7)	61.7 (16.5)	95.3 (35.2)
Mean daily maximum °F (°C)	35.4 (1.9)	38.7 (3.7)	47.9 (8.8)	60.7 (15.9)	71.3 (21.8)	79.5 (26.4)	84.4 (29.1)	82.6 (28.1)	75.7 (24.3)	63.4 (17.4)	51.9 (11.1)	40.5 (4.7)	60.6 (15.9)
Daily mean °F (°C)	26.3 (−3.2)	28.8 (−1.8)	37.4 (3.0)	48.6 (9.2)	59.2 (15.1)	67.7 (19.8)	72.7 (22.6)	71.1 (21.7)	63.6 (17.6)	52.2 (11.2)	41.4 (5.2)	32.0 (0.0)	49.7 (9.8)
Mean daily minimum °F (°C)	17.3 (−8.2)	18.8 (−7.3)	26.9 (−2.8)	36.5 (2.5)	47.0 (8.3)	56.0 (13.3)	61.0 (16.1)	59.7 (15.4)	51.5 (10.8)	41.1 (5.1)	30.8 (−0.7)	23.5 (−4.7)	38.8 (3.8)
Mean minimum °F (°C)	−1.4 (−18.6)	−0.3 (−17.9)	10.7 (−11.8)	22.9 (−5.1)	32.5 (0.3)	42.9 (6.1)	51.0 (10.6)	48.5 (9.2)	37.5 (3.1)	26.3 (−3.2)	17.4 (−8.1)	8.0 (−13.3)	−4.6 (−20.3)
Record low °F (°C)	−17 (−27)	−13 (−25)	−9 (−23)	18 (−8)	26 (−3)	33 (1)	41 (5)	44 (7)	29 (−2)	21 (−6)	7 (−14)	−9 (−23)	−17 (−27)
Average precipitation inches (mm)	2.44 (62)	2.44 (62)	3.25 (83)	3.50 (89)	3.35 (85)	4.33 (110)	3.30 (84)	4.40 (112)	3.89 (99)	3.68 (93)	3.04 (77)	3.37 (86)	40.99 (1,042)
Average precipitation days (≥ 0.01 in)	10.3	10.3	11.2	11.9	14.1	13.6	12.6	14.3	13.6	12.2	9.9	11.0	145.0
Source 1: NOAA
Source 2: National Weather Service (mean maxima/minima 2006–2020)

== Transportation ==
Montgomery is referred to as the "transportation hub of the northeast" from the days prior to the 1940s. The Erie Railroad (later part of Erie Lackawanna) had the Goshen-Montgomery branch that went from Montgomery southward to Campbell Hall, Campbell Hall Junction, to the Erie Railroad's main line at Goshen. The Wallkill Valley Railroad (later absorbed into the New York Central) ran north from Montgomery, to New Paltz, to Kingston, connecting there to the New York Central's West Shore Railroad. Both railroads discontinued passenger operations on those lines by 1938. As of the late 20th century the rail lines have been reduced to freight spurs and rail trails, and roads have taken over that role.

Orange County Airport, a small airport located in Montgomery, opened in 1943.

== Demographics ==
Historical population
Census	Pop.	Note	%±
1790	3,563		—
1820	5,541		—
1830	3,887		−29.9%
1840	4,100		5.5%
1850	3,933		−4.1%
1860	3,973		1.0%
1870	4,536		14.2%
1880	4,795		5.7%
1890	5,061		5.5%
1900	5,939		17.3%
1910	7,439		25.3%
1920	8,351		12.3%
1930	8,082		−3.2%
1940	8,418		4.2%
1950	9,868		17.2%
1960	11,672		18.3%
1970	13,995		19.9%
1980	16,576		18.4%
1990	18,501		11.6%
2000	20,891		12.9%
2010	22,606		8.2%
2020	23,332		3.2%
U.S. Decennial Census

As of the census of 2000, there were 20,891 people, 7,273 households, and 5,447 families residing in the town. The population density was 414.2 inhabitants per square mile (159.9/km^{2}). There were 7,643 housing units at an average density of 151.5 per square mile (58.5/km^{2}). The racial makeup of the town was 91.28% white, 3.69% black or African American, .25% Native American, .68% Asian, .01% Pacific Islander, 2.35% from other races, and 1.73% from two or more races. Hispanic or Latino of any race were 7.75% of the population.

There were 7,273 households, out of which 40.4% had children under the age of 18 living with them, 58.3% were married couples living together, 11.6% had a female householder with no spouse present, and 25.1% were non-families. 20.0% of all households were made up of individuals, and 8.2% had someone living alone who was 65 years of age or older. The average household size was 2.84 and the average family size was 3.28.

In the town, the population was spread out, with 29.3% under the age of 18, 7.2% from 18 to 24, 31.1% from 25 to 44, 21.9% from 45 to 64, and 10.5% who were 65 years of age or older. The median age was 35 years. For every 100 females, there were 95.8 males. For every 100 females age 18 and over, there were 92.6 males.

The median income for a household in the town was $49,422, and the median income for a family was $56,376. Males had a median income of $40,881 versus $29,163 for females. The per capita income for the town was $20,222. About 4.6% of families and 7.7% of the population were below the poverty line, including 9.2% of those under age 18 and 10.3% of those age 65 or over.

== Government ==
As in all New York towns, Montgomery is governed by a five-member town council, which in this case consists of the full-time town supervisor, in whom executive and financial power is vested, and four council members. The town clerk, highway superintendent, and receiver of taxes are also elected. All officials serve four-year terms except the supervisor, who is elected every two years.

Representation in the state legislature is split between Republicans and Democrats in the town of Montgomery. It is at the southern end of the 101st Assembly district, currently represented by Brian Miller (Democratic). State Senator James Skoufis (Republican) represents the town as part of the 39th district.

Montgomery residents live in U.S. House districts held by Democrats. It is part of the state's 18th congressional district, represented by Sean Patrick Maloney, and was previously one of three towns in the county to be part of what was then the 22nd district, represented by Maurice Hinchey. Senators Charles Schumer and Kirsten Gillibrand represent the town and all of New York in the U.S. Senate.

Montgomery Town Council
Seat	Member	Party	Took office
Supervisor	Ron Feller	Republican	January 1, 2023
Councilmember (at-large)	Kristen Brown	Democratic	January 1, 2020
Councilmember (at-large)	Cindy Voss	Republican	January 1, 2023
Councilmember (at-large)	Sherry Melick	Republican	January 1, 2006
Councilmember (at-large)	Mike Setteducado	Republican	January 1, 2022

== Communities and locations ==
- Allards (formerly "Allards Corners") – A hamlet near the northern town line.
- Berea – a hamlet east of Montgomery village along NY 17K, west of Coldenham.
- Coldenham – a hamlet east of Montgomery village along NY 17K.
- Maybrook – village is partially composed of the southern part of the town on NY 208.
- Montgomery – this village is located near the center of the town at the intersection of NY 17K and NY 211.
- Morrison Heights – a hamlet north of Maybrook by interstate 84, along 208 into Montgomery.
- Scotts Corner – a hamlet two miles east of Montgomery village, located at the intersection of NY 17K and NY 208.
- Walden – this village is in the northern part of the town, by the Wallkill River and NY 208.

== Notable people ==
- Levi S. Backus, first deaf editor of an American newspaper
- David Bernsley (born 1969), American-Israeli basketball player
- Andrew H. Embler, Medal of Honor recipient and officer in the Union Army during the American Civil War
- Nathaniel P. Hill, US Senator from Colorado (1879–1885)
- P. J. Jacobsen, motorcycle racer
- Dom Kelly, activist, founder of New Disabled South, and member of rock band A Fragile Tomorrow
- John D. Lawson, US Congressman from New York's 8th District (1873–1875)
- Thomas P. Maguire, Adjutant General of New York, resident of Walden
- John L. Senior, sports administrator at Cornell University and founder of Slope Day
- Wesley Wait, inventor, author, and dental surgeon
- A Fragile Tomorrow, indie rock band

== See also ==
- List of towns in New York
