= Will Rigby =

American musician (born 1956)

- Born: March 17, 1956 (age 70)
- Genres: Jangle pop, guitar pop
- Instrument: Drums
- Years active: 1970s-present
- Labels: Bearsville Records, IRS Records, Egon Records, Diesel Only Records
- Member of: the dB's

Will Rigby (born March 17, 1956) is an American musician known for being the drummer of jangle pop band the dB's, a band he formed along with Peter Holsapple, Chris Stamey, and Gene Holder in the late 1970s. He has also performed with many other artists and has released two solo albums.

== Career in the dB's ==
Rigby was a member of the dB's from the band's inception. He performed on several of the dB's albums, including Stands for Decibels, Like This, and The Sound of Music. When the band reunited in 2012, Rigby wrote and performed lead vocals on the song "Write Back," which appeared on Falling Off the Sky. This song was the first song Rigby contributed to a dB's album.

== Career outside of the dB's ==
In addition to his work with the dB's, Rigby has also performed with numerous other artists, including Steve Earle, Cheri Knight, and Freedy Johnston. He also toured with Murray Attaway and Matthew Sweet after the dB's broke up, and also performed with the Shams on their album Quilt.

=== Solo career ===
Rigby's solo debut, Sidekick Phenomenon, was released in 1985, followed by Paradoxaholic in 2002. Sidekick Phenomenon was recorded in the dB's rehearsal studio after hours, and contains covers of Merle Haggard and Hank Williams songs as well as originals. Paradoxaholic was more planned out than its predecessor, and was described by Andrew Marcus as "a beat-heavy, quirky guitar pop album." Rigby also released several singles during the early 1990s, including "The Room's Still Spinnin'", released on Bob Mould's Singles Only Label, and "Ricky Skaggs Tonight", released on Diesel Only Records in 1990.

== Style ==
Rigby has been described as "a rare rock drummer with a sound of his own beyond mere beat-keeping." In 2002, Rigby reacted to this quote by saying, "If that’s true, I’m glad", arguing it applied more to his work with the dB's than to his solo work.

== Personal life ==
Rigby was married to singer-songwriter Amy Rigby; the two later divorced. Rigby has been married to Florence Dore, musician and author, since 2004. He has two daughters: one with Amy Rigby and one with Dore.

== Discography ==
- Sidekick Phenomenon (1985, Egon Records)
- Paradoxaholic (2002, Diesel Only Records)
