= Repercussion (album) =

Studio album by The dB's
- Released: 1981
- Recorded: 1981
- Studios: Power Station, New York and Ramport Studios, London; mixed at George Martin's Air Studios
- Genres: Power pop; alternative rock
- Length: 38:44
- Labels: Albion (original release); I.R.S. (1989 CD reissue)
- Producer: Scott Litt

The dB's chronology
Stands for Decibels (1981)	Repercussion (1981)	Like This (1984)

Repercussion is the second studio album by American power pop band the dB's, released in 1981 by Albion Records. Like its predecessor, Stands for Decibels, the album was commercially unsuccessful but critically acclaimed.

The album, Albion Records LP #109, is variously reported as being released in 1981 or 1982. It was reviewed by Billboard on December 26, 1981, although reviewers sometimes received copies in advance of release. AllMusic and Spotify list a 1982 release. Bandcamp's 2024 remaster release says 1981, as does the dB's own website.

Shortly after the album's release, Chris Stamey left the group to pursue a solo career in early April 1982, making Repercussion the last album with the original lineup until they reunited and released Falling Off the Sky 30 years later.

== Background and production ==
Stamey and Peter Holsapple, the band's dual singers/guitarists, each ended up contributing six songs on the album. As was the case on their debut, Stamey's songs veered towards more experimental melodies and rhythms, while Holsapple's songs were more traditionally in a pop vein.

The album was produced by Scott Litt (later famous for his association with the band R.E.M. and for remixing Nirvana's album In Utero), giving it a "fuller, more modern overall sound".

The first track, Holsapple's "Living a Lie", featured a horn section, the Rumour Brass.

Stamey's "ridiculously catchy" song "Ask for Jill" was about the process of mastering an album.

Holsapple's composition "Amplifier" (about a suicidal man reflecting on how his significant other left him and took all his belongings, save for the titular object) became the band's lead single and also their first video. "Amplifier" was later rerecorded and included on the band's next album, Like This. The original version was later included on Rhino Records' box set Left of the Dial: Dispatches from the '80s Underground.

A video for the second single, "Neverland", was completed but went unreleased until the band uploaded it to their website in 2008.

== Reception ==
Professional ratings
Review scores
Source	Rating
AllMusic	4.5/5 stars
Robert Christgau	B+
The Rolling Stone Album Guide	3.5/5 stars

Robert Palmer of The New York Times praised Repercussion, arguing that it proves "the excellence of the group's first album was no fluke" and that Repercussion was "a more consistent, more mature piece of work" than its predecessor. He then hailed the band as "one of the most resourceful and inventive pop-rock bands making records and performing," writing that "the dB's are out to prove that pop songs can carry as much emotional freight as hard rock or blues-based numbers, and they prove it brilliantly."

Pitchfork's retrospective review upon the 2002 Stands for Decibels/Repercussion two-for-one reissue calls Repercussion a "cleaner-sounding, more mature" album that "suggests a developing band and a terrific songwriting partnership." The review rates the package 9.0 and discusses the band's "bad breaks" in failing to reach wider commercial success.

== Track listing ==
Side 1

1. "Living a Lie" – 3:26 (Peter Holsapple)
2. "We Were Happy There" – 2:39 (Holsapple)
3. "Happenstance" – 4:07 (Chris Stamey)
4. "From a Window" – 2:34 (Stamey)
5. "Amplifier" – 3:08 (Holsapple)
6. "Ask for Jill" – 2:33 (Stamey)

Side 2

7. "I Feel Good (Today)" – 4:28 (Stamey)
8. "Storm Warning" – 2:32 (Holsapple)
9. "Ups and Downs" – 3:03 (Stamey)
10. "Nothing Is Wrong" – 4:16 (Holsapple)
11. "In Spain" – 3:02 (Stamey)
12. "Neverland" – 2:46 (Holsapple)

Different versions of the album have been reissued on CD with different bonus tracks, usually either Holsapple's instrumental B-side "PH Factor" or Stamey's "Soul Kiss".

== Personnel ==
Personnel taken from the 1989 reissue liner notes.

The dB's

- Chris Stamey – guitar, vocals; piano on "Living a Lie"
- Peter Holsapple – guitar, vocals, organ; tubular bells on "Ask for Jill", slide guitar on "In Spain"
- Gene Holder – bass guitar
- Will Rigby – drums; WASP synthesizer on "We Were Happy There" and "In Spain"

Additional musicians

- Andy Clark – additional keyboards
- The Rumour Brass:
  - Chris Gower – trombone
  - Dick Hansen – trumpet
  - John "Irish" Earle – saxophones
