= Stands for Decibels =

Studio album by The dB's
- Released: January 15, 1981
- Recorded: 1980
- Studios: Blue Rock Studio, SoHo, Manhattan
- Genres: Power pop; jangle pop; college rock
- Length: 34:36
- Label: Albion
- Producers: Alan Betrock; The dB's

The dB's chronology
Stands for Decibels (1981)	Repercussion (1981)

Stands for Decibels is the debut studio album by American power pop band the dB's, released January 15, 1981 by Albion Records. The album was commercially unsuccessful but critically acclaimed.

At the time of its release, the dB's consisted of singer/guitarists Chris Stamey and Peter Holsapple, bassist Gene Holder, and drummer Will Rigby. The songwriting was evenly divided between Stamey and Holsapple, although Stamey became known for writing the stranger, more avant-garde numbers ("She's Not Worried", "Espionage"), while Holsapple wrote the more accessible, poppier songs ("Black and White", "Bad Reputation"). Both Stamey and Holsapple played keyboards occasionally as well. Holder and Rigby did not receive any songwriting credits (other than a group credit for "Dynamite").

The album, which was recorded at Blue Rock Studio in SoHo, Manhattan, was dedicated to George Scott III. "Black and White" was released as the band's first single. I.R.S. Records reissued the album on CD in 1989.

== Reception ==
Professional ratings
Review scores
Source	Rating
AllMusic	4.5/5 stars
Pitchfork	9.0/10
The Rolling Stone Album Guide	4/5 stars
Smash Hits	8/10
Spin Alternative Record Guide	9/10
Tom Hull – on the Web	B+
The Village Voice	A−

Robert Palmer of The New York Times hailed Stands for Decibels as one of the year's ten best albums, observing in an earlier review that Holsapple and Stamey's songs "affectionately recall specific influences, from the early Beatles to Big Star, but remain stubbornly individual. Mr. Holsapple tends to wear his heart on his sleeve; he writes the group's most lyrical melodies, but he pens its toughest lyrics, too. Mr. Stamey is more oblique; his songs are compendiums of astringent harmonies, out of kilter rhythms, unexpected breaks and modulations, and pure pop romanticism. Both writers are well-served by an urgently kinetic rhythm section, Gene Holder on bass and Will Rigby on drums." He'd later praise the dB's for making "the most impressive pop-rock debut since the emergence of Elvis Costello five years ago. They are breathing new life into rock by reinventing the tension between structural limitations and experimentation that made the music of the mid-'60s so special."

In The Village Voice's year-end Pazz & Jop poll, Stands for Decibels was voted by critics as the 26th best album of 1981.

In a retrospective review for AllMusic, Chris Woodstra stated: "On their debut, the dB's combined a reverence for British pop and arty, post-punk leanings that alternate between minimalism and a love of quirky embellishment, odd sounds, and unexpected twists; Stands for Decibels is clearly a collegiate pop experiment, but rarely is experimentation so enjoyable and irresistibly catchy." He concluded that the album "stands not only as a landmark power pop album, but also as a prototype for much of the Southern jangle that would follow." Stands for Decibels was ranked at number 76 on Pitchfork's list of the 100 best albums of the 1980s.

== Track listing ==
Side one

1. "Black and White" (Peter Holsapple) – 3:09
2. "Dynamite" (Gene Holder, Holsapple, Will Rigby, Chris Stamey) – 2:35
3. "She's Not Worried" (Stamey) – 3:04
4. "The Fight" (Holsapple) – 2:54
5. "Espionage" (Stamey) – 2:39
6. "Tearjerkin'" (Stamey) – 3:56

Side two

1. "Cycles per Second" (Stamey) – 3:06
2. "Bad Reputation" (Holsapple) – 3:11
3. "Big Brown Eyes" (Holsapple) – 1:58
4. "I'm in Love" (Stamey) – 3:29
5. "Moving in Your Sleep" (Holsapple) – 4:35

Some later CD versions (including the 1992 compilation dB's First/Repercussion) add two bonus tracks: "Baby Talk" (writer: Stamey, length: 1:50) as track 7, and "Judy" (writer: Holsapple, length: 2:48) as track 13.

== Personnel ==
Credits are adapted from the 1989 reissue liner notes.

The dB's

- Gene Holder – bass guitar; cello on "Tearjerkin'" and "Moving in Your Sleep", lead guitar on "Moving in Your Sleep"
- Peter Holsapple – guitar, vocals, organ, piano
- Will Rigby – drums, percussion; backing vocals on "Moving in Your Sleep"
- Chris Stamey – guitar, vocals; backwards piano on "She's Not Worried", harmonica on "I'm in Love", bass on "Moving in Your Sleep"

Additional musician

- Janet Wygal – handclaps on "Black and White"

Technical

- Alan Betrock – production
- Stephanie Chernikowski – photography
- The dB's – production
- Victoria DeVeraux – painting
- Malcolm Garrett – typography
