= Like This =

Like This may refer to:

- Like This (album), a 1984 album by The dB's
- "Like This" (Kelly Rowland song), 2007
- "Like This" (Mims song), 2007
- "Like This", by Brandy Norwood from Full Moon
- "Like This", by Jessica Mauboy featuring Iyaz from Get 'Em Girls
- "Like This", by Ken Carson featuring Lil Uzi Vert and Destroy Lonely from A Great Chaos
- "Like This", by Marques Houston from Veteran
- "Like This", by Meisa Kuroki
- "Like This", by Shawn Mendes from Illuminate
- "Like This", by Snoop Dogg from Tha Blue Carpet Treatment
- "Like This", by Technotronic featuring Monday Midnite
- "Like This", by Wonder Girls
- "Like This", by Pentagon from Demo 01
- "Like This", by STAYC from Star to a Young Culture
- "So Sexy Chapter II (Like This)", by Twista, 2004
