= Paradoxaholic =

Studio album by Will Rigby
- Released: April 23, 2002
- Genre: Rock music
- Length: 43:32
- Label: Diesel Only

Will Rigby chronology
Sidekick Phenomenon (1985)	Paradoxaholic (2002)

Paradoxaholic is the second solo album by Will Rigby, released on April 23, 2002 on Diesel Only Records. It is also his first solo album in 17 years, since Sidekick Phenomenon was released in 1985. Paradoxaholic was notably more planned-out than Sidekick Phenomenon was. It was recorded during Rigby's time as a session musician, during which he exchanged time doing sessions for the opportunity to record his own music in the studio.

== Title ==
Rigby coined the word "paradoxaholic" to be the album's title. In 2002, he explained to Nashville Scene what this term meant to him:

"Some of my songs are kind of funny, and some are really sad, but to me, they don’t seem to go together very well. But that’s what I do, and I was trying to think of a title that reflected that so I just made up the word ‘paradoxaholic,’ which doesn’t really get at the point, but was the closest I could come."

Professional ratings
Review scores
Source	Rating
AllMusic	4/5 stars
City Pages	(favorable)
East Bay Express	(favorable)
Nashville Scene	(favorable)
Village Voice	A–

== Track listing ==
1. Got You Up My Sleeve
2. This Song Isn't Even About You
3. The Sweeter Thing To Do
4. ...Wheelchair, Drunk
5. Leanin' On Bob
6. Get Away Get Away
7. The Jerks At Work
8. Samamaranda
9. Midas Beige
10. If I Can't Be A King
11. Flap Down
12. Sensible Shoes

== Personnel ==
- Bruce Bennett – guitars, background vocals
- Martin Bisi – engineer
- Mike Caiati – engineer
- Stephanie Chernikowski – design, photography
- Pete DeCoste – drums
- Jim DeMain – mastering
- Jim Duffy – organ
- Jon Graboff – guitars
- Gene Holder – bass, engineer
- Mickey McMahan – drawing
- Blackie Pagano – bass
- Nancy Polstein – drums
- Will Rigby – drums, keyboard bass, keyboards, ergan, producer, programming, tambourine, vocals, background vocals
- Dave Schramm – guitar
- Lianne Smith – vocals
- Mark Spencer – bass, engineer, guitar
