= Quilt (The Shams album) =

Studio album by the Shams
- Released: 1991
- Genre: Indie rock
- Label: Matador
- Producer: Lenny Kaye

The Shams chronology
Only a Dream 7" (1990)	Quilt (1991)	Sedusia EP (1993)

Quilt is an album by the American band the Shams. Released in 1991, it was the band's only album. "Only a Dream" first appeared on a single put out by Bob Mould's Singles Only Label. The Shams promoted the album by playing at CBGB during the 1992 CMJ Music Marathon.

== Production ==
The album was produced by Lenny Kaye, who was tipped to the band by Richard Hell. Most of its songs were written by Amy McMahon Rigby. All three band members were in their 30s when they recorded the album.

Robert Quine and Will Rigby (Amy's husband at the time) played guitar and drums on the album, respectively. "Time" is a cover of the Richard Hell song.

== Critical reception ==
Professional ratings
Review scores
Source	Rating
Chicago Tribune	3.5/4 stars
Robert Christgau	(choice cut)
MusicHound Rock: The Essential Album Guide	3/5 stars

Trouser Press wrote that "the beautifully constructed frustrated-love songs 'Stuck Here on the Ground' and 'Watching the Grass Grow' would be on oldies radio every eight hours if they’d only been recorded 20 years earlier." The Austin American-Statesman noted that "instrumentation is kept to a minimum, harmonies are blended to sound human rather than studio slick and songs are intended to reflect everydayness rather than rock glamour." Robert Christgau praised "Watching the Grass Grow".

Entertainment Weekly commended the "crisp production and stick-to-the-rib-cage songs," likening the album to "a drowsy summer sing-along on a city fire escape." The Washington Post called "Down at the Texaco" "a lively but hardly abrasive rocker that revives the spunky spirit of the Shangri-las' blue-collar love songs." The Chicago Tribune concluded that "it's the good to great songs, artlessly terrific singing and sparse arrangements that make Quilt a keeper." The Time Union deemed the album "positively delightful," labeling it "a cross between the Roches and the Shangri-Las."

AllMusic wrote that "there's something decidedly postmodern about the Shams' approach to music, which combines girl group '60s pop with off-kilter jangliness and a sort of country twang."

== Track listing ==
No.	Title	Length
1.	"It'll All Catch Up to You"
2.	"Stuck Here on the Ground"
3.	"Dark Angel"
4.	"Dressed to Kill"
5.	"Only a Dream"
6.	"Ice Tea"
7.	"Watching the Grass Grow"
8.	"File Clerk Blues"
9.	"Down at the Texaco"
10.	"Brown's Diner"
11.	"Time"
12.	"Always with Me"
