= Benmont Tench =

American musician (born 1953)

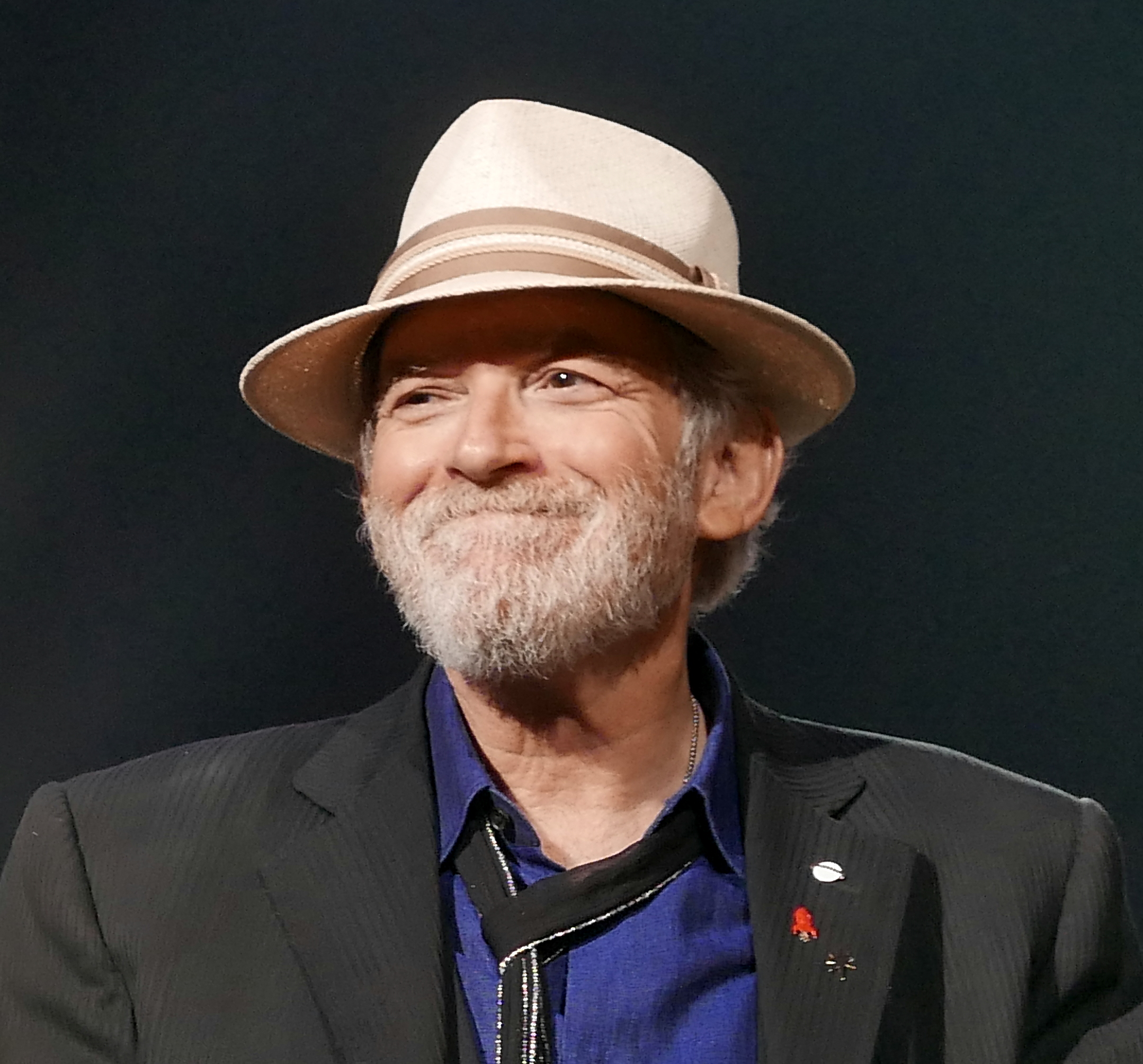
- Tench performing in 2017

Background information
- Born: Benjamin Montmorency Tench III; September 7, 1953 (age 73); Gainesville, Florida, U.S.
- Genres: Rock; country
- Instruments: Keyboards; vocals
- Years active: 1974–present
- Formerly of: Tom Petty and the Heartbreakers

Benjamin Montmorency "Benmont" Tench III (born September 7, 1953) is an American musician and singer, and a founding member of Tom Petty and the Heartbreakers.

== Early years ==
Tench was born in Gainesville, Florida, the second child of Judge Benjamin Montmorency Tench Jr. and Mary Catherine McInnis Tench. His father was born and raised in the city of Gainesville, and served as a Florida circuit court judge.

Tench played piano from an early age. His first recital was at age six. After discovering the music of the Beatles, he ended his classical piano lessons and focused on rock and roll. At age 11, he met Tom Petty for the first time at a Gainesville music store. Petty and Tench played together as members of The Sundowners in 1964. The Tench family's garage was a frequent practice site for the band.

== Education ==
Tench attended Phillips Exeter Academy, and subsequently Tulane University in New Orleans. While on a college break, Tench went to a concert by Mudcrutch, Petty's band, with an opening act from nearby Jacksonville, Lynyrd Skynyrd. Afterwards, he sat in with the band on several different sessions, then went back to school. Soon after, Petty called Tench and asked him to quit school and join Mudcrutch full-time, which after long deliberation, Tench agreed to; but before he would leave school, Petty had to convince Tench's father that his son had a promising music career.

== Music career ==
Mudcrutch eventually evolved into Tom Petty and the Heartbreakers.

In addition to playing piano and Hammond organ with the Heartbreakers, Tench is also a session musician, having recorded with dozens of notable artists.

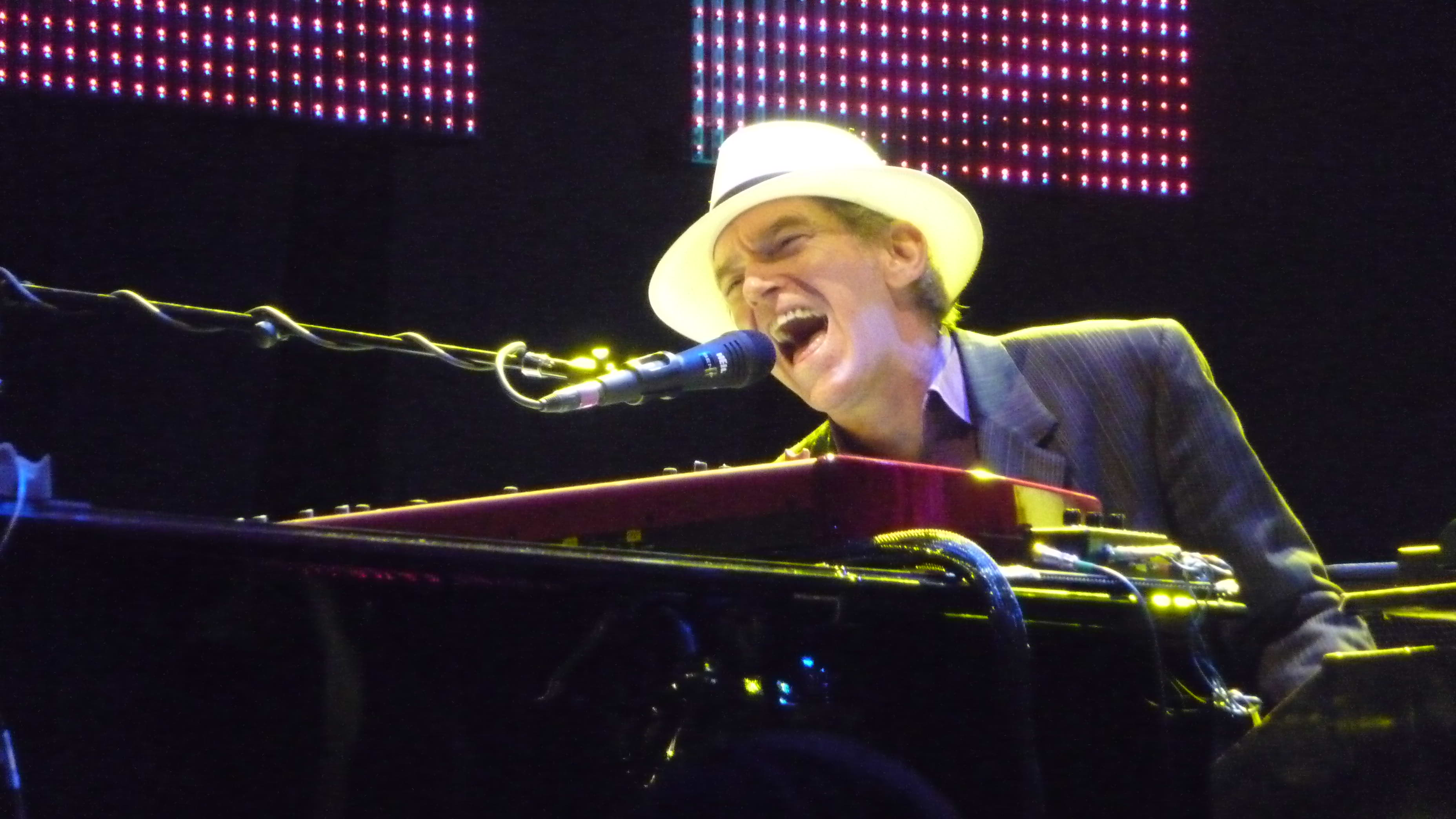
Hollywood Bowl, October 1, 2010.

Songs written by Tench and recorded by other artists include "You Little Thief", a top 5 UK and Australian hit for Feargal Sharkey in 1985, and "Never Be You" (co-written with Petty), which was featured on the Streets of Fire soundtrack album and became a #1 US Country hit for Rosanne Cash, also in 1985. Tench has received two ASCAP songwriting awards: in 1995 for "Stay Forever" (performed by Hal Ketchum) and in 2001 for "Unbreakable Heart" (performed by Jessica Andrews). This was also recorded by Carlene Carter in the early 1990s. He also wrote songs for Kimmie Rhodes ("Play Me A Memory") and Lone Justice ("Sweet, Sweet Baby (I'm Falling)").

== Other bands and solo career ==
In 2008, Tench became part of a supergroup, initially named the Scrolls, now officially known as Works Progress Administration (W.P.A.). The band is composed of Tench, Sean Watkins (guitar), Sara Watkins (fiddle), Glen Phillips (guitar, vocals), Luke Bulla (fiddle), Greg Leisz (various), Pete Thomas (drums), and Davey Faragher (bass). The group released a self-titled album in September 2009. Tench penned one of the songs on the album, named "The Price", sung by Sara Watkins and himself. A fan of the Replacements, he would join them on stage.

Tench has worked extensively with other musicians, playing keyboards on hundreds of songs on albums such as Stevie Nicks' Bella Donna, Bob Dylan's Shot of Love, along with Johnny Cash, Roy Orbison, Alanis Morissette, Eurythmics, Fiona Apple, U2, X, and he is featured on "Depending on You" on the Rolling Stones's album Hackney Diamonds, among many more.

In 2009, Tench frequently appeared with the Watkins Family Hour at Largo at the Coronet in Los Angeles. He has also appeared at the Largo and at the Fillmore in San Francisco as a special guest with Gillian Welch and David Rawlings, and accompanied the Dave Rawlings Machine on part of their west coast tour in spring 2010. In 2015, the Watkins Family Hour released their debut album and went on a national tour.

In 2014, Tench released his first solo album, titled You Should Be So Lucky. Tench also added keyboard parts to Stevie Nicks' album 24 Karat Gold: Songs from the Vault.

In 2016, Tench played the Fleetwood Mac tribute at the Fonda Theater, in Los Angeles; he performed the song "Silver Springs" with Courtney Love. Tench also appears on the bill for a tribute to the band Big Star that took place in Los Angeles, California, in April 2016 (together with members of R.E.M, Wilco and Semisonic). Tench also reunited with Mudcrutch to record the band's second album, Mudcrutch 2. The band embarked on their American tour on May 26, 2016.

In March 2019, Tench played three shows with Phil Lesh & Friends at the Capitol Theatre in Port Chester, New York. He also played on three songs from the Who's album WHO, released in December 2019.

In March 2025, Tench released his second solo studio album, entitled The Melancholy Season.

== Recognition ==
In 2024, Neil McCormick of The Daily Telegraph ranked Tench as the third greatest keyboard player of all time, calling him "the King of the Hammond in the contemporary rock era".

== Personal life ==
In 1991, Tench married Canadian model Courtney Taylor. They divorced in late 1999. In 2015, Tench married his second wife, author Alice Carbone Tench. Their daughter was born on December 16, 2017.

In 2025, Tench revealed that he had been undergoing treatment for tongue cancer since being diagnosed in 2011. After the cancer recurred, he underwent several surgeries, including a major operation in October 2023 in which half of his jaw was removed and reconstructed using bone and muscle from his leg. Subsequent treatment included the removal of additional portions of his tongue and radiation therapy. The surgeries affected his enunciation and resulted in a lisp, although Tench said that his diction improves with extended singing and practice. He subsequently returned to recording, touring and performing.

== Discography ==
=== Solo ===
Studio albums

- You Should Be So Lucky (2014)
- The Melancholy Season (2025)

Other studio appearance

- "The Mermaid Song" from More Music from The Rum Diary (2012)

Live single

- Nervous from the Fall: "Love Will Tear Us Apart"/"China Doll" (2019)

=== Session ===
- Bella Donna – Stevie Nicks (1981)
- Shot of Love – Bob Dylan (1981)
- I Can't Stand Still – Don Henley (1982)
- The Wild Heart – Stevie Nicks (1983)
- Building the Perfect Beast – Don Henley (1984)
- Lone Justice – Lone Justice (1985)
- Empire Burlesque – Bob Dylan (1985)
- Who's Zoomin' Who? – Aretha Franklin (1985)
- Rock a Little – Stevie Nicks (1985)
- Knocked Out Loaded – Bob Dylan (1986)
- The Knife Feels Like Justice – Brian Setzer (1986)
- The Sound of Music – The dB's (1987)
- Sentimental Hygiene – Warren Zevon (1987)
- Two Stories – Williams Brothers (1987)
- Lead Me On – Amy Grant (1988)
- Mystery Girl – Roy Orbison (1989)
- The Man with the Blue Post-Modern Fragmented Neo-Traditionalist Guitar – Peter Case (1989)
- Full Moon Fever – Tom Petty (1989)
- Transverse City – Warren Zevon (1989)
- Spike – Elvis Costello (1989)
- Back from Rio – Roger McGuinn (1991)
- Road Apples – The Tragically Hip (1991)
- The Missing Years – John Prine (1991)
- Night Calls – Joe Cocker (1991)
- Mighty Like A Rose – Elvis Costello (1991)
- Reckoning – Christine Lakeland (1993)
- Robin Zander – Robin Zander (1993)
- Blink of an Eye – Michael McDonald (1993)
- I'm Alive – Jackson Browne (1993)
- Rumble Doll – Patti Scialfa (1993)
- Rhythm, Country and Blues – Various Artists (1994)
- Wildflowers – Tom Petty (1994)
- Looking East – Jackson Browne (1996)
- Unchained – Johnny Cash (1996)
- Dust – Screaming Trees (1996)
- Out of My Way – Peter Holsapple (1997)
- We Ran – Linda Ronstadt (1998)
- Dizzy Up the Girl – Goo Goo Dolls (1998)
- Urban Observer - DDT (1998) ("Unsaid", "Styrofoam", "Liquid")
- Inside Job – Don Henley (2000)
- Warning – Green Day (2000)
- American III: Solitary Man – Johnny Cash (2000)
- Trouble in Shangri-La – Stevie Nicks (2001)
- Poses - Rufus Wainwright
- American IV: The Man Comes Around – Johnny Cash (2002)
- Unearthed – Johnny Cash (2003)
- Tambourine – Tift Merritt (2004)
- 12 Songs – Neil Diamond (2005)
- Taking the Long Way – Dixie Chicks (2006)
- American V: A Hundred Highways – Johnny Cash (2006)
- Coming Home – New Found Glory (2006)
- Home Before Dark – Neil Diamond (2008)
- "Christina Courtin" - Christina Courtin (2009)
- Y Not – Ringo Starr (2010)
- Dreams – Neil Diamond (2010)
- Ringo 2012 – Ringo Starr (2012)
- 24 Karat Gold: Songs from the Vault – Stevie Nicks (2014)
- Postcards From Paradise – Ringo Starr (2015)
- Give More Love – Ringo Starr (2017)
- What's My Name – Ringo Starr (2019)
- Who – The Who (2019)
- Starting Over – Chris Stapleton (2020)
- Zoom In – Ringo Starr (2021)
- Hackney Diamonds – The Rolling Stones (2023)
- Foreign Tongues – The Rolling Stones (2026)
