= Holsapple =

Holsapple can refer to:

- Peter Holsapple (born 1956), an American musician
- 20360 Holsapple, a minor planet
