= Diary of a Mod Housewife =

Studio album by Amy Rigby
- Released: 1996
- Genre: Rock
- Label: Koch
- Producers: Elliot Easton, Gene Holder

Amy Rigby chronology
Diary of a Mod Housewife (1996)	Middlescence (1998)

Diary of a Mod Housewife is the debut album by the American musician Amy Rigby, released in 1996. It has been called a concept album about growing older in a music scene, marriage, motherhood, and romantic dissolution. Rigby supported the album with a North American tour.

== Production ==
The album was produced by the Cars guitarist Elliot Easton, with the dB member Gene Holder. Rigby duets with John Wesley Harding on the album's third track, "Beer & Kisses". Ira Kaplan contributed organ to "That Tone of Voice". Diary of a Mod Housewife was written while Rigby was doing temp work in New York.

== Critical reception ==
Professional ratings
Review scores
Source	Rating
AllMusic	4.5/5 stars
Calgary Herald	4.5/5 stars
Robert Christgau	A
The Encyclopedia of Popular Music	4/5 stars
Entertainment Weekly	A−
Lincoln Journal Star	5/5 stars
MusicHound Rock: The Essential Album Guide	4.5/5 stars
Spin	7/10
Winston-Salem Journal	3.5/5 stars

Robert Christgau thought that Rigby personalizes "the political for a bohemia that coexists oh so neatly with structural underemployment [and thinks] harder about marriage than a dozen Nashville homilizers." Entertainment Weekly called the album "an impressive debut," writing that the songs "occupy a world where relationships, jobs, and urban life are rife with unfulfilled promise." The New York Times wrote that, "like Kate McGarrigle and Iris DeMent, Ms. Rigby has a reedy voice with steely underpinnings," writing: "With clear-cut melodies and an exacting eye, songs like 'Beer and Kisses' and 'Just Someone I Had in Mind' measure the distance between romance and reality."

The Philadelphia Inquirer placed the album on the "short" list of "grown-up rock-and-roll records that examine monogamy with insight and intelligence." Stereo Review deemed it "a cross between the Go-Go's, Buddy Holly, and a female cowpunk band." The Winston-Salem Journal called it "a disgruntled look at the disheveled life of a creative thirtysomething woman."

AllMusic wrote that "in addition to her knowing lyrical eye, Rigby is also a terrific composer who synthesizes elements of rock, country, folk and girl group-era pop."

== Track listing ==
No.	Title	Length
1.	"Time for Me to Come Down"
2.	"Sad Tale"
3.	"Beer & Kisses"
4.	"20 Questions"
5.	"Down Side of Love"
6.	"The Good Girls"
7.	"Knapsack"
8.	"Just Someone I Had in Mind"
9.	"Don't Break the Heart"
10.	"That Tone of Voice"
11.	"Didn't I?"
12.	"We're Stronger Than That"
