= Car Records =

Former record label

Car Records was a record label founded in 1977 by Chris Stamey of the powerpop group the dB's. Originally from Winston-Salem, North Carolina, Stamey moved to New York City and started his label where he released the band's first single "(I Thought You) Wanted to Know"/"If and When" under the name Chris Stamey and the dB's in 1978. Also in 1978, Car Records released the first single by Chris Bell (former guitarist of Big Star) "I Am The Cosmos"/"You and Your Sister" (the only solo material released in Bell's lifetime). Car Records was located at 89 Bleecker St.
