= Mavericks (Peter Holsapple and Chris Stamey album) =

Studio album by Peter Holsapple and Chris Stamey
- Released: 1991
- Recorded: 1990, Hoboken, New Jersey
- Genre: Guitar pop, jangle pop
- Length: 46:07
- Label: Rhino
- Producer: Peter Holsapple, Chris Stamey

Peter Holsapple chronology
Mavericks (1991)	Out of My Way (1997)

Mavericks is a collaborative album by the two original singer/songwriters of jangle pop band the dB's, Peter Holsapple and Chris Stamey. It was originally released in 1991 on Rhino Records and was re-released on January 15, 2008 by Collectors' Choice Music. The reissue featured six previously unreleased tracks. The album is noted for having a more acoustic and slower sound than Holsapple and Stamey's work with the dB's.

== Critical reception ==
Professional ratings
Review scores
Source	Rating
AllMusic	4.5/5 stars
Chicago Tribune	2.5/4 stars
Entertainment Weekly	A
Robert Christgau	(choice cut)

Reissue
Review scores
Source	Rating
Blogcritics	(favorable)
No Depression	(favorable)
PopMatters	7/10

=== Initial ===
Upon its release, Mavericks received a very favorable review from Ira Robbins, who wrote in Entertainment Weekly that the album "resonates with emotional power." Robbins gave the album an A grade. A more mixed review appeared in the Chicago Tribune, where Mark Caro gave the album 2.5 stars out of 4 and wrote that "A few of the songs sit there like pudding on a plate, but others... seep in over time."

=== Retrospective ===
After the album was reissued in 2008, Michael Berick wrote in No Depression that Holsapple and Stamey "convey a sense of worldly experience in these songs," and Aarik Danielsen wrote in PopMatters that the album belongs "along the timeline of great heartland/jangle rock recordings of all-time". Holsapple told Magnet in 2009 that people often told him they thought Mavericks was "beautiful".

== Track listing ==
1. "Angels" (Stamey, Holsapple)
2. "I Know You Will" (Holsapple)
3. "Here Without You" (Gene Clark)
4. "Close Your Eyes" (Stamey)
5. "Anymore" (Holsapple)
6. "I Want To Break Your Heart" (Stamey)
7. "She Was The One" (Holsapple)
8. "Geometry" (Stamey)
9. "The Child in You" (Holsapple)
10. "Lovers Rock" (Stamey)
11. "Taken" (Holsapple)
12. "Haven't Got The Right (To Treat Me Wrong)" (Stamey)

== Personnel ==
- Alan Bezozi – Drums
- Michael Blair – Drums, Glockenspiel, Percussion
- Chris Butler – Tambourine
- Greg Calbi – Mastering, Original Mastering
- George Cowan – Mixing
- Geoff Gans – Art Direction
- Gene Holder – Guitar
- Peter Holsapple – Arranger, Autoharp, Bass, Drums, Acoustic and Electric Guitar, Organ, Piano
- James MacMillan – Engineer, Fretless Bass, Vocals
- Ilene Markell – Bass
- Matt Martinez – Mixing
- Brigid Pearson – Art Direction
- Jon Rosenberg – Engineer
- Jane Scarpantoni – Cello
- Bill Scheniman – Audio Engineer, Engineer
- Dave Schramm – Guitar, Steel guitar
- Ann Selznick – Engineer
- Michael Shockley – Tambourine
- John Siket – Engineer
- John Skilett – Audio Engineer
- Chris Stamey – Accordion, Arranger, Bass, Drums, Acoustic and Electric Guitar, Organ, Piano
- Carol Whaley – Photography
