= George Christie (biker) =

Former leader of the Hells Angels

- Born: George Gus Christie Jr. April 26, 1947 (age 79); Ventura, California, U.S.
- Other name: "Dirty George"
- Occupations: Outlaw biker; crime boss; author
- Years active: 1966–2011
- Known for: President of the Ventura Hells Angels chapter
- Allegiance: Hells Angels MC (1975–2011)
- Convictions: Drug possession with intent to distribute (2002); Drug possession (2008); Conspiracy to interfere with commerce (2013)
- Penalty: 1 year in prison (2002); 8 months' probation (2008); 10 months' imprisonment (2013)

George Gus Christie Jr. (born April 26, 1947) is an American author and former outlaw biker who served as president of the Ventura, California, charter of the Hells Angels Motorcycle Club between 1978 and 2011. He is the longest-serving chapter president in the club's history. Christie was also a national spokesman for the Hells Angels. The journalist Alice Carbone Tench described him as "the most notorious Hells Angel in America" (after Sonny Barger).

== Early life ==
George Gus Christie Jr. was born in Ventura, California in 1947, the only child of Greek immigrant parents, and raised in an insular Greek American community in the city. Christie also lived in Camarillo and Anaheim as a child. His maternal grandparents anglicized their surname from Vlassopoulos to Blacy, and his paternal grandparents from Chrispikos to Christie. He described himself as "very timid" and "really sensitive" as a child, and his parents as "very protective, very loving, gentle" people. Christie first became interested in the outlaw biker subculture as a child when he first saw a member of an outlaw motorcycle club on the street when he was in Los Angeles with his father. He noticed that everyone around him was very concerned about the biker but the biker seemed to not care. Christie recalled: "I don’t know how old I was. Seven to 10 years old at the most — this guy made such an impression on me".

Another pivotal moment in Christie's early life which caused him to develop even more of an outsider mentality was when he was accused of cheating on an intelligence quotient test in high school. He struggled in school due to dyslexia, but scored highly on the IQ test, leading him to be accused of cheating by the school principal, who refused to believe that Christie had legitimately fared so well. Christie said of the incident: "I thought to myself, ‘if this is polite society, no thank you'."

Christie became an avid surfer as a teenager. He joined the reserves of the Marine Corps at the age of seventeen after graduating from high school. He did not see service in the Vietnam war. Christie served in the Marine Corps reserves for the rest of the 1960s. In 1966, he bought his first motorcycle for $200, a 1957 Harley-Davidson Panhead. In the late 1960s, Christie was a member in succession of two outlaw biker gangs, the Question Marks in Ventura and Satan's Slaves of Los Angeles. He also began associating with prominent motorcycle customizers including Kenny "Von Dutch" Howard.

Christie was one of the few American outlaw bikers with a college degree. He worked as an electrician for the Defense Department while he married his high school girlfriend Cheryl, who immigrated to Ventura County from Newmarket, Ontario, in 1961. They had two children together, George Christie III and Moriya Christie.

== Hells Angels ==
In 1975, Christie joined the Hells Angels as a "prospect", or probationary member, and in 1976 was initiated as a "full patch" member of the club's Los Angeles County (LACO) chapter. Christie told the Canadian journalists Julian Sher and William Marsden in a 2006 interview: "I really wanted to make a statement of some sort. It really wasn't the thought of criminality; it was more an interest to rebel. It was a commitment". He identified with the Hells Angels' "live and let live" philosophy and claims that, while the Angels took part in brawls with sailors from the Naval Air Base San Pedro and members of rival biker clubs, the level of violence was contained during that period. Christie remarked in an interview with Maggie Yates of the Santa Barbara Independent in 2018: "No one ever went home after a fight and got a gun. The losers would buy breakfast".

Unlike some other members of the Hells Angels, Christie was married with children and would typically carry out club duties at night and on weekends. Reflecting on this in an interview with KNPR in 2018, Christie said: "I was accepted for who I was, what I was. There was a lot of brotherhood back then. It was all based on brotherhood and motorcycles back then." Six months after becoming a full-fledged member of the LACO charter, which was initially based in Glendale before relocating to North Hollywood, he was elected the chapter's president, succeeding "Old Man" John Nobel. The culture within the Hells Angels began to change shortly after Christie joined the club, however, when the Angels in Southern California came into conflict with the Mongols. On 11 March 1977, Christie was one of nine Hells Angels members who were involved in a mass brawl with a large group of Mongols at a motorcycle swap meet in Anaheim, the first skirmish in the feud. Despite being heavily outnumbered, the Hells Angels were able to leave a number of Mongols seriously injured before escaping converging police. Shortly afterwards, the Mongols began wearing a patch on their biker "colors" reading "California", denoting the state as their territory. As the preeminent motorcycle gang in California, the Hells Angels claimed exclusive rights to the patch and took offense to the Mongols' wearing of it. When the Mongols defied the Hells Angels' warnings to cease wearing the "California" patch, the Angels voted unanimously at a club meeting on 7 July 1977, in favor of declaring war on their rivals. The biker war led to an escalation in violence and resulted in the deaths of four Mongols members and an innocent fifteen-year-old boy, in a series of shootings and bombings in the Los Angeles and San Diego areas between July and September 1977.

A second Hells Angels chapter was established in Los Angeles County on 1 January 1978, when members of Satan's Slaves "patched over" to form the Angels' Chatsworth-based San Fernando Valley charter, following a vote of approval from Hells Angels leaders in Oakland. Christie subsequently founded the Hells Angels chapter in Ventura County with himself as the chapter president. The Ventura chapter was founded on 6 May 1978. Claire Spiegel of the Los Angeles Times described the clubhouse of the Ventura chapter as "a nondescript little building with a red steel door warning 'No Bozos. No Wimps'." The same year, Christie was fired from the Defense Department on the account of his Hells Angels membership.

In Ventura County, Christie was a local celebrity who dominated the political and economic life of the county and he was considered to be the most powerful man in Ventura. Mark Coronado of the Ventura County Police Department stated: "People love him. They think he's a god down here". Sher and Marsden wrote in 2006 that Christie was almost universally admired in Ventura, with his image being that of a kind-hearted businessman who was generous in helping others. In 1983, Christie was featured in a cover story in the Los Angeles Times about the "mellowing" of the Hells Angels. The same year, he denied accusations from the California Organized Crime Control Commission, which described the Hells Angels as "the epitome of all outlaw motorcycle gangs", insisting that the Hells Angels are merely a motorcycle club, and saying: "It's a family is what it is".

In 1984 the Bureau of Alcohol, Tobacco, Firearms and Explosives (ATF) circulated a rumor in Ventura that the Hells Angels might disrupt the 1984 Summer Olympics in Los Angeles by supplying weapons to terrorists for an attack at Lake Casitas, which hosted water sports at the games. Christie told the Los Angeles Times in April 1984: "There were rumors around Los Angeles that we would try to disrupt the Olympic Games this summer. That's ridiculous. We're not against the Olympics". In a 2013 interview with the Italian writer Alice Carbone Tench, Christie recalled: "The interesting thing is that they misjudged how integrated in the community we were. We had come here in 1978 and really became part of Ventura; when the ATF came into town, they started doing a character assassination to try to discredit us. I had started getting calls from many businessmen visited by the ATF, showing pictures of myself and my club members. In order to fight those ludicrous statements, we decided to embrace the Olympics and we got involved. The irony is that their program of misinformation to the community drew us in, and made us the 'All American Boys'. We backfired".

The Ventura chapter conducted a national fund drive and raised the $3,000 entry fee necessary for Christie to carry the Olympic torch for one kilometer as part of the 1984 Summer Olympics torch relay. Olympic officials were initially unaware that the cheque, signed H.A.M.C.U.S., was from the Hells Angels Motorcycle Club, United States. On 20 July 1984, Christie carried the torch through Oxnard during the opening rituals for the Los Angeles Olympics. He was cheered on by "hordes" of members of the Hells Angels, Crucifiers and Heathens motorcycle clubs as he arrived with the torch in a remote pea field, outside Point Mugu, in Ventura County, in the culmination of the 15,000 miles (24,000 km) cross-country relay.

Christie donated the $3,000 raised by the Hells Angels to the Special Olympics and designated the funds for a Special Olympics chapter in Pottstown, Pennsylvania. When the donation failed to reach Pottstown, Christie made dozens of phone calls from a pay phone in the Ventura Hells Angels clubhouse to Eunice Kennedy Shriver, the chairwoman of the board of the Special Olympics, to enquire about the location of the funds. Kennedy Shriver corresponded by letter with Christie, informing him of a longstanding policy under which funds are distributed on a 50/50 basis between the Special Olympics headquarters in Washington, D.C. and state chapters, rather than directly to local programs. On 11 June 1985, Christie filed a lawsuit in Los Angeles County Superior Court against the Los Angeles Olympic Organizing Committee (LAOOC) and Special Olympics Inc., in an effort to have the Hells Angels' donation given directly to Pottstown. Each page of the suit was stamped with a seal bearing the Hells Angels death's head logo. The complaint was dismissed. On 15 May 1986, Christie filed a second Superior Court lawsuit against the LAOOC and the Special Olympics.

In the 1990s and 2000s Christie was generally considered to be the second most powerful Hells Angel in the United States and to be the right-hand man of the Hells Angels international president Sonny Barger. After Barger lost his voice due to throat cancer, Christie became the public face of the Hells Angels.

=== Conspiracy trial ===
In 1986 the Federal Bureau of Investigation (FBI) launched a sting operation against Christie, assigning Michael "Slim" Mulhern, a senior Mexican Mafia member and FBI informant, to make Christie an offer to have the Mexican Mafia kill Thomas Arthur Chaney, a former Ventura Hells Angel who had cooperated with the government and provided federal authorities with information on the Hells Angels' drug-dealing activities. Chaney was imprisoned at the Federal Correctional Institution, Safford, Arizona at the time. Beginning in August 1986, Mulhern covertly recorded a number of conversations he had with Christie and another Hells Angel, Daniel Joe Fabricant. Christie allegedly offered Mulhern $500 in cash and a 1973 Pontiac automobile to arrange the killing of Chaney.

The FBI faked Chaney's murder in September 1986 and a note was subsequently sent to the Ventura Hells Angels clubhouse reading: "The body work has been taken care of". Later that month, on 25 September 1986, Christie visited Mulhern at a motel room in Ventura and paid him with an envelope containing five $100 bills and the title to a car. Christie was recorded by Mulhern talking about hiring Mulhern to kill Chaney. The transcript recorded Christie as saying: "I'd do it myself if he were here". The wiretap also recorded Christie as saying to Mulhern: "I’m sure like in a week or so everything will be mellowed out again and, uh, I got something else that will be real easy for you". Coronado commented about the "sting" operation: "George just felt that something wasn't right. He's no dummy". After stepping onto the balcony to ponder what to do, Christie came back into the hotel room to ask Mulhern to return the money, saying: "Hey, Mike? Let, let, let me have that, that envelope, all right?". However, the FBI then stormed into the motel room to arrest Christie on charges of conspiracy to commit murder. Christie insists he was the victim of entrapment with the money being used to pay off an old debt, not payment for a murder. The day after his arrest, Christie was ordered held without bail pending trial. He and Fabricant, an alleged intermediary in the conspiracy, were each indicted by a federal grand jury on one count of conspiracy to murder and one count of solicitation to murder, on October 6, 1986. Christie recalled: "At my first court appearance when they said, 'The United States of America vs George Christie', it sends a little shiver down your spine. The most powerful country in the world and you're up against them".

Christie and Fabricant went on trial in Los Angeles federal court beginning in April 1987. While prosecutors described the case against the defendants as a "straight case of murder-for-hire, very simple, very clean", Christie's defense attorney, Barry Tarlow, contended that the charges against his client were retribution by authorities against Christie, who had no criminal record and who had used the national media attention he had accrued following the 1984 Olympic torch relay, to accuse law enforcement of harassment against the Hells Angels. Tarlow put Mulhern on trial "in a sense" as he attacked his character. Mulhern was an unsavory career criminal and a heroin addict, and Christie's lawyer portrayed him to the jury as a man willing to tell any lie to gain money to support his substance abuse. Tarlow described Mulhern as "a one-man crime wave" and "a pathological liar who would sell out his own mother". Mulhern came across on the stand as unlikeable and as a man who was not telling the truth. Most notably, the federal prosecutors at the trial seemed to have been embarrassed by their star witness, who had a long criminal record and a history of telling lies. Christie, by contrast, when he testified came across as likable and sincere. Much of the government's case was reliant upon recorded conversations Mulhern had with Christie and Fabricant. The defense maintained that Mulhern had a number of unrecorded conversation with Christie, which revealed that the Mexican Mafia had, in fact, wanted to kill Chaney for their own reasons, and were seeking assurance from Christie that there would be no retaliation from the Hells Angels, were the murder to take place.

The trial ended with Christie being acquitted. One member of the jury told the media: "George appeared to be very honest and very sincere and very dedicated not only to his family, but the Hells Angels". To celebrate his acquittal, Christie hosted a party at the Hells Angels Ventura clubhouse that was attended by the members of the jury that acquitted him.

=== Celebrity biker and club spokesman ===
Christie became a media star in California who spoke at the graduating classes at high schools and colleges. Sher and Marsden wrote: "Small in stature and unthreatening, he become a media darling, with his easy laugh and gravelly voice".

On 26 October 1989 the Hells Angels filed a federal trademark infringement lawsuit in Los Angeles against Concorde-New Horizons, which produced the film Nam Angels, and against Media Home Entertainment, which distributed the film on video, over infringements on the club's registered trademarks. Nam Angels depicts a group of Hells Angels on a mercenary mission in the Vietnam War. As the Hells Angels' spokesman Christie said: "There is absolutely no way our board or membership would have approved the portrayal of the Hells Angels in this movie. In fact, the portrayal of our members as disloyal to each other is totally contrary to the most important values of our organization – loyalty and trust". He further stated: "We have a structure in place for negotiating commercial licensing arrangements and we would be perfectly amenable to working with any enterprise interested in using Hells Angels trademarks within the guidelines we've established." The lawsuit was ultimately settled out of court.

In 1990, Christie was interviewed by Mike Wallace on 60 Minutes about the Hells Angels' criminal allegations. When Wallace confronted Christie with a Hells Angels document from 1987 warning that the Angels must not "burn" those involved in drug deals, Christie called the documents forgeries done by unknown hands. Christie told Wallace that the Hells Angels were not involved as an institution in drug dealing. Christie became such a celebrity that, by 1991, he sold the rights to make a film out of his life story to a Hollywood studio. The film, which was to be produced and directed by Michael Mann, was ultimately not made, owing to objections from Cheryl Christie, who disliked the way she was portrayed in the script. When Christie visited Paris, he was hosted by Liza Minnelli at a party.

Law enforcement in Ventura had a different opinion of Christie with one policeman, Ken Corney, saying: "We'd see the continual criminal influence in our city, the intimidation, the beatings and the drug dealing. We arrested little users all the time and small-time dealers who wouldn't give us any names but who readily admitted the methamphetamine and marijuana were from the HA [Hells Angels]. In 1991, the police chief of Ventura County, Richard Thomas, said of the Hells Angels chapter: "They’ve taken the position right from the start that, if they don't screw up in Ventura very much, there’ll be no reason for the police to hassle them. And that has been pretty much the case. The Hells Angels locally have been involved in very few provable criminal incidents." One policeman said of him in 1991: "Christie saved them. They know who their speakers are, and Christie is a very well-spoken member. And he is very charismatic... I’ve seen Christie step in and take care of business when members were getting out of control – getting out of line with law enforcement." The same policeman said Christie is "very difficult to investigate" as: "He's so clean. He keeps himself removed. He's not supposed to be doing the dirty business." The Deputy District Attorney of Ventura County, Roger A. Inman, said in 1991: "He testified in the (1990) Fabricant case. That was the first time I ever saw the mythical George Christie. Let's face it, in some circles, he seems to be somewhat of a folk hero".

Christie owned a tattoo parlor on Main Street, the Ink House, along with a martial arts studio, a bail bonds firm, and a pornographic company, Erotic Images. Christie holds a black belt in karate and was described as an enthusiastic teacher of karate along with kung fu. He sat as an administrator with the law firm where his daughter was an attorney, giving him what he called "legal intelligence" about who was being arrested and charged in Ventura.

=== Criminal allegations ===
In 1994 Christie sponsored his 18-year-old son, George Christie III, into his chapter as a "full patch" member, even though Hells Angels records state that a member must be 21 or older to join. Christie told Sher and Marsden: "Well, he must have had an ID that said he was twenty-one". Christie was concerned about the image of the Hells Angels as "a bunch of old, potbellied men" and stated that "my agenda is moving the Hells Angels forward into this next century". Christie fils was a member of the Pierpont Rats, a group of "rich little white kids", as one policeman put it, who spent their time surfing and skateboarding. A number of Pierpont Rats followed Christie fils into the Hells Angels. One policeman, John Castelanos, stated: "Suddenly our street gang members are hanging around with George. They'd never been on motorcycles! I thought maybe George was going through a mid-life crisis because these guys brought the cute girls from the beach". At the time, Christie was in the middle of a divorce with his wife Cheryl, and he told Sher and Marsden: "Did I have an attraction to young women? Consciously no but... you think, I'm reaching the end of the road here, and suddenly you got these young, good-looking women who think you're pretty good". Castelanos stated: "He was throwing parties for all these kids. It was ludicrous. Young girls were going in and out of there [the Ventura clubhouse]". Christie married a 22-year-old university student, Nikki Nicoletto, whom he met at one of his parties.

Christie fils recruited many of the younger friends into the Hells Angels. The recruitment of young men who dressed in a skateboard style, wore their baseball caps backward, listened to rap and hip-hop music, and had a "punk attitude" led to complaints from the older Hells Angels. One Hells Angel from Arizona told the undercover policeman, Jay Dobyns, about the younger members of the Ventura country chapter: "That's fucking bullshit! These guys are a fucking' embarrassment!" Corney stated: "The nucleus of the club George had formed was spinning out of control. He had very different types of people in the club: different goals, different ways of looking at things. He had splintered his own club".

A police report dated 18 April 1997 declared: "Several new trends including the use of street gangs in the sale of methamphetamines, the extortion of businesses in the city of Ventura and money laundering through businesses owned and operated by members and associates... Recent intel indicates a power struggle will ensue when Sonny Barger dies and George Christie continues to be the main man on the west coast. It is believed that George Christie and the current president of the Oakland HA chapter will vie for the top position as national president". In 1998, to celebrate the semicentennial of the founding of the Hells Angels in 1948, Christie hosted the Hells Angels World Run in Ventura, a significant honor within the group. More than 100 Hells Angels from the United States, Australia, New Zealand, Canada, and Europe attended the jubilee celebrations. Christie hosting the golden jubilee celebrations was widely taken as a sign that he was the successor to Barger. Corney stated: "We were well on our way to becoming the HA hub for the world – or at least the U.S. He was the Al Capone of the city". When Sher and Marsden informed Christie about the claim that he was the "Al Capone of Ventura", he replied: "How do I respond? I take it as a compliment". In 1998, the Ventura County Reporter newspaper in its annual list of the top ten "Movers and Shakers" of Ventura placed Christie at number one on the list. The newspaper wrote: "A colorful, well-spoken individual... ever articulate... Christie brings an undeniable sense of character to Ventura".

In the spring of 1998 a group of teenagers who were friends with the younger Hells Angels founded a gang known as the Outfit. Christie insists that there was no connection between himself and the Outfit, but his son was one of the leaders of the Outfit. One policeman, Monty Pulido, noticed that in the spring of 1998: "On one of the side streets near the school, I would see a couple of full patch Hells Angels sitting on their bikes after school. They'd be talking to a couple of kids". At the same time, the police noticed that the drug Vicodin, a pain killer known for being very addictive, had become popular with high school students in Ventura County. The Outfit wore, as a sort of uniform, clothing that was colored red and white (the colors of the Hells Angels), and many members had the phone numbers of the Hells Angels listed in their cell phones. Members of the Outfit performed chores for the Hells Angels and served as their spies, watching the movements of the police. One member of the Outfit, in an email to another, wrote: "Do you ever see George Christie in jail? That's because he runs his shit right. What I'm seeing and hearing is that our shit is known. We are targets for the police".

At the same time, Christie was the subject of an investigation into tax evasion and money laundering, with the charge being made that the Ink House was a front for money laundering. Christie had been the subject of a joint federal-state-county task force investigation that involved the Bureau of Alcohol, Tobacco, Firearms and Explosives; the District Attorney's Office of Ventura County; the California Highway Patrol; the Internal Revenue Service, the Ventura County Police Department; the Secret Service; and the Ventura County Sheriff's Office. The District Attorney of Ventura, Michael Bradbury, gave orders to have Christie "prosecuted whatever it takes" and assigned a new team led by Jeffery Bennett and Mark Pachowitz for that task. On 18 May 1998, the police raided the Ink House, Christie's home, and the house of Christie's ex-wife, Cheryl, who served as the accountant for the Ventura chapter. Found inside of the Ink House were 1,393 pills of Vicodin; about 12 Vicodin pills at Christie's house; and at Cheryl Christie's house, 23 bottles with 500 Vicodin pills each and 28 bottles with 100 pills each. At the time, Vicodin addiction had become a serious problem with Ventura teenagers, with many high school students taking as many as 24 Vicodin pills per day. A number of Outfit members were arrested at the time for selling Vicodin, which led the police to suspect there was a link between Christie and the Outfit. The police discovered, via the serial numbers on their lids, that the Vicodin pills found on the Christie properties and at the Ink House were manufactured for the United States Air Force, and had been stolen by an Air Force pharmacy clerk, Joshua Adams, who was selling them on the black market to a Hells Angels associate, Rogelio Botello. Adams had stolen over 700,000 pills from the pharmacy at the Air Force base he was stationed at. The police put Botello and Adams under investigation.

In October 1998 Botello was recorded by a police wiretap as saying that the Hells Angels were the only source of Vicodin in California, and that the price for Vicodin was $700 per bottle. One Hells Angels of the Ventura chapter, Kenny Collins, was recorded as saying that the Hells Angels controlled the market for Vicodin and methamphetamine in Ventura County. When Barger moved to Arizona in October 1998, Christie reportedly took over the daily operations of the Hells Angels in California. In early 1999, Christie played a key role in negotiating the end of the long-standing biker war that the Hells Angels had been waging against the Outlaws ever since 1969. In March 1999, Christie received a delegation of Outlaws at the Ventura County clubhouse for the peace talks.

An indictment filed by the Ventura County District Attorney stated that the Hells Angels sold Vicodin and Valium to the Outfit between June 1997 and January 1999, with the intention "to sell and distribute to minors". The same indictment alleged that a member of the Outfit celebrated his birthday at the Hells Angels clubhouse, an allegation that Christie denies. Christie stated: "I find that is a vague and broad statement. Did we get a cake for him? I don't know who this kid is. I couldn't pick him out of a crowd". However, Christie does admit that teenagers regularly attended parties at his clubhouse. Photographs seized by the police showed a number of teenage girls wearing tight shorts and T-shirts drinking at parties at the Ventura country clubhouse. Christie placed a sign on the wall of the clubhouse which was apparently intended for his teenage guests which gave a message to the effect that whatever happened in the clubhouse was never to be spoken of after leaving the clubhouse.

About the allegation that his chapter was selling drugs to teenagers via the Outfit, Christie stated: "I don't care about respectability, but I command respect. How can you respect a man who sells drugs to kids?" Christie admits that he knew Botello, but "not very well at all". About the Vicodin pills seized in his house on 18 May 1998, Christie states that the pills were only for his use and not for sale. Concerning the 25,000 Vicodin pills seized at his ex-wife's house, he stated: "I'm not a foolish man, and I would not make a statement that those are for personal use". As for the Vicodin pills seized at the Ink House, Christie stated: "They never found my prints. My prints are on nothing". When Sher and Marsden asked Christie why the pills at the Ink House were found in a locked office which he had a key for, he replied: "I do have a key. I wasn't involved, but it came back to bite me".

The raids of 18 May 1998 were ordered by Michael Bradbury, the District Attorney (DA) for Ventura County, without consulting the federal agencies. Sher and Marsden stated that Bradbury wanted the glory of convicting Christie for himself, and the raids caused the collapse of the task force, as the federal agencies pulled out in protest against a DA who did not want to co-operate with them. The loss of the expertise provided by the federal agencies hampered the resulting investigation. The investigation into Christie was plagued by in-fighting, as the Sheriff's office and the DA's office proved to be incapable of working together. One Sheriff's deputy recalled that the DA's office hired investigators to follow him around to find out what he knew about Christie while refusing to share intelligence, which made for a highly dysfunctional and poisonous working relationship with the DA's office. Senior deputy assistant DA Jeffery Bennett had prepared a "sting" operation under which bottles full of fake Vicodin pills were to be supplied to Botello, out of the hope that he would give them to Christie, but the Sheriff's office arrested Botello before the "sting" could be executed. The Sheriff's office were able to pressure one member of the Ventura chapter, Paul Wilson, to turn state's evidence in exchange for a lighter sentence after he was arrested for drug possession. Wilson wore a wire to meetings of the Ventura chapter, but Christie communicated by writing on an erasable board. One Sheriff's deputy stated "Christie isn't stupid".

The Ventura police arrested David Gerradin, the vice president of the Ventura chapter, and persuaded him to turn state's evidence after he failed to register as a sex offender, which would have been his third conviction under California's "three strikes" law. The DA's office was able to have the task of running him as an informer transferred over to them. Coronado stated: "We screwed up. We should have kept him". Gerradin, a drug addict known for being a bully, proved to be a difficult informer to handle. Gerradin did not wear a wire to his meetings with Christie, and instead, gave verbal briefings to the DA's office after his meetings with Christie. Coronado declared: "He could have gone in and talked to George about anything in the world. They never did it. There was so much potential to take down the Ventura chapter, but they let it get away from them. I could have sworn that we were all on the same side working on the same crooks!" The DA's office itself was plagued by in-fighting as the District Attorney, Michael Bradbury, removed the senior assistant DA, Mark Pachowitz, from the Christie case, leaving Bennett's efforts to be crippled. Bennett stated: "Half the case was in Mark's head, the other half was in mine. I tried to tell the boss it was like sawing off my leg".

=== Convictions ===
The DA's office and the Sheriff's office led separate and rival investigations into Christie. The Sheriff's office was able, via informers, to have drugs purchased 25 times from the members of the Angels' Ventura chapter in 1998 and 1999. In April 1999, the Sheriff of Ventura County announced in a press conference that nine Hells Angels had been arrested on charges of selling Vicodin, Valium, cocaine and methamphetamines. In July 2000, Bennet called for a grand jury to issue indictments, which took eight months and 186 witnesses, as the DA's office had only a circumstantial case against Christie. On 23 February 2001, Christie was arrested and was charged with 57 counts of theft, fraud, tax evasion, drug sales to minors and the use of a street gang in a criminal conspiracy. The judge agreed to the DA's demand that Christie post $1 million in cash in bail and Christie spent almost all of the next year in jail, as he was unable to raise the necessary $1 million. On 9 January 2002, he was released on bail after the judge ruled that he could use his property worth $2 million as a bail surety. Being held in solitary confinement for nearly a year in the Ventura County jail imposed a visible physical strain on Christie, and it was observed that his jail experiences had aged him. The case did not go to trial, following a ruling on another case that a grand jury indictment was invalid because women were underrepresented on the grand jury. As men were overrepresented on the grand jury that had indicted Christie, Bennett was faced with the choice of either dropping the charges or bringing in a new and more gender-balanced grand jury to indict Christie again.

On 13 January 2002, Bennett reached a plea bargain with Christie. On 19 March 2002, Christie pleaded guilty to one count of conspiracy to possess Vicodin with the intention of sales and pleaded no contest to the charge of filing false tax returns. The rest of the charges against Christie were dropped as per the plea bargain. Christie stated: "Hey, they want their pound of flesh. Maybe this is the time to give it to them. You never know what can happen in a trial". At Christie's sentencing hearing on 18 April 2002, Bennett asked for seven years in prison, but the judge sentenced Christie to 390 days in prison with credit for the time served in jail, which meant he served almost no prison time. Christie said of his conviction: "I am a lucky criminal. Yes, I am lucky. But I also wasn't guilty". Christie fils resigned from the Hells Angels to become a chef. Christie pere said in 2005 of his son's decision to leave the Angels: "I tried to talk him out of it. Maybe someday he'll come back. The door is open".

Christie remained proud of being a Hells Angel, as Sher and Marsden noted in 2006 that he had a number of Filthy Few patches, which the police say is awarded to those who kill for the Angels. Christie denies the allegation: "That's what law enforcement says. I say it's for the people that are the core of the partying aspect of the club". Alongside his Filthy Few patches on his living room wall were photographs of Christie with the actors Mickey Rourke and David Carradine. Christie owned two properties in Ventura with a house in the city and an estate in Oak View. Sher and Marsden described Christie's living room as typical of a cultured haute-bourgeois businessman full of books, such as a retrospective of the work of Claude Monet and The Yale Shakespeare along with DVD collections of The Sopranos TV show and The Godfather films. Christie remains angry about the allegations as he stated in 2006: "I don't want my legacy to be that I sold drugs to kids, that the Ventura HA sold drugs to kids or that the Hells Angels at large sold drugs to kids or had anything to do with that". Christie does admit that his chapter's association with the Outfit and allowing teenagers to attend parties at his clubhouse were errors, as he declared: "I never thought in a million years that the police would take this allegation of selling drugs to kids, latch on to it and just beat it into the ground".

In late 2004, when the long-time Ventura police chief, Mike Tracy, retired, Christie took part in the send-off video as he extolled his friendship with Tracy. Christie told Sher and Marsden: "I am who I am, and I make no apologies for anything I've done. We are a society onto ourselves. We govern ourselves. We discipline ourselves". When Sher and Marsden asked him if he was the leader of a criminal conspiracy or just merely a weak leader who was unable to stop the members of his chapter from selling drugs, Christie grew uncomfortable and stated: "Certainly nobody wants to be considered a bad leader. So the question you're asking encompasses a lot of issues of morality, friendship. You can't control what everybody's doing all the time and sometimes it's better not to know. You know we're not Boy Scouts, nor do we pretend to be Boy Scouts". Christie then pointed to his chess case and said: "They are learning from their mistakes and I'm learning from my mistakes. I think we're having a rematch".

The Christie case was the longest and most expensive criminal case in the history of Ventura. Sher and Marsden wrote that the Christie case was a case where no-one won. The investigation and prosecution of Christie cost millions, and many in Ventura County were unhappy that the case ended with a plea bargain given the vast sums of money that had been spent. The way that the police and prosecutors involved in the Christie case were caught up in ego-driven feuds and dysfunctional working relationships did much damage to the reputation of law enforcement in Ventura. Coronado called the Christie case a "complete failure", with Christie being convicted of only one "lightweight crap" count in a plea bargain. The majority of the members of the Outfit were convicted on various counts of assault, attempted murder, criminal conspiracy, possession of controlled substances, and in the cases of two Outfit members who stabbed a man to death at a concert in July 1998, second degree murder. Most of the Pierpont Rats gang were convicted of various drug and conspiracy charges, and Castelanos stated: "At first they liked the power, the glory. Then they started realizing that George was just using them". Of the Hells Angels' Ventura chapter, 16 were convicted of various counts of criminal conspiracy and drug possession charges. Of the 16 convicted, eight were "full patch" members, and in a damaging move for the reputation of the Hells Angels, five made plea bargains where they pledged guilty to criminal conspiracy charges "in association with a criminal street gang". The case did much damage to Christie's reputation among the Hells Angels, with the feeling being that he was a poor judge of character, as many members of his chapter turned state's evidence. Botello was convicted of criminal conspiracy charges and received 6 years in prison. Adams was given a dishonorable discharge from the Air Force and was sentenced to 4 years in prison after his conviction. Sher and Marsden wrote that the biggest losers in the Christie case were the countless teenagers who became addicted to Vicodin who ended up dropping out of the middle class into poverty owing to their substance abuse.

In 2008, Christie pleaded guilty to one count of the possession of 2 grams of cocaine and methamphetamine and another count of being under the influence of a controlled substance. His sentence was eight months of probation.

== Retirement ==
In April 2011, Christie retired from the Hells Angels, alleging that they had become too combative and he believed that the resulting aggression would be turned inward; Christie then returned his biker's jacket with the Hells Angels patch to his club. Scott Sutton, the current president of the Ventura County chapter, claimed in 2015 that Christie retired because he was on the brink of being expelled for abuse of power. Barger placed Christie in a state of disgrace and banned all Hells Angels from having any social contact with him. Christie states that he is not in fear of his life, but he is concerned about his break with the Hells Angels.

In August 2011, Christie was arrested on charges of ordering the bombings of two tattoo shops in 2007. Christie was accused of ordering the bombings of Scratch the Surface and Twisted Ink tattoo shops, which were competing with the Ink House. At the time of his arrest, Christie was the subject of a documentary being made by a British filmmaker Nick Mead entitled American Ride, which continued to be filmed after his arrest by the FBI.

The trial began in January 2013, but on the second day of the trial, a plea bargain was struck where Christie pleaded guilty to one of the charges in exchange for the other seven being dropped. Christie pleaded guilty to one count of conspiracy to interfere with commerce and on September 2013, was sentenced to 10 months in prison which he served in Texas at the Federal Correctional Institution, La Tuna. The documentary about Christie by Mead was released in 2013 under the title The Last American Outlaw.

In August 2015, Christie hosted the television show the Outlaw Chronicles about his life on the History Channel. In September 2016, Christie published a memoir, Exile on Front Street, in which he portrayed Barger as an abusive husband and father who beat his wife and children and who would call the police for help when faced with difficulties, which was a violation of the outlaw biker code. Christie's memoir, Exile on Front Street, was described in a review as offering a near-mythic portrayal of the outlaw biker lifestyle that, while amusing, downplayed the criminal allegations against him. In 2018, Christie starred in a one-man play, Outlaw, that was based on Exile on Front Street. At present, Christie lives with his wife in Ojai.

== Works ==
- Exile on Front Street: My Life as a Hells Angel (Thomas Dunne Books, 2016) ISBN 9780283072666
- Marked: A Story of Lies, Loyalty, Betrayal, and Brotherhood (DTLA Publishing, 2017) ISBN 0999077600
- Outlaw: Riding Through the Storm (BookBaby, 2021) ISBN 9781667836829
- Crossing the Rubicon (BookBaby, 2026) ISBN 9798317826116
