= Like This (album) =

Studio album by The dB's
- Released: September 12, 1984
- Studios: Bearsville Studios, Bearsville, New York
- Genres: Power pop, alternative rock
- Length: 34:36
- Label: Bearsville
- Producers: Chris Butler, The dB's

The dB's chronology
Repercussion (1981)	Like This (1984)	The Sound of Music (1987)

Singles from Like This
- 1. "Love Is for Lovers" Released: 1984

Like This is the third studio album by the American power pop band the dB's, released in 1984 via Bearsville Records. The band recorded as a trio following the departure of Chris Stamey. The album includes a re-mixed version of "Amplifier", the lead single from their previous album, Repercussion.

The album's cover is a collection of stills from the music video for their 1982 single "Neverland", which went unreleased until 2008. Stamey, who was present for the video shoot, was edited out of the stills adorning the cover.

== Critical reception ==
Professional ratings
Review scores
Source	Rating
AllMusic	3.5/5 stars
Robert Christgau	A−
The Encyclopedia of Popular Music	3/5 stars
MusicHound Rock: The Essential Album Guide	4/5 stars
The Philadelphia Inquirer	3/4 stars
The Rolling Stone Album Guide	4/5 stars
Spin Alternative Record Guide	7/10

Trouser Press called the album "an instantly lovable gem," writing that "although the reliance on [Peter] Holsapple’s songwriting cut down on the band’s eccentricities, unpretentious intelligence, wit and ineffable pop smarts make it a wonderful album with no weak spots or inadequate songs." The Chicago Tribune deemed it a "minor pop masterpiece." The New York Times wrote that the Stamey-less songs "are less crammed with melodic and verbal ideas than earlier dB's material. They also sound more integrated and less like strings of pop quotations." The Sun Sentinel thought that "the weakness here (and probably what sank it on radio) is the strained vocals."

== Track listing ==
All tracks composed by Peter Holsapple

1. "Love Is for Lovers"
2. "She Got Soul"
3. "Spitting in the Wind"
4. "Lonely Is (As Lonely Does)"
5. "Not Cool"
6. "Amplifier"
7. "A Spy in the House of Love"
8. "Rendezvous"
9. "New Gun in Town"
10. "On the Battlefront"
11. "White Train"

CD bonus tracks

12. "Darby Hall"
13. "A Spy in the House of Love" (Extended Version)

== Personnel ==
- Peter Holsapple – rhythm guitar, lead vocals, keyboards, mandolin
- Gene Holder – bass guitar, lead guitar, keyboards
- Will Rigby – drums, backing vocals, keyboards, co-lead vocals on "Not Cool" and "White Train"

=== Additional musicians ===
- Mark Tomeo – Pedal steel guitar
- Patrick Irwin – Keyboards
- Rick Wagner – Keyboards
- Phil Marino – design, photography
