= It's Alright (Chris Stamey album) =

Studio album by Chris Stamey
- Released: 1987
- Label: Coyote/A&M
- Producer: Chris Stamey, Scott Litt, Bill Scheniman

Chris Stamey chronology
Instant Excitement EP (1984)	It's Alright (1987)	Fireworks (1991)

It's Alright is an album by the American musician Chris Stamey, released in 1987. Stamey supported it with a North American tour that included Alex Chilton on keyboards. It's Alright was expected to be somewhat of a mainstream success; it did not perform as well as envisioned, and Stamey was dropped from A&M Records two years after its release.

== Production ==
"The Seduction" was inspired by Georges Seurat's A Sunday Afternoon on the Island of La Grande Jatte. Stamey played lead guitar on the album; Richard Lloyd and Mitch Easter played rhythm guitar. Chilton and Marshall Crenshaw sang on It's Alright. Jane Scarpantoni played cello.

== Critical reception ==
Professional ratings
Review scores
Source	Rating
AllMusic	4.5/5 stars
Chicago Sun-Times	4/4 stars
Robert Christgau	B
The Encyclopedia of Popular Music	4/5 stars
Los Angeles Daily News	A
MusicHound Rock: The Essential Album Guide	4/5 stars
The Record	2.5/4 stars
The Rolling Stone Album Guide	4/5 stars

Trouser Press called It's Alright "an emotionally lucid pop-rock album." The Philadelphia Inquirer labeled it "an impressive and graceful solo pop-rock album that presents his gifts for songwriting and guitar-playing in full flower." The Los Angeles Daily News considered it "a near masterpiece," writing that "Stamey makes his way through the lost terrain covered by mid-'70s Memphis-based popsters Big Star."

Robert Christgau wrote that "Stamey's new wave supersession is excessively conventional, subsuming his mad pop perfectionism and repressed inner turmoil in mere well-madeness." The Washington Post opined that "tracks such as 'It's Alright' and 'If You Hear My Voice' are elaborate studio chamber pieces in the spirit of the best of the late-'60s Beatles and Beach Boys." The Charlotte Observer determined that, "with a wispy voice, shimmering pop-rock melodies and lyrics full of irony and disillusionment, Stamey looks suspiciously at modern love."

AllMusic deemed It's Alright "the most uncomplicated and genuinely poppy album of his career."

== Track listing ==
No.	Title	Length
1.	"Cara Lee"
2.	"From the Word Go"
3.	"When We're Alone"
4.	"The Seduction" (Full Length Version)
5.	"It's Alright"
6.	"Big Time"
7.	"Of Time and All She Brings to Mind"
8.	"In the Dark"
9.	"If You Hear My Voice"
10.	"27 Years in a Single Day" (Full Length Version)
11.	"Incredible Happiness"
