= Peter Holsapple =

American musician

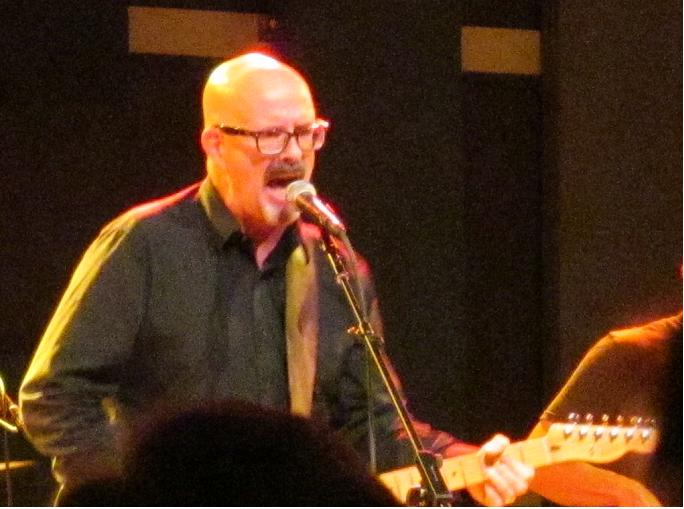
- Holsapple in 2012

Background information
- Born: February 19, 1956 (age 70); Greenwich, Connecticut, U.S.
- Occupation: Musician
- Instruments: Guitar; bass; keyboards; vocals
- Years active: 1970–present
- Member of: The dB's

Peter Livingston Holsapple (born February 19, 1956) is an American musician who, along with Chris Stamey, formed the dB's, a jangle-pop band from Winston-Salem, North Carolina. He became the band's principal songwriter and singer after Stamey's departure. The band, with Stamey back in the fold, reformed with new material in 2005–2006.

After the dB's disbanded in 1988, Holsapple played as an auxiliary musician with R.E.M. and Hootie & the Blowfish, before joining the Continental Drifters, a rock band originating from Los Angeles.

In 1997, he released his first solo album, Out of the Way. He followed it up twenty-one years later with Game Day and with Face of 68 in 2025.

== Early life ==
Holsapple was born in 1956 in Greenwich, Connecticut, to Henry and Ann. He moved south with his family to Winston-Salem, North Carolina, in 1962. He had an older brother, Merritt (named for their maternal grandfather), who died in 1997, aged 52. Merritt was a fan of the Beach Boys and the Left Banke, which got his brother listening to them as well.

Holsapple graduated from R. J. Reynolds High School.

== Musical career ==
=== School bands ===
Holsapple began writing songs in third grade, and began playing in bands in 1964, when he was 7 or 8, beginning with the three-piece Dana & the Blue Jays. In 1969, he formed Soup with Chris Stamey. They played one show together, at a local church coffeehouse. In 1970, he joined Rittenhouse Square, which included Mitch Easter, Stamey and Bobby Locke. They released an independent album in 1972, recorded at Crescent City Sound Studios in Greensboro, North Carolina, in the spring of 1971. 500 copies were pressed.

When Rittenhouse broke up, Holsapple joined future dB's drummer Will Rigby and several other former high-school friends in Little Diesel, a proto-punk rock band fronted by Bob Northcott which ran against the tastes of Southern rock. Little Diesel's album, the 17-track No Lie (produced by Stamey in 1974) was released on twenty 8-track cartridges, and it was re-released in 2006 on Telstar Records. "Kissy Boys" was an original, as were two early songs of Holsapple's. The band's music was heavily inspired by Lenny Kaye's 1972 compilation Nuggets: Original Artyfacts from the First Psychedelic Era, 1965–1968.

=== The dB's ===
College broke Little Diesel up, but Holsapple continued to write and sing, eventually moving to New York City from Memphis ("thinking some of the Big Star magic might rub off on me"), where he had recorded at Sam Phillips Studio with Big Star engineer Richard Rosebrough, three months into the dB's existence. While working part-time at a record store called Musical Maze at 294 Third Avenue, in October 1978 Holsapple joined as an organ player and backing vocalist, but he quickly began submitting his songs, playing guitar, and singing lead vocals alongside Stamey. Holsapple and Chilton's cuts from Memphis were released by Omnivore on The Death of Rock in 2018.

The dB's released four studio albums before their disbandment in 1988: Stand for Decibels (1981), Repercussion (1981), Like This (1984) and The Sound of Music (1987).

In 1981, while living in New York City, Holsapple would often hear the dBs' first single, "Black and White", on Meg Griffin's Saturday-morning show on WXRK. "There's something about hearing that pumping out on the radio, when you drive into town and you hear yourself on a college radio station as you're getting close, it's just so cool that it makes you feel like, 'Yeah, I'm doing the right thing, this is exactly what I want to do,'" said Holsapple in 2022.

Stamey left the band after their second album, at which point Holsapple became the primary singer-songwriter.

=== R.E.M. ===
After the dB's broke up in 1988, Holsapple worked as a full-time auxiliary guitarist, bassist and keyboardist for R.E.M. on the Green world tour. He participated in the writing and development, as well as the recording, of their 1991 multi-platinum release Out of Time, but subsequently left his sideman role with R.E.M. due to rumored disputes over songwriting credits. "It was a privilege to get to play those beautiful songs every night for months," he said in 2022.

=== 1990s and beyond ===
Holsapple next worked with Hootie & the Blowfish as an auxiliary musician. He remained with them for 26 years.

He joined the Continental Drifters, for whom he had first produced some demos, a single, and the Nineteen Ninety-Three album. "Easily the best band I ever was a part of," Holsapple recalls. "Superb harmonies, top-shelf songwriting, and my favorite people on earth. We should all be so lucky to find friends like that." The band was originally based out of Los Angeles but the members eventually relocated to New Orleans. The band included members of the Dream Syndicate, the Bangles, and the Cowsills. Holsapple subsequently married Susan Cowsill and had a daughter. The group went on to record three well-received albums, an EP of Sandy Denny and Richard Thompson covers, and several tribute-album tracks, none of which translated into a lot of sales. Holsapple and Cowsill divorced in 2001, with Holsapple citing his reliance on alcohol at the time as a contributing factor.

In 1991, Holsapple and Stamey reunited to record an album entitled Mavericks, and a couple of years later Holsapple contributed to Melissa Ferrick's 1993 album Massive Blur. In 1997, he released his first solo album, Out of My Way.

In September 2005, the classic line-up of the dB's performed two shows in Chicago and two in Hoboken, New Jersey. December 2006 brought Stamey–Holsapple Christmas shows in North Carolina. The Bowery Ballroom in New York City hosted the dB'S in January 2007, and the following month the dB's made a brief appearance at Cat's Cradle in Carrboro, North Carolina.

Holsapple and Stamey released a new duo album, hERE aND nOW, on Bar/None Records in June 2009. This album featured a cover of the British progressive rock band Family's 1972 single "My Friend the Sun."

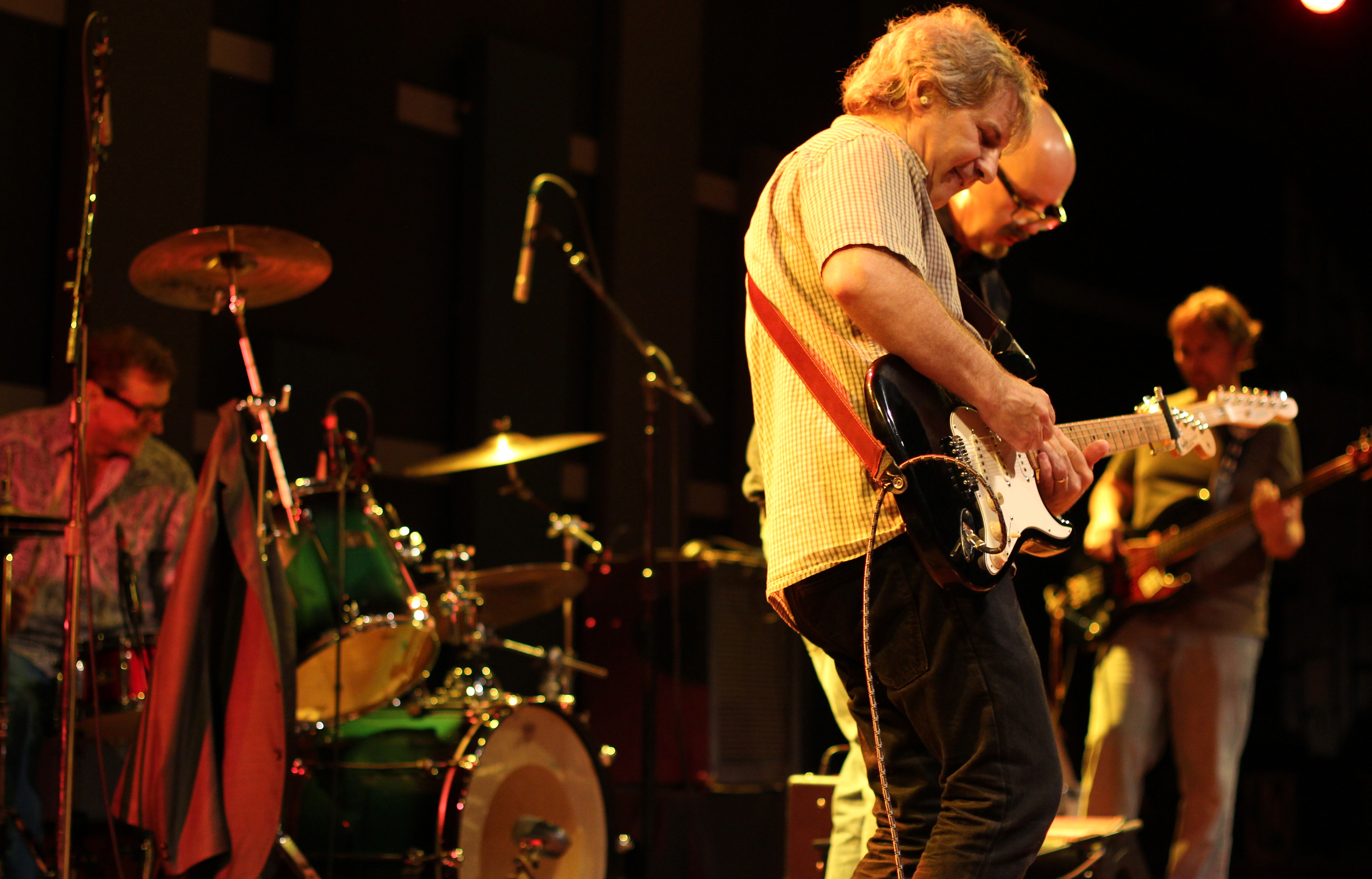
The dB's in 2012

In 2012, Holsapple reunited with the dB's to complete their first new studio album in 25 years and their first in 30 years with the original 1978 lineup. Falling Off the Sky was released on Bar/None Records on June 12, 2012.

Holsapple released a solo single, "Don't Mention the War", on his own Hawthorne Curve Records on February 3, 2017, and released his second solo album, Game Day, in July 2018 on the Omnivore label. His record label is named for a notorious section of Interstate 40 in Winston-Salem.

On June 12, 2021, Holsapple and Stamey released Our Back Pages on Omnivore, an album of acoustic arrangements of songs by the dB's for Record Store Day.

Holsapple undertook a Peter Holsapple Makes Himself at Home Tour in 2022.

In 2024, Holsapple was playing with The Paranoid Style, alongside Michael Venutolo-Mantovani.

On Record Store Day 2025 (April 12), Holsapple released his third solo album, The Face of 68, on Label 51 Recordings.

== Personal life ==
Holsapple has three children (a daughter from his second marriage and a son and daughter from his third), and is also a grandfather.

In the aftermath of Hurricane Katrina, Holsapple relocated from New Orleans to Durham, North Carolina. He has a small recording studio behind his home which he calls the Hit Shed.

His father died in 2008, at the age of 95. "He was the kindest man I've ever known," Holsapple said in 2024. His mother died in 2013, aged 91.
