= Amy Rigby =

American singer-songwriter (born 1959)

Amy Rigby (born Amelia McMahon, January 27, 1959) is an American singer-songwriter. After playing with several New York bands she began a solo career, recording several albums which had only modest sales despite enthusiastic reviews. She settled into a career of touring while raising a daughter, then formed a duo with Wreckless Eric, whom she also married. As of November 2011 they continue to tour from a base in upstate New York. She is the author of a memoir, Girl to City.

== Biography ==
Rigby was born in the Pittsburgh suburbs and raised Catholic. She moved to New York City in 1976. She married dB's drummer Will Rigby in the 1980s, and during the late 1980s and early 1990s recorded with New York bands such as The Shams and Last Roundup. She had a daughter with Rigby, but the marriage ended in divorce in the 1990s.

In 1999 Rigby moved to Nashville to pursue a publishing deal, and continued to record and tour.

Rigby met Eric Goulden, also known as Wreckless Eric, in Hull, England, where she was performing one of his songs, and they married. She later relocated to Cleveland, Ohio, and in late 2006 she and Goulden moved to France. In the fall of 2011 they moved back to the USA, settling in a town in upstate New York. Rigby and Goulden collaborated on albums.

Rigby wrote a memoir of her journey from suburban Pittsburgh to New York City, and her journey to becoming a musician. Girl to City was published in July 2019.

== Music career ==
Rigby released her first full-length recording under her own name, Diary of a Mod Housewife, in 1996. Village Voice critic Robert Christgau praised the album, calling it "concept album of the year". Spin voted Rigby "Songwriter of the Year" for 1996. Middlescence and The Sugar Tree (like Mod Housewife, recorded for Koch Records) also were well received by critics and listeners. Koch also released Rigby's compilation album, 18 Again.

After leaving Koch, she recorded for the Signature Sounds label, and also sold live CD and DVD material through her website. Til The Wheels Fall Off, with its opening track, "Why Do I," produced by Richard Barone, was released on Signature in 2003, and Little Fugitive in 2005. The weekly newspaper The Nashville Scene said that Little Fugitive "finds Rigby as sharp as ever, even as many of the songs evince the fuzz of dislocation...or the exasperation of a survivor who hasn't lost her sense of humor but knows that jokes have their limits."

She writes lyrics about the trials of a cash-strapped single mother in an uncaring world. "The Good Girls" is a song about consumerism and underemployment, for example. Asked by her manager if she would not be able to write the same kind of songs after starting a happy relationship, she responded "No problem. I'm still poor", before cranking out a lyric about her beau's ex-wife. Another trademark is outrageous sexual humor, as in the songs "I Hate Every Bone in Her Body" and "Are We Ever Going to Have Sex Again?"

Rigby uses basic chord structures derived from '60s rock and pop music. Her records are as notable for their musical sophistication as for their lyrical directness.

Her influences also include New York City punk rock, especially as played at the famous CBGB club, as well as the Beatles and other mid-1960s pop. One of her recent songs is entitled "Dancing With Joey Ramone."

Ronnie Spector, Sara Hickman, and Laura Cantrell have recorded compositions by Rigby.

In 2008 Wreckless Eric & Amy Rigby was released; the pair toured to support the album.

== Discography ==
=== as a member of Last Roundup ===
- Twister 1987

=== as a member of The Shams ===
- Quilt 1990
- Sedusia EP, 1993

=== Solo albums ===
- Diary of a Mod Housewife, 1996
- Middlescence, 1998
- The Sugar Tree, 2000
- 18 Again – An Anthology, 2002
- Til The Wheels Fall Off, 2003
- Faulkner, Dylan, Heinz and Me, 2004
- Little Fugitive, 2005
- The Old Guys, 2018
- A One Way Ticket to My Life [Demos 1990–95], 2019
- Hang In There With Me, 2024

=== with Wreckless Eric ===
- Wreckless Eric & Amy Rigby, 2008
- Two-Way Family Favourites, 2010
- A Working Museum, 2012
