= You Should Be So Lucky =

Studio album by Benmont Tench
- Released: February 18, 2014
- Recorded: January 2–12, 2013
- Studios: Sunset Sound Recorders, Hollywood, California, US
- Genre: Jazz
- Length: 44:47
- Language: English
- Label: Blue Note
- Producer: Glyn Johns

Benmont Tench chronology
You Should Be So Lucky (2014)	The Melancholy Season (2023)

“I’ve always written songs since I was a kid, always. In Mudcrutch we all wrote songs, and when it got to the focus on Tom and the Heartbreakers I kept writing songs but it wasn’t anything that was up the Heartbreakers tree, I didn’t think — and I don’t think they did, either. So I kept writing songs for the hell of it, but I didn’t want to make record just for the sake of making a record. This time around I kinda felt like, ‘Well, there’s some good songs here, and I think they should exist in some way other than a demo hidden in my closet. I think they deserve to be heard.'”

— Tench on songwriting and release his solo debut.

You Should Be So Lucky is the debut studio album by American rock musician Benmont Tench, released on Blue Note Records in 2014. The album has received positive reviews from critics.

== Recording, release, and promotion ==
Prior to You Should Be So Lucky, Tench had been the keyboardist for Tom Petty and the Heartbreakers for decades and had amassed several songs he had written that he felt would not work well with that group. When his pre-Heartbreakers group Mudcrutch reunited in 2007, it encouraged Tench to bring his own compositions to the group and perform them live for the first time. He took up an offer from long-time rock music producer Glyn Johns to produce him and booked 11 days in Sunset Sound Recorders. The session included several of Tench's friends as studio musicians, including bandmate Tom Petty.

== Reception ==
According to the review aggregator Metacritic, You Should Be So Lucky received "generally favorable reviews" based on a weighted average score of 73 out of 100 from seven critic scores. Editors at AllMusic rated this album 4 out of 5 stars, with critic Stephen Thomas Erlewine writing> that Tench "lays back, letting the listener come to him, never commanding attention -- but, whether he's choosing a cover or sculpting an original, he has an ear for a good tune, he knows how to color them effectively, and, especially, he knows how to carry out every kind of groove" and that the work "is distinguished by that casual professionalism, and the album is so comfortable, so easy to enjoy that it can take a few listens to realize how deeply Tench's original songs sink in". In American Songwriter, Hal Horowitz rated this album 3 out of 5 stars, calling it a "humble yet accomplished affair", critiquing that Tench "doesn’t have much of a voice and his songwriting, while adequate, won’t challenge any of [Tom Petty]’s work. But there is a comfortable, deliberate, low key vibe to Tench’s disc that feels lived-in and approachable." Deborah Grabien of No Depression called a Benmont Tench solo album a "dream scenario", she continued that she loved the album and in particular, Tench's vocals.

Meredith Ochs of NPR's All Things Considered stated that "Tench's album feels like pages torn from a journal that's recorded a remarkable life and an exceptional talent". Record Collector's Terry Staunton scored this release 4 out of 5 stars, praising Tench's songwriting and the production from Glyn Johns. Rolling Stone published two reviews: Will Hermes wrote a dedicated piece scoring this album 3 out of 5 stars, calling it "impeccable piano and organ" with "likably understated vocals" and Dave DiMartino characterized it as "a quietly spectacular album" that has "exceedingly well-played, well-produced material with warmth, subtlety and unmistakable character".

== Track listing ==
All songs written by Benmont Tench, except where noted.

1. "Today I Took Your Picture Down" – 4:07
2. "Veronica Said" – 3:49
3. "Ecor Rouge" – 4:23
4. "Hannah" – 3:32
5. "Blonde Girl, Blue Dress" – 3:58
6. "You Should Be so Lucky" – 5:11
7. "Corrina, Corrina" (traditional) – 3:33
8. "Dogwood" – 3:27
9. "Like the Sun (Michoacan)" – 2:27
10. "Wobbles" – 3:31
11. "Why Don't You Quit Leavin Me Alone" – 4:07
12. "Duquesne Whistle" (Bob Dylan, Robert Hunter) – 3:59

Bonus tracks on vinyl edition

13. "She's My Girl Now – 2:07
14. "After All I've Done for You – 4:14

== Personnel ==
Musicians

- Benmont Tench – vocals, acoustic piano, organ, electric guitar (2), acoustic guitar (8)
- Ethan Johns – acoustic guitar (1, 8, 13), electric guitar (2, 4, 6), harmony vocals (2), slide guitar (3), electric 12-string guitar (9), drums (10, 14), shaker (10), Leslie guitar (11), tiple (12, 13)
- Blake Mills – electric guitar (1, 2, 6, 9, 10, 14), subsonic guitar (3), acoustic guitar (8, 13), tiple (10, 13)
- David Rawlings – acoustic guitar (5, 7, 12), harmony vocals (5)
- Gillian Welch – acoustic guitar (5, 7, 12), harmony vocals (5)
- Ryan Adams – acoustic guitar (6), harmony vocals (6)
- Don Was – bass (1, 6, 8–11, 14), upright bass (2–4, 7, 12, 13)
- Tom Petty – bass (5)
- Jeremy Stacey – drums, percussion (1, 2, 6, 8, 9)
- Ringo Starr – tambourine (5)
- Bob Dylan – arrangement (7)
- Joel Jerome – harmony vocals (1, 2)

The Section Quartet – string arrangements and performance (Tracks 3, 4 & 11)

- Richard Dodd – cello
- Lauren Chipman – viola
- Daphne Chen – violin
- Eric Gorfain – violin

=== Production ===
- Don Was – A&R
- Glyn Johns – producer, engineer, mixing
- Morgan Stratton – assistant engineer
- Chris Bellman – LP mastering at Bernie Grundman Mastering (Hollywood, California)
- Bob Ludwig – CD mastering at Gateway Mastering (Portland, Maine)
- Steve Cook – A&R administrator
- Zach Hochkeppel – product manager
- Nicole Frantz – creative direction
- Lawrence Azerrad – art direction, cover illustration
- Julia Brokaw – photography of Joel Jerome
- Sam Jones – cover photography, photo of Ben walking away
- Julia Wick – liner photography
- Oswaldo Rossi – business affairs

== Chart performance ==
You Should Be So Lucky spent two weeks on the Billboard Heatseekers, peaking at 13.

== See also ==
- 2014 in American music
- List of 2014 albums
