= Massive Blur =

Studio album by Melissa Ferrick
- Released: 1993
- Genre: Pop, rock
- Label: Atlantic
- Producer: Gavin MacKillop

Melissa Ferrick chronology
Massive Blur (1993)	Willing to Wait (1995)

Massive Blur is the debut album by the American musician Melissa Ferrick, released in 1993. Ferrick supported the album by opening for Marc Cohn on a North American tour.

The album was a commercial disappointment, prompting Ferrick to release a song, "The Juliana Hatfield Song!", that poked fun at the large gap between her and her friend and labelmate Hatfield's "radio adds".

== Production ==
Recorded in Los Angeles, the album was produced by Gavin MacKillop; Ferrick had considered Lenny Kaye for the job. Peter Holsapple, Susan Cowsill, and Vicki Peterson contributed to Massive Blur.

== Critical reception ==
Professional ratings
Review scores
Source	Rating
AllMusic	3/5 stars
Chicago Tribune	3/4 stars
MusicHound Rock: The Essential Album Guide	3.5/5 stars

Trouser Press opined that Ferrick's "songs are pensive and rocking, direct and oblique, often about relationships but not strictly romantic ones." The Sun Sentinel thought that "these songs read like short stories, strong and complete from first line to final verse." The Chicago Tribune wrote: "A pop belter from Boston, this singer-songwriter's first album delivers the same kind of jolt that came in first hearing Melissa Etheridge's debut disc."

Newsday declared: "Armed with a powerfully dramatic voice and the prudent artistry not to overdo it, Ferrick writes about love and identity and family with piercing honesty and ingenuous uncertainty." The Telegram & Gazette concluded that Ferrick "showcases all her complicated and flighty moods, her spunkiness, smart melodies and the indelible voice that makes her one of the most refreshing singers to appear this year." The Virginian-Pilot noted that "the album kicks off with a killer couple of cuts, the pleading 'Honest Eyes' and 'Happy Song', a nice little rocker." Steve Morse, of The Boston Globe, listed the album as the fifth best of 1993.

AllMusic wrote that the album "showed her to be a convincing, expressive pop/rock vocalist as well as a thoughtful and probing lyricist." Out, in 2000, deemed the album "forgettable folk rock."

== Track listing ==
No.	Title	Length
1.	"Honest Eyes"
2.	"Happy Song"
3.	"Hello Dad"
4.	"What Have I Got to Lose"
5.	"Love Song"
6.	"Ten Friends"
7.	"For Once in My Life"
8.	"Blue Sky Night"
9.	"Massive Blur"
10.	"Take Me All"
11.	"Wonder Why"
12.	"The Meaning of Love"
13.	"In a World Like This"
14.	"Breaking Vows"
