= Falling Off the Sky =

Album by The dB's

Studio album by The dB's
- Released: June 12, 2012
- Genre: Jangle pop
- Length: 48:01
- Label: Bar/None
- Producer: The dB's

The dB's chronology
Paris Avenue (1994)	Falling Off the Sky (2012)

Falling Off the Sky is an album by the dB's, released on June 12, 2012, on Bar/None Records. It is the first album of new material released by the band since 1987.

== Critical reception ==
Professional ratings
Aggregate scores
Source	Rating
Metacritic	73/100
Review scores
Source	Rating
AllMusic	3.5/5 stars
The Boston Globe	(favorable)
Robert Christgau	A−
The Guardian	3/5 stars
Pitchfork	5.7/10

Falling Off the Sky received generally favorable reviews from critics; according to review aggregator website Metacritic, it has a score of 73 out of 100 based on 17 reviews, indicating "generally favorable reviews". Among the most favorable reviews was one written by Robert Christgau, who gave the album an A−. In his review, Christgau described the lead track, "That Time Is Gone", as "as rousing as anything in their [Holsapple and Stamey's] book." A more mixed review by Stephen Deusner stated that on the album, the dB's "don't redefine themselves as defiantly as they once did".

== Track listing ==
No.	Title	Writer(s)	Length
1.	"That Time Is Gone"	Peter Holsapple	3:32
2.	"Before We Were Born"	Chris Stamey	3:48
3.	"The Wonder of Love"	Holsapple	3:46
4.	"Write Back"	Will Rigby	3:40
5.	"Far Away and Long Ago"	Stamey	3:22
6.	"Send Me Something Real"	Stamey	4:45
7.	"World to Cry"	Holsapple	3:31
8.	"The Adventures of Albatross and Doggerel"	Stamey	4:54
9.	"I Didn't Mean to Say That"	Holsapple	3:01
10.	"Collide-oOo-Scope"	Stamey	5:20
11.	"She Won't Drive in the Rain Anymore"	Holsapple, Kristian Bush	5:12
12.	"Remember (Falling Off the Sky)"	Stamey	3:10

== Personnel ==
Personnel taken from Falling Off the Sky liner notes.

The dB's

- Peter Holsapple – vocals, guitar; Wurlitzer piano (2); piano, organ (6); percussion (3)
- Gene Holder – bass guitar
- Chris Stamey – vocals, guitar; organ (1); percussion (9); tubular bells, cello, double bass (10); string and woodwind arrangements
- Will Rigby – drums, percussion, vocals; organ solo (4)

Additional musicians

- Mitch Easter – additional guitars (2, 3, 10), guitar solo (12), percussion (10)
- Charles Cleaver – Wurlitzer piano (2, 8, 10), piano (11)
- Brannon Bollinger – baritone saxophones (2)
- Brett Harris – backing vocals (2, 4, 8–11)
- Al Strong – trumpet (3)
- Peter Lamb – saxophone (3)
- Jeff Crawford – backing vocals (4, 8–11)
- Karen Galvin – violin (4, 5, 8, 10, 11)
- Kaitlin Wolfberg – violin (4, 5, 8, 10, 11)
- Josh Starmer – cello (4–6, 8, 10, 11)
- Gabriel Pelli – violin (6)
- Laura Thomas – violin (6, 7)
- Lisa Lachot – flute (6, 8)
- Emma Nadeau – French Horn (6)
- Corey Sims – trumpet (8)
- Dale Baker – percussion (10)

Technical personnel

- The dB's – production
- Mitch Easter – additional production, mixing (3, 8)
- Scott Litt – additional production, mixing (1, 9)
- Ian Schreier – mixing (2, 10, 12)
- Tim Harper – mixing (11)
- Chris Stamey – mixing (4–7)
- Greg Calbi – mastering at Sterling Sound
