= Alice Carbone Tench =

American author and culinary entrepreneur

- Born: Italy
- Education: University of Turin
- Occupation: Author
- Spouse: Benmont Tench (m. 2015)
- Children: 1
- Website: alicecarbone.com

Alice Carbone Tench is an Italian-born writer and culinary entrepreneur based in Los Angeles. She was born January 25, 1982.

== Career ==
In 2010, after graduating from college in Foreign Languages and Literatures from the University of Turin (Italy), and after working as a translator and interpreter in her hometown of Avigliana (Turin, Italy), she moved to Los Angeles. Shortly after her arrival, she began her career as a journalist and foreign correspondent for several Italian magazines, including Vanity Fair, the Italian news agency ANSA and the online magazine Fine Dining Lovers.

In 2011, she started a blog, Wonderland Mag, to share her American experience with friends and family in Italy. The blog evolved into source material for a book.

In 2012, she had a life-changing meeting with Leonard Cohen with whom she soon shared a manager; the two sponsored her for an O-1B artist visa so that she could write in America. Her debut novel, The Sex Girl, was published by Rare Bird Books in July 2015.

From 2013 to 2015, she hosted the interview podcast Coffee with Alice that featured guests such as Benmont Tench, Jackson Browne, Moby, Bill Pullman, Janet Fitch, Mike Campbell, Phil Hendrie, and many more. Carbone Tench interviewed George Christie, one of the most notorious and controversial figures in the Hells Angels.

After receiving numerous rejections from publishing agents, Carbone Tench chose to expand her focus beyond traditional publishing and pursue a different direction in her career. This led to the creation of Instagram to Table, a platform that combines blogging, conversations, entertainment, and inspiration, as well as Instagram live stories, to connect through the lens of food.

In the summer of 2019, Carbone Tench began to develop a format to bring Making Sense of Reality to television, radio, and live venues, and during the process she increasingly turned to food and cooking as a medium to express the need for community, her Italian heritage, and a sense of culinary self-care that helped her heal from her eating disorder and find her natural way of communicating.

Alice's cookbook-memoir "Eating Again, The Recipes that Healed Me" published in February 2022 with Heliotrope Books. The book earned a "PW Picks Book of the Week" from industry trade publication Publishers Weekly, which called the book a "stellar debut."

In 2023, she launched The Italian Cookie, an organic, vegan, and gluten-free cookie mix company that only uses fresh and sustainable organic flours by farmers who work to preserve heirloom grains, like Anson Mills.

== Media appearances ==
Carbone Tench was featured on Vogue Italia on June 23, 2015), in an article about strong women who leave their native country to follow a dream.

She was interviewed for The Huffington Post by David Henry Sterry on July 30, 2015, discussing her debut novel, her writing process in her second language, and her journey of recovery.

More recently, she was a guest on KTLA Channel 5, One Green Planet to discuss her cookbook memoir, Eating Again.

== Personal life ==
She lives in Los Angeles with her husband Benmont Tench (keyboardist and founding member of Tom Petty and The Heartbreakers) and their daughter, Catherine Gabriella Winter.

Carbone has publicly discussed her history of eating disorders, depression, alcoholism and drug addiction. She is an advocate for recovery and empowering women to be comfortable in their bodies, and find their worth away from the mirror.
