= Melissa Ferrick =

American musician

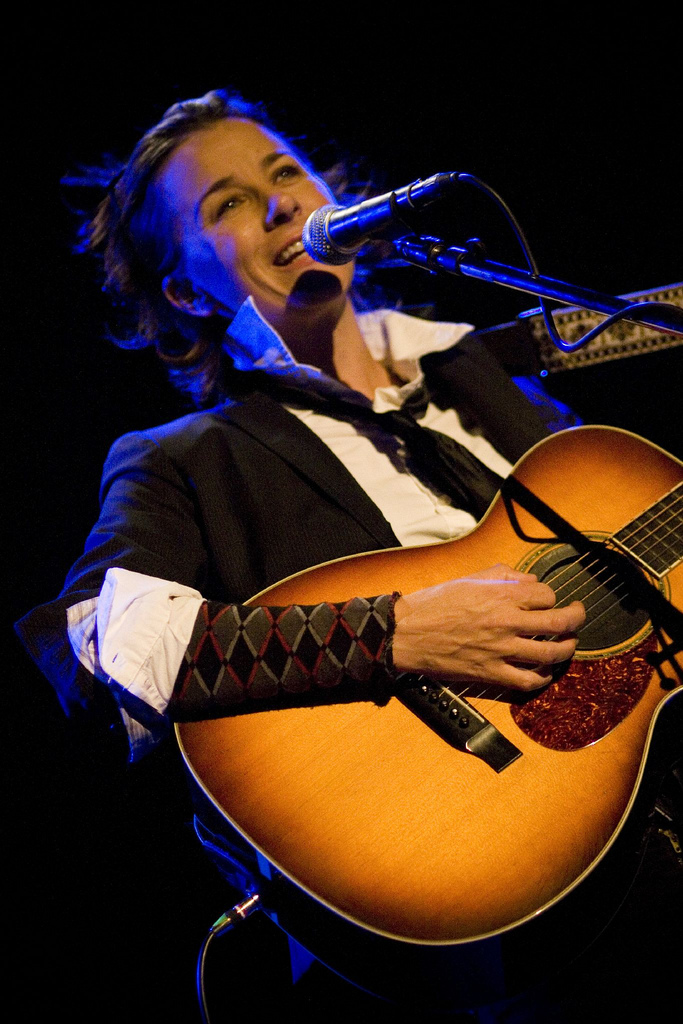
- Melissa Ferrick performing on September 10, 2008

Background information
- Origin: Ipswich, Massachusetts, United States
- Genres: Folk-rock
- Occupation: Singer-songwriter
- Instruments: Guitar, vocals
- Years active: 1991–present
- Labels: Atlantic Records; What Are Records? Right On Records; MPress Records
- Website: www.melissaferrick.com

Melissa Ferrick is an American singer-songwriter. She is a music professor at Northeastern University and Berklee College of Music.

== Early life ==
Ferrick was raised in Ipswich, Massachusetts. Her father John was a public school teacher who also managed several free-jazz bands. As a child, Ferrick would often accompany her father to clubs on Boston's North Shore to watch the bands play. She began taking classical violin lessons at the age of five, and later, piano. In elementary and junior high school, she learned the trumpet and bass. Altogether, she received 15 years of formal music training, including two years at Berklee College of Music. She dropped out in 1990 to pursue a music career.

== Career ==
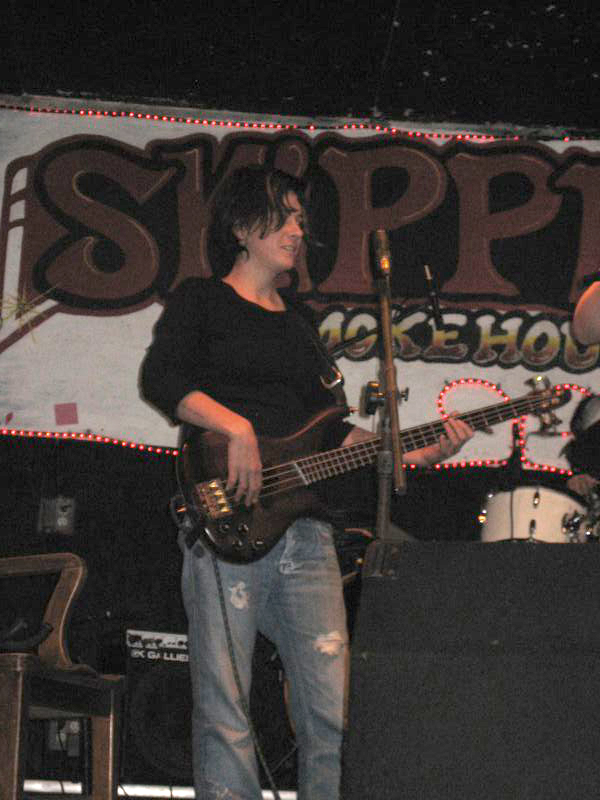
Ferrick playing bass guitar in 2006

Ferrick began her career singing and playing in coffeehouses in the East Village, New York City. She received a great deal of publicity in 1991 when she replaced, at the last minute, the opening act for the singer Morrissey on tour. She was subsequently signed to a recording contract with Atlantic Records and released her first two albums, Massive Blur, in 1993 and Willing to Wait, in 1995.

In 1996, Ferrick experienced what she described as "bottomed out" on alcohol. Following her recovery, she returned to music, signing with the indie label What Are Records?. Ferrick released three albums on the label; Made of Honor, Everything I Need, and Freedom, the latter inspired by Janet Jackson's The Velvet Rope. Her 1998 album Everything I Need was nominated for Album of the Year by the Gay & Lesbian American Music Awards (GLAMA).

In 2000, Ferrick founded her own record label, Right On Records. The first studio album released on her own label was Skinnier Faster Live at the B.P.C..

In the Eyes of Strangers, released in October 2006, was the sixth album released on Right On Records. Ferrick partially financed the recording costs with song sales via her website. Her fourteenth album, Goodbye Youth, was released September 2008. In Spring 2010, she released an album of cover songs called Enough About Me. In 2011, she released the album Still Right Here featuring original songs.

During live performances, Ferrick mostly self-accompanies on a Collings OM3 SB acoustic guitar. She has also experimented with loop pedals and a range of accompaniments, including, in particular, brass instruments.

Ferrick's rigorous touring schedule generally includes more than 150 shows per year. She played solo gigs in small to medium-sized clubs and numerous festivals, as well as larger venues accompanied by a band. In 2007, she performed at the Michigan Womyn's Music Festival, and opened for Ani Difranco. Her song "Drive" from the Freedom album became popularly known as a "lesbian anthem".

In 2017, Spotify settled a class action lawsuit initiated by Ferrick and David Lowery who had alleged the company failed to pay proper royalties to musicians whose songs were streamed on the service. Spotify set aside US$43 million to compensate musicians, songwriters and publishers.

Her musical inspirations include Bruce Springsteen, The Pretenders, Rickie Lee Jones, Paul Simon, Earth Wind and Fire, Tori Amos, Radiohead, Dave Matthews, and Joan Armatrading.

== Personal life ==
Ferrick is queer and gender-nonconforming. In 2021, she said, "I feel pretty genderless, but I don’t feel sad about it. I love the body I’m in. I don’t want to totally let go of 'she' because I love the experiences I’ve had as a woman. It feels powerful, but so does 'they'".

== Discography ==
- 1993 – Massive Blur
- 1995 – Willing to Wait
- 1996 – Made of Honor
- 1997 – Melissa Ferrick +1 (live)
- 1998 – Everything I Need
- 2000 – Freedom
- 2001 – Skinnier, Faster, Live at the B.P.C. (live)
- 2001 – Valentine Heartache
- 2002 – Listen Hard
- 2003 – 70 People at 7000 Feet (live)
- 2004 – The Other Side
- 2006 – In the Eyes of Strangers
- 2006 – Decade (video)
- 2007 – Live at Union Hall (live)
- 2008 – Goodbye Youth
- 2010 – Enough About Me
- 2011 – Still Right Here
- 2013 – The Truth Is
- 2015 – Melissa Ferrick
