= The Shams =

US musical trio

The Shams were an all-female New York folk pop trio in the 1980s and early 1990s, featuring Amy McMahon Rigby, Sue Garner, and Amanda Uprichard. Some critics have credited the band with pioneering elements of what would later become known as the Americana and No Depression movements in American music. Others have described them as "queens of urban folkdom" or "riot grrrls unplugged." Punk rock musician Richard Hell has labeled their music "beauty parlor soul."

Rigby, Garner, and Uprichard began performing together in the early 1980s in a band called the Last Roundup, a period in which they also sang Christmas carols together at parties and outside friends' homes. They all held day jobs when they formed The Shams, but they soon found themselves performing with musicians such as the Indigo Girls, Soul Asylum and Buffalo Tom.

The name "The Shams" is a partial reference to the "outsider music" group The Shaggs, an all-female band whose lack of training and unusual melodies have prompted some critics to label them the worst band ever. "In our early days, people often compared us to the Shaggs, and we didn't have a name, so we decided on the Shams," Rigby told the Chicago Tribune in 1992. The name also refers to the American vocal group The Tams.

The Shams released the single "Only a Dream"/"3 A.M." on musician Bob Mould's Singles Only Label in 1990, followed by the 1991 album Quilt from Matador Records and the 1993 three-song EP Sedusia.

Garner, and especially Rigby, have since gone on to notable solo careers.

== Discography ==
- Only a Dream/3 A.M. (Singles Only single, 1990)
- Quilt (Matador, 1991)
- Sedusia (Matador EP, 1993)
