= Out of My Way =

Studio album by Peter Holsapple
- Released: 1997
- Genre: Alternative rock
- Length: 39:21
- Label: Monkey Hill
- Producer: Peter Holsapple

Peter Holsapple chronology
Out of My Way (1997)	Game Day (2018)

Out of My Way is the solo debut album by the American musician Peter Holsapple, released in 1997 on the New Orleans label Monkey Hill. The personnel includes keyboardist Benmont Tench and Holsapple's fellow Continental Drifters Vicki Peterson and Susan Cowsill.

== Critical reception ==
Billboard deemed the album "a delightfully varied and distinctively played work that combines the rootsy elements of the Continental Drifters' sound with the pop-rock influences that have served Holsapple well throughout his career." Stereo Review concluded: "Sometimes cranky, sometimes despairing, and always doggedly hopeful, Out of My Way is some of the most tuneful catharsis around."

AllMusic's editors gave the album four out of five stars, praising wordplay in the lyrics and the bass guitar instrumentation.

== Track listing ==
1. "I Been There" – 3:47
2. "No Sound" – 4:02
3. "Away with Love" – 3:47
4. "Pretty, Damned, Smart" – 3:34
5. "Couldn't Stop Lying to You" – 4:28
6. "Out of My Way" – 3:09
7. "Shirley" – 3:48
8. "Meet Me in the Middle" – 3:44
9. "I Am a Tree" – 2:37
10. "Don't Worry About John" – 2:15
11. "Here and Now" – 4:10

== Personnel ==
- Peter Holsapple
- Musicians: Benmont Tench, Carlo Nuccio, Ilene Markell, Rob Savoy, Robert Johnston, Susan Cowsill, Vicki Peterson
