= The Sound of Music (The dB's album) =

Studio album by The dB's
- Released: 1987
- Studio: Quad Penthouse, NYC
- Genre: Power pop, alternative rock
- Length: 44:46
- Label: I.R.S.
- Producer: Greg Edward

The dB's chronology
Like This (1984)	The Sound of Music (1987)	Ride the Wild Tom-Tom (1993)

Professional ratings
Review scores
Source	Rating
AllMusic	3/5 stars
Robert Christgau	B
The Encyclopedia of Popular Music	3/5 stars
MusicHound Rock: The Essential Album Guide	3.5/5 stars
The Rolling Stone Album Guide	3.5/5 stars
Spin Alternative Record Guide	6/10

The Sound of Music is an album by American power pop group The dB's, released in 1987 on I.R.S. Records.

The album peaked at No. 171 on the Billboard 200.

All songs were written by Peter Holsapple with the exception of "Feel Alright," which is a cover of a Cargoe song.

== Production ==
The Sound of Music was produced by Greg Edward. Van Dyke Parks and Benmont Tench contributed piano, organ, and synthesizer to the album.

== Critical reception ==
Trouser Press wrote: "The Sound of Music finds the dB’s continuing in the style of Like This, with similarly fine results. The country elements reappear on 'Bonneville' (complete with fiddles and mandolins), 'Never Before and Never Again' (a brilliant [Peter] Holsapple duet with Syd Straw) and 'Looked at the Sun Too Long,' which could easily be mistaken for a Gram Parsons tune." The Washington Post wrote that "without the counterpoint provided by [Chris] Stamey's more adventurous songs, Holsapple's full-bodied but conventional tunes have drifted toward the insipid." The Rolling Stone Album Guide called the album "polished" but "not entirely convincing." The Spin Alternative Record Guide called it "catchy but complacent."

== Track listing ==
1. "Never Say When"
2. "Change with the Changing Times"
3. "I Lie"
4. "Molly Says"
5. "Bonneville"
6. "Any Old Thing"
7. "Think Too Hard"
8. "Working for Somebody Else"
9. "Never Before and Never Again"
10. "A Better Place"
11. "Looked at the Sun Too Long"
12. "Today Could Be the Day"

CD bonus tracks

13. "Feel Alright"
14. "Sharon"

== Lineup ==
- Peter Holsapple - lead vocals, rhythm guitar, mandolin
- Gene Holder - lead guitar
- Will Rigby - drums, backing vocals
- Jeff Beninato - bass, backing vocals

== Guest Musicians ==
- Benmont Tench - organ, synthesizers
- Jane Scarpantoni - cello
- Jeremy Smith - French horn
- Van Dyke Parks - piano, synthesizers
- Lisa Germano - violin
- Syd Straw - co-lead vocals on "Never Before and Never Again"

== Technical ==
- Greg Edward - producer, mixer
- Jeff Poe - assistant mixer
- Dave Wolk - engineer
- Spike Wolk - engineer
- Andy Udoff - assistant engineer
- Stephen Marcussen - mastering
