= Stephanie Chernikowski =

American photographer and writer (1941–2026)

Stephanie Chernikowski (1941–2026) was an American photographer and writer. She documented the New York City punk and new wave scenes of the 1970s and 1980s.
