= Chris Stamey =

American musician, singer, songwriter

- Born: December 6, 1954 (age 71); Chapel Hill, North Carolina, United States
- Genres: Rock, power pop, jangle pop
- Occupations: Musician; singer; songwriter; record producer
- Instruments: Guitar; bass guitar; trumpet; piano; vocals
- Years active: 1977–present
- Labels: Car; DB Records; A&M; New Rose; Yep Roc
- Website: chrisstamey.com

Christopher Charles Stamey (born December 6, 1954) is an American musician, singer, songwriter, and record producer. After a brief time playing with Alex Chilton, as well as Mitch Easter under the name Sneakers, Stamey formed the dB's with Peter Holsapple.

== Early life ==
Stamey was born in Chapel Hill, North Carolina, United States. He grew up in Winston-Salem, North Carolina, and graduated from R. J. Reynolds High School. He attended the University of North Carolina before transferring to New York University, where he graduated with a degree in philosophy.

== Career ==
After moving from Chapel Hill to New York City, Stamey played with the Erasers, then as Alex Chilton's bass player.

In 1977, Stamey founded the independent New York City record label Car Records, which released the 1978 Chris Bell single with the tracks "I Am the Cosmos" and "You and Your Sister".

Stamey recorded and released two critically acclaimed albums with The dB's, Stands for Decibels (1981) and Repercussion (1982), which were initially released only in the UK, before leaving the band to pursue a solo career.

In 1991, Stamey and Holsapple reunited to record the album, Mavericks, which led to live concerts in London, England.

In 1996, Stamey moved back to Chapel Hill, North Carolina, and opened the recording studio, Modern Recording, with former dB's producer Scott Litt. He has worked as a producer and sound engineer for various artists and recording projects including those by the alternative country group Whiskeytown.

In 2004, Stamey released the album Travels in the South, quickly followed by V.O.T.E. 2004, enlarged as 2005's A Question of Temperature featuring the group Yo La Tengo as the album's backing musicians.

In July 2009, Stamey and Holsapple released their second album as a duo entitled Here and Now, which was promoted by a follow-up concert tour.

In 2012, Stamey reunited with the dB's to complete Falling Off the Sky, their first new studio album in 25 years and their first in 30 years with the original 1978 line-up.

On February 5, 2013, Stamey released the solo album Lovesick Blues on Yep Roc Records, followed by Euphoria in 2015.

Stamey was the driving force behind a group of musician-friends performing Big Star's Third album live in the US, the UK, Spain, and Australia, on a series of occasions between 2010 and 2016, resulting in a live double CD/DVD recorded at Glendale's Alex Theatre in 2016 and released in 2017. On the record, he performs vocals and guitar on I Am the Cosmos, the Chris Bell single he had released on his Car Records label some 40-odd years earlier.

On June 12, 2021 (Record Store Day), Stamey and Holsapple released Our Back Pages on Omnivore, an album of acoustic arrangements of songs by The dB’s.

== Discography ==
=== Solo albums ===
- 1982: It's a Wonderful Life (DB records)
- 1987: It's Alright (A&M)
- 1991: Fireworks (Rhino New Artists)
- 2004: Travels in the South (Yep Roc)
- 2004: The Speed of Sound (Yep Roc)
- 2013: Lovesick Blues (Yep Roc)
- 2015: Euphoria (Yep Roc)
- 2019: New Songs For The 20th Century w the Modrec Orchestra (Omnivore Recordings)
- 2020: A Brand-New Shade of Blue w the Fellow Travelers (Omnivore Recordings)
- 2023: The Great Escape (Schoolkids)
- 2025: Anything is Possible (Label 51)

=== Singles ===
- 1977: "The Summer Sun" (Ork Records)
- 1983: "Winter of Love" (Albion)
- 1987: "Cara Lee" (A&M)
- 1992: "On the Radio" (Intercord)
- 1993: "Alive" (Singles Only)
- 1994: "Let It Be Me" (Car Records)
- 2018: "Greensboro Days" (ShangMoto Songs BMI)

=== EPs ===
- 1984: Instant Excitement (Coyote)

=== As a member of the dB's ===
- 1981: Stands for Decibels (Albion)
- 1983: Repercussion (Albion)
- 2012: Falling Off the Sky (BarNone)
- 2021: I Thought You Wanted to Know 1979-1981 (Propeller Sound Recordings)

=== As Chris Stamey and Friends ===
- 1993: Christmas Time various artists (East Side Records)
- 2015: Christmas Time Again various artists (Omnivore Recordings)

=== As the Chris Stamey Experience ===
- 2004: A Question of Temperature (Yep Roc)

=== With Kirk Ross ===
- 1995: The Robust Beauty of Improper Linear Models in Decision Making (East Side Digital)
- 2021: The Robust Beauty of Improper Linear Models in Decision Making Remastered Editions, Vol. I, II (Modern Recording)

=== With Peter Holsapple ===
Albums

- 1991: Mavericks (New Rose)
- 2009: Here and Now (Yep Roc)
- 2021: Our Back Pages (Omnivore Recordings)

Singles

- 1991: "Angels" (New Rose)
- 2009: "My Friend the Sun" (BarNone)
- 2009: "Live at Euclid" (Euclid Records)

=== With Yo La Tengo ===
- 2004: V.O.T.E. (Yep Roc); reissued and expanded as A Question of Temperature in 2004

=== As producer ===
- 1983: Pylon – Chomp (DB Records)
- 1990: Peter Blegvad – King Strut and Other Stories (Silvertone)
- 1995: Whiskeytown – Faithless Street (Outpost)
- 1997: Whiskeytown – Strangers Almanac (Outpost)
- 1998: Myra Holder – Four Mile Road (Coyote)
- 1998: Flat Duo Jets – Lucky Eye (Outpost)
- 1999: Le Tigre – Le Tigre (Mr. Lady)
- 1999: The Butchies – Population: 1975 (Mr. Lady)
- 2000: Sue Garner & Rick Brown – Still (Thrill Jockey)
- 2001: Alejandro Escovedo – A Man Under the Influence (Bloodshot)
- 2001: Hazeldine – Double Back (Glitterhouse)
- 2001: Le Tigre – Feminist Sweepstakes (Mr. Lady)
- 2002: The Mayflies USA – Summertown (Yep Roc)
- 2003: Caitlin Cary – I'm Staying Out (Yep Roc)
- 2004: Tres Chicas – Sweetwater (Yep Roc)

=== As contributing musician ===
- 1989: Syd Straw – Surprise (Virgin)
- 1985: The Golden Palominos – Visions of Excess (Celluloid)
- 1986: The Golden Palominos – Blast of Silence (Axed My Baby for a Nickel) (Celluloid)
- 1992: Freedy Johnston – Can You Fly (BarNone))
- 2015: Alex Chilton – Ocean Club '77 (Norton)

=== As contributing musician and co-producer ===
- 2017: Thank You, Friends: Big Star's Third Live...And More (Concord Bicycle Music)
