= The dB's =

American rock band

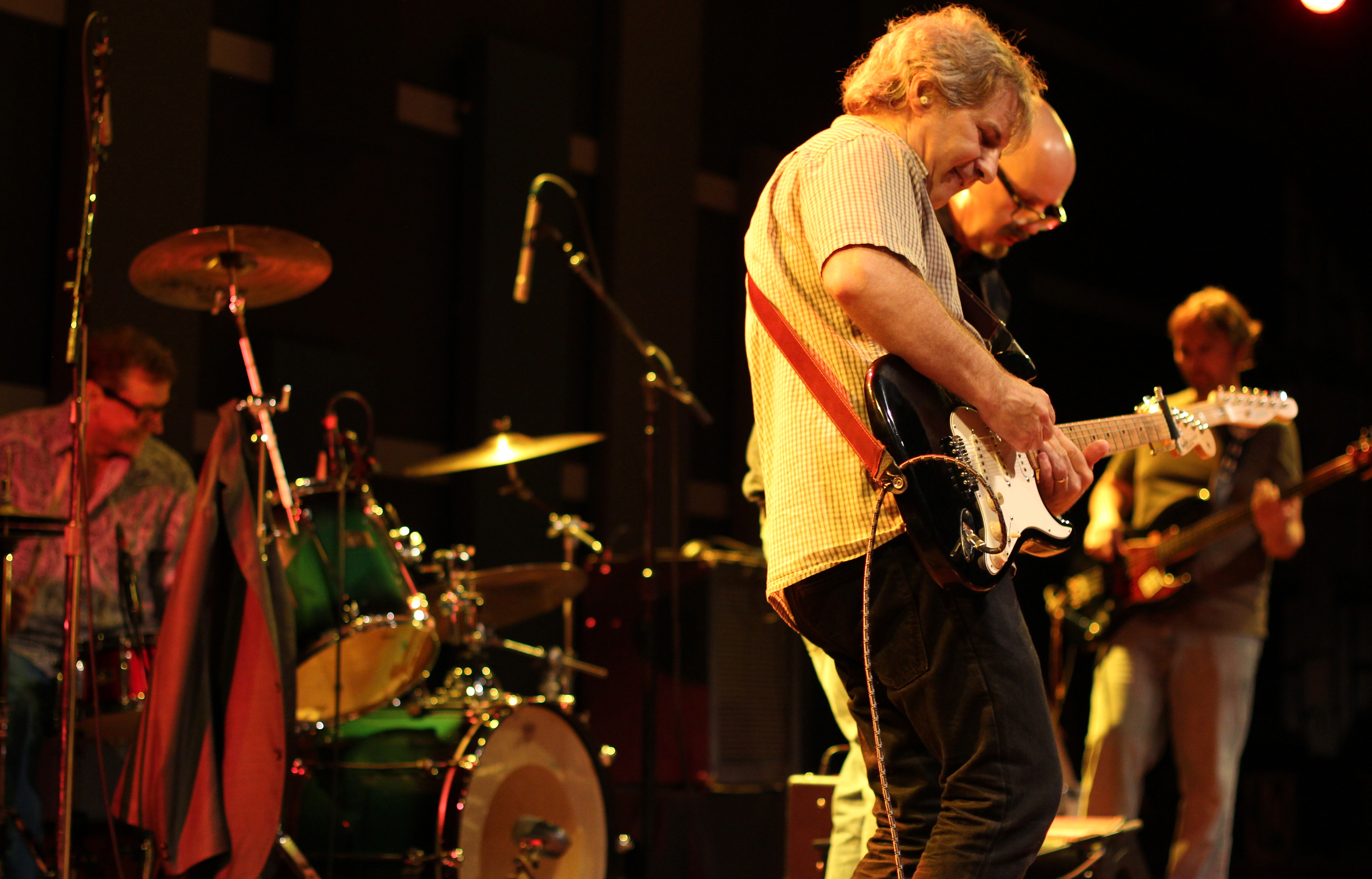
- The dB's performing in New York on December 6, 2007

Background information
- Origin: New York City
- Genres: Jangle pop; power pop; college rock; indie rock
- Years active: 1978–1988, 2005–present
- Labels: Albion; Bearsville; I.R.S. Rhino; Monkey Hill; Bar/None; Propeller Sound Recordings
- Members: Peter Holsapple; Chris Stamey; Will Rigby; Gene Holder
- Past members: Rick Wagner; Jeff Beninato; Eric Peterson
- Website: thedbs.com

The dB's are an American alternative rock and power pop group, who formed in New York City in 1978 and first came to prominence in the early 1980s. Their debut album Stands for Decibels is acclaimed as one of the great "lost" power pop albums of the 1980s.

The band members are Peter Holsapple, Chris Stamey, Will Rigby, and Gene Holder. Although the members are all from Winston-Salem, North Carolina, the group was formed in New York City in 1978. In 2012, the band completed its first new studio album in 25 years and its first in 30 years with the original lineup.

== History ==
During 1977, Stamey played bass with Alex Chilton in New York, and recorded "(I Thought) You Wanted to Know" with Television guitarist Richard Lloyd. A single of the latter song, backed with "If and When" (on which Rigby and Holder played), was issued in 1978, credited to Chris Stamey and the dB's.

Holsapple joined the group in October 1978, after moving to New York City from North Carolina. Their single "Black and White" was issued by Shake Records in 1980.

British label Albion Records released their first album Stands for Decibels in January 1981 to critical acclaim but negligible sales.

According to Trouser Press, the group drew from 1960s pop and psychedelia as well as 1970s pop groups like Big Star, but the songs by composers Stamey and Holsapple were too distinctive to merely copy their sources of inspiration. While Holsapple was skilled in the composing of fairly conventional tunes such as "Big Brown Eyes" and "Bad Reputation," Stamey's songs, such as "Espionage" and "Tearjerkin'," tended to be somewhat more experimental and quirky.

They released a second album on Albion in 1981, Repercussion, and also released singles such as "Judy." These two albums were later reissued on one compact disc.

Stamey left the group after the second album, and pursued a career as a solo artist and producer. The group then recorded the album Like This, released in 1984. The band signed an American record deal with Bearsville Records, but distribution problems caused the album to be delayed, and Bearsville folded the same year. Rick Wagner joined the band on bass, and Holder moved to lead guitar.

The Sound of Music, their last album before their breakup, was released on I.R.S. Records in 1987 with New Orleans bass player Jeff Beninato, founder of the New Orleans Musicians Relief Fund. The album reached the Billboard 200, peaking at No. 171. Beninato participated in the subsequent tour. Holder left the band to join the Individuals, and Eric Peterson was recruited on lead guitar after replacing temporary guitarist/keyboardist Harold Kelt. "[The Sound of Music] has been out of print since 1988," said Peter Holsapple in 2022. "I.R.S. then rejected all the demos for a second album on the label, and I ended the band after a show in Florida." In 2017, Holsapple said: "Somehow we've gone from great white hope to also-ran to godfathers of power pop, all without selling a whole lot of records. There were some cities where we felt like we were kind of a big deal. In Chicago we got a lot of radio play on WXRT and we could sell out the clubs there, but take us to Bloomington, Indiana, and nobody knew who we were."

Several albums were released after the dB's broke up. Line Records compiled Stands for Decibels and Repercussion with the addition of two bonus tracks, first in 1992 as dB's First/ Repercussion, then in 1999 as Neverland. Ride the Wild Tom-Tom, released in 1993 by Rhino Records, collected demos, early recordings, and singles. Paris Avenue, issued in 1994 by Monkey Hill Records, was a posthumous album by the final line-up, based on demo tapes from the band's waning days.

== Other projects ==
Following the dB's breakup, Holsapple worked as a sideman, serving as a full-time auxiliary guitarist and keyboardist for R.E.M. for four years, beginning with the Green world tour and continuing through the 1991 Out of Time album. After finishing working with R.E.M., he toured with Hootie and the Blowfish and then joined the Continental Drifters. He has toured and recorded with The Paranoid Style since 2024. He has released three solo albums, 1997's Out of My Way, followed by Game Day (2018) and The Face of 68 (2025).

Stamey has released six solo records and has worked as a record producer. In 1985, the Christmas Time holiday-themed mini-album was issued by Coyote Records, credited to "Chris Stamey Group with Special Guests the dB's". It was expanded to a 17-song CD in 1993, retitled Christmas Time Again and featuring contributions from Mitch Easter, Ryan Adams, Marshall Crenshaw, Don Dixon, and others, and then again as a 21-song CD in November 2006.

Rigby played drums for Steve Earle and others, and Holder continued to record and produce.

In 1991, Stamey and Holsapple reunited (not under the dB's moniker) as a duo to record an album titled Mavericks.

== Reunion ==
The classic lineup of the dB's reunited in 2005 and performed two shows in Chicago and two in Hoboken, New Jersey.

Also in 2005, the band recorded a cover version of the 1966 song "What Becomes of the Brokenhearted" to benefit the New Orleans Musicians' Relief Fund.

Bowery Ballroom in NYC hosted the dB's in January 2007, and in February 2007, the band performed at Cat's Cradle in Carrboro, North Carolina.

In March 2012, Holsapple, Stamey, Rigby, and Mitch Easter (substituting for Holder) played at South by Southwest.

Falling Off the Sky was released in June 2012 by Bar/None Records.

== Members ==
Current

- Peter Holsapple – guitar, vocals, keyboards (1978–1988, 2005–present)
- Chris Stamey – guitar, vocals (1978–1982, 2005–present)
- Gene Holder – bass guitar (1978–1984, 2005–present), guitar (1983–1987)
- Will Rigby – drums, backing and occasional lead vocals (1978–1988, 2005–present)

Former

- Eric Peterson – guitar (1988)
- Rick Wagner – bass guitar (1984–1985)
- Jeff Beninato – bass guitar, backing and occasional lead vocals (1985–1988)

Touring

- Harold Kelt – guitar, keyboards (1987)
- Mitch Easter – bass guitar (2012; substitute for Holder)

== Discography ==
=== Studio albums ===
- Stands for Decibels (1981, Albion Records)
- Repercussion (1981, Albion Records)
- Like This (1984, Bearsville Records)
- The Sound of Music (1987, I.R.S. Records)
- Paris Avenue (1994, Monkey Hill Records)
- Falling Off the Sky (2012, Bar/None Records)

=== EPs ===
- Amplifier (1981, Albion Records)
- Revolution of the Mind (2013, Orange Sound)

=== Singles ===
- "(I Thought) You Wanted to Know" as Chris Stamey & the dB's (1978, Car Records)
- "Black and White" (1980, Shake Records)
- "Dynamite" (1981, Albion Records)
- "Big Brown Eyes" (1981, Albion Records)
- "Judy" (1981, Albion Records)
- "Neverland" (1982, Albion Records)
- "Living a Lie" (1982, Albion Records)
- "Love Is for Lovers" (1984, Bearsville Records)
- "I Lie" (1987, I.R.S. Records)
- "Picture Sleeve" (2011, Orange Sound)
- "Bad Reputation (New York Rocker Sessions)" (2021, Propeller Sound Recordings)
- "Tell Me Two Times (New York Rocker Sessions)" (2021, Propeller Sound Recordings)

=== Compilation albums ===
- Amplifier (1986, Dojo Records)
- dB's First/ Repercussion (1992, Line Records)
- Ride the Wild Tom-Tom (1993, Rhino Records)
- Neverland (1999, Line Records)
- I Thought You Wanted to Know: 1978-1981 (2021, Propeller Sound Recordings)
