= The Cowsills (1967 album) =

Studio album by The Cowsills
- Released: 1967
- Studio: A&R Recording Studios, New York City
- Genre: Sunshine pop
- Length: 30:47
- Label: MGM Records
- Producer: Artie Kornfeld

The Cowsills chronology
The Cowsills (1967)	We Can Fly (1968)

The Cowsills is the debut album by American family pop group the Cowsills. The first single from the album was "The Rain, the Park & Other Things", which reached No. 2 on the Billboard pop chart.

Similar to the AM pop and sunshine pop-style music of the time, made popular by groups such as the Mamas & the Papas, Tommy Boyce and Bobby Hart and the Monkees, the Cowsills who are an actual family, produced family-friendly music in this style.

== Reception ==
Professional ratings
Review scores
Source	Rating
AllMusic	3/5 stars

In his review for AllMusic, Bruce Eder wrote: "Echoes of the prettier and less daring parts of Revolver and Sgt. Pepper's abound in the best of the harmonizing here, and also in some of the brass and percussion, and the guitar flourishes on numbers like 'Pennies' (which could easily have been a hit)".

== Track listing ==
=== Side 1 ===
1. "The Rain, the Park & Other Things" – 3:04
2. "Pennies" – 2:52
3. "La Rue Du Soleil" – 2:46
4. "Thinkin' About the Other Side" – 2:06
5. "Dreams of Linda" – 2:46
6. "River Blue" – 2:57

=== Side 2 ===
1. "Gettin' into That Sunny, Sunny Feelin' Again" – 2:31
2. "That's My Time of the Day" – 2:25
3. "Troubled Roses" – 2:11
4. "(Stop, Look) Is Anyone There?" – 2:35
5. "How Can I Make You See" – 2:16
6. "(Come 'Round Here) I'm the One You Need" – 2:18

=== Razor & Tie bonus tracks ===
13. "Love American Style" Margolin, Fox
14. "The Impossible Years" (Medress, Margo, Margo, Siegel)

=== Now Sounds, April 7, 2015 release bonus tracks ===
13. "The Rain, the Park and Other Things" (Mono 45)
14. "River Blue" (Mono 45)
15. "Most of All"
16. "Siamese Cat"
17. "Party Girl"
18. "What's It Gonna Be Like"
19. "A Most Peculiar Man"
20. "Could It Be, Let Me Know"

== Personnel ==
The Cowsills

- Mom (Barbara) – vocals
- Barry – bass, vocals
- Bill – guitar, vocals
- Bob – guitar, vocals
- John – drums, vocals

Technical

- Arranged by Jimmy "Wiz" Wisner (tracks 1 to 12), Charles Calello (track 14 Razor & Tie Version)
- Produced by Artie Kornfeld

== Charts ==
Chart performance for The Cowsills
Chart (1968)	Peak position
US Billboard 200	31
