= Blue Northern =

Canadian country rock band

- Origin: Vancouver, British Columbia, Canada
- Genres: Country rock
- Years active: 1977-1982
- Labels: Quintessence Records, Polydor Records
- Members: Jimmy Wilson; Gary Comeau; Lee Stephens; Brady Gustafson; Larry McGillivray; Ray O'Toole; Billy Cowsill

Blue Northern was a country rock band active between 1977 and 1982. They released four Top 40 singles in Canada; in their final year they were nominated for a Canadian Country Music Award.

== History ==
Blue Northern was formed in Vancouver, British Columbia in 1977. Its initial composition was Gary Comeau (lead guitar and violin), Lee Stephens (bass), Brady Gustafson (drums), and Jimmy Wilson (formerly of Cement City Cowboys) on rhythm guitar, Dobro, pedal steel guitar and accordion. They were joined by guitarist Ray O'Toole and vocalist, guitarist and percussionist Billy Cowsill. O'Toole had been a professional musician and songwriter since 1967, co-founding The Northwest Company in that year and remaining with the band for various periods between 1967 and 1974. Cowsill had been a professional musician for all of his life, and achieved international success with his family, The Cowsills, in the 1960s.

Blue Northern's first release, Blue, was a four-song EP released in 1979 on Quintessence Records. Two of the songs were written by O'Toole and two by Cowsill. The record was produced by Cowsill.

Polydor Records signed the band in 1980 and released "Can't Make No Sense", from Blue, as a single. Written by O'Toole, it did well on radio nationally, spending 9 weeks on the Vancouver charts, peaking at No 10. This was followed by the release of an eponymous first album in 1981, from which four further singles were released, three of which also were Top 40 singles. All were written by O'Toole. The album was co-produced by Cowsill, O'Toole and Wilson.

In 1982, Blue Northern was nominated for a Canadian Country Music Award. That year, the band recorded the 1983 album Restless Heart by the Winnipeg country singer Patti Mayo, which Cowsill produced. Gustafson left the band and was replaced by Larry McGillivray. But by then, Cowsill's substance abuse had become an issue and he departed in January 1982. Lee Stephens left the group at that time as well, and by March 1982 Ray O'Toole announced his departure. The band took a swift change in musical direction, primarily catering to country bars that they were performing in at the time and incorporated much of Comeau's western swing style originals into the repertoire and also placing him in the forefront on vocals for the last part of 1982. Their last performance was as part of a Christmas concert at Vancouver's Commodore Ballroom on December 23, 1982.

O'Toole then joined the bands Alibi and Shakedown. Gustafson joined The Rhythm & Blues Allstars. Comeau became a session musician, and leads several bands in Vancouver, focusing on New Orleans-style music. Wilson returned to his native Oklahoma, and later appeared as a member of Robbie Robertson & The Red Road Ensemble, on the Grammy-winning album Music for The Native Americans (and its accompanying Emmy-winning PBS documentary Making A Noise: A Native American Journey). Cowsill co-founded The Blue Shadows and The Co-Dependents; he died in 2006.

A.V.R.A. Records of California acquired rights to distribute their catalog in 2023. The self-titled album from 1980 was reissued in 2023, followed by a second digital release titled "Tango!" in April 2024. "Sound On Sound", released in June 2025, features the last of unissued studio recordings by the group. "Live In Vancouver 1981" followed in September 2025.

== Discography ==
Album and EP

- Blue (1979, EP), Quintessence
- Blue Northern (1981), Polydor
- Tango! (2024), A.V.R.A. Records
- Sound On Sound (2025), A.V.R.A. Records
- Live in Vancouver 1981 (2025), A.V.R.A. Records

Singles

- "Can't Make No Sense" / "Live...Dance" (1980), Polydor
- "Too Late To Turn Back" / "Half As Much" (1980), Polydor
- "Can't Stop" / "Be My Girl" (1981), Polydor
- "100%" / "Vagabond" (1981), Polydor
- "You're Not The Same Girl" / "You Got Me Where You Want Me" (1981), Polydor
