= Susan Cowsill =

American musician, singer and songwriter (born 1959)

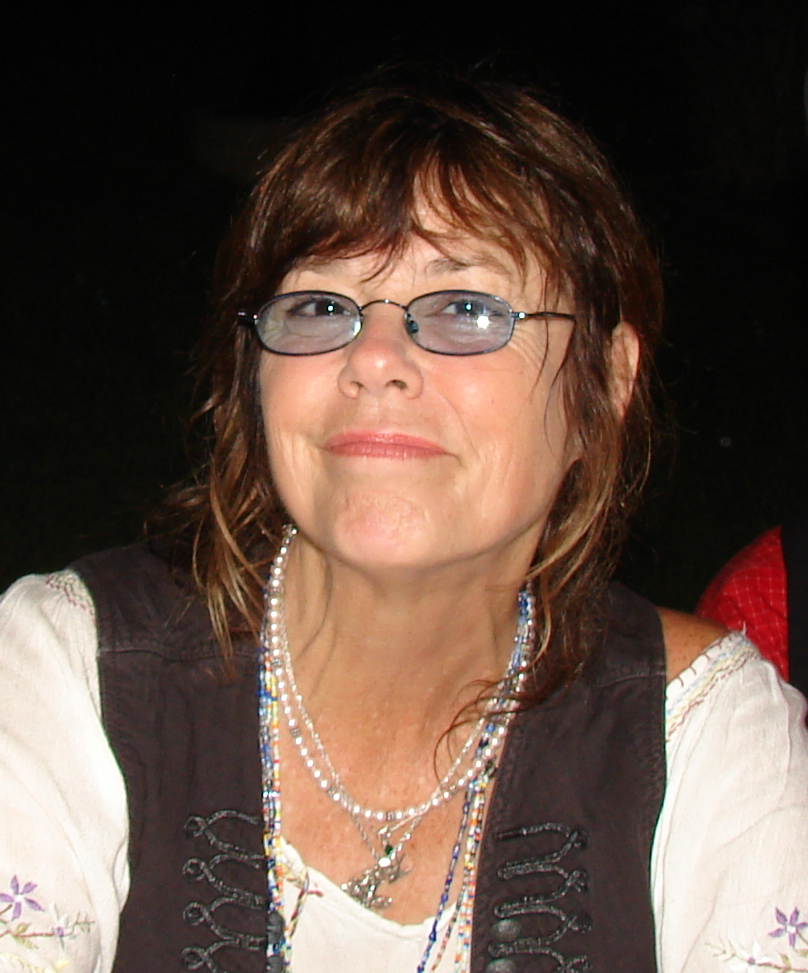
- Cowsill at Abbey Road on the River in 2019

Background information
- Born: Susan Claire Cowsill; May 20, 1959 (age 67); Canton, Ohio, U.S.
- Genres: Rock, pop, Americana
- Occupations: Singer, songwriter, backing vocalist
- Instruments: Vocals, tambourine, guitar
- Years active: 1967–present
- Labels: MGM, London, Warner Bros.
- Website: susancowsill.com

Susan Claire Cowsill (born May 20, 1959) is a musician, vocalist and songwriter. She rose to prominence as a member of the family band The Cowsills. After touring with Dwight Twilley for quite some time in the 1980s, she co-formed the band Continental Drifters. Since 1990, she has been with the Cowsills, along with brothers Bob and Paul.

== Early life ==
Susan Claire Cowsill was born in Canton, Ohio, to William "Bud" and Barbara Cowsill. She is the youngest child and only daughter of seven children (her brothers being Bill, Richard, Bob, Paul, Barry and John).

== The Cowsills ==
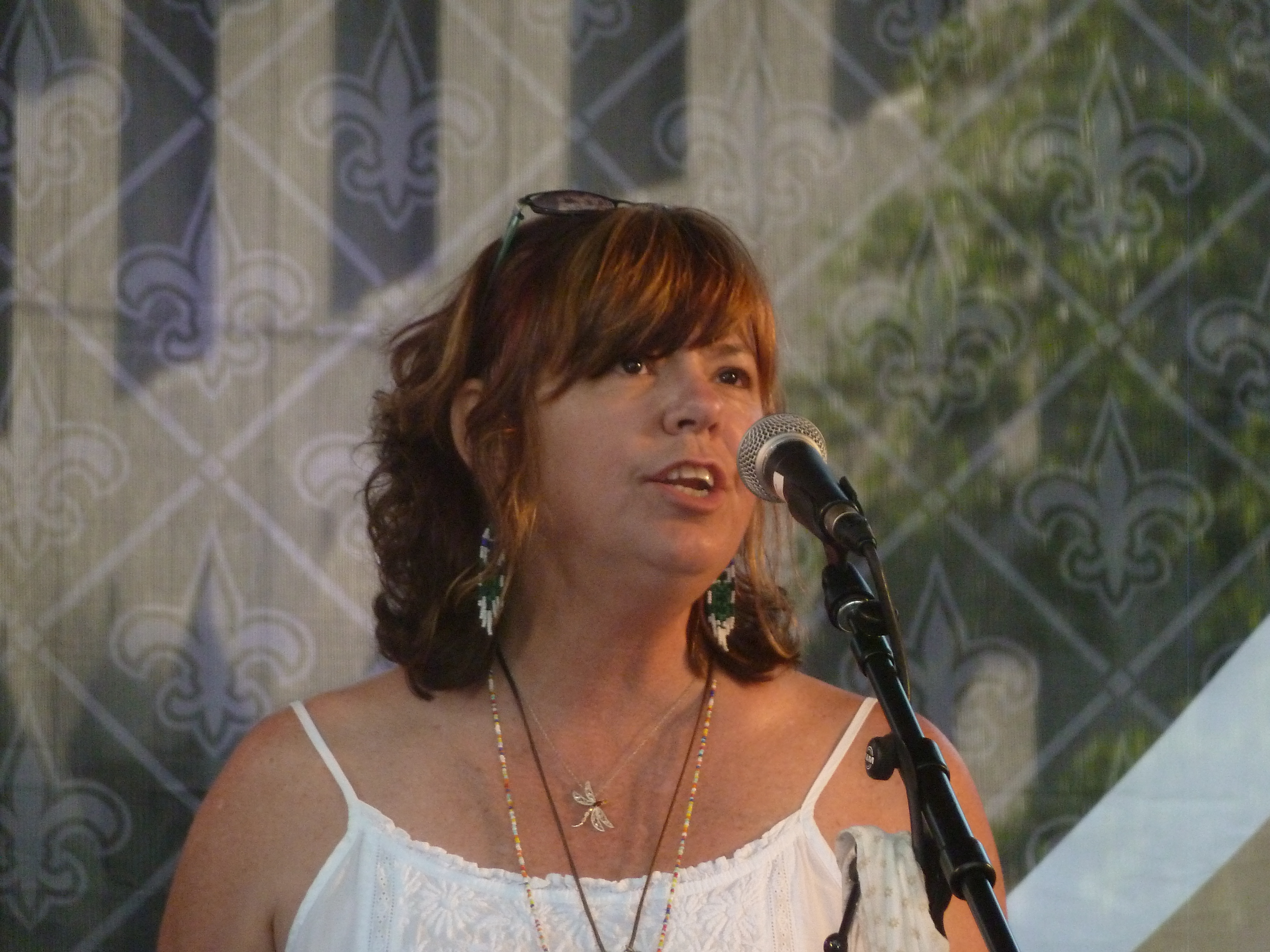
Cowsill performs in New Orleans, Louisiana, April 23, 2014.

Cowsill began her musical career with the Cowsills in 1967; she made her debut on We Can Fly, the Cowsills' second MGM Records album, released in early 1968. Her debut solo vocal was a song called "Ask the Children", featured in the Cowsills' third MGM album, Captain Sad And His Ship Of Fools. Her contribution to the Cowsills' backing vocals made her, upon her ninth birthday, the youngest person to be directly involved in a top ten hit record when "Indian Lake" made the Top 10 in the early summer of 1968.

In 1969, she contributed to the vocals in what would become the Cowsills' biggest hit, "Hair". She became known for her performance of the line "and spaghetti'd", which she sang with a squeakiness in her voice that she still uses when she performs the song live.

Cowsill was initially relegated to playing the tambourine, but by the time she left the group in 1971 (shortly after the release of their London Records album On My Side) she had learned to play other instruments; in an episode of the short-lived Barbara McNair Show she was seen playing bass guitar.

In 1978, she reunited with the Cowsills (without Bill and Barbara) to work on an album of new songs. The album, tentatively titled Cocaine Drain, was produced by Chuck Plotkin, but was not released until 2008. She again reunited with brothers Bob, Paul and John as the Cowsills in the 1990s, to work on another album of original songs. The album, Global, was released in 1998.

She and her brothers Bob and Paul appeared as the Cowsills as part of the 2016 Happy Together tour, playing 58 dates.

== Solo career ==
=== Music ===
Cowsill signed briefly with Warner Bros. Records in 1976, releasing two singles. The first single, released (apparently) in July 1976, was a cover of the Carole King/Gerry Goffin song "It Might As Well Rain Until September" (which was originally recorded by King herself in 1962.) The B-side was her version of Warren Zevon's "Mohammed's Radio". Zevon was little-known at the time, and his own recording came out at almost exactly the same time as Cowsill's. A second single was released in 1977, a cover of the 1971 Sixto Rodriguez song "I Think of You". Neither single made the charts.

Beginning in the early 1980s, she worked as a backing vocalist for varying artists including Dwight Twilley, the Smithereens, Carlene Carter, Mike Zito, and Hootie & the Blowfish. During this time her songwriting skills blossomed, and several of her songs have been covered by other artists.

By the early 1990s, she had developed an affinity for Americana-style music, which in 1991 led to her joining the Continental Drifters, further honing her songwriting talents. She occasionally appeared in a duo with bandmate Vicki Peterson (formerly of the Bangles), calling themselves the Psycho Sisters. (Peterson subsequently married Susan Cowsill's brother John Cowsill.) Cowsill permanently relocated to New Orleans, Louisiana by 1993.

In 2005, on the heels of a rare Christmas snowfall in New Orleans, Cowsill wrote and recorded Crescent City Sneaux, contrasting the peace of that snowfall with the disaster of Hurricane Katrina. The song has been described as an "anthem" for survivors of the hurricane.

She has also made guest appearances on others' albums including Hootie and the Blowfish's 2003 self-titled release, Paul Sanchez's 2008 album Exit to Mystery Street, Giant Sand's 1992 release Glum, and A Fragile Tomorrow's Beautiful Noise (2008), Tripping Over Nothing (2010), and Be Nice Be Careful (2013).

By 2005, Cowsill had released her first solo album, Just Believe It, on her own Blue Corn indie label.

The Susan Cowsill Band's "Covered In Vinyl" performances have featured classic rock albums played live in their entirety. Two album releases have been compiled from these shows: Live at Carrollton Station: Covered In Vinyl Series Vol. 1, released in 2007, and Vol. 2 in 2009. A portion of proceeds from CD sales have benefited New Orleans charities. Two digital albums from subsequent performances, CIV: Duets and CIV: Neil Diamond (recorded in 2010) were made available in 2012. The CIV band has included New Orleans guitar virtuoso Jimmy Robinson (Woodenhead, Twangorama), Pete Winkler (Motorway), Caleb Guillotte (Deadeye Dick), Derek Huston, Paul Sanchez, and many others.

Cowsill's second solo album, Lighthouse, was released in 2010 with support from the New Orleans musicians' organization Threadheads. It is a concept album in which she reflects on her losses, mainly through Hurricane Katrina and the deaths of brothers Barry and Bill. The album features harmonies from her surviving brothers (Bob, Paul and John) as well as appearances by Jackson Browne and Vicki Peterson, and was released May 18, 2010.

In 2012, Cowsill, Freedy Johnston, and Jon Dee Graham, working together as the Hobart Brothers and Lil' Sis Hobart, released a collaborative album entitled At Least We Have Each Other. In August 2014, after playing together for more than 20 years, Cowsill and Peterson released their first album as the Psycho Sisters, entitled Up on the Chair, Beatrice.

=== Television ===
Cowsill made numerous appearances with her family on many variety shows in the 1960s and early 1970s including a solo appearance on The Dean Martin Show. She and her band performed as themselves in the HBO drama Treme (2011, season 2, episode 8 titled "Can I Change My Mind"), set in post-Katrina New Orleans.

== Personal life ==
Cowsill's home and belongings (including a sizable amount of Cowsills memorabilia) were destroyed by Hurricane Katrina. Her brother Barry stayed behind and became one of the victims of the hurricane; his body was not found until shortly after Christmas 2005. The day before Barry's funeral, she learned her oldest brother Bill had succumbed to illness in Calgary. She paid tribute to Barry on her latest CD with her version of his song "River of Love". Despite her losses, she remains a New Orleans resident and still performs regularly with her band at Carrollton Station, and more recently at New Orleans live venue Chickie Wah Wah.

She married fellow band member and drummer Russ Broussard in July 2003. She has one daughter, Miranda Holsapple, from her marriage to musician Peter Holsapple. Her sister-in-law via her brother John is The Bangles guitarist Vicki Peterson.

== Discography ==
=== With Continental Drifters ===
==== Singles ====
- "The Mississippi" b/w "Johnny Oops" (1992)
- "Christopher Columbus Transcontinental Highway" b/w "Meet on the Ledge" (1997)

==== 10-inch ====
- Listen, Listen (2001)

==== LPs ====
- Continental Drifters (1994)
- Vermilion (1998)
- Better Day (2001)
- Nineteen Ninety-Three (2003)
