= John Cowsill =

American musician (born 1956)

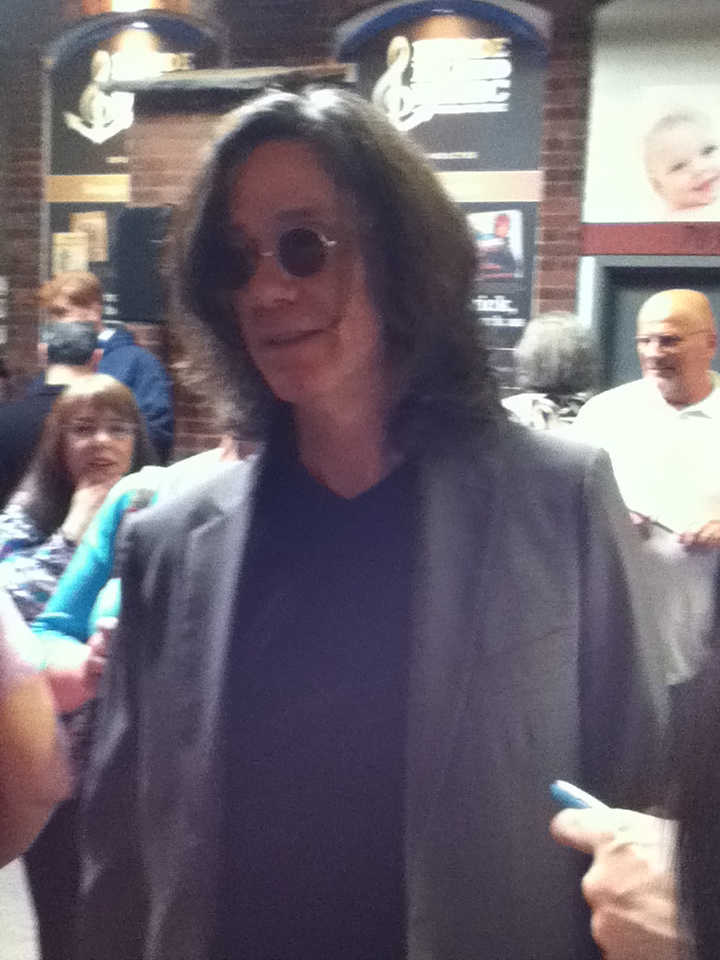
- Cowsill in 2013

Background information
- Born: John Patrick Cowsill; March 2, 1956 (age 70); Newport, Rhode Island, U.S.
- Occupations: Musician; songwriter; producer
- Instruments: Drums; vocals; keyboards
- Years active: 1965–present
- Formerly of: The Cowsills, the Beach Boys

John Patrick Cowsill (born March 2, 1956) is an American musician, best known for his work as a singer and drummer with his siblings' band the Cowsills. He has been a drummer and vocalist for the Beach Boys touring band, which featured original Beach Boys member Mike Love and long-time member Bruce Johnston. Cowsill has played keyboards for the Beach Boys touring band performing Al Jardine's and the late Carl Wilson's vocal parts. He has performed and recorded with Jan and Dean and is currently a guest lead singer for The Smithereens.

== Early life ==
John Patrick Cowsill was born in Newport, Rhode Island to William "Bud" and Barbara Cowsill. He is the second youngest of seven children (Bill, Richard, Bob, Paul, Barry, John, Susan).

== Career ==
=== The Cowsills ===
In the wake of Beatlemania, John and three of his brothers, Bill, Bob, and Barry, formed their own group solely based around the Liverpool band. Soon after, their mother Barbara and sister Susan joined. They signed with a record label in 1965 and after releasing a few non-commercially successful singles, were transferred to MGM Records in 1967. Their first single with MGM was "The Rain, the Park & Other Things".

John performed mainly backing vocals, although he sang lead on "Silver Threads and Golden Needles". From 1967 to 1969, the family group had more hit songs such as "Indian Lake", "We Can Fly", and "Hair". They split in 1972, although John re-appeared with the band for most of its reunion appearances. The Cowsills were the main inspiration for the sitcom The Partridge Family.

=== Tommy Tutone ===
In the early 1980s, Cowsill recorded with the one-hit wonder band Tommy Tutone, playing percussion and singing back-up vocals on the band's hit, "867-5309/Jenny," although he did not appear in the video.

=== The Beach Boys ===
Cowsill began playing with the Beach Boys touring band on keyboards in 2000. He moved to the drums in 2008. His solos for the concerts include "Wild Honey", "Sail On, Sailor", "Darlin'" and "California Dreamin'" on the 2022 tour. In 2011, Cowsill performed alongside the Beach Boys on their 50th Anniversary Reunion Tour. Cowsill appears on the band's subsequent studio album, That's Why God Made the Radio (2012). He also performed on Mike Love's solo albums Unleash the Love (2017) and Reason for the Season (2018).

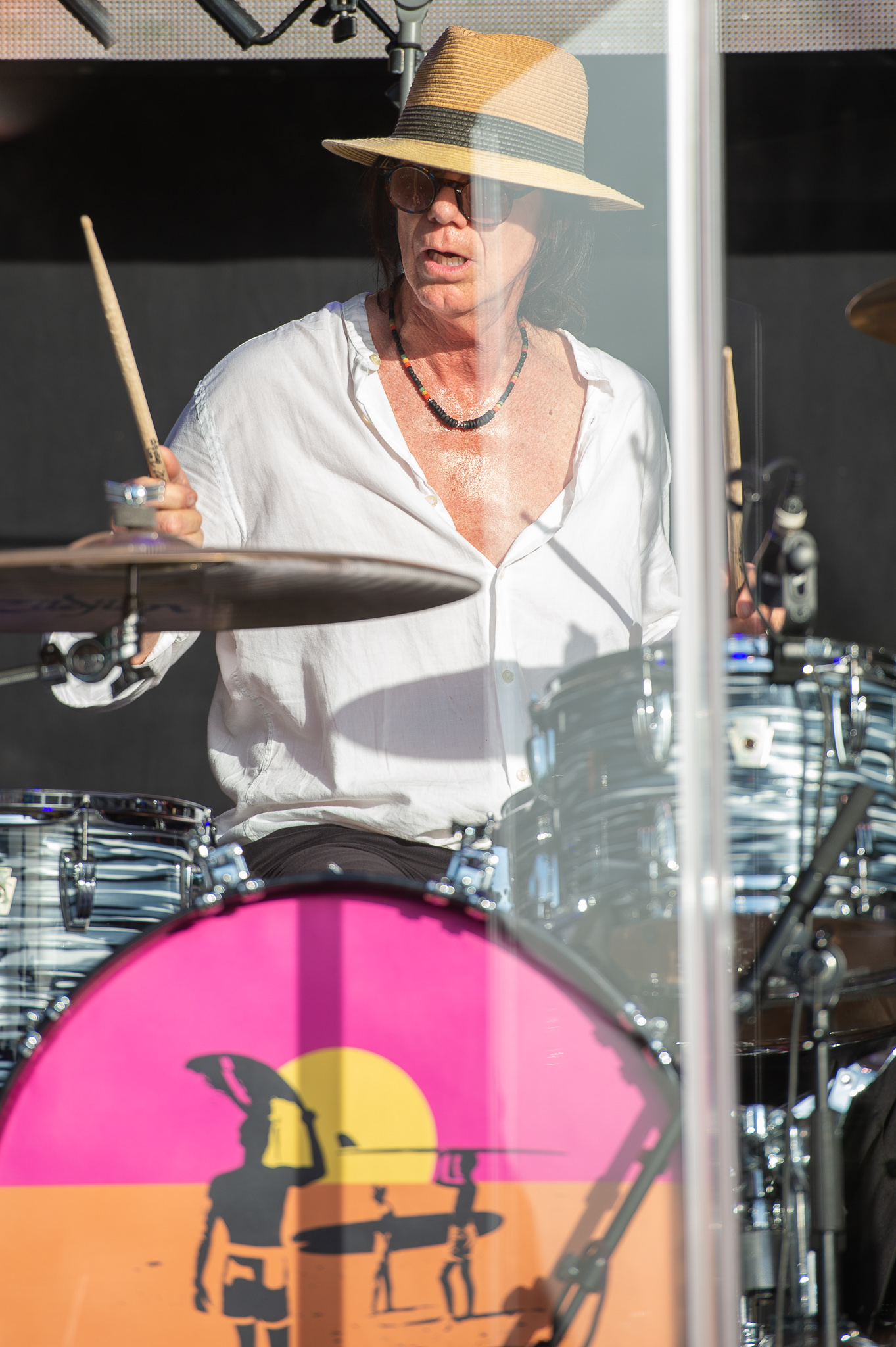
Cowsill performing with The Beach Boys in 2019.

Cowsill was let go from the Beach Boys touring crew in 2023. In a podcast recorded April 26, 2023, John said: "A guy, Scott Totten - who is the musical director of the Beach Boys, and I got let go four days ago. We didn't know why, but I think they .... they are definitely going in a different direction. I spoke to Mike and there is no ill will. I know that's hard to believe, but there is just none. It's just .... we're fine. Everybody's fine. It was just a little shock. It's a change. It was going to come anyway and that's just part of life. So, I'm available if anybody needs a really, really good singer and a drummer who may not be the best, but has the best time being one. So, I play really well.”

=== Other works ===
In 2017, Cowsill joined with Vicki Peterson and Bill Mumy as the band Action Skulls to release an album (also including posthumous contributions from the bassist Rick Rosas) entitled Angels Hear.

For a time, he was part of Dwight Twilley's band, as was his sister Susan Cowsill.

In 2025, John and his wife Vicki Peterson (founding member of The Bangles) released a collaborative debut Americana album consisting of songs written by John’s late brothers, Barry and Bill Cowsill titled, “Long After the Fire”.

== Personal life ==
In October 2003, he married Vicki Peterson of the Bangles.

== Discography ==
=== With Tommy Tutone ===
==== Studio albums ====
| Year | Album details | | |
|---|---|---|---|
| Year | Album details | 1981 | Tommy Tutone 2 |

==== Singles ====
| Year | Single | | |
|---|---|---|---|
| Year | Single | 1981 | "867-5309/Jenny" |

=== With the Beach Boys ===
==== Albums ====
- That's Why God Made the Radio (2012)

==== Singles ====
- That's Why God Made the Radio (2012)
- Isn't It Time (2012)

=== Mike Love ===
==== Albums ====
- Unleash the Love (2017)
- Reason for the Season (2018)
