= Rattled Roosters =

Canadian rockabilly band

- Origin: Vancouver, British Columbia, Canada
- Genres: Rockabilly, swing, pop, punk
- Years active: 1990–2001
- Label: Hootennany / popomatic
- Members: Rick Royale, Ed Maxwell, Crash Gordon, Joel D’arlen
- Website: www.RattledRoosters.com (defunct)

Rattled Roosters are a rockabilly band from Vancouver, Canada.

== History ==
The Rattled Roosters formed in 1990, with a line-up including "Rev. Rick" (Rick Royale), Crash Gordon, Tony Longlegs, and Lucky. They started busking on the streets of Vancouver, British Columbia, and spent the early nineties touring Canada and the West Coast. They gained notoriety for their wild live show, stylish attire and kick starting a scene in the Pacific North West that embraced a merging of rockabilly, swing music, pop, and punk.

In 1991, the Rattled Roosters were asked to host North West Rock an independent music video series guest hosted by some of the most influential local bands of the time including Mudhoney (Sub Pop), Hammerbox (C/Z Records), Tad (Sub Pop)and Grammy Award winning rapper Sir Mix A Lot (Nasty Mix / American Recordings) of "Baby Got Back" fame.

The Rattled Roosters first album Year of the Rooster was produced by Bill Cowsill lead singer of The Cowsills. Before moving from Vancouver the Rattled Roosters shared the stage with No Doubt, Royal Crown Revue, Goldfinger, Cherry Poppin' Daddies, Reverend Horton Heat, and Little Richard. The band was signed to BangOn/Cargo Records and re-released Year of the Rooster as well as the single "Marilyn" in 1993.

The band relocated from Vancouver to Los Angeles in 1996, where they released their second album, Young & Modern. The video for their song "Love is... a Holiday" was never aired as it was banned by MuchMusic for "glamorization of smoking and drinking".

The Rattled Roosters moved to Hollywood in the mid-nineties. Playing regularly at Johnny Depp's Viper Room, the band made National entertainment news when television tabloid host Jerry Springer sang with them on stage. That same year the Rattled Roosters were featured in W magazine in an editorial photo spread titled "Young Americans", shot by Mario Testino, featuring influential, young, California taste makers.

In 1999, a third album Retro-Spex (hootenanny/popomatic) was released combining tracks off the first recordings, new material and unreleased songs.

== Discography ==
=== Albums ===
| Year | Title | Label |
|---|---|---|
| 1999 | Retro-Spex | Hootenanny/Popomatic |
| 1996 | Year of the Rooster (re-release) | BangOn/Cargo Records |
| 1996 | American Rumble Volume 1 (Various Artists) | Skizmatic Records |
| 1996 | Young & Modern | BangOn/Cargo Records |
| 1991 | Next Heartbrake 1/4 Mile | Self-released |
| 1991 | Rocket ranch | |
| 1990 | Year of the Rooster | Self-released |
| 1989 | Get Wild! | Self-released |
| 1988 | Pretty Thing/Cut Across Shorty | Self-released |

=== Singles ===
| Year | Title | Label |
|---|---|---|
| 1995 | "Marilyn" | BangOn/Cargo Records |

== Members ==
- Rick Royale
- Ed Maxwell
- Crash Gordon
- Joel Sigerson
