= Continental Drifters =

American rock band

- From the left: Robert Mache, Russ Brousard, Mark Walton, Susan Cowsill - Top: Vicki Peterson, Peter Holsapple - Photo by Rick Olivier

Background information
- Origin: Los Angeles, California
- Genres: College rock, indie rock, power pop
- Years active: 1991–2003, 2009–present
- Labels: SOL; Black Dog; Blue Rose; Monkey Hill; Razor & Tie
- Spinoff of: The Cowsills; The dB's; The Dream Syndicate
- Members: Mark Walton; Peter Holsapple; Susan Cowsill; Vicki Peterson; Robert Maché; Russ Broussard
- Past members: Carlo Nuccio; Gary Eaton; Ray Ganucheau; Dan McGough
- Website: continentaldrifters.com

The Continental Drifters are an American rock band, formed in Los Angeles, California, in 1991 and dissolved in New Orleans, Louisiana, about a decade later, before reuniting in the years since. Though the lineup changed several times, at one point the band could be described as a college rock/indie-rock/power pop supergroup, including as it did Peter Holsapple of The dB's, Mark Walton of The Dream Syndicate, Bangle Vicki Peterson and Susan Cowsill of The Cowsills.

== History ==
The band was formed in Los Angeles in 1991, initially consisting of Carlo Nuccio (drums, vocals), Ray Ganucheau (guitars, banjo, vocals), Mark Walton (bass), Gary Eaton (guitars, vocals) and Danny McGough (keyboards). The group gigged regularly at Raji's in LA, and were often joined by Susan Cowsill and Vicki Peterson on backing vocals and guitars, and Peter Holsapple (keyboards, guitars), though these three players were not yet official members.

Holsapple was asked to join the band, but initially declined, offering instead to produce the group's debut album. The resulting disc was not released at the time; after it was completed, Holsapple, Cowsill and Peterson all joined the band officially, while McGough dropped out.

Led by New Orleans natives Nuccio and Ganucheau, most of the band moved to New Orleans over a span of several months during 1993/94. Eaton was the only member who didn't make the move, and who consequently left the band. However, shortly after the move Ganucheau dropped out, being replaced by Robert Maché. This line up (Nuccio/Walton/Cowsill/Peterson/Holsapple/Maché) recorded the band's first issued album, Continental Drifters, in 1994.

Nuccio left the band after the tour for the first album. He was replaced by Russ Broussard, and this line up issued two albums: Vermilion (1998) and Better Day (2001).

Cowsill and Broussard left the group in early 2002. The remaining players drafted drummer John Maloney and the returning Ganucheau to continue for several gigs.

In 2003, the band's unissued debut album was finally released, and a lineup of Eaton, Ganucheau, Nuccio, Holsapple, and Walton played a gig to celebrate.

On April 28, 2009, the group reunited for the fifth annual Threadhead Patry in New Orleans, and a show on May 1 at Carrollton Station, playing to a sold-out crowd.

In 2015, Omnivore Recordings issued a double album retrospective called Continental Drifters — Drifted: In The Beginning & Beyond which was focused on unreleased and live tracks from the band's long history. In September 2015, the band, including all members from both the Los Angeles era and the later New Orleans manifestations, came together for fundraising concerts in New Orleans and Los Angeles.

Founding member Carlo Nuccio died on August 24, 2022.

A book about the band and a tribute album We Are All Drifters: A Tribute to the Continental Drifters were released in September 2024 on the Cool Dog Sound label. The book was written by Sean Kelly, a musician, author, and frequent collaborator of the band. Kelly and Los Angeles-based musician David Jenkins co-produced the tribute album, which features contributions from Marshall Crenshaw, Kim Richey, Garrison Starr, George Porter, Jr., and Don Dixon, among others.

== Discography ==
Singles

- "The Mississippi" b/w "Johnny Oops" (7"/45rpm, 1992, SOL)
- "Christopher Columbus Transcontinental Highway" b/w "Meet On The Ledge" (7"/45rpm, 1997, Black Dog)

10"

- Listen, Listen (CDEP/10", 2001, Blue Rose)

LPs

- Continental Drifters (1994, Monkey Hill/2001, Razor & Tie)
- Vermilion (CD, 1998, Blue Rose/1999, Razor & Tie)
- Better Day (CD, 2001, Razor & Tie/Blue Rose)
- Nineteen Ninety-Three (CD, recorded 1993/released 2003, Blue Rose)

Compilations and appearances

- "When You Dance, I Can Really Love" (CD, 1995, This Note's for You, Too: A Tribute to Neil Young, Inbetweens)
- "I Can't Let Go" (CD, 1995, Sing Hollies in Reverse, Eggbert)
- Drifted: In The Beginning & Beyond (CD, released 2015, Omnivore Recordings)
- White Noise & Lightning: The Best of the Continental Drifters (CD, released 2024, Omnivore Recordings)
- We Are All Drifters: A Tribute to the Continental Drifters (CD, released 2024, Cool Dog Sound)

== Band members ==
- Mark Walton – Bass, Acoustic Guitar, Vocals
- Carlo Nuccio (died 2022) – Drums, Guitar, Vocals
- Gary Eaton – Guitar, Vocals
- Ray Ganucheau – Guitar, Banjo, Vocals
- Dan McGough – Organ, Piano
- Peter Holsapple – Guitar, Keyboards, Accordion, Mandolin, Vocals
- Susan Cowsill – Acoustic Guitar, Vocals
- Vicki Peterson – Guitars, Vocals
- Robert Maché – Guitars, Mandolin, Vocals
- Russ Broussard – Drums
