= Barry Cowsill =

American musician and member of the Cowsills (1954-2005)

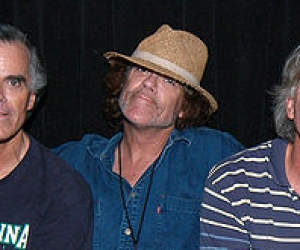

Background information
- Born: Barry Steven Cowsill; September 14, 1954; Newport, Rhode Island, U.S.
- Died: c. September 2, 2005 (aged 50) New Orleans, Louisiana, U.S.
- Occupations: Musician; songwriter; producer
- Years active: 1960–2005
- Formerly of: The Cowsills

Barry Steven Cowsill (September 14, 1954 – c. September 2, 2005) was an American musician, songwriter and producer. He was the bassist of the musical group The Cowsills, who had three top-10 singles in the late 1960s.

== Early life ==
Barry Steven Cowsill was born in Newport, Rhode Island to William "Bud" and Barbara Cowsill. He was the third youngest of seven children (Bill, Richard, Bob, Paul, Barry, John, Susan).

== Career ==
=== The Cowsills ===
As a young teenager, Barry started as the drummer (and later became known as the bass player) of the band, The Cowsills. Initially formed by his brothers Bill and Bob Cowsill, the trio played popular tunes at local clubs, church benefits and parties.

The band introduced their younger brother John on drums and switched Barry to bass. The quartet were signed by Mercury Records. In 1966, they released three singles: "Most of All", "Party Girl", and "What's It Gonna Be Like". The band was dropped by Mercury, but they were discovered by Artie Kornfeld and signed to MGM Records.

By the late 1960s, the band expanded to include his mother Barbara, older brother Paul, and younger sister Susan. The Cowsills went on to churn out a string of hits (including the #2's "The Rain the Park and Other Things" and "Hair") before officially disbanding by 1972.

On the 1970 Cowsills' biblical-themed studio album, II x II, Barry sang lead vocals on the opening track, originally written by Bill Cowsill. He also sang lead on his first song written, an acoustic composition titled "Don't Look Back", inspired by Crosby, Stills and Nash. On the track "The Prophecy Of Daniel And John The Divine", Barry is heard speaking and reciting a passage. The song's verses was inspired and taken from The Bible's Book of Revelation.

On the 1971 Cowsills' studio album, On My Side, Barry sang lead and composed two acoustic tracks "Dover Mine" and "Down On The Farm", and also had featured lead vocals on "Good Ole Rock & Roll Song".

In 2000, all members of the Cowsills participated in a reunion concert at The Taste of Rhode Island Festival, including Barry, Bill and Richard Cowsill, who previously were not involved in the 1998 Cowsill's album Global.

=== Bridey Murphy ===
In 1974, the band Bridey Murphy was formed with Waddy Wachtel, Bill, Barry and Paul Cowsill and (briefly) Lindsey Buckingham. They released one single in 1974 "The Time Has Come" backed with "Be Your Mother's Son" on Capitol.

=== Solo ===
Throughout his life, he continued to play music and participated in various post-heyday incarnations of the Cowsills. He idolised Mick Jagger and Keith Richards of the British band The Rolling Stones, and took on personas.

In 1980, Cowsill released a limited edition cassette tape of demos titled A Portrait of Barry Cowsill. The recording session at Kingsound Studio, featured session musicians Dennis Brown (on electric guitar) and George Green (on drums). Barry played bass, acoustic guitar, and piano.

In 1998, he released his first solo album, As Is. This was followed by his second solo album, U.S. 1, which was released posthumously in 2009.

In 2010, Susan Cowsill did a rendition of Barry's song "River of Love" with other members of the Cowsills, featuring on her Lighthouse solo studio album.

== Personal life ==
In 1987, Barry Cowsill married Deborah Scott with whom he had two children, Kiera and Collin. Cowsill and his wife were divorced in 2003. Cowsill had another older daughter Carrie, born out of wedlock in 1977.

== Life and health ==
After the Cowsills broke up, Cowsill moved frequently and worked various jobs including construction and waiting tables. For a time, Cowsill owned a bar in Austin which he admitted he lost because he "drank it dry. I was drinking my face off in those days."

In 2002, he relocated to his hometown of Newport, Rhode Island. In 2005, Cowsill relocated again to New Orleans. Shortly before his death, he had made plans to enter a Los Angeles rehab facility to seek help for his alcoholism. His flight to Los Angeles had been scheduled for August 28, but those plans were stymied when Hurricane Katrina caused the closing of Louis Armstrong International Airport and subsequently hit the city on August 29.

== Disappearance and death ==
On August 29, 2005, Hurricane Katrina hit the city of New Orleans. Cowsill, who chose not to evacuate, weathered the storm in an abandoned warehouse. Cowsill survived the storm but was in need of help. He called his sister Susan from a pay phone (Susan also lived in New Orleans with her family but chose to evacuate) and left four voice mail messages saying he was surrounded by looters and people shooting. Susan Cowsill did not receive the messages until September 2. Cowsill was never heard from again. After an extensive search, Cowsill's body was found under a wharf on the Mississippi River on December 28, 2005. His body was subsequently identified by comparison to dental records. Cowsill's death was attributed to drowning as a result of the flooding following Hurricane Katrina.

The Cowsill family held two memorials for Barry in Newport and New Orleans. Family members learned of his brother Bill's death (February 18, 2006) while holding a memorial service the next day, in Newport, Rhode Island, for Barry (his body had not been found and identified until January 2006). Barry's ashes were spread by a Copper Beech tree on the lawn of Halidon Hall, Newport.

== Discography ==
=== Solo ===
- Portrait of Barry Cowsill (1980)
- As Is (Lüd Von Records, 1998)
- U.S. 1 (2009)

=== The Cowsills ===
- The Cowsills (MGM, 1967)
- We Can Fly (MGM, 1968)
- Captain Sad and His Ship of Fools (MGM, 1968)
- "Hair" / "What is Happy" (MGM, 1969)
- The Cowsills in Concert (MGM, 1969)
- II x II (MGM, 1970)
- On My Side (London Records, 1971)
- "Covered Wagon" / "Blue Road" (London Records, 1972)

=== Compilation ===
- The Cowsills Plus The Lincoln Park Zoo (Mercury Wing, 1968)

=== Bridey Murphy ===
- "The Time Has Come" / "Be Your Mother's Son" (Capitol, 1974)

== See also ==
- List of people who disappeared mysteriously: post-1970
