= The Co-Dependents =

Canadian alt-country/roots band

The Co-Dependents were a Canadian alt-country and roots band, based in Calgary, Alberta, that existed between 1998 and 2004.

== History ==
The group was formed in Calgary, Alberta by Billy Cowsill on guitar and lead vocals, Tim Leacock on bass, Steve Pineo on guitar and vocals, and Ross Watson on drums. In the 1980s, Cowsill had taught Leacock to play bass. The initial group, commencing in 1998, was Cowsill and Leacock, performing at local venues. Leacock, Pineo and Watson had all had been members of The Burners, whose cassette release, Low Tech/High Torque, Cowsill had produced in 1988. Cowsill had returned to Calgary from Vancouver, following the breakup of The Blue Shadows in 1996, initially for the purpose of overcoming addiction challenges, rather than to continue in music.

The band was notable for having three strong singer-songwriters as members. The band was initially viewed by its members as an occasional and weekend band, due to the fact that Cowsill had enrolled at Mount Royal College as a full-time student in psychology. The band became quite popular in Calgary and in parts of western Canada and the United States, playing a mix of country, bluegrass, blues, rock and rockabilly music. The band obtained a regular weekend engagement at The Mecca Café in Calgary and, in June 2001, recorded their performances over three nights. These were released by Calgary independent music label Indelible Music, owned by music promoter and manager Neil MacGonigill, as Live Recording Event (2001) and Live At The Mecca Café, Volume 2 (2005). Live Recording Event was regarded, as of 2004, as one of the most successful Alberta roots recordings in memory. The recordings were produced by Nashville producer Miles Wilkinson, who had previously worked with Anne Murray, Brian Ahern and The Band, using Wilkinson's mobile recording studio. The recording was financed by Calgary developer Abe Epp.

Cowsill's health declined as of the early 2000s, as he was suffering from emphysema, Cushing syndrome and osteoporosis. Despite Cowsill's serious health challenges, the Co-Dependents continued to perform until late 2004, as Cowsill's health permitted. The band's later performances, without Cowsill, were as the Joe Defendants. The surviving band members performed at Cowsill's Calgary memorial, following Cowsill's death in 2006.

== Discography ==
- 2005 Live At The Mecca Café, Volume 2 (Recorded 2001) Indelible
- 2001 Live Recording Event Indelible
