= Neil MacGonigill =

Canadian music promoter, manager and record label owner (1948–2025)

Neil MacGonigill (May 15, 1948 – October 31, 2025) was a Canadian music promoter, manager and record label owner.

== Biography ==
Neil MacGonigill was born in the farming community of Bowden, Alberta, on May 15, 1948. His career in music commenced in Calgary in the 1970s, when he was involved in sales and distribution for various record labels.

MacGonigill's first management engagement was as the manager of Alberta-based performer Diamond Joe White. Around 1980, he became the manager of Ian Tyson. He became the road manager for K.d. lang in the mid 1980s and also at this time discovered Jann Arden, becoming her manager and executive producer of a number of her records. MacGonigill worked with Arden from 1985–1998, following which their association ended and the two became estranged.

In 1996, MacGonigill was the executive producer of Ian Tyson's All The Good 'uns, released on Vanguard Records and which achieved gold record status in Canada. Other artists whose careers have been guided by MacGonigill include Gaye Delorme and Billy Cowsill.

In 2000, MacGonigill founded the independent label Indelible Music, through which he released, between 2000 and 2007, a number of albums by Calgary-based artists, including The Co-Dependents and Billy Cowsill. In later years, he primarily focused on artist management and development, such as singer-songwriters Joe Nolan and Sykamore.

MacGonigill died on October 31, 2025, at the age of 77.
