= The Northwest Company =

Canadian garage rock band

Background information
- Origin: Haney, British Columbia, Canada
- Genres: Garage rock; protopunk; hard rock
- Years active: 1966-1973
- Labels: Grenadier, Apex, London, Coast, Stamp
- Past members: Rick McCartey; Ray O'Toole; Vidor Skofteby; Gowan Jurgensen; Jerry Ringrose; Richard Stepp; Zak August; Leslie Law

The Northwest Company was a Canadian garage rock band from Haney, British Columbia who were active from the mid-1960s through the early 1970s. Though they never became a national success, they were among the most popular in British Columbia throughout existence. The Northwest company is known for a hard-driving sound heard in such songs such as "Hard to Cry," and has been featured in various compilations such as the History of Vancouver Rock and Roll series.

== History ==
Originally known as the Bad Boys, the band formed in Haney, British Columbia, a suburb of Vancouver, now known as Maple Ridge. Their original lineup consisted of Rick McCartey (lead vocals), Ray O'Toole (lead guitar and vocals), Vidor Skofteby (rhythm guitar), Gowan Jurgensen (bass), and Jerry Ringrose (drums). In the early years, the band wore matching suits and their stage antics included synchronized dance steps, and sometimes the group's large-framed and muscular lead singer Rick McCartey would hoist their diminutive lead guitarist Ray O'Toole onto his shoulders in the middle of a song. The band's became known for a loud and raucous sound, featuring highly overdriven guitars and power chords.

Dale Clark, sometimes referred to as "Pale Dale," became the group's manager, and he arranged for the band to record on Grenedier Records. In July 1967, the band laid down five tracks at Vancouver's Telesound Studios, including "Eight Hour Day" and "Get Away from It All" (both O'Toole/Jurgensen compositions) and Vidor Skofteby's hard-driving "Hard to Cry," which the band had already recorded a previous demo version of. "Hard to Cry Cry" b/w "Get Away from it All" was chosen to be the band's first single and received a modest degree of airplay in the Vancouver area. Shortly after the release of the single, drummer Jerry Ringrose departed and was replaced by Richard Stepp, who had previously played in Vancouver group the Questions. At this time the signed with another label, Apex records. There, they released "Time for Everyone" b/w "She's a Woman" followed by "Can You Remember" b/w "The Sunday Dog." The band signed with London Records in early 1968, who would release "Eight Hour Day" as the band's next single. Eventually, singer McCarty left the band, from which point on the various members of the group would swap vocals.

In 1971, the band signed with North Vancouver's Coast Records and would release two singles that year which were both recorded at the studio built for the soundtrack to the movie, McCabe & Mrs. Miller and distributed by Canada's affiliate of London Records. One of the releases was the Small Faces and Humble Pie-influenced "Rock 'N' Roll Lover Man." In 1971, Ray O' Toole left the band to be replaced by Leslie Law on rhythm guitar, but O' Toole would later return to the lineup, which in 1973 would consist of himself, Jorgenson, Law, and Stepp. The band signed with Stamp Records in 1973. They released the single, "The Bandit", b/w "There Ain't Nothing Wrong With Rock And Roll," which became a minor hit in Canada. Still, the band's success remained primarily regional. In late 1973, after the release of their sixth single, the Northwest Company broke up.

Ray O'Toole would go on to become a member of popular country rock band, Blue Northern. In 1983, "Rock 'N' Roll Lover Man" was included on the History of Vancouver Rock and Roll, Volume 3 compilation issued by the Vancouver Record Collectors' Association. Three tracks from the July 1967 session appeared on History of Vancouver Rock and Roll, Volume 4.

== Membership ==
- Rick McCartey (lead vocals)
- Ray O'Toole (lead guitar and vocals)
- Vidor Skofteby (rhythm guitar)
- Gowan Jurgensen (bass)
- Jerry Ringrose (drums)
- Richard Stepp (drums)
- Zak August (guitar)
- Leslie Law (rhythm guitar)

== Discography ==
- "Hard to Cry Cry" b/w "Get Away from it All" (Grenedier, 1967)
- "Time for Everyone" b/w "She's a Woman" (Apex, 1967)
- "Can You Remember" b/w "The Sunday Dog" (Apex, 1967)
- "The End is Autumn" b/w "Eight Hour Day" (London, 1968)
- "Rock 'N' Roll Lover Man" b/w "Let it All" (Coast, 1971)
- "The Bandit" b/w "There Ain't Nothing Wrong with Rock and Roll" (Stamp, 1973)
