= Zen (Dutch band) =

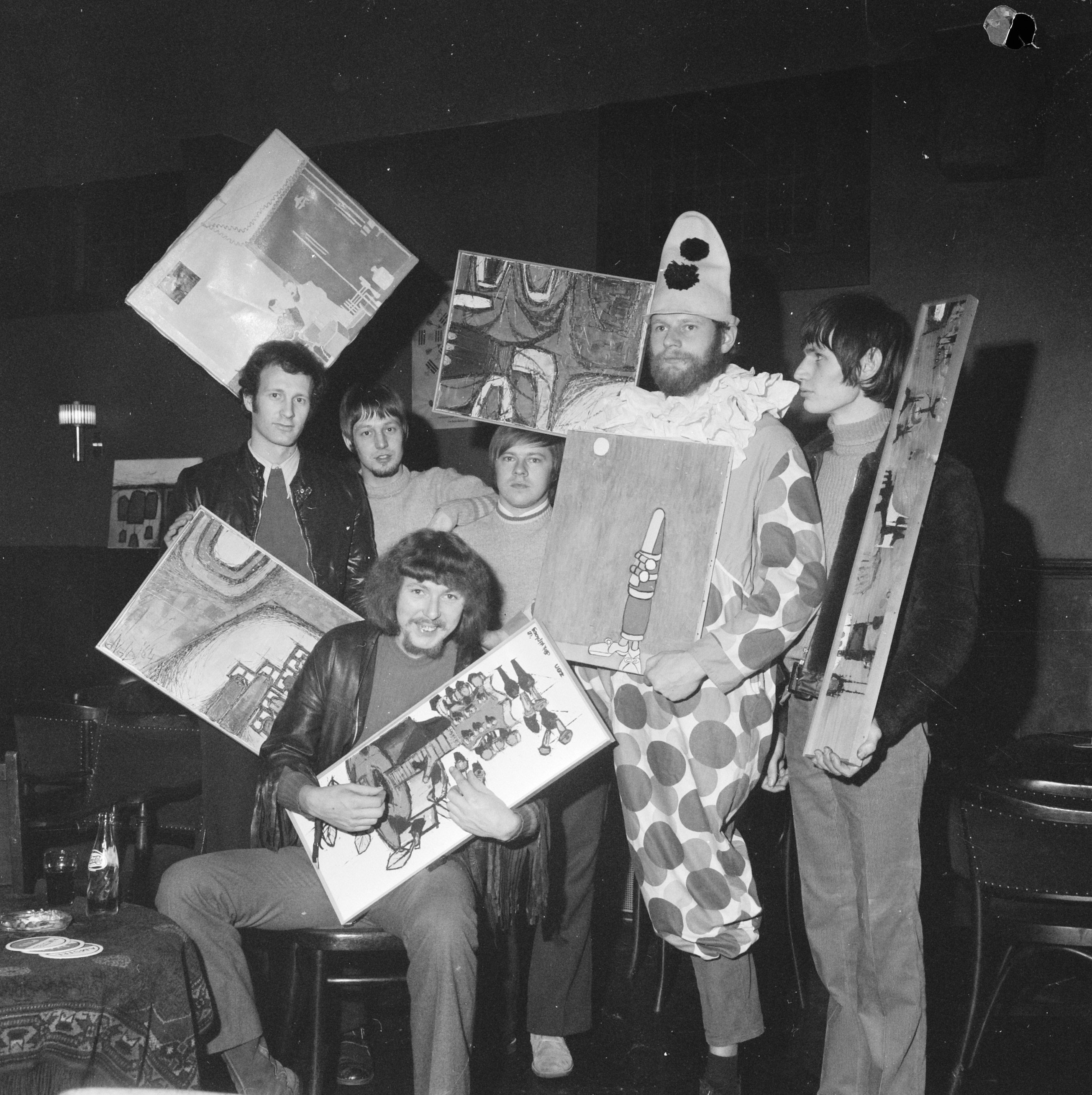
- Zen (1969)

Background information
- Origin: Netherlands
- Years active: 1965–1977
- Past members: Siegfried de Jong; Dirk van der Ploeg; Cees Visser; Valentijn Geverts; Bart Bos; Duco de Rijk; John Brands; Wim Taarling; Harry Rijnbergen; Bennie Groen; Dave Vreeland; Ruud Klokgieter; Ed Postema; Johan van der Meer; Floris van Manen; Peter Huijing; Tony Souren; Dick Hendriks; Peter Swinkels; Alex de Laar; Ar Jelier; Frank Tijdink; Dirk Tolsma; Cor Kerker

Zen was a Dutch rock band, founded by Siegfried 'Siebe' de Jong (vocals and saxophone) and Dirk van der Ploeg (guitar and vocals) in 1965. Van der Ploeg was the songwriter for the band, but the band underwent numerous changes in its line-up in its existence. The hippie-oriented one hit wonder band hit the top spot on the Dutch Top 40 singles chart in January 1969, with their version of the theme song from the musical Hair.

== Career ==
The band was formed in 1965 in Amsterdam by Siegfried 'Siebe' de Jong, Dirk van der Ploeg. Other members of the band were Cees Visser (vocals, guitar) Valentijn Geverts (drums) en Bart Bos (bass). The early singles released by the band were "You Better Start Running Away From Me" in 1967 and "Don't Try Reincarnation" in 1968, but neither of the songs achieved much success. The first change in line-up occurred after the second single release, and Duco de Rijk, John Brands and Wim Taarling joined the band while Visser and Geverts left.

In 1968, the band released a cover of "Hair", which reached No. 1 on the Dutch charts in January 1967. An album titled Hair was also released.

Their only other single to enter the Dutch Top 40 was "Get Me Down", it peaked at No. 26 in 1969. Another change in line-up took place with Harry Rijnbergen and Bennie Groen replacing Brands, De Rijk and Taaling. However, the band then broke up in 1970 with some pursuing solo careers.

In 1972, Siebe de Jong reformed the band with new band members: Dave Vreeland (vocals, sax, organ, piano), Ruud Klokgieter (vocals, guitar), Ed Postema (bass, guitar), Johan van der Meer (vocals, bas) and Floris van Manen (drums). In 1973 Peter Huijing replaced Ed Postema. They released an album Zen Again in 1973. The band did not achieve further success and after further line-up changes, the band was dissolved in 1977. In the 1980s the first incarnation of the band played some reunion concerts.

== Discography ==
=== Albums ===
- Hair (1969)
- Zen Again (1973)

=== Singles ===
- "You Better Start Running Away From Me" (1967)
- "Don't Try Reincarnation" (1968)
- "Hair" (1968) (No. 1 NL)
- "Get Me Down" (1969) (No. 26 NL)
