= Vermilion (Continental Drifters album) =

Studio album by Continental Drifters
- Released: 1998, Germany; 1999, United States
- Studio: Dockside
- Genre: Roots rock
- Labels: Blue Rose; Razor & Tie
- Producer: Continental Drifters

Continental Drifters chronology
Continental Drifters (1994)	Vermilion (1998)	Better Day (2001)

Vermilion is an album by the American band the Continental Drifters, released in 1999. It was first released in Germany, in 1998.

== Production ==
The drummer Russ Broussard played on the album, replacing Carlo Nuccio. Produced by the band, Vermilion was recorded over 17 days in Maurice, Louisiana, at Dockside Studio.

== Critical reception ==
Professional ratings
Review scores
Source	Rating
AllMusic	4/5 stars
Robert Christgau	A−
Lincoln Journal Star	5/5 stars
Orange County Register	A
The Republican	4/5 stars

Robert Christgau thought that "the lyrics resolve on home truisms, earned and learned but predictable nonetheless, just like the alt-pop songforms and country-rock groove," and singled out Susan Cowsill for praise. Trouser Press called the album "mature, artistic and affecting," writing that "the eight-minute 'Daddy Just Wants It to Rain' is a monumental and powerful piece of family autobiography." No Depression considered it "graceful, poetic, intimate and deliciously harmonized, but still plenty rock-minded."

CMJ New Music Report wrote that "touching country-gospel harmonies dominate this album, which taps deep into the soul of American roots music." Sound & Vision opined that "guitarist Robert Mache is the unsung hero of the lot, putting a personal spin on the Neil Young/Robbie Robertson tradition of thrill-ride soloing." The Chicago Tribune declared that the album "vibrates with life, serving up roots rock in all its flavors: tough, tender, twangy, toe-tapping but with more urgency than the genre frequently exhibits (and without the complacency)."

AllMusic called the sound "downright messy at times, with acoustic and electric guitars splayed out around indistinct bass and clattering drums and the occasional mandolin and rubboard."

== Track listing ==
No.	Title	Length
1.	"The Rain Song"
2.	"Drifters"
3.	"Way of the World"
4.	"Don't Do What I Did"
5.	"Spring Day in Ohio"
6.	"Watermark"
7.	"I Want to Learn to Waltz with You"
8.	"Meet Me in the Middle"
9.	"Heart, Home"
10.	"Darlin Darlin"
11.	"Christopher Columbus Transcontinental Highway"
12.	"Who We Are, Where We Live"
13.	"Daddy Just Wants It to Rain"
14.	"Anything"

== Personnel ==
- Russ Broussard – drums
- Susan Cowsill – vocals, guitar
- Peter Holsapple – vocals, guitar
- Robert Mache – guitar
- Vicki Peterson – vocals, guitar
- Mark Walton – bass
