= The Cowsills =

American vocal group

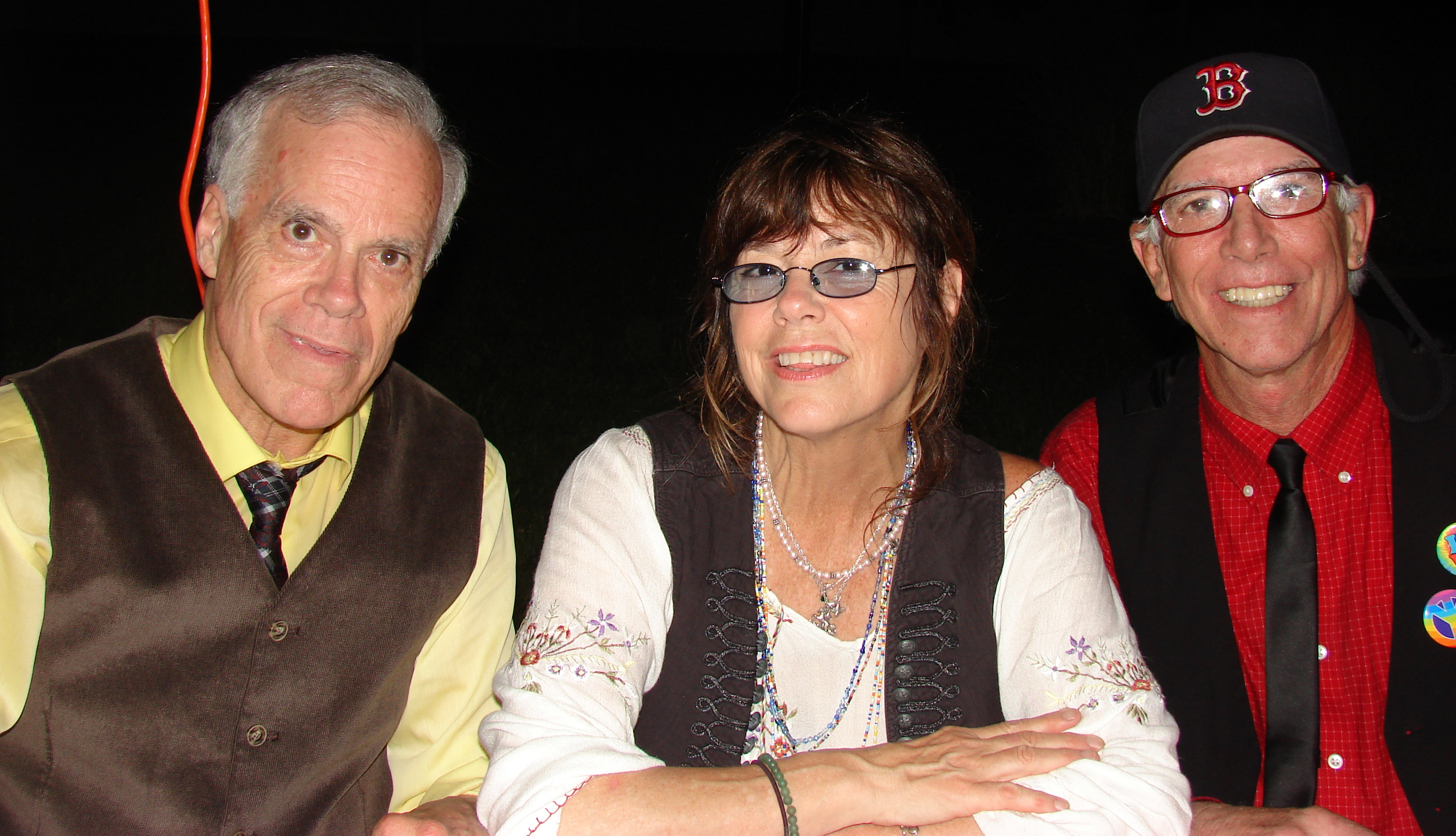
- The Cowsills at Abbey Road on the River in 2019; left to right: Bob, Susan, and Paul

Background information
- Origin: Newport, Rhode Island, U.S.
- Genres: Sunshine pop; pop rock; psychedelic pop
- Years active: 1965–1972, 1978–1980, 1989–present
- Labels: MGM, Polydor, Joda
- Members: Bob Cowsill; Susan Cowsill; Paul Cowsill
- Past members: John Cowsill; Bill Cowsill; Barry Cowsill; Barbara Cowsill; Richard Cowsill
- Website: cowsill.com

The Cowsills are an American singing group from Newport, Rhode Island, six siblings noted for performing professionally and singing harmonies at an early age, later with their mother.

The band was formed in early 1965 by brothers Bill, Bob, and Barry Cowsill; their brother John joined shortly thereafter. Originally Bill and Bob played guitar and Barry played the drums. When John learned to play drums and joined the band, Barry began playing bass. After their initial success, the brothers were joined by their siblings Susan and Paul along with their mother, Barbara. A seventh sibling, Bob's fraternal twin brother Richard, was never part of the band during its heyday, although he occasionally appeared with them in later years.

The band's road manager for most of their career was Richard "Biggie" Korn. When the group expanded to its full family membership by 1967, the six siblings ranged in age from 8 to 19. Joined by their mother, Barbara Cowsill (née Russell), the group inspired the 1970s television show The Partridge Family.

== Origins and early successes ==
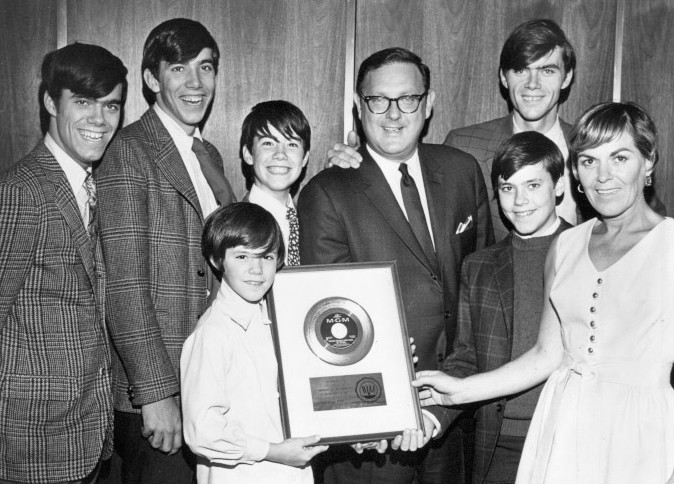
The group receives their gold record for "The Rain, the Park and Other Things" from MGM Records President Mort Nasatir, 1967. Front L-R: Susan, Barry and Barbara. Back L-R: Bob, Paul, John, Mort Nasatir and Bill

The Cowsills' musical interest started while their father, William "Bud" Cowsill, was stationed in Canton, Ohio, in the late 1950s, as a US Navy recruiter. Bill and Bob taught themselves how to play the guitar. As the boys' musical and vocal abilities developed they began performing at church school dances in Stark County, Ohio. These, and other performances, led to the boys' first television appearance on the Gene Carroll Show on WEWS in Cleveland.

After Bud retired from the Navy, he and his wife managed their children's career until 1967.

In late 1965, the Cowsills were hired as a regular act on Bannisters Wharf in Newport. The group performed many of the popular songs of the day including the music of the Beatles. A handful of singles were released on JODA Records, a label owned by Danny Sims and Johnny Nash (of "I Can See Clearly Now" fame), and Philips Records in 1965 and 1966, to only modest success. After Leonard Stogel took over management of the band, they were signed to MGM Records in 1967. Barbara, who would become known to their fans affectionately as "Mini-Mom" due to her diminutive stature, joined the group just in time to record the band's first album, including the hit single "The Rain, the Park & Other Things" with Bill on lead vocals. It sold over one million copies and was awarded a gold record. With the success of "The Rain ...", the band quickly became a popular act in the U.S., and achieved significant airplay in Britain and other parts of Europe. "The Rain, The Park and Other Things" reached No. 2 on the Billboard Hot 100.

Bob Cowsill is quoted as follows on the band's early days:

Although Bill and I performed at a very young age, and Bill, I, Barry and John did a lot of frat parties at Brown University and clubs in Newport ... the most memorable performance of what I would view as the precursor of what The Cowsills would be was at Kings Park in Newport (right at the foot of Halidon Hall) at some carnival. The family angle just evolved ... first Bill and me, then Bill me and Barry, then Bill, me, Barry and John, then Bill, me, Barry, John and Mom, then Bill, me, Barry, John, Mom and Paul, then later, me, Paul, John, Barry, Mom and Susan, then back to Bill, me, Barry and John (very briefly in the end) and then to me, Paul, John and Susan. Our first real break came when we were playing the MK Hotel in Newport (in the basement there) and a guy from the "Today Show" saw us and asked if we wanted to be on the "Today" show. We weren't famous or anything but we were young and we were related and we were quite good. So we went on "The Today Show" (I doubt a tape exists of that but if it did it would be priceless to see) and someone from Mercury Records saw us, which ultimately led to our signing with that label and putting out "Most Of All" (a great "school's out" song that should have been our first hit in my opinion), which led to Artie Kornfeld and Steve Duboff. Mercury dropped us, but Artie and Steve had written "The Rain, The Park and Other Things" and we went in and recorded that song at A&R studios in New York and took the whole package to MGM, who decided wouldn't it just be terrific if their mother performed with them and, voila, the rest, as they say, is history.

The Cowsills released five albums in all for MGM records between 1967 and 1970. Following the success of "Rain" and their eponymous album, the title track from their second album, "We Can Fly", peaked at No. 21 in the spring of 1968; by that time Susan was added to the group. Later that same year they scored another Top 10 hit with the song "Indian Lake", produced by Wes Farrell, which reached No.10 on the US charts. "Captain Sad and his Ship of Fools", the album it appeared on, was produced by Bill and Bob and had added Paul to the group.

In September 1968, after the group's summer tour, the family relocated to Santa Monica, California. Shortly after arriving, they received a copy of the "Hair" Broadway cast album in the mail from the famed writer-producer-actor Carl Reiner, who was putting together a special for television called "Wonderful World of Pizzazz". The special was to be a celebration of the hippie fashion and music of that time. Reiner wanted the group to appear on the show performing "Hair", the title track from the current hit musical, and indicated that their performance would also have a satirical edge thanks to the juxtaposition of the squeaky-clean family group performing a song about long-haired hippies. At that time, the group had not heard of the musical and considered the request from Reiner as more of an assignment.

Following rehearsals at their home, and demo sessions at SIR Studios on Santa Monica Boulevard, The Cowsills' version of "Hair" was recorded over two days in early October 1968 at TTG Studios in Hollywood, where the TV company producing the special were regular clients. A key attraction of TTG was its custom-built 16-track recorder, the only such machine available in Los Angeles at the time, which attracted leading rock acts like Jimi Hendrix and Frank Zappa. Working with house engineer Angel Balestier, the track was arranged and produced by Bob and Bill, who made sure that each member of the group got to contribute an individual vocal part to the recording, both in lead and background vocals, ensuring that each of the group's members would feature on screen when they performed it for the TV special.

Interviewed in 2018, Bob Cowsill recalled the intensive recording process, which was complicated by the fact that the group had not been in a recording studio for several months. The basic rhythm track was laid down first by Bill, Bob, John and Barry, but John (who was only 12 at the time) had difficulty mastering the time changes in the song, especially during the bridge ("Oh say can you see") section, and it reportedly required over 100 takes to achieve a satisfactory version. The group then proceeded to record the elaborate backing and lead vocal tracks, which were intricately arranged and engineered. The backing vocals were all double-tracked, and Balestier added additional "sparkle" to each vocal pass by sending the signal from the vocal microphone first through a Leslie speaker, then to the TTG echo chamber. The clean vocal signal, the "Leslie-ed" vocal signal and the Leslie-plus-echo signal were then all separately fed back to the console and mixed onto one track of the master. Each section of backing vocal was then double-tracked onto a second track, using the same setup of Leslie and echo, creating a very dense and lush sound. Another notable feature of the arrangement was dictated by the purpose of the recording - the network was concerned that some lyrics in the song might be problematic for viewers in the more socially conservative areas of the United States, so the group omitted the original final verse (which mentions God, Jesus and the Bible) and replaced it with a repeat of the first verse.

Balestier mixed the mono track for the group to use during the filming of the special at the end of the final day of recording, but MGM records had no interest in releasing the song at that time. Bill had an acetate of the song cut at DCT Recorders which ended up being played for a DJ at WLS (AM) in Chicago where it generated significant attention. The TV special was taped on January 5, 1969, in San Francisco. As the air date of March 18 approached, MGM changed their minds and released the single. The band had a No.2 US hit and million seller with this version of the title song from the musical Hair. A stereo mix of this elaborate studio version of "Hair" subsequently became the opening track for "The Cowsills in Concert" album, which was released in May 1969. The remainder of "The Cowsills in Concert" (which ended up being the band's best selling album) was in fact actually recorded live.

From 1968 through 1972, the band played an average of 200 performance dates per year. They had their own comic book published by Harvey Comics in 1968.

== Breakup and reunions ==
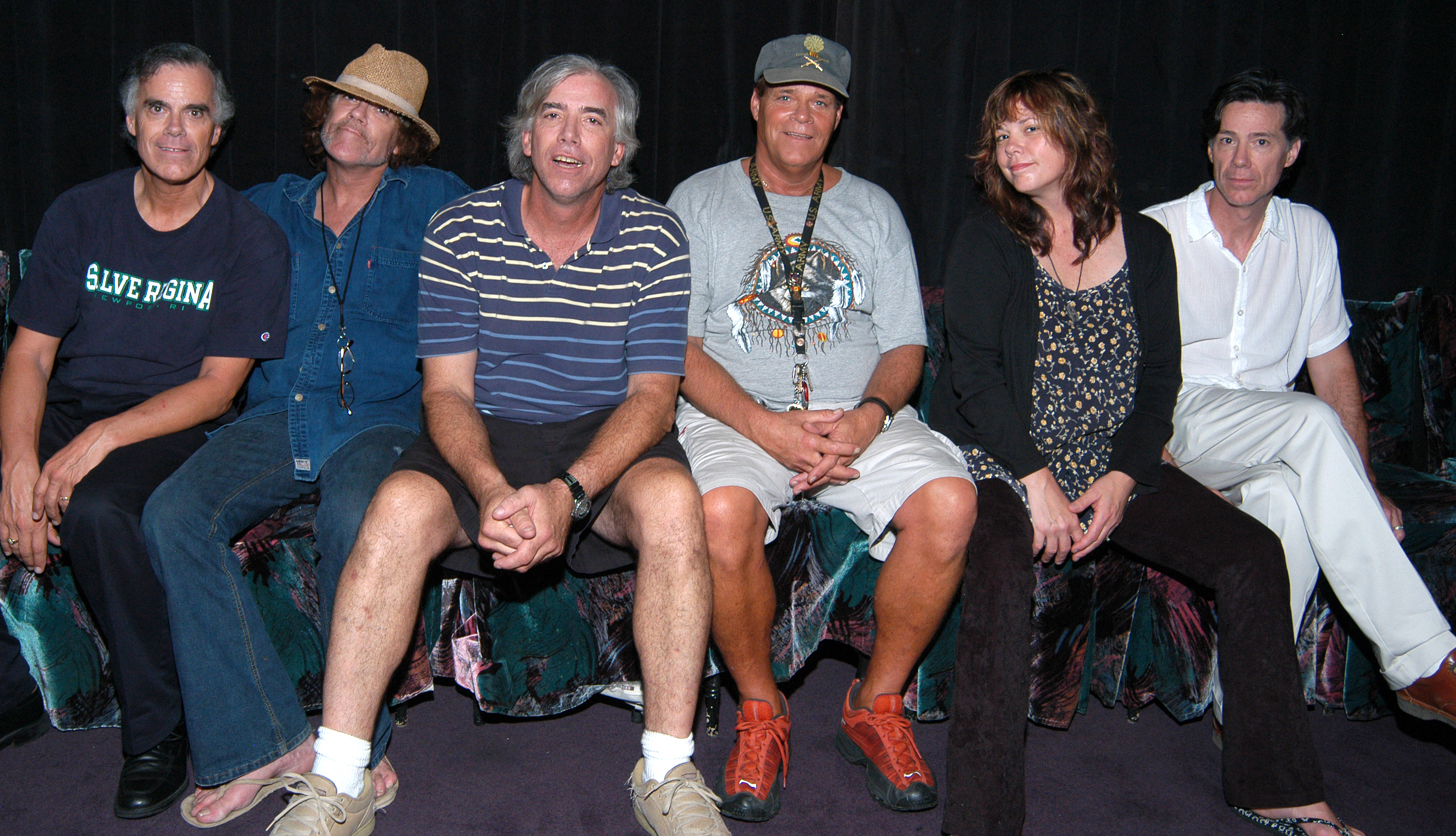
The Cowsills from their Billy Cowsill Benefit Concert in 2004. Left to right: Bob, Barry, Paul, Richard, Susan and John.

According to the documentary, Family Band: The Cowsills Story, Bill was fired by his father during the group's tenure at the Flamingo Las Vegas in February 1970 after they had an argument over Bill's association with Waddy Wachtel (whom Bud did not approve of) which ended with a physical confrontation, with Bud being arrested for assault. The band continued without Bill, and Bob took over as the leader. The album II x II was released just a few weeks after's Bill's departure. Musically, it heavily featured Bill since he'd been present for the recording sessions, but aside from a couple of songwriting credits, his name does not appear on the album. The title track was written solely by Bill, but it was credited to his pseudonym, David W. Ray. II x II spawned three singles, two of which were minor hits, but the album as a whole failed to get into the Billboard 200.

The group parted ways with MGM in 1970, and On My Side, their next release (and their first without Bill), was released on London Records in February 1971. This album did get into the Billboard 200, but just barely: it peaked at No. 200. Bill came back later in 1971, and the band subsequently released two non-album singles, neither of which were hits.

In 1971, the non-musical Cowsill, Richard received an Undesirable Discharge from the Army for drug use and other misconduct. He struggled with addiction and other issues for many years, and was arrested several times.

By 1972, Barbara, Paul and Susan had left the group. A lucrative deal for some casino appearances was abruptly canceled after the group refused to perform their hits. Shortly afterward, The Cowsills stopped playing together as a band altogether. The individual members went on to various career attempts in and out of the music industry, but they did appear at Madison Jr. High School in Tampa, Florida as "The Cowsills" for one performance during the mid-1970s. Some produced albums and performed from time to time, albeit not as The Cowsills, during the remainder of the 1970s. One project in particular was a band called Bridey Murphy, which was formed in the mid-'70s and featured Paul, Bill, Barry, and Waddy Wachtel, and performed to varying degrees of success.

In 1978 several of the Cowsills—including Paul, John, Barry, Bob and Susan—recorded an album called Cocaine Drain with producer Chuck Plotkin. In October 1978, they played a show at Blackie's Bar in Los Angeles which was favorably reviewed by Billboard in the weekly "Talent in Action" column. The 37-minute show opened with "a sultry rocker" titled "Cocaine Drain." The band had reportedly signed with Columbia Records and "were setting the stage for a nearly completed album." In March 2008 a version of the album was finally released, remastered from an acetate under Bob Cowsill's direction. Several other previously unreleased tracks were included on the 2008 release.

The central four members of the group created the power pop tune "Is It Any Wonder?" in 1993, which was released in the critically praised multi-artist collection Yellow Pills, Vol. 1: The Best of American Pop.

In the years following the group's split, Susan continued her musical career as a member of The Continental Drifters, along with both her first husband Peter Holsapple and her second husband, Russ Broussard. She was a member of Dwight Twilley's band in the mid-1980s, and currently leads her own band, the Susan Cowsill Band. Her first solo album, Just Believe it, was released in late 2005 by Blue Corn Music. In 2011 she was featured in an episode of the HBO series, Tremé.

John Cowsill has also continued his performing career. From December 2000 until 2023, John was a regular member of The Beach Boys’ touring band, playing keyboards (until 2007) and drums (after 2007). He also contributed to the harmony stack, as well as occasionally singing lead on songs like “Wild Honey” and "Help Me, Rhonda". John was also part of the backing band for The Beach Boys’ 50th Anniversary Reunion tour during 2012 and performed on the reunion album recorded in 2011 and 2012. In earlier years, he performed with artists such as Jan & Dean and Dwight Twilley.

Bill Cowsill moved to Canada in the 1970s and did well in that country as a solo artist, and as a member of Vancouver, British Columbia's Blue Northern, before forming The Blue Shadows, who recorded two albums for Sony Canada.

After working as a sound engineer for Helen Reddy, Paul Cowsill left music for a career in the construction industry. He worked as a landscaper on several movies and television shows including the Twilight series and Grimm.

In October 1989 Bob, Paul, John and Susan again regrouped as The Cowsills playing club dates in Los Angeles and appeared in concert for the syndicated radio show, The Lost 45s with Barry Scott on July 1, 1990. The original plan was to simply hit the "oldies circuit", but after some deliberation, they decided to showcase new material written by Bob and his wife, Mary Jo. This incarnation of the band started playing small clubs and showcases in the Los Angeles area and eventually spread out to similar venues across the country and into Canada. Their performances generated positive reviews from critics and fans alike, including a very well received performance on The Late Show Starring Joan Rivers.

The success of this reunion led The Cowsills back into the recording studio, which resulted in the album Global in 1998. This has also led to several reunions over the years in various forms, ranging from a few concerts to special feature performances at major events. Most notable of these events were "A Taste of Rhode Island in 2000", which featured all seven surviving Cowsills, and "A Family Thing 2", which was a benefit concert in 2004 for Bill's medical and financial difficulties at the time. This concert took place at the El Rey Theatre in Los Angeles and included an appearance by Shirley Jones, who introduced the band. It was the first time they had ever met. As the mother on the TV show inspired by the Cowsills, Shirley made a point of calling them "the real thing". Though she did not sing with them that night, immediately after her announcement the Cowsills played "I Really Want to Know You"; it is the one song recorded by both The Cowsills and The Partridge Family. During this period, Barry also released a solo CD, As Is.

In October 2004 Bob, Paul, Barry, Susan and Richard reunited to sing the national anthem at Fenway Park before Game 3 of the 2004 American League Championship Series between the Boston Red Sox and New York Yankees. This performance and rehearsals for it can be seen in the 2011 documentary, Family Band: The Cowsills Story.

Susan's first solo release, Just Believe It, was released in 2004 in Europe and 2005 in the United States. Susan Cowsill continues to play live in New Orleans with her husband Russ Broussard and their band, playing "Covered In Vinyl" performances that have featured classic rock albums played live in their entirety. Some of these performances have been recorded at New Orleans venues like Carrollton Station and Chickie Wah Wah.

Susan Cowsill's second solo album, Lighthouse was released in 2010 with support from the New Orleans musicians' organization Threadheads. It is a concept album in which she reflects on her losses, mainly through Hurricane Katrina and the deaths of brothers Barry and Bill. The album features harmonies from her surviving brothers (Bob, Paul and John) as well as appearances by Jackson Browne and Vicki Peterson, and was released on May 18, 2010.

The Cowsills were inducted into the Rhode Island Music Hall of Fame on April 28, 2013.

The Cowsills released Rhythm of the World, their first studio album of new material since 1998, on September 30, 2022.

As of 2024, the group consisting of Bob, Paul and Susan, and occasionally John, still perform and since 2015 have appeared on the annual "Happy Together" package tour with the Turtles and several other 1960s era bands.

== Members ==
Current members

- Bob Cowsill – vocals, guitar, keyboards (1965–1972; one-off performance in the mid-1970s; 1978, 1989, 1993, 1998, 2000, 2004, 2010, 2015?–present)
- Susan Cowsill – vocals, guitars, percussion, bass (1967?–1972?, 1978, 1989, 1998, 2000, 2004, 2010, 2015?–present)
- Paul Cowsill – vocals, percussion, keyboards (1967?–1972?, 1978, 1989, 1998, 2000, 2004, 2010, 2015?–present)

Former members

- Bill Cowsill – vocals, guitar (1965–1970, 1972?; one-off performance in the mid-1970s; 1993, 1998, 2000; died 2006)
- Barry Cowsill – vocals, bass, drums (1965–1972; one-off performance in the mid-1970s; 1978, 1993, 1998, 2000, 2004; died 2005)
- John Cowsill – vocals, drums (1965?–1972; one-off performance in the mid-1970s; 1978, 1989, 1993, 1998, 2000, 2010; occasional guest, 2015?–present)
- Barbara Cowsill – vocals (1967?–1972?; died 1985)
- Richard Cowsill – vocals (various reunion lineups, including: 2000, 2004; died 2014)

== Discography ==
=== Albums ===
Year	Album	Label	US Chart
1967	The Cowsills; CD/Cassette release 1994 by Razor & Tie 82037 with two bonus tracks: "The Impossible Years" / "Love American Style"; CD release 2009 by Now Sounds/Cherry Red Records CRNOW13 with eight bonus tracks	MGM E/SE-4498	31
1968	The Cowsills Plus the Lincoln Park Zoo; 8 tracks by the Cowsills recorded 1966–1967 plus two tracks by The Lincoln Park Zoo	Mercury/Wing SRW-16354	
1968	We Can Fly; CD release 2005 by Collectors' Choice CCM-612-2	MGM E/SE-4534	89
1968	Captain Sad and His Ship of Fools; CD release 2009 by Now Sounds/Cherry Red Records CRNOW7 with five bonus tracks	MGM E/SE-4554	105
1968	The Best of the Cowsills; CD release 1988 by PolyGram 344-2 with two bonus tracks: "Meet Me at the Wishing Well" / "Hair"; CD/Cassette re-released 1994 by Rebound 204-2 with different cover artwork; but the same two bonus tracks	MGM E/SE-4597	127
1968	The Cowsills; Italy release compilation	MGM SMGL-50008	
1969	The Cowsills in Concert; CD/Cassette release 1994 by Razor & Tie 82038 with four bonus tracks: (The "Milk" EP); "The Milk Song" / "All My Days" / "Nothing to Do" / "The Fun Song"	MGM SE-4619	16
1970	II x II	MGM SE-4639	
1971	On My Side; CD release 2010 by Now Sounds/Cherry Red Records CRNOW23 with three bonus tracks	London PS-587	200
1971	All-Time Hits	MGM GAS-103	
1989	The Rain, The Park & Other Things; 5 songs from first album, 3 songs from "We Can Fly" album	PolyGram 839 144-4	
1998	Global; Recorded circa 1993	Robin 81564	
2001	20th Century Masters - The Millennium Collection: The Best Of the Cowsills	Universal/Polygram 549947	
2006	Painting the Day: The Angelic Psychedelia of the Cowsills	EL/Cherry Red ACMEM69	
2008	Cocaine Drain; Recorded circa 1978	Robin 97974	
2022	Rhythm of the World	Omnivore Recordings	

=== Extended plays ===
Year	EP	Label	USA Chart
1969	The Cowsills Collectors Record: Presented by American Dairy Association; 4 Tracks: "The Milk Song" / "All My Days" / "Nothing To Do" / "The Fun Song"	MGM PEP-1	

=== Singles ===
Year	Single (A-side, B-side) Both sides from same album except where indicated	Label	US	AUS	NZ	CAN	Source Album
1965	"All I Really Want to Be Is Me" b/w "And the Next Day Too"	JoDa 103					Non-album Single
1966	"Most of All" b/w "Siamese Cat"	Philips 40382	118			81	The Cowsills Plus the Lincoln Park Zoo
1966	"Party Girl" b/w "What's It Gonna Be Like"	Philips 40406					The Cowsills Plus the Lincoln Park Zoo
1967	"A Most Peculiar Man" b/w "Could It Be, Let Me Know"	Philips 40437					The Cowsills Plus the Lincoln Park Zoo
1967	"The Rain, the Park & Other Things" b/w "River Blue"	MGM 13810	2	4	2	1	The Cowsills
1968	"We Can Fly" b/w "A Time for Remembrance"	MGM 13886	21	42		4	We Can Fly
1968	"In Need of a Friend" b/w "Mister Flynn"	MGM 13909	54			45	We Can Fly
1968	"Indian Lake" b/w "Newspaper Blanket"	MGM 13944	10	3	1	3	Captain Sad and His Ship of Fools
1968	"Poor Baby" b/w "Meet Me at the Wishing Well" (from Captain Sad and His Ship Of Fools)	MGM 13981	44	47		22	The Best of the Cowsills
1968	"The Path of Love" b/w "Captain Sad and His Ship of Fools"	MGM 14003	132	71			Captain Sad and His Ship of Fools
1968	"The Impossible Years" b/w "The Candy Kid" (from All-Time Hits)	MGM 14011	118	89			Make the Music Flow
1969	"Hair" b/w "What Is Happy?" (from We Can Fly)	MGM 14026	2	1	1	1	The Cowsills in Concert
1969	"The Prophecy of Daniel and John the Divine" b/w "Gotta Get Away from It All" (from We Can Fly)	MGM 14063	75	82		37	II X II
1969	"Silver Threads and Golden Needles" b/w "Love American Style" (from All-Time Hits)	MGM 14084	74	36		37	II X II
1970	"II x II" b/w "Start to Love"	MGM 14106					II X II
1971	"On My Side" b/w "There Is a Child"	London 149	108				On My Side
1971	"You (in My Mind)" b/w "Crystal Claps"	London 153					Non-album Singles
1972	"Covered Wagon" b/w "Blue Road"	London 170					Non-album Singles
1993	"Christmastime (Song for Marissa)" / "Some Good Years"	Rockville 6139-7					Global

== Television appearances ==
The Cowsills made many television appearances throughout the late 1960s and into the early 1970s. Their appearances included:

- The Ed Sullivan Show (twice, see below)
- The Tonight Show Starring Johnny Carson (twice)
- American Bandstand
- The Mike Douglas Show
- The Barbara McNair Show
- Playboy After Dark
- Kraft Music Hall
- Music Scene
- The Johnny Cash Show
- Wonderful World of Pizzazz

The Cowsills made their first appearance on The Ed Sullivan Show on October 29, 1967. Although contracted for ten appearances, their second and final appearance was on December 24, 1967, after Bud confronted the Sullivan production team over a technical glitch during the performance.

Game show appearances included The Generation Gap with Barbara and Bob, and To Tell the Truth in which the panel had to identify the real Barbara Cowsill, which was No. 2; she received two votes while one of the two "imposters" also received two votes. During game play, the siblings stood behind the three contestants.

They starred in their own television special, called A Family Thing, in November 1968 on NBC, which guest-starred Buddy Ebsen. By 1969 Screen Gems approached the family to portray themselves in their own TV sitcom, but when they were told that their mother was to be replaced by actress Shirley Jones the deal fell through. Screen Gems later hired Jones' stepson David Cassidy to join the TV show The Partridge Family, and to have a four-year run on ABC Television.

The Cowsills were also known as spokespeople for the American Dairy Association, appearing in advertisements promoting milk. They performed the theme for the David Niven film The Impossible Years (1968), and also sang the theme for Love American Style during the first season (1969).

On August 10, 2010, the documentary film, Family Band: The Cowsills Story debuted at the Rhode Island International Film Festival. On March 6, 2013, the film made its network television debut on Showtime. The film, directed by Louise Palanker and co-directed / edited by Bill Filipiak, tells the behind the scenes story of the family, their rise to fame and subsequent fall due to their father's controlling and abusive nature. The film features interviews with Tommy James, Shirley Jones, and radio personality Cousin Brucie.

In 2019, Bob, Paul, and Susan Cowsill were interviewed by journalist Rod Labbe for RetroFan magazine, in which they discussed their careers and lives together and apart.
