= Bill Cowsill =

American singer (1948–2006)

Billy Cowsill
- Born: William Joseph Cowsill Jr. January 9, 1948; Middletown, Rhode Island, U.S.
- Died: February 18, 2006 (aged 58) Calgary, Alberta, Canada
- Genres: Pop, alt-country
- Occupations: Musician, singer-songwriter, record producer
- Instruments: Guitar, vocals
- Years active: 1964–2006
- Labels: MGM, Polydor, Columbia Records, Indelible Music
- Formerly of: The Cowsills; Bryan Fustukian Band; Blue Northern; Billy Mitchell's Trainwreck; The Blue Shadows; The Co-Dependents

William Joseph Cowsill Jr. (January 9, 1948 – February 18, 2006) was an American singer, musician, songwriter, and record producer. He was the lead singer and guitarist of The Cowsills, who had three top-10 singles in the late 1960s. From the mid-1970s until his death, he was a successful alt-country artist and producer in Canada.

== Early life, The Cowsills, 1964–1969 ==
Bill Cowsill was born in Middletown, Rhode Island, the eldest child of the seven Cowsill children—six boys and one girl—and was named after his father, William Joseph "Bud" Cowsill (1925–1992). At a young age, Bill began singing with his younger brother Bob (born August 26, 1949), playing guitars provided for them by their father, who at the time was serving in the U.S. Navy. The brothers had originally wanted to form a rock band. In 1965, at their father's insistence, Bill and Bob formed The Cowsills with their brothers Barry on bass and John on drums. After his retirement from the navy, their father became their full-time manager. He was physically and emotionally abusive towards his family, in both his spousal and parental roles; this abuse continued during his role as the group's manager.

The Cowsills started playing around Newport and, in 1965, recorded their first single, "All I Really Wanna Be is Me," on the independent label JoDa Records, which was founded by Johnny Nash. Cowsill recalled that Nash wanted the band to be a "white rhythm and blues band" and sent them home with Jimmy Reed albums, which is how Cowsill learned to play harmonica. Although the single failed to chart, an appearance on the NBC Today Show to promote it was seen by Shelby Singleton, who offered them a contract with Mercury Records. In 1966, they released three more singles: "Most of All", "Party Girl", and "What's It Gonna Be Like". These songs failed to spark interest. The band was dropped by Mercury, but they were discovered by Artie Kornfeld and signed to MGM Records. Kornfeld persuaded the children's mother, Barbara, to contribute backing vocals behind Bill's lead on "The Rain, The Park & Other Things", a song written by Steve Duboff and Artie Kornfeld and released in 1967, as a single and on their debut album, The Cowsills. At this point, the brothers' younger sister Susan and brother Paul joined the band. Richard wanted to join the group; Bud would not allow it.

"The Rain, The Park & Other Things" sold over a million copies and reached number 2 on the Billboard Hot 100. Bill and Bob co-produced their second album, We Can Fly, which was released in December 1967. It spawned a second Top 40 hit with the title track. "We Can Fly" was written by Bob Cowsill, Bill Cowsill, Steve Duboff, and Artie Kornfeld, and would be successfully recorded by several acts, notably Al Hirt and Lawrence Welk. Bill produced the band's third album, Captain Sad And His Ship Of Fools, which was released in September 1968. From this album, "Indian Lake" became another Top 10 hit, but Cowsill felt that it was an inferior song, and he fired the producer, Wes Farrell. Farrell said he doubted that Cowsill could do better. When Carl Reiner asked the Cowsills to perform a musical skit on his 1969 TV special, which involved modeling wigs from Japan, Cowsill produced a version of the title track from the rock musical Hair. It peaked at No. 2 and sold 2.5 million copies.

The Cowsills were noted for their ability to sing multiple-part harmonies with remarkable accuracy and were one of the most popular musical acts in America. This led to Columbia Pictures division Screen Gems considering a sitcom based on their story and starring most of the members of the band; the deal was abandoned when the producers of the show wanted to replace Barbara in the cast. The show would later become The Partridge Family, with David Cassidy playing the lead singer and with his step-mother Shirley Jones as the mother in the show.

It was commonly thought that Cowsill's involvement with the family band came to an abrupt end in 1969 when Bud caught him smoking marijuana. In fact, Cowsill's dismissal occurred after he and his father got into a drunken brawl in the lounge of the Flamingo Hotel in Las Vegas, when Bud insulted Bill's friends, particularly guitarist Waddy Wachtel. Police had to be called to break up the fight; Bill was dismissed, or quit, the next day. According to Bob Cowsill, Bill's dismissal was the beginning of the end of the Cowsills as a group, because no other sibling could assume his leadership role. After the band's break-up in 1972, it was discovered that most of their wealth had been lost through Bud Cowsill's financial mismanagement.

== Tulsa, Nervous Breakthrough, Cowsills Reunion, 1970-1975 ==
Cowsill had no qualms about leaving the family band, later saying that he "hated" the life and the lack of musical control. From Las Vegas, he (and Wachtel) went directly to Tulsa, Oklahoma, where he began playing in bars, "for ten bucks a night and all the whiskey you could drink." He was able to sit in with Harry Nilsson, J.J. Cale and Carl Wilson, co-founder of The Beach Boys. This led to Bill being considered as the replacement for Brian Wilson in The Beach Boys' live performances. Instead, Cowsill stayed in Tulsa and, in late 1970, released his solo album, Nervous Breakthrough.

There is a persistent myth, sometimes encouraged by Cowsill that, at this time, Cowsill bought a bar in Austin, Texas and "drank it dry". In fact, Cowsill was one of several people who pitched in to purchase the old railway bar, McNeil Depot, in 1978, and then sold it to its current owner a few months later.

Cowsill had married Karen Locke in 1968; their son Travis was born in Tulsa in 1971. At this point, Cowsill reunited with The Cowsills and wrote and produced two singles, "You (In My Mind)" and "Crystal Claps", two of six singles that the group released that year. By 1972, The Cowsills had dissolved. Bill and Karen moved to Los Angeles, where Bill spent a few years playing and producing. In 1974, he joined Wachtel and his brothers Paul and Barry and they formed a group called Bridey Murphy. They released one single which Wachtel had co-written, "The Time Has Come", but nothing more came of it. By 1975, Cowsill's drug abuse problems were well entrenched. He was newly divorced and estranged from his family. He decided to move to Canada, choosing Yellowknife, Northwest Territories as his destination.

== Yellowknife, Edmonton, Bryan Fustukian Band, 1975–1977 ==
Cowsill played in the bars and hotels of Yellowknife for a short time; the city has just 20,000 people and a limited number of entertainment venues. He moved south to Edmonton, which is the capital of Alberta and a much larger and more cosmopolitan city. He began meeting other musicians and joined up with a group of them to form The Hair Trigger Cowboys. The band's drummer, Bruce Larochelle, would recall, "His body language reminded me of that of an outlaw or a gunfighter, roaming from town to town, always looking over his shoulder. But he [was] just a kid though, just a kid. He was also pretty road-hardened, at the same time. Billy knew the situation, and he coached me. "Just watch me," he said, "And don't make any fast moves."" On that occasion, the band was in Provost, Alberta, opening for Bryan Fustukian, the well-known DJ who had become a successful country music artist. Cowsill accepted the invitation to join Fustukian's band and stayed on for about a year, as guitarist and co-lead singer. In 1977, he moved to Vancouver.

== Vancouver, Blue Northern, 1977–1983 ==
Vancouver has always been a musical hub but, in the late ‘70s, it was bursting with new rock bands, new nightclubs and new blues venues. The two hubs for blues were The Anchor Hotel and The Yale Saloon. Cowsill rented an apartment in the former Hippie enclave of Kitsilano, and began sitting in with bands playing at The Yale's famous Sunday jam sessions. At one such session, he ran into Lee Stephens, the bass player from The Hair Trigger Cowboys. Stephens had just become part of the new country rock band Blue Northern; Cowsill began sitting in and then joined on vocals, guitar and percussion. He wrote and co-wrote some of their songs, produced their EP Blue, and co-produced their album Blue Northern. He also co-produced the 1983 album Restless Heart by the Winnipeg country singer Patti Mayo, which Blue Northern performed on. Blue Northern was a successful band—five of their songs made the national top-40 and, in 1982, they were nominated for a Canadian Country Music Award. But by then, Cowsill's addictions to drugs and alcohol had gotten the better of him. Blue Northern's members splintered off; their last performance was as part of a Christmas concert at Vancouver's Commodore Ballroom on December 23, 1982.

== Vancouver, Calgary, Billy Mitchell's Trainwreck, 1983–1986 ==
By now, Cowsill had become friends with Lindsay Mitchell, singer of the group Prism which had broken up in 1982. Cowsill and Mitchell recruited bassist Elmer Spanier, guitarist Danny Casavant, and two of The Anchor's regular musicians, pianist Doc Fingers and drummer Chris Nordquist, to form the alt-country band Billy Mitchell's Trainwreck. The band played a steady stream of gigs in Vancouver, Calgary and Edmonton, becoming popular in western Canada by performing what Cowsill described as his "Dead Guys Set"; country and pop songs by artists no longer living. At this point, Cowsill's manager was Larry Wanagas, president of Edmonton's Bumstead Records. Wanagas was also the manager of k.d. lang. Also at the time, Cowsill was mentoring the young blue guitarist Colin James, who was also playing with the band. On July 5, 1985, Wanagas had them open for lang at Calgary's Fairmont Palliser Hotel. Their concert was recorded and, in 2004, Cowsill released the performance as the album as Billy Cowsill – Live From The Crystal Ballroom Calgary, AB July, 1985.

Mitchell soon returned to the re-united Prism and Cowsill's band became Billy Cowsill and the Heartbeats. By now, Cowsill had become a fixture in Alberta. He appeared more than once on Ian Tyson's TV show Sun Country, he played every Sunday night at the Wrangler Room, and the band was a regular fixture at the Calgary clubs Slack Alice and McGees, and at Edmonton's Sidetrack Cafe. He made other television appearances on Country West and The Don Harron show. But in January 1987, he returned to Vancouver, accepting scheduled regular bookings at the Fairview Pub and the Soft Rock Cafe.

== Vancouver, The Blue Shadows, 1987–1996 ==
In 1990, Cowsill produced Year of the Rooster, the first album for the Vancouver rockabilly act, The Rattled Roosters. Cowsill also produced the initial demos for the band.

In 1992, Cowsill and Elmer Spanier reunited to form The Blue Shadows. They brought in Jeffrey Hatcher as guitarist and co-songwriter, and J.B. "Jay" Johnson on drums. While they were recording their first album, and Spanier left the band. He was replaced by Barry Muir, late of Barney Bentall and The Payolas. Hatcher had previously had his own band, Jeffrey Hatcher And The Big Beat. The new band's name, suggested by Hatcher's wife, was taken from the song "Blue Shadows On The Trail" by Sons of the Pioneers. Cowsill and Hatcher became known for their Everly Brothers-like harmonies. Cowsill regarded his association with The Blue Shadows as his most positive experience as a musician, to that point in his career.

The group was signed to Columbia Records and their first album, On The Floor of Heaven, was certified gold in Canada. Cowsill said that he considered the title track to the album to be the best song he had ever written. They generated the interest of U.S. record executives, but did not receive a U.S. record distribution contract. The group also received a 1994 Juno award nomination as Best Country Group or Duo; The Rankin Family won. The band's second album, Lucky to Me was released in 1995 and was followed by regular touring for the year thereafter. Both Blue Shadows albums were co-produced by Cowsill and Hatcher.

Having not obtained a record deal by the end of 1996, The Blue Shadows broke up, amidst "creative differences". These were, as Cowsill acknowledged, precipitated by his addictions to drugs and alcohol, which impaired his ability to contribute to songwriting meetings, band rehearsals and, ultimately, performances. The actual end of the band occurred during a layover in Ottawa, Ontario, when Cowsill crashed their van into a laundromat. They fulfilled their performance obligations, then broke up. Cowsill continued for a brief period with another band, using The Blue Shadows name. There would be increased interest in the band's music, particularly following the re-release, in 2010, of On the Floor of Heaven.

== Calgary, The Co-Dependents, 1998–2004 ==
Following the break-up of The Blue Shadows, Cowsill returned to Calgary and entered the addiction recovery program at Recovery Acres. It took him two years to completely overcome his addictions, but he remained clean for the rest of his life.

In 1988, Cowsill had produced the release Low Tech/High Torque for the Calgary rock band The Burners. Once he was sober, Cowsill started to play engagements with these same musicians—bassist Tim Leacock, guitarist and singer Steve Pineo, and drummer Ross Watson. They formally formed the band The Co-Dependents.

Cowsill also enrolled, as a full-time student, at Mount Royal College in Calgary, where he worked towards a degree in psychology, with the objective of becoming a counselor for troubled youth. Cowsill and The Co-Dependents performed as Cowsill's study schedule permitted, rather than on a full-time basis. The band played a mix of country, bluegrass, blues, rock and rockabilly music and became popular in Calgary, western Canada and the United States; They eventually had a regular weekend booking at Calgary's Mecca Café where, over three nights in June 2001, they recorded their performances. These were released by Calgary's new independent music label Indelible Music, which founded by Ian Tyson's former producer Neil MacGonigill, as Live Recording Event (2001) and Live At The Mecca Café, Volume 2 (2005). Live Recording Event was one of the most successful Alberta roots recordings at the time, staying at the top of the charts for three weeks.

During this period, Cowsill worked with other Calgary-based artists. In 2000, he produced and arranged the vocals for Sun Sittin', the debut album of Calgary hard rock band Optimal Impact--Cowsill coined the term 'Surf Metal' when asked to describe their music. In 2002, Cowsill co-produced the EP Dyin' to Go for Calgary country and blues singer, Ralph Boyd Johnson. He also appeared as a guest vocalist on various recordings, such as an album by the roots rock group The Shackshakers, and on Gary Pig Gold's 2002 Gene Pitney tribute He's A Rebel (The Gene Pitney Story Retold).

== Personal life ==
In addition to his early marriage, Cowsill had a 15-year marriage to Vancouver artist Mitzi Gibbs. They had one son, Delaney, a musician who was born in Vancouver in 1980. Gibbs died in November 2006.

Barbara Cowsill died of emphysema in February 1985, at age 56. Bud Cowsill died of leukemia in 1992. By then, Cowsill had reconciled with his father.

== Illness and death ==
In the latter years of his life, Cowsill was in declining health, suffering from emphysema, Cushing syndrome and osteoporosis. His health went into serious decline in 2004. He needed a cane to walk and underwent hip replacement surgery and three back surgeries, one of which left him with a permanently collapsed lung. That year, a benefit concert for Cowsill was held in Los Angeles, featuring The Cowsills, Peter Tork, Susanna Hoffs and Shirley Jones, among others.

Despite his health challenges, Cowsill continued to write, perform and record--he trained himself to sing with one lung. Six months before his death, he accepted an invitation to perform two songs onstage with Calgary honky-tonk singer-songwriter Tom Phillips. His last recording was "The Days I'm With The Horses", recorded in Calgary on July 18, 2005. The song was written and performed by Stewart MacDougall, and produced by Cowsill, who also sang background vocals. It is included on Rivers and Rails: A Tribute to Alberta, a compilation album by various artists, released in 2007. Cowsill also co-wrote, with Ralph Boyd Johnson and Suzanne Leacock, the title song to the album, on which he plays guitar.

He died on February 18, 2006, aged 58, at his Calgary home, survived by his two sons. Family members learned of his death while holding a memorial service the next day, in Newport, Rhode Island, for his brother Barry, who was a victim of Hurricane Katrina (his body had not been found and identified until January 2006). Bill Cowsill was cremated, and his ashes later scattered in Newport, Rhode Island. At the time of Cowsill's death, his last album with the Co-Dependents, Live at the Mecca Café, Volume 2, was the top-selling independent album in Alberta.

On April 20, 2006, a tribute concert in memory of Billy Cowsill was held at The Railway Club in Vancouver. On May 18, 2006, a memorial service for and musical tribute to Cowsill was held at Knox United Church in Calgary.

In 2009, Cowsill's last residence, at 1723 9th Street SW, Calgary, was designated a 'municipal historic resource' by the city of Calgary.

== Discography ==
The Co-Dependents

- 2005 Live at the Mecca Café, Volume 2 (Recorded 2001), Indelible
- 2001 Live Recording Event, Indelible

The Blue Shadows

- 1995 Lucky to Me Columbia
- 1994 Rockin (EP), Columbia
- 1993 On the Floor of Heaven, Columbia

Billy Mitchell's Trainwreck

- 2004 Billy Cowsill Live From The Crystal Ballroom Calgary, AB July, 1985, Indelible Music

Blue Northern

- 1980 Blue (EP), Quintessence Records
- 1981 Blue Northern, Polydor

Bridey Murphy

- 1974 "The Time Has Come", Columbia

Solo

- 1970 Nervous Breakthrough, MGM

The Cowsills

- 1971 "You (In My Mind)" / "Crystal Claps", London Records
- 1969 "Hair" / "What is Happy", MGM
- 1968 Captain Sad and His Ship of Fools, MGM
- 1968 We Can Fly, MGM
- 1967 The Cowsills, MGM

Compilation contributions

- 2007 Beautiful Dreamers: Volume 1 Alberta Sessions
- 2007 Rivers and Rails: A Tribute to Alberta
- 2006 Sorrow Bound: Hank Williams Re-Examined
- 2002 He's A Rebel: The Gene Pitney Story Retold

Guest contributions

- 2000 The Shackshakers, With Special Guests
- 1968 Opal Butterfly, Beautiful Beige, Beautiful Beige (co-writer)
- 1968 Bit 'A Sweet, Hypnotic I, "How Can I Make You See" (writer)

As a producer of other artists

- 2002 Ralph Boyd Johnson, Dyin' to Go, co-produced with Tim Williams.
- 2000 Optimal Impact, Sun Sittin'
- 1990 The Rattled Roosters, Year of the Rooster
- 1988 The Burners, Low Tech/High Torque
- 1983 Patti Mayo, Restless Heart, co-producer
