= Abbey Road on the River =

Beatles festival in the United States

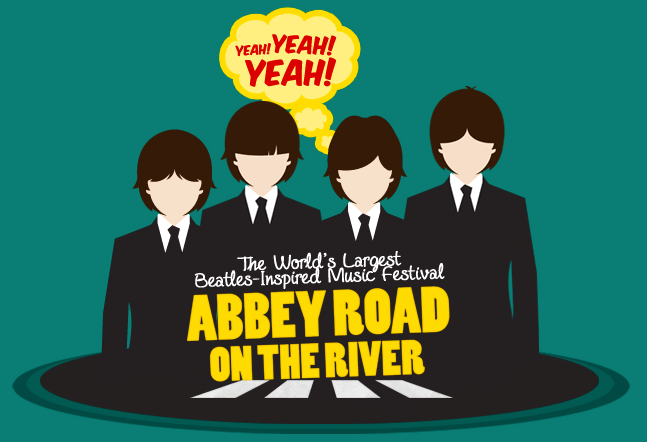
- Genre: The Beatles; classic rock
- Locations: Jeffersonville, Indiana (2017–present); Louisville, Kentucky (2005–2016); Cleveland, Ohio (2002–2004)
- Years active: 2002–present
- Founders: Gary Jacob
- Website: AROTR.com

Abbey Road on the River (AROTR) is a five-day, multi-staged music festival which was initially created to honor the music and spirit of the Beatles. The festival took place in Louisville, Kentucky, over Memorial Day weekend but moved across the Ohio River to Jeffersonville, Indiana, starting in 2017. Tribute bands, as well as internationally recognized bands, perform over the course of the festival, playing the music of the Beatles, as well as that of other artists. Abbey Road on the River is a four-time winner of the Kentucky Travel Industry Association's Top 10 Spring Festivals.

== History ==
Abbey Road on the River was founded and is produced by Cleveland resident Gary Jacob, who has produced the show since its inception.

Abbey Road on the River began with three events in Cleveland in 2002, 2003 and 2004. Following the 2004 event, Abbey Road on the River moved its main location to Louisville; it continues to be held annually in that area over Memorial Day weekend. During its tenure in Louisville, the festival took place primarily on the city's Belvedere, within and around the Muhammad Ali Center and within the event's host hotel. In 2017 it was moved across the Ohio River to Jeffersonville, Indiana, now taking place on that city's riverfront.

Due to the COVID-19 pandemic, the 2020 edition of Abbey Road on the River was first postponed til the Columbus Day long weekend in October, with its cancellation announced in August. The 2021 edition of Abbey Road on the River was scheduled for the Labor Day long weekend in September, a scaled-down Penny Lane at the Park festival having been mounted on Saturday and Sunday, May 29–30.

== Event activities and attendees ==
The types of tribute bands that perform at Abbey Road on the River vary greatly. Some bands look, sound, and act like the Beatles, while others simply play Beatles music or the solo music of John Lennon, Paul McCartney, Ringo Starr, and George Harrison.

The festival also features other Beatles-related activities, ranging from speakers, discussion panels, and film screenings, to the annual parade complete with costumes and yellow submarine, as well as Beatles merchandise for sale, along with food and drink options on the Belvedere grounds.

== Speakers, musicians, and guests ==
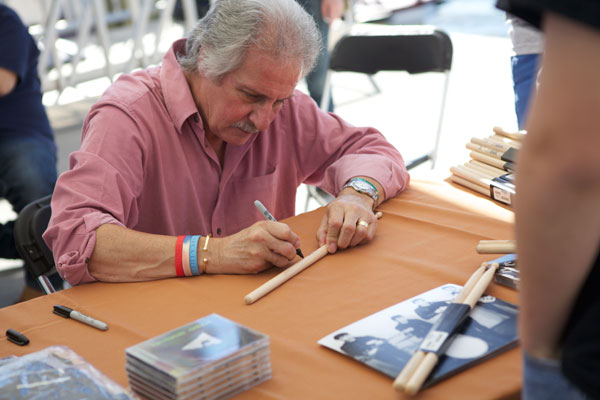
Pete Best autographs a drumstick at AROTR D.C.

Abbey Road on the River has over the years featured hosted such guest speakers and musical acts as:

- Pete Best, the Beatles' drummer prior to Ringo Starr, was a special guest speaker at Abbey Road on the River in Louisville (2006) and in Washington, D.C. (2010).
- Louise Harrison, George Harrison's sister, was a guest speaker at Abbey Road on the River 2002, 2003 and 2005. Harrison judged Beatle-themed singing competitions and spoke to an audience about her experiences with her brother and the Beatles.
- Julia Baird, John Lennon's half-sister, was a guest speaker in 2015 to celebrate John's 75th birthday.
- Georgina Flood a portrait artist from Ireland, was named resident artist of the festival in 2014 and her artwork adorns much of the festival's merchandise, posters and advertising.
- The 2013 edition of Abbey Road on the River featured former Paul McCartney and Wings band members Denny Laine, Peter Noone and Leon Russell. Laine returned in October 2014 for a special "To Sir With Love" celebration of Paul McCartney's first concert in Louisville, performing hits by Wings and his former band, the Moody Blues: "To Sir With Love" also featured Terry Sylvester of the Hollies – who had been featured at Abbey Road on the River 2010 – and Wings members Laurence Juber and Steve Holley.
- Sylvester also appeared at "To Sir with Love" in October 2014.
- Jefferson Starship was the headliner in Washington, D.C., in September 2012.
- Tony Bramwell, former Apple Records CEO, appeared in May 2013.
- The Beach Boys, Ambrosia, John Sebastian, and Laurence Juber appeared in May 2014. Juber also appeared at "To Sir With Love" in October 2014.
- Former ELO members Mik Kaminski and Louis Clark appeared with The Orchestra in May 2015.
- The Buckinghams, the Cowsills and the Grass Roots were guest performers at Abbey Road on the River 2019, at which Peter Asher of Peter and Gordon who was close friends with the Beatles was as a guest performer and speaker.
- Felix Cavaliere's Rascals and the Zombies in 2016.
- Jake Clemons, the Grass Roots, Herman's Hermits starring Peter Noone, Mark Lindsay, and the Family Stone (featuring Greg Errico, Cynthia Harrison, and Jerry Martini) were guest performers at Abbey Road on the River 2017.
- America and Vanilla Fudge were guest performers at Abbey Road on the River 2018, at which Geoff Emerick, the sound engineer on several Beatles albums (including Abbey Road), was a guest speaker.

== Music ==
From its beginnings as a small tribute festival, Abbey Road on the River has evolved into a mixed-genre and mixed-media event, with some concerts targeting full albums of the Beatles and various artists such as the Who, to entire concerts devoted to the music of artists of the era, such as Bruce Springsteen. In recent years, other top bands of the era have joined Abbey Road and have performed their own music. These include Jefferson Starship, Peter Noone and Herman's Hermits, Leon Russell, the Beach Boys, Ambrosia, and the Orchestra, with Felix Cavaliere's Rascals and the Zombies joining in 2016.

== See also ==
- List of attractions and events in the Louisville metropolitan area
