= The Rain, the Park & Other Things =

"The Rain, The Park & Other Things"
- US release

Single by The Cowsills

from the album The Cowsills
- B-side: "River Blue"
- Released: September 1967
- Recorded: August 17, 1967
- Studio: A&R Recording Studios, New York City
- Genre: Sunshine pop; bubblegum pop
- Length: 3:04
- Label: MGM
- Songwriters: Artie Kornfeld, Steve Duboff
- Producer: Artie Kornfeld

The Cowsills singles chronology
"A Most Peculiar Man" (1966)	"The Rain, The Park & Other Things" (1967)	"We Can Fly" (1968)

"The Rain, the Park & Other Things" is a pop song with music and lyrics co-written by Artie Kornfeld and Steve Duboff. It was recorded by the pop band the Cowsills, and included on their 1967 self-titled debut album. Released as a single, the song reached No. 2 on the Billboard charts. It was kept from the No. 1 spot by "Daydream Believer" by the Monkees. The single cemented the group's international popularity and sold some three million copies over the years. It ties with 1969's "Hair" as the group's biggest hit, as both reached No. 2 in the US. "The Rain, the Park & Other Things" also reached No. 1 on the US Cash Box Top 100 and Canada's RPM singles chart.

== Recording ==
The song was written by Kornfeld and Duboff specifically for the Cowsills; Bob Cowsill said Kornfeld told him they had written it in two hours.

The Cowsills did not play on their earliest recordings. Studio musicians were brought in to provide the music for this song and many of the earlier singles. For this record, the arranger was Jimmy Wisner. Musicians included Gene Bianco on harp, Vinnie Bell, Charles Macy and Al Gorgoni on guitar, Joe Macho on bass, Artie Butler on organ, Paul Griffin on piano, George Devens on percussion, and Buddy Saltzman and Al Rogers on drums.

Kornfeld had planned to use the sound of a rainstorm as the song's intro, but recordings of real rain proved to be too faint to hear on record; instead he used a stock sound of sizzling bacon to emulate rain.

Originally recorded in late 1966, with Bill Cowsill on lead vocals, the backing vocals of his mother, Barbara, were added onto the finished product after the initial sessions, at Kornfeld's suggestion. The song was originally recorded at A&R Studios in New York with Brooks Arthur engineering the session.

The song is known by many as "The Flower Girl". That was its original title, but MGM Records president Mort Nasatir suggested that the title be changed in order to avoid confusion with Scott McKenzie's contemporaneous hit single "San Francisco (Be Sure to Wear Flowers in Your Hair)". The new title was coined by Kornfeld.

== Lyrical content ==
In the song, the narrator states that he saw a flower girl sitting in the rain, said hello, and took a lovely walk in the park until, when the rain stops and the sun breaks through, she disappears. However, the narrator still feels happy about the flower girl, and asks in the final verse: "Was she reality, or just a dream to me?"

The song was used in Lloyd's fantasy scene in the 1994 film Dumb and Dumber.

== Charts ==
=== Weekly charts ===
Chart (1967–1968)	Peak position
Australia (Kent Music Report)	4
Canada (RPM)	1
New Zealand	2
US Billboard Hot 100	2
US Cash Box Top 100	1

=== Year-end charts ===
Chart (1967)	Rank
Canada (RPM)	8
US Billboard Hot 100	49
US Cash Box Top 100	31
