= Indian Lake (song) =

Single by The Cowsills

from the album Captain Sad and His Ship of Fools
- B-side: "Newspaper Blanket"
- Released: May 1968
- Genre: Bubblegum
- Label: MGM
- Songwriter: Tony Romeo
- Producer: Wes Farrell

The Cowsills singles chronology
"In Need of a Friend" (1968)	"Indian Lake" (1968)	"Poor Baby" (1968)

"Indian Lake" is a song with music and lyrics written by Tony Romeo. It was recorded by the pop band The Cowsills, and included on their 1968 album Captain Sad and His Ship of Fools (MGM E/SE-4554). Released as a single, the song reached No. 10 on the Billboard Hot 100, while reaching No. 6 on the Cash Box Top 100, and No. 3 on Canada's RPM 100. The song was ranked as the No. 51 Single of 1968 by Cashbox magazine in its year-ending December 28, 1968 issue. The single eventually sold over 1 million copies, and was later licensed for use in commercials for the Dodge Charger.

== Chart performance ==
=== Weekly charts ===
Chart (1968)	Peak position
Australia Go-Set National Top 40	3
Australia KMR	3
Canada RPM 100	3
New Zealand - NZ Listener	1
South Africa (Springbok)	4
US Billboard Hot 100	10
US Billboard Easy Listening	17
US Cash Box Top 100	6

=== Year-end charts ===
Chart (1968)	Rank
Australia (Go-Set)	24
Canada RPM 100	56
US Billboard Hot 100	71
US Cash Box	51

== Cover versions ==
- Freddy Weller recorded the song in 1971 (U.S. No.108) and took it to No. 3 on Billboard's Hot Country Singles chart.
- Jan & Dean included it on their 1985 album Silver Summer.
