= The Blue Shadows =

Canadian alt-country band

- Origin: Vancouver, British Columbia, Canada
- Genres: Alternative country
- Years active: 1992-1996
- Labels: Columbia Records, Sony Music, Bumstead Records
- Past members: Billy Cowsill; Jeffrey Hatcher; J.B. "Jay" Johnson; Barry Muir; Elmar Spanier

The Blue Shadows was a Canadian alt-country band founded in Vancouver, and active between 1992 and 1996. They released two albums in Canada.

== History ==
The band was formed by Billy Cowsill and Elmar Spanier, who had been performing, with Lindsay Mitchell of Prism, as Billy Mitchell's Trainwreck. On July 5, 1985, they opened for k.d. lang at Calgary's Fairmont Palliser Hotel. Their concert, which included an appearance Cowsill's protege Colin James, was recorded and, in 2004, Cowsill released that album as Billy Cowsill – Live From The Crystal Ballroom Calgary, AB July, 1985.

When Cowsill and Spanier eventually formed a final line-up, it was with Jeffrey Hatcher joining Cowsill as guitarist and principal songwriter, with Spanier on bass and J.B. "Jay" Johnson on drums. They began to record their first album, and Spanier left the band. He was replaced by Barry Muir, late of Barney Bentall and The Payolas. Hatcher had previously had his own band, Jeffrey Hatcher And The Big Beat. The new band's name, 'The Blue Shadows', was suggested by Hatcher's wife, based on the song "Blue Shadows On The Trail" by Sons of the Pioneers. The group was initially managed by Larry Wanagas and David Chesney, who also managed k.d. lang and owned Bumstead Records, through which lang's early recordings were released.

The group was signed to Columbia Records and their first album, On The Floor of Heaven, was certified gold in Canada. Cowsill said that he considered the title track to the album to be the best song he had ever written. They generated the interest of U.S. record executives, but did not receive a U.S. record distribution contract. The group also received a 1994 Juno award nomination as Best Country Group or Duo; The Rankin Family won. The band's second album, Lucky to Me was released in 1995 and was followed by regular touring by the band for the year thereafter. Both Blue Shadows albums were co-produced by Cowsill and Hatcher.

Having not obtained international record distribution by the end of 1996, The Blue Shadows broke up, amidst "creative differences" which were, as Cowsill acknowledged, precipitated by his addictions to drugs and alcohol, which impaired his ability to contribute to songwriting meetings, band rehearsals and, ultimately, performances. The actual end of the band occurred during a layover in Ottawa, Ontario, when Cowsill crashed their van into a laundromat. They fulfilled their performance obligations, then brokeup. Cowsill continued for a brief period with another band, using The Blue Shadows name.

== Reissues ==
There has been increased interest in the band's music, particularly following the re-release, in 2010, of On The Floor of Heaven. The album was re-released on Bumstead Records, owned by the band's original manager, Larry Wanagas. The re-release included a second CD of outtakes during the band's career, including cover versions of Joni Mitchell's "Raised on Robbery", Michel Pagliaro's "What The Hell I Got" and Merle Haggard's "If We Make It Through December". The re-release was also the first occasion when the band's music was also released in the United States. One of Cowsill's final wishes, prior to his 2006 death, was that On The Floor of Heaven would be re-released and be appreciated by a wider audience.

During the 1990s, The Blue Shadows made a professional live recording for CBC, which was played on the radio and televised as part of a strategy to promote their studio releases. This live recording is highly regarded by fans who heard the radio broadcast or watched the television special. The performance was later showcased on the archive portion of the CBC website, to coincide with the Deluxe Edition reissue of "On The Floor Of Heaven" in 2010. One reissue record label expressed interest in releasing this concert on CD as a bonus disc packaged with a reissue of the studio album "Lucky To Me," although the project was scrapped when the label unexpectedly closed its operations.

Both studio albums, including "Lucky To Me" and the 2010 Deluxe Edition reissue for "On The Floor Of Heaven," have become out of print on CD and are considered to be collector's items.

In 2023, A.V.R.A. Records obtained rights to digitally reissue their catalog.

== Discography ==
Albums

- On The Floor Of Heaven (1993), Columbia Records (re-issued 2010, Bumstead Records)
- Rockin' (1994, compilation), Columbia Records, Sony Music
- Lucky To Me (1995), Columbia Records

Singles

- "Coming On Strong" / "Hell Stays Open All Night Long" (1993), Columbia Records
- "Deliver Me" / "The Fool Is The Last One To Know" (1994), Columbia Records
- "(Born to Be) Riding Only Down" (1995), Columbia Records
