= Hair (Hair song) =

1968 song by Galt MacDermot

- 1969 French single release

Song by Original Broadway cast

from the album Hair
- A-side: "Aquarius"
- Released: 1968
- Recorded: May 6, 1968
- Genre: Rock; pop rock
- Length: 2:55
- Label: RCA Victor
- Composer: Galt MacDermot
- Lyricists: James Rado; Gerome Ragni
- Producers: Brian Drutman; Denis McNamara; Norrie Paramor; Andy Wiswell

"Hair" is the title song to the 1967 musical Hair and the 1979 film adaptation of the musical.

== Context in the musical ==
The musical’s title song begins as character Claude slowly croons his reason for his long hair, as tribe-mate Berger joins in singing they "don't know." They lead the tribe, singing "Give me a head with hair," "as long as God can grow it," listing what they want in a head of hair and their uses for it. Later the song takes the tune of "The Star-Spangled Banner" with the tribe punning "Oh say can you see/ My eyes if you can/Then my hair’s too short!" Claude and Berger’s religious references continue with many a "Hallelujah" as they consciously compare their hair to Jesus’s, and if Mary loved her son, "why don’t my mother love me?" The song shows the Tribe's enthusiasm and pride for their hair as well as comparing Claude to a Jesus figure.

== The Cowsills version ==
"Hair"

Single by The Cowsills

from the album The Cowsills in Concert
- B-side: "What Is Happy?"
- Released: March 1969
- Recorded: October 1968
- Studio: Cleveland, Ohio
- Genre: Pop rock; bubblegum pop
- Length: 3:32
- Label: MGM
- Composer: Galt MacDermot
- Lyricists: James Rado; Gerome Ragni
- Producers: Bob Cowsill; Bill Cowsill

The Cowsills singles chronology
"The Impossible Years" (1968)	"Hair" (1969)	"The Prophecy of Daniel and John the Divine" (1969)

The song was a major hit for the Cowsills in 1969 and tied with "The Rain, the Park & Other Things" as their most successful single. The Cowsills' version cuts out most of the religion-themed lyrics, changing "long as God can grow it" to "long as I can grow it" and removing some verses. Their version spent two weeks at number one on the Cash Box Top 100 and reached number two on the Billboard Hot 100. "Hair" was kept out of the number-one spot by another song from the Hair cast album: "Aquarius/Let the Sunshine In" by The 5th Dimension. It also reached number one on the RPM Canadian Singles Chart.

=== Charts ===
==== Weekly charts ====
Chart (1969)	Peak position
Australia KMR	1
Canada Top Singles (RPM)	1
Canada RPM Adult Contemporary	12
New Zealand	1
South Africa (Springbok Radio)	1
US Billboard Hot 100	2
US Billboard Adult Contemporary	19
US Cash Box Top 100ref>"Cash Box Top 100 5/17/69". tropicalglen.com. Archived from the original on 2 October 2016.</ref>	1

==== Year-end charts ====
Chart (1969)	Rank
Canada	14
South Africa	20
US Billboard Hot 100	13
US Cash Box Top 100	10

== Other versions ==
"Hair" was also covered in Australia in 1969 and released as a single by Doug Parkinson in Focus (B-side with "Without You") and was a top ten hit for him there that year.

A version by Dutch rock band Zen reached the top of the Dutch Top 40 in January 1969. A cover was released as a B-side by girl group Gilded Cage in 1969.
