= Joy to the World: Their Greatest Hits =

Greatest hits album by Three Dog Night
- Released: November 1974
- Genre: Rock
- Length: 47:15
- Label: Dunhill
- Producer: Jimmy Ienner; Gabriel Mekler; Richard Podolor

Three Dog Night chronology
Hard Labor (1974)	Joy to the World: Their Greatest Hits (1974)	Coming Down Your Way (1975)

Joy to the World: Their Greatest Hits is the twelfth album by American rock band, Three Dog Night, released in 1974.

== Release ==
Joy to the World is the follow-up compilation to Golden Bisquits, consisting of eleven (out of twelve) charted hits from the group's previous four studio albums (the top 20 hit "Pieces of April" was left off for reasons unknown), two charted hits that already appeared on their first greatest hits compilation ("One" and "One Man Band"), and non-charting B-side "I'd Be So Happy". In 1981 the album was reissued on MCA Records with issue number MCA-37120.

== Critical reception ==
Professional ratings
Review scores
Source	Rating
AllMusic	link
Christgau's Record Guide	B+

Reviewing in Christgau's Record Guide: Rock Albums of the Seventies (1981), Robert Christgau wrote: "Things seem to be winding up for the Kings of Oversing, but this fourteen-song compilation demonstrates that the singles, unlike the albums, didn't diminish much. It also suggests that though they're praised when at all for translating weirdos like Nilsson and Newman into AM, they also deserve credit for preserving the odd goody (two apiece) by the likes of Paul Williams and Hoyt Axton. Only Lighthouse keeper Skip Prokop proves beyond help."

== Track listing ==
Side 1
No.	Title	Writer(s)	Original album	Length
1.	"Joy To The World"	Hoyt Axton	Naturally, November 1970	3:50
2.	"One"	Harry Nilsson	Three Dog Night, October 1968	3:04
3.	"Sure As I'm Sittin' Here" (Edited single version)	John Hiatt	Hard Labor, March 1974	3:06
4.	"An Old Fashioned Love Song" (Single version)	Paul Williams	Harmony, September 1971	3:21
5.	"Let Me Serenade You"	John Finley	Cyan, October 1973	3:04
6.	"Shambala"	Daniel Moore	Cyan	3:22
7.	"Black and White"	David I. Arkin, Earl Robinson	Seven Separate Fools, March 1972	3:47

Side 2
No.	Title	Writer(s)	Original album	Length
1.	"Never Been to Spain"	Hoyt Axton	Harmony	3:43
2.	"One Man Band"	Billy Fox, January Tyme, Tommy Kaye	Naturally	2:49
3.	"Play Something Sweet (Brickyard Blues)" (Edited single version)	Allen Toussaint	Hard Labor	3:34
4.	"I'd Be So Happy" (Edited single version)	Skip Prokop	Hard Labor	3:44
5.	"Liar" (Newly edited version of stereo album mix)	Russ Ballard	Naturally	3:04
6.	"The Family of Man"	Paul Williams, Jack Conrad	Harmony	3:10
7.	"The Show Must Go On" (Single version)	David Courtney, Leo Sayer	Hard Labor	3:37

== Personnel ==
- Mike Allsup - banjo, guitar
- Jimmy Greenspoon - keyboards
- Danny Hutton - vocals
- Skip Konte - keyboards on "The Show Must Go On", "Sure As I'm Sittin' Here", "Play Something Sweet" and "I'd Be So Happy"
- Chuck Negron - vocals
- Joe Schermie - bass guitar except as indicated below
- Jack Ryland - bass guitar on "Shambala", "Let Me Serenade You", "The Show Must Go On", "Sure As I'm Sittin' Here", "Play Something Sweet" and "I'd Be So Happy"
- Floyd Sneed - drums, percussion
- Cory Wells - vocals

Production

- Producers: Jimmy Ienner, Gabriel Mekler, Richard Podolor

== Charts ==
Album - Billboard (United States)

Year	Chart	Position
1975	Pop Albums	15

== Certifications ==
Region	Certification	Certified units/sales
United States (RIAA)	Gold	500,000^{^}
^{^} Shipments figures based on certification alone.
