= Blues Image (album) =

Studio album by Blues Image
- Released: July 1969
- Studio: Wally Heider Studios, San Francisco
- Genre: Rock
- Label: Atco
- Producer: Bill Halverson

Blues Image chronology
Blues Image (1969)	Open (1970)

Professional ratings
Review scores
Source	Rating
Allmusic	link

Blues Image is the debut album of the rock band Blues Image. The album was released in 1969 and peaked at #112 on the Billboard charts.

== Track listing ==
All tracks composed and arranged by Blues Image

1. "Take Me to the Sunrise" - 4:10
2. "Leaving My Troubles Behind" - 3:45
3. "Outside Was Night" - 3:44
4. "In Front Behind You" - 3:10
5. "Lay Your Sweet Love on Me" - 2:12
6. "(Do You Have) Somethin' to Say" - 3:55
7. "Lazy Day Blues" - 4:50
8. "Yesterday Could Be Today" - 2:08
9. "Reality Does Not Inspire" - 9:08

== Personnel ==
Blues Image

- Mike Pinera – guitar; lead vocals (tracks 1, 3–9); backing vocals (track 2)
- Skip Konte – piano, organ; backing vocals (track 3)
- Malcolm Jones - bass
- Manuel Bertematti – drums
- Joe Lala - congas; lead vocals (tracks 1, 2); backing vocals (track 3, 5)
