= Open (Blues Image album) =

Studio album by Blues Image
- Released: April 1970
- Studio: American Recording Co., Studio City, California
- Genre: Hard rock, blues rock
- Length: 37:02
- Label: Atco
- Producer: Richard Podolor

Blues Image chronology
Blues Image (1969)	Open (1970)	Red White & Blues Image (1970)

Singles from Open
- 1. "Ride Captain Ride" Released: April 1970

Professional ratings
Review scores
Source	Rating
Allmusic	link
The Village Voice	C+

Open is Blues Image's second album and most acclaimed album, which featured the No. 4 hit single, "Ride Captain Ride".

== Critical reception ==
Robert Christgau, writing in The Village Voice, wrote in a contemporary review: "Great single, mediocre (though improved) album. Do we really need another 'Parchman Farm?'"

== Track listing ==
All songs composed and arranged by Blues Image; except where noted.

1. "Love Is the Answer" – 2:35
2. "Running the Water" – 2:37
3. "Clean Love" – 7:49
4. "La Bamba" (Traditional; arranged by Blues Image) – 2:26
5. "Consuelate" – 1:15
6. "Ride Captain Ride" – 3:46
7. "Pay My Dues" – 3:49
8. "Fugue U" – 0:50
9. "Parchman Farm" (Mose Allison) – 2:49
10. "Wrath of Daisey" – 1:31
11. "Take Me" – 7:35

== Personnel ==
Blues Image

- Mike Pinera – lead guitar, lead vocals
- Skip Konte – keyboards
- Malcolm Jones – bass
- Manny Bertematti – drums
- Joe Lala – percussion, backing vocals

Additional personnel

- Kent Henry – guitars
