= Farmingdale, New York =

- Village
- Incorporated Village of Farmingdale
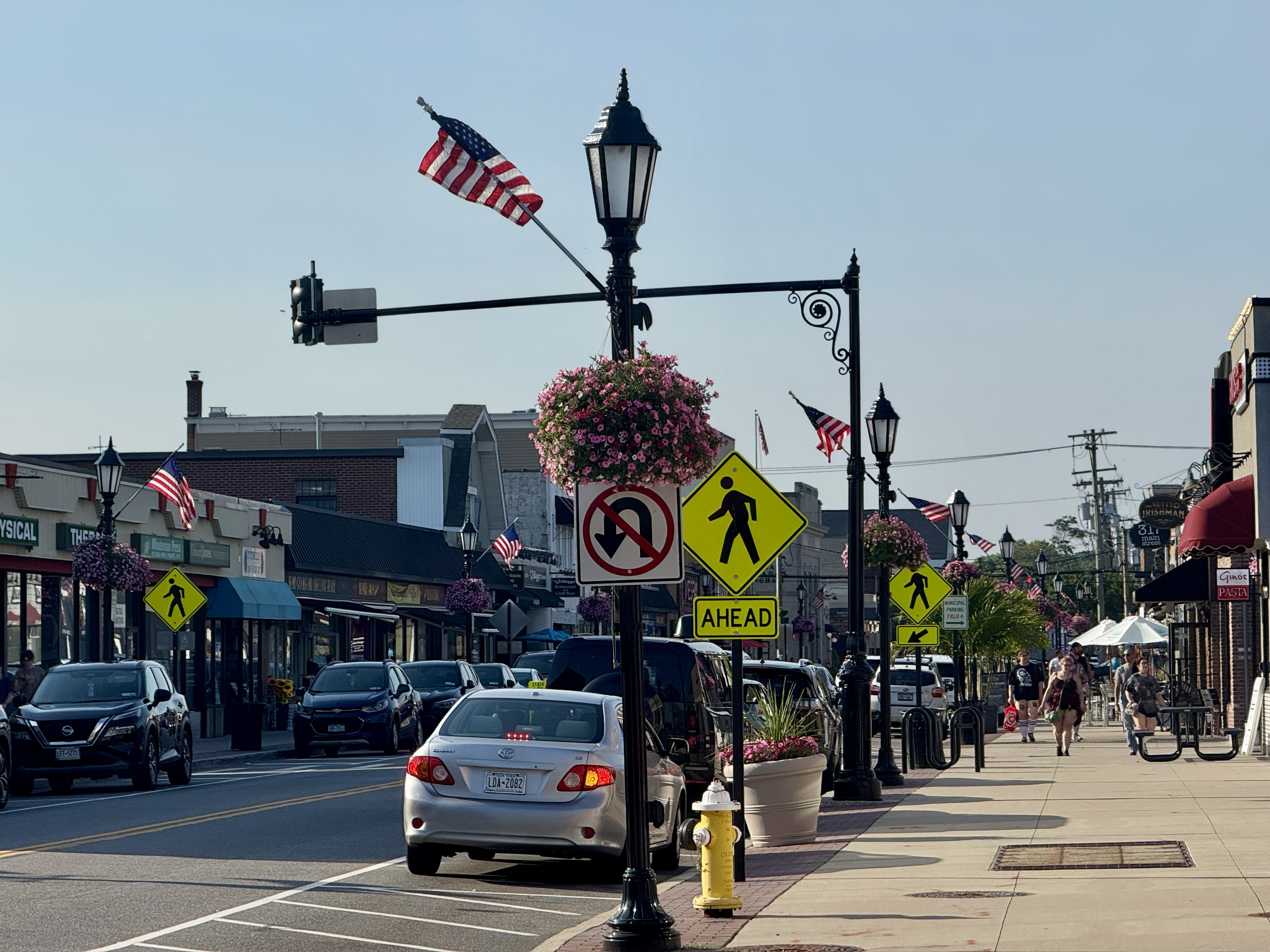
- Main Street in Farmingdale's downtown in 2025

- Flag Seal
- Nicknames: "Farmingdale Village", "The Village"
- Location in Nassau County and the state of New York

- Location on Long Island Location within the state of New York
- Coordinates: 40°44′0″N 73°26′42″W
- Country: United States
- State: New York
- County: Nassau
- Town: Oyster Bay
- Incorporated: 1904

Government
  - Mayor: Ralph Ekstrand
  - Deputy Mayor: William Barrett

Area
  - Total: 1.09 sq mi (2.83 km^{2})
  - Land: 1.09 sq mi (2.83 km^{2})
  - Water: 0 sq mi (0.00 km^{2})
- Elevation: 69 ft (21 m)

Population (2020)
  - Total: 8,466
  - Density: 7,737.4/sq mi (2,987.43/km^{2})
- Time zone: UTC−5 (Eastern (EST))
  - Summer (DST): UTC−4 (EDT)
- ZIP Code: 11735
- Area codes: 516, 363
- FIPS code: 36-25384
- GNIS feature ID: 0949918
- Website: farmingdalevillage.gov

Farmingdale is an incorporated village located within the Town of Oyster Bay in Nassau County, on Long Island, New York, United States. It is considered the anchor community of the Greater Farmingdale area. The population was 8,466 at the time of the 2020 census.

The Incorporated Village of Farmingdale is located approximately 37 miles (60 km) to the southeast of Midtown Manhattan.

== History ==
The first European settler in the area was Thomas Powell, who arrived in 1687. On October 18, 1695, he purchased a 15-square-mile (39 km^{2}) tract of land from three Native American tribes. This is known as the Bethpage Purchase and includes what is now Farmingdale – in addition to Bethpage, Melville, North Massapequa, Old Bethpage, Plainedge, and Plainview. One of two houses he erected in the area (built c. 1738) still stands on Merritts Road within Farmingdale.

In the 1830s, anticipating construction of the Long Island Rail Road, land developer Ambrose George purchased a large tract of land between a community then known as Bethpage (now Old Bethpage) and an area in Suffolk County known as Hardscrabble. He built a general store in the western part of this property which he named Farmingdale. When the LIRR started service to the area in October 1841, it named its new station in the community as Farmingdale, on the line it was building to Greenport. Stagecoaches took people from the Farmingdale station to Islip, Babylon, Patchogue, Oyster Bay South, and West Neck (Huntington area).

In 1886 a fire department was organized, and in 1899, Mile-a-Minute Murphy rode a bicycle along the Long Island Rail Road's Central Branch through the Farmingdale area at a mile a minute. For many years, the town celebrated its birth with the annual Hardscrabble Fair, with music, food and games. It was normally held in May.

In 1904, Farmingdale incorporated as a village, after locals voted in favor of doing so through a referendum.

The Lenox Hills Country Club – an 18-hole private golf course designed by Devereux Emmet – was developed north of the community in 1923 and was owned and operated by Benjamin F. Yoakum. This golf course was purchased by the State of New York, was greatly expanded, and then re-opened as Bethpage State Park in 1932, with much of the golf design work carried out by golf architect A.W. Tillinghast, later inducted into the World Golf Hall of Fame. The 1920s-built Lenox Hills section and later, adjacent subdivisions – located between the Bethpage State Park golf courses and the Long Island Railroad trackage, encompassing rolling hills and a wide boulevard – are known as the more upscale part of Farmingdale Village.

About the time of World War II, the Farmingdale area became a locus for the aircraft industry, notably Republic Aviation Company, which was based at just east of the Village of Farmingdale at Republic Airport, located within the adjacent hamlet of East Farmingdale.

== Geography ==
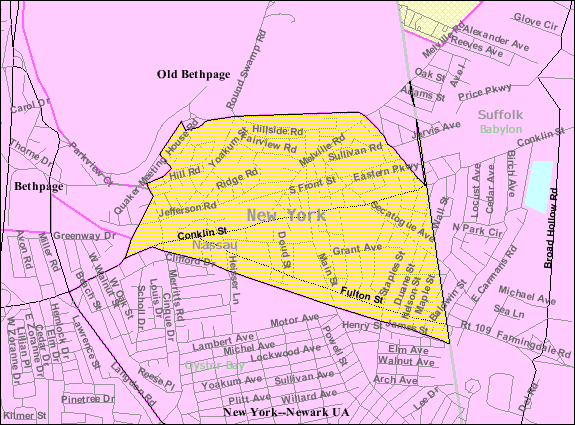
U.S. Census map of Farmingdale

According to the United States Census Bureau, the village has a total area of 1.1 square miles (2.8 km^{2}), all land.

Between the 1990 Census and the 2000 census, the village gained territory.

The Lenox Hills section of the village is adjacent to Bethpage State Park. The rest of the municipality is within a fifteen-minute drive thereto.

=== Topography and drainage ===
The Village of Farmingdale is located on a flat outwash plain, and as such, the area's topography is largely flat.

Additionally, Farmingdale is split between the Massapequa Creek and Seaford Creek drainage areas, and is located within the larger Long Island Sound/Atlantic Ocean Watershed.

=== Climate ===
According to the Köppen Climate Classification system, Farmingdale has a humid subtropical climate, abbreviated "Cfa" on climate maps. The hottest temperature recorded in Farmingdale was 102 °F (38.9 °C) on July 6, 2010, and July 22, 2011, while the coldest temperature recorded was −1 °F (−18.3 °C) on January 4, 2014.

Climate data for Farmingdale, New York (Republic Airport), 1991–2020 normals, extremes 1999–present
Month	Jan	Feb	Mar	Apr	May	Jun	Jul	Aug	Sep	Oct	Nov	Dec	Year
Record high °F (°C)	71 (22)	70 (21)	82 (28)	91 (33)	93 (34)	96 (36)	102 (39)	100 (38)	94 (34)	90 (32)	79 (26)	69 (21)	102 (39)
Mean maximum °F (°C)	58.5 (14.7)	58.0 (14.4)	67.1 (19.5)	76.9 (24.9)	84.9 (29.4)	89.8 (32.1)	94.5 (34.7)	91.3 (32.9)	87.0 (30.6)	79.6 (26.4)	68.5 (20.3)	61.2 (16.2)	95.5 (35.3)
Mean daily maximum °F (°C)	38.9 (3.8)	41.3 (5.2)	48.1 (8.9)	58.4 (14.7)	68.1 (20.1)	77.2 (25.1)	82.8 (28.2)	81.5 (27.5)	74.8 (23.8)	63.9 (17.7)	53.4 (11.9)	44.2 (6.8)	61.1 (16.1)
Daily mean °F (°C)	32.0 (0.0)	33.9 (1.1)	40.4 (4.7)	50.2 (10.1)	59.7 (15.4)	69.1 (20.6)	75.3 (24.1)	74.1 (23.4)	67.2 (19.6)	56.1 (13.4)	45.9 (7.7)	37.5 (3.1)	53.4 (11.9)
Mean daily minimum °F (°C)	25.1 (−3.8)	26.4 (−3.1)	32.7 (0.4)	41.9 (5.5)	51.4 (10.8)	61.1 (16.2)	67.8 (19.9)	66.7 (19.3)	59.6 (15.3)	48.3 (9.1)	38.4 (3.6)	30.8 (−0.7)	45.8 (7.7)
Mean minimum °F (°C)	8.1 (−13.3)	11.3 (−11.5)	19.5 (−6.9)	30.8 (−0.7)	41.2 (5.1)	50.7 (10.4)	60.6 (15.9)	58.3 (14.6)	48.3 (9.1)	34.9 (1.6)	25.0 (−3.9)	18.7 (−7.4)	6.8 (−14.0)
Record low °F (°C)	−1 (−18)	2 (−17)	9 (−13)	24 (−4)	34 (1)	46 (8)	53 (12)	53 (12)	41 (5)	31 (−1)	14 (−10)	8 (−13)	−1 (−18)
Average precipitation inches (mm)	2.69 (68)	2.03 (52)	3.46 (88)	3.61 (92)	3.18 (81)	3.45 (88)	3.05 (77)	3.25 (83)	3.66 (93)	3.37 (86)	2.93 (74)	3.60 (91)	38.28 (973)
Average precipitation days (≥ 0.01 in)	9.3	8.7	9.9	11.2	12.6	10.9	9.9	9.6	8.1	9.9	9.2	10.7	120.0
Source 1: NOAA (mean maxima/minima 2006–2020)
Source 2: National Weather Service

=== Greater Farmingdale area ===
Farmingdale is also associated with several unincorporated areas outside the village limits, including South Farmingdale (also in the Town of Oyster Bay), and East Farmingdale (in the Town of Babylon, within Suffolk County). Many nearby places not within the village limits have Farmingdale as their postal address and the same 11735 ZIP code. Residents of East Farmingdale must use Farmingdale as their mailing address, while residents of South Farmingdale can use either Farmingdale or South Farmingdale. Bethpage State Park, which is mostly in Old Bethpage, also has a Farmingdale mailing address. Farmingdale Union Free School District (UFSD 22) includes parts of both Nassau County and Suffolk County and the southernmost part of Bethpage State Park, where the clubhouse is located. Farmingdale State College and Republic Airport are in East Farmingdale, both with Farmingdale mailing addresses.

== Demographics ==
Historical population
Census	Pop.	Note	%±
1880	524		—
1910	1,567		—
1920	2,091		33.4%
1930	3,373		61.3%
1940	3,524		4.5%
1950	4,492		27.5%
1960	6,128		36.4%
1970	9,297		51.7%
1980	7,946		−14.5%
1990	8,022		1.0%
2000	8,399		4.7%
2010	8,189		−2.5%
2020	8,466		3.4%
U.S. Decennial Census

=== Racial and ethnic composition ===
Farmingdale village, New York – Racial and ethnic composition Note: the US Census treats Hispanic/Latino as an ethnic category. This table excludes Latinos from the racial categories and assigns them to a separate category. Hispanics/Latinos may be of any race.
Race / Ethnicity (NH = Non-Hispanic)	Pop 2000	Pop 2010	Pop 2020	% 2000	% 2010	% 2020
White alone (NH)	6,789	6,315	6,019	80.83%	77.12%	71.10%
Black or African American alone (NH)	116	199	280	1.38%	2.43%	3.31%
Native American or Alaska Native alone (NH)	4	6	9	0.05%	0.07%	0.11%
Asian alone (NH)	311	445	618	3.70%	5.43%	7.30%
Native Hawaiian or Pacific Islander alone (NH)	0	0	0	0.00%	0.00%	0.00%
Other race alone (NH)	26	23	61	0.31%	0.28%	0.72%
Mixed race or Multiracial (NH)	97	79	188	1.15%	0.96%	2.22%
Hispanic or Latino (any race)	1,056	1,122	1,291	12.57%	13.70%	15.25%
Total	8,399	8,189	8,466	100.00%	100.00%	100.00%

=== 2020 census ===
As of the 2020 census, Farmingdale had a population of 8,466. The median age was 45.0 years. 15.0% of residents were under the age of 18 and 20.7% of residents were 65 years of age or older. For every 100 females there were 94.0 males, and for every 100 females age 18 and over there were 91.2 males age 18 and over.

100.0% of residents lived in urban areas, while 0.0% lived in rural areas.

There were 3,627 households in Farmingdale, of which 21.5% had children under the age of 18 living in them. Of all households, 41.0% were married-couple households, 21.2% were households with a male householder and no spouse or partner present, and 30.8% were households with a female householder and no spouse or partner present. About 35.9% of all households were made up of individuals and 14.4% had someone living alone who was 65 years of age or older.

There were 3,868 housing units, of which 6.2% were vacant. The homeowner vacancy rate was 0.8% and the rental vacancy rate was 6.7%.

=== 2010 Census ===
As of the 2010 census The population of the village was 88.2% White, 71.1% Non-Hispanic White, 2.6% African American, 0.4% Native American, 2.5% Asian, 0.0% Pacific Islander, 4.7% from other races, and 1.7% from two or more races. Hispanic or Latino of any race were 13.7% of the population.

=== 2000 Census ===
At the 2000 census there were 8,399 people, 3,216 households, and 2,051 families in the village. The population density was 7,432.2 inhabitants per square mile (2,869.6/km^{2}). There were 3,289 housing units at an average density of 2,910.4 per square mile (1,123.7/km^{2}). The racial makup of the village was 87.03% White, 1.61% African American, 0.12% Native American, 3.70% Asian, 0.05% Pacific Islander, 5.06% from other races, and 2.43% from two or more races. Hispanic or Latino of any race were 12.57%.

Of the 3,216 households 28.3% had children under the age of 18 living with them, 50.2% were married couples living together, 9.5% had a female householder with no husband present, and 36.2% were non-families. 29.8% of households were one person and 11.5% were one person aged 65 or older. The average household size was 2.55 and the average family size was 3.19.

The age distribution was 21.2% under the age of 18, 7.3% from 18 to 24, 35.2% from 25 to 44, 21.6% from 45 to 64, and 14.7% 65 or older. The median age was 38 years. For every 100 females, there were 95.2 males. For every 100 females age 18 and over, there were 92.5 males.

The median household income was $58,411 and the median family income was $68,235. Males had a median income of $46,104 versus $36,021 for females. The per capita income for the village was $27,492. About 3.0% of families and 5.6% of the population were below the poverty line, including 3.5% of those under age 18 and 13.0% of those age 65 or over.

== Government ==
=== Village government ===
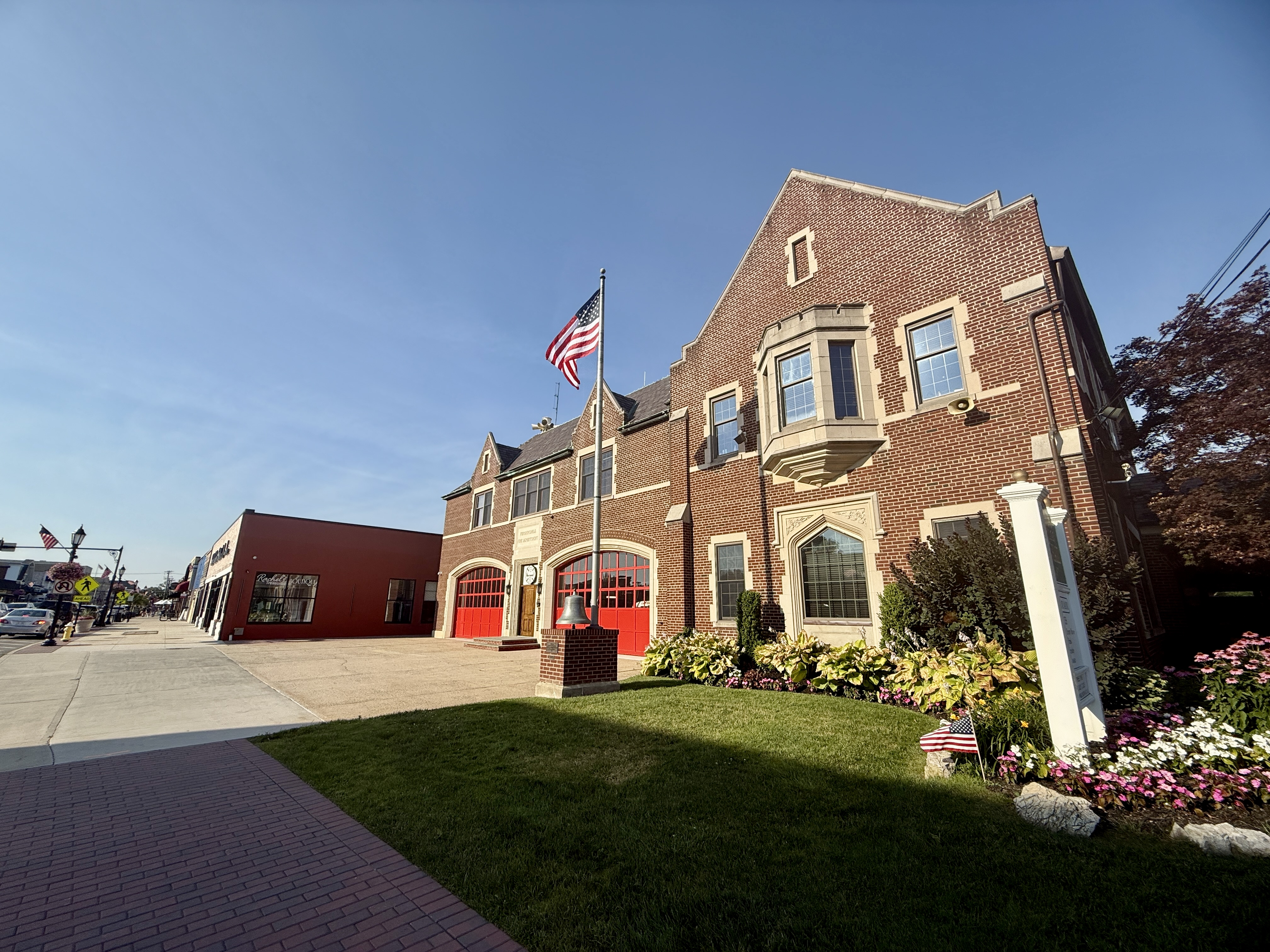
The Farmingdale Municipal Building – which houses the village's local government and fire department – in 2025

As of July 2023, the Mayor of Farmingdale is Ralph Ekstrand, the Deputy Mayor is William Barrett, and the Village Trustees are Cheryl Parisi, Walter Priestley, and Craig Rosasco.

=== Representation in higher government ===
==== County representation ====
The Village of Farmingdale is located entirely within Nassau County's 17th Legislative district, which as of July 2025 is represented in the Nassau County Legislature by Rose Marie Walker (D–Hicksville).

==== State representation ====
===== New York State Assembly =====
Farmingdale is located within New York's 15th State Assembly district, which as of July 2025 is represented by Jacob Ryan Blumencranz (R–Oyster Bay).

===== New York State Senate =====
Farmingdale is located entirely within New York's 5th State Senate district, which as of July 2025 is represented by Steven Rhoads (R–Bellmore).

==== Federal representation ====
===== United States Congress =====
Farmingdale is located entirely within New York's 3rd Congressional district, which as of July 2025 is represented in the United States Congress by Thomas R. Suozzi (D–Glen Cove).

===== United States Senate =====
As with the rest of New York, Farmingdale is represented in the United States Senate by Kirsten E. Gillibrand (D) and Charles E. Schumer (D).

=== Politics ===
In the 2024 U.S. presidential election, the majority of Farmingdale voters voted for Donald J. Trump (R).

== Education ==
=== Schools ===
Farmingdale is served by the Farmingdale Union Free School District. The district includes Farmingdale High School, Howitt Middle School, Northside Elementary School, Woodward Parkway School, Albany Avenue Elementary School, and Saltzman East Memorial.

Furthermore, the Northside Elementary School and Howitt Middle School are both located within the village.

=== Library district ===
Farmingdale is located within the boundaries of the Farmingdale Library District, which is served by the Farmingdale Public Library.

== Infrastructure ==
=== Transportation ===
==== Road ====
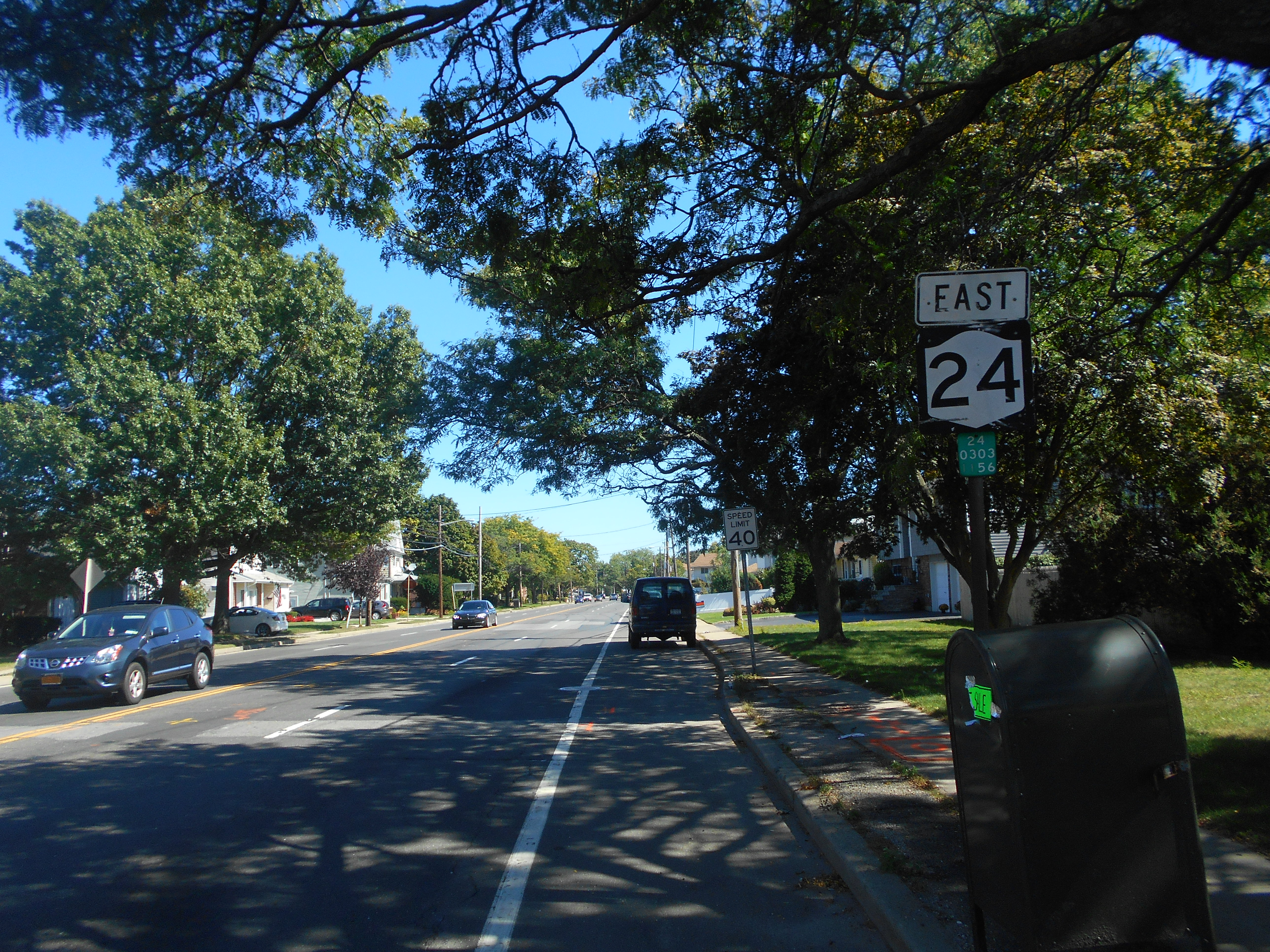
Conklin Street (NY 24) at its intersection in the village with Secatogue Avenue in 2014

Two state roads are pass through (and thus directly serve) the Village of Farmingdale:

- Conklin Street (NY 24) – Runs through the heart of Farmingdale and its downtown, from west-to-east.
- Fulton Street (NY 109) – Runs along northwest-to-southeast through the southern portion of the village; roughly parallels the Long Island Rail Road's Central Branch.

Other major roads within the village include Bethpage Road, Clinton Street, Front Street, Main Street, Melville Road, Merritts Road, Secatogue Avenue, Staples Road, and Thomas Powell Boulevard.

==== Rail ====
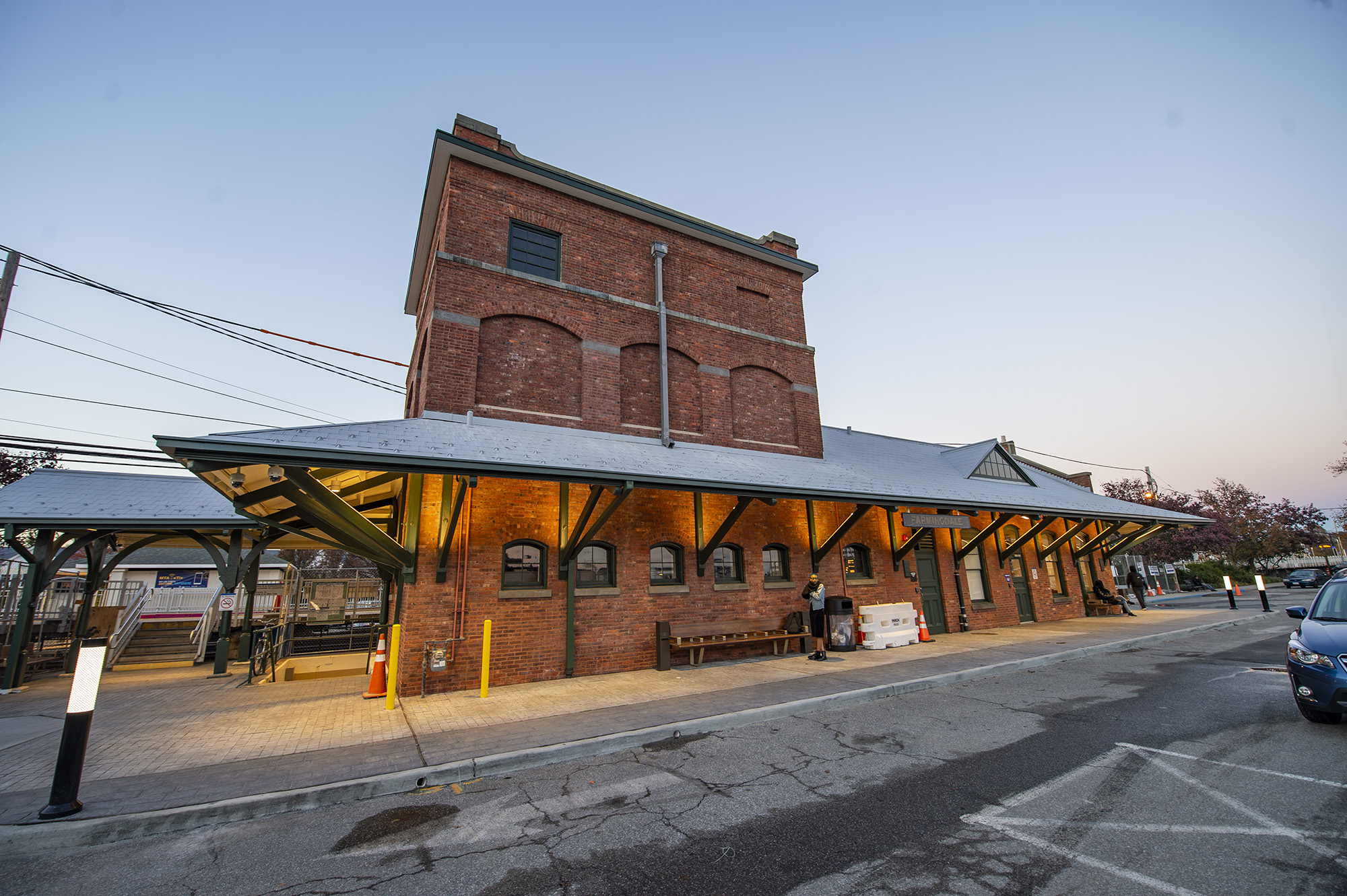
The Farmingdale LIRR station in 2018

The Long Island Rail Road's Farmingdale station – a major station on the LIRR's Main Line, serving Ronkonkoma Branch trains – is located within the village's downtown area. Additionally, the LIRR's Central Branch forms much of the village's southern border – although it makes no stops within Farmingdale.

The village is also the site of a transit-oriented development centered around the LIRR station.

==== Bus ====
The Village of Farmingdale is served by two Nassau Inter-County Express (NICE) routes: the n70 and n71.

==== Greenway ====
A new greenway – to be known as the Long Island Greenway – is planned to be constructed from Farmingdale to Montauk.

=== Utilities ===
==== Natural gas ====
National Grid USA provides natural gas to homes and businesses that are hooked up to natural gas lines in Farmingdale.

==== Power ====
PSEG Long Island provides power to all homes and businesses within Farmingdale, on behalf of the Long Island Power Authority.

==== Sewage ====
Farmingdale is located within the Nassau County Sewage District and is connected to its sanitary sewer network.

==== Water ====
The Village of Farmingdale operates its own municipal water supply system, which provides the entirety of the village with water.

=== Emergency services ===
==== Fire ====
The Village of Farmingdale features its own fire department, which provides the entire village with fire protection.

==== Police ====
Farmingdale is served by the Nassau County Police Department's 8th Precinct.

== Notable people ==
- Barbara Stern Burstin, Holocaust scholar
- Gregory W. Carman, (1937–2020) US Congressman
- Ryan Cruthers, professional hockey player
- Canute Curtis, former American college (West Virginia) and professional football (Cincinnati Bengals) player
- Matt Danowski, professional lacrosse player
- Dan Domenech, theater actor
- William Gaddis, U.S. novelist
- Peter J. Ganci Jr. (1946–2001), Chief of Department of the New York City Fire Department; murdered in the September 11 terrorist attacks
- George Hincapie, professional bicycle racer
- Howard T. Hogan, New York State Supreme Court Justice
- Ze'ev Jabotinsky, leader of "Revisionist" Zionism; was buried in the New Montefiore Cemetery until reburial in Jerusalem in 1964
- Tom Kennedy, professional football player for the Detroit Lions
- Ed Kranepool, baseball player, lived in South Farmingdale for many years
- April Lawton, musician and artist, member of Ramatam
- Macseal, indie rock band
- SallyAnn Salsano, producer of MTV reality shows, including Jersey Shore, through her company 495 Productions (named for the interstate passing by the community)
- William T. Schwendler (1904–1978), executive vice president and chairman of the board, Grumman Corporation
- George F. Titterton (1904–1998), senior vice president, Grumman Corporation
- Al Weis, baseball player

== See also ==
- List of municipalities in New York
- South Farmingdale, New York
- East Farmingdale, New York
