= American Pastime =

Studio album by Three Dog Night
- Released: March 1976
- Genres: Disco; soft rock
- Length: 34:42
- Label: ABC
- Producer: Bob Monaco

Three Dog Night chronology
Coming Down Your Way (1975)	American Pastime (1976)	The Best of 3 Dog Night (1982)

Singles from American Pastime
- 1. "Everybody's a Masterpiece" Released: May 1976

Professional ratings
Review scores
Source	Rating
AllMusic	(not rated)

American Pastime is the tenth studio album by American rock band Three Dog Night, released in 1976.

== Background ==
It is the band's most recent studio album (as of 2026) and the only one not to feature the founding vocalists (Chuck Negron, Cory Wells, and Danny Hutton) backed up by their long-time band, with some exceptions. It sold poorly and the band broke up in August 1976. Michael Allsup and Floyd Sneed had left the band in late 1974 to form their own group SS Fools, with former Three Dog Night member Joe Schermie, Stan Seymore, Wayne DeVillier, Bobby Kimball, and Jon Smith, to little success. Danny Hutton was fired from TDN in late 1975, and was not present for any of the recording. "Mellow Down", the song Hutton sings lead on, was recorded long before the album was released, and is likely an extra track from a previous album, such as Coming Down Your Way (1975) or Hard Labor (1974). He was replaced by Jay Gruska.

== Track listing ==
1. "Everybody's a Masterpiece" (George Clinton, Richard Ira Reicheg) – 2:45
2. "Easy Evil" (Alan O'Day) – 3:38
3. "Billy The Kid" (Billy Lawrie, Marie Lawrie) – 3:41
4. "Mellow Down" (Andy Fairweather-Low) – 3:00
5. "Yellow Beach Umbrella" (Craig Doerge, Judy Henske) – 4:56
6. "Hang On" (Jay Gruska, Jeffrey Spirit) – 4:18
7. "Southbound" (Hoyt Axton, Mark M. Dawson) – 4:11
8. "Drive On, Ride On" (Dobie Gray, Troy Harold Seals) – 3:32
9. "Dance The Night Away" (Bob Carpenter, David James Holster) – 4:41

== Personnel ==
- Danny Hutton – vocals on one track, not present during recording
- Chuck Negron – vocals
- Cory Wells – vocals
- Jay Gruska – vocals
- Gavin Christopher – conga
- Al Ciner – lead guitar
- Dan Ferguson – electric guitar
- Ed Greene – drums
- Jimmy Greenspoon – keyboard
- Skip Konte – keyboard, clavinet
- Mickey McMeel – drums
- Dennis Belfield – bass
- Jeff Porcaro – drums
- Ron Stockert – keyboards, synthesizer bass

== Production ==
- Producer: Bob Monaco
- Engineer: Tony Sciarrotta, Scott Spain
- Arranger: Three Dog Night

== Critical reception ==
A Cash Box Magazine album review dated April 10, 1976, states "American Pastime takes Three Dog Night in a new direction featuring a collection of tunes ranging from slick production cuts to the ever popular disco beat. Vocals are as clean and distinctive as ever, leaning toward a meticulous pop production. AM programmers will find "Billy the Kid" and "Southbound" prime pop cuts, while "Drive On, Ride On" and "Everybody's A Masterpiece" should appeal to the growing disco market. Some cuts (witness "Easy Evil") will work nicely in easy listening and MOR areas."

Another Record World "Album Picks" review page dated April 17, 1976 gives another view on the album: "This one may come as a surprise to the group's older fans. The mix still focuses on vocal harmonies but the songs are R&B and disco for the most part. "Hang On", "Mellow Down" and "Everybody Is A Masterpiece" are pacesetters, the rhythm section rising in importance as the American pastime continues to dance."

Another Cash Box Magazine "Picks of The Week" singles reviews page dated June 5, 1976 states the following about "Everybody's a Masterpiece", the single released off the album: "A laid-back rock hymn to humanity, this is an intelligent single from Three Dog Night that will serve to broaden its already extensive audience. The instrumentation — particularly the organ fills — is lush, and the vocals are equal to the task. Look for this to show up strong on all pop radio outlets; it's really an affecting tune."

Another Record World "Single Picks" review page dated June 5, 1976, gives another view on the single: "Three Dog Night's vocal prowess remains unquestioned with this, their first effort in some time. To back up its talent, the group has constructed a solid rhythmic pulse and is headed for pop/R&B play."

== Charts ==
Album – Billboard (United States) | RPM (Canada)

Year	Chart	Position
1976	US Billboard Top LPs	123
1976	US Cash Box	155
1976	US Record World	181

Singles

Year	Single	Chart	Position
1976	"Everybody's a Masterpiece"	US Easy Listening	44
