= 1000 Hands: Chapter One =

Fifteenth studio album by Jon Anderson

Studio album by Jon Anderson
- Released: 31 March 2019 31 July 2020 (re-release)
- Recorded: Solar Studios, Orlando, Florida
- Genre: Art-rock, pop
- Length: 52:15
- Label: Blue Élan Records (2020 re-release)
- Producer: Michael Franklin

Jon Anderson chronology
Invention of Knowledge (2016)	1000 Hands: Chapter One (2019)	True (2024)

1000 Hands: Chapter One is the fifteenth studio album by English singer-songwriter and musician Jon Anderson, originally released in March 2019.

== Origins ==
The album originates from sessions for a project to have been called Uzlot (a northern English pronunciation of "us lot") that Anderson had been recording in Big Bear, California, with Brian Chatton around 1990. Chatton wrote most of the music, played keyboards and also sang. Anderson asked his then Yes bandmates Chris Squire and Alan White to play on the project too. At the time, Yes were preparing for a tour and Anderson put the master tapes in his garage and, as he has recounted, gave them very little thought for many years. In 2016, producer Michael Franklin contacted Anderson about using the tapes and finishing the album. Further recordings followed at Solar Studios in Orlando, Florida. Along with some newly written material, the final result is 1000 Hands.

As the album title suggests, the album was created with a number of guest performers, including Chatton, Steve Howe, Jethro Tull's Ian Anderson, Larry Coryell, Steve Morse, Journey keyboardist Jonathan Cain, Vanilla Fudge drummer Carmine Appice, Rick Derringer, the Tower of Power horn section, violinist Jean-Luc Ponty and pianist Chick Corea.

== Release ==
In October 2018, a dedicated album website launched containing the artwork and audio samples. The album was released on 31 March 2019 under multiple formats: digital download, CD, and limited edition vinyl. Anderson also released the following statement.

"I've spent long periods of time making some records, but I've never taken a journey quite like this one. To say that 1,000 Hands has been a long time in coming would be quite an understatement, but I'm thrilled that it's finally a reality and that my fans will now be able to hear it. And I think they'll be delighted to hear music that's timeless. It's one of the best things I've ever done".

=== Re-release ===
On 29 May 2020, Jon Anderson revealed that the 1000 Hands album would be released again in summer 2020. Indeed, Anderson signed a new deal with Blue Élan Records. The album would be launched on 31 July 2020 on CD, deluxe 180-gram double vinyl and on digital and streaming platforms.

== Promotion ==
Anderson promoted the album with a US tour from March to August 2019.

== Track listing ==
No.	Title	Writer(s)	Length
1.	"Now"	Jon Anderson, Brian Chatton	1:15
2.	"Ramalama"	Anderson, Michael T. Franklin	3:52
3.	"First Born Leaders"	Anderson, Chatton	5:21
4.	"Activate"	Anderson, Chatton	8:52
5.	"Makes Me Happy"	Anderson	3:54
6.	"Now Variations"	Anderson, Chatton	1:10
7.	"I Found Myself"	Anderson	5:08
8.	"Twice in a Lifetime"	Anderson, Chatton	5:27
9.	"WDMCF"	Anderson, Franklin	3:42
10.	"1000 Hands (Come Up)"	Anderson, Chatton	9:24
11.	"Now and Again"	Anderson, Chatton	3:38
Total length:			52:15

"WDMCF" stands for "Where Does Music Come From".

== Personnel ==
Music

- Jon Anderson – various instruments, vocals

Additional musicians

- Steve Howe – guitar
- Larry Coryell – guitar
- Rick Derringer – guitar
- Chris Squire – bass guitar
- Tim Franklin – bass guitar, ukulele, backing vocals
- Stuart Hamm – bass guitar
- Brian Chatton – keyboards, backing vocals
- Chick Corea – keyboards
- Jonathan Cain – keyboards
- Michael Franklin – keyboards, ukulele, backing vocals
- Alan White – drums
- Billy Cobham – drums
- Matt Brown – drums, backing vocals
- Jerry Goodman – violin
- Jean-Luc Ponty – violin
- Robby Steinhardt – violin
- Charlie Bisharat – violin
- Olga Kopakova – violin
- Dariusz Grabowski – accordion
- Brian Snapp – saxophone, flute
- Charlie DeChant – saxophone, flute
- Ian Anderson – flute
- Tower of Power – horn section
- Zap Mama – backing vocals
- Bobby Kimball – backing vocals
- Solar Choir – choir
- Voices of Lindahl – choir
- Crossover
- Vioelectric
- Orlando Symphony Orchestra – strings and horns

Production

- Michael Franklin – producer
- Matt Brown – mixing
- Bernie Grundman – mastering

== Charts ==
Chart (2020)	Peak position
Belgian Albums (Ultratop Wallonia)	169
German Albums (Offizielle Top 100)	74
Scottish Albums (OCC)	84
UK Independent Albums (OCC)	28
