= Coming Down Your Way =

Studio album by Three Dog Night
- Released: May 1, 1975
- Genre: Pop rock; soft rock
- Length: 45:40
- Label: ABC
- Producer: Jimmy Ienner

Three Dog Night chronology
Joy to the World: Their Greatest Hits (1974)	Coming Down Your Way (1975)	American Pastime (1976)

Singles from Coming Down Your Way
- 1. "Til the World Ends" Released: July 1975

Professional ratings
Review scores
Source	Rating
AllMusic	(no rating) link

Coming Down Your Way is the ninth studio album by American rock band Three Dog Night, released in 1975. The album's original working title was "Dog Style", which was changed for unknown reasons.

== Track listing ==
1. "'Til the World Ends" (Dave Loggins) – 3:32
2. "You Can Leave Your Hat On" (Randy Newman) – 3:06
3. "Good Old Feeling" (Kent Sprague, Gary Stovall) – 3:14
4. "Mind over Matter" (Allen Toussaint) – 3:05
5. "Midnight Flyer (Eli Wheeler)" (Frank "Skip" Konte) – 4:34
6. "Kite Man" (Bonnie Spirit, Jay Gruska) – 4:18
7. "Coming Down Your Way" (Jack Lynton) – 4:02
8. "When It's Over" (Jeff Barry) – 4:50
9. "Lean Back, Hold Steady" (Daniel Moore) – 3:48
10. "Yo Te Quiero Hablar (Take You Down)" (Gregory Grandillo) – 5:11

== Personnel ==
- Mike Allsup – guitar (Additional on track 9), Electric guitar (3–5, 8, 10), Acoustic Guitar (5, 10), All Guitars (1–2, 7)
- Dennis Belfield – bass (tracks 4, 6–9)
- Jimmy Greenspoon – piano (Additional on track 1, Acoustic on 5, Solo on 7), Electric Piano (5), ARP String Ensemble (1), clavinet (3), organ (3–4, 6), ARP synthesizer (6), All Pianos (2–4, 7, 9–10)
- Danny Hutton – lead vocals (tracks 4–6), background vocals (1, 3–10)
- Mickey McMeel – percussion (tracks 1–4, 6–7, 9–10), drums (3, 6)
- Chuck Negron – lead vocals (tracks 1, 7, 8 and 10), background vocals (1, 3–10)
- Jack Ryland – bass (tracks 1–3, 5, 10)
- Floyd Sneed – drums (tracks 1–5, 7–10)
- Ron Stockert – Fender Rhodes piano (track 1)
- Cory Wells – lead vocals (tracks 2, 3, 9), background vocals (1, 3–8, 10)

Additional personnel

- Ben Benay – rhythm guitar (track 3), electric guitar (4, 9), acoustic guitar (8, solo on 10), horn arrangements (7)
- Victor Feldman – marimba, vibraphone (track 10)
- Chuck Findley – trumpet (track 10), slide trumpet (2)
- Gary Giambroni – harp (track 10)
- Jay Gruska – background vocals (track 6)
- Jimmy Ienner – conga (track 10), background vocals (4)
- Skip Konte – Chamberlin (tracks 1, 6, 8), organ (1–3, 5, 7–9), clavinet (3, 6), ARP synthesizer (1, 8, 10), ARP string ensemble (5)
- William Perkins – baritone saxophone (track 4)
- George Pierre – conga (track 6)
- Dalton Smith – trumpet (track 10)
- Ernie Watts – saxophone solo (track 7)

== Production ==
- Producer: Jimmy Ienner
- Engineer: Carmine Rubino, Shelly Yakus
- Arranger: Jimmie Haskell (Mariachi Music on track 10), (Strings on 1, 5, 8), & (Horns on 7, 9)

== Reception ==
A Cash Box Magazine album review dated June 7, 1975 states "One of the major factors behind Three Dog Night's rise to the top of the pop heap has been their almost uncanny ability of giving new life and stature to other people's songs. This mastery of other people's material continues on Coming Down Your Way as the Dog's put their own brand of pop polish on the likes of Randy Newman's “You Can Leave Your Hat On" and Allen Toussaint's "Mind Over Matter”. Chuck Negron's gritty vocals on the disk's title track proves a musical as do the same on "Til The World Ends". Three Dog Night's Coming Down Their Way; there isn't a dog in this musical litter."

Another Cash Box Magazine "Picks of The Week" singles review page dated June 28, 1975 states the following about "Til the World Ends", the single released off the album: "With classically-inspired string arrangements by Jimmie Haskell leading off, the incomparable vocal stylings of a very new Three Dog changes musical directions and overall sound with a very straightforward love ballad. Lush orchestrations and production complexity make this an interesting prospect for the summer months."

A Billboard magazine Top Album Picks page dated June 7, 1975 gives another view: "Say what you will, there is no other group who can tackle as many diverse styles in one LP and do them as well as Three Dog. Working with producer Jimmy lenner (Grand Funk) and associate producer Bob Monaco (Rufus) the band takes on Randy Newman, Allen Toussaint, Dave Loggins, Jeff Barry and Daniel Moore among others and comes up with creditable renditions of the material of each. Songs are heavily keyboard based when uptempo songs are taken on and string oriented on the ballads, which tend to be more effective than the rockers. Somehow, the wilder material seems a bit strained and contrived while the slower tunes work both vocally and instrumentally. Strongest lead vocals come from Chuck Negron, who appears most at home with both ballads and rockers. Nothing overly original here, but the group has never claimed that skill. It is interpretations that they have always shone, and this is where they shine once more. Best cuts: "'Til The World Ends", "Good Old Feeling", "Coming Down Your Way", "When It's Over", "Yo Te Quiero Hablar (Take You Down)". One of America's few supergroups."

== Charts ==
Album – Billboard (United States) | RPM (Canada)

Year	Chart	Position
1975	Japan Oricon	78
1975	US Top 200	70
1975	US Record World	66
1975	US Cash Box Top 200	63
1975	US Cash Box Top 100	44
1975	Canada	27

Singles – Billboard (United States) | RPM (Canada)

Year	Single	Chart	Position
1975	"Til the World Ends"	US Pop Singles	32
1975	"Til the World Ends"	US Adult Contemporary	11
1975	"Til the World Ends"	US Cash Box	29
1975	"Til the World Ends"	US Record World	22
1975	"Til the World Ends"	US Radio & Records	26
1975	"Til the World Ends"	Canada RPM Adult Contemporary	9
1975	"Til the World Ends"	Canada Pop Singles	26
