= Samuel C. Phillips =

United States Air Force general (1921–1990)

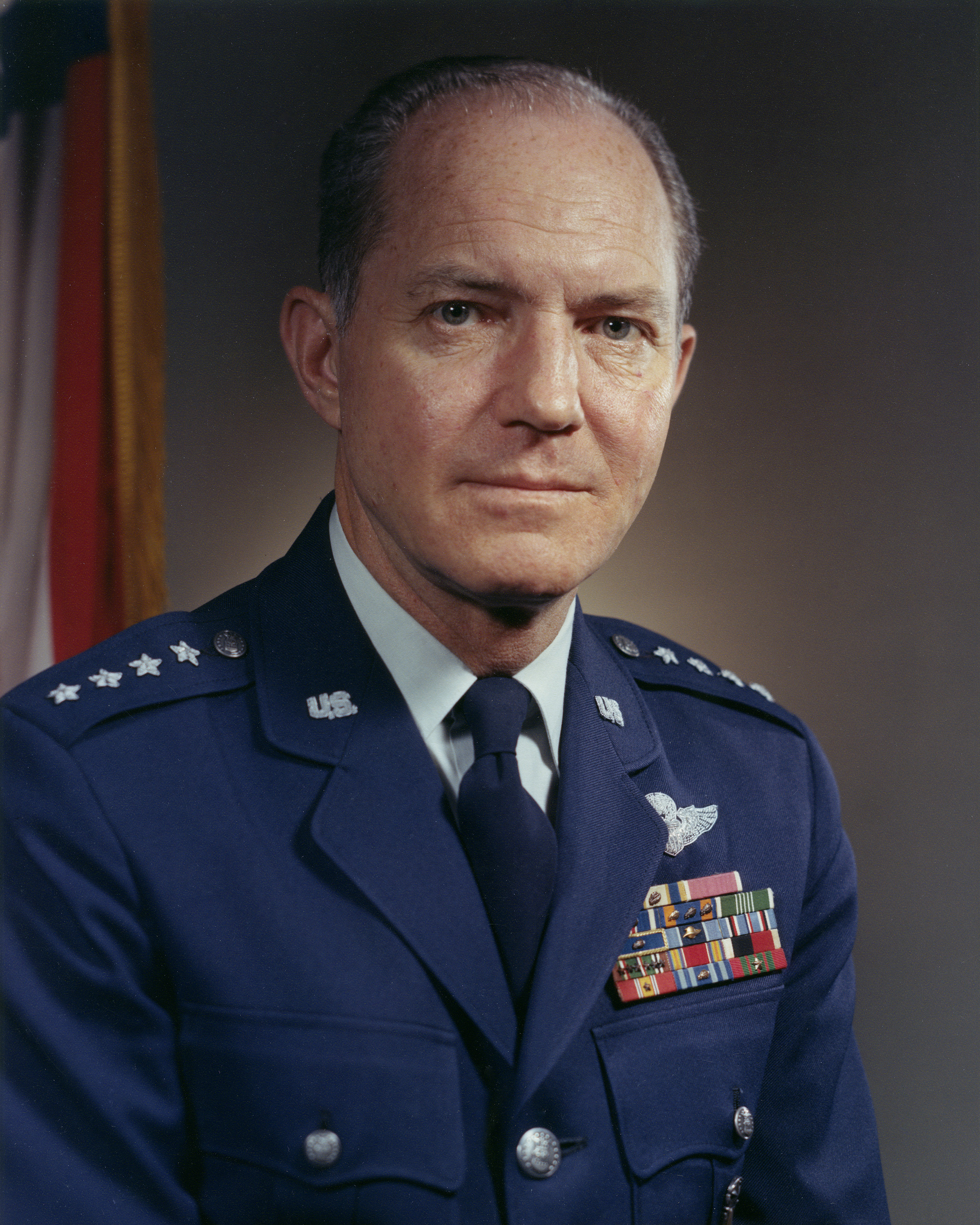
- Phillips c. 1970s
- Born: 19 February 1921; Springerville, Arizona, U.S.
- Died: 31 January 1990 (aged 68); Palos Verdes, California, U.S.
- Burial place: United States Air Force Academy Cemetery, Colorado Springs, Colorado, U.S.
- Alma mater: University of Wyoming (BS); University of Michigan (MS)
- Military career
- Allegiance: United States
- Branch: United States Army; United States Air Force
- Service years: 1942–1947 (Army); 1947–1975 (Air Force)
- Rank: General
- Nickname: Sam
- Service number: O-25413 (Army); 8981A (Air Force)
- Commands: National Security Agency; Air Force Systems Command
- Conflicts: World War II
- Awards: Air Force Distinguished Service Medal; NASA Distinguished Service Medal (2); Legion of Merit; Distinguished Flying Cross (2); Air Medal (8); Croix de guerre 1939–1945 (France)

Samuel Cochran Phillips (19 February 1921 – 31 January 1990) was a United States Air Force general who served as Director of NASA's Apollo program from 1964 to 1969, as commander of the Space and Missile Systems Organization (SAMSO) from 1969 to 1972, as the seventh Director of the National Security Agency from 1972 to 1973, and as commander of the Air Force Systems Command from 1973 to 1975.

A 1942 graduate of the University of Wyoming, Phillips was commissioned in the Army through the Reserve Officers Training Corps. He transferred to the Army Air Corps, qualified as a fighter pilot, and flew two tours of duty in World War II with the Eighth Air Force's 364th Fighter Group. After the war he was an electronics officer during Operation Greenhouse nuclear weapon tests at Eniwetok Atoll, and served in project officer assignments with the Boeing B-52 Stratofortress heavy bomber, AIM-4 Falcon air-to-air missile, and Bomarc surface-to-air missile programs. He helped negotiate the agreement with the United Kingdom for the deployment and use of the American Thor nuclear-armed intermediate-range ballistic missiles. In 1958, he was assigned to the Air Force Ballistic Missile Division of the Air Research and Development Command, as the Director of the Minuteman Intercontinental Ballistic Missile (ICBM) Program. As such, he oversaw the first deployments of Minuteman missiles in 1962.

In 1964, Phillips was seconded to NASA as the director of the Apollo program. He brought in Air Force personnel to fill project management positions, and instituted common procedures, documentation and terminology, to prevent potentially catastrophic failures and oversights. An Apollo Configuration Management Manual was issued in 1964, which was largely copied from the Air Force Systems Command's manual. Phillips proposed a system of design reviews and change control that would give managers both the authority and the information necessary to manage the project. Daily reports were sent to headquarters, where they were kept by a central control room he modeled on the one that he had used on the Minuteman project. The Apollo program's mission was accomplished in July 1969 with the Apollo 11 Moon landing, and Phillips returned to the Air Force.

== Early years and education ==
Phillips was born on 19 February 1921 in Springerville, Arizona, where his father was an electrician, and his mother was a schoolteacher. He was the oldest of six children; he had three brothers and two sisters. He attended public schools in Denver, Colorado, and Cheyenne, Wyoming, where he graduated from Cheyenne High School in 1938. He was interested in electricity and electrical equipment, and acquired an amateur radio license. There was a Civil Aeronautics Authority radio station at the airport, which was not far from Cheyenne High School, and Phillips learned about radio and aviation there. He secured a scholarship to the University of Wyoming, where he earned a Bachelor of Science degree in electrical engineering in 1942. He was a member of Kappa Sigma fraternity. During his summer break in 1941, he earned his private pilot license.

== Military service ==
On graduation from the University of Wyoming, where the Reserve Officers Training Corps (ROTC) was compulsory, Phillips was commissioned as a second lieutenant in the infantry. He sat a competitive examination for a regular commission, and was accepted. By the time he graduated, the United States had entered World War II. He then entered active military service, and in June 1942 went to Fort Benning, Georgia, where he received infantry officer training. He transferred to the Army Air Corps, attended flying school and earned his pilot wings. He married Betty Anne Brown, who was also from Cheyenne, at Fort Benning in August 1942. They had three daughters: Dana, Janie, and Kathleen.

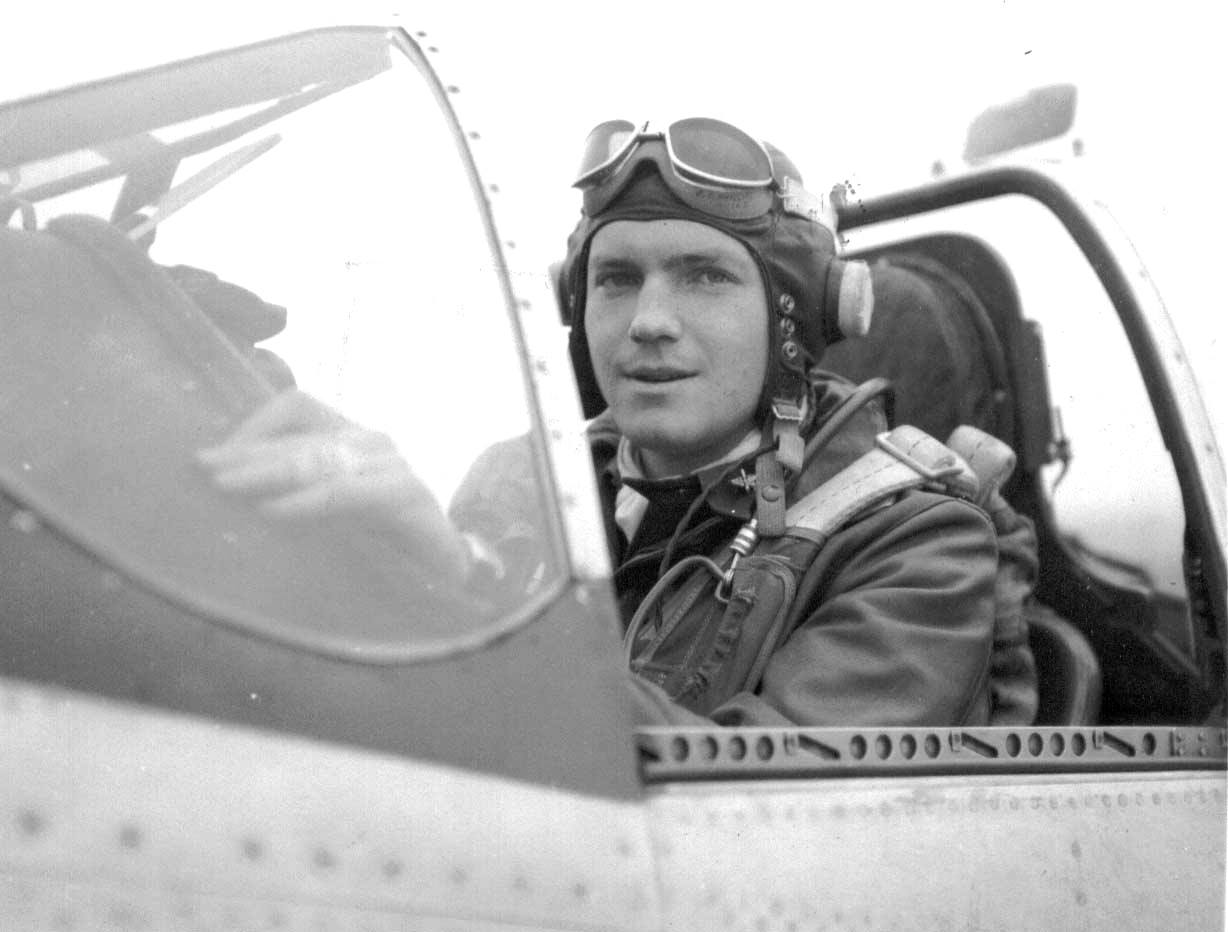
Sam Phillips at RAF Honington in his P-51 Mustang, named "Dana" after his daughter

Phillips was given basic flight training in PT-17 biplanes by civilian instructors at Rankin Field in Tulare, California, and then at Lemoore Army Airfield in Lemoore, California in PT-15 biplanes. This was followed by advanced training at Williams Army Airfield in Arizona in the P-322, a training version of the Lockheed P-38 Lightning. He was then assigned to the 364th Fighter Group, which was successively based at Glendale Airport, Van Nuys Airport, Ontario Army Airfield and Santa Maria Army Air Field in California, before moving to the UK, where it was based at RAF Honington as part of the Eighth Air Force. The 364th Fighter Group converted to the North American P-51 Mustang in the summer of 1944. The group's main role was escorting Boeing B-17 Flying Fortress bombers on long-range bombing missions. Phillips completed two combat tours of duty in the European Theater of Operations. He was awarded the Distinguished Flying Cross with an oak leaf cluster, Air Medal with seven oak leaf clusters, and the French Croix de Guerre.

After the war, Phillips was assigned to the European Theater headquarters in Frankfurt, West Germany, where he served on the G-1 staff, which was responsible for personnel, and was headed by Major General James M. Brevans. In July 1947, he was transferred to Langley Air Force Base, Virginia. Phillips's research and development assignments included six years with the Engineering Division at Wright-Patterson Air Force Base, Ohio; duty as an electronics officer with the nuclear weapons experiments at Eniwetok Atoll during Operation Greenhouse; and in project officer assignments with the Boeing B-52 Stratofortress heavy bomber, the AIM-4 Falcon air-to-air missile, and the Bomarc surface-to-air missile programs. He earned a Master of Science degree in electrical engineering from the University of Michigan in 1950.

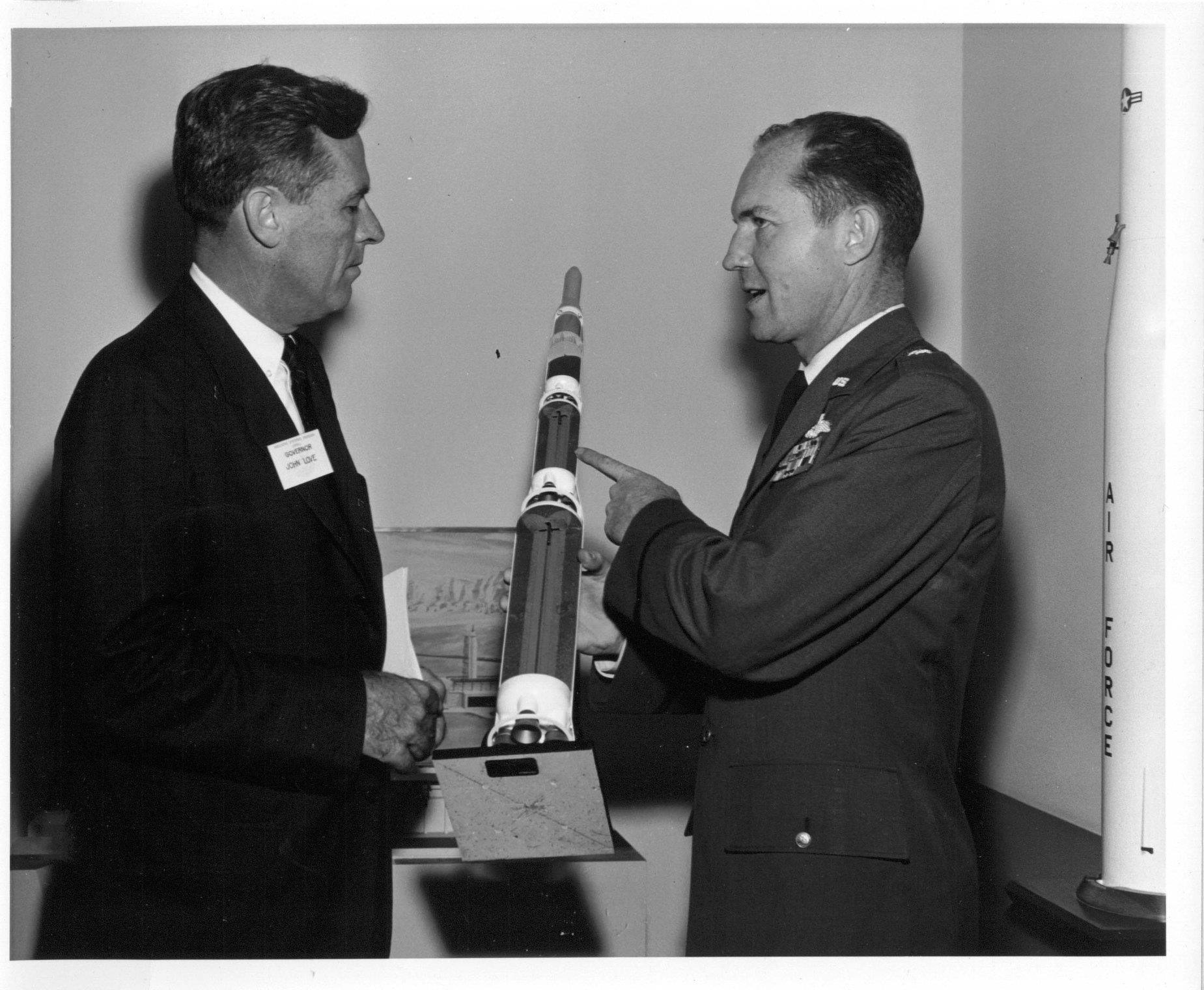
Phillips (right) briefs the governor of Colorado, John A. Love, on the Minuteman missile

Phillips returned to England in 1956, where he served with the 7th Air Division of the Strategic Air Command. He participated in the negotiation of the agreement with the United Kingdom for the deployment and use of the American Thor nuclear-armed intermediate-range ballistic missile (IRBM), which earned him the Legion of Merit. He returned to the United States in 1958, and was assigned to the Air Force Ballistic Missile Division of the Air Research and Development Command, in Los Angeles, California, as the Director of the Minuteman Intercontinental Ballistic Missile (ICBM) program. He was promoted to brigadier general in April 1961. This made him the youngest general officer in the US armed forces at the time.

In July 1960, Phillips froze the design of Minuteman, precluding further design changes, even though he knew that its range was 1,000 miles (1,600 km) short of its specified requirement. It was estimated that it would take between six months and a year of further development to achieve this. Given a choice between meeting the specification and meeting the schedule, he chose the latter. In 1962, the first Minuteman missiles were based at Malmstrom Air Force Base in Montana, from whence they could still reach their targets even with the reduced range. The increased range was achieved in time for the second Minuteman wing to be equipped with the longer-range version. He also decided, on his own authority, to install field maintenance points on the missile so maintenance could be performed in the field. This was contrary to the original design, but based on his experience with the B-52, Phillips believed that it was necessary.

== NASA service ==
In 1963, George E. Mueller, NASA's incoming Associate Administrator for Manned Space Flight, was confronted by projects with large cost overruns and scheduling slippages that threatened the Apollo program's goal of putting a man on the Moon by the end of the decade. Congress accepted that this would be very expensive, and was willing to pay the price to win the Space race, but took a dim view of repeated requests for additional funding simply because of NASA's poor forecasting. Mueller thought this was due to poor management skills; NASA had expanded rapidly, and its engineers had not worked on projects as large as Apollo. Mueller had worked for Ramo-Wooldridge on the Minuteman project, and he was aware of how Phillips had managed its schedule and costs, although they had not worked together. Mueller asked the head of the Air Force Systems Command (AFSC), General Bernard Schriever, if Phillips could be seconded to NASA as the program controller in the Office of Manned Space Flight (OMSF). Although Schriever was reluctant to part with one of his top ICBM project managers, he considered that the Air Force's Dyna-Soar and Manned Orbiting Laboratory programs could benefit from NASA experience. He agreed to Phillips's secondment to NASA, but only on the condition that Phillips was hired as the director of the Apollo program rather than as a mere underling. In December 1963, this was accomplished, and Phillips was assigned to NASA.

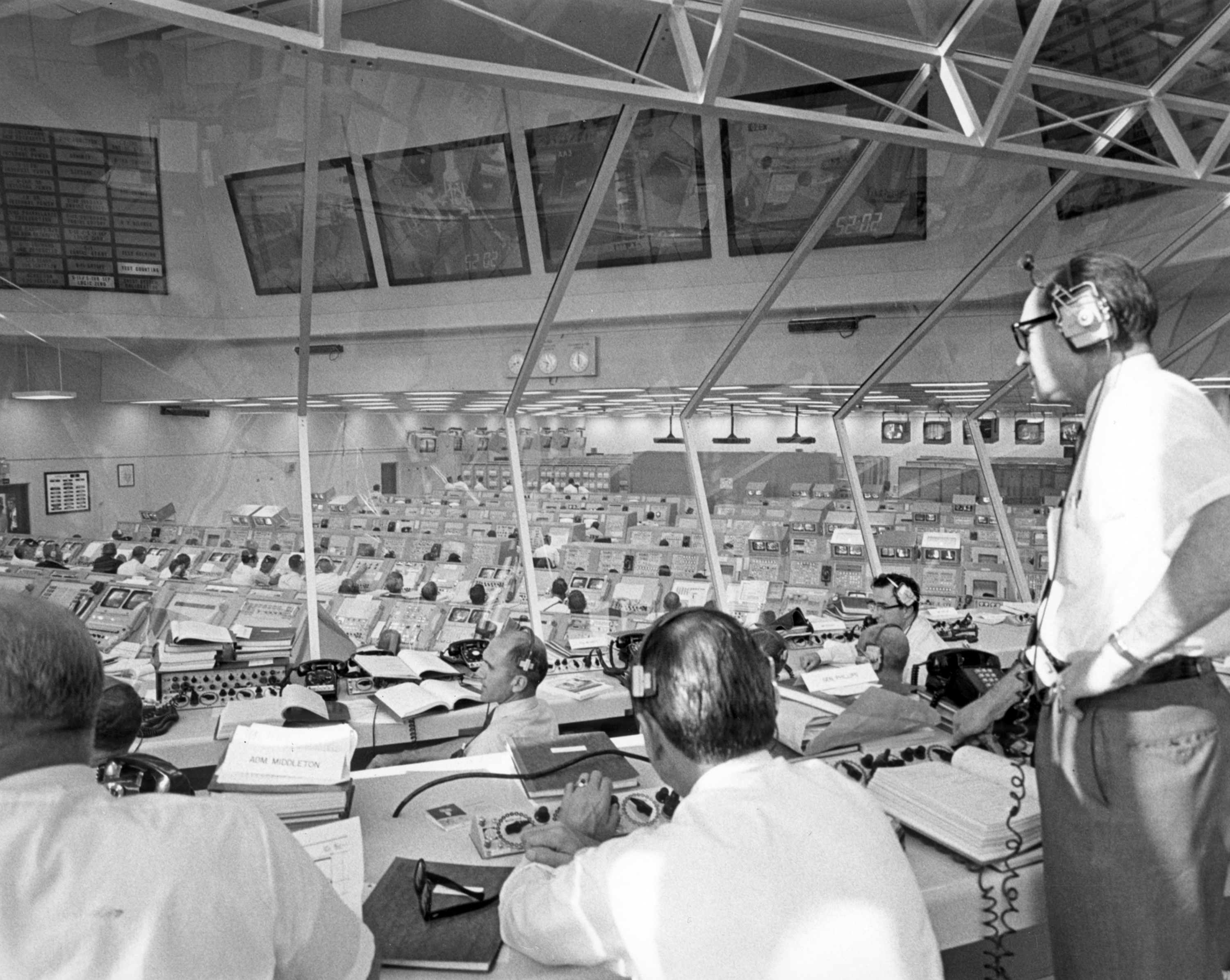
Phillips (right) monitors the liftoff of the Apollo 11 mission

The following month, Phillips wrote to Schriever requesting that Air Force personnel be provided to fill program control positions in the OMSF. The AFSC sent two officers. Phillips then asked for 55 more. Such a large request prompted negotiations between NASA and the Air Force. The United States Secretary of the Air Force, Eugene M. Zuckert, agreed to consider the request, subject to NASA providing position statements so that he could ensure that the work would benefit their careers. The Air Force agreed that it would provide officers for tours of duty lasting at least three years. Phillips ultimately requested and received the assignment of 128 more officers, most of whom were based at the Manned Spacecraft Center (MSC) in Houston, Texas. The officers assigned included Brigadier General David M. Jones, who became his deputy; Colonel Edmund F. O'Connor, as director of MSFC Industrial Operations; Colonel Samuel Yarchin, who became the deputy director of the Saturn V Project Office; and Colonel Carroll H. Bolender, who became the Apollo mission director. Phillips was promoted to the rank of major general in February 1964.

Phillips aggressively took on the job with constant daily meetings, phone contact, and visits to contractor sites which kept him on the road 75 per cent of the time. He described the job to New York Times reporter John Noble Wilford this way:

I'm at the level which knows all the things you have to know to make a major decision. Below the program director, there isn't anyone who has the whole picture. Above the program director, the men have so many other responsibilities.

Through the institution of common procedures, documentation and terminology, Phillips hoped to prevent potentially catastrophic failures and oversights, and to head off criticism from the media, Congress and the Government Accountability Office. An important step was the issuance of the Apollo Configuration Management Manual in 1964, which was largely copied from the AFSC's manual. Phillips proposed a system of design reviews and change control that would give managers both the authority and the information necessary to manage the project. Daily reports were sent to headquarters, where they were kept by a central control room he modeled on the one that he had used on the Minuteman project.

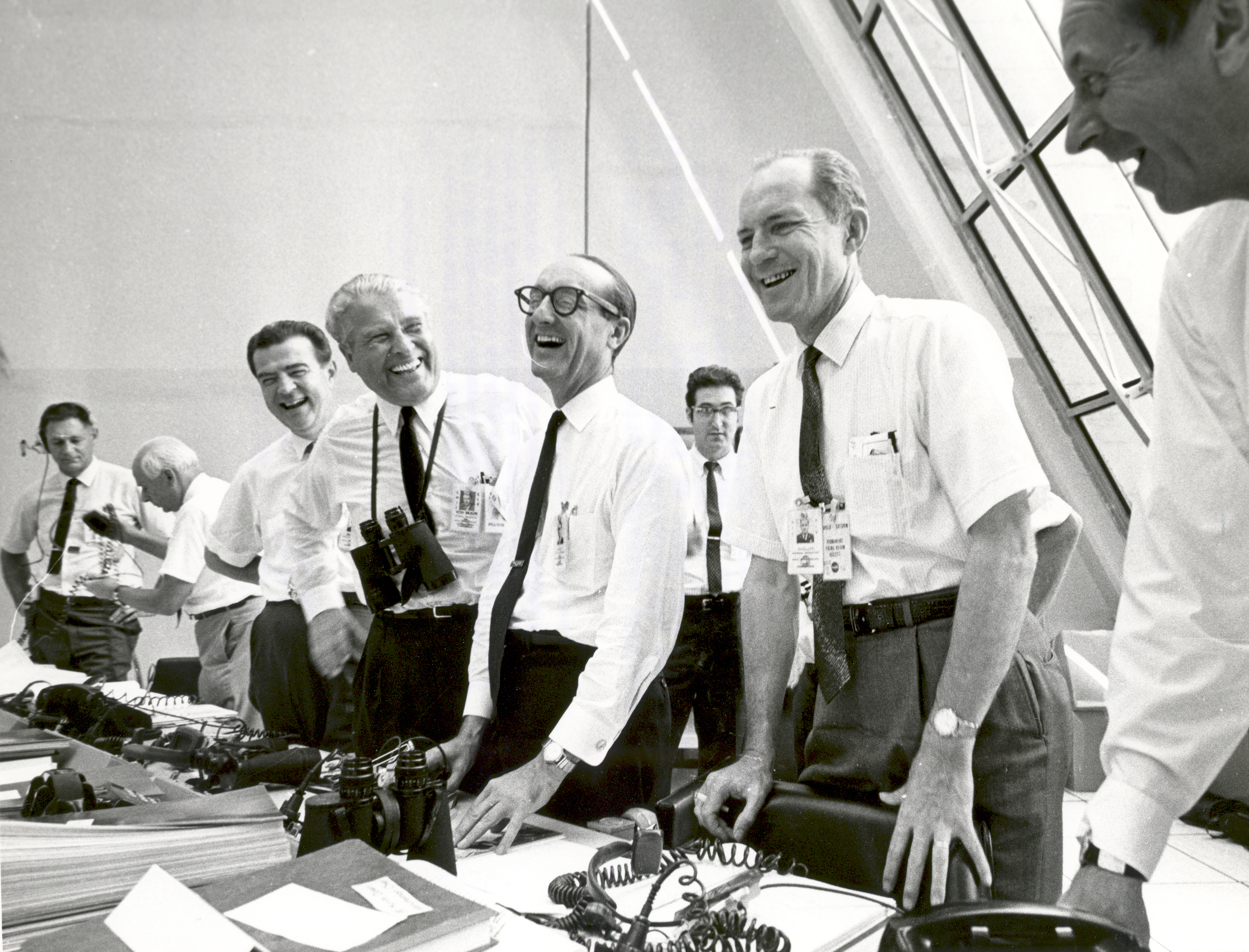
Charles Mathews, Wernher von Braun, George Mueller, and Samuel C. Phillips after the Apollo 11 liftoff

In November 1965, Phillips personally took a tiger team to North American Aviation (NAA) in Downey, California, the prime contractor for the Apollo Command/Service Module (CSM) and the Saturn V's S-II second stage, to investigate problems of delays, quality shortfalls and cost overruns. On 19 December, he wrote a memo to NAA president Lee Atwood with a copy of a report of his findings and some recommended fixes, which he also sent to Mueller. Mueller also sent Atwood a follow-on letter strongly expressing his disappointment with the CSM and S-II problems, requiring a response by the end of January 1966 and a follow-on visit of Phillips's team in March. Phillips privately wrote to Mueller recommending that the president of NAA's Space and Information Systems Division, Harrison Storms, be replaced. Atwood brought Robert Greer, a retired Air Force major general, in to manage the S-II project at NAA.

Phillips was also concerned about cost and schedule overruns at Grumman, which was building the Apollo Lunar Module (LM), and he sent a management review team headed by Wesley L. Hjornevik to Grumman headquarters in Bethpage, New York. The review team found fault with Grumman's management and procedures. Grumman adopted a system of "work packages", under which the project was broken down into discrete tasks, each with its own personnel, budget and manager, but this did not resolve all of its problems. In February 1967, Thomas J. Kelly was replaced as project manager by Grumman vice president George F. Titterton, who was sent back from the executive suites to the factory building to manage the project.

When the Apollo 1 fire killed three astronauts in a ground test on 27 January 1967, just before what was to have been the first manned Apollo mission, a Congressional investigation uncovered the existence of what came to be known as "the Phillips Report". NASA Administrator James E. Webb was called before Congress and when questioned by Senator Walter Mondale, he testified that he was unaware of the existence of the report. He only found out about it from Phillips and Mueller after the hearing. However, Congress found no fault with Phillips's management system. Webb now insisted that NAA remove Storms, and he was replaced by William D. Bergen.

The fire led Phillips to institute stricter measures to ensure quality and safety. Safety offices were established at every NASA field center in September 1967, and the following month the MSC created the Spacecraft Incident Investigation and Reporting Panel. The design of the first CSM and LM was frozen in October 1967, except for essential changes, which had to be approved by the MSC senior management board. Software changes were also restricted in February 1968. By this time, Phillips felt that restrictions had gone too far, and in October managers were permitted to approve minor changes, although any affecting schedules still had to be approved by the senior management board.

With the Apollo project moving again, but seriously behind schedule, Phillips prevailed upon Webb to authorize sending Apollo 8 on a mission to orbit the Moon. At a small dinner party before the launch of Apollo 10 in May 1969, Wernher von Braun, the director of the Marshall Space Flight Center in Huntsville, Alabama, praised Phillips as the one most responsible for pulling the many pieces of the Apollo program together and making them work on time.

During the Apollo 11 mission in July 1969 which achieved the program's manned landing goal, Phillips announced his intention to leave NASA and return to Air Force duty. During his NASA service, he was promoted to lieutenant general.

== Return to Air Force duties ==
In September 1969, Phillips assumed command of the Space and Missile Systems Organization (SAMSO), of the Air Force Systems Command in Los Angeles. In August 1972, he was appointed the seventh Director of the National Security Agency (DIRNSA) and the Chief of the Central Security Service. After two years in those positions, he was assigned as the commander of the Air Force Systems Command at Andrews Air Force Base, Maryland, in August 1973. He retired from the Air Force in 1975 as a general.

In the wake of the 1986 Space Shuttle Challenger disaster, NASA Administrator James C. Fletcher asked Phillips to lead a team to report on NASA's management. Phillips found that it had decayed since the days of Project Apollo, with the centers asserting their independence. He recommended strengthening NASA headquarters' control, and placing both the Space Shuttle and Space Station Freedom under a single manager.

== Death ==
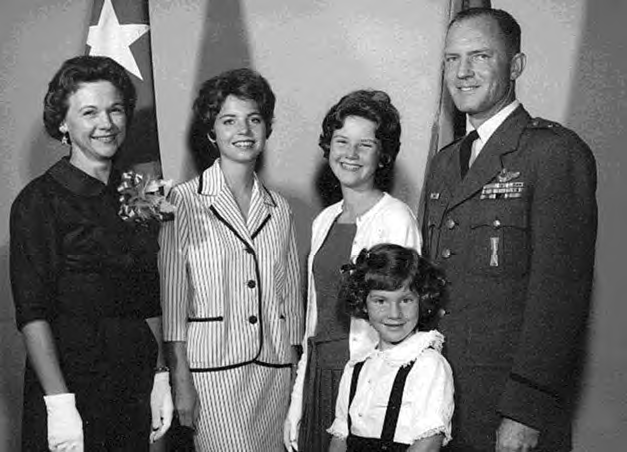
Phillips and his family at his promotion to brigadier general. Left to right: wife Betty Anne (known as B.A.), and daughters Dana, Janie, and Kathleen

Phillips died of cancer in Palos Verdes, California, on 31 January 1990. He was buried in the United States Air Force Academy Cemetery in Colorado Springs, Colorado, with military honors. His papers are in the Library of Congress.

== Awards and honors ==
Phillips was a Fellow of the Institute of Electrical and Electronics Engineers, and a member of the American Institute of Aeronautics and Astronautics. He was selected for a fellowship by that organization in October 1969 for "notable and valuable contributions to sciences and technology." In addition, Phillips was a fellow of the American Astronautical Society; an honorary member of the national business fraternity, Alpha Kappa Psi; a member of the Board of Governors of the "National Space Club"; a member of the board of directors of the United Services Automobile Association, and the president of the Military Benefit Association.

Phillips was awarded the Air Force Distinguished Service Medal in September 1969 for his service with NASA, and again in July 1972 for his service as the Commander of SAMSO. He also was awarded two NASA Distinguished Service Medals by that agency, in 1968 and 1969, for his leadership of the Apollo program, and he was given an honorary LL.D. degree from the University of Wyoming in June 1963.

On 26 September 1971, Phillips was awarded the Smithsonian Institution's Langley Gold Medal in aviation and space exploration for his contributions to the Apollo Program from 1964 to 1969. He was the 14th recipient of the Langley Medal since the award was first presented to the Wright Brothers in 1909. In April 1971, he was elected a member of the National Academy of Engineering for his leadership and his direction of the Minuteman missile Program and of the Apollo Program. Phillips received the General Thomas D. White U.S. Air Force Space Trophy on 11 September 1972 and the Flying Tiger Pilot Trophy (awarded by the American Volunteer Group) on 7 July 1973.

== Effective dates of promotion ==
Insignia	Rank	Date
	General	1 August 1973
	Lieutenant general	29 May 1968
	Major general	1 May 1964
	Brigadier general	1 September 1961
	Colonel	15 June 1954
	Lieutenant colonel	20 February 1951
	Major	9 March 1945
	Captain	26 June 1944
	First lieutenant	17 January 1944
	Second lieutenant	25 March 1942

== Notes ==
Government offices
Preceded by None	Apollo Program Director; 1964–1969	Succeeded by Rocco Petrone
Preceded by Noel Gayler	Director of the National Security Agency; 1972–1973	Succeeded by Lew Allen
