= Everybody's a Masterpiece =

Single by Three Dog Night

from the album American Pastime
- B-side: "Drive On, Ride On"
- Released: May 1976
- Genre: Disco, Adult Contemporary, Soft Rock
- Length: 2:45
- Label: ABC
- Songwriters: Richard Reicheg, George Clinton
- Producer: Bob Monaco

Three Dog Night singles chronology
| "Til the World Ends" (1975) | "Everybody's a Masterpiece" (1976) | "It's a Jungle Out There" (1983) |

"Everybody's a Masterpiece" is a song written by Richard Ira Reicheg and George S. Clinton, performed by Three Dog Night. The song was produced by Bob Monaco and arranged by Three Dog Night. It is featured on their 1976 album, American Pastime. This is Three Dog Night's last charting single, and the last single released before breaking up in August 1976.

== Critical reception ==
A Cash Box Magazine "Picks of The Week" singles reviews page dated June 5, 1976 states the following about the single: "A laid-back rock hymn to humanity, this is an intelligent single from Three Dog Night that will serve to broaden its already extensive audience. The instrumentation — particularly the organ fills — is lush, and the vocals are equal to the task. Look for this to show up strong on all pop radio outlets; it's really an affecting tune."

A Record World "Single Picks" review page dated June 5, 1976 gives another view: "Three Dog Night's vocal prowess remains unquestioned with this, their first effort in some time. To back up its talent, the group has constructed a solid rhythmic pulse and is headed for pop/r&b play."

== Charts ==
| Chart (1976) | Peak position |
|---|---|
| US Easy Listening (Billboard) | 44 |
