= Ramatam =

American rock band active in the 1970s

Ramatam was a 1970s rock band featuring Mike Pinera on guitar and vocals, April Lawton on lead guitar, and Mitch Mitchell on drums.

Ramatam was notable for having Lawton, a female lead guitarist. Tom Dowd produced their self-titled debut album in 1972. Pinera was known for his work with Blues Image ("Ride Captain Ride") and Iron Butterfly. Mitchell had been a member of The Jimi Hendrix Experience. The group also included some former members of Janis Joplin's Big Brother and The Holding Company. Joining Pinera, Mitchell and Lawton on the debut album were Russ Smith as bass player, contributor of one song and co-writer on two other collective tunes on the album, and multi-instrumentalist Tommy Sullivan, who co-wrote three songs with Lawton in addition to the two that all five members of this version of the band are credited on. Sullivan had been arranger and musical director of The Brooklyn Bridge, where Lawton is rumored to have been a guitarist.

Ramatam performed at Concert 10 in Long Pond, Pennsylvania with Emerson Lake & Palmer, Edgar Winter, Three Dog Night, The Faces and others in 1972.

Mitchell and Pinera's departures came before the band recorded its second and final album, In April Came the Dawning of the Red Suns (1973). Pinera left the band claiming that Lawton, who wanted both Pinera and Mitchell out, wanted to turn Ramatam into the "April Lawton Band." After Mitchell, Pinera and Smith departed from the band, the focus turned toward Lawton. Jimmy Walker replaced Mitchell on drums and the trio of Lawton, Sullivan and Walker recorded the second album. Lawton and Sullivan had (as a team) co-written about half the songs on the first album and they co-wrote all the music on the second one.

The band fractured under the pressures of business and musical direction and broke up in 1974.

== Discography ==
- Ramatam (Atlantic Records, 1972) U.S. #182
- In April Came the Dawning of the Red Suns (Atlantic, 1973)
