= Blues Image =

American rock band

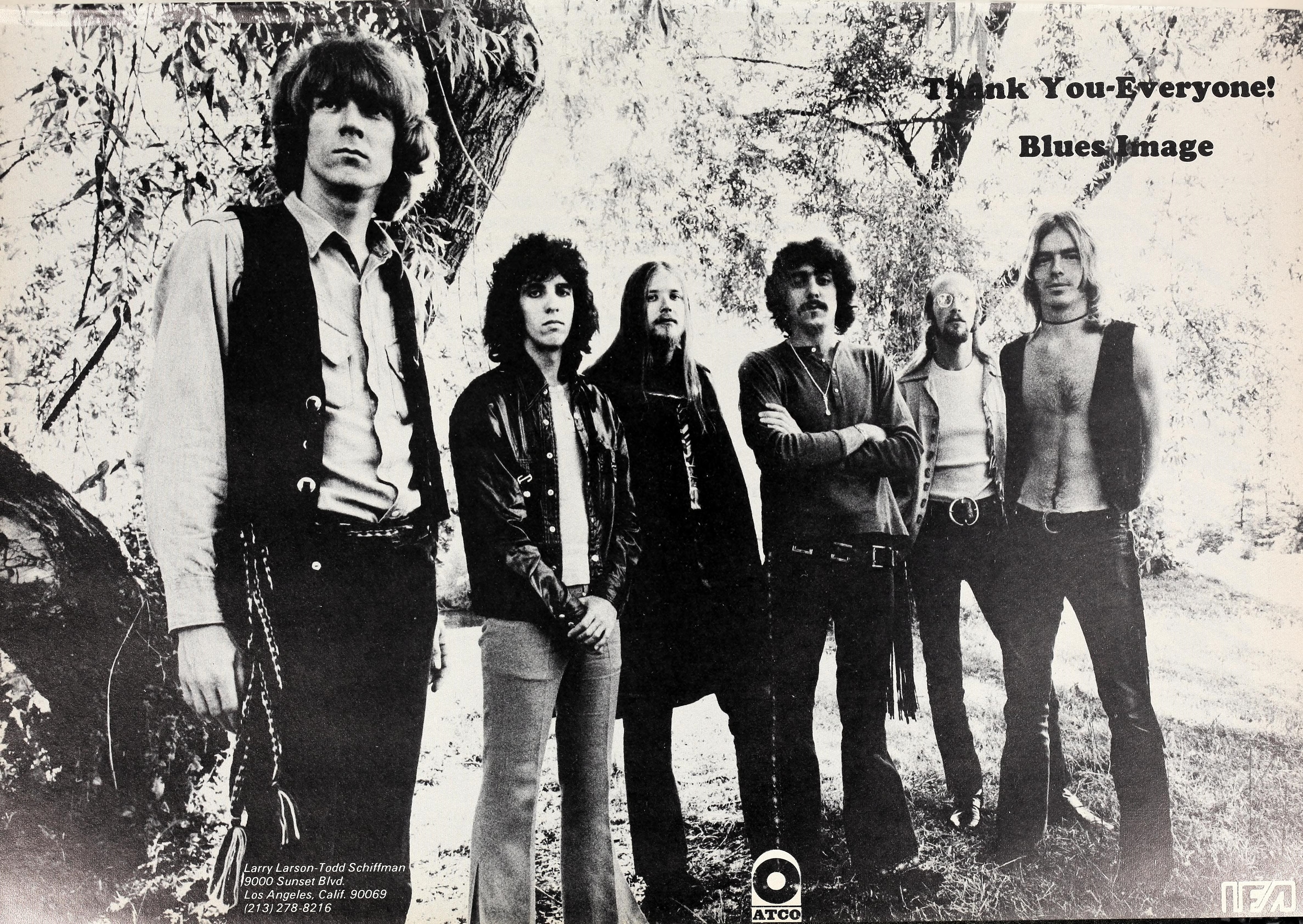
- Blues Image in 1970

Background information
- Origin: Tampa, Florida, U.S.
- Genres: Blues rock; hard rock
- Years active: 1966–1970
- Label: Atco
- Past members: Manuel "Manny" Bertematti; Joe Lala; Malcolm Jones; Mike Pinera; Emilio Garcia; Frank "Skip" Konte; Denny Correll; Kent Henry; Michael Franklin; Tim Franklin; Bill Britton

Blues Image was an American rock band. They had a hit in 1970 with "Ride Captain Ride", which reached No. 4 on both the Billboard Hot 100 and the Canadian RPM magazine charts.

== Career ==
Blues Image was formed in Tampa, Florida in 1966 by singer-guitarist Mike Pinera, singer-drummer Manuel "Manny" Bertematti, singer-percussionist Joe Lala, keyboardist Emilio Garcia, and bassist Malcolm Jones. They were later joined by keyboardist Frank "Skip" Konte when Emilio Garcia left the band to become a pilot. Blues Image moved to Miami in 1968, where they helped form an innovative new music venue, Thee Image. Blues Image became the house band at the club, which featured acts like Cream, Grateful Dead, and Blood, Sweat & Tears.

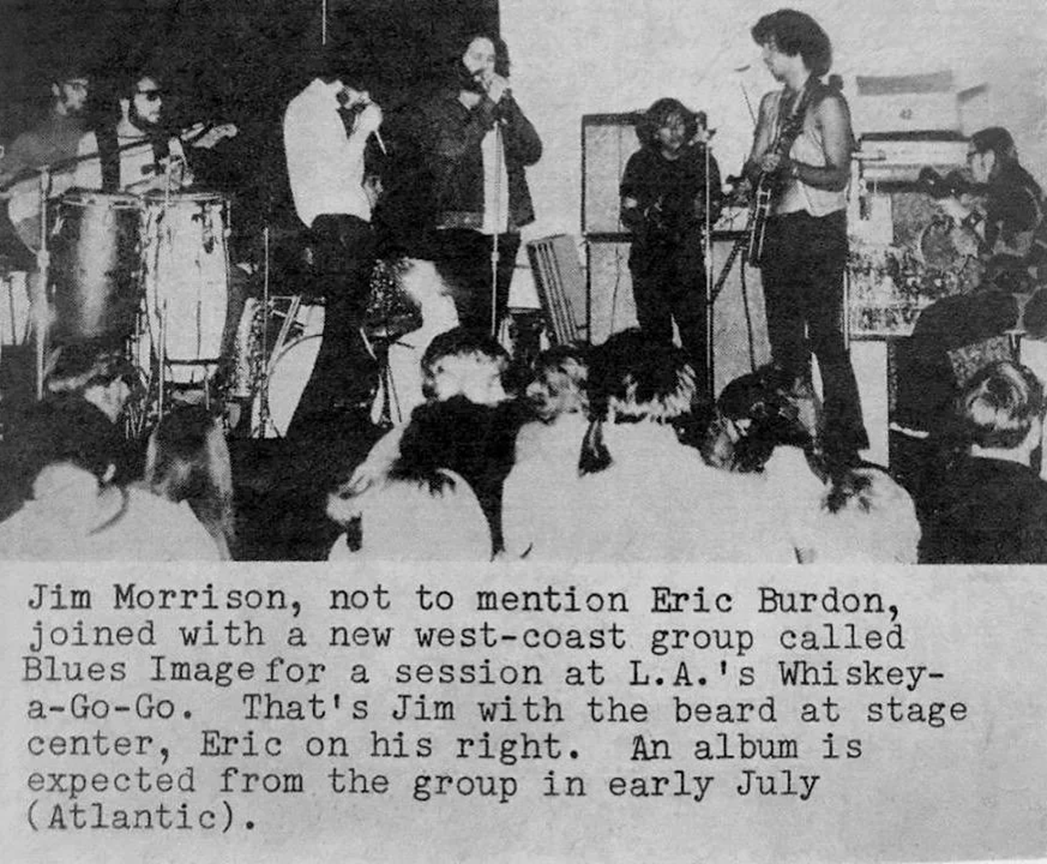
Blues Image onstage at The Whisky with Jim Morrison and Eric Burdon in May 1969

The band moved to Los Angeles and signed with Atco Records, releasing their self-titled debut album in February 1969. Their second album, Open was released in April 1970 and included the single "Ride Captain Ride." Written by Pinera and Konte, it featured Kent Henry on guitar solo and fills, with Pinera playing solo at the end. The album sold over one million copies, and earned a gold record from the R.I.A.A. in August 1970. It was Blues Image's only charting hit.

Pinera left the band to join Iron Butterfly in the fall of 1969, during the recording of Open, with Henry becoming his official replacement on guitar and new lead singer Denny Correll handling vocals. The band broke up after the release of their third album, Red White & Blues Image, in May 1970.

The various members of Blues Image went on to become parts of other rock bands. Bertematti later played and recorded with the New Cactus Band and toured with Iron Butterfly, Chi Coltrane, and Bobby Womack. Pinera also played with Iron Butterfly, New Cactus Band, Ramatam, and Alice Cooper. Konte joined Three Dog Night, and Lala played with Crosby, Stills, Nash & Young. Lala's percussion work also figures prominently on the Stephen Stills/Chris Hillman led group, Manassas. Henry played lead guitar with Steppenwolf prior to their breakup in 1972.

Correll later recorded a series of successful contemporary Christian music (CCM) albums, helped expand the genre's commercial appeal, and achieved airplay with several singles on CCM radio during the late 1970s and early 1980s. He died in 2002. Gary Dunham, who also toured with the last incarnation of Blues Image, also became a solo CCM artist.

Pinera released several solo albums, including In the Garden of Eden.

Kent Henry died on March 18, 2009, at the age of 60.

Joe Lala died of complications from lung cancer on March 18, 2014, at the age of 66.

Mike Pinera died of liver failure on November 20, 2024, at the age of 76.

The group can briefly be seen performing "Ride Captain Ride" in the 1971 film, Dusty and Sweets McGee.

== Personnel ==
- Manuel "Manny" Bertematti – drums, vocals (1966–1970)
- Joe Lala – percussion, vocals (1966-1970; died 2014)
- Malcolm Jones - bass (1966–1970)
- Mike Pinera – guitar, vocals (1966–1969; died 2024)
- Emilio Garcia – keyboards (1966–1967)
- Frank "Skip" Konte – keyboards (1967–1970)
- Denny Correll – vocals (1970; died 2002)
- Kent Henry – guitar (1970; died 2009)
- Michael Franklin
- Tim Franklin
- Bill Britton – guitar (1967–1969)
- Oscar Vildosola – drums (1970)

== Discography ==
=== Albums ===
Year	Album	Peak chart positions
Year	Album	US 200
1969	Blues Image	112
1970	Open	147
1970	Red White & Blues Image	—

=== Compilation albums ===
Year	Album
2005	Rhino Hi-Five : Blues Image

=== Singles ===
Year	Name	US Hot 100	Australia	Canada
1969	"Lay Your Sweet Love on Me"	—	—	—
1970	"Ride Captain Ride"	4	23	4
1970	"Gas Lamps and Clay"	81	58	88
1971	"Rise Up"	—	—	—
