= Til the World Ends (Three Dog Night song) =

Single by Three Dog Night

from the album Coming Down Your Way
- B-side: "Yo Te Quiero Hablar (Take You Down)"
- Released: July 1975
- Genre: Adult contemporary; soft rock
- Length: 3:31
- Label: ABC
- Songwriter: Dave Loggins
- Producers: Bob Monaco; Jimmy Ienner

Three Dog Night singles chronology
"Play Something Sweet (Brickyard Blues)" (1974)	"Til the World Ends" (1975)	"Everybody's a Masterpiece" (1976)

"Til the World Ends" is a song written by Dave Loggins and performed by rock band Three Dog Night, who in 1972 had had a Top 20 hit with Loggins' "Pieces of April": produced by Bob Monaco and Jimmy Ienner and arranged by Jimmie Haskell, "Til the World Ends" was featured on Three Dog Night's ninth studio album, Coming Down Your Way (1975).

The final Top 40 hit for Three Dog Night, "Til the World Ends" reached #32 on the Hot 100 in Billboard also ranking on the magazine's Adult Contemporary chart with a #11 peak. Outside of the US, "Til the World Ends" went to #26 on the Canadian pop chart in 1975, and reached #9 on the Canadian adult contemporary chart.
