= Hard Labor =

Studio album by Three Dog Night
- Released: March 6, 1974
- Recorded: 1973
- Studio: Record Plant, Sausalito, California
- Genre: Pop; rock
- Length: 35:51
- Label: Dunhill DSD-50168
- Producer: Jimmy Ienner

Three Dog Night chronology
Cyan (1973)	Hard Labor (1974)	Joy to the World: Their Greatest Hits (1974)

Singles from Hard Labor
- 1. "The Show Must Go On" Released: 1974; 2. "Sure As I'm Sittin' Here" Released: 1974; 3. "Play Something Sweet (Brickyard Blues)" Released: 1974

Alternative cover

Hard Labor is the eighth studio album by American rock band Three Dog Night, released in 1974. For this album, the band replaced long-time producer Richard Podolor with Jimmy Ienner, who was known for his production work with the Raspberries.

== Cover artwork ==
The original album cover, depicting the birth of a record album, was deemed too controversial and was first included with a manila file folder covering most of the cover. This was soon reworked with a huge Band-Aid covering the "birth". Subsequent printings had the Band-Aid printed directly on the cover. The packaging also includes an attached "birth record sheet" for the album. The CD reissue by MCA Records in the 1990s restored the cover to its original look showing the record.

== Critical reception ==
Professional ratings
Review scores
Source	Rating
AllMusic	2/5 stars
Circus Raves	Ear

Tom Von Malder of the Daily Herald called Hard Labor the band's finest record up to that point, applauding the production and finding the choice of songs representing the band at "its most competent, most mature level". Malder singled out "The Show Must Go On" and "I'd Be So Happy" as its two best, and "almost perfect", songs. Cash Box called Ienner's production "immaculate as always" and wrote that the album was marked by "mood changes both subtle and obvious", making it a "fantastic study in theatrical and musical contrast". Billboard found the track listing a "fine mix of material" and wrote that the instrumental section was "tight and almost perfect".

Circus Raves writer Jon Tiven gave the record "two ears"—indicating an album to "listen to ... 'til the grooves grow old" and wrote that the band "are the best when they're transforming half-arsed songs into good ones, but they run into trouble when the original rendition of the tune was fine in the first place (e.g. 'The Show Must Go On')." Writing retrospectively, Joseph McCombs of AllMusic felt that the album's preference for songs with solo vocals rather than the group's previous use of harmonies led to the band "los[ing] much of their soul and spirit" and saw the album as "show[ing] the growing cracks in the band's armor". Like Malder, McCombs found "I'd Be So Happy" and "The Show Must Go On" the highlights of the album.

== Track listing ==
Side A
No.	Title	Writer(s)	Lead vocals	Length
1.	"Prelude"	Public domain*	Instrumental	1:00
2.	"Sure As I'm Sittin' Here"	John Hiatt	Cory Wells	4:45
3.	"Anytime Babe"	Larry Weiss	Chuck Negron	3:07
4.	"Put Out the Light"	Daniel Moore	Wells	3:06
5.	"Sitting in Limbo"	Gully Bright, Jimmy Cliff	Danny Hutton	5:03

Side B
No.	Title	Writer(s)	Lead vocals	Length
1.	"I'd Be So Happy"	Skip Prokop	Negron	4:48
2.	"Play Something Sweet (Brickyard Blues)"	Allen Toussaint	Wells	4:48
3.	"On the Way Back Home"	Moore	Hutton, Negron, Wells	4:16
4.	"The Show Must Go On"	David Courtney, Leo Sayer	Negron	4:24

- While the first track "Prelude" may have been in the Public Domain in 1974, it does have a title and writer: "Entrance of the Gladiators" is a military march composed in 1897 by the Czech composer Julius Fučík. Likewise, the introduction of their cover of Leo Sayer's The Show Must Go On also quotes the Fučík march.

== Personnel ==
- Mike Allsup – banjo, guitars
- Jimmy Greenspoon – keyboards
- Danny Hutton – lead vocals (5, 8), background vocals
- Skip Konte – keyboards, ARP, chamberlin
- Chuck Negron – lead vocals (3, 6, 8, 9), background vocals
- Jack Ryland – bass
- Joe Schermie – bass
- Floyd Sneed – drums, percussion
- Cory Wells – lead vocals (2, 7, 8), background vocals
- Jimmy Ienner – production

== Production ==
- Producer: Jimmy Ienner
- Engineers: Greg Calbi, Roy Cicala, Dennis Ferrante, Jimmy Ienner, Jay Messina, Tom Rabstenek, John Stronach
- Assistant engineers: Corky Stasiak
- Remixing: Roy Cicala, Jay Messina
- Arranger: Three Dog Night
- Art direction and photography: Ed Caraeff
- Design: David Larkham

== Charts ==
Album charts
Chart (1974)	Peak position
Australia (Kent Music Report)	61
Japan Oricon	50
US Top 200	20
Canada	16

Singles charts
Year	Single	Chart	Position
1974	"The Show Must Go On"	US Pop Singles	4
1974	"The Show Must Go On"	US Cash Box	1
1974	"The Show Must Go On"	US Record World	1
1974	"The Show Must Go On"	US Radio & Records	3
1974	"The Show Must Go On"	Canada Pop Singles	2
1974	"The Show Must Go On"	Germany Top 100	12
1974	"The Show Must Go On"	Netherlands Top 100	6
1974	"The Show Must Go On"	Belgium Ultratop	23
1974	"The Show Must Go On"	Japan Oricon Singles Chart	77
1974	"Sure As I'm Sittin' Here"	US Pop Singles	16
1974	"Sure As I'm Sittin' Here"	US Cash Box	18
1974	"Sure As I'm Sittin' Here"	US Record World	22
1974	"Sure As I'm Sittin' Here"	Canada Pop Singles	18
1974	"Play Something Sweet (Brickyard Blues)"	US Pop Singles	33
1974	"Play Something Sweet (Brickyard Blues)"	US Cash Box	26
1974	"Play Something Sweet (Brickyard Blues)"	US Record World	24
1974	"Play Something Sweet (Brickyard Blues)"	Canada Pop Singles	25

== Certifications ==
Region	Certification	Certified units/sales
United States (RIAA)	Gold	500,000^{^}
^{^} Shipments figures based on certification alone.
