= Howard Thomas Hogan Sr. =

American judge

Howard Thomas Hogan Sr. (December 20, 1905 – April 8, 1998) was a New York State Supreme Court Justice who was a law partner of Leonard W. Hall (1900–1979), Chairman of the National Republican Committee (1953–1957). His son is Howard Thomas Hogan Jr., also a lawyer and the Director of the First of Long Island Corporation. Howard Thomas Hogan Sr. resided until his death on North Main Street in Farmingdale, New York adjacent to the Bethpage State Park Golf Course.
