= Denny Correll =

Singer (1945–2002)

Dennis "Denny" Correll (February 19, 1946 – November 29, 2002) was a singer in the 1960s rock music group Blues Image as well as a contemporary Christian musician active in the 1970s. In the late 1980s and early 1990s Correll performed solo vocals on 4 songs on 4 albums of The Maranatha Singers. He was an early touring member of the seminal Jesus music band Love Song, writing their tune "Changes" which appeared on that band's debut LP Love Song. He also was in the band Manna prior to his own solo contemporary Christian music career.

Correll died from heart failure on November 29, 2002. He was 56.

== Discography ==
- Standin' in the Light Maranatha! Records MM0058 1979.
- How Will They Know? Myrrh Records MSB-6656 1980.
- Something I Believe In Myrrh Records MSB-6699 1982.
- Living Water Myrrh Records 7016769062 1983.
- Trust Maranatha! Records CORR-TRU2-CD 1991.
- Emily's Eyes Broken Records. vocal on "Lies" A child abuse compilation album.
