= April Lawton =

American musician (1948–2006)

- Genres: Rock, psychedelic rock, hard rock, jazz fusion
- Instruments: Guitar, vocals
- Years active: 1972–2006
- Formerly of: Ramatam

April Lawton (July 30, 1948 – November 23, 2006) was a guitarist and composer who rose to some prominence in the early to mid-1970s as a member of the band Ramatam, which also included Iron Butterfly guitarist Mike Pinera and the former Jimi Hendrix drummer Mitch Mitchell, as well as Russ Smith (bass, vocals), and Tommy Sullivan (keyboards, reeds, vocals). Her playing style was a mix of Jeff Beck, Hendrix, and Allan Holdsworth.

Lawton gave no interviews, refused to discuss her past, and was rumoured to be transgender; a claim repeated by Fanny guitarist June Millington in a 2010 interview for GuitarGearHeads. Singer Dee Snider claimed Lawton was still male while in the band Johnny Maestro and the Brooklyn Bridge. Mike Pinera, former bandmate, made a statement in Guitar Player magazine regarding Lawton's gender: "I can attest to her being a woman," declared Pinera. "When I asked her about the rumors, she took my hand and gave me a 'first base' account. I know they have technology for that now, but, back then, no way!"

Lawton stayed with Ramatam for two studio albums, their self-titled debut (1972, Atlantic) and In April Came the Dawning of the Red Suns. The group was not commercially successful, and Lawton left after the second album, forming a short-lived solo project called the April Lawton Band, which dissolved in the late 1970s. Lawton then left the music scene to concentrate on painting and graphic design. Her personal life remained very private until her death from heart failure at her home on November 23, 2006, aged 58.

During the 1990s she recorded demos for a future album, and the material remains unreleased. Some brief excerpts are available at the April Lawton tribute website.
