= George F. Titterton =

American design engineer

- Born: 19 August 1904; New York, New York, U.S.
- Died: 12 January 1998 (aged 93); Farmingdale, New York, U.S.
- Education: New York University
- Occupations: Senior Vice President, Grumman Corporation
- Known for: Lunar Excursion Module; F4F Wildcat; F6F Hellcat
- Spouse: Ada Ryan (1909–2002) 1929–1998 (his death)
- Children: George Jr., Eileen, Edith, Ann, Paul, John, and Ada

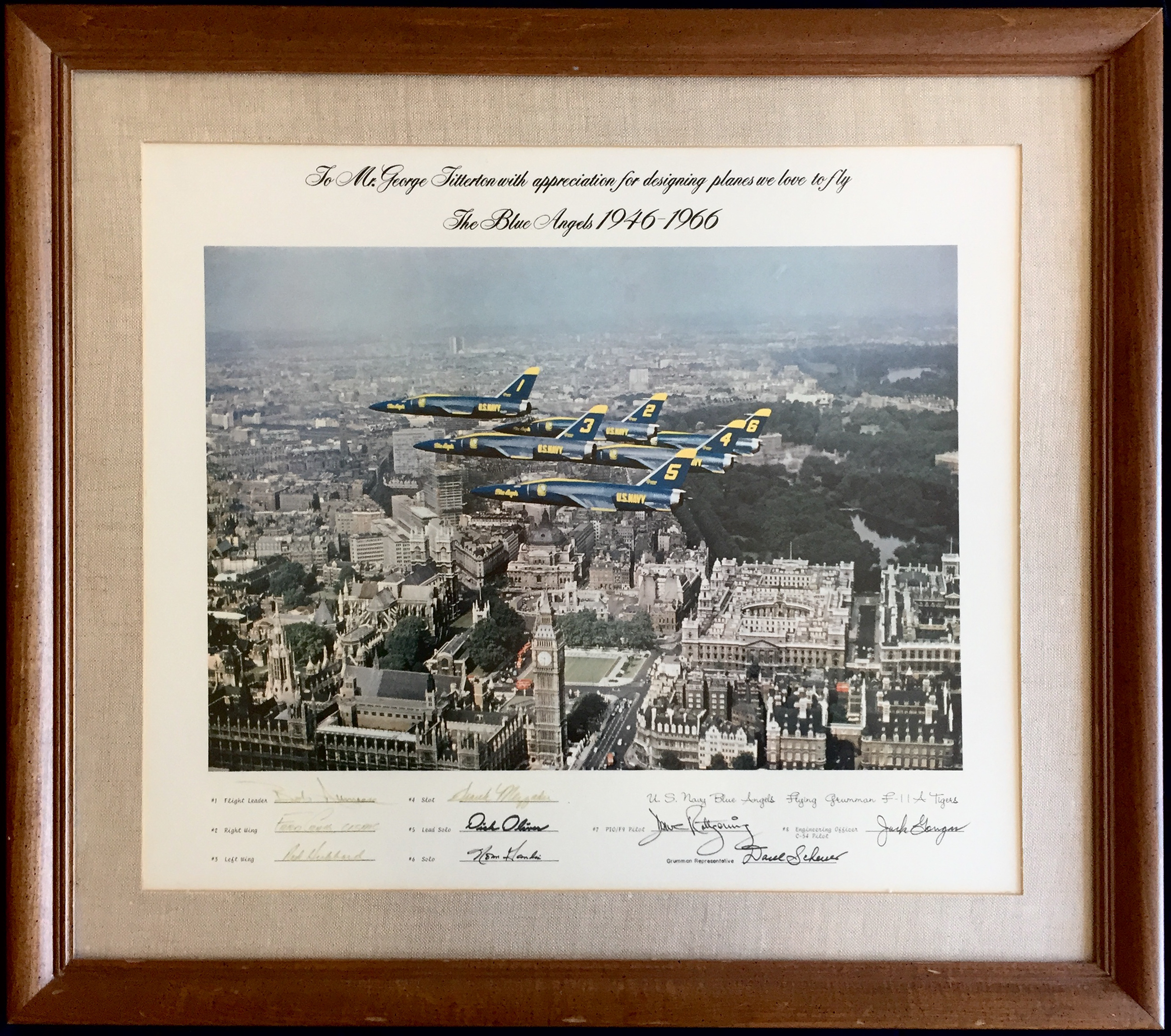
1963 Blue Angels appreciation - George F. Titterton

George F. Titterton (19 August 1904 in New York City, New York – 12 January 1998) was a design engineer and Senior Vice-President of the Grumman Corporation.

== Personal life ==
Titterton married Ada Ryan on October 6, 1929.

== Career history ==
After graduating from New York University in 1925 with a degree in Mechanical Engineering, George remained as an instructor in Engineering for a year. He then joined the Navy Bureau of Aeronautics in Washington, D.C. George became a Consulting Engineer in 1927, specializing in structural analysis of commercial airplanes. During this period, he authored 15 articles for Aviation magazine which were later published in book form under the title, Airplane stress analysis: an introductory treatise. In early 1928, George joined Keystone Aircraft and later assumed the position of Chief Engineer for Huntington Aircraft in Stratford, Connecticut where he designed and built two small commercial airplanes.

In 1931, George was employed by the Navy Inspection Office as an Aeronautical Engineer stationed at the General Inspector of Naval Aircraft Office in New York City. In 1933, he became the resident inspector for the U.S. Navy at the Navy Aircraft Office located at Grumman Aircraft, then in Farmingdale, New York. In this capacity, Mr. Titterton was a "watchdog" for the Navy's interests and created numerous memos documenting suggestions for improvement in the Grumman production process as was (and still is) typical of a government agency overseeing its contractors. During his three-year stay there, he was awarded a degree in Aeronautical Engineering by New York University.

Mr. Titterton joined Grumman on April 1, 1936, as a Project Engineer. His first assignment, much to the amusement of Grumman founders Roy Grumman and Bill Schwendler, was to address a rather large stack of Navy complaint memos which he himself wrote. The following year he wrote his second book Aircraft Materials and Processes published by Pittman and Company. This second book is still used as reference materials in various countries in order to obtain a commercial aviation license. During his early years at Grumman, Titterton was the project engineer for both of Grumman's Gulfhawk models. He was appointed Assistant Chief Engineer in Charge of Production Airplanes in 1939 and in 1950 took on the duties of Contract Coordinator.

In April 1955, he was named Assistant Vice President and in October the same year was promoted to Vice President – Contracts. Six years later, George was named Vice President – Program Management with responsibility for the executive direction of all contracts. In 1963, after leading in negotiating the contract with NASA to build the Lunar Excursion Module, he became Senior Vice President – Operations with responsibilities varying in time and breadth for all aircraft, spacecraft, and marine programs.

As a member of the "Top Management Review Board" for the Apollo Lunar Module project, Mr. Titterton was influential in its engineering design decisions. When the first delivery of the lunar module did not meet NASA quality standards, George replaced Tom Kelly as overall project manager for Grumman Corporation's Lunar Excursion Module contract with NASA. George's reputation for correcting large production problems with complex projects at Grumman made him the ideal choice to ensure the success of the Apollo Lunar Module project and he did so. Around this time, George created 100 copies of a hardcover book entitled Alibis That Stuck containing one page, upon which was written "There ain't none". This book was distributed to Grumman employees at the plant.

Finally, in the end of 1968, Mr. Titterton retired from Grumman, remaining as a member of its board of directors for several years afterward. George joined the Grumman retirees club and toured the country speaking at retiree club functions until a few years before his death in 1998.

Mr. Titterton resided until his death on Fairview Road in the Old Lenox Hills neighborhood of Farmingdale.

Works

- Airplane stress analysis: an introductory treatise (1929) (with Alexander Klemin)
- Aircraft Materials and Processes (1937,1941,1947,1951,1956)
- Alibis That Stuck (196?) – Not officially published.
