= Ride Captain Ride =

1970 single by Blues Image

Single by Blues Image

from the album Open
- B-side: "Pay My Dues"
- Released: 1970
- Genre: Rock; hard rock
- Length: 3:45; 3:07 (7" version)
- Label: Atco / Atlantic
- Songwriters: Mike Pinera, Frank Konte
- Producer: Richard Podolor

Blues Image singles chronology
"Lay Your Sweet Love on Me" (1969)	"Ride Captain Ride" (1970)	"Gas Lamps and Clay" (1970)

"Ride Captain Ride" is a song recorded by the American rock band Blues Image. It was co-written by the band's singer-guitarist Mike Pinera and keyboardist Frank "Skip" Konte and was included on the group's 1970 album, Open. Released as a slightly shortened single in the spring of 1970, it shot up the charts, eventually reaching No. 4 in the US and Canadian charts, making it Blues Image's only Top 40 chart hit. It reached No. 23 in Australia.

The longer version repeats the chorus several times before the instrumental coda leaves the song.

The guitar fills, and main solo were performed by Kent Henry. Pinera plays the guitar solo at the end of the song.

The number of keys on Pinera's Rhodes piano inspired the song. Pinera said, "Okay, I need a first word. And what came into my head was '73.' I liked the rhythm, and I went, '73 men sailed up, from the San Francisco Bay.'...The song sort of just wrote itself from there."

In the lyrics, the crew invites others to ride to a new land where they will feel free. However, the local people are too preoccupied with life's troubles to hear or answer their call. When the crew sets sail, they are never seen or heard from again. The Captain rides with his crew on a mystery ship, which disappears forever.

== Chart history ==
=== Weekly charts ===
Chart (1970)	Peak position
Australia (Kent Music Report)	23
Canada RPM Top Singles	4
U.S. Billboard Hot 100	4
U.S. Cash Box Top 100	5

=== Year-end charts ===
Chart (1970)	Rank
Canada	84
U.S. Billboard Hot 100	32
U.S. Cash Box	28

== Certifications ==
Region	Certification	Certified units/sales
United States (RIAA)	Gold	1,000,000^{^}
^{^} Shipments figures based on certification alone.

== Covers ==
The song was covered by Blood, Sweat & Tears in the album New City from 1975.

The song has been performed live many times by Phish with Page McConnell on lead vocals, notably during the "Ian's Farm" show on May 28, 1989.
