= Play Something Sweet (Brickyard Blues) =

Single by Three Dog Night

from the album Hard Labor
- B-side: "I'd Be So Happy"
- Released: October 1974
- Genre: Pop rock
- Length: 3:32 (single version); 4:48 (album version)
- Label: Dunhill
- Songwriter(s): Allen Toussaint
- Producer(s): Jimmy Ienner

Three Dog Night singles chronology
"Sure As I'm Sittin' Here" (1974)	"Play Something Sweet (Brickyard Blues)" (1974)	"Til the World Ends" (1975)

Official audio
- "Play Something Sweet (Brickyard Blues)" on YouTube

"Play Something Sweet (Brickyard Blues)" is a composition by New Orleans rhythm and blues singer and songwriter Allen Toussaint which, in 1974, became a top 40 hit for Three Dog Night.

== Song history ==
The song was first popularized in 1974, following its initial 1973 inclusion on the album Bazaar by disco-funk artist Sylvester, when it was recorded and released by five artists in one year: Frankie Miller (on High Life), B. J. Thomas (on Longhorns & Londonbridges), Three Dog Night (on Hard Labor), the James Montgomery Band (as "Brickyard Blues" on High Roller) and Maria Muldaur (as "Brickyard Blues" on Waitress in a Donut Shop). Besides his version of "Brickyard Blues"—so entitled—included on his High Life album and serving as B-side of his non-charting single "Little Angel", Frankie Miller's live take on "Brickyard Blues" may be heard on the 1975 multi-artist live album Over the Rainbow recorded on 16 March 1975 at the Rainbow Theatre, where Miller was backed by Procol Harum. "Brickyard Blues" was also recorded in 1974 by Little Feat, during the course of the Feats Don't Fail Me Now recording sessions. This version was not released until 2000, when it was included in the retrospective compilation Hotcakes & Outtakes: 30 Years of Little Feat (Rhino).

Ensuant to the August 1974 single release of the James Montgomery Band's version of "Brickyard Blues", the Three Dog Night version of "Play Something Sweet (Brickyard Blues)" was issued in September 1974 as the third single off the Hard Labor album, which had already generated the hits "The Show Must Go On" and "Sure As I'm Sittin' Here", which would prove to be respectively the group's final top ten and top thirty hits. "Play Something Sweet" became the lowest-charting Three Dog Night single since their 1968 debut disc, "Nobody", had stalled in Billboard's Bubbling Under Hot 100 ranking, the Billboard Hot 100 peak of "Play Something Sweet" being No. 33, while on the hit parade for Canada—as featured in RPM—"Play Something Sweet" was ranked at No. 25. The top 30 shortfall of "Play Something Sweet" signaled a permanent downturn in the chart fortunes of Three Dog Night, as their follow-up single had a similar mid chart impact with a Billboard Hot 100 peak of No. 32, and was the group's final Hot 100 entry.

Later versions of the song were recorded by Levon Helm (1978), Herman Brood (1980 on Wait a Minute) and Toots Thielemans (1993). Toussaint's own version of his song originally appeared on a compilation called Live at the New Orleans Jazz and Heritage Festival 1976, featuring sets by many of his Crescent City contemporaries. A later version is found on Hot as a Pistol, Keen as a Blade (Hip-O, 2006), a DVD recording of Toussaint's 2006 performance at the Festival International de Jazz de Montréal, performing with Elvis Costello.

It was the last song publicly performed by Allen Toussaint before he died on November 10, 2015.

The song was covered, in 1984, by Helen Shapiro as a single for Oval Records, and was later included on the Ace Records compilation album Rhythm On The Radio - Oval Records Singles 1974-1987.

A. J. Croce recorded "Brickyard Blues" for his 2021 album By Request. Croce summarized the song as being "about a woman who is tired of seeing her musician partner perform, because she's seen it all before. She's supportive of him, but never wants to see another show again".
