= Sure As I'm Sittin' Here =

Single by Three Dog Night

from the album Hard Labor
- B-side: "Anytime Babe"
- Released: June 1974
- Genre: Rock
- Length: 4:45 (album); 3:07 (single)
- Label: Dunhill 15001
- Songwriter: John Hiatt
- Producer: Jimmy Ienner

Three Dog Night singles chronology
"The Show Must Go On" (1974)	"Sure As I'm Sittin' Here" (1974)	"Play Something Sweet (Brickyard Blues)" (1974)

"Sure As I'm Sittin' Here" is a song written and originally performed by John Hiatt. Hiatt released the original version of the song as a single in February, 1974, and included it on his debut album Hangin' Around the Observatory. Hiatt's version of "Sure As I'm Sittin' Here" failed to chart.

== Other Versions ==
- Three Dog Night released the song as a single in mid 1974, where it reached #16 on the Billboard chart and #18 in Canada in 1974. Three Dog Night's version of "Sure As I'm Sittin' Here" was produced by Jimmy Ienner. It was featured on their 1974 album, Hard Labor. Though they would make the top 40 in both US and Canada with two further singles, this was Three Dog Night's final top 20 hit.
