= Michael T. Franklin =

American musician and record producer (born 1952)

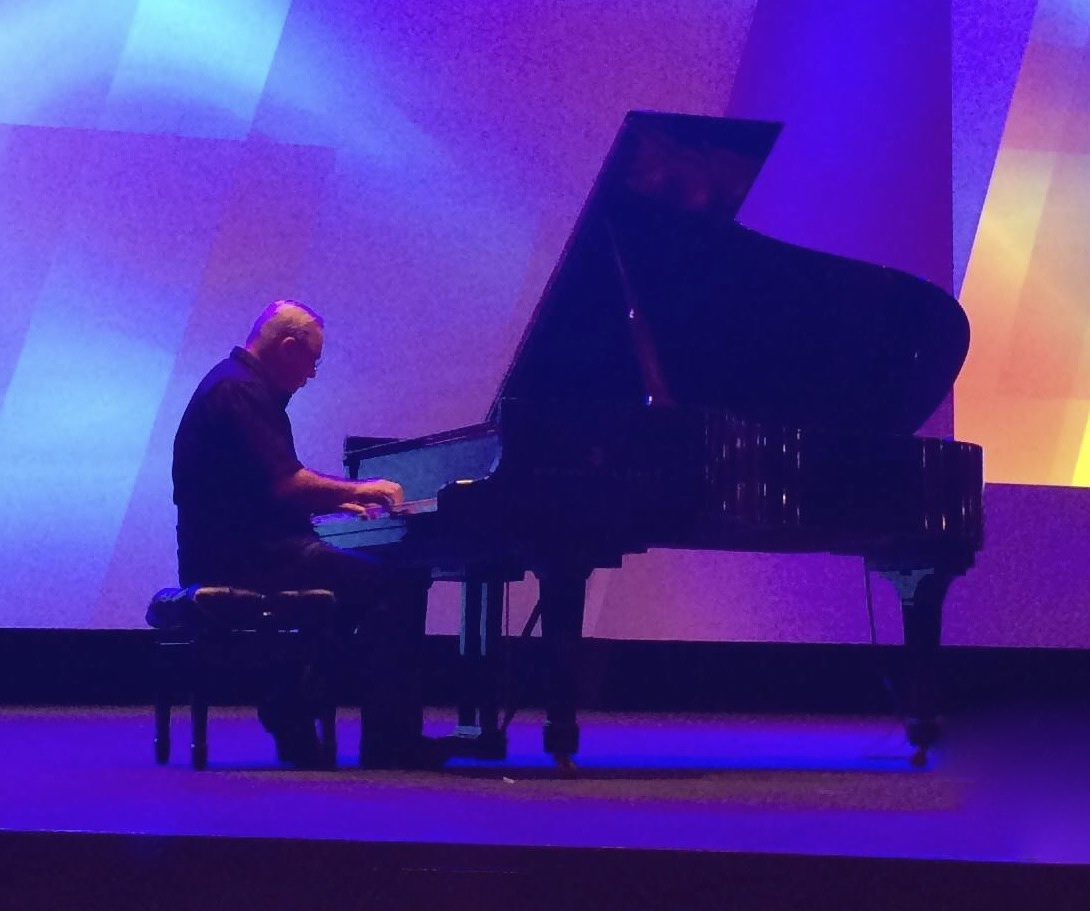
- Michael Franklin in concert at the Beijing World Center in 2014

Background information
- Born: April 16, 1952 (age 74); Buffalo, New York, U.S.
- Genres: Rock, jazz, classical, fusion
- Occupations: Musician, producer
- Instruments: Keyboard, vocals

Michael T. Franklin (born April 16, 1952) is an American musician and record producer.

== Biography ==
=== Early career ===
Michael Thomas Franklin was born in Buffalo, New York, United States. As a producer, keyboard player and vocalist, he began his career performing in a local Buffalo band called the Movement. The group had a regional hit in 1966 with "Left Silently". In 1969 his family relocated to Chesterton, Indiana, where he performed with several local groups, including GUM, Polyphemus and Rafter After.

In 1974 Franklin started his first recording studio Futuresound, in Beverly Shores, Indiana, where he would record and produce Danny & the Juniors, Eldee Young, Lou Christie, and the Drifters, among others, leading to a 1982 Grammy nomination for best recording of Reggae Tribute, Warner/Electra/Asylum, on location in Montego Bay, Jamaica.

In 1984 he recorded his first solo jazz CD, Jazz Vein. The album featured his brother Tim Franklin on bass, Barry Sperti on sax, and Paul Parker on drums. It also featured Chuck Leavell on keys and Laudir de Oliveira on percussion. Later that year, Franklin formed the original music group Lost Weekend which had regional success and recorded a self-titled album. Lost Weekend became Rockin Robin, a backup band that accompanied national acts around the country.

=== Wolfman Jack ===
That same year, in 1984, Franklin met Wolfman Jack and became his bandleader, touring around the country.

In 1986 Franklin relocated to Orlando, Florida, to become music director of Little Darlin's Rock n’ Roll Palace. He planned to pay back his friend Wolfman for his years of support by convincing producers to use Wolfman as the host of a new television show, Rock and Roll Palace TV Shows. The show was filmed at Little Darlin's, and in Nashville and Baltimore. Franklin negotiated to change the club name to "Wolfman Jack's Rock and Roll Palace".

He music directed over 180 TV shows, most with Wolfman Jack as the host.

=== Studio work ===
In the 1980s, Franklin did session work for the Staple Singers, Middle of the Road, Shut up and Drive and others. He also composed music for Michael Jay and Signature soundtrack libraries.

In the nineties he began producing music for cartoons such as Felix the Cat and Hello Kitty. Working from his own studio, he produced CDs for Tommy Roe, Gloria Gaynor, Spencer Davis, Edgar Winter, Toto's Bobby Kimball and others.

In 1992 he traveled to the Isle of Man to produce Classic Tracks for Rick Wakeman of Yes. While mixing in Philadelphia he recorded with Puck and Nat on the Beverly Hills, 90210 soundtrack.

In January 1992 he and the band performed with Bruce Hornsby at the Super Bowl.

In September 1992 he joined the Crickets for the opening of the musical Buddy, with Paul McCartney.

In 1993 he produced Windows of Time for his friend Patrick Moraz.

=== Hard Rock ===
After Wolfman's death in 1995, Franklin became music director of Hard Rock Live in Orlando from 1998 to 2001, performing with classic artists as band leader. Franklin performed alongside Joe Walsh, Bruce Hornsby, Leslie West, Edgar Winter, Melanie Safka, Don Mclean, Rick Derringer, Bobby Kimball and others.

He would also appear on events as keyboard player for Chuck Berry's 70 and 75 birthday dates.

=== Japan, China and Inventions ===
Starting in 1992, with Rockin Robin, Franklin traveled to Japan several times. In 1998, he composed music for Felix the Cat's Musical Adventure, with Hello Kitty, for Felix the Cat productions. Beginning in 2001, Franklin produced music in China, working with some of the biggest Chinese stars, such as Andy Hui, Lang Lang, A-Mei and others.

He began spending the majority of the year in China, where he began working on entertainment productions and his own electronics design business. After visiting China several times he saw an opportunity to bring an American-style carnival to the mainland. After months of meetings and working with numerous potential stakeholders American International Carnival was born. The first large scale American carnival company to play to millions of people in Tianjin, Nanning, Taiyuan and Shenyang.

Franklin invented the Volt, a solar charger for iPhone and then iPad, and worked with Optimum Solar to develop "The Plug and Play", a totally self-contained solar power plant, both products selling globally.

=== Return to the States ===
Franklin continues to produce from Beijing and Orlando. In 2014, he returned to the United States to resume his music full-time. He opened Solar Studios and started the Solar Music label, where has produced many project for the label. Pat Travers, Randi Paul, Little Anthony, Terry Sylvester of the Hollies, Heather Rice, Fei Peng, Mike Pinera, Blues Image, Larry Coryell and most recently Jon Anderson of Yes and Robby Steinhardt, the original violinist and vocalist of the band Kansas.

=== Jon Anderson "1000 Hands Chapter One" ===
Franklin recorded arrangements for Jon Anderson of Yes in 1996, though songwriter, Brian Chatton, however the project went dormant for many years. In July 2015, Franklin traveled to California to perform at the Bakersfield Music Festival with Iron Butterfly. Franklin used some of the original music and transformed that with his orchestration and use on many appearances by artists he believe would make it work. Chick Corea, Ian Anderson, Billy Cobham, Tower of Power, Jean Luc Ponty, Larry Coryell, and many other. This limited release led to highly acclaimed 2019 tour "Jon Anderson 1000 Hands Chapter 1". The album project was released worldwide by Blue Elan Records, July 31, 2020. Chapter 2 featuring many other artists and new songs set for 2027.

=== Robbt Steinhardt "Not in Kansas Anymore" ===
Franklin's friendship with the violinist Robby Steinhardt, former of Kansas began during the recording of Jon Anderson 1000 Hands Chapter One. Robby performed on "Activate" and one of Michael's songs featuring Mahavishnu Drummer Billy Cobham. This started a year long collaboration with Steinhardt and Michael's bassist brother Tim Franklin, to write songs for an album. As with 1000 Hands, Franklin invited many great artist to perform on "Not in Kansas Anymore". Ian Anderson, Steve Morse, Rayford Griffin,Pat Travers, Lisa Fischer, Chuck Leavell, Billy Ashbaugh, Liberty Devitto and others.The Song "Truth to Power", was nominated by Prog Magazine as Song of the Year. Shortly after the release a tour was in the works. Unfortunately, Robby became ill and passed before that could become a reality.

== Discography ==
Artist	Title	Year
The Movement	Left Silently	1968
Michael Franklin	Future Star	1972
Michael Franklin	Old House	1974
Michael Franklin	Beverly Shores Massacre & other Love Songs	1978
Franklin Brothers	Xmas Treeo	1981
Northern Indiana Choir	Northern Indiana Choir	1982
Michael Franklin	Rivers of The World	1982
Angie Fradocus	Angie Fradocus	1982
Various Artists	Reggae Tribute	1982
Ellen Dolak	Morning Light	1983
Ellen Dolak	Jumpin Up and Down for You	1984
Ron Buffington	The Harmony is Missing	1985
Michael Franklin	Jazz Vein	1984
Lost Weekend	Lost Weekend	1984
Michael Franklin	State of the Art Christmas	1985
Tim Franklin	Honorable Quest	1986
Various Artists	Legends of Rock and Roll	1987
Various Artists	Rock and Roll Palace	1989
Various Artists	Rock and Roll Christmas	1990
Rick Wakeman	Classic Tracks	1992
Various Artists	Beverly Hills 91210	1992
Melanie Safka	Freedom Knows My Name	1993
Melanie Safka	Silence Is King	1993
Patrick Moraz	Windows of Time	1994
Timmy Flaherty	Dream of Erin	1994
Rockin Robin	Reruns	1994
Pat Travers	Half Way to Somewhere	1995
Melanie Safka	Beautiful People	1995
Carl Gardner	One Cool Cat	1996
Big Bopper Junior	Legacy of the Big Bopper	1997
Pat Travers	Blues Tracks 2	1998
Jon Anderson	Uzlot (unreleased)	1998
Margarita Medina	Margarita	1998
Melanie Safka	Ruby Tuesday	2000
Various Artists	Black Cat Blues	2000
Rockin Robin	Live on the Radio	2001
Melanie Safka	Beautiful People	2001
Melanie Safka	Summer of Love	2003
Tommy Roe	Salute	2003
Melanie Safka	Shine On	2003
Kristie Deluca	Analyze	2004
Melanie Safka	Moments From My Life	2004
Melanie Safka	Dust In The Wind	2004
Avo Uveszian	Legacy	2004
Doctor Hook	Hookah	2005
Karyn Uvezian	Karyn	2005
Spencer Davis	Spencer Davis	2006
Gary Puckett	Gary Puckett's Greatest Hits	2007
Gloria Gaynor	Christmas Presence	2008
Don Orilio	When You Gotta Go	2012
Jon Anderson	1000 Hands Chapter One	2019
Randi Paul	Insight	2020
Michael and Tim Franklin	Virtual Smorgasborg	to be released 2022
Michael and Tim Franklin	Anahata	to be released 2022
Michael Franklin	Forgotten Secrets	in progress
Tim Franklin	Wow	in progress
Robby Steinhart	Not in Kansas Anymore	10/25/2021
Michael Winslow	TBA	in progress
Jon Anderson	1000 Hands Chapter 2	in progress
Kristie Deluca	Voices in My Head	01/2022
Blues Image	Next Voyage	scheduled release 2022
Fei Peng	Curious	scheduled release 2022
Abigail Hunang	Chick Corea's Children's Songs	scheduled release 2022
Tommy Roe	From Here to Here	2023
Brian Hyland	Sealed with a Kiss 60th Aniversay (single)	2023
Heather Rice	Fingers	2025
Michael and Timothy Franklin	Anahata	2025
