= Mike Pinera =

American guitarist, singer and songwriter (1948–2024)

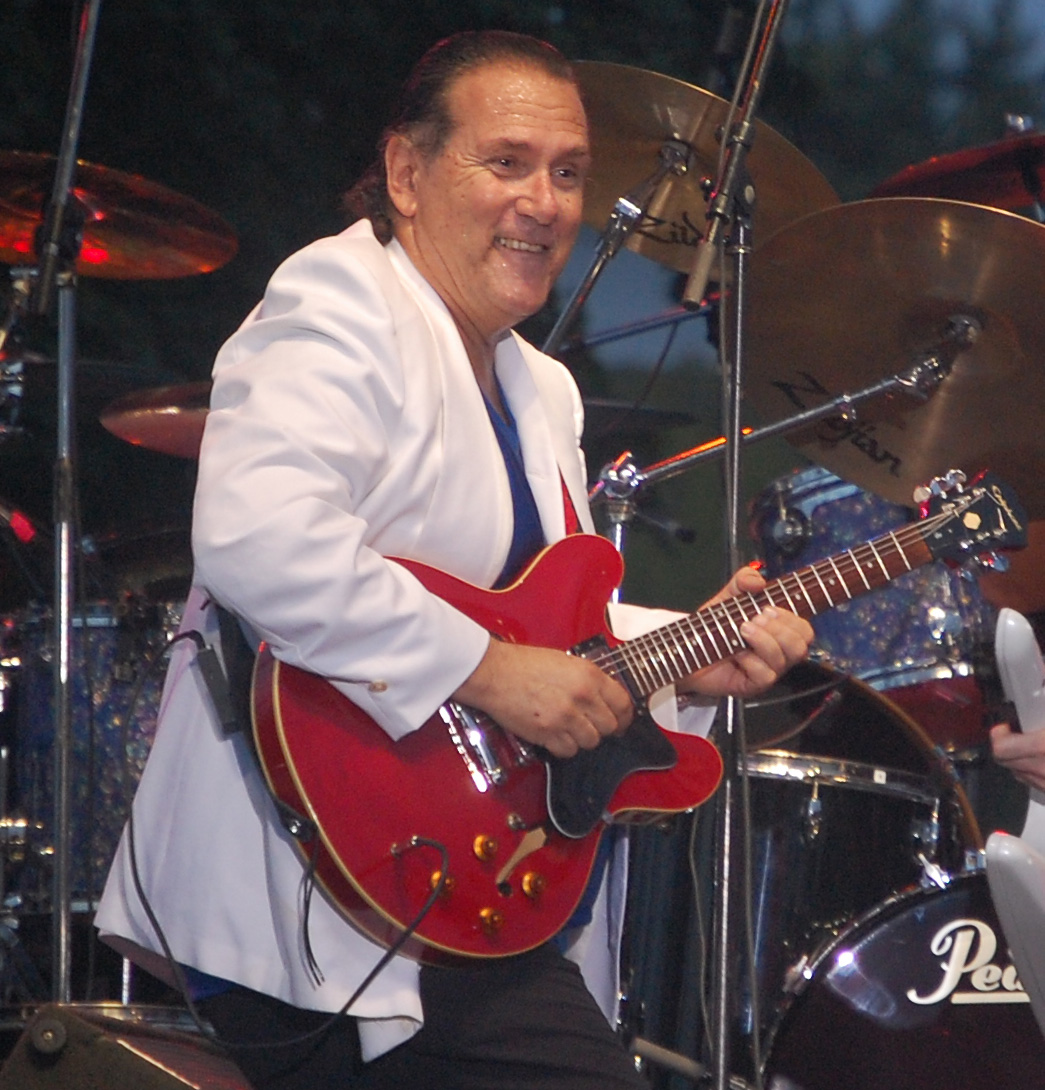
- Pinera performing in 2009

Background information
- Born: Carlos Michael Pinera; September 29, 1948; Tampa, Florida, U.S.
- Died: November 20, 2024 (aged 76)
- Genre: Rock
- Occupations: Musician; singer; songwriter; producer
- Instruments: Guitar; vocals
- Years active: 1960s–2024
- Label: Atco

Carlos Michael Pinera (September 29, 1948 – November 20, 2024) was an American guitarist, singer, songwriter and producer who started professionally in the late 1960s with the group Blues Image, which had a number 4 hit in 1970 with their song "Ride Captain Ride". After the breakup of that group, he joined Iron Butterfly, and later formed the group Ramatam. Pinera was then the founding member of the band New Cactus, a later incarnation of the band Cactus. He was the lead guitarist for Alice Cooper from 1980 to 1982.

== Career ==
=== Early years ===
Mike Pinera and his group Blues Image were co-founders and house band at Thee Image, a Miami Beach concert venue they opened and co-headlined on weekends, playing with such groups as Cream, Grateful Dead, the Yardbirds, The Animals, Frank Zappa and many more. Blues Image soon signed with Atlantic Records where they scored the major hit "Ride Captain Ride" (1970), which Pinera co-wrote and sang.

Pinera joined Iron Butterfly in 1970, and recorded the album Metamorphosis. He was one of the first guitarists to use the "Guitar Talk Box" which is featured on the song "Butterfly Bleu", which was written by Pinera. The album reached the top 20 and has achieved multi-platinum status.

In 1972, Pinera and Jimi Hendrix's drummer Mitch Mitchell formed the band Ramatam on Atlantic Records, and was produced by Tom Dowd, who was quoted as saying this album was one of his all time favorites.

In 1973, Pinera helped form The New Cactus Band. The New Cactus Band consisted of Mike Pinera (vocals/guitar), Duane Hitchings (keyboards), Roland Robinson (bass) and Jerry Norris (drums). They recorded the album, Son of Cactus, on Atlantic Records. In 1975, he formed the band Thee Image and they recorded two albums on Manticore Records, Thee Image and Inside the Triangle, both produced by Pinera.

=== Solo career ===
In 1977, Pinera's first solo album, Isla, was released on Capricorn Records. It was followed by Forever in 1979 on Capitol Records. The songs were written and produced by Pinera. The Forever album contained the single "Goodnight My Love," which spent eight weeks on the Billboard Hot 100, peaking at number 70 in February 1980. It was also a hit in Latin America featured in Tele-Novelas Latin TV Series. Pinera joined the Alice Cooper band and he played in the band from the late 1970s to the early 1980s.

In 2012 Mike joined Rockzion and then completed an album called Came To Believe Composed of 7 songs. He worked with Rockzion's players Ronnie Ciago (drums, percussion, vocal BU) and Dennis Renick (keyboards, vocals) and Mike Pinera (guitar, vocals). Mike and Dennis produced the album together. Mike Pinera wrote 3 songs and Dennis Renick wrote 3 songs. The title song "Came To Believe" was a co-write. It was partially released in 2022 with 2 songs as a promo. It was edited for some retracking and final edits. "Down To The Water" was released on September 20, 2022 and still up on YouTube and other outlets. "Came To Believe" was just released on April 5, 2026(Easter). Rockzion Records will be releasing more songs soon. This is the last original work of Mike Pinera before he died on November 20, 2024.

In 2014 Mike began work on the last Blues Image album produced by Michael Franklin. Michael had been a member of Blues Image off and on for 30 years. The album Next Voyage revisits many songs from the Blues Image catalog with new arrangements by Franklin, including an orchestral four-part suite for "Ride Captain Ride," "In A Gadda Da Vida" with horns and many other treatments of Blues Image songs. The Album featured Pat Travers, Jonathan Cain of Journey, Ed Metz on Drums, Tim Franklin on bass, Steady Josph on percussion and Michael Franklin on keys. Other guest included Charlie DeChat of Hall and Oats on Flute and Sax and The B B King Horn Section, choir and Orchestra. It was produced for Solar Music and Release in 2019.

== Personal life and death ==
Pinera was born in Tampa, Florida, on September 29, 1948. He died of liver failure on November 20, 2024, at the age of 76.
