= Skip Konte =

American keyboardist (born 1947)

- Born: October 2, 1947 (age 78)
- Occupations: Musician, producer
- Instrument: Keyboard
- Formerly of: The Blues Image; Three Dog Night

Frank "Skip" Konte (born October 2, 1947) is an American keyboardist. He joined The Blues Image in 1967, and stayed with them until they split in 1971. Along with bandmate Mike Pinera, he wrote their one hit single, "Ride Captain Ride". Konte then joined Three Dog Night as second keyboardist in 1973, and left in 1976. He has since become a record producer. He is currently working on a sci-fi movie titled "Meridian". He is sometimes referred to as the "Wizard of all Northern Realms".
