= Merryweather (band) =

- Genre: Rock
- Years active: 1968–1970s
- Label: Capitol
- Past members: Neil Merryweather

Merryweather was a late 1960s Canadian rock band that relocated to California in the autumn of 1968 and recorded for Capitol Records. The band was led by singer/bass player Neil Merryweather and most of the band subsequently formed Salt 'N' Pepper with Rick James (not to be confused with the later 1980s/1990s band of the same name).

== Early years ==
After leaving Bruce Cockburn's group, The Flying Circus in March 1968, Neil Lillie (born in Winnipeg, Manitoba, on December 27, 1945) reunited with keyboard player Ed Roth (born in Toronto, Ontario, on February 16, 1947) and singer Jimmy Livingstone (born in Toronto, Ontario, on February 28, 1938) to form a new band. They had worked together previously in The Just Us, The Tripp, and Livingstone's Tripp (which Roth and Livingston had renamed Livingstone's Journey following Lillie's departure to join Rick James briefly in the final version of The Mynah Byrds in May 1967).

Adding guitarist David Kindred and drummer Gary Hall, the new group, initially called New King Boiler, began rehearsing in Lillie's grandmother's basement in May 1968. Kindred was quickly replaced by ex-Fraser Loveman Group guitarist Dave Burt (born in Hamilton, Ontario, on September 19, 1948). (Apparently, Gary Hall drank so much coffee that Lillie's grandmother called him "Coffee", and the band started to call him "Coffi".)

== Signing to Capitol Records ==
Renamed Heather Merryweather after a song the band performed whose lyrics were written by a band friend, June Nelson, the group soon shortened it to simply 'Merryweather'. After recording a lone unreleased track "Heather Merryweather" in the autumn, the band drove down to Los Angeles, California, but Livingstone dropped out before the band signed to Capitol Records in the spring of 1968.

Shortly before the release of the band's eponymous debut, produced by John Gross, Lillie changed his surname and became Neil Merryweather. The band's second (double album) was recorded in Los Angeles with the same line-up (Merryweather, Roth, Hall, and Burt) but also featured help from Steve Miller, Barry Goldberg, and Charlie Musselwhite, ex-Traffic guitarist Dave Mason, guitarist Howard Roberts, and violinist Bobby Notkoff. The group was advertised as playing at the Whisky a Go Go in West Hollywood with Mountain on July 29, 1969.

== Rick James ==
Merryweather performed at Thee Experience in Los Angeles on September 21–23, 1969 and appeared at Balboa Stadium in San Diego, California, with Country Joe & The Fish, Poco, Chicago, and Framework on October 12, 1969, after which Burt, followed by Hall and Roth, left to join forces with Rick James in a group called Salt 'N' Pepper.

== Aftermath ==
Neil Merryweather reacted by flying to Toronto to recruit replacements (ex-Ugly Ducklings drummer Robin Boers and guitarist John Richardson from Nucleus–and before that Lords of London), returning to Los Angeles to record an album for the Kent blues label in early 1970. The album was credited to Neil Merryweather, John Richardson, and Boers–for some reason neglecting the presence of ex-49th Parallel member J.J. Velker on organ. It attracted only limited interest, but the group, with the addition of Goldberg, Musselwhite and Merryweather's girlfriend, ex-C.K. Strong singer Lynn Carey, recorded Ivar Avenue Reunion, then (minus Goldberg and Musselwhite) half of Vacuum Cleaner for RCA. The latter was completed with a new lineup featuring guitarist Kal David and a returning Roth and Hall and released as by Merryweather & Carey. The group evolved and recorded four more albums as Mama Lion (with Carey) and as Heavy Cruiser (without her) before falling apart. Neil Merryweather went on to record with a new band called The Space Rangers.

In 1978, after visiting London, Neil Merryweather recorded the album Differences with British musicians including drummer Clive Edwards of Pat Travers and UFO fame.

Gary "Coffi" Hall died suddenly in his home on December 4, 2010. He had been directing Midway Public School's band and choir in Lakota, North Dakota at the time of his passing. His son, Colin, is now an independent artist who goes by his late father's moniker "Coffi".

== Trivia ==
Merryweather and Roth very nearly became the rhythm section in Crosby, Stills, Nash & Young but turned down the offer because Word of Mouth had just been released and they wanted to commit to their band.

== Discography ==
- Merryweather (Capitol SKAO-220) 1969
- Word of Mouth [2LP] (Capitol STBB-278) 1969
- Space Rangers (Mercury SRM-1-1007) 1974
- Kryptonite (Mercury SRM-1-1024) 1975
- Differences (1978)
