= Rhinoceros (Rhinoceros album) =

Studio album by Rhinoceros
- Released: October 1968
- Recorded: Spring 1968
- Genre: Rock
- Length: 36:05
- Label: Elektra
- Producer: Paul A. Rothchild

Rhinoceros chronology
Rhinoceros (1968)	Satin Chickens (1969)

Singles from Better Times Are Coming
- 1. "You're My Girl (I Don't Want To Discuss It)" Released: November 1968; 2. "Apricot Brandy" Released: January 1969; 3. "I Need Love" Released: June 1969

Rhinoceros is the self-titled 1968 debut album of the American rock band Rhinoceros. The fold-out cover artwork by Gene Szafran shows a brightly colourful, beaded rhinoceros and was Grammy nominated for Best Album Cover.

== Track listing ==
1. "When You Say You're Sorry" (Alan Gerber) - 3:51
2. "Same Old Way" (John Finley) - 2:02
3. "Apricot Brandy" - instrumental (Danny Weis, Michael Fonfara) - 1:57
4. "That Time of the Year" (Alan Gerber) - 4:11
5. "You're My Girl (I Don't Want to Discuss It)" (Beth Beatty, Dick Cooper, Ernie Shelby) - 4:38
6. "I Need Love" (Larry Williams) - 4:23
7. "I've Been There" (Alan Gerber, John Finley) - 4:24
8. "Belbuekus" (Danny Weis, John Finley) - 2:25
9. "Along Comes Tomorrow" (Alan Gerber) - 4:37
10. "I Will Serenade You" (John Finley) - 3:19

== Personnel ==
Rhinoceros

- John Finley - vocals (tracks 1,2,4-8,10)
- Alan Gerber - vocals (tracks 1,6-9), piano
- Danny Weis - guitar, piano
- Doug Hastings - guitar
- Michael Fonfara - organ
- Jerry "The Bear" Penrod - bass
- Billy Mundi - drums, percussion

Technical

- John Haeny - engineer
- Gordon Anderson - executive producer
- William S. Harvey - art direction, design concept
- Gene Szafran - cover illustration
- Guy Webster - photography
