= Better Times Are Coming =

Studio album by Rhinoceros
- Released: June 1970
- Studio: A&R Studios, New York City
- Genre: Rock
- Label: Elektra
- Producer: Guy Draper

Rhinoceros chronology
Satin Chickens (1969)	Better Times Are Coming (1970)

Singles from Better Times Are Coming
- 1. "Let's Party" Released: May 1970; 2. "Old Age" Released: July 1970

Better Times Are Coming is the third and final studio album by the American rock supergroup Rhinoceros, released in June 1970 on the Elektra Records label.

== Track listing ==
No.	Title	Writer(s)	Length
1.	"Better Times"	Duke Edwards, Michael Fonfara, John Finley	2:43
2.	"Old Age"	Larry Leishman, Duke Edwards	3:00
3.	"Sweet, Nice 'N' High"	Larry Leishman, Duke Edwards	3:30
4.	"Just Me"	Guy Draper	2:10
5.	"Happiness"	Guy Draper	2:32
6.	"Somewhere"	Danny Weis, John Finley	3:38
7.	"It's a Groovy World"	Guy Draper	2:53
8.	"Insanity"	Guy Draper	2:20
9.	"Lady of Fortune"	Duke Edwards, Larry Leishman	3:02
10.	"Let's Party"	Guy Draper	3:03
11.	"Rain Child"	Larry Leishman, Duke Edwards	5:26

== Singles ==
The first single was "Let's Party" written by Guy Draper. The B-side, "Old Age", was written by drummer Duke Edwards with Larry Leishman.

== Personnel ==
Rhinoceros

- John Finley – vocals
- Danny Weis, Larry Leishman – guitar
- Peter Hodgson – bass
- Michael Fonfara – organ
- Duke Edwards – drums, vocals

with:

- The Rhinets – vocals on "Let's Party"

Technical

- Dennis R. Murphy, Guy Draper – mixing
- Roy Cicala, Shelly Yakus – engineers and special effects
- Joel Brodsky – photography

== Reception ==
In a review of the album from 1970, Billboard Magazine said the "instrumentals are tight and gutsy, and the message is strictly positive with the sway of soul." Other reviews were less complimentary.
