= Newport Pop Festival =

Southern California music festivals in 1968 and 1969

Coordinates: 37.91258°N 122.60844°W

The Newport Pop Festival
- Poster for the 1968 event
- Genre: Rock, pop, etc.
- Dates: August 3–4, 1968; June 20–22, 1969
- Locations: Costa Mesa, California (1968); Northridge, California (1969)
- Years active: 1968-1969
- Attendance: 100,000 (1968); 200,000 (1969)

The Newport Pop Festival was a rock festival held in Costa Mesa, California, on August 3–4, 1968. It was the first music concert ever to have more than 100,000 paid attendees. Its sequel, billed as Newport 69, was held in Northridge, California, on June 20–22, 1969, and had a total attendance estimated at 200,000.

Hundreds of people were injured in rioting outside Newport ’69. Due to $50,000 in damages done to neighborhood homes and businesses, an investigation was launched by the Los Angeles police commission. Outside the festival, teenagers threw bottles and rocks, and damaged property. An estimated 300 people were injured, some as young as 14. Fifteen police officials were injured, and about 75 rioters were arrested.

== History ==
There were two separate events staged in the late 1960s that are commonly referred to as the "Newport Pop Festival." The first was called the Newport Pop Festival — no relation to the folk or jazz festivals in Rhode Island — and was held at the Orange County Fairgrounds in Costa Mesa, California, on the weekend of August 3–4, 1968. The second event was originally billed as "Newport 69," and was held over the three-day weekend of June 20–22, 1969 in Northridge, California, at Devonshire Downs. In published writings over the last 40 years, this latter event has been referred to as the "Newport 69 Pop Festival," the "Newport Pop Festival 1969" or simply the "Newport Pop Festival." Subsequently, much confusion has been created over the years between the 1968 and 1969 events. Some of this confusion was generated by the participating musicians themselves who, in later interviews, often mixed up the two events.

Mark Robinson (age 24), Gary R. Schmidt (age 26), and his father Al Schmidt. produced the 1968 festival. Al was not a rock 'n' roller, but rather an entrepreneurial businessman who helped with the money and licensing. There was a brief lawsuit over trade names between the two Schmidts and Robinson just prior to the "Newport 69" show, which the Schmidts had declined to be involved in because of the cost of the acts and Robinson produced alone. The entire band budget for the '68 show had been under $50,000, while Robinson paid Jimi Hendrix alone $100,000 for the '69 event. This was an amount of money unheard of at that time for a rock act. Robinson reportedly spent $282,000 for all the '69 acts. The trade name lawsuit arose within the last few days before the '69 show; the court ordered that Robinson had to use "not affiliated with the Newport Pop Festival" disclaimers in advertising. Otherwise, he would not have been able to stage a "Newport 70" show using that name.

A round flyer with the dimensions of a 45 rpm record was used to promote the 1968 Costa Mesa show and is included in "The Art of Rock," a publication of 1960s and 1970s poster art. This flyer has sold on eBay for as much as $500.

== The Newport Pop Festival 1968 ==
The first Newport Pop Festival was held at the Orange County Fairgrounds in Costa Mesa, California, on the weekend of August 3–4, 1968. It is believed to have been the first pop music concert with over 100,000 paid attendees.

The 1968 event was originally scheduled to be held inside the Orange County Fairgrounds in an outdoor pavilion. The fairgrounds are on Newport Boulevard, just a short distance from Newport Beach (hence the concert name). The 1968 event's advance ticket sales were triple of what was expected, and it became evident that no area inside the fairgrounds could hold even 25,000 people, let alone the near 100,000 then predicted. In the last three days before the show it was moved to one of the adjoining parking lots of the fairgrounds. Fencing, staging, sanitation, and food concessions had to be organized within just three days. Fencing in some areas consisted of wire blankets and/or tarps deployed as visual blocks. People without tickets on the outside would "storm the fence" and get in for free. None of the commercial concessionaires were prepared for the event, and ran out of food and drink halfway through the first day. Water was provided throughout the event by garden hoses from inside the fairgrounds, but attendees had to provide their own containers and give up their viewing spot to reach the water. A broken water supply pipe provided a mud bath that a number of people jumped in, but people realized that the sun would bake the mud hard and stopped. Sanitary facilities were in the rear of the grounds. The weather was a typical August day in Southern California, and there was no shade in the primary viewing area; many in attendance were sunburned. Those without hotel reservations had no place to stay. However, city officials alleviated some of the problems by designating a 32-acre (130,000 m^{2}) area of the fairgrounds as an emergency campsite. They also brought in portable toilets and water tanks. The event displayed some of the key problems rock festival promoters would face in the future.

Harvey "Humble Harve" Miller, a Top 40 disc jockey for 93 KHJ-AM in Los Angeles, was hired to promote the show and hosted the event with Wavy Gravy. Wesco Productions (West Coast Productions) consisted of Mark Robinson, Gary Schmidt and Al Schmidt, though Humble Harv was used in advertising for promotional purposes. Tom Neito of Scenic Sounds Productions also assisted in securing the fairgrounds, and was paid a fee and received some promotional billing. Robinson had been involved with Bob Blodget in staging a much smaller but similar weekend festival in 1967 in Los Angeles. There never was a second edition of this event and its prominence faded from memory until, on August 4, 2008, Jeff Overley penned a feature article for the Orange County Register that commemorated the event's 40th anniversary.

The big hits with the crowd included Tiny Tim, Jefferson Airplane, Country Joe McDonald, The Chambers Brothers, and Steppenwolf.

Mark Robinson went on to promote a similar "Newport 69" show with Jimi Hendrix and later became an attorney, practicing law with Melvin Belli. Al and Gary teamed up with Bill Quarry, Alfie Zaner and Rich Romello and produced the San Francisco International Pop Festival at the Alameda County Fairgrounds in Pleasanton on October 25–26, 1968. That show drew over 40,000 people and featured Creedence Clearwater Revival, the Chambers Brothers, José Feliciano, Deep Purple, Procol Harum, Johnny Rivers, Iron Butterfly, Eric Burdon and the Animals, Canned Heat, The Grass Roots, Rejoice, and Fraternity of Man. After the show, Al Schmidt continued in non rock 'n' roll business until he died at 83 in the late 1990s. Gary Schmidt entered the nightclub business and continued to promote smaller events throughout Northern California, including two more festivals with attendance in the 25,000–30,000 range: The Labor Day Weekend Music and Arts Festival in Carson City, Nevada in 1972 and Super Sun Bust Summer of 1973 at the Eugene Speedway (Oregon). For some of these productions, Schmidt teamed up with Bill Quarry, a well known early East Bay promoter (see "Teens N Twenties" and "The East Bay Scene, Garage Bands from the '60s, Then and Now"). Schmidt also operated a well-known rock nightclub, the Odyssey Room, in Sunnyvale, California, from 1969 to 1989 (see Odyssey Room Revisited) and a venue just outside Reno, Nevada on Mt. Rose called the Reindeer Lodge which, as of 2010, still hosts occasional shows. Mark Robinson, at the time a Stanford student, promoted a few more concerts and then finished law school. He is now a nationally renowned and accredited attorney, practicing law throughout the United States while keeping a home office in Orange County.

The 1968 event attracted much media attention at the time. Rolling Stone Magazine published an article on the event in its September 14, 1968, edition, writing:

Newport Pop Festival Drags on in Dust and Heat: Dead, Country Joe, Crosby, pie fight weekend's highlights

An estimated 140,000 attended the first and probably the last Newport Pop Festival in California's Orange County Aug. 3-4, viewing, among others, Tiny Tim, Jefferson Airplane, Country Joe and the Fish, Grateful Dead, Chambers Brothers, Charles Lloyd, James Cotton Blues Band, Quicksilver Messenger Service, and the Byrds.

Although not listed, Eric Burdon introduced a local Long Beach, CA band WAR.

The festival was regarded musically successful but on other fronts rather less than pleasing. The performers appeared on a raised stage under a striped canopy, but the young crowds were left sitting or standing in a huge, flat, dusty-dry open field under a broiling sun. Refreshment and rest room facilities were less than adequate and the sound system was not powerful enough to carry the sound to everyone present.

The highlight of the pop fest on the first day (Saturday) seemed to come when Country Joe closed the bill. The hour was late and Orange County officials were threatening to shut off the electricity when the band went on, finally relenting to give the band time for two songs. As they began their first, "1, 2, 3, 4, What Are We Fighting For," the approximately 40,000 young people still on hand rose as if one, cheering, hands held aloft in the "peace sign." During the second number, a long blues, even the cops on stage were grinning and adlibbing a moderate version of the boogaloo.

The second day's climax came when David Crosby started a planned pie fight with Jefferson Airplane. In all, 250 cream pies flew back and forth ... and the thousands of people present stormed the stage to join in.

The musical line-up was an impressive one. Besides those already mentioned, bands appearing were Alice Cooper, Steppenwolf, Sonny and Cher, Canned Heat, Electric Flag, Butterfield Blues Band, Eric Burdon and the Animals, Blue Cheer, Iron Butterfly, Illinois Speed Press and Things to Come.

But admission to the festival was $5.50 per day – to sit in heat and dust. Most considered it another in the series of pop music shucks.

The Newport Pop Festival – which wasn't even held in Newport, but in Costa Mesa – was produced by Humble Harvey Miller, one of L.A.'s Top-40 DJs, and Wesco Associates, basically the same coalition that staged a similarly uncomfortable weekend festival last summer in another Los Angeles dust bin.

Among other highlights that concert-goers recall were when helicopters flew overhead, dropping flowers on the audience. And on Sunday, Sonny and Cher arrived by helicopter and were later booed off the stage.

Bands performing at the Festival:

Saturday, August 3, 1968

Alice Cooper, Canned Heat, The Chambers Brothers, the Charles Lloyd Quartet, Country Joe and the Fish, The Electric Flag, James Cotton Blues Band, Paul Butterfield Blues Band, Sonny & Cher, Blue Cheer, Steppenwolf, Tiny Tim, Illinois Speed Press, Iron Butterfly.

During the Charles Lloyd Quartet set, a local group called Super Chief began playing a Lee Michaels song, "Hello," on an alternate stage at the rear of the crowd. Most of the attendees turned around and watched them, as the Lloyd music was not in a popular style.

Sunday, August 4, 1968

Eric Burdon & the Animals, Grateful Dead, Jefferson Airplane, Quicksilver Messenger Service, Country Joe & the Fish, The Byrds, Things to Come.

Bands that were rumored to have performed at the festival, but didn't

Lovin' Spoonful, Rhinoceros, Sky Pilot and The Turtles were not listed on the official poster for the event.

The 1969 festival was intended to be the successor to the Orange County event, hoping to capitalize on the brand name and market momentum generated in 1968. A move of venue was necessary because the 1968 event had fallen in disfavor with local community leaders. Three days after the 1968 event, the Costa Mesa City Council vowed to prevent a Newport Pop Festival encore. "To say that we would not like it back here would be the understatement of the year," said Costa Mesa Mayor Alvin Pinkley.

== The "Newport 69" Festival ==
Newport 69
- Genre: Rock, pop, etc.
- Dates: June 20–22, 1969
- Location: Northridge, California (1969)
- Attendance: 200,000 (1969)

Attended by an estimated 200,000 fans on June 20–22, 1969, this festival was the largest pop concert up to that time and is considered the more famous of the two Newport Pop Festivals, possibly because of the appearance of the top-billed Jimi Hendrix Experience. Mark Robinson and friends, like Allan Cooper (song writer), Frank Hope and Associates (Architects) Wil Crossman (entertainer) to name a few, reportedly spent around $600,000 for the festival, grossed over $750,000, but because of the violence, he claimed to have lost $150,000.

The venue, Devonshire Downs, formerly a racetrack and multi-purpose event and entertainment facility, is now part of the North Campus of California State University at Northridge.

Friday, June 20, 1969

Ike & Tina Turner, Albert King, Edwin Hawkins Singers, The Jimi Hendrix Experience, Joe Cocker, Southwind, Spirit, Don Ellis Orchestra, Taj Mahal, and Jerry Lauderdale.

Saturday, June 21, 1969

Albert Collins, Brenton Wood, Buffy Sainte-Marie, Charity, Creedence Clearwater Revival, Eric Burdon and War, Friends of Distinction, Jethro Tull, Lee Michaels, Love, Steppenwolf and Sweetwater.

Sunday, June 22, 1969

Booker T. & the M.G.'s, The Chambers Brothers, The Flock, The Grass Roots, Johnny Winter, Mother Earth, Jimi Hendrix jam with Buddy Miles, Eric Burdon and Mother Earth, Poco, The Byrds, The Rascals and Three Dog Night. Marvin Gaye's appearance was cancelled because he missed his plane.

=== Controversy ===
Hundreds of people were injured in rioting outside Newport ’69. Due to $50,000 in damages done to neighborhood homes and businesses, an investigation was launched by the Los Angeles police commission. Admission cost was $6 a day in advance, $7 at the gate, $15 in advance for the three days. Gatecrashers breached hurricane fencing. Outside the festival, teenagers threw bottles and rocks, and damaged property. An estimated 300 were injured, some as young as 14. Fifteen police officials were injured, and about 75 rioters were arrested. Traffic to and from Devonshire Downs was nearly impassible and parking was limited, so thousands parked in residential neighborhoods. People traveling to the concert on Sunday found no public restrooms in the area open to them due to trashing done in the previous 2 days.

== See also ==
- List of historic rock festivals
- List of pop festivals
- List of music festivals in the United States
