= Stan Endersby =

Canadian singer-songwriter and guitarist

- Born: July 17, 1947 (age 78); Lachine, Quebec, Canada
- Occupations: Singer-songwriter, guitarist
- Years active: 1960s–1970s

Stan Endersby (born July 17, 1947, in Lachine, Quebec) is a Canadian singer-songwriter and guitarist.

He comes from an acting family and began his career in the early 1960s playing with Toronto bands, The Omegas and C J Feeney & The Spellbinders.

During late 1965, he joined The Just Us alongside singers Jimmy Livingston (ex-Mynah Birds) and Neil Lillie aka Neil Merryweather, bass player Wayne Davis, keyboard player Ed Roth and drummer Bob Ablack. The group recorded an album but the tapes went missing with the band's manager.

Endersby remained with the band as it evolved through The Tripp and Livingstone's Journey but left for England in March 1968, where he met Kinks bass player Peter Quaife who invited him to form a new group. The promised band, however, never materialised and later that year he returned to Toronto to produce the music for Jim Henson's television show The Cube.

After a brief stint playing with Transfusion (the house band at Toronto's Rock Pile where they opened for Frank Zappa's Mothers of Invention as Crazy Horse – no relation to Neil Young's group), he received a call from Quaife asking him to return to England and put together the promised band, Mapleoak.

Mapleoak initially comprised English drummer Mick Cook and Canadian keyboard player Marty Fisher who had played with Endersby on The Cube. The band did a tour of Denmark after which Cook was replaced by another Canadian, Gordon MacBain, who had also played on The Cube. The new line up recorded a single for Decca records – "Son of a Gun" c/w "Hurt Me So Much" but Quaife left soon afterwards and the remaining trio recorded an LP before returning to Toronto in late 1970.

Back home, Endersby formed Heaven and Earth with his former Just Us/Tripp/Livingston Journey cohort Ed Roth. The band also comprised ex-The Paupers bass player Denny Gerrard, drummer Pat Little from Luke & The Apostles and Chimo!, guitarist Gary Holmes and future Motown star, singer Rick James. The group issued two singles for RCA in 1971.
