= Cyan (Three Dog Night album) =

1973 studio album by Three Dog Night

Studio album by Three Dog Night
- Released: October 9, 1973
- Studios: American Recording Co., Studio City, California
- Genres: Pop, rock
- Length: 34:49
- Label: Dunhill
- Producer: Richard Podolor

Three Dog Night chronology
Around the World With Three Dog Night (1973)	Cyan (1973)	Hard Labor (1974)

Singles from Cyan
- 1. "Shambala" Released: May 11, 1973; 2. "Let Me Serenade You" Released: November 3, 1973

Professional ratings
Review scores
Source	Rating
AllMusic	3/5 stars
Rolling Stone	(not rated)

Cyan is the seventh studio album by American rock band Three Dog Night, released on October 9, 1973, by Dunhill Records. The album's original title was Seven Ball, Center Pocket, which was changed for unknown reasons.

== Track listing ==
=== Side 1 ===
1. "Happy Song" (Mike Allsup) – 3:37
2. "Play Children Play" (Kent Sprague, Gary Stovall) – 4:10
3. "Storybook Feeling" (Allsup) – 4:20
4. "Ridin' Thumb" (Jim Seals, Dash Crofts) – 4:09

=== Side 2 ===
1. "Shambala" (Daniel Moore) – 3:23
2. "Singer Man" (Cebert Bernard, Derrick Harriott) – 3:28
3. "Let Me Serenade You" (John Finley) – 3:15
4. "Lay Me Down Easy" (Moore) – 3:54
5. "Into My Life" (Allsup) – 4:33

== Personnel ==
=== Three Dog Night ===
- Mike Allsup – guitar
- Jimmy Greenspoon – keyboard
- Danny Hutton – lead vocals (B4), background vocals
- Chuck Negron – lead vocals (A1, A3, B2, B5), background vocals
- Jack Ryland – bass
- Floyd Sneed – drums
- Cory Wells – lead vocals (tracks A2, A4, B1, B3), background vocals

=== Additional personnel ===
- Donna Gaines – additional background vocals
- Gordon DeWitty – organ (track B3)

=== Production ===
- Producer: Richard Podolor
- Engineer: Bill Cooper
- Arranger: Richard Podolor, Three Dog Night
- Art direction: Ed Caraeff
- Design: David Larkham, Michael Ross
- Photography: Ed Caraeff

== Charts ==
Album – Billboard (United States)

Year	Chart	Position
1973	Japan Oricon	56
1973	US Top 200	26
1973	Canada	8

Singles – Billboard (United States) unless otherwise noted

Year	Single	Chart	Position
1973	"Shambala"	US Adult Contemporary	3
1973	"Shambala"	US Pop Singles	3
1973	"Shambala"	US Cash Box Singles	1
1973	"Let Me Serenade You"	US Pop Singles	17

== Certifications ==
Region	Certification	Certified units/sales
United States (RIAA)	Gold	500,000^{^}
^{^} Shipments figures based on certification alone.
