= Better Times =

Better Times may refer to:

- Krøniken (English: Better Times), a Danish television drama
- Better Times (film), a 1919 silent drama film directed by King Vidor
- Better Times (album), a 1992 album by Black Sorrows.
- "Better Times", a song by Beach House from Teen Dream, 2010
- "Better Times", a song by Rhinoceros from Better Times Are Coming, 1970
- "Better Times", a song by Låpsley and KC Lights, 2023
