= Rhinoceros (band) =

American rock band

- Origin: Los Angeles, California, United States
- Genres: Rock
- Years active: 1967–1970, 2009
- Past members: John Finley; Michael Fonfara; Danny Weis; Doug Hastings; Alan Gerber; Jerry "The Bear" Penrod; John Keleihor; Billy Mundi; Peter Hodgson; Duke Edwards; Larry Leishman; Bernie LaBarge; Mike Sloski
- Website: www.rhinoceros-group.com (Tribute Site)

Rhinoceros was an American rock band established in 1967 through auditions conducted by Elektra Records, rather than organic formation by musicians. The band, while well respected in many circles, did not live up to the record label's expectations. It was also poorly received by fans, producing a slow-selling debut album and two even less successful LPs before breaking up. One reviewer commented, "Despite the fact that the band could not live up to the expectations that were raised by Elektra Records' publicity machine, Rhinoceros' contributions to rock still deserve more credit than subsequent rock histories give it."

== Formation ==
Paul A. Rothchild, then Elektra Records' talent scout and house producer, and fellow producer Frazier Mohawk (formerly Barry Friedman), decided to individually sign talented young musicians and form them together into a group in this fashion. While Mohawk had been instrumental in coordinating band membership for what became Buffalo Springfield (encouraging Stills to form Buffalo Springfield following his Monkees audition), the establishment of what became Rhinoceros involved a more formal third-party role.

Rothchild and Mohawk initially invited twelve musicians to audition in September 1967, at Mohawk's house in Laurel Canyon. Included in this group were Doug Hastings (guitar) and Alan Gerber (keyboards and vocals). A second audition was held at a Los Angeles motel in November 1967, where approximately twenty musicians were reviewed. After this meeting, John Finley (vocals) and Danny Weis (guitar) were chosen to work with Hastings and Gerber. Finley and Hodgson were both former members of Jon and Lee & the Checkmates, a band which Rothchild had expressed an interest in signing as early as 1965 that had broken up in September 1967.

Weis had been an original member of Iron Butterfly and played on their debut album. Hastings had been a member of Seattle's The Daily Flash, and briefly served as Neil Young's replacement in Buffalo Springfield, during one of Young's departures from the group. Other members of the Daily Flash were invited to audition for Rhinoceros, though only Hastings was chosen.

Weis then suggested former Iron Butterfly bandmate Jerry Penrod as the bass player for Rhinoceros; his suggestion was accepted. Former Checkmate keyboard player Michael Fonfara was then invited to join the lineup. Fonfara had joined The Electric Flag in mid-November 1967, for sessions and a brief tour of the northeast U.S. and California. During mid-December, he ran into Finley and Hodgson at the Tropicana Motel in Los Angeles, and was encouraged by Finley to sign on to the Rhinoceros project. Based on Finley's recommendation, Fonfara was brought into Rhinoceros, following the completion of his obligations to the Electric Flag. John Keleihor, former drummer for The Daily Flash, contributed to some of the group's initial recordings, but departed early on. The final member chosen, in early 1968, was Billy Mundi, former drummer for the Mothers of Invention.

== Career ==
The band first recorded together as the backing musicians for David Ackles' debut album, released in 1968. Rhinoceros' self-titled debut album, produced by Paul Rothchild, was also released in 1968. Despite heavy promotion and critical acclaim it did not sell well. However, the instrumental "Apricot Brandy", written by Weis and Fonfara, reached No. 46 on the Billboard Charts and was later used as a signature tune by BBC radio, and covered by Danny Gatton for the 1990 compilation Rubáiyát. Another of the album's songs, "I Will Serenade You", written by John Finley, was covered by Three Dog Night as "Let Me Serenade You" and went to No. 17 in the US in 1973. In addition, their cover of "You're My Girl (I Don't Want To Discuss It)" was covered in 1969 by Amen Corner on their National Welsh Coast Live Explosion Company album, and in 1970 by Rod Stewart, on his Gasoline Alley album. "I Will Serenade You" was the debut single of Rhinoceros in the United States, while "You're My Girl" was the debut single in the United Kingdom, both being released in 1968. Both songs were released on the same single, with each song being the B-side of the other, depending on the country of release.

The next two years saw many changes of the lineup and two more albums. From the time of their second album, Satin Chickens (1969), Rothchild and Mohawk were no longer involved with production. The album was instead produced by David Anderle. Bassist Jerry Penrod abruptly departed from the band after the album's completion; he was briefly replaced by Danny Weis' brother, Steve, and later by Finley's cousin and former bandmate in Jon and Lee & The Checkmates Peter Hodgson. Hodgson had lost out to Jerry Penrod in the initial auditions and had then joined David Clayton-Thomas in Toronto for his David Clayton-Thomas Combine. He later returned to Los Angeles to work with Jackson Browne before finally joining Rhinoceros in April 1969. Three more band members would leave before the recording of the third album: first was guitarist Doug Hastings, who left that summer to be replaced by another Checkmate, Larry Leishman, who had played with Freedom Fair and The Power Project until mid-1968 and then with Bobby Kris & The Imperials. A bit later Alan Gerber left the band due to disagreements over band manager Billy Fields' decision to not have them perform at Woodstock; Billy Mundi would follow him shortly after. The two roles of singer and drummer were taken up by The Checkmates' manager/drummer Duke Edwards, who had also played with Rhinoceros newcomer Leishman in The Duke Edwards Cycle in early 1969.

The lineup of John Finley (vocals), Danny Weis (guitars), Michael Fonfara (organ), Peter Hodgson (bass), Larry Leishman (guitars) and Duke Edwards (drums, vocals) moved to New York and recorded the third and last Rhinoceros album, Better Times Are Coming, in 1970. The band performed some shows at Fillmore East, after which Edwards was replaced by Dr. John drummer Richard Crooks, who in turn would be replaced by Malcolm Tomlinson, who stayed with the band until their dissolution, before mid-1971.

== Blackstone ==
In 1971, after the breakup of Rhinoceros, John Finley, Michael Fonfara, Peter Hodgson, Danny Weis and Larry Leishman formed a new group called Blackstone, later referred to by Weis as "an attempt to re-capture some of the fun we had in Rhinoceros". They recorded an album for Canadian label GRT, titled On the Line (1973), produced by Paul Rothchild. The musicians then went their separate ways.

== Personnel ==
=== Members ===
- John Finley – vocals (1967–1971, 2009)
- Michael Fonfara – organ, piano (1967–1971, 2009)
- Danny Weis – guitar, piano (1967–1971, 2009)
- Doug Hastings – guitar (1967–1970)
- Alan Gerber – vocals, piano (1967–1969, 2009)
- Jerry "The Bear" Penrod – bass (1967–1969)
- John Keleihor – drums (1967–1968)
- Billy Mundi – drums (1968–1969)
- Steve Weis – bass (1969)
- Peter Hodgson – bass (1969–1971, 2009)
- Larry Leishman – guitar (1969–1971)
- Duke Edwards – drums, vocals (1969–1970)
- Richard Crooks – drums (1970)
- Malcolm Tomlinson – drums (1970–1971)
- Bernie LaBarge – guitar (2009)
- Mike Sloski – drums (2009)

=== Lineups ===
1967 – 1968	1968 – Early 1969	Early 1969 – April 1969	April 1969 – Mid 1969
John Finley – vocals; Alan Gerber – vocals, piano; Danny Weis – guitar, piano; Doug Hastings – guitar; Michael Fonfara – organ, piano; Jerry "The Bear" Penrod – bass; John Keleihor – drums	John Finley – vocals; Alan Gerber – vocals, piano; Danny Weis – guitar, piano; Doug Hastings – guitar; Michael Fonfara – organ, piano; Jerry "The Bear" Penrod – bass; Billy Mundi – drums	John Finley – vocals; Alan Gerber – vocals, piano; Danny Weis – guitar; Doug Hastings – guitar; Michael Fonfara – organ, piano; Billy Mundi – drums; Steve Weis – bass	John Finley – vocals; Alan Gerber – vocals, piano; Danny Weis – guitar; Doug Hastings – guitar; Michael Fonfara – organ, piano; Billy Mundi – drums; Peter Hodgson – bass
Mid 1969	1969	1969 – 1970	1970
John Finley – vocals; Alan Gerber – vocals, piano; Danny Weis – guitar; Michael Fonfara – organ, piano; Billy Mundi – drums; Peter Hodgson – bass; Larry Leishman – guitar	John Finley – vocals; Danny Weis – guitar; Michael Fonfara – organ, piano; Billy Mundi – drums; Peter Hodgson – bass; Larry Leishman – guitar	John Finley – vocals; Danny Weis – guitar; Michael Fonfara – organ; Peter Hodgson – bass; Larry Leishman – guitar; Duke Edwards – drums, vocals	John Finley – vocals; Danny Weis – guitar; Michael Fonfara – organ; Peter Hodgson – bass; Larry Leishman – guitar; Richard Crooks – drums
1970 – 1971	1971 – 2009	2009
John Finley – vocals; Danny Weis – guitar; Michael Fonfara – organ; Peter Hodgson – bass; Larry Leishman – guitar; Malcolm Tomlinson – drums	Disbanded	John Finley – vocals; Danny Weis – guitar; Michael Fonfara – organ; Alan Gerber – vocals, piano; Peter Hodgson – bass; Bernie LaBarge – guitar; Mike Sloski – drums

== Albums ==
- Rhinoceros (1968)
- Satin Chickens (1969)
- Better Times Are Coming (1970)

== Singles ==
- 1968: “You're My Girl" / "I Will Serenade You”
- 1969: “Apricot Brandy" / "When You Say You're Sorry”
- 1969: “I Need Love" / "Belbuekus”
- 1969: “Back Door" / "In a Little Room”
- 1970: “Old Age" / "Let's Party”
- 1970: “Better Times" / "It's a Groovy World”
