= The Flying Circus (Canada) =

Defunct Canadian folk rock band

- Origin: Canada
- Years active: 1967–1968
- Past members: Bruce Cockburn; Neil Merryweather; Marty Fisher; Gordon MacBain

The Flying Circus were a short-lived Toronto-based group fronted by singer/songwriter, Bruce Cockburn. The band, which was active between late 1967 and early 1968, also featured Neil Merryweather and future Mapleoak members, Marty Fisher and Gordon MacBain.

== The Mynah Birds ==
After leaving The Mynah Birds (sometimes spelt Myna Byrds) in early September 1967, Neil Lillie (later better known as Neil Merryweather) was introduced to ex-Esquires member Bruce Cockburn through The Five Man Electrical Band. The pair decided to launch a new group and recruited former Bobby Kris & The Imperials members Martin Fisher and Gordon MacBain who were playing at the Concorde Tavern in Toronto at the time.

Signed to Harvey Glatt’s management, The Flying Circus recorded a number of unreleased tracks in Toronto during late 1967, including Cockburn’s “Flying Circus”, “She Wants To Know”, “I’m Leaving You Out” and “Mother” as well as Lillie’s “Last Hoorah” and “Elephant Song” and Fisher and MacBain’s “Where Is All The Love”. During the same sessions, the band also recorded songs by Cockburn’s former The Children cohort, William Hawkins, such as “Merry Go Round”, “It’s A Dirty Shame” and “Little Bit Stoned”.

Around this time, the group also recorded a few tracks with another former Children member Sandy Crawley, which were never released.

On October 1, the band began a residence at Le Hibou in Ottawa. The following month, from November 14–18, 1967, The Flying Circus played at the Riverboat in Toronto. Over the next few months, the group also opened for Wilson Pickett and Roy Orbison at the Capitol Theatre in Ottawa.

== The Flying Circus becomes Olivus ==
In early March 1968, Lillie left to form Heather Merryweather and was replaced by former Livingstone’s Journey member Dennis Pendrith. The group’s road manager, Michael Ferry (Lee Jackson of Jon and Lee & The Checkmates) suggested that the group should change name to Olivus.
