= David Ackles (album) =

Studio album by David Ackles
- Released: June, 1968
- Genre: Singer-songwriter
- Length: 36:51
- Label: Elektra
- Producer: David Anderle, Russ Miller

David Ackles chronology
David Ackles (1968)	Subway to the Country (1970)

David Ackles is the self-titled debut album of American singer-songwriter David Ackles. Elektra Records later reissued it with new cover art under the title The Road to Cairo.

Julie Driscoll, Brian Auger and the Trinity covered "The Road to Cairo" shortly after the album's release. In the early-1970s, Spooky Tooth and the Hollies would cover "Down River."

== Reception ==
Professional ratings
Review scores
Source	Rating
AllMusic	4/5 stars
The Encyclopedia of Popular Music	4/5 stars

Described by music historian Richie Unterberger as Ackles' "most rock-oriented record", it garnered faint praise from Rolling Stone critic Arthur Schmidt, who complained of thin melodies but who nevertheless described Ackles as "one of the best singers I've ever heard".

Cashbox said upon hearing the album, "we can feel its thought, for the music too is a translation of ideas into more human and perhaps more natural forms" and that "musical motion become musical emotion ... his music, for all its intrinsic complexities, feels as though it were not made, but simply happened: his chord, his rhythms, his melodies breathe".

Music critic Pete Johnson wrote that "his singing and writing talents create a beautiful LP, 10 songs whose quality never falters", and also noted that "much of the album is gloomy, songs of evaporated love, the fearful lure of a nonexistent home, a painful meeting between one-time lovers and the loss of faith, but he breaks the dark spell with a couple of optimistic numbers".

== Track listing ==
All songs composed by David Ackles.

1. "The Road to Cairo" – 5:16
2. "When Love Is Gone" – 3:20
3. "Sonny Come Home" – 2:59
4. "Blue Ribbons" – 4:37
5. "What a Happy Day" – 2:14
6. "Down River" – 3:57
7. "Laissez-Faire" – 1:36
8. "Lotus Man" – 2:49
9. "His Name Is Andrew" – 6:11
10. "Be My Friend" – 4:48

== Personnel ==
- David Ackles – piano, vocals
- Danny Weis – guitar
- Douglas Hastings – guitar
- Jerry Penrod – bass guitar
- Michael Fonfara – organ
- Jon Keliehor – percussion

Technical

- Bruce Botnick, Brain Ross-Myring – engineer
- Bob Fisher – audio mastering
- Joel Brodsky – photography
- William S. Harvey – art direction, cover art concept, cover art
- Richie Unterberger – liner notes
