= Shambala (song) =

1973 single by B. W. Stevenson

- Side A of the original US single

Single by B. W. Stevenson

from the album My Maria
- B-side: "My Feet Are So Weary"
- Released: April 1973
- Genre: Country rock
- Length: 2:28
- Label: RCA Victor
- Songwriter: Daniel Moore
- Producer: David Kershenbaum

B. W. Stevenson singles chronology
"Don't Go To Mexico" (1973)	"Shambala" (1973)	"My Maria" (1973)

Audio
- "Shambala" on YouTube

"Shambala"

Single by Three Dog Night

from the album Cyan
- B-side: "Our 'B' Side"
- Released: May 11, 1973
- Studio: American Recording Co., Studio City, Los Angeles
- Genre: Pop; gospel; rock
- Length: 3:25
- Label: Dunhill
- Songwriter: Daniel Moore
- Producer: Richard Podolor

Three Dog Night singles chronology
"Pieces of April" (1972)	"Shambala" (1973)	"Let Me Serenade You" (1973)

Audio
- "Shambala" on YouTube

"Shambala" is a song written by Daniel Moore and made famous by two near-simultaneous releases in 1973: the better-known but slightly later recording by Three Dog Night, which reached No. 3 on the Billboard Hot 100, and a version by B. W. Stevenson. Its title derives from a mythical place-name also spelled Shamballa or Shambhala.

== Lyrics ==
The song's actual lyrics are about the mythical kingdom of Shambhala, which was said to be hidden somewhere within or beyond the peaks of the Himalayas and was mentioned in various ancient texts, including the Kalachakra Tantra and ancient texts of Tibetan Buddhism. The original location was a mystic temple in Peru, specifically, the temple of the White Lodge, according to Alice Bailey's A Treatise on White Magic (1934), cited by Moore.

The lyrics refer to a situation where kindness and cooperation are universal, joy and good fortune abound, and psychological burdens are lifted. The phrases "in the halls of Shambala" and "on the road to Shambala" tie for number of occurrences in the lyrics. The latter phrase perhaps alludes to the idea of Shambala not as a physical place but as a metaphor for the spiritual path one might follow.

== Three Dog Night version ==
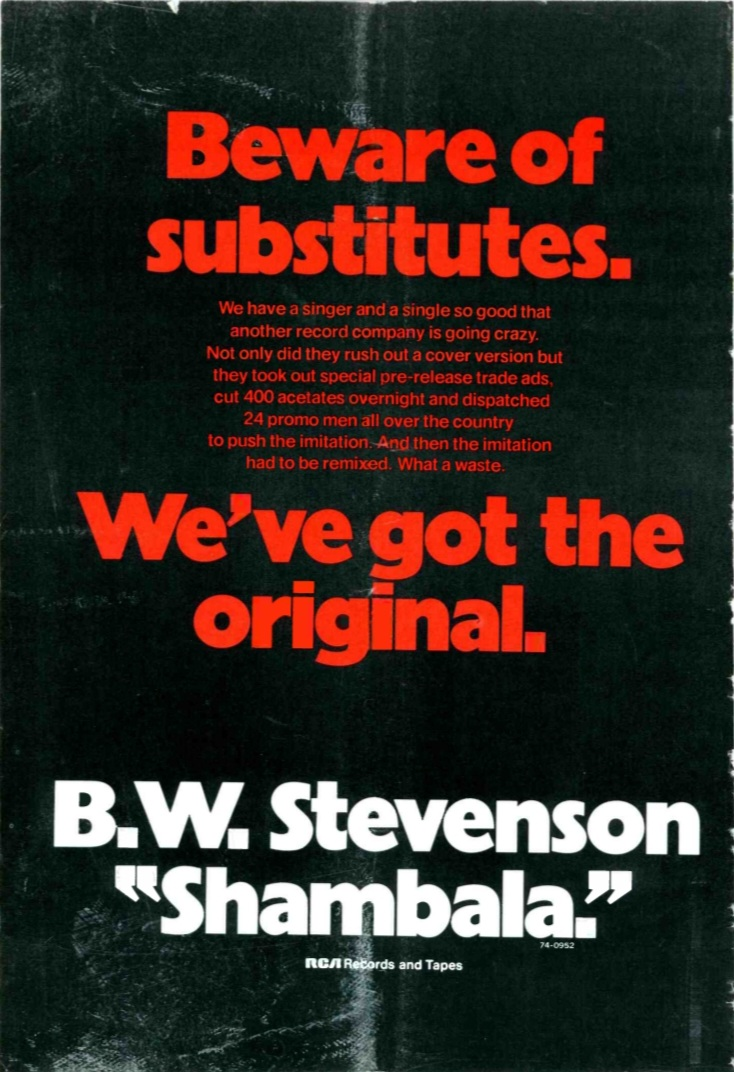
1973 trade ad for Stevenson's version, mocking the creative process of the Three Dog Night version

The well-known cover version of this song by the rock band Three Dog Night appeared in 1973 on the Billboard Hot 100, on the top 40 from the beginning of June through the end of August. It reached No. 3 in both the pop singles and adult contemporary categories, No. 1 on the Cashbox charts, and also spent a week at No. 1 on popular Top 40 stations WABC New York and WLS Chicago. The song, the first one that the group had specifically cut as a single, rather than as part of an album project, later appeared on Cyan, Three Dog Night's ninth album, and subsequently on numerous anthologies and compilation albums.

Although the lyrics of "Shambala" draw on a theme from Eastern mysticism, AllMusic notes the "very strong gospel feeling" of the album Cyan is most evident on this song. Allmusic calls this hit single "one of the group's finest later period records."

In the original recording, writer Daniel Moore pronounces the first syllable of the title ("sham") as it would rhyme with "ham". The Three Dog Night and B.W. Stevenson versions pronounce that syllable to rhyme with "mom".

=== Charts ===
==== Weekly charts ====
Chart (1973)	Peak position
Australia (Kent Music Report)	53
Austria (Ö3 Austria Top 40)	17
Canada Top Singles (RPM)	4
Canada Adult Contemporary (RPM)	2
New Zealand (Listener)	1
South Africa (Springbok Radio)	13
US Billboard Hot 100	3
US Adult Contemporary (Billboard)	3
US Cash Box Top 100	1
West Germany (GfK)	38

==== Year-end charts ====
Chart (1973)	Rank
Canada (RPM)	54
US Billboard Hot 100	31
US Cash Box Top 100	10

=== Certifications ===
Region	Certification	Certified units/sales
United States (RIAA)	Gold	1,000,000^{^}
^{^} Shipments figures based on certification alone.

== B. W. Stevenson version ==
One week before Three Dog Night's version appeared on the charts, Texan singer-songwriter B. W. Stevenson's minute-shorter version bowed at No. 96 and later peaked at No. 66 the week of June 9. It also reached No. 31 on the U.S. Adult Contemporary chart. This lesser-known version is often regarded as country pop or country rock and appears on collections of such. The twang of Stevenson's steel-string acoustic guitar, his Southern accent and an American folk music sound all distinguish it from the better-known Three Dog Night version. In South Africa, Stevenson's version actually charted higher, peaking at No. 8, compared to Three Dog Night's at No. 13.
