= Mama Lion =

American rock band

Background information
- Origin: Los Angeles, California, United States
- Genres: Blues rock; psychedelic rock
- Years active: 1972–1974
- Labels: Family Recordings
- Past members: Lynn Carey; Alan Hurtz; James Newton Howard; Coffi Hall; Neil Merryweather

Mama Lion was an American blues rock band which was active from 1972 to 1974. Fronted by lead singer Lynn Carey. It also included Alan Hurtz, James Newton Howard, Coffi Hall, and Neil Merryweather. Mama Lion released two albums before disbanding in 1974.

== Discography ==
- Preserve Wildlife (1972)
- Give It Everything I've Got (1973)
