= Illinois Speed Press =

American rock band

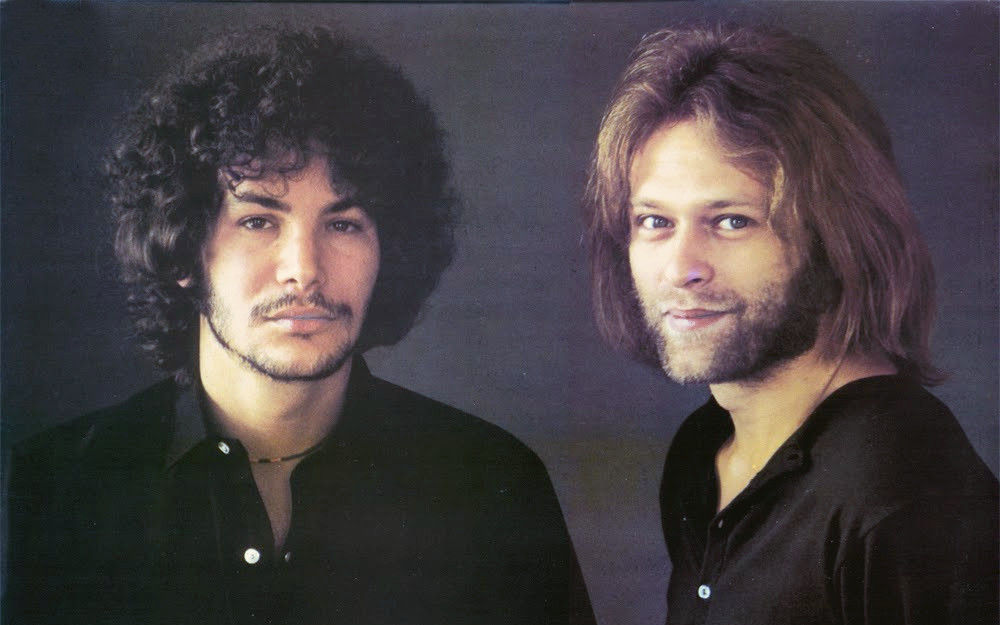

Background information
- Origin: Chicago, Illinois, United States
- Genres: Psychedelic rock, country rock, blues rock
- Years active: 1968–1970, 2009
- Labels: Roulette, Columbia
- Past members: Paul Cotton; Kal David; Mike Anthony; Frank Bartell; Fred Page; Keith Anderson; Rob Lewine; Jimmy Rogers; Rick Allan
- Website: http://illinoisspeedpress.com/

Illinois Speed Press was an American rock band formed – originally, in 1965, as The Rovin' Kind – in Chicago, later relocating to California. The band was formed by Paul Cotton – later of Poco – and Kal David. According to Allmusic, their sound "combined elements of R&B and country music in a powerful double-lead-guitar attack." Cotton and David reunited in 2009 to perform together under the name. Cotton died in July 2021. David died in August 2022.

== History ==
The Capitols were a local group formed by schoolmates at Thornton Township High School in Harvey, Illinois in 1958, including Norman Paul Cotton (then known as Norm "King" Cotton) and Keith Anderson. They became The Mus-Twangs in 1961, primarily an instrumental outfit who released a single, "Marie" on the local Nero label, which was picked up for national distribution by Smash, a subsidiary of Mercury Records. The band next became The Starfires, and Cotton also performed around 1963 as a member of the Carol Vega Trio. Around the same time, Kal David (b. David Raskin) fronted another band in Chicago, The Exceptions, who also included Peter Cetera (later of Chicago).

In early 1965, Cotton formed a new group, The Gentrys, with bassist Frank Bartell and drummer Fred Page (b. Frederick Pappalardo). They were soon joined by Kal David and keyboard player Mike Anthony, and later that year they changed their name to The Rovin' Kind, to avoid confusion with the Memphis band who had a hit with "Keep On Dancing". They released their first single, "Everybody", on the Contrapoint label, and recorded several further singles for the Roulette and Dunwich labels. In 1966, they won a regional "battle of the bands" contest and, as a prize, appeared on American Bandstand. In 1967, Bartell left and was replaced by Keith Anderson. Back in Chicago, The Rovin' Kind became the house band at the Whisky A Go Go, where they were seen by producer James William Guercio, who signed them to a contract with the Columbia Records subsidiary label Epic, and persuaded them to change their name to Illinois Speed Press in February 1968. Norm Cotton changed his stage name to Paul Cotton at the same time, and the band moved to Los Angeles.

With its twin guitar sound, the band played a mixture of rock and roll, soul and country music. In 1968 they performed regularly at the Whisky a Go Go in Hollywood, and at the first Newport Pop Festival, held in Costa Mesa, California, also recording their first single, "Right On Time". Anderson was then fired, and replaced by Rob Lewine before the band recorded their first album, The Illinois Speed Press, which was produced by Guercio and released in early 1969. Columbia simultaneously released albums by Chicago Transit Authority, The Flock, and Aorta, and marketed them together as part of a so-called "Chicago Sound". All four debut albums entered the Billboard Top 200 album chart, The Illinois Speed Press reaching No. 144.

Before the album's release, Guercio fired Page, Anthony, and later Lewine; Page died shortly afterwards after contracting a rare form of leukemia. They were replaced for performances by Jimmy Rogers (bass) and Rick Allen (drums), but the band recorded their second album, Duet, essentially as a duo of Cotton and David, supported by studio musicians including Joe Osborn (bass), Hal Blaine (drums) and Michael Lloyd (keyboards). The album was released in spring 1970, but shortly afterwards Kal David left to form the Fabulous Rhinestones with bassist Harvey Brooks. Cotton was then approached by Richie Furay to join Poco as a replacement for Jim Messina, which he did a few months later.

In 2009, Cotton and David reunited for some performances as Illinois Speed Press.

== Legacy ==
The musical style and dual lead guitar format of Illinois Speed Press have been credited as inspiring Ronnie Van Zant and Gary Rossington to form Lynyrd Skynyrd. The band's two original albums, together with bonus tracks, were reissued on CD in 2003.

== Discography ==
=== Albums ===
- The Illinois Speed Press, Columbia CS 9792, 1969
- Duet, Columbia CS 9976, 1970

=== Singles ===
- "Right On Time" / "Night People", Roulette 4687, 1969
- "Get In The Wind" / "Get In The Wind, Pt. II", Columbia 4-44564, 1969
- "Sadly Out Of Place" / "Country Dumplin'", Columbia 4-45756, 1970
