= Let Me Serenade You =

1968 single by Rhinoceros

"I Will Serenade You"
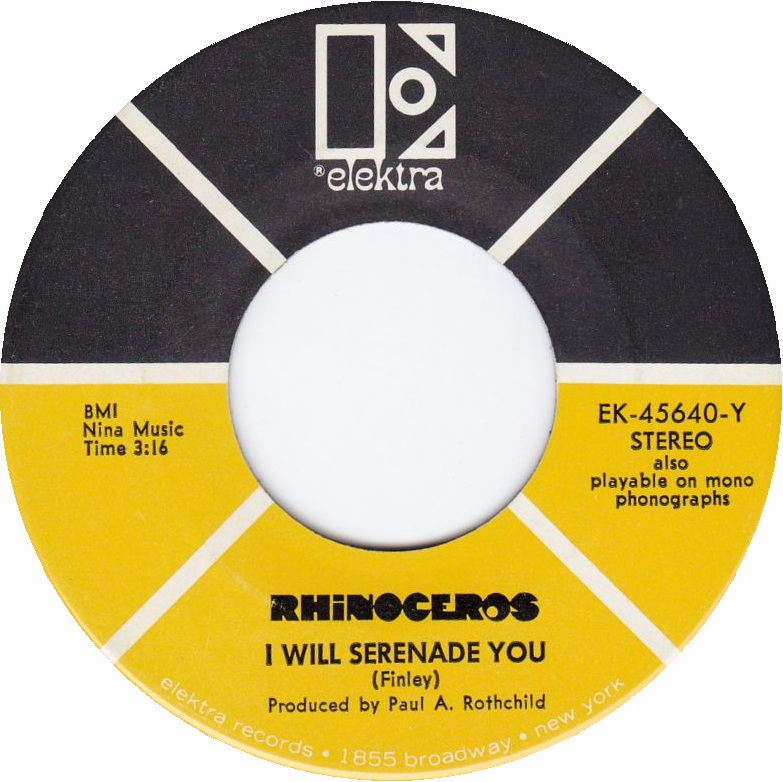

Single by Rhinoceros

from the album Rhinoceros
- A-side: "You're My Girl (I Don't Want to Discuss It)"
- Released: November 1968
- Recorded: Spring 1968
- Genre: Rock
- Length: 3:16
- Label: Elektra
- Songwriter: John Finley
- Producer: Paul A. Rothchild

Audio
- "I Will Serenade You" on YouTube

"Let Me Serenade You"

Single by Three Dog Night

from the album Cyan
- B-side: "Storybook Feeling"
- Released: November 3, 1973
- Studio: American Recording Co., Studio City, Los Angeles
- Genre: Rock
- Length: 3:15
- Label: Dunhill
- Songwriter: John Finley
- Producer: Richard Podolor

Three Dog Night singles chronology
| "Shambala" (1973) | "Let Me Serenade You" (1973) | "The Show Must Go On" (1974) |

Audio
- "Let Me Serenade You" on YouTube

"Let Me Serenade You" is a song written by John Finley. The original version of the song was entitled "I Will Serenade You" and performed by Rhinoceros, appearing on their 1968 self-titled debut album as its closing track and later featured as the B-side of their debut single "You're My Girl (I Don't Want to Discuss It)". It was later covered by Three Dog Night and featured on their 1973 album, Cyan. This version was produced by Richard Podolor and arranged by Podolor and Three Dog Night.

In the US, Three Dog Night's version "Let Me Serenade You" peaked at #17 on the Billboard chart. Outside the US, "Let Me Serenade You" reached #11 in Canada.
