= American Gothic (album) =

Studio album by David Ackles
- Released: July 4, 1972
- Studio: IBC (London)
- Length: 38:53
- Label: Elektra
- Producer: Bernie Taupin

David Ackles chronology
Subway to the Country (1970)	American Gothic (1972)	Five & Dime (1973)

American Gothic is the third studio album by American singer-songwriter David Ackles. It was released on July 4, 1972, by record label Elektra.

== Recording ==
An earlier recording of ”One Night Stand”, different from the one that would later appear on the album, had been released as a single in 1971. This single was produced by Lonnie Mack and also featured a new version of ”Be My Friend” from Ackles’ debut album as the B side.

David Ackles met Elton John and Bernie Taupin in 1970 when Ackles was the opening act at the Troubadour for John’s first US concerts. John and Taupin were both fans of Ackles (who was more popular in the UK than in America) and they became friends. In 1971, Taupin was hired to produce American Gothic and it was decided to record the album in England. Ackles recorded several songs, arranged by Del Newman but, unhappy with the results, convinced Elektra to let him arrange the album himself. Ackles rented a house in Wargrave where he worked on the arrangements for the album.

American Gothic was recorded at IBC Sound Recording Studios in London, England. It was conducted by Robert Kirby.

== Release and reception ==
Professional ratings
Review scores
Source	Rating
AllMusic	4.5/5 stars
Billboard	favorable
Christgau's Record Guide	C−
The Encyclopedia of Popular Music	4/5 stars
Stylus Magazine	A−

American Gothic was released on July 4, 1972. Soon after its release it charted on the Billboard Top LPs, peaking at No. 167, and staying on the chart for 10 weeks. Ramparts called the album "Vivid, lyrical – but at times maudlin and self-indulgent, American Gothic is [Ackles'] best to date". Robert Christgau's review was critical, writing "'I won't get maudlin', Ackles promises midway into the second side, locking himself in the barn as the dappled stallion gallops to join his brothers and sisters on the open range with his mane flying free in the breeze."

In its retrospective review, AllMusic wrote, "American Gothic remains one of those great albums that never found its audience. It waits to be rediscovered."

American Gothic was included in the book 1001 Albums You Must Hear Before You Die. Mojo called it "one of the most beautiful but rarely heard albums of his era".

== Track listing ==
All tracks composed by David Ackles.

No.	Title	Length
1.	"American Gothic"	3:22
2.	"Love's Enough"	3:19
3.	"Ballad of the Ship of State"	4:21
4.	"One Night Stand"	2:53
5.	"Oh, California!"	2:41
6.	"Another Friday Night"	4:32
7.	"Family Band"	2:38
8.	"Midnight Carousel"	3:43
9.	"Waiting for the Moving Van"	3:39
10.	"Blues for Billy Whitecloud"	2:41
11.	"Montana Song"	10:04

== Personnel ==
- Damon Lyon-Shaw, Hugh Jones – engineer
- Robert L. Heimall – art direction
- Michael Ross – photography

== Charts ==
Chart (1967)	Peak position
US Billboard Top LPs	167
