= The Tripp =

Canadian musical group

- Also known as: The Just Us; Livingston's Journey
- Origin: Toronto, Ontario, Canada
- Genres: Rock
- Years active: 1966–1977
- Past members: Neil Merryweather; Stan Endersby

The Tripp, known earlier as The Just Us and later Livingston's Journey, was a Canadian rock band, based in Toronto from the mid-1960s, featuring Neil Merryweather and Stan Endersby.

== History ==
Keyboard player Ed Roth, drummer Bob Ablack, lead guitarist Bill Ross and Brian Hughes started out playing rock instrumentals in a suburban Toronto band the XLs, which became Gary & The Reflections with the addition of singer Gary Muir in 1964.

In early 1965, singer Bob Neilson replaced Muir and the group changed its name to The Ookpiks, after a native-designed stuffed toy owl called Ookpik that was being promoted by the Canadian government. As another Ookpiks group already existed, they briefly became The Sikusis after another stuffed toy, but were unable to get permission from the Canadian government to use the name without compensation and settled on The Just Us. Through all of this they recorded a lone single on the Quality record label, which failed to sell – possibly due in part to confusion caused by name changes.

Hughes, Ross and new drummer Al Morrison soon left to join David Clayton-Thomas's backup band, The Bossmen. Roth and Neilson (later known as Neil Merryweather) brought in bassist Wayne Davis and guitarist Stan Endersby (born 17 July 1947, Lachine Quebec), formerly of C.J. Feeney and the Spellbinders, and convinced Bob Ablack to return on drums. They also recruited a new singer, former Mynah Birds singer Jimmy Livingston. Richard Bell was subsequently hired away from Richie Knight and the Midknights as second keyboardist.

The Just Us recorded an album's worth of material at Arc Sound in early 1966, but this was never released. Throughout this period, they played at various local clubs, including the Gogue Inn and the Hawk's Nest as well as in the city's high schools.

=== The Just Us becomes The Tripp ===
In June 1966, Davis left to play with Bobby Kris & The Imperials and Lillie took over as bassist. Around this time, an American duo with the same name released a couple of singles on Colpix and appeared on the charts and the group was forced to find a new name. They settled on The Group Therapy for one show (opening for The Byrds at Varsity Stadium in Toronto on 22 June), but another local group surfaced with a prior claim to this name. Shortly after a show at the El Patio on 10 September 1966, the band took on another new moniker, The Tripp.

One of the band's first shows was at the Gogue Inn in Toronto on 16 September with Luke & The Apostles and others. The group released no recordings as The Tripp, but did appear on the first episode of CBC Television's Sunday Show and performed regularly on the Toronto club scene, at the Flick, the El Patio and Boris' in Toronto's Yorkville district. Bell left soon after to join Ronnie Hawkins and the Hawks.

In 1966, The Tripp performed at Maple Leaf Gardens with other local bands, and took part in the Toronto Sound-a-gogo show.

Lillie left in May 1967 to play with Ricky James Matthews in The Mynah Byrds and then formed a new band with Bruce Cockburn, The Flying Circus. Dennis Pendrith from Simon Caine & The Catch replaced him and later that month the band changed their name again to Livingston's Tripp and then Livingston's Journey.

== Members ==
- Ed Roth (born 16 February 1947, Toronto)
- Bob Ablack
- Bill Ross (born in Bel Air, California)
- Brian Hughes
- Bob Neilson (born Robert Neilson Lillie, 27 December 1945, Winnipeg, Manitoba, Canada)
- Al Morrison
- Wayne Davis (born 28 April 1946, Toronto)
- Jimmy Livingston (born 28 February 1938)
- Stan Endersby
- Richard Bell
- Dennis Pendrith

== Recordings ==
=== The Just Us ===
"I Don't Love You" / "I Can Tell" (Quality 1738) 1965 – single
