= Subway to the Country =

Studio album by David Ackles
- Released: 1970
- Genre: Singer-songwriter
- Length: 34:07
- Label: Elektra
- Producer: Russ Miller

David Ackles chronology
David Ackles (1968)	Subway to the Country (1970)	American Gothic (1972)

Professional ratings
Review scores
Source	Rating
Allmusic	link
The Encyclopedia of Popular Music	3/5 stars

Subway to the Country is the second album of American singer-songwriter David Ackles.

== Track listing ==
All tracks composed by David Ackles

1. "Main Line Saloon"
2. "That's No Reason to Cry"
3. "Candy Man"
4. "Out on the Road"
5. "Cabin on the Mountain"
6. "Woman River"
7. "Inmates of the Institution"
8. "Subway to the Country"

== Personnel ==
- David Ackles – vocals
- Lonnie Mack – guitar
- Victor Feldman – percussion
- Louie Shelton
- Jim Gordon – drums
- John Audino – horn
- Gary Coleman – percussion
- Don Gallucci
- William Green – woodwind
- Douglas Hastings – guitar
- Jim Horn – saxophone
- Larry Knechtel – bass
- Gordon Marron – strings
- Lew McCreary – horn
- Ollie Mitchell
- Fredric Myrow – arranger, conductor
- Meyer "Mike" Rubin
- Clifford Shank
- Sheridon Stokes – flute
- Tony Terran
- Ray Triscari
- William Ulyate
- Craig Woodson

Technical

- Bruce Botnick, Fritz Richmond - engineer
- William S. Harvey - art direction, design
- Frank Bez - cover photography
