= Michael Fonfara =

Canadian keyboard player (1946–2021)

- Born: August 11, 1946; Stevensville, Ontario, Canada
- Died: January 8, 2021 (aged 74) Toronto, Ontario, Canada
- Genres: Rock; blues; Canadian blues
- Occupations: Musician; pianist
- Instruments: Keyboards; piano
- Years active: 1963–2021

Michael Fonfara (11 August 1946 – 8 January 2021) was a Canadian keyboardist who was most notable for his work as a member of The Electric Flag and Rhinoceros in the 1960s, Rough Trade and Lou Reed's backing band in the 1970s and The Downchild Blues Band, from 1990 to his death. He studied classical piano at The Royal Conservatory of Music. He is a multiple Maple Blues Award winner as Piano/Keyboardist of the year and a Juno Award winner with the Downchild Blues Band. His distinguished musical career was so honoured by the Maple Blues Awards as early as 2000 and a Juno Award in 2014.

== Biography ==
Fonfara's career as a professional musician commenced in 1963, when he started playing in the Toronto band, Lee Jackson & The Checkmates, which evolved into Jon and Lee & The Checkmates soon afterwards. Members of Jon and Lee & The Checkmates ultimately formed the nucleus of the later bands Rhinoceros and Blackstone, plus contributed significantly to the work of Lou Reed in the 1970s.

When Jon and Lee & The Checkmates broke up in September 1967, Fonfara worked briefly with David Clayton-Thomas and then, during the months of November and December, 1967, toured and recorded with The Electric Flag, featuring Buddy Miles and Michael Bloomfield. Fonfara replaced keyboardist and founding Electric Flag member Barry Goldberg. He was then selected by producer Paul Rothchild as a member of the Elektra Records' hand-picked, "supergroup", Rhinoceros, in December 1967. Fonfara was the co-writer of the band's major hit, "Apricot Brandy", and recorded three albums with the group.

Upon the dissolution of Rhinoceros in 1971, Fonfara joined with ex-Rhinoceros bandmates John Finley, Danny Weis, Larry Leishman and Peter Hodgson to form the group Blackstone. The band recorded one album in 1972, On The Line, again produced by Paul Rothchild, prior to splintering and then breaking up in 1973. Fonfara thereafter commenced working with Lou Reed, an association that continued throughout the balance of the 1970s. Fonfara caught Reed's attention for his work on The Everly Brothers' 1974 album Stories We Could Tell. In 1976, Fonfara was a member of controversial Toronto-based band Rough Trade, acting as keyboard player and arranger on their first album. He left the band at the end of 1977 in a dispute over payment for his work on Rough Trade's live revue show Restless Underwear. During the latter part of the 1970s and continuing to 1981, he was a member of the pop rock group Tycoon, based in New York City, which recorded two albums. He also played as a session musician on "Urgent" by Foreigner, a single that reached #4 in the US and #1 in Canada; the single's parent album Foreigner 4 hit number 1 on Billboard and was certified 6× platinum.

In the 1980s, Fonfara returned to Toronto, where he became a key member of the Canadian R&B band The Lincolns. The Lincolns had been founded by Prakash John, with whom Fonfara had first played in a later version of Blackstone in 1973 and, thereafter, when both were playing and recording with Lou Reed, during the balance of the 1970s. Fonfara continued to play with The Lincolns, while remaining a member of The Downchild Blues Band, which he joined in 1990. In 2000, 2004, 2007 and 2009, he was the recipient of the Maple Blues Award, as piano/keyboard player of the year. Fonfara's career-based contributions to blues music were recognized through his nomination in 2008 and 2009 for the "Blues With A Feeling" Maple Blues Award.

In 2010, Fonfara was a member of Grant Fullerton's band Jamnation. They played at the Strawberry Festival on 1 July that year.

== Personal life ==
He married model Avril Lund (born 1950) and had two children with her before he died on 8 January 2021 at 74 in a Toronto hospital, following a two-year battle with cancer.

== Discography ==
=== Jon and Lee & The Checkmates ===
- 1967 "Bring It Down Front/Pork Chops" (ABC/Spartan; single only)

=== Electric Flag ===
- 1968 A Long Time Comin' (Columbia)
- 1995 Old Glory: Best of the Electric Flag, An American Music Band (Sony)

=== Rhinoceros ===
- 1968 Rhinoceros (Elektra)
- 1969 Satin Chickens (Elektra)
- 1970 Better Times Are Coming (Elektra)

=== Blackstone ===
- 1972 On The Line (1972)

=== Lou Reed ===
- 1974 Sally Can't Dance (RCA)
- 1976 Rock and Roll Heart (Arista)
- 1977 Walk on the Wild Side: The Best of Lou Reed (RCA)
- 1978 Street Hassle (Arista)
- 1978 Live: Take No Prisoners (Arista; expanded CD reissue 2002 by BMG Heritage)
- 1979 The Bells (Arista) Fonfara is also executive producer of the album.
- 1980 Growing Up in Public (Arista). Fonfara also co-produced and co-wrote the album with Lou Reed.
- 1980 Rock and Roll Diary: 1967-1980 (Arista)
- 2005 Coney Island Baby (30th Anniversary Edition of 1975 RCA release.) 1975 recordings omitted four tracks from the original release and to which Fonfara contributed, now included in anniversary edition.

=== Rough Trade ===
- 1976 Rough Trade Live! Direct To Disc (Umbrella Records)

=== Tycoon ===
- 1979 Tycoon (Arista)

=== The Lincolns ===
- 1983 Take One (Attic)

=== Downchild ===
- 1994 Good Times Guaranteed (Downchild Music)
- 1997 Lucky 13 (Downchild Music)
- 2004 Come On In (Downchild Music)
- 2007 Live At The Palais Royale (Downchild Music)

=== Selected other contributions ===
- 1968 David Ackles, David Ackles, also known as Road to Cairo (Elektra)
- 1972 Everly Brothers, Stories We Could Tell (RCA; expanded CD reissue 2002 by BMG International as Stories We Could Tell:The RCA Years.)
- 1974 Ian Matthews, Some Days You Eat The Bear (Elektra)
- 1975 Rory Block, Rory Block (United Artists)
- 1981 Foreigner, Foreigner 4 (Atlantic)
- 1982 Foreigner, Records (Atlantic)
- 1984 Amos Garrett, Amosbehavin' (Stony Plain)
- 1993 Joe Mavety, Sunburst (A&M Records)
- 1994 Michael Bloomfield, Don't Say That I Ain't Your Man: Essential Blues 1964-1969 (Columbia/Legacy)
- 1999 Grievous Angels, 22 Trailer Park (Jimmy Boyle Records). Fonfara also produced the album.
- 2000 Snooky Pryor and Mel Brown, Double Shot (Electro-Fi)
- 2001 Jimmy Thompson "She's A Snake In The Grass" (Fox Lake Records)
- 2002 Northern Blues Gospel Allstars, Saved (Northern Blues)
- 2002 Cameo Blues Band, All Play and No Work (Make It Real)
- 2002 Robbie Rox and The Monster Horn Band, Earl Owns the World (Robbie Rox Records)
- 2003 Brian Gauci, Guitar Romp (Dynasound)
- 2004 Sam Myers, Coming from the Old School (Electro-Fi)
- 2004 Willie "Big Eyes" Smith, Bluesin' It (Electro-Fi)
- 2004 Maria Aurigema, Take Me
- 2004 Angela Scappatura, A Little Bit of Sugar (Itchy Pink). Fonfara also produced the album.
- 2004 Kevin Mark, Rolling The Dice (Blue Hog)
- 2005 Brian Blain, Overqualified for the Blues (Northern Blues)
- 2007 Steve Grisbrook, Blue Sneakers (Independent)
- 2007 Jack DeKeyzer, Blues Thing (Blue Star)
- 2007 Kevin Mark, Cuttin' Loose (Blue Hog)
- 2012 Joe Mavety, In Orbit (Alien Records)
