= Stories We Could Tell: The RCA Years =

Compilation album by The Everly Brothers
- Released: 2003
- Recorded: 1972–1973
- Genre: Country rock
- Label: BMG International
- Producer: Paul Rothchild, Chet Atkins

The Everly Brothers chronology
Live/Reunion Concert (2003)	Stories We Could Tell: The RCA Years (2003)	Hall of Fame (2003)

Professional ratings
Review scores
Source	Rating
Allmusic	3.5/5 stars

Stories We Could Tell: The RCA Years is a country rock compilation album by The Everly Brothers, released in 2003. The original LP Stories We Could Tell was produced by Paul Rothchild and released by RCA Victor in 1972. This CD contains the original album plus eight of the twelve tracks from the Everlys' other RCA album, Pass the Chicken & Listen.

== Track listing ==
1. "All We Really Want To Do" (Bonnie Bramlett, Delaney Bramlett) – 2:22
2. "Breakdown" (Kris Kristofferson) – 3:12
3. "Green River" (Don Everly, Phil Everly) – 4:42
4. "Mandolin Wind" (Rod Stewart) – 3:01
5. "Up in Mabel's Room" (Phil Everly, Terry Slater) – 3:15
6. "Del Rio Dan" (Jeff Kent, Doug Lubahn, Holli Beckwith) – 3:57
7. "Ridin' High" (Dennis Linde) – 2:41
8. "Christmas Eve Can Kill You" (Dennis Linde) – 3:26
9. "Three Armed, Poker-Playin' River Rat" (Dennis Linde) – 2:46
10. "I'm Tired of Singing My Song in Las Vegas" (Don Everly) – 3:14
11. "The Brand New Tennessee Waltz" (Jesse Winchester) – 3:11
12. "Lay It Down" (Gene Thomas) – 3:16
13. "Husbands and Wives" (Roger Miller) – 2:21
14. "Woman Don't Try to Tie Me Down" (Joe Allen) – 3:59
15. "Sweet Memories" (Mickey Newbury) – 2:53
16. "Ladies Love Outlaws" (Lee Clayton) – 3:11
17. "Not Fade Away" (Buddy Holly, Norman Petty) – 1:58
18. "Somebody Nobody Knows" (Kris Kristofferson) – 3:38
19. "Good Hearted Woman" (Waylon Jennings, Willie Nelson) – 2:35
20. "Stories We Could Tell" (John Sebastian) – 3:19

== Personnel ==
- Don Everly - guitar, vocals
- Phil Everly - guitar, vocals
- Delaney Bramlett - guitar, vocals
- Jeff Kent - guitar, vocals
- Dennis Linde - guitar, keyboards
- Geoff Muldaur - guitar
- Wayne Perkins - guitar
- John Sebastian - guitar, harmonica, vocals
- Waddy Wachtel - guitar
- Danny Weis - guitar
- Clarence White - guitar
- Ry Cooder - electric bottleneck guitar on "Green River" & "Del Rio Dan"
- Buddy Emmons - slide guitar
- Jerry McGee - slide guitar
- Barry Beckett - keyboards
- Michael Fonfara - keyboards
- Spooner Oldham - keyboards
- Warren Zevon - keyboards
- Johny Barbata - drums
- Jim Gordon - drums
- Russ Kunkel - drums
- George Bohanon - brass
- Tommy Johnson - brass
- Chris Ethridge - bass
- Jimmie Haskell - string arrangement
- Delaney Bramlett - vocals
- David Crosby - vocals
- Doug Lubahn - vocals
- Graham Nash - vocals
