= Kal David =

American musician (1943–2022)

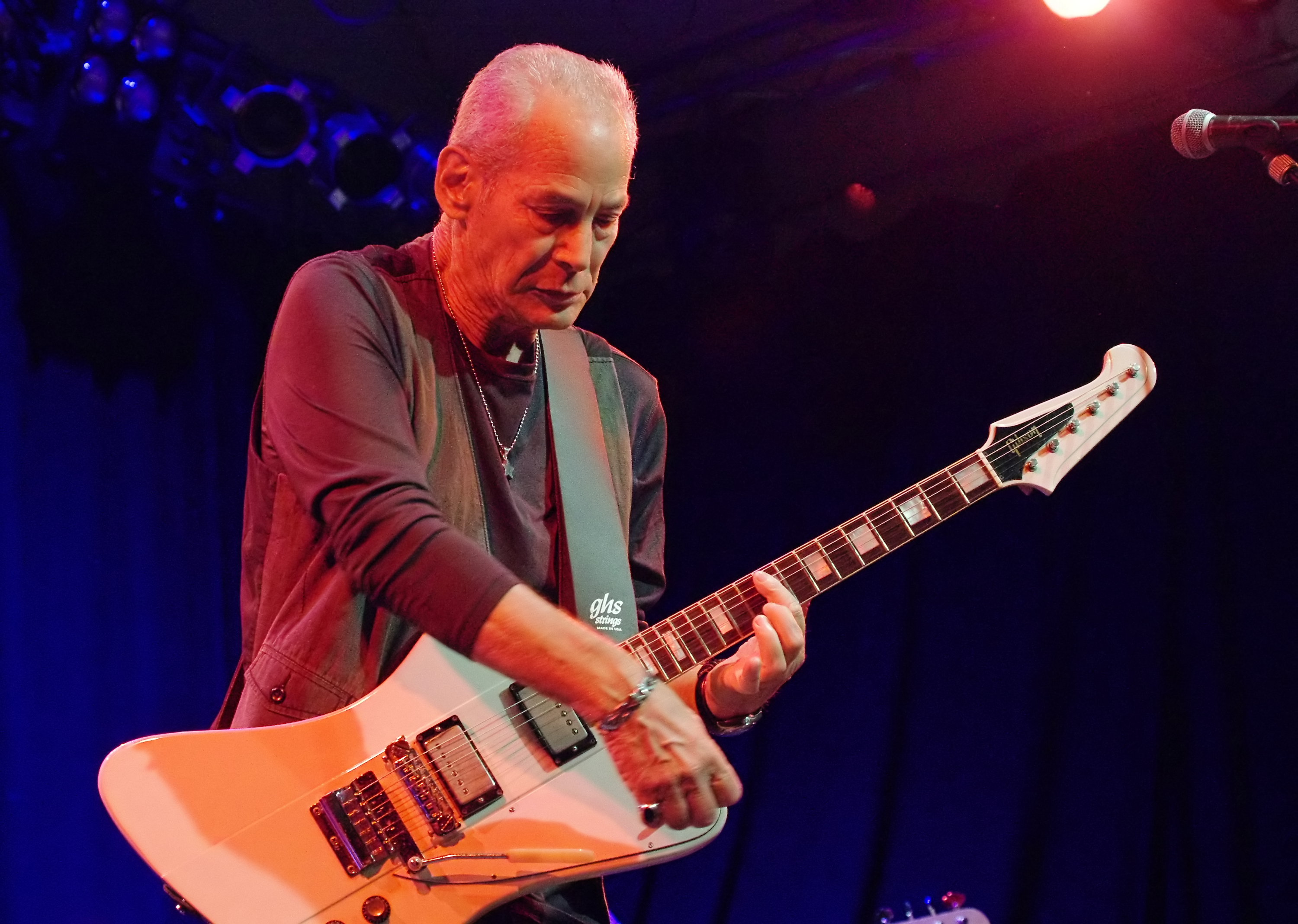
- David performing in Unna in 2013

Background information
- Born: David Raskin; June 15, 1943; Chicago, Illinois, U.S.
- Died: August 16, 2022 (aged 79)
- Genres: Blues
- Occupations: Singer-songwriter, musician
- Instruments: Vocals, guitar
- Years active: 1962–2022
- Labels: King; Vee-Jay; Paramount Records; 20th Century; Soul Coast
- Website: www.kaldavid.com

David Raskin (June 15, 1943 – August 16, 2022), who performed as Kal David, was an American blues guitarist, singer and songwriter, whose 50-year musical career in Illinois, New York, and California extended through various phases, including a highly regarded stint with Columbia Records in the early 1970s.

== Early years (1960s and 1970s) ==
Born in Chicago, Illinois, United States, Raskin began using the performing name "Kal David" in his late teens as the frontman of his neighborhood band, 'Kal David and the Exceptions', formed in 1961. Its other members were Peter Cetera (bass, vocals), Denny Ebert (drums, vocals), and Marty Grebb (saxophone, keyboards, guitar, vocals). Cetera later joined the Big Thing, which became Chicago, and Grebb joined the Buckinghams. Around this time Kal David and the Exceptions were regular performers at the Interlude Club on Pulaski in Chicago.

Kal David left the group to sign a recording contract with King Records and, later with Tollie Records (a subsidiary of Vee-Jay Records). In 1965, during his stint at Vee-Jay, he formed a new duo, 'The Rovin' Kind', with guitarist Paul Cotton, and the two transferred to Dunwich Records. Following a name change to Illinois Speed Press and a move to Los Angeles in 1968, the duo recorded two albums for Columbia Records, the self-titled Illinois Speed Press and Duet.

In the early 1970s, as Cotton joined the band Poco as its lead guitarist, David decided to leave the West Coast for the East and moved to Woodstock, the small-town/rural New York area, in the vicinity of previous year's iconic Festival. His new group, 'The Fabulous Rhinestones' featuring ex-Electric Flag bassist Harvey Brooks and ex-Buckinghams' keyboard player Marty Grebb, recorded three albums: Fabulous Rhinestones, Freewheelin' (on Paramount Records) and Rhinestones (on 20th Century Records). Friends advised him to visit a club in Woodstock and it was there that he met his future wife, vocalist Lauri Bono, who subsequently accompanied him back to Los Angeles for the next phase of their career, doing sidework for Etta James and Johnny Rivers.

== Later phase (1980s through 2020s) ==
In the early 1980s, David played lead guitar for John Mayall on an album which would be released a decade later. Two albums for Soul Coast Records, Never a Dull Moment and Double Tuff each met with critical acclaim and worldwide record sales coupled with numerous television appearances, including a one-hour special featuring David in Germany.

At Hollywood's China Club, the Kal David Band headed up the weekly Pro-Jam which drew celebrity performers such as Johnny Rivers, Stevie Wonder, Bobby Brown, John Entwistle, Larry Carlton, Brian Wilson, Stephen Stills, Joe Walsh and Paul Young, as well as blues musicians Sam "The Man" Taylor and Floyd Dixon.

The early 1990s saw David and Bono move to Palm Springs, California, and form yet another band, Kal David and the Real Deal. This group featured both David and Bono on vocals, along with former Chaka Khan musical director Tony Patler on Hammond B-3 organ and drummer Alan Diaz, formerly with Sérgio Mendes. David even tried local radio, hosting the late night "Blue Monday" blues show on Palm Springs soft rock station KEZN.

On July 14, 1998, the couple opened the 'Blue Guitar' blues club above the Plaza Theatre in Palm Springs, which lasted six years, closing in 2004.

David and Bono continued to tour and frequently played at B.B. King's Blues Club in Los Angeles and the Mohegan Sun Resort and Casino in Connecticut.

David is the voice of 'Sonny Eclipse', a singing alien audio-animatronic, who resides at Cosmic Ray's Starlight Cafe at the Magic Kingdom in Walt Disney World. He did another performance for Disney World at Epcot, where he performed the "Unhealthy Living Blues" for the Goofy About Health exhibit at the Wonders of Life pavilion.

Kal David died on August 16, 2022, at the age of 79.

== Honors ==
In 2004, a Golden Palm Star on the Palm Springs Walk of Stars was dedicated to Kal David and Lauri Bono.

== Discography ==
- Paragon – Kal David and Lauri Bono (2018) Take That Task Records
- Living the Dream – Kal David and Lauri Bono (2015) Crytone/CD Baby
- Kal David Band LIVE! – Kal David (featuring Miss Lauri Bono) (2015) Ari Records
- Crossroads of My Life – Kal David (2010) Crytone/CD Baby
- Live... At Blue Guitar... Last Call – Lauri Bono (featuring Kal David) (2006) Blue Guitar
- Live... At Blue Guitar... Last Call – Kal David (2006) Blue Guitar
- Live at Blue Guitar... By Request – Kal David and The Real Deal (2001) Blue Guitar
- Double Tuff – Kal David (1993) Soul Coast/Nova
- Never A Dull Moment – Kal David (1992) Soul Coast/Nova
- Cross Country Blues – John Mayall's Bluesbreakers (with Kal David, Don McMinn, Coco Montoya) [recorded 1981 and 1984] (1992) One Way
- The Rhinestones – The Fabulous Rhinestones (Kal David, Harvey Brooks, Marty Grebb) (1975) Just Sunshine/20th Century
- Freewheelin' – The Fabulous Rhinestones (Kal David, Harvey Brooks, Marty Grebb) (1973) Just Sunshine/Paramount
- The Fabulous Rhinestones – The Fabulous Rhinestones (Kal David, Harvey Brooks, Marty Grebb) (1972) Just Sunshine/Paramount
- Vacuum Cleaner – Merryweather & Carey (Neil Merryweather and Lynn Carey) (1971) RCA Victor
- Duet – Illinois Speed Press (Kal David and Paul Cotton) (1970) Columbia
- Illinois Speed Press – Illinois Speed Press (Kal David and Paul Cotton) (1969) Columbia
- Chhalia (original soundtrack recording) (features Kal David and others) (7-inch 45 rpm EP release) (196?) Angel [India] Records
- "Can't Sit Down" b/w "You Turn Me On" – Barney Pip with The Rovin' Kind (7-inch single release) (1967) Smash Records
- "She" b/w "Didn't Want To Have To Do It" – The Rovin' Kind (Kal David and Paul Cotton) (7-inch single release) (1967) Dunwich Records
- "My Generation" b/w "Girl" – The Rovin' Kind (Kal David and Paul Cotton) (7-inch single release) (1966) Dunwich Records
- "Right On Time" b/w "Night People" – The Rovin' Kind (Kal David and Paul Cotton) (7-inch single release) (1966) Roulette Records
- "Everybody" b/w "Bound To Roam" – The Rovin' Kind (Kal David and Paul Cotton) (7-inch single release) (1965) Contrapoint Records
- "Come On Home" b/w "Dancin' Danny" – Kal David and The Exceptions (7-inch single release) (1965) Tollie Records [subsidiary of Vee-Jay]
- "Searchin'" b/w "Daydreaming Of You" – Kal David and The Exceptions (7-inch single release) (1964) Tollie Records [subsidiary of Vee-Jay]
- "Forgotten Dreams" b/w "Little Everyday Things" – Kal David and The Exceptions (7-inch single release) (1962) Ardore Records

== Equipment ==
- 1964 Gibson Firebird V
- 1963 (?) Gibson Firebird III Custom
- 1998 Fender Vibroverb
- 2000 Mesa Maverick Combo
- 1955 Vintage Gibson Echoplex
