= Five & Dime =

Studio album by David Ackles
- Released: October 1973
- Studio: Paramount, Ackles' Rock n' Roll Rancho
- Genre: Singer-songwriter, Americana
- Label: Columbia
- Producer: Douglas Graham, David Ackles

David Ackles chronology
American Gothic (1972)	Five & Dime (1973)

Five & Dime is the fourth studio album by American singer-songwriter David Ackles. Released in October 1973 by Columbia Records, it was Ackles' final album.

== Background ==
Following the release of American Gothic the previous year, Ackles felt immense pressure to follow up on its critical success. "I figured there was no way I could surpass what I had done in terms of the reviewers, because they had already committed themselves to it being better than peanut butter," Ackles said in a 1974 interview in Melody Maker. "I was literally stymied. Within the first few months after American Gothic came out I couldn't write a song."

Ackles switched to Columbia Records in part because the company agreed to let him record independent of label oversight. He drew upon a variety of sources for the new group of songs. "The songs are intended to be much more easy to get into, and I felt that it was time I lightened up a bit and made the album a little more accessible," he said.

"Surf's Down," a Beach Boys-esque parody, was informed by his own surfing hobby as a youth. "Postcards" was a response to his extensive stay in England while recording American Gothic. "House Above the Strand" referenced his home in Pacific Palisades. "Aberfan" explores the tragedy of the 1966 Welsh mining disaster, and originally included a second part connecting the tragedy to the My Lai massacre, but was cut for length. "Run Pony, Run" was inspired by recent beef shortages and the uptick in the horse meat trade. "I've Been Loved" was inspired in part by his grandmother and her lengthy hospitalization.

== Recording ==
Five & Dime was recorded at Paramount Recording Studios in Los Angeles and at David Ackles home in Pacific Palisades (credited as "Ackles' Rock n' Roll Rancho"). His home recordings utilized a four-track TEAC 3340 recorder. The basic tracks were recorded at home, and included drums, guitar and bass. His bathroom was used as an echo chamber.

Ackles utilized a smaller group of musicians as compared to his previous album. The backing musicians featured folk musician Bruce Langhorne, most notable for his work with Bob Dylan. Other players included jazz and session player Loren Pickford, Wrecking Crew member Gene Cipriano and jazz drummer Colin Bailey. The USC Trojan String Quartet, which had previously played at Ackles' wedding, also appeared on the record.

Backing vocals on "Surf's Down" were provided by Dean Torrence of Jan and Dean. Bruce Johnston assisted Ackles in arranging the multi-part vocal lines, and was scheduled to sing as well. On the day of the recording at Paramount Studios, Johnston was ill and could not participate.

== Release ==
Five & Dime was released in October 1973. It did not chart and Columbia Records dropped Ackles from the label.

== Reception ==
Professional ratings
Review scores
Source	Rating
AllMusic	4/5 stars
The Rolling Stone Record Guide	2/5 stars
Shindig!	4/5 stars
Walrus!	Merit Album

Five & Dime received less attention than his previous albums, and little publicity from the record label, though it was critically well received.

Rolling Stone called it "quietly satisfying" in a favorable review, applauding the "restrained elegance" of the music. "Ackles knows how to set a scene and fill it with precise, telling detail, then top it off with a pithy phrase." Of "Aberfan" Rolling Stone noted that "...Ackles has provided an excellent programmatic arrangement, whose nuances of coloration and use of classical dissonance transcend the pop idiom into the realm of lieder." The Rolling Stone Record Guide, six years later, assessed it less favorably, describing Ackles' prior albums as stronger work and his style as pretentious.

Chris Van Ness in the Los Angeles Free Press compared it favorably to Ackles' previous album, though he described it as "not quite as ambitious": "Last year David Ackles' American Gothic was my choice for the Number One Album of 1972. This yeaer, Five and Dime is certainly assured of a high position in the Top Ten." Variety reported the album as "a sterling program of good, new tunes." Billboard listed it as a "Top Album Pick" with "fine vocals, sensitive tunes, and excellent piano work," singling out "I've Been Loved" and "Surf's Down" as best cuts.

High Fidelity lauded "I've Been Loved," "Everybody Has a Story," and "Surf's Down" as the best tracks. "The wry, clever lyrics are delivered in the same firm baritone to the tune of the same half-rock, half-Broadway for which the California native is justifiably famous." "Once ever year Ackles dips into his musical comedy and rock backgrounds to bring us another joyous fusion of rock and Broadway. This newest is especially worthwhile," according to Michael Jahn of Cue. "Ackles is a much more serious songwriter than most rockers, and deserves a lot of attention."

Subsequent critics have also lauded the album. "...a collection of miniatures," said the AllMusic critic William Ruhlmann. "It's pleasures are more subtle than in the expansive American Gothic but no less real." "On Five & Dime, Ackles certainly doesn't sell out," says Michael Baker, writing for Perfect Sound Forever. "The world still squelches the characters' independence and manhood; the sadness still rushes out of the pale bodies like the sparks of a failed missile; and the heroes still treat love, the past, and relations as palpable memories, with the sting of newness ready to flee."

Writer Kasper Nijsen noted that "Five & Dime may not be as tightly-knit as American Gothic, but as a many-colored patchwork of varied songs, the album has few rivals." Of the 2018 reissue by Floating World, Shindig! said "Its panoramic ambition encapsulates a surf parody...and various orchestrated vignettes that are less rock and more filmic musical....if there ever was a candidate for a boxed set, Mr. Ackles is a contender. Until then, this will do."

== Track listing ==
All tracks composed by David Ackles.

1. "Everybody Has a Story"
2. "I've Been Loved"
3. "Jenna Saves"
4. "Surf's Down"
5. "Berry Tree"
6. "One Good Woman's Man"
7. "Run Pony Run"
8. "Aberfan"
9. "House Above the Strand"
10. "A Photograph of You"
11. "Such a Woman"
12. "Postcards"

== Personnel ==
Technical

- Douglas Graham, David Ackles - producer
- Larry Hirsch, Roger Dollarhide, Douglas Graham - engineering
- Larry Hirsch - mixing
- Michael Wasp - cover art
- Beverly Parker - art direction

Musical

- David Ackles - vocals, piano, arrangements
- Loren Pickford - alto flute, tenor saxophone, acoustic guitar
- Dean Torrence - backing vocals
- Gene Cipriano - baritone saxophone
- Robert L. Adcock - cello
- James Kanter - clarinet
- Patrick Smith - double bass
- Bobby Bruce - fiddle
- Georgia Mohammar - flute
- Robert Henderson - french horn
- Todd Miller - french horn
- Lou Anne Neill - harp
- Bruce Langhorne - lead guitar (electric), bass guitar
- Earle Dumler - oboe, English horn
- Red Rhodes - pedal steel guitar
- Colin Bailey - percussion, vibraphone, drums
- Dawn Weiss - piccolo flute
- Janice Graham - rhythm guitar
- John Daley - trombone
- Russell Kidd - trumpet
- Zigmant Kanstul - trumpet
- Edmond Welter - tuba
- Barbara Thomason - viola
- Cynthia Cole Daley - first violin
- Donald Ambroson - second violin
