= The Mynah Birds =

Canadian band

- Origin: Toronto, Ontario, Canada
- Genres: Rhythm and blues, rock and roll, garage rock, blues rock
- Years active: 1964–1967
- Labels: Columbia, Motown, Hip-O
- Past members: Jimmy Livingstone; Ian Goble; Rick Cameron; Goldy McJohn (deceased); Nick St. Nicholas; Rick James (deceased); Frank Arnel; Bruce Palmer (deceased); Rickman Mason; Tom Morgan (deceased); John Taylor; Neil Young; Neil Merryweather (deceased); John Klassen

The Mynah Birds was a Canadian R&B band formed in Toronto, Ontario, that was active from 1964 to 1967. Although the band never released an album, it is notable as featuring a number of musicians, such as Rick James and Neil Young, who went on to have successful careers in rock, folk rock, and funk.

Over its short lifespan, the group featured many members in its many different configurations. Its most memorable lineup included Rick James, Neil Young, Bruce Palmer, Rickman Mason, and John Taylor. Rick James would later become a major funk star in the 1970s and 1980s. Young and Palmer went on to become two of the founding members in the popular West Coast folk rock group Buffalo Springfield. After leaving Buffalo Springfield and Crosby, Stills, Nash & Young, Neil Young would go on to achieve fame as a solo artist. Goldy McJohn and Nick St. Nicholas would later become members of the rock band Steppenwolf. Also, a late-running 1967 version of the Mynah Birds featured heavy rocker Neil Merryweather.

== History ==
The Mynah Birds grew out of a 1964 group fronted by Jimmy "Liver" Livingston (born February 28, 1941, Nova Scotia; died June 1, 2002) and also including guitarist Ian Goble, drummer Rick Cameron, organist John Goadsby (aka Goldy McJohn) and bassist Nick Kassbaum (aka Nick St. Nicholas).

In the early 1960s, a 15-year-old singer named James Johnson signed up for the U.S. Naval Reserves. When called up for active service in August 1964, he went to Canada and made his way to Toronto, Ontario. There he almost immediately got into an altercation on Yonge Street. As he tells it in his autobiography, Johnson was rescued from a beating by a couple of local musicians, Levon Helm and Garth Hudson of Levon and the Hawks, who would achieve legendary status as the Band. Hudson and Helm took the shaken young sailor to a local bar, where he jumped up onstage with the band playing at the time. That group was impressed enough that they invited him to join them, and renamed themselves the Sailorboys.

Johnson quickly built a rapport with many of the Toronto music scene's busiest performers. One of them was Shirley Matthews, a local celebrity at the time: she’d had a big Canadian hit with "Big Town Boy" the previous year. Matthews, learning that Johnson was a fugitive and in danger of being found out, suggested he call himself Ricky Matthews (or Ricky James Matthews), after a cousin of hers who had died. At some point, the Sailorboys changed their name to the Mynah Birds, though the lineup shifted frequently.

An amended line-up, comprising Rick James, St. Nicholas, Rick Cameron and guitarist Frank Arnel (aka Frank Iozzo), recorded "The Mynah Birds Song" for Columbia Records in late 1964 as a prospective single. However, the track was not deemed strong enough and a new track, "The Mynah Birds Hop", was recorded for the A-side. The second track saw James and Livingston trading vocals, backed by St Nicholas, Arnel, McJohn and drummer Richie Grand (born June 11, 1945 in Toronto, Ontario). The single was released in Canada in early 1965, but was not a hit.

Shortly thereafter, Bruce Palmer joined the band in an unusual bass-player swap: Jack London & The Sparrows gave up Palmer to get Mynah Birds bassist St. Nicholas. Shortly after, a major split in the group left Rick James and Bruce Palmer to put together a new version of The Mynah Birds. In essence they absorbed a band from Brantford, Ontario, called the Bunkies–drummer Rickman Mason (born 1945) and guitarists Tom Morgan (born 1944) and John Taylor (1946–2002). Morgan was replaced by Neil Young in January 1966. (Singer Jimmy Livingson, after leaving The Mynah Birds in April 1965, joined The Muddy Yorks and then The Just Us, which evolved into The Tripp.)

In early 1966, the Mynah Birds were signed to Motown Records. Shortly before recording began, bassist Bruce Palmer invited an acquaintance of his to join the band: local folk musician Neil Young. An article about the Mynah Birds in a May 1966 Billboard magazine indicated that their first single would be an original song called "I've Got You In My Soul". That never happened, likely because somebody noticed that "I've Got You In My Soul" sounded remarkably similar to a Them (the band fronted by Van Morrison) song called "Little Girl". Still, the Mynah Birds completed a single that was prepared for release on Motown's V.I.P. imprint, called "It's My Time".

But the band's manager apparently misappropriated their advance money from Motown and they fired him. In return, the manager informed Motown that the band's singer was AWOL from the Navy. Rick James was taken into custody and incarcerated by the Navy. "It's My Time" remained unreleased, and Motown scrapped plans for a Mynah Birds album. Neil Young and Bruce Palmer bought a hearse, drove to Los Angeles, and helped form Buffalo Springfield, whose tribute to that period of their career was the Neil Young song, "Mr. Soul". ("It's My Time" became one of the great lost Motown singles. It made its first official appearance in a Motown boxed set released in 2006, and recently appeared in its originally intended form, with its b-side "Go On and Cry", for 2012's 'Record Store Day'.)

As the Motown contract stipulated that the group must fulfill six months of work, Rickman Mason and John Taylor drafted in former guitarist Tom Morgan and two new musicians, singer Mark Smith and former Bunkies bass player John Klassen (b. Brantford, Ontario). The Mynah Birds resumed gigging, appearing at numerous venues throughout Ontario, including a return to the El Patio in Toronto (8–10 August), a performance at the Whitby Arena (31 August) and a show at Peggy's Pavilion in Stroud (10 September) by which point Robert Benedict had replaced Morgan on guitar.

After some months in the navy brig, Matthews was released and returned to Toronto in May 1967 to assemble a new group of Mynah Birds and returned to Motown to record. The new lineup, which included Neil Lillie (aka Merryweather) on bass, Al Morrison on drums, Vernon Wayne Pickell on organ and Bill Ross on guitar, was short-lived, but did record a new version of "It's My Time" (and likely other songs) for Motown. Sessions ended following a strong disagreement between Matthews and Ross; Ross left and the others returned to Toronto where Matthews was arrested and spent time in the Don Jail.

Matthews later returned to Motown in Detroit and produced Bobby Taylor's Taylor Made Soul album. Possibly because there was no longer any need to hide behind the borrowed Toronto surname, Ricky James Matthews became simply Rick James.

On the 2017 Motown Unreleased 1966 digital album release, two additional songs by the Mynah Birds were included: "I Got You (In My Soul)" and "I'll Wait Forever".

== Discography ==
=== Singles ===
Year	Title	Label
1965	"The Mynah Bird Hop"/"The Mynah Bird Song"	Columbia

=== Compilation inclusions ===
Year	Song	Album	Label	Notes
2006	"It's My Time"	The Complete Motown Singles, Vol. 6: 1966	Hip-O	Recorded in 1966
2006	"Go On and Cry"	The Complete Motown Singles, Vol. 6: 1966	Hip-O	Recorded in 1966
2016	"I Got You (In My Soul)"	Motown Unreleased: 1966	Motown	Recorded in 1966
2016	"I'll Wait Forever"	Motown Unreleased: 1966	Motown	Recorded in 1966

== See also ==
- Music of Canada

== Bibliography ==
- Chong, Kevin. Neil Young nation. p. 128-132. 2005. Greystone Books. 9781553651161. Retrieved 2010-12-16.
- McDonough, Jimmy. Shakey: Neil Young's Biography. 2003. Random House of Canada. 9780679311935. Retrieved 2010-12-16.
- Biography of Goldy McJohn. McJohn's official web-site. Retrieved 2010-12-17.
