= David Ackles =

American singer-songwriter (1937–1999)

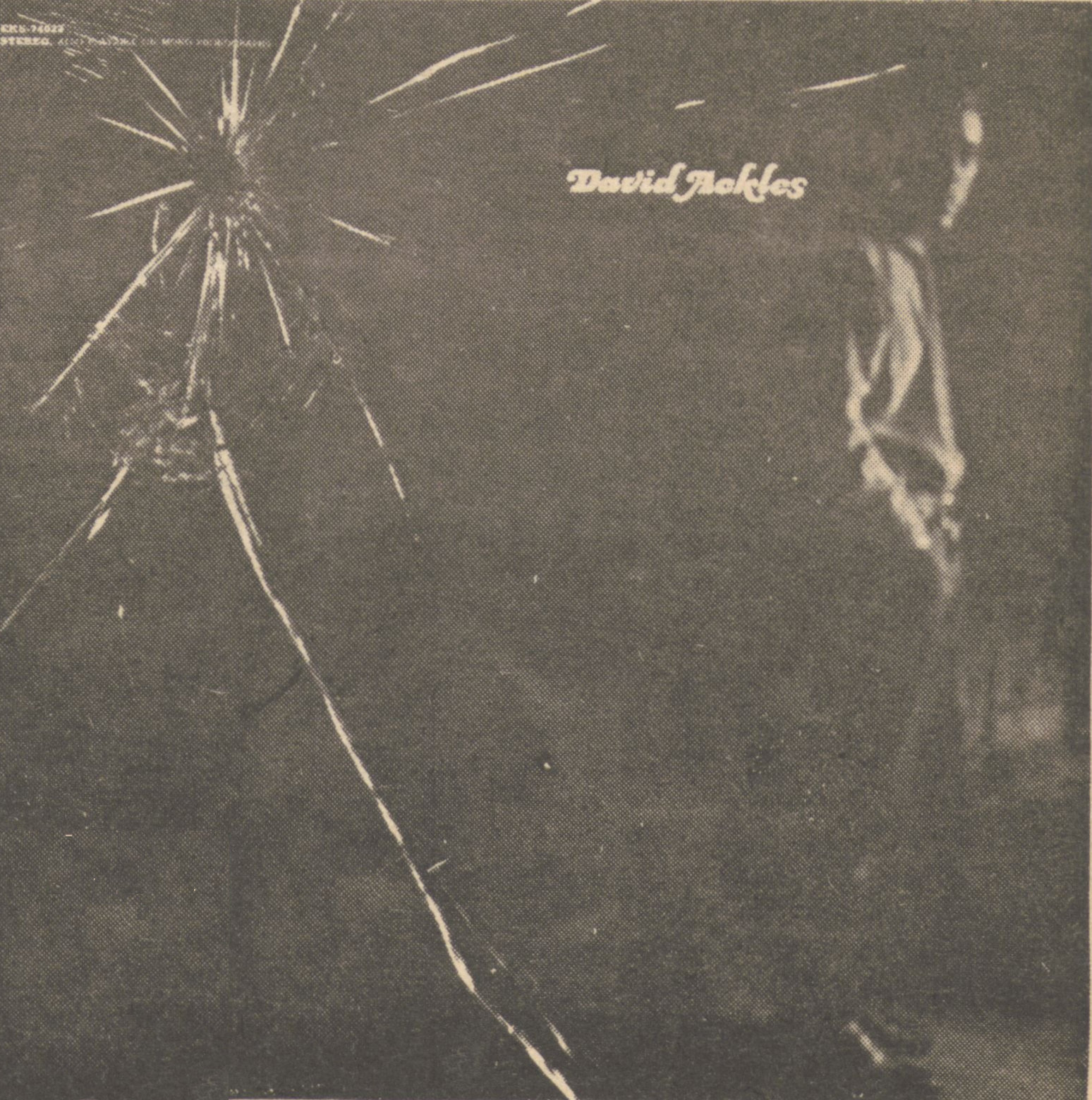
- Ackles' eponymous first album, 1968

Background information
- Born: February 20, 1937; Rock Island, Illinois, U.S.
- Died: March 2, 1999 (aged 62) Los Angeles, California, U.S.
- Occupations: Singer-songwriter
- Labels: Elektra Records; Columbia Records
- Website: www.davidackles.com

David Thomas Ackles (February 20, 1937 – March 2, 1999) was an American singer-songwriter, pianist, and child actor. He recorded four albums between 1968 and 1973.

Describing Ackles' style in 2003, critic Colin McElligatt wrote, "An unlikely clash of anachronistic show business and modern-day lyricism...deeply informs his recorded output. Alternately calling to mind Hoagy Carmichael, Irving Berlin, Robbie Robertson, Tim Hardin, and Scott Walker, Ackles forged an utterly unique sound out of stray parts that comprise a whole that is as uncompromising as it is unrivaled."

Although he never gained wide commercial success, he influenced other artists, especially British singer-songwriters such as Elvis Costello, Elton John, and Phil Collins, all of whom declared themselves fans of Ackles. After Ackles' death Costello said, "It's a mystery to me why his wonderful songs are not better known."

== Early life ==
Ackles said of his birthplace, Rock Island, Illinois: "Not a bad place for an incipient songwriter to get a start." His mother came from a family of English music hall performers and his father was a musician. His family moved to Southern California, and Los Angeles became his lifelong home.

For a few years Ackles was a child actor, appearing in six of the eight films in Columbia Pictures' Rusty children's film series made from 1945 to 1949. He played the character "Peanuts" in the second film in the series (1946's The Return Of Rusty, directed by William Castle) and the uncredited role of Roger "Tuck" Worden in the last five.

His song "Family Band," on the American Gothic album, "has often been mistaken for a parody, but the story of singing hymns in church on a Sunday evening, 'when my dad played bass, my mom played the drums, and I played piano, and Jesus sang the song,'" was autobiographical. "I come from a very strong, almost doctrinaire Christian background, having been raised—God help me—a Presbyterian." he said. "He was a deeply religious and spiritual man," his wife said of him, "a privately spiritual man who did in fact take part in a community of the church, had a daily ritual of prayer." "[G]oing to church, thinking of things spiritually and having a close relationship with God was very important to him." She thought this may have added to his estrangement from the pop music business of the 1970s.

As children he and his sister performed vaudeville-style duets; they later "mutated" into a folk duo. "We sang the most obscure folk songs we could find. The more obscure they were, the more people liked them." He had known from childhood that he wanted to write songs and produce music, "But a recording artist? Not on your life!"

He studied English literature at the University of Southern California, spending his junior year at the University of Edinburgh, where he studied West Saxon. He earned a master's degree in Film Studies at USC. In 1997, when asked why he chose to major in English rather than music, he said, "I wanted to learn to do it all, which meant learning the construction of poetry, so I could write my own lyrics and play construction so that I could write the book to whatever musical I was creating. In the end, it in no way limited my horizons, being an English major. In fact it opened up the possibility to do so many things." His wife said, "His ultimate goal when he was younger was to write, produce, direct, design the sets, do the music, and star in his work. And he could have done it. That's where his heart was."

While working a string of rent-paying jobs after college—"private detective, security guard, and circus roustabout"—he was simultaneously composing "musicals, ballet scores, and choral pieces. These early experiences and enthusiasms were to leave a mark on his songwriting, and helped form a distinctively theatrical singing style."

== Starting music career ==
Ackles began his recording career as a staff songwriter for Jac Holzman at Elektra Records. None of the songs he wrote were right for any of Elektra's artists, and Holzman suggested that Ackles record his own work. His first album, the eponymous David Ackles (1968), did not achieve commercial success, even when reissued in 1971 as The Road to Cairo, but it was influential among singer-songwriters. It featured future members of the group Rhinoceros. This and his follow-up 1969 release, Subway to the Country, contained songs that melded strong theatrical influences with piano-based rock. His songs reflected the views of their character-narrators, many of whom were societal outcasts. In this way he presaged many of the songs of Bruce Springsteen and Steve Earle.

Subway to the Country was given a larger budget. At first he and Al Kooper tried recording the tracks in a "stripped-back country-rock style," then classically trained composer Fred Myrow was brought in to arrange and conduct. Twenty-two musicians are credited on the album. Now that Ackles could employ strings, winds, brass, and choruses, his elaborate musical style began to develop.

He toured with his songs when he had to, but in spite of his stage experience he was not a showman. His wife recalled that performing live "was very difficult for him....I just don't think he was comfortable being up there as David Ackles. If he was asked to go on and sing and play as Oscar Levant, it might have been easier for him. Any theater piece would have been fine. But to be out there just kind of exposing your soul, I think, was extremely difficult."

== American Gothic (1972) ==
American Gothic, released in 1972, was produced by Elton John's lyricist Bernie Taupin. Taupin and Ackles became acquainted when Ackles was selected to be the opening act for Elton John's 1970 American debut at the Troubadour in Los Angeles. Taupin said of Ackles' style, "There was nothing quite like it. It's been said so many times, but his stuff was sort of [like] Brecht and Weill, and theatrical. It was very different than what the other singer-songwriters of the time were doing. There was also a darkness to it, which I really, really loved, because that was the kind of material that I was drawn to."

Though the album was recorded and mixed in about two weeks, Ackles worked for two years on its conception and "immensely complex" orchestral arrangements. Of Ackles' four albums, it was the only one recorded in England rather than in America. He used musicians from the London Symphony and a Salvation Army band chorus ("'The only trouble is, it's not the same as the American Salvation Army, so they were elongating all their a's, and he kept saying, "No no no, you've got to get rid of that accent"'"). Elektra gave Ackles his biggest budget to date to complete the project and advertised it pre-release as "The Album of the Year." Elektra sent a pre-release copy to Chris Van Ness, the music editor of Los Angeles Free Press, who wrote an enthusiast review comparing it to The Beatles' Sgt. Pepper's Lonely Hearts Club Band. Elektra then sent a copy of the review to the press, whose reviews, including the Sgt. Pepper comparison, followed the lines of Van Ness's original. Melody Maker called it a classic and British music critic Derek Jewell of The Sunday Times described it as "the Sgt. Pepper of folk." But sales were again disappointing; it reached only #167 on the US charts. And Ackles himself felt he couldn't agree with Van Ness's "comparison to Sgt. Pepper" and his "overpraising".

== Later career ==
After three albums for Elektra, Ackles left the label. He was signed to CBS/Columbia Records by record executive Clive Davis, then president of the company and a long-time Ackles admirer. As he tried to create his first album for Columbia he felt the pressure of expectations engendered by American Gothic's glowing reviews. All too aware that his last album had been called "a milestone in pop and a study in excellence" and "a new direction in pop music" and himself "'an important artist whose work eludes categorisation,'" Ackles began to second-guess himself. "[E]very idea he came up with he discarded, thinking, 'This is not as good as American Gothic.'" He withdrew from the recording studio and produced Five & Dime at home on a four-track recorder. Uncharacteristically he brought in "a modest and simple record" on time and under budget. But before Five & Dime was released, Clive Davis was abruptly dismissed by CBS over an expenses dispute. With the loss of the only executive who had championed it, the new Ackles album fared poorly. It was perfunctorily released—the same month Davis was—only in the US, and Columbia would not finance a tour to promote it. Columbia did not renew his contract and Ackles, hurt and frustrated, did not search for another record deal.

== Personal life ==
After leaving Columbia Records in 1973, Ackles concentrated on fulfilling his publishing contract with Warner Bros., writing songs to order for the company's artists. As had been the case in Ackles's early Elektra days, none of the songs were recorded by the artists to whom they were pitched. He worked on musical theater and screenplays from the home base he shared with his wife and son, a six-acre horse farm in Tujunga, near Los Angeles. He sold some screenplays to television; one that was broadcast was Word of Honor (1981) starring Karl Malden and Ron Silver.

In 1981, his car was hit by a drunk driver. Ackles's left arm was nearly severed and his left thighbone "virtually pushed out through his back." He remembered his wife "standing outside the operating theater, shouting, 'Don't cut off his arm! He's a piano player!'" He spent six months in a wheelchair, eventually receiving a steel hip. Though by 1984 he was able to play piano for short periods, his arm's nerves never recovered, and he "may have been in considerable pain for the rest of his life."

In the 1980s he returned to USC, first in administration, then teaching musical theater. At USC in 1997 he directed productions of Good News and The Threepenny Opera, and in the 1990s completed Sister Aimee, a musical based on the life of Aimee Semple McPherson, which was performed in Los Angeles in 1995 and in Chicago in 2004. He and Rob Dickins of Warner Music UK discussed recording Sister Aimee. He was the executive director of the Los Angeles chapter of the National Society of Fund-Raising Executives (now the National Association of Fundraising Professionals) and was a part of the BMI Lehman Engel Musical Theatre Workshop in Los Angeles (now the Academy of New Musical Theatre).

Ackles died of lung cancer on March 2, 1999, at the age of 62.

== Legacy ==
When Elvis Costello was inducted into the Rock and Roll Hall of Fame in 2003, he cited Ackles in his speech as one of his major influences. In the November 2000 issue of Vanity Fair magazine, Costello identified two of Ackles's albums among his "500 Greatest Albums Ever," describing Ackles as "perhaps the greatest unheralded songwriter of the late 60s."

When Phil Collins was on the British BBC Radio show Desert Island Discs, he selected Ackles's song "Down River" as one of his eight all-time favorite songs. He said of Ackles: "He taught me that writing songs didn’t have to be moon/spoon/June. That you could write intelligently about more serious subjects."

Elton John and Elvis Costello chose "Down River" to perform as their first-ever duet together for the finale of the premiere episode of Costello's TV series Spectacle: Elvis Costello with....

Interviewed in 1990 for the booklet accompanying his To Be Continued retrospective box-set, Elton John recalled his incredulity when he discovered that Ackles had been selected to be his co-headlining opening act for his American debut at the Troubadour club in Los Angeles in August 1970. "I could not believe that I was on the same stage with someone like David Ackles who opened for me at the Troubadour. David Ackles was one of my heroes."

At the Troubadour John made a point of watching Ackles play every night. He was "flabbergasted" to discover that Ackles was far better known in England than in the United States, or even L.A. He dedicated 1970's Tumbleweed Connection to Ackles with the line, "to David with love." Almost thirty years later, though Ackles had not recorded since 1973, John said, "He's one of the best America has to offer."

Ackles's songs were occasionally played by others. In 1968, Julie Driscoll & the Brian Auger Trinity had a minor UK hit with Ackles's song "Road to Cairo." This song was also recorded by Howard Jones in 1990 on Elektra Records' compilation Rubáiyát. Martin Carthy performed "His Name is Andrew," on the 1971 album Landfall, and Spooky Tooth's 1970 album The Last Puff included their version of "Down River," which the Hollies also released in 1972 on their album Romany. Harry Belafonte recorded a cover of "Subway to the Country" for the album Harry & Lena (1970).

His first three albums were reissued in 1994 and again in 2000. The 1994 Elektra reissues generated modest sales and a number of praise-filled articles, which raised hopes that Ackles was on the verge of a new career as a rediscovered cult favorite. Not long before his death in 1999, there was a resurgence of interest in the UK.

After his death, there were obituaries in several major British newspapers that eulogized Ackles's talent.

In 2007, Elektra UK prepared a 2 CD set, called There Is A River: The Elektra Recordings that contained the entirety of his first three albums plus seven unreleased songs and two singles versions, and liner notes from Elvis Costello and Bernie Taupin. They went so far as to release advance 2 CD-R promo sets with cover artwork. But, as it states at Discogs, "This release was scheduled for 2007-06 but only made it as far as the test pressing (and promo) stage before being cancelled due to legal conflicts with Ackles' estate."

== Discography ==
- David Ackles (Elektra Records, September 1968)
- Subway to the Country (Elektra Records, January 1970)
- American Gothic (Elektra Records, July 1972)
- Five & Dime (Columbia Records, October 1973)
