= Alan Gerber =

American singer-songwriter

- Genres: rock, blues, folk, jazz
- Instrument: Multi-instrumentalist
- Years active: 1960s–present
- Label: CashBox
- Website: www.alangerber.org/default.shtml

Alan Gerber is an American-born singer, songwriter, and multi-instrumentalist. He is a member of the recently reunited rock band Rhinoceros and also has been pursuing a solo career throughout the last 30 years. His style shows multiple influences (blues, folk, jazz), and he is especially known for his high-energy performances and light-hearted, humor-filled lyrics.

== Life and career ==
Alan Gerber was born and raised in Chicago, Illinois, May 27, 1947. In 1963, at age 15, he recorded his first '45 record for the label Earic. He studied music at Roosevelt University but left before completing his degree, unhappy with the formal way music was presented and taught at the time. At age 18, he moved to Los Angeles, California, where he was involved in the formation of the band Rhinoceros, in which he was a keyboardist, vocalist and primary songwriter.

He left Rhinoceros in 1969 and started his solo career shortly after that. His first album, The Alan Gerber Album, was released in 1971. He subsequently moved to Canada and currently lives in Val-David, Quebec. He is a Canadian/American dual citizen. He was involved in a variety of projects throughout the late 1970s and 1980s, such as the Bob Dylan movie Renaldo and Clara, but did not record albums during this period. His productivity as a recording and performing artist has enjoyed a renewal since 1994 and the release of Chicken Walk.

He has composed, recorded, produced and released 5 more albums to date, including a live recording on which he played all the instruments. He is almost constantly touring in North America and Europe, sometimes joined by his son Eli and daughter Hannah, who also appear on his 2009 album, Queen of Hearts. His live performances draw favourable reviews, with one commentator for instance stating that "You can tell he loves to be in front of an audience and truly whips them into a frenzy." (Holger Petersen, host of Saturday Night Blues on CBC). He has participated in the Montreal Jazz Festival, the Ottawa Bluesfest, and the Carcassonne (France) Music Festival, among many others. As of 2009, he was signed with the CashBox Records label.

== Solo albums ==
Year	Title	Notes
1971	The Alan Gerber Album	
1994	Chicken Walk	
1997	Fools That Try	
1999	The Boogie Man	
2002	Alan Gerber Live	
2005	Blue Tube	
2009	Queen of Hearts	
2013	The Grand ...and the Small	
