= Bobby Kris & The Imperials =

Canadian folk-rock band

- Also known as: J.S & The Imperials
- Origin: Toronto, Ontario, Canada
- Genres: Folk, rock
- Years active: 1963–1967
- Past members: Jim Snowdon; Pat Riccio Jr; Marty Fisher; Al Waugh; Brian Sefchek; Jerry Shymanski; John Crone; Gordon MacBain; Gene Martynec; Rick Haynes; Bobby Kris; Dave Konvalinka; Rick Loth; Wayne Davis; Jimmy Oskirko

Bobby Kris & The Imperials were a 1960s Toronto folk-rock band, that had a local hit with Burt Bacharach and Hal David's "Walk On By".

== Origins ==
The band was originally called J.S. & The Imperials and was led by singer Jim Snowdon and featured pianist Pat Riccio Jr., who was replaced in 1964 by Marty Fisher. The other original members were guitarist Al Waugh, bass player Brian Sefchek, saxophone players Jerry Shymanski (aka Mann) and John Crone, and drummer Gordon MacBain. During the early part of 1965, the group underwent further changes in personnel, which saw Gene Martynec replace Waugh and Rick Haynes replace Sefchek.

== Band becomes Bobby Kris & The Imperials ==
Around May 1965, the group changed its name when Bobby Kris (real name: Bob Burrows), who was studying philosophy at the University of Toronto, joined as lead vocalist. (The band had offered the role to Jay Smith of The Majestics but he declined.)

Dave Konvalinka, aka Dave Wayne, succeeded Haynes on bass; Rick Loth came in on saxophone to replace Crone who left to join The Majestics. Haynes later played with Gordon Lightfoot. One of the new line up's first shows was at the Purple Candle Club in Wasaga Beach on August 7, 1965.

The group's debut single, a cover of Burt Bacharach and Hal David's Walk On By was released in November 1965 and reached No. 8 on Canada's RPM chart early the following year. The follow-up 45, a Bob Dylan cover of She Belongs To Me, was not as successful. The group also did an orange juice commercial, which was never released.

In early 1966, the group opened for Wilson Pickett at Toronto's Masonic Temple (when Jimi Hendrix was his guitarist) and supported The Beach Boys in Port Arthur (now Thunder Bay).

== Working with the ballet ==
In a surprising coupling, the band appeared at the O'Keefe Centre on April 13, 1966, with the Canadian National Ballet Company, playing in the lobby during the intermission.

Bobby Kris & The Imperials were chosen as opening act for The Lovin' Spoonful at Toronto's Massey Hall on May 8, 1966. Shortly afterwards, Wayne Davis (born April 28, 1946, in Toronto) from The Just Us replaced Dave Wayne who left to join The Majestics. Loth and Shymanski also left at this point. Loth then later joined the Silhouettes led by Doug Reilly (Dr. Music).

The new line-up continued to play extensively in the Toronto area, although no other singles appeared. They were one of 14 local groups to play at a 14-hour pop show at the Maple Leaf Gardens in Toronto on September 24, 1966. The following month, former member Jerry Shymanski joined Eddie Spencer & The Power, which evolved into Grant Smith & The Power.

Bobby Kris & The Imperials supported Sam the Sham & The Pharaohs at the Club Kingsway in Toronto on October 22, 1966, alongside The Ugly Ducklings and The Ardels.

== The group fragments ==
In the spring of 1967, the band started to fragment. Martynec left to form Kensington Market in May and was replaced by former Majestics keyboard player Jimmy Oskirko. The new lineup started to experiment more and played regularly at the Concord Tavern where the band performed a cover of The Beatles' "A Day in the Life". This version of the group also opened for Jose Feliciano at Massey Hall.

However, by September, it was all over. Fisher and MacBain left to join Bruce Cockburn's Flying Circus. Kris replaced Jimmy Livingston in Livingston's Journey in late October while Davis subsequently joined 3's a Crowd in December.

== Bobby Kris reformed the band ==
Bobby Kris reformed the band in mid-1968 with MacBain, Oskirko, Davis and former Jon and Lee & The Checkmates guitarist Larry Leishman (born April 4, 1947, Dunfermline, Scotland). One of the reconstituted band's first dates was at the Night Owl on June 13–14, 1968. The new look group played for another year but after appearing at the Night Owl on June 19–21, 1969, the band finally imploded.

Leishman subsequently played with Rhinoceros while MacBain joined Peter Quaife's post-Kinks band, Mapleoak in England.

== Discography ==
- Single: "Walk On By" c/w "Travelling Bag" (Columbia 2672) 1965 [#8 CAN]
- Single: "She Belongs To Me" c/w "A Year From Today" (Columbia 2687) 1966
- EP: Bobby Kris... Now (Willow Music) December 1995
