= Neil Merryweather =

Canadian musician (1945–2021)

- Also known as: Bobby Neilson; Neil Lillie
- Born: Robert Neilson Lillie; December 27, 1945; Winnipeg, Manitoba, Canada
- Origin: Toronto, Ontario, Canada
- Died: March 28, 2021 (aged 75) Las Vegas, Nevada
- Genre: Rock
- Occupations: Musician; songwriter
- Instruments: Vocals; bass
- Years active: 1965–2021
- Formerly of: The Just Us, the Mynah Birds, the Flying Circus, Merryweather, Mama Lion

Neil Merryweather (born Robert Neilson Lillie; December 27, 1945 – March 28, 2021) was a Canadian rock singer, bass player and songwriter.

== Biography ==
Merryweather was born in Winnipeg, Manitoba. He began his career in Toronto in the early 1960s, performing under the name Bobby Neilson, and then Neil Lillie. He played in bands such as Just Us, the Tripp, the Mynah Birds (including Rick James), and the Flying Circus (including Bruce Cockburn. He left the Flying Circus in March 1968, and reunited with former Tripp members Ed Roth and Jimmy Livingston to form a new band. Adding guitarist Dave Burt, formerly in the Fraser Loveman Group, and drummer Gary Hall, the new group was initially dubbed 'New King Boiler'.

Merryweather's second album, Word of Mouth (released in September 1969), was a double album recorded in Los Angeles featuring the band with Steve Miller, Barry Goldberg, Charlie Musselwhite, Dave Mason, Howard Roberts and Bobby Notkoff. The group fragmented, with Merryweather quitting after a dispute. Merryweather turned down an offer from Stephen Stills to join Crosby, Stills, Nash & Young as bass player. Word of Mouth peaked at #199 on the United States Billboard 200 album chart.

Merryweather flew back to Toronto to recruit replacements, then returned with them to record the album Neil Merryweather, John Richardson and Boers for the blues label Kent in early 1970. The resulting album was credited to Merryweather, former Ugly Ducklings drummer Robin Boers, guitarist John Richardson from Nucleus (and before that Lords of London), and ex-49th Parallel member J.J. Velker. Merryweather agreed to do the album for the money to support the new band. They did a follow-up album for RCA, Ivar Avenue Reunion, featuring the same basic group plus Goldberg, Musselwhite, and Merryweather's new girlfriend, ex-C.K. Strong singer Lynn Carey.

Merryweather and Lynn Carey, along with guitarist Kal David and former Merryweather bandmates Roth and Hall, recorded the Vacuum Cleaner album for RCA in 1971. Two tracks that they recorded at Kent Records under the name "Momma and Pappa Rock'n Family" (Kent 4522) were bought by RCA, also found their way onto the Vacuum Cleaner album. Merryweather found the replacement staff to be weak and he left with the idea to form a new group with Lynn out front. Merryweather recruited Coffi Hall as drummer and found guitarist Rick Gaxiola and keyboardist James Newton Howard. Merryweather had put together a new hard rock band which he named Mama Lion in 1972, featuring Carey on lead vocals.

In 1974, Merryweather put a new band together called the Space Rangers. Through friend Morey Lathower (VP of A&R at Capitol), he was able to secure time at Capitol Records studios and in two nights he recorded the Space Rangers album. Merryweather's manager and executive producer Jim Taylor got a deal with Mercury Records and Merryweather was signed. Merryweather bought a Chamberlin keyboard from Sonny & Cher. The band was booked into the Whiskey when the Space Rangers album was released in 1974. Merryweather took the band into Village Recorders and, in five days, produced his second album for Mercury, called Kryptonite. The label released it in 1975.

In 2015, he made a guest appearance on the Volume Three album by Janne Stark's Mountain of Power. He sang on the tracks "Hey Serena/Wheel of Fortune Turning". On the album, Stark also covered Merryweather's songs "Give It Everything We Got/Kryptonite". The album was released on Grooveyard Records. In 2016, they started working on an album under the name Merryweather Stark. The album Carved in Rock was released on CD and double vinyl by GMR Music in 2018.

In 2020, Merryweather Stark released their second album Rock Solid (GMR Music) on CD and LP. Neil also participated on the Volume Four album by Stark's Mountain of Power, where he sang on the songs "In My Eyes" (originally by Three Man Army) and "Sweet Wealth" (originally by the band Rockicks). Late 2020, Swedish label Regain Records started working on re-issuing Neil's Kryptonite and Space Rangers albums. They were re-mastered by Janne Stark, who also mixed the bonus tracks featured on the releases.

While recording the Rock Solid album in 2019, Merryweather and Stark visited the Skeleton Key studios in Las Vegas and teamed up with drummer John Wackerman. The trio wrote and recorded the basic tracks for the album Cosmic Affect in just three days. The album was not released until November 11, 2022, on Metalville Records.

Merryweather died in Las Vegas, Nevada, on March 29, 2021, after a short illness.

== Discography ==
- Merryweather (with Merryweather) (Capitol, 1969)
- Word of Mouth (with Merryweather) (Capitol, 1969)
- Neil Merryweather, John Richardson and Boers (Kent, 1970)
- Ivar Avenue Reunion (with Barry Goldberg, Charlie Musselwhite, Lynn Carey) (RCA, 1970)
- Vacuum Cleaner (with Lynn Carey) (RCA, 1971)
- Preserve Wildlife (with Mama Lion) (Family Productions, 1972)
- Heavy Cruiser (with Heavy Cruiser) (Family Productions, 1972)
- Lucky Dog (with Heavy Cruiser) (Family Productions, 1973)
- Give It Everything I've Got (with Mama Lion) (Family Productions, 1973)
- Space Rangers (Mercury, 1974) – Neil Merryweather, bass and vocals; Tim McGovern, drums; Timo Laine, guitar; Michael "Jeep" Willis, guitar; Robert Silvert, Chamberlin and synthesizer; "Edgemont", synthesizer patches
- Kryptonite (with Space Rangers) (Mercury, 1975) – Neil Merryweather, bass and vocals; Michael "Jeep" Willis, lead guitar; James Herndon, Chamberlin, synthesizer, guitar and slide guitar; Tim McGovern, drums and guitar
- Differences (1978)
- Radical Genes (with Eyes) (1980)
- Hundred Watt Head (with Hundred Watt Head) (2009)
- The La La Land Blues Band (with The La La Land Blues Band) (2009)
- Carved in Rock (with Merryweather Stark) (2018)
- Neil Merryweather and Hundred Watt Head Too (with Hundred Watt Head) (2019)
- Red (with Hundred Watt Head) (2019)
- Rock Solid (with Merryweather Stark) (2020)
- Cosmic Affect (with Merryweather Stark Wackerman) (2022)
