= Lynn Carey =

American singer-songwriter

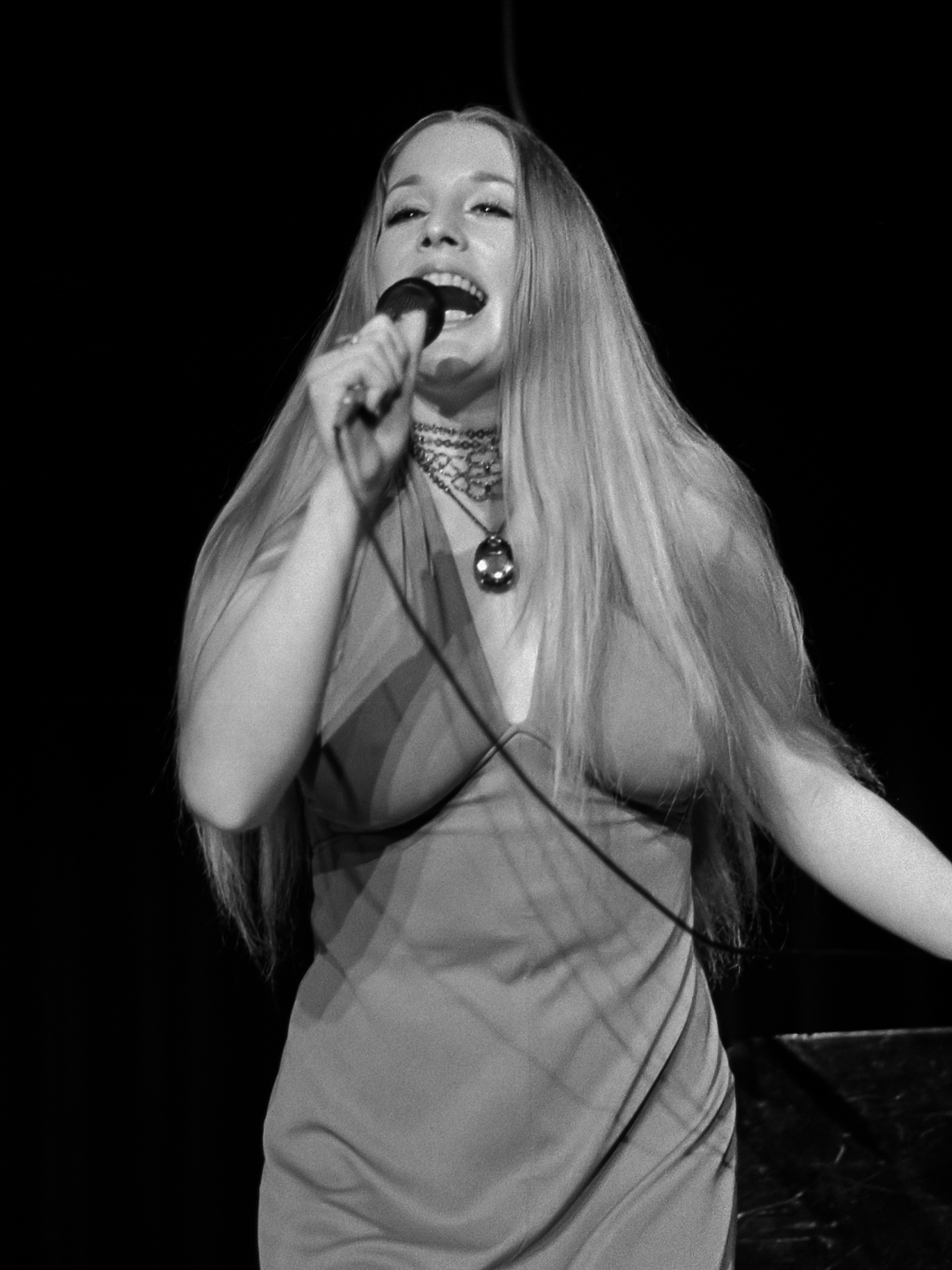
- Lynn Carey (1972)

Background information
- Born: Lynn Catherine Carey; October 29, 1946 (age 79)
- Origin: Los Angeles, California, United States
- Genres: Pop; Rock; Jazz
- Occupations: Singer; Songwriter; Model; Actress
- Formerly of: Mama Lion

Lynn Catherine Carey (born October 29, 1946) is an American singer, songwriter, model, and actress best known as the lead vocalist in the band Mama Lion.

== Biography ==
Born in Los Angeles, California, Carey is the daughter of actor Macdonald Carey. She began her career as a teen model and actress appearing in the 1966 cult film Lord Love a Duck as well as several guest slots on the T.V. shows Lassie, The Man from U.N.C.L.E., Run for Your Life, The Donna Reed Show and The Wild Wild West.

== Discography ==
C.K. Strong (with Jefferson Kewley)

- C.K. Strong (Epic BN-26473, 1969)

Ivar Avenue Reunion

- Ivar Avenue Reunion (RCA LSP-4442, 1970)

Merryweather & Carey (with Neil Merryweather)

- Vacuum Cleaner (RCA LSP-4485, 1971)

Heavy Cruiser (with Neil Merryweather)

- Heavy Cruiser (Family Productions FPS-2706, 1972)
- Lucky Dog (Family Productions FPS-2712, 1973)

Mama Lion

- Preserve Wildlife (Family Productions FPS-2702, 1972)
- Give It Everything I've Got (Family Productions FPS-2713, 1973)

Lynn Carey / Mama Lion

- Good Times! (Big Blonde BB-1001, 1984)
- Mama Lion... Roars Back! (Music Unlimited SRM-292, 2001)

=== Soundtrack ===
- Stu Phillips – Beyond The Valley Of The Dolls - The Original Soundtrack - 2004 - with the original film songs, Lynn Carey and Barbara "Sandi" Robison sing as bonus tracks. (CD + LP) Released by Soundtrack Classics - SCL 1408 and Harkit Records - HRKCD 8032.
