= Jon and Lee & the Checkmates =

- Also known as: Lee Jackson and The Checkmates; Jon-Lee Group
- Origin: Toronto, Canada
- Genres: R&B
- Years active: 1962–1967, 1999–present
- Label: ABC
- Spinoffs: Rhinoceros, Jay Smith & The Majestics
- Spinoff of: The Stereos, The Silvertones, The Tempests
- Members: Larry Leishman; Peter Hodgson; John Finley
- Past members: Michael Fonfara; Lee Jackson; Paul Carrier; Dave McDeavitt; Al D'Orsay; Hilmar Hajek; Dave Brown; Wes Morris; Jeff Cutler; David Clayton-Thomas

Jon and Lee & the Checkmates are a Canadian music group, best known for containing future members of Elektra band Rhinoceros. Together with Mandala, they spearheaded Toronto's R&B scene during the mid-1960s. As the Jon-Lee Group, the band released a lone single for ABC Records before splitting up in September 1967. The group has more recently reformed, released its debut album in late 2006.

== High school origins ==
Lee Jackson and The Checkmates, formed at a Toronto high school during 1962 out of the remains of the Stereos, initially consisted of singer Michael Ferry (Lee Jackson), guitarist Al D'Orsay, bass player Dave McDeavitt, drummer Paul Carrier and saxophone player Hilmar Hajek.

In late 1963, D'Orsay introduced classically trained pianist Michael Fonfara, who was responsible for bringing in a second lead guitarist, Larry Leishman.

Leishman's arrival signaled a major upheaval in the band's line up, as D'Orsay departed and Leishman's former compatriot from the Silvertones and the Tempests, Peter Hodgson (born April 16, 1946, Toronto), succeeded McDeavitt on bass. Soon afterwards, the two new recruits (together with Fonfara) lobbied for the inclusion of another former Tempest, singer John Finley (born May 6, 1945, Toronto), whose recruitment in mid-1964 prompted a name change to Jon and Lee & The Checkmates.

Throughout that year, the group also went through a succession of drummers as Dave Brown, who had come in for Carrier, left to join Jay Smith & The Majestics, and was replaced by Wes Morris. By the end of the year, however, Morris had moved on to join The Majestics and former commercial artist Jeff Cutler (born Rowland Jeffries Cutler, September 8, 1941, Toronto) completed the classic line up.

== 1965: establishing their act ==
Jon and Lee & The Checkmates stamped their authority on the local scene with a performance at Toronto's Massey Hall in early 1965. The exposure from the performance aroused the interest of Afro-American émigré Eddie "Duke" Edwards and Bigland music agency entrepreneur, the late Ron Scribner, who both became involved with the group's career. Edwards, a graduate of the Boston Conservatory, helped arrange material for The Checkmates as well as co-managing them.

Another significant person in the audience, Cecil Farrell, proprietor at a Niagara Falls newspaper and AP correspondent, hired the band for his 16-year-old daughter's birthday party, where the group was introduced to Leo Pillott, director of public relations for the ABC-TV network. After hearing sample tapes, Pillott offered to represent the group and arranged a series of major network television appearances; they would never come to pass.

Meanwhile, Jon and Lee & The Checkmates, along with several local artists, were due to open for The Rolling Stones at Maple Leaf Gardens on April 25. However, the organizers booked too many groups and the band never got to play. For the next few months, Jon and Lee & The Checkmates found regular work on the local dance hall/teen club circuit and at the Devil's Den club which had become the band's home.

Later in the summer came news the US Immigration and Naturalization Service had vetoed the television bookings. Finally later in the year, Pillott and Farrell would be able to overcome the Immigration issue and book the band into the famous Peppermint Lounge for December.

On September 13, the group joined local pop singer Bobby Curtola and others in opening Toronto's new city hall in Nathan Phillips Square. The exposure landed the band the opening slot at The Rolling Stones show at Maple Leaf Gardens on October 31, 1965. The following month, several US record labels, including Decca, Elektra, Motown and RCA approached the band with offers. Jon and Lee & The Checkmates recorded a few tracks in Toronto for RCA in November, but the results were disappointing.

Shortly after a show at the Hawk's Nest on December 10, the group headed to New York to play at the Peppermint Lounge engagement and record three tracks for Decca (though again, the results were unsuccessful).

== 1966: recovering from setbacks ==
Unable to record, Jon and Lee & The Checkmates concentrated on extending their fan base beyond southern Ontario into the northern United States, establishing pockets of support in New York and Philadelphia. In New York, they followed their engagement at the Peppermint Lounge with 2 weeks at the Phone Booth (early February 1966). In June, they appeared on a concert bill at Shea Stadium with The Temptations, The Chiffons and Junior Walker & the All Stars.

Throughout 1966, the band also consolidated its Toronto following, holding down a residency at the Avenue Road Club, and appearing at other notable venues such as the Broom and Stone, the Gogue Inn and the Hawk's Nest.

In the fall, while in New York again, an important production deal was struck with B.B.& D. Productions [Daniel Secunda (cousin of Procol Harum's manager Tony Secunda), Billy Barberis and Bobby Weinstein]. The initial agreement called for the recording of 4 sides in late winter-early spring of 1967.

== 1967: the Jon-Lee Group ==
In the early months of 1967, Jon and Lee & The Checkmates increasingly spent time in New York and Philadelphia, only returning to Toronto intermittently to play shows.

It was at this time, the trio of Secunda, Barberis and Weinstein took the band into the studio to record the four sides, which were later leased to ABC Records to coincide with a show at Steve Paul's The Scene.

A cover of John Sebastian's "Girl, Beautiful Girl", (to have been the band's debut single) was put aside in favor of "Bring It Down Front", written by Nashville hit songwriter, Eddie Reeves and Bobby Weinstein (Teddy Randazzo co-writer of Little Anthony hits), b/w the Duke Edwards' instrumental "Pork Chops". Issued during July, "Bring It Down Front" failed to chart in the US but was a hit back home in Canada on Sparton Records, reaching #10 on the Toronto CHUM chart in August, and #23 on the national RPM chart in October. The band soon began to unravel, unable to come up with the needed original material for an album as requested by B.B.& D. They played their final show in Philadelphia on September 16, 1967.

== Falling apart ==
Jackson, who had lost interest in being a singer, left the band to work initially as a road manager for Bruce Cockburn's new group, The Flying Circus. He then became a promoter under his real name, Michael Ferry. Finley also left to reassess his musical future, leaving the remaining members to travel to New York with future Blood, Sweat & Tears singer David Clayton-Thomas and perform at The Scene.

Billed as David Clayton-Thomas & The Phoenix, the group performed at least one set of shows (from October 19–22) before Thomas was deported back to Toronto for being an illegal immigrant.

== Aftermath ==
Finley and Fonfara went on to become founding members of Rhinoceros in early 1968; Hodgson joined in April 1969, with Edwards and Leishman being recruited later in August.

Jeff Cutler, who also remained in New York, later joined The Crazy World of Arthur Brown for its second US tour in May 1968 and then worked with The Holy Modal Rounders.

== The Checkmates return ==
In 1999, Michael Fonfara, Peter Hodgson and Larry Leishman reformed The Checkmates for live dates in Toronto. In 2005, John Finley rejoined the band and the group released their debut album in 2006.

== Personnel ==
Current members

- Larry Leishman - guitar (1963–1967, 1999–present)
- Peter Hodgson - bass (1963–1967, 1999–present)
- John Finley - vocals (1963–1967, 2005–present)

Former members

- Michael Fonfara - piano (1963–1967, 1999–2021; his death)
- Lee Jackson - vocals (1962–1967)
- Paul Carrier - drums (1962–1963)
- Dave McDeavitt - bass (1962–1963)
- Al D'Orsay - guitar (1962–1963)
- Hilmar Hajek - saxophone (1962–1967)
- Dave Brown - drums (1963)
- Wes Morris - drums (1963)
- Jeff Cutler - drums (1963)
- David Clayton-Thomas - vocals (1967)

== Discography ==
- "Bring It Down Front" / "Pork Chops" - (Sparton P1617) - 1967

== Sources ==
- John Finley, interviews with Bill Munson, 1978 and Nick Warburton
- Michael Ferry, interview with Bill Munson, 1978
- Peter Hodgson, interview Nick Warburton
- Larry Leishman, interviews with Bill Munson, 1978 and Nick Warburton
- Michael Fonfara, interview with Nick Warburton
- Rhinoceros-group.com
- The Toronto Telegram's After Four section on Thursdays listed live dates in the city
