= Larry Leishman =

Canadian musician (1947–2013)

- Born: April 4, 1947; Dunfermline, Scotland
- Origin: Toronto, Canada
- Died: March 4, 2013 (aged 65)
- Genres: R&B
- Occupation: Musician
- Instrument: Guitar
- Formerly of: Jon and Lee & The Checkmates; Bobby Kris & The Imperials; The Duke Edwards Cycle; Rhinoceros

Larry Leishman (April 4, 1947 in Dunfermline, Scotland – March 4, 2013) was a Canadian guitarist who was a member of Toronto R&B outfit, Jon and Lee & The Checkmates during the mid 1960s. When the band broke up in September 1967, he briefly worked with David Clayton-Thomas and various Toronto bands, including Bobby Kris & The Imperials and The Duke Edwards Cycle before joining Rhinoceros in August 1969.
