= John Finley (musician) =

Canadian singer-songwriter (born 1945)

- Origin: Toronto, Ontario, Canada
- Genres: Soul, Gospel, Rock, R&B
- Years active: 1963–present
- Formerly of: Jon and Lee & the Checkmates

John Finley (born May 6, 1945) is a Canadian singer-songwriter who came to prominence with Toronto R&B band Jon and Lee & the Checkmates and later with the Elektra supergroup Rhinoceros.

Finley's talents reach over many genres, including R&B, Gospel, Jazz and Rock, and is acclaimed for his song writing, recording and live performances. After Rhinoceros, Finley was a member of Blackstone before engaging in projects with Homestead and Michael Quatro. Finley has worked with the reformed band The Checkmates, and a contemporary jazz and R&B group, SoulBop!. He currently leads his own band in Toronto, Ontario, and released "Soul Singer" in 2020.

== Musical career ==
In 1964, Finley joined Toronto-based band The Checkmates with the help of Peter Hodgson, the band's bass player and Finley's cousin. With Finley's inclusion, the band was renamed Jon and Lee and The Checkmates. After initial success, the band signed a contract with large RCA, despite Finley's connection with Elektra producer Paul Rothchild, who would eventually recruit Finley to Rhinoceros.

The band struggled to capture their live dynamic in the studio, and eventually relocated to Philadelphia to pursue more original material under the new band name the Jon-Lee Group. The band experienced mixed success, releasing "Bring It Down Front/Pork Chops" in 1967, before splitting the same year. Finley recalls that the band split due to production pressure from Secunda and personal differences that were exacerbated by drug taking.

In 1999, Michael Fonfara, Peter Hodgson and Larry Leishman reformed The Checkmates, and Finley connects with the band from time to time. The band is currently working on a new album.

In December 1967, with help again from Peter Hodgson, Finley joined Paul Rothchild's project super group that became known as Rhinoceros. According to Finley, when the band "listened to the tapes and they sounded just like a rhinoceros. The bass and the drums sounded lumbering and fat."

Finley recalls that Elektra Records "had this multi-thousand dollar campaign to make us instant mini-rock stars - you just go through a change, but by living together and jamming together the hype goes away." Despite heavy promotion, the three albums by Rhinoceros resulted in lacklustre sales.

Rhinoceros disbanded in 1971, and Finley believes that it was precipitated by two poor decisions. Firstly, the move from the West Coast to the East Coast severed the band's roots that lead to instability. Secondly, the band's decision to fire Paul Rothchild, despite Finley's objections, resulted in further instability and ultimately disintegration.
In early 1972, Finley recorded with Homestead on Nimbus 9 Records to produce the album Every Little Thing Has A Place In God's Heart, featuring the singles "Anthem" and "Every Little Thing". Finley also joined with Michael Quatro, and performed vocals on his album Paintings.

In 1972, Finley joined four ex-Rhinoceros members to launch the new band Blackstone Rangers (which was later shortened to Blackstone after a dispute with a motorcycle gang of the same name). Finley invited his old friend Paul Rothchild to Toronto to produce the album, which ultimately resulted in GRT Records album On The Line. Shortly after, the group disbanded.

In 1973, Three Dog Night's "Let Me Serenade You", a cover of Finley's "I Will Serenade You", became a US top 20 hit. In subsequent years, Finley concentrated on studio work and song writing, while increasing his involvement in the Los Angeles choir scene.

In 1990, Ivan Neville covered Finley's song "'Why Can't I Fall In Love?" for the movie soundtrack Pump Up the Volume.

In 2002, Finley also contributed vocals and piano to the Northern Blues Gospel Allstars on their album Saved.

Finley is currently leading his own contemporary jazz and R&B group, "SoulBop!". Their first recording contains original material as well as new arrangements of older songs, including the 1926 classic "Blue Skies". Live performances by SoulBop!, as well as solo appearances, still continue in the Toronto area.

In 2020, Finley signed a deal with Vesuvius Music Inc. and released an album (arranged and produced by Lou Pomanti) called "Soul Singer". The album features eleven tracks, most of them originals - that go from jazz to blues, soul to funk, gospel to pop. The album received international radio play and rave reviews. He continues to record and perform and is based in a small town, living just steps away from one of Ontario's largest waterfalls, near Toronto.
