= Evolution: The Best of Iron Butterfly =

Compilation album by Iron Butterfly
- Released: November 22, 1971
- Recorded: 1967–1970
- Genre: Rock
- Length: 39:23
- Label: Atco
- Producer: Brian Stone, Charles Greene, Jim Hilton, Richard Podolor

Iron Butterfly chronology
| Metamorphosis (1970) | Evolution: The Best of Iron Butterfly (1971) | Scorching Beauty (1975) |

Evolution: The Best of Iron Butterfly is the fifth and first greatest hits album released in 1971 by American rock band Iron Butterfly. Songs come from four of their albums: Heavy, In-A-Gadda-Da-Vida, Ball and Metamorphosis.

== Track listing ==
=== Side one ===
1. "Iron Butterfly Theme" (Doug Ingle) – 4:34
2. "Possession" (Ingle) – 2:41
3. "Unconscious Power" (Ingle, Danny Weis, Ron Bushy) – 2:29
4. "Flowers and Beads" (Ingle) - 3:05
5. "Termination" (Erik Brann, Lee Dorman) - 2:50
6. "In-A-Gadda-Da-Vida" (45 RPM single edit) (Ingle) – 3:10

=== Side two ===
1. "Soul Experience" (Ingle, Bushy, Brann, Dorman) – 2:50
2. "Stone Believer" (Ingle, Bushy, Dorman) – 5:20
3. "Belda-Beast" (Brann) – 5:46
4. "Easy Rider (Let the Wind Pay the Way)" (Ingle, Bushy, Dorman, Robert Woods Edmonson) – 3:06
5. "Slower Than Guns" (Ingle, Bushy, Dorman, Edmonson) – 3:37

== Charts ==
| Chart (1972) | Peak position |
|---|---|
| Australia (Kent Music Report) | 37 |

== Band members ==
- Doug Ingle – lead vocals (except where indicated), organs
- Ron Bushy – drums
- Jerry Penrod – bass on side 1 tracks 1–3
- Darryl DeLoach – tambourine and backing vocals on side 1 tracks 1–3
- Danny Weis – guitars on side 1 tracks 1–3
- Erik Brann – guitars on side 1 tracks 4–6 and side 2 tracks 1 and 3, lead vocals on "Termination" and "Belda-Beast"
- Lee Dorman – bass and backing vocals on side 1 tracks 4–6 and side 2 all tracks
- Mike Pinera – guitar on side 2 tracks 2, 4 and 5, additional lead vocal on "Stone Believer"
- Larry "Rhino" Reinhardt – guitar on side 2 tracks 2, 4 and 5
