= Fillmore East 1968 =

Live album by Iron Butterfly
- Released: 17 October 2011
- Recorded: 26 and 27 April 1968
- Venue: Fillmore East, New York City
- Genre: Rock
- Length: 110:00
- Label: Rhino
- Producer: Steve Woolard

Fillmore East 1968 is a live double album by Iron Butterfly, released on 17 October 2011 by Rhino Entertainment. It was recorded on 26 and 27 April 1968 in Fillmore East in New York City. The albums featured songs from their first album Heavy and three songs from second album In-A-Gadda-Da-Vida (released three months after these concerts). In addition, an early version of "Her Favorite Style" (From Ball) was performed on the second night.

== Track listing ==
All tracks composed by Doug Ingle; except where indicated

Disc 1

1. "Fields of Sun" (Ingle, Darryl DeLoach) – (4:01)
2. "You Can't Win" (Danny Weis, DeLoach) – (3:13)
3. "Unconscious Power" (Weis, Ingle, Ron Bushy) – (3:04)
4. "Are You Happy" (4:14)
5. "So-Lo" (Ingle, DeLoach) – (4:02)
6. "Iron Butterfly Theme" (4:26)
7. "Stamped Ideas" (Ingle, DeLoach) – (3:11)
8. "In-A-Gadda-Da-Vida" (17:11)
9. "So-Lo" (Ingle, DeLoach) – (4:00)
10. "Iron Butterfly Theme" (5:00)

Tracks 1–6 First Show April 26, 1968, Tracks 7–10 Second Show.

Disc 2

1. "Are You Happy" (4:27)
2. "Unconscious Power" (Weis, Ingle, Bushy) – (2:29)
3. "My Mirage" (4:31)
4. "So-Lo" (Ingle, DeLoach) – (3:35)
5. "Iron Butterfly Theme" (4:35)
6. "Possession" (5:29)
7. "My Mirage" (4:34)
8. "Are You Happy" (4:17)
9. "Her Favorite Style" (2:29)
10. "In-A-Gadda-Da-Vida" (15:20)
11. "So-Lo" (Ingle, DeLoach) – (4:26)
12. "Iron Butterfly Theme" (5:20)

Tracks 1–6 First Show April 27, 1968. Track 7 Second Show April 26, 1968, Tracks 8–12 Second Show April 27, 1968.

== Personnel ==
Iron Butterfly

- Doug Ingle – vocals, organ
- Erik Brann – guitars
- Lee Dorman – bass
- Ron Bushy – drums
