= Live at the Galaxy 1967 =

Live At The Galaxy 1967

Live album by Iron Butterfly
- Released: May 27, 2014
- Recorded: July 4, 1967
- Genre: Psychedelic rock, acid rock
- Length: 52:33
- Label: Purple Pyramids Records, Cleopatra Records

Live At The Galaxy 1967 is a 2014 unofficial live album by American psychedelic rock band Iron Butterfly, recorded on July 4, 1967 at the Galaxy Theater in Los Angeles, California and released as digital download, on digipak CD and deluxe colored 180-gram vinyl LP on the Purple Pyramids Records and Cleopatra Records label. It features the first, original line-up of the band, performing their early singles and songs from their debut album Heavy which was released a little more than six months later (January 22, 1968).

It was recorded live at the historic Galaxy Club located in the heart of the Sunset Strip in Los Angeles with a microphone from the audience.

== Track listing ==
Composition credited to Doug Ingle, unless otherwise noted or indicated (*).

=== Side A ===
1. Real Fright 2:37
2. Possession 4:51
3. Filled With Fear 4:31
4. Fields Of Sun (Ingle / Darryl DeLoach) 3:31
5. It’s Up To You * 2:48
6. Gloomy Day To Remember * 2:45
7. Evil Temptation (Ingle / DeLoach / Danny Weis / Jerry Penrod /Ron Bushy) 6:45

=== Side B ===
1. So-Lo (Ingle / Darryl DeLoach) 4:03
2. Gentle As It May Seem (DeLoach / Danny Weis) 4:04
3. Lonely Boy 5:57
4. Iron Butterfly Theme (Ingle / DeLoach) 7:06
5. You Can't Win (Charlie Smalls / LeLoach / Weis) 4:35

== Personnel ==
- Doug Ingle - organ, vocals
- Danny Weis - electric guitar
- Jerry Penrod - bass guitar, backing vocals
- Ron Bushy - drums, percussion, backing vocals
- Darryl DeLoach - percussion, vocals

and Dave Thompson - liner notes

== Reception ==
Professional ratings
Review scores
Source	Rating
Allmusic	0/5 stars

Fred Thomas of AllMusic called the album "grainy" and that the band was captured "in their earliest, roughest form, working out songs heavy on organ stabs and blues riffing". He described it as "spirited jamming" and a "particularly sharp" club performance. The performance of the "Iron Butterfly theme" was regarded "a high point" on the record. The audio quality was "on par with other obscure, audience-recorded artifacts of its era by psych bands like The Electric Prunes and others".
