= Light & Heavy: The Best of Iron Butterfly =

Compilation album by Iron Butterfly
- Released: January 19, 1993
- Genre: Hard rock, psychedelic rock, heavy metal, acid rock
- Length: 74:08
- Label: Rhino

Iron Butterfly chronology
Sun and Steel (1975)	Light & Heavy: The Best of Iron Butterfly (1993)

Professional ratings
Review scores
Source	Rating
Allmusic	4/5 stars

Light & Heavy: The Best of Iron Butterfly is a greatest hits compilation released by Iron Butterfly in 1993. It contains most of their studio recordings from 1967 to 1970, including 21 of their 33 studio album tracks from that period.

== Track listing ==
1. "Iron Butterfly Theme" – 4:34
2. "Possession" – 2:45
3. "Unconscious Power" – 2:32
4. "You Can't Win" – 2:41 (Bonus Track)
5. "So-Lo" – 4:05 (Bonus Track)
6. "In-A-Gadda-Da-Vida" (Single version) – 2:53
7. "Most Anything You Want" – 3:44
8. "Flowers and Beads" – 3:05
9. "My Mirage" – 4:55 (Bonus Track)
10. "Termination" – 3:00
11. "In the Time of Our Lives" – 4:52
12. "Soul Experience" – 2:53
13. "Real Fright" – 2:44 (Bonus Track)
14. "In the Crowds" – 2:13
15. "It Must Be Love" – 4:26
16. "Belda-Beast" – 5:45 (Bonus Track)
17. "I Can't Help But Deceive You, Little Girl" – 3:34
18. "New Day" – 3:20 (Bonus Track)
19. "Stone Believer" – 4:25
20. "Soldier in Our Town" – 3:22 (Bonus Track)
21. "Easy Rider (Let the Wind Pay the Way)" – 3:07

== Band Members ==
- Doug Ingle – lead vocals, organ: All tracks
- Darryl DeLoach – tambourine, vocals (including lead on track 5): Tracks 1–5
- Danny Weis – guitars: Tracks 1–5
- Jerry Penrod – bass: Tracks 1–5
- Ron Bushy – drums: All tracks
- Erik Brann – guitars, vocals (including lead on tracks 10 and 16): Tracks 6–17
- Lee Dorman – bass, vocals: Tracks 6–21
- Mike Pinera – guitar, vocals (including co-lead on tracks 18, 19, and 20): Tracks 18–21
- Larry "Rhino" Reinhardt – guitar: Tracks 18–21
