= Don't Look Down on Me =

Single by Iron Butterfly
- B-side: "Possession"
- Released: 1967
- Genre: Psychedelic rock, acid rock
- Length: 2:23
- Label: Cardinal, Janus, NEGRAM
- Songwriter: D. Hughes

Iron Butterfly singles chronology
"Don't Look Down on Me" (1967)	"Unconscious Power" (1968)

"Don't Look Down on Me" is the debut single by American rock band Iron Butterfly. Lead vocals were by Darryl DeLoach with Doug Ingle on organ and backing vocals. The song "Possession", which is on the flip-side, is the same as the version on the band's second single "Unconscious Power" as well as on the 1970 single release and is different from the version on the album Heavy. It is heavier in both its guitar and organ instrumentation than on the album version.

In 2014, Cleopatra Records reissued the single with the original artwork and an additional track on the B-side, "Evil Temptation" (from the B-side of "Possession").

== Track listing ==
A-side
No.	Title	Length
1.	"Don't Look Down on Me" (D. Hughes)	2:23

B-side
No.	Title	Length
1.	"Possession" (Doug Ingle)	2:41

== Personnel ==
- Doug Ingle – organ; lead vocal on "Possession"; backing vocal on "Don't Look Down on Me"
- Darryl DeLoach – tambourine; lead vocal on "Don't Look Down on Me"; backing vocal on "Possession"
- Danny Weis – guitars
- Jerry Penrod – bass
- Ron Bushy – drums
