= Silly Sally =

Single by Iron Butterfly
- B-side: "Stone Believer"
- Released: 1971
- Recorded: 1971
- Genre: Rock
- Length: 2:12
- Label: Atlantic
- Songwriter(s): Mike Pinera and M. Jones
- Producer(s): Brad Shapiro & Dave Crawford

"Silly Sally" is a song by Iron Butterfly that was released as a single in 1971 after the departure of Doug Ingle. Mike Pinera and M. Jones wrote "Silly Sally" in an attempt to keep the band together. Though the usual B-side is "Stone Believer", it has also been issued with "Butterfly Bleu" (voice box solo) on the B-side. The single did not chart and in 1971 Iron Butterfly disbanded.

== Track listing ==
Side one

1. "Silly Sally" (M. Pinera, M. Jones) – 2:12

Side two

2. "Stone Believer" (Doug Ingle, Ron Bushy, Lee Dorman) – 4:25

== Personnel ==
- Doug Ingle – organ and lead vocals on "Stone Believer"
- Mike Pinera – guitar, lead vocals
- Larry "Rhino" Reinhardt – guitar
- Lee Dorman – bass, backing vocals
- Ron Bushy – drums
- Diane Adams – background vocals on "Silly Sally"
