= Erik Brann =

Musical artist (1950-2003)

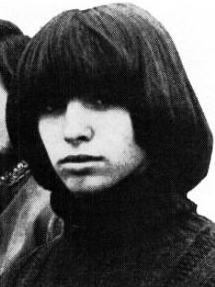
- Brann in 1969

Background information
- Also known as: Erik Braunn
- Born: Rick Davis; August 11, 1950; Pekin, Illinois, U.S.
- Died: July 25, 2003 (aged 52) Los Angeles, California, U.S.
- Genres: Psychedelic rock; acid rock; hard rock; instrumental
- Occupation: Musician
- Instruments: Guitar; vocals
- Years active: 1954–2003

Erik Keith Brann (born Rick Davis; August 11, 1950 – July 25, 2003), also known as Erik Braunn, was an American guitarist with the 1960s acid rock band Iron Butterfly. He was featured on the band's greatest hit, the 17-minute "In-A-Gadda-Da-Vida" (1968), recorded when he was 17.

== Early life ==
A native of Boston, Massachusetts, and a violinist, Brann's career began at age four when he was accepted as a child into the prodigy program at the Boston Symphony Orchestra. He was soon lured away to become a rock guitarist, first joining Paper Fortress, then Iron Butterfly at age 17.

== Career ==
=== Iron Butterfly ===
He played with Ron Bushy, Lee Dorman and Doug Ingle as Iron Butterfly from late 1967 to December 1969. The first album from this lineup, In-A-Gadda-Da-Vida, sold over 30 million copies, was awarded the first platinum award and stayed on the Billboard magazine charts for nearly three years. With arrangement assistance from Dorman, Brann wrote the song "Termination", which was featured on the album.

They are best known for the 1968 hit "In-A-Gadda-Da-Vida", providing a dramatic sound that led the way towards the development of hard rock and heavy metal music. The song, originally written by Ingle as "In the Garden of Eden" but as a result of singing the first draft whilst intoxicated was misheard by Bushy as "In-A-Gadda-Da-Vida", went to number thirty on the Billboard Hot 100, and charted highest in the Netherlands, where it went to number seven.

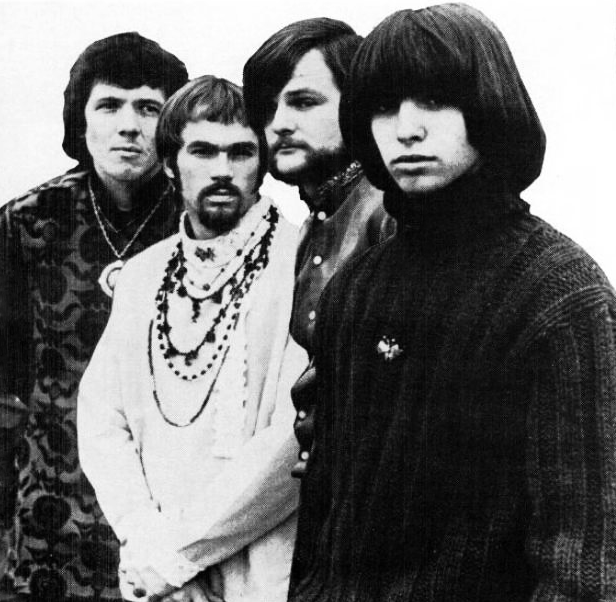
Brann (on the right) with Iron Butterfly in 1969

The album's mini-bio, written when he was 17, tells of an acting ambition he once had, clothing and food preference, and the ease with which rock 'n' roll artists were able to arrange sexual encounters (usually with groupies). It reads: "Although music has always been his one great love, Erik studied drama and before joining the Butterfly, his acting ability had landed him the lead role in a local play. ...Erik hopes to, one day, continue in the acting field. Right now, however, his only concern is the Iron Butterfly, turtleneck sweaters, bananas, and the fairer sex."

Their music has found a significant impact on the international rock scenes, influencing numerous acts such as Black Sabbath, AC/DC, Rush, Alice Cooper, Mountain, Uriah Heep, Soundgarden, Stone Temple Pilots, Slayer, King Gizzard & the Lizard Wizard, and Queens of the Stone Age.

Brann left the band after a final show in San Diego on December 13, 1969. Brann was frustrated with the band's unwillingness to move towards a harder rock sound. He was replaced in the line-up by two new musicians: guitarist/vocalist Mike Pinera (whose Blues Image had opened for Iron Butterfly's Vida tour) and guitarist Larry Reinhardt (from the Allman Brothers Band forerunner Second Coming). Both Pinera and Larry "Rhino" Reinhardt had been rehearsing secretly with the band since September 1969 after Brann had voiced his objections to continuing.

In 1974, he was contacted by a promoter about reforming Iron Butterfly, so he reunited with Ron Bushy to form a new version of the group, signing with MCA. The 1975 LP Scorching Beauty featured Brann on guitars and vocals, Bushy on drums, Philip Taylor Kramer (Bushy's friend) on bass, and Erik's friend Howard Reitzes (who worked in a music store frequented by Brann) on keyboards. The band also released Sun and Steel in late 1975 with Bill DeMartines replacing Reitzes on keyboards. Neither album sold well and the band disbanded shortly afterward (around summer 1977).

Between 1979 and 1990, Brann occasionally reunited with Iron Butterfly for concerts.

All together, Brann was in Iron Butterfly seven times: 1967–1969, 1974–1977, 1978–79, 1979–80, 1982, 1987, 1987–1989.

Erik’s Guitar And Amps

Erik Brann played a sunburst Mosrite Ventures model guitar during the recording of Iron Butterfly's 1968 hit "In-A-Gadda-Da-Vida". Specifically, he used a sunburst Mosrite Ventures model Mark I, which he acquired from the band's original guitarist, Danny Weis.

The Ventures model was Mosrite's flagship guitar in the 1960s, renowned for its distinctive German carve body, slim neck, and high-output single-coil pickups. In 1966, the Ventures II model was renamed the Mark V, featuring a slightly different body design. However, Erik’s guitar was the earlier Ventures model, not the later Mark V.

For amplification, Erik favored Vox Super Beatle amps, which contributed to his signature psychedelic tone. Additionally, it's believed he used a Mosrite Fuzzrite pedal to achieve the distinctive fuzz sound heard in "In-A-Gadda-Da-Vida".

Erik’s Mosrite Ventures model Mark I guitar, used during the recording of Iron Butterfly's "In-A-Gadda-Da-Vida", was equipped with a Mosrite-designed vibrato system known as the Vibramute. This system, developed by Semie Moseley, was inspired by the Bigsby vibrato, but featured several unique engineering improvements. The Vibramute was top-mounted and included a foam-rubber string mute beneath the bridge. Strings were fed through a string stop connected to the tremolo arm and mounted to saddles with individual string rollers that moved with the string when the bar was used. This design allowed for smooth pitch modulation and easy palm muting.

=== Post-Butterfly career ===
In 1970, Brann and former Iron Butterfly member Darryl DeLoach formed Flintwhistle. This band performed live for about a year before breaking up. Between 1972 and 1973, Brann worked solely in the studio on various demos. In 1973, he recorded a couple of demos with MCA Records which can be found on bootleg sites. Notable songs from these demos include early versions of "Hard Miseree", "Am I Down", and "Scorching Beauty".

== Death ==
He died on July 25, 2003 in Los Angeles, California, of a cardiac arrest related to a birth defect that he had struggled with for years, and was the first member of the In-A-Gadda-Da-Vida lineup to die, followed by Lee Dorman in 2012, Ron Bushy in 2021, and Doug Ingle in 2024.

== Discography ==
=== Iron Butterfly ===
(See full discography at Iron Butterfly)

Albums

- In-A-Gadda-Da-Vida (1968)
- Ball (1969)
- Live (1970)
- Evolution: The Best of Iron Butterfly (1971)
- Star Collection (1973)
- Scorching Beauty (1975)
- Sun and Steel (1976)
- Rare Flight (1988)
- Light & Heavy: The Best of Iron Butterfly (1993)
