= Captain Beyond (album) =

Studio album by Captain Beyond
- Released: July 1972
- Recorded: 1972
- Studio: Sunset Sound Recorders, Hollywood
- Genre: Hard rock; space rock; proto-metal
- Length: 35:10
- Label: Capricorn
- Producer: Captain Beyond

Captain Beyond chronology
Captain Beyond (1972)	Sufficiently Breathless (1973)

Professional ratings
Review scores
Source	Rating
Allmusic	4.5/5 stars

Captain Beyond is the debut album by Captain Beyond, an American rock supergroup featuring former members of Iron Butterfly, Deep Purple, Johnny Winter. Released in 1972, the album cover for the U.S. release included 3-D artwork (using lenticular printing). The album was dedicated to the memory of Duane Allman, who Captain Beyond drummer Bobby Caldwell had played with in an informal capacity.

== Overview ==
Captain Beyond is unique among guitar-driven hard rock albums in that it contains a wide range of influences, including Latin and jazz, often with various time signatures and a broad range of dynamics within the same song. Most of the album consists of three medleys of tightly arranged interconnected songs. The first starts with "Dancing Madly Backwards (on a Sea of Air)" and ends with "Myopic Void". The second starts with "Thousand Days of Yesterdays (Intro)" and ends with "Thousand Days of Yesterdays (Time Since Come and Gone)". The third starts with "I Can't Feel Nothin' (Part 1)" and finishes the album. Songs flow directly into each other without any lag time between selections, a feature that is shared with other more progressive bands of the era such as The Moody Blues and Jethro Tull.

All of the songwriting was credited to lead vocalist Rod Evans and drummer Bobby Caldwell. However, the songs were in fact written by the group as a whole. Due to their still binding contracts with Iron Butterfly, guitarist Larry Reinhardt and bassist Lee Dorman could not be listed as songwriters on this record for legal reasons.

== Chart performance ==
The album debuted on Billboard magazine's Top LP's & Tape chart in the issue dated August 19, 1972, peaking at No. 134 during a twelve-week run on the chart.

== Track listing ==
All tracks are written by Bobby Caldwell and Rod Evans.

Side one
No.	Title	Length
1.	"Dancing Madly Backwards (on a Sea of Air)"	4:02
2.	"Armworth"	1:48
3.	"Myopic Void"	3:31
4.	"Mesmerization Eclipse"	3:48
5.	"Raging River of Fear"	3:47

Side two
No.	Title	Length
1.	"Thousand Days of Yesterdays (Intro)"	1:16
2.	"Frozen Over"	3:46
3.	"Thousand Days of Yesterdays (Time Since Come and Gone)"	3:57
4.	"I Can't Feel Nothin' (Part I)"	3:06
5.	"As the Moon Speaks (to the Waves of the Sea)"	1:27
6.	"Astral Lady"	0:58
7.	"As the Moon Speaks (Return)"	1:57
8.	"I Can't Feel Nothin' (Part II)"	1:46

== Personnel ==
Captain Beyond

- Rod Evans – lead vocals
- Larry "Rhino" Reinhardt – guitars
- Lee Dorman – bass, backing vocals, piano
- Bobby Caldwell – drums, percussion, bells, vibraphone, backing vocals, piano

== Charts ==
Chart (1972)	Peak position
US Billboard Top LPs	134
