= Metamorphosis (Iron Butterfly album) =

Iron Butterfly album

Studio album by Iron Butterfly
- Released: August 13, 1970
- Recorded: May–July 1970
- Studio: American Recording Co., Studio City, California
- Genre: Hard rock; proto–metal; psychedelic rock; acid rock
- Length: 40:50
- Label: Atco
- Producer: Richard Podolor

Iron Butterfly chronology
Live (1970)	Metamorphosis (1970)	Evolution: The Best of Iron Butterfly (1971)

Metamorphosis is the fourth studio album by Iron Butterfly, released on August 13, 1970. It reached number 16 on the US charts and number 31 in Canada. Mike Pinera and Larry "El Rhino" Reinhardt joined Iron Butterfly for this album in early 1970. It was the last studio album to feature original organist and vocalist Doug Ingle.

The album was recorded at American Recording studio and produced by Richard Podolor, engineered by Bill Cooper.

The single "Easy Rider" reached number 66 on the Billboard chart and number 48 in Canada, making it the band's biggest hit aside from "In-A-Gadda-Da-Vida". The album is noted for having one of the earliest uses of the talk box on a rock album, which Pinera used on "Butterfly Bleu."

== Reception ==
Professional ratings
Review scores
Source	Rating
AllMusic	3/5 stars

AllMusic's Stephen Thomas Erlewine rated Metamorphosis three out of five stars. He explained that "the group continued its musical explorations, adding a layered production to its sound." He also stated that "[the] ambition [...] makes for an interesting listen."

== Track listing ==
All tracks are written by Ron Bushy, Lee Dorman, and Doug Ingle, except where noted.

Side one
No.	Title	Lead vocals	Length
1.	"Free Flight"	None	0:49
2.	"New Day"	Ingle, Pinera	3:21
3.	"Shady Lady" (music: Bushy, Dorman, Ingle; lyrics: Robert Woods Edmonson)	Ingle	3:58
4.	"Best Years of Our Life"	Pinera	4:00
5.	"Slower Than Guns" (music: Ingle; lyrics: Edmonson)	Ingle	3:50
6.	"Stone Believer"	Ingle, Pinera	4:26

Side two
No.	Title	Lead vocals	Length
7.	"Soldier in Our Town" (music: Bushy, Dorman, Ingle; lyrics: Edmonson)	Ingle	3:22
8.	"Easy Rider (Let the Wind Pay the Way)" (music: Bushy, Dorman, Ingle; lyrics: Edmonson)	Ingle	3:07
9.	"Butterfly Bleu"	Pinera	13:57

Songwriting credits per BMI Records. The album sleeve ambiguously credits the songs to "Iron Butterfly".

== Personnel ==
=== Iron Butterfly ===
- Ron Bushy – drums
- Lee Dorman – bass guitar
- Doug Ingle – organ, vocals
- Mike Pinera – guitar, vocals
- Larry Reinhardt – guitar

=== Additional personnel ===
- Richard Podolor – producer, sitar, twelve-string guitar
- Bill Cooper – engineer, twelve-string guitar
- Roger Webster – art direction, photography, front cover
- Bob Jenkins – art direction, photography (inside)
- Robert Blue – back cover art

== Charts ==
"Easy Rider (Let the Wind Pay the Way)"

Chart (1970)	Position
Canada	48
Billboard Hot 100	66

== Singles ==
US singles

- "Easy Rider (Let the Wind Pay the Way)" b/w "Soldier in Our Town"
- "Stone Believer" b/w "Silly Sally" (Non-LP cut)

Non-US singles

- "Easy Rider (Let the Wind Pay the Way)" b/w "Soldier in Our Town"
- "New Day" b/w "Soldier in Our Town"
- "Best Years of Our Life" b/w "Shady Lady"
- "Silly Sally" b/w "Stone Believer"
