= Sufficiently Breathless =

Studio album by Captain Beyond
- Released: May 1973
- Recorded: 1973
- Genre: Progressive rock; jazz fusion; proto–metal
- Length: 33:15
- Label: Capricorn
- Producer: Phil Walden

Captain Beyond chronology
Captain Beyond (1972)	Sufficiently Breathless (1973)	Dawn Explosion (1977)

Professional ratings
Review scores
Source	Rating
Allmusic	4.5/5 stars

Sufficiently Breathless, the second album by Captain Beyond, was released in 1973 and features a jazzier, smoother sound than its predecessor, reminiscent of mid-1970s Santana. The medley format of the first album is retained only for the last six minutes of Sufficiently Breathless: "Voyages of Past Travellers" flows directly into "Everything's a Circle", which in turn is actually two distinct songs despite being listed under a single title. Original drummer/songwriter Bobby Caldwell had been replaced by Marty Rodriguez and Guille Garcia in the band.

According to bassist Lee Dorman, the songs were written by vocalist Rod Evans, guitarist Larry "Rhino" Reinhardt, and Dorman himself, but Rodriguez and Garcia were allotted a percentage point of the songwriting royalties due to their contributions to the arrangements. Sufficiently Breathless also featured a sixth band member, pianist Reese Wynans, but his time with Captain Beyond was brief; he did not play on the album's title track and quit after one show with the band due to his economic situation. Dorman alone was credited as writing the songs on the album, because Reinhardt and Evans were in litigation with Iron Butterfly and Deep Purple at the time.

== Track listing ==
All tracks are written by Lee Dorman.

Side one
No.	Title	Length
1.	"Sufficiently Breathless"	5:15
2.	"Bright Blue Tango"	4:11
3.	"Drifting in Space"	3:12
4.	"Evil Men"	4:51

Side two
No.	Title	Length
1.	"Starglow Energy"	5:04
2.	"Distant Sun"	4:42
3.	"Voyages of Past Travellers"	1:46
4.	"Everything's a Circle"	4:14

== Personnel ==
- Rod Evans – lead and harmony vocals
- Larry "Rhino" Reinhardt – electric, acoustic, and slide guitars
- Lee Dorman – bass
- Reese Wynans – electric and acoustic pianos
- Marty Rodriguez – drums, backing vocals
- Guille Garcia – congas, timbales, percussion

Additional personnel

- Paul Hornsby – organ on "Starglow Energy"

== Charts ==
Chart (1973)	Peak position
US Billboard Top LPs	90
