= Live (Iron Butterfly album) =

Live album by Iron Butterfly

Live album by Iron Butterfly
- Released: April 22, 1970
- Recorded: May 25–30, 1969
- Genre: Psychedelic rock; acid rock; hard rock; jam rock
- Length: 36:53
- Label: Atco
- Producer: Richard Podolor

Iron Butterfly chronology
Ball (1969)	Live (1970)	Metamorphosis (1970)

Live is the first live album by Iron Butterfly, released on April 22, 1970. The last album to be recorded with the longstanding quartet of Brann, Bushy, Dorman, and Ingle. It is the only Iron Butterfly album which features a single lead vocalist (Ingle). It was a commercial hit, reaching number 20 on the Billboard album chart.

== Reception ==
Professional ratings
Review scores
Source	Rating
AllMusic	3/5 stars

Stephen Thomas Erlewine of AllMusic rated Live three out of five stars. He called the album "a dull document of Iron Butterfly's thundering live show," and declared the live rendition of "In-A-Gadda-Da-Vida" to be "three times as tedious" as the original version.

== Track listing ==
=== Side one ===
1. "In the Time of Our Lives" (Doug Ingle, Ron Bushy) – 4:23
2. "Filled with Fear" (Ingle) – 3:27
3. "Soul Experience" (Ingle, Bushy, Erik Brann, Lee Dorman) – 3:55
4. "You Can't Win" (Danny Weis, Darryl DeLoach) – 2:48
5. "Are You Happy" (Ingle) – 3:20

=== Side two ===
1. "In-A-Gadda-Da-Vida" (Ingle) – 19:00

== Charts ==
Chart (1970)	Peak position
Australian (Kent Music Report)	17

== Personnel ==
=== Iron Butterfly ===
- Erik Brann – guitar
- Doug Ingle – organ, lead vocals
- Lee Dorman – bass, backing vocals
- Ron Bushy – drums

=== Technical ===
- Richard Podolor – producer
- Bill Cooper – engineer
- John Kress – album art
- Bob Jenkins, Ron Bushy – photography
