= Sun and Steel =

Sun and Steel may refer to:

- Sun and Steel (essay), a 1970 essay by Yukio Mishima
- Sun and Steel (album), a 1975 album by Iron Butterfly
- Sun and Steel, a song by Iron Maiden from their 1983 album Piece of Mind
