= Dawn Explosion =

Studio album by Captain Beyond
- Released: April 1977
- Recorded: 1976–1977
- Studio: Record Plant, Sausalito
- Genre: Progressive rock; hard rock; proto–metal
- Length: 37:57
- Label: Warner Bros.
- Producer: John Stronach, Captain Beyond

Captain Beyond chronology
Sufficiently Breathless (1973)	Dawn Explosion (1977)

Professional ratings
Review scores
Source	Rating
Allmusic	2/5 stars
Rolling Stone	(not rated)

Dawn Explosion, the third and final album by Captain Beyond, was released in 1977. While the band had broken up four years before, Warner Bros. Records signed a deal with the band's original label, Capricorn Records, and contacted the band members asking them to reunite. Original member Bobby Caldwell returned on drums, but original lead vocalist Rod Evans could not be contacted after extensive enquiries: Captain Beyond held auditions, and selected Willy Daffern to replace him.

The track "Dawn Explosion" was recorded during the album sessions, but was cut from the final album, despite taking its title from it.

== Track listing ==
Side one
No.	Title	Writer(s)	Length
1.	"Do or Die"	Bobby Caldwell, Willy Daffern, Larry "Rhino" Reinhardt	3:38
2.	"Icarus"	Caldwell, Lee Dorman, Reinhardt	4:17
3.	"Sweet Dreams"	Caldwell, Dorman, Reinhardt	5:29
4.	"Fantasy"	Caldwell, Daffern, Reinhardt	6:02

Side two
No.	Title	Writer(s)	Length
1.	"Breath of Fire, Part 1 & Part 2"	Caldwell, Daffern, Reinhardt	6:19
2.	"If You Please"	Caldwell, Daffern, Dorman, Reinhardt	4:13
3.	"Midnight Memories"	Reinhardt	3:59
4.	"Oblivion"	Caldwell, Dorman, Reinhardt	4:00

CD reissues split "Breath of Fire, Part 1 & Part 2" into two tracks (subtitled "A Speck Within a Sphere" and "Alone in the Cosmos", respectively), and "Oblivion" into three tracks (with the preceding "Space Interlude" and succeeding "Space Reprise" being the sound effects and percussion that bookend the main section of "Oblivion").

== Personnel ==
Captain Beyond

- Willy Daffern – lead vocals
- Larry "Rhino" Reinhardt – lead guitar, acoustic guitar, slide guitar
- Lee Dorman – bass, backing vocals, string ensemble synthesizer
- Bobby Caldwell – drums, percussion, backing vocals

== Charts ==
Year	Chart	Peak position
1977	U.S. Billboard Pop Albums	181
