= Light & Heavy =

Light & Heavy may refer to:

- Light & Heavy (film), 1991 short film
- Light & Heavy: The Best of Iron Butterfly, 1993 album by Iron Butterfly
