= Stephen Paley =

American photographer and producer

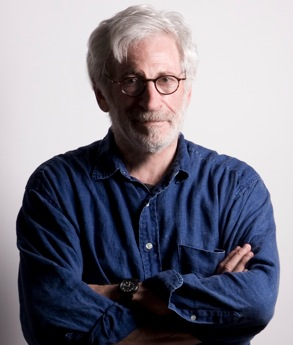

Stephen Drew Paley (born March 2, 1942, New York City, United States) is an American photographer, radio producer, television producer, music supervisor and actor.

His photographs have appeared in Life, Look, Vogue, Newsweek, Rolling Stone, The New York Times and Vanity Fair, and in the books The Rolling Stone History of Rock & Roll. and Shooting Stars (edited by Annie Leibovitz) and Wild: Fashion Untamed (published by The Metropolitan Museum of Art and Yale University Press). Paley has shot album covers for (among others) The Allman Brothers, Cher, Aretha Franklin, Cream, Sly and the Family Stone, Laura Nyro, Wilson Pickett, Lulu, MC5, J. Geils Band, Iron Butterfly, Memphis Horns, Billy Vera , and The Sweet Inspirations. Paley was one of the “special magazine photographers” on the films, Midnight Cowboy and Paint Your Wagon.

Paley's many arts and entertainment pieces were broadcast on National Public Radio (1984–91). Callas In Her Own Words, the four-hour radio documentary Paley produced and edited about the life and career of the soprano Maria Callas was broadcast on WFMT in Chicago (2002) and an earlier version was heard on KUSC in Los Angeles (1988), and on many other stations around the country and the world. For KCRW, Santa Monica's public radio station, Paley produced three-hour radio programs on David Raksin (2004), Nelson Riddle (1986) and Atlantic Records’s years as a rhythm and blues label (1987).

For KCET, Los Angeles’s public television station, Paley produced a series of programs on 1950s Googie architecture with the writer Alan Hess (1986).

At Warner Bros. studios, Paley was head of music for Orion Pictures and The Ladd Company (1979–1983), supervising music for the films Arthur, Excalibur, Caddyshack, Wolfen, Night Shift, Chariots of Fire, Blade Runner, and The Right Stuff. He executive produced the Academy Award-winning song, "Arthur's Theme," and then commissioned Burt Bacharach and Carole Bayer Sager to write the Grammy-winning song "That's What Friends Are For" for the Night Shift soundtrack where it was introduced by Rod Stewart. Paley gave composer Thomas Newman his first theatrical movie to score ("Reckless") and hired James Horner to compose his first important film score for Oliver Stone's first directorial effort (The Hand).

For ten years (1974–1984), Paley compiled and edited the music that accompanied many of Diana Vreeland's exhibitions at the Metropolitan Museum of Art's Costume Institute. ("Romantic & Glamorous Hollywood", "American Woman of Style", "The Glory of Russian Costume", "Diaghilev," "Fashions of the Hapsburg Era", "The Manchu Dragon", "The 18th Century Woman", "La Belle Epoque", and "YSL" on Yves St. Laurent.) When Vreeland died, in 1989, Paley was asked by the Met to produce the music for her memorial service.

Paley was Director of Talent Acquisition for Epic Records (1970–1975) where he was the A & R (Artists and Repertoire) liaison to Sly and the Family Stone., Jeff Beck and Rupert Holmes. Among the gold records Paley worked on were Sly and the Family Stone's "Family Affair" and "If You Want Me to Stay", The Looking Glass's "Brandy" and "Jimmy Loves Mary-ann," along with "Superstition", which Paley hired Stevie Wonder to write and produce for guitarist Jeff Beck, but the record turned out so well that Stevie Wonder kept it for himself!

For CBS's Camera Three (1976), Paley produced and co-wrote, with Frank Rich, Anatomy of a Song, a television program that examined Stephen Sondheim’s creative process of writing a song (1976) and Paley produced the first television biography of composer Bernard Herrmann. (1976). Paley was also a segment producer for the ABC News television magazine program 20/20 (1979–1980).

At nineteen, Paley was directed by George Abbott on Broadway in a featured role in Hal Prince’s production of Take Her, She's Mine with Art Carney, Phyllis Thaxter and Elizabeth Ashley (1961–1962).
