= Heavy (Iron Butterfly album) =

Album by Iron Butterfly

Studio album by Iron Butterfly
- Released: January 22, 1968
- Recorded: October 1967
- Studio: Gold Star (Hollywood, California); Nashville West (Hollywood, California)
- Genre: Acid rock; psychedelic rock; hard rock; proto-metal
- Length: 30:45
- Label: Atco
- Producer: Charles Greene; Brian Stone

Iron Butterfly chronology
Heavy (1968)	In-A-Gadda-Da-Vida (1968)

Heavy is the debut studio album by the rock band Iron Butterfly, released on January 22, 1968.

The first two tracks, "Unconscious Power" and "Possession", were released as the respective sides of a single.

Three of the group's members (Darryl DeLoach, Jerry Penrod, and Danny Weis) left the band shortly after the album was recorded, leaving drummer Ron Bushy and organist Doug Ingle to find replacements. Despite being a debut album with no hit single to provide an entry point for the casual listener, Heavy was a commercial success, reaching number 78 on the Billboard Charts and eventually going Gold in the US.

== Cover art ==
The album's artwork depicts the band members playing their instruments beside a large monument of a human ear. It was designed by Armando Busich (artwork) and Joe Ravetz (photography).

== Background ==
Iron Butterfly had amassed a considerable body of material by the time Heavy was recorded, much of which was held over for later albums. In addition to the ten songs on Heavy, songs from this era include "In-A-Gadda-Da-Vida" (later recorded for the album of the same name), "Lonely Boy", "Real Fright", "Filled with Fear" (all later recorded for Ball), "Evil Temptation" (an instrumental version of which was later used as the B-side to "Possession"), "It's All Up to You", and "Gloomy Day to Remember".

== Reception ==
Professional ratings
Review scores
Source	Rating
Allmusic	3.5/5 stars

Allmusic's Stephen Thomas Erlewine rated Heavy three-and-a-half out of five stars. He stated that "most of the album was not particularly well written" but that "the band's overwhelmingly loud sonic attack occasionally made up for the weakness in the material."

== Track listing ==
Side one
No.	Title	Lyrics	Music	Lead Vocals	Length
1.	"Possession"	Doug Ingle	Doug Ingle	Ingle with DeLoach	2:45
2.	"Unconscious Power"	Ron Bushy	Ingle, Danny Weis	Ingle with DeLoach	2:32
3.	"Get Out of My Life, Woman"	Allen Toussaint	Allen Toussaint	Ingle with DeLoach	3:58
4.	"Gentle as It May Seem"	Darryl DeLoach	Weis	Ingle with DeLoach	2:25
5.	"You Can't Win"	DeLoach	Weis	Ingle with DeLoach	2:41

Side two
No.	Title	Lyrics	Music	Lead Vocals	Length
1.	"So-Lo"	DeLoach	Ingle	DeLoach with Ingle	4:05
2.	"Look for the Sun"	DeLoach	Ingle, Weis	DeLoach and Penrod	2:14
3.	"Fields of Sun"	DeLoach	Ingle	DeLoach with Ingle	3:12
4.	"Stamped Ideas"	DeLoach	Ingle	DeLoach with Ingle	2:08
5.	"Iron Butterfly Theme"	-	Ingle	Instrumental	4:34

== Personnel ==
=== Iron Butterfly ===
- Ron Bushy – drums
- Darryl DeLoach – tambourine, vocals
- Doug Ingle – organ, vocals
- Jerry Penrod – bass, vocals
- Danny Weis – guitar

=== Technical ===
- Brian Stone – producer
- Charles Greene – producer
- Armando Busich – artwork
- Joe Ravetz – photography

== Singles ==
US singles

- "Don't Look Down on Me" (non-album track) b/w "Possession" (Early Version)
- "Unconscious Power" b/w "Possession"
- "Iron Butterfly Theme", "Possession" b/w "Get Out of My Life, Woman", "Unconscious Power" (Radio EP)

International singles

- "Iron Butterfly Theme" b/w "So-Lo"
