= Lee Dorman =

American bass guitarist (1942-2012)

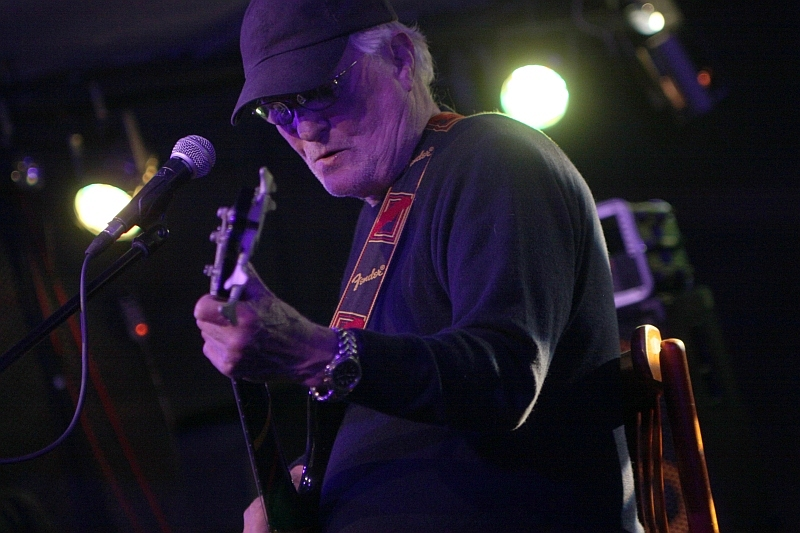
- Dorman with Iron Butterfly in Prague, 2012.

Background information
- Born: September 15, 1942; Chesterfield, Missouri, U.S.
- Died: December 21, 2012 (aged 70) Laguna Niguel, California, U.S.
- Genres: Psychedelic rock
- Occupation: Musician
- Instruments: Bass; vocals
- Years active: 1960s–2012
- Labels: Atco; Capricorn

Douglas Lee Dorman (September 15, 1942 – December 21, 2012) was an American bass guitarist best known as a member of the psychedelic rock band Iron Butterfly. He was also a founding member of the British-American supergroup Captain Beyond.

== Career ==
=== Iron Butterfly ===
Lee Dorman and Erik Brann joined Ron Bushy and Doug Ingle to form a new lineup of Iron Butterfly in late 1967. The first album from this lineup, In-A-Gadda-Da-Vida, sold over 30 million copies, was awarded the first platinum award and stayed on the Billboard magazine charts for nearly three years. With arrangement assistance from Dorman, Erik Brann wrote the song "Termination", which was featured on the album.

They are best known for the 1968 hit "In-A-Gadda-Da-Vida", providing a dramatic sound that led the way towards the development of hard rock and heavy metal music. The song, originally written by Doug Ingle as "In the Garden of Eden" but as a result of singing the first draft whilst intoxicated was misheard by drummer Ron Bushy as "In-A-Gadda-Da-Vida", went to number thirty on the Billboard Hot 100, and charted highest in the Netherlands, where it went to number seven.

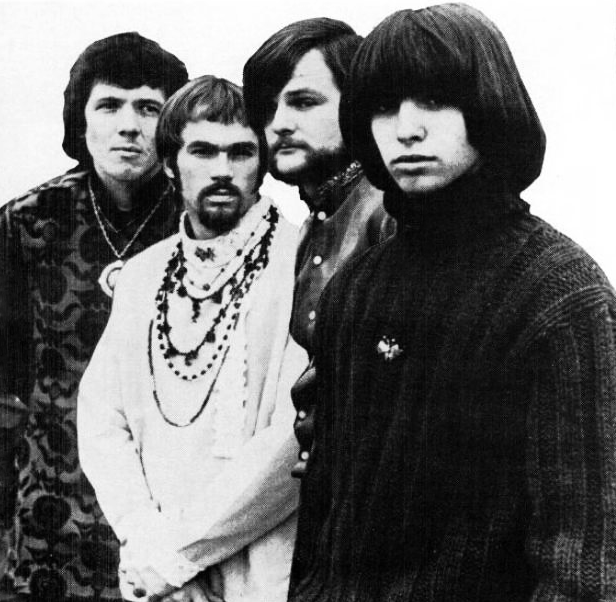
Dorman (second from right) with Iron Butterfly in 1969

While recording In-A-Gadda-Da-Vida, Dorman assisted Erik Brann with the arrangement of Brann's song "Termination", and was given a co-writing credit.

Their music has found a significant impact on the international rock scenes, influencing numerous acts such as Black Sabbath, AC/DC, Rush, Alice Cooper, Mountain, Uriah Heep, Soundgarden, Stone Temple Pilots, Slayer, King Gizzard & the Lizard Wizard, and Queens of the Stone Age.

Dorman had four stints with the group; 1967 to 1971, 1977 to 1978, 1978 to 1985, and from 1987 until his death in 2012. He was the longest serving member of the original foursome, and the longest serving of all the past and present members of Iron Butterfly.

=== Captain Beyond ===
Shortly after his first departure from Iron Butterfly in 1971, Dorman co-founded the supergroup Captain Beyond with ex-Deep Purple lead vocalist Rod Evans, Dorman’s Butterfly band mate Larry Reinhardt, and Bobby Caldwell. The band had an eclectic style bridging elements of hard rock, progressive rock and jazz fusion with space rock. They released three albums between 1972 and 1977.

The band was plagued from its inception with significant problems, including lawsuits involving Evans, Reinhardt and Dorman with their former bands, and a dispute over musical style with their record label, Capricorn Records.

== Personal life ==
Dorman was raised in St. Louis, Missouri, and moved to San Diego in the 1960s. He began playing bass guitar in his teens.

== Death ==
Dorman died of natural causes in his car in Laguna Niguel, California, on December 21, 2012. He was the second member of the In-A-Gadda-Da-Vida lineup to die, being preceded by Brann in 2003, and succeeded by Bushy in 2021, and Ingle in 2024.

== Discography ==
Iron Butterfly

(See full discography at Iron Butterfly)

- In-A-Gadda-Da-Vida (1968)
- Ball (1969)
- Live (1970)
- Metamorphosis (1970)
- Scorching Beauty (1975)
- Sun and Steel (1976)

Captain Beyond

(See full discography at Captain Beyond)

- Captain Beyond (1972)
- Sufficiently Breathless (1973)
- Dawn Explosion (1977)
