= In-A-Gadda-Da-Vida (album) =

Studio album by Iron Butterfly
- Released: June 14, 1968
- Recorded: First half of 1968 (side two was recorded on May 27, 1968)
- Studios: Gold Star, Hollywood; Ultra-Sonic, Hempstead
- Genres: Acid rock; psychedelic rock; hard rock; proto-metal
- Length: 36:15
- Label: Atco/Atlantic Records
- Producer: Jim Hilton

Iron Butterfly chronology
Heavy (1968)	In-A-Gadda-Da-Vida (1968)	Ball (1969)

Singles from In-A-Gadda-Da-Vida
- 1. "In-A-Gadda-Da-Vida (edited)" Released: July 31, 1968

In-A-Gadda-Da-Vida is the second studio album by the American rock band Iron Butterfly, released in June 1968. It is most known for its title track, a 17-minute composition that occupies the entirety of Side B.

A massive commercial success, In-A-Gadda-Da-Vida peaked at number 4 on the Billboard albums chart. It was officially certified a Gold album in 1968 in the United States, and on January 26, 1993, it was certified 4× Platinum. In Canada, it was on the charts for 91 weeks between October 14, 1968, and July 18, 1970.

== Composition and music ==
The tracks on the album's front side are psychedelic in style, while the album's back side is entirely composed of its closer, "In-A-Gadda-Da-Vida" a 17-minute track that has been described as an "unprecedented epic." The tracks "My Mirage" and "Flowers And Beads" have been characterized as representing "the dark side of hippie ideology."

== Reception ==
Professional ratings
Review scores
Source	Rating
AllMusic	4.5/5 stars
Rolling Stone	Negative
Encyclopedia of Popular Music	4/5 stars

In a retrospective review for AllMusic, Stephen Thomas Erlewine calls the title track "the epitome of heavy psychedelic excess," and feels that the rest of the songs "qualify as good artifacts." It was voted number 783 in Colin Larkin's All Time Top 1000 Albums.

== Track listing ==
All tracks are written by Doug Ingle, except "Termination", by Erik Brann and Lee Dorman.

Side one

1. "Most Anything You Want" – 3:44
2. "Flowers and Beads" – 3:09
3. "My Mirage" – 4:55
4. "Termination" – 2:53
5. "Are You Happy" – 4:31

Side two

1. "In-A-Gadda-Da-Vida" – 17:05

1995 deluxe edition bonus tracks

1. "In-A-Gadda-Da-Vida" (live) – 18:51
2. "In-A-Gadda-Da-Vida" (single version) – 2:53

== Deluxe edition ==
A "deluxe edition" of In-A-Gadda-Da-Vida was released in 1995. It included material from newly discovered first-generation master tapes, bonus recordings, and a 36-page booklet with photos. This re-release includes three versions of "In-A-Gadda-Da-Vida": the 17:05 studio version; the live version from Iron Butterfly's Live (which includes a short organ intro); and the single edit. The deluxe edition also includes a new cover, similar to the original, but with a moving butterfly flapping its wings and the band members jamming to the song.

== Personnel ==
Iron Butterfly

- Erik Brann – guitar, backing vocals; lead vocals (track 4)
- Ron Bushy – drums, percussion
- Lee Dorman – bass guitar, backing vocals
- Doug Ingle – Vox Continental organ, vocals

All arrangements by Iron Butterfly

Technical

- Jim Hilton – producer, engineer
- Bill Cooper – mixing engineer
- Don Casale – engineer
- Loring Eutemey – artwork
- Stephen Paley – photography

== Charts ==
Chart performance for In-A-Gadda-Da-Vida
Chart (1968–1970)	Peak position
Australian Albums (Kent Music Report)	14
Canada (RPM)	8
Dutch Albums (Album Top 100)	5
German Albums (Offizielle Top 100)	11
US Billboard 200	4

1969 year-end chart performances for In-A-Gadda-Da-Vida
Chart (1969)	Position
US Billboard 200	1

Chart performance for singles from In-A-Gadda-Da-Vida
Year	Single	Chart	Position
1968	"In-A-Gadda-Da-Vida"	US Billboard Hot 100	30

== Certifications ==
Certifications for In-A-Gadda-Da-Vida
Region	Certification	Certified units/sales
Australia (ARIA)	Platinum	70,000^{^}
Canada (Music Canada)	Gold	50,000^{^}
France (SNEP)	Gold	100,000^{*}
Germany (BVMI)	Platinum	500,000^{^}
United Kingdom (BPI) 2001 release	Silver	60,000^{^}
United States (RIAA)	4× Platinum	4,000,000^{^}
^{*} Sales figures based on certification alone.^{^} Shipments figures based on certification alone.

== Singles ==
US singles

- "In-A-Gadda-Da-Vida" b/w "Iron Butterfly Theme" (both are edited versions) – Atco 6606
- "In-A-Gadda-Da-Vida" b/w "Soul Experience" – Atlantic Oldies Series 13076

Overseas singles

- "In-A-Gadda-Da-Vida", "Flowers and Beads" b/w "My Mirage" (EP release)
- "Termination" b/w "Most Anything You Want"
