= Captain Beyond =

American rock band

- Origin: Los Angeles, California
- Genres: Hard rock; progressive rock; jazz fusion; space rock
- Years active: 1971–1973; 1976–1978; 1998–2003; 2013–2017; 2019–2022; 2025–present
- Labels: Purple Pyramid, a division of Cleopatra; Capricorn; Warner Bros.
- Members: Bobby Caldwell; Jeff Artabasy; Don Bonzi; Jamie Holka; Simon Lind
- Past members: Lee Dorman; Rod Evans; Lewie Gold; Larry "Rhino" Reinhardt; Guille Garcia; Brian Glascock; Reese Wynans; Marty Rodriguez; Jason Cahoon; Willy Daffern; Dan Frye; Jimi Interval; Steve Petrey; Allen Carmen; Jeff "Boday" Christensen
- Website: officialcaptainbeyond.com

Captain Beyond is an American rock supergroup formed in Los Angeles in 1971. Consisting of former Deep Purple singer Rod Evans, former Johnny Winter drummer Bobby Caldwell, and former Iron Butterfly members Larry Reinhardt (guitar) and Lee Dorman (bass), the band had an eclectic style bridging elements of hard rock, progressive rock and jazz fusion with space rock. They released three albums between 1972 and 1977.

The band was plagued from its inception with significant problems, including lawsuits involving Evans, Reinhardt and Dorman with their former bands, and a dispute over musical style with their record label, Capricorn Records. Although the band performed well together, relationships among the various band members were strained. In particular, singer Rod Evans left and rejoined the band several times beginning in 1971, and made his departure permanent in late 1973, after the release of the band's second album.

== History ==
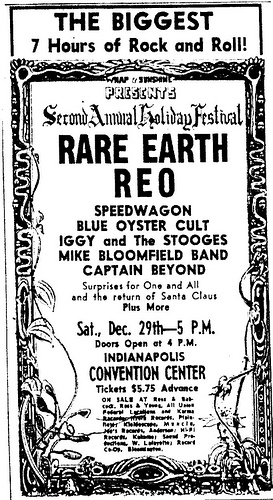
A newspaper advertisement for a concert featuring Captain Beyond in 1973 at the Indianapolis Convention Center

The original line-up for Captain Beyond included former Deep Purple singer Rod Evans, former Johnny Winter drummer Bobby Caldwell, former Iron Butterfly guitarist Larry "Rhino" Reinhardt and former Iron Butterfly bassist Lee Dorman alongside keyboardist Lewie Gold. Gold left for personal reasons before the first album was recorded. The remaining line-up recorded the self-titled debut album, released in 1972 by Capricorn Records, a Macon, Georgia-based independent label primarily known for cultivating such Southern rock groups as The Allman Brothers Band and Wet Willie.

Following that album, Caldwell left the band to join Derringer and was replaced by Brian Glascock. Also joining the band around that time were keyboardist Reese Wynans and conguero Guille Garcia. The record company's chosen producer, Giorgio Gomelsky, did not like Glascock's drumming and requested a new drummer. Glascock was released and Marty Rodriguez was brought in on drums on the recommendation of Garcia. This six-man lineup recorded the group's second album, Sufficiently Breathless, with producer and Capricorn Records co-founder Phil Walden. Tension during the recording led to Evans quitting, and the band splitting consequently. The original lineup with Caldwell reformed later in 1973 for gigs in the US and Canada. However, Evans left the band permanently around Christmas of 1973 and the band broke up.

The band reformed in 1976 with Caldwell, Dorman, and Rhino, being joined first by Jason Cahoon and later with Willy Daffern as vocalist. They recorded the band's third album Dawn Explosion on Warner Bros., but broke up in 1978.

Caldwell and Rhino reformed Captain Beyond in 1998, with Jimi Interval on vocals, Dan Frye on keyboards, and Jeff Artabasy on bass. In 1999, Swedish record label Record Heaven released a tribute to Captain Beyond entitled Thousand Days of Yesterday. The album features fellow 1970s rockers Pentagram playing "Dancing Madly Backwards". In 2000 they released a four track EP entitled Night Train Calling. Shortly thereafter they were joined briefly by guitarist Steve Petrey.

Captain Beyond once again disbanded in 2003 when lead guitarist Larry Reinhardt developed cancer. Following treatment, Reinhardt continued to perform music until late 2011, when he again fell ill. He died on January 2, 2012. Bassist Lee Dorman died on December 21, 2012. Rod Evans has retired from performing, partly due to legal troubles with his original Deep Purple bandmates, and his current residence is still unknown. However, Caldwell mentioned in a 2015 interview that Evans was doing just fine and was working in the field of respiratory therapy.

Caldwell resurrected the band in 2013, with a lineup consisting of Don Bonzi, Jeff "Boday" Christensen, and Jamie Holka, bassist Allen Carmen, and guitarist/keyboardist/vocalist Simon Lind. In 2015 Carmen and Christensen departed the band and Artabasy returned as bassist. The reformed group began touring in 2015.

== Personnel ==
=== Members ===
Current members

- Bobby Caldwell – drums, percussion (1971–1973, 1973, 1976–1978, 1998–2003, 2013–present)
- Jeff Artabasy – bass (1998–2003, 2015–present)
- Don Bonzi – guitar (2013–present)
- Jamie Holka – guitar (2013–present)
- Simon Lind – guitar, keyboards, vocals (2013–present)

Former members

- Lee Dorman – bass (1971–1973, 1973, 1976–1978)
- Rod Evans – vocals (1971–1973, 1973)
- Lewie Gold – keyboards (1971)
- Larry "Rhino" Reinhardt – guitar (1971–1973, 1973, 1976–1978, 1998–2003)
- Guille Garcia – percussion (1973)
- Brian Glascock – drums (1973)
- Reese Wynans – keyboards (1973)
- Marty Rodriguez – drums (1973)
- Jason Cahoon – vocals (1976)
- Willy Daffern – vocals (1976–1978)
- Dan Frye – keyboards (1998–2003)
- Jimi Interval – vocals (1998–2003)
- Steve Petrey – guitar (2000–2001)
- Allen Carmen – bass (2013–2015)
- Jeff "Boday" Christensen – guitar (2013–2015)

=== Lineups ===
Dates	Lineup	Recordings
1971	Rod Evans – vocals; Larry "Rhino" Reinhardt – guitars; Lewie Gold – keyboards; Lee Dorman – bass; Bobby Caldwell – drums, percussion	
1971–1973	Rod Evans – lead vocals; Larry "Rhino" Reinhardt – guitars; Lee Dorman – bass, backing vocals, piano; Bobby Caldwell – drums, backing vocals, percussion, piano	Captain Beyond (1972); Live Anthology (2013) (Live in Montreux – September 18, 1971); Live in Miami August 19, 1972 (2019); Live in New York – July 30th, 1972 (2019); Live in Montreux 1972: 04.30.72 (2016); Lost & Found 1972-1973 (2017)
1973	Rod Evans – vocals; Larry "Rhino" Reinhardt – guitars; Lee Dorman – bass; Reese Wynans – keyboards; Brian Glascock – drums; Guille Garcia – percussion	
1973	Rod Evans – lead vocals; Larry "Rhino" Reinhardt – guitars; Lee Dorman – bass; Reese Wynans – keyboards; Guille Garcia – percussion; Marty Rodriguez – drums, backing vocals	Sufficiently Breathless (1973)
1973	Disbanded	
1973	Rod Evans – vocals; Larry "Rhino" Reinhardt – guitars; Lee Dorman – bass; Bobby Caldwell – drums, percussion	Far Beyond a Distant Sun – Live Arlington, Texas (1973)
1973-1976	Disbanded	
1976	Larry "Rhino" Reinhardt – guitars; Lee Dorman – bass; Bobby Caldwell – drums, percussion; Jason Cahoon – vocals	
1976–1978	Larry "Rhino" Reinhardt – guitars; Lee Dorman – bass, backing vocals, synthesizer; Bobby Caldwell – drums, backing vocals, percussion; Willy Daffern – lead vocals	Dawn Explosion (1977); Live Anthology (2013) (Live in Los Angeles – May 26, 1977)
1978–1998	Disbanded	
1998–2000	Larry "Rhino" Reinhardt – guitars; Bobby Caldwell – drums, lead vocals, percussion; Jeff Artabasy – bass, backing vocals, percussion; Dan Frye – keyboards; Jimi Interval – lead vocals	Night Train Calling (2000)
2000-2001	Larry "Rhino" Reinhardt – guitar; Bobby Caldwell – drums, percussion; Jeff Artabasy – bass; Dan Frye – keyboards; Jimi Interval – vocals; Steve Petrey – guitar	
2001-2003	Larry "Rhino" Reinhardt – guitar; Bobby Caldwell – drums, percussion; Jeff Artabasy – bass; Dan Frye – keyboards; Jimi Interval – vocals	
2003-2013	Disbanded	
2013-2015	Bobby Caldwell – drums, percussion; Don Bonzi – guitar; Allen Carmen – bass; Jeff "Boday" Christensen – guitar; Jamie Holka – guitar; Simon Lind – guitar, keyboards, vocals	
2015–present	Bobby Caldwell – drums, percussion; Don Bonzi – guitar; Jamie Holka – guitar; Simon Lind – guitar, keyboards, vocals; Jeff Artabasy – bass	

== Discography ==
=== Studio albums ===
==== LPs ====
- Captain Beyond (1972)
- Sufficiently Breathless (1973)
- Dawn Explosion (1977)

==== EP ====
- Night Train Calling (2000)

=== Live releases ===
- Far Beyond a Distant Sun – Live Arlington, Texas (1973)
  - Frozen Over Live (1973, Bootleg Version)
  - Live In Texas - October 6, 1973 (Official Bootleg, 2013 Reissue)
- Live Anthology (Official Bootleg, 2013)
- Live In Montreux 1972: 04.30.72 (2016)
- Live In Miami August 19, 1972 (2019)
- Live In New York - July 30th, 1972 (2019)

=== Compilations ===
- Lost & Found 1972-1973 (2017)

=== Covers and tribute releases ===
- Thousand Days of Yesterdays (1999)
- In 1985 US Hi-NRG outfit The Flirts released a single entitled "Dancing Madly Backwards" (Germany No. 46, US Dance No. 47). Although musically and lyrically totally different, its chorus is lifted directly from "Dancing Madly Backwards (On a Sea of Air)" off Captain Beyond's first album.
