= Ball (Iron Butterfly album) =

Album by Iron Butterfly

Studio album by Iron Butterfly
- Released: January 17, 1969
- Recorded: 1968
- Studio: Gold Star, Hollywood; The Hit Factory, New York City
- Genre: Psychedelic rock; acid rock; proto-metal
- Length: 35:00
- Label: Atco
- Producer: Jim Hilton

Iron Butterfly chronology
| In-A-Gadda-Da-Vida (1968) | Ball (1969) | Live (1970) |

Singles from Ball
- 1. "Soul Experience" Released: February 1969; 2. "In The Time Of Our Lives" Released: May 1969

Ball is the third studio album by the rock band Iron Butterfly, released on January 17, 1969. After the enormous success of In-A-Gadda-Da-Vida, Iron Butterfly modified its acid-rock sound somewhat and experimented with more melodic compositions. The band's trademark heavy guitars, however, are still evident on such tracks as "In the Time of Our Lives" and "It Must Be Love". The album reached number 3 on the Billboard 200 charts, making Ball more immediately successful than In-A-Gadda-Da-Vida. In Canada the album reached number 4. Ball was certified Gold in March 1969. It also spawned two minor hit singles: "Soul Experience" (b/w "In the Crowds"), an uncharacteristically uplifting song for the group, went to number 75 on the Billboard charts and number 50 in Canada, and despite its nightmarish musical tones and morbid lyrics, "In the Time of Our Lives" (b/w "It Must Be Love") managed to reach number 96 and number 81 in Canada. This is the second and final studio album to feature the famous lineup of Ingle, Bushy, Dorman and Brann.

In 1999, Collector's Choice Music released Ball with two bonus tracks, "I Can't Help But Deceive You Little Girl" and "To Be Alone", which were both recorded during the same era as Ball (although not necessarily during the same recording sessions) and were previously released as the two sides of a 7" single. "I Can't Help But Deceive You Little Girl" had also been released on the 1993 compilation Light & Heavy: The Best of Iron Butterfly.

== Reception ==
Professional ratings
Review scores
| Source | Rating |
|---|---|
| AllMusic | 3/5 stars |
| Encyclopedia of Popular Music | 4/5 stars |
| The Rolling Stone Album Guide | 1/5 stars |

AllMusic rated Ball three out of five stars.

== Track listing ==
=== Side one ===
1. "In the Time of Our Lives" (Doug Ingle, Ron Bushy) – 4:49
2. "Soul Experience" (Ingle, Bushy, Erik Brann, Lee Dorman) – 2:50
3. "Lonely Boy" (Ingle) – 4:57
4. "Real Fright" (Ingle, Bushy, Brann) (Note: There is considerable confusion around the authorship of "Real Fright". The credit of (Ingle, Bushy, Brann) given on the album itself seemingly contradicts the fact that the song dates back to Iron Butterfly's early days, long before Erik Brann was associated with the group. A July 1967 live recording of "Real Fright" which appears on the album Live at the Galaxy 1967 seems identical to the version on Ball in terms of composition, apparently eliminating the possibility that Brann made changes to the song after he joined. Moreover, the song was registered with BMI twice, with two completely different songwriter credits, neither of which matches the credit given on the album. The first time, BMI Work #1232752, the song was credited to Ingle and Brann. The second time, BMI Work #1232753, the song was credited to Danny Weis and Darryl DeLoach (the original guitarist and tambourine player of Iron Butterfly, respectively.)) – 2:40
5. "In the Crowds" (Ingle, Dorman) – 2:10

=== Side two ===
6. "It Must Be Love" (Ingle) – 4:23
7. "Her Favorite Style" (Ingle) – 3:13
8. "Filled with Fear" (Ingle) – 3:46
9. "Belda-Beast" (Brann) – 5:46

=== 1999 CD reissue bonus tracks ===
10. "I Can't Help but Deceive You Little Girl" (Ingle) – 3:34
11. "To Be Alone" (Ingle, Robert Woods Edmondson) – 3:05

== Personnel ==
=== Iron Butterfly ===
- Erik Brann – guitars, backing vocals, co-lead vocals on “Real Fright”, lead vocals on "Belda-Beast"
- Doug Ingle – organs, lead vocals (except on "Belda-Beast"), backing vocals on "Belda Beast"
- Lee Dorman – bass, backing vocals
- Ron Bushy – drums, percussion

=== Technical ===
- Jim Hilton – producer, engineer
- Joel Brodsky – photography

== Certifications ==
| Region | Certification | Certified units/sales |
|---|---|---|
| United States (RIAA) | Gold | 500,000^{^} |
^{^} Shipments figures based on certification alone.

== Singles ==
=== US and overseas singles ===
- "Soul Experience" b/w "In the Crowds" (No. 75 on the Billboard Hot 100)
- "In the Time of Our Lives" b/w "It Must Be Love" (No. 96 on the Billboard Hot 100)

=== UK-only singles ===
- "Belda-Beast" (4:59 edit) b/w "Lonely Boy"

=== Post-album singles ===
- "I Can't Help but Deceive You Little Girl" b/w "To Be Alone"
