= Philip Taylor Kramer =

American bassist

- Born: July 12, 1952; Youngstown, Ohio, US
- Instrument: Bass
- Formerly of: Iron Butterfly
- Disappeared: c. February 12, 1995 (aged 42); Los Angeles County/Ventura County, California, US
- Status: Found
- Cause of death: Probable suicide

Philip Taylor Kramer (July 12, 1952 – c. February 12, 1995) was an American bass guitar player for the rock group Iron Butterfly and associated groups between 1974 and 1980. He later became a computer engineering executive and inventor. He disappeared in February 1995 and was found dead in May 1999.

== Early life and music career ==
Philip Taylor Kramer was born in 1952 in Youngstown, Ohio. In 1974, he joined Iron Butterfly as its bass player, playing on two of the group's albums, Scorching Beauty and Sun and Steel, both released in 1975. After the breakup of Iron Butterfly, Kramer continued to play with founding member Ron Bushy in the groups Magic and Gold between 1977 and 1980.

== Engineering career ==
Kramer would complete a degree in aerospace engineering. He worked on the MX missile guidance system for a contractor of the US Department of Defense and later in the computer industry on fractal compression, facial recognition systems, and advanced communications.

A technician for the band Iron Butterfly introduced Taylor to the math of Benoit Mandelbrot when his book on fractals came out in 1978. Since fractals uses iteration math, they looked at using it for what they called 'fractal resolution' of images using the math of Koch Curves or Cantor Dust, for what is now referred to today as 'fractal compression'.

Kramer, the son of a professor of electrical engineering, had a lifelong interest in science and mathematical theorems. In 1964, at the age of 12, he won the science fair at Liberty School in Youngstown, Ohio, by building a laser with a beam strong enough to pop a balloon. In 1990, at the age of 38, Kramer co-founded Total Multimedia Inc. with Randy Jackson (brother of Michael Jackson) to develop data compression techniques for CD-ROMs. The firm claims it developed the first video compression capable of producing full motion video from a single speed CD-ROM in 1992. In 1994 the company was reorganized under bankruptcy and hired new leadership. Kramer continued working there until his disappearance, though he was profoundly affected by the bankruptcy and reorganization. Kramer co-developed SoftVideo based on fractal compression and he also claimed to work on a transmission project that would result in faster-than-light speed communications. The latter related to his father Ray's long-running family effort to discredit Albert Einstein's theories.

== Death and investigation ==
On February 12, 1995, Kramer drove to Los Angeles International Airport to pick up a business associate and the associate's wife. The business associate had been a principal investor in Total Multimedia and also a principal instigator of its bankruptcy reorganization. On his way to the airport, Kramer telephoned his wife to advise her that plans had changed, and that the business associate and his wife should go directly from the airport to a hotel, where Kramer and his wife would meet them later. Kramer nonetheless appears to have spent forty-five minutes at the airport, for unexplained reasons.

During his travel to and from the airport, Kramer made a flurry of cell phone calls, including calls to his wife, Ron Bushy and finally to the police. In the latter call, Kramer said, "I'm going to kill myself. And I want everyone to know O. J. Simpson is innocent. They did it." Prior to his disappearance, Kramer was hired to analyze the authenticity of a video tape that the FBI and the DEA had on the O. J. Simpson murder trial.

Kramer was never heard from again. His disappearance led to a massive search, many news reports, and talk show segments including an episode of The Oprah Winfrey Show, America's Most Wanted, The Unexplained ("Strange Disappearances," first aired June 7, 2000) and Unsolved Mysteries (Season 8 Episode 3). An article in Skeptic Vol. 4, No. 2, 1996, by Fredric L. Rice reported numerous conspiracy theories about his death. In the beginning of the March 6, 1997, episode of Coast to Coast AM, remote viewer Ed Dames told Kathy Kramer-Peterssen, Phil's sister, that his team's findings were that Phil was murdered, the body was buried but quickly decayed due to water, and it was brought to Montana from California. More recently, the mysterious disappearance of Kramer was highlighted in an episode titled "CONSPIRACY: Philip Taylor Kramer" on an audio podcast named "Supernatural with Ashley Flowers", released on August 24, 2021. The office of Ohio Congressman James Traficant investigated Kramer's case, and twice asked the FBI to look into it. The FBI did not believe there was enough reason to launch a separate criminal investigation of its own, although it assisted the Ventura County sheriff's office.

=== Discovery ===
On May 29, 1999, Kramer's Ford Aerostar minivan and skeletal remains were found by photographers looking for old car wrecks to shoot at the bottom of Decker Canyon near Malibu, California. However, his father never believed he killed himself and is quoted as saying, "Taylor had told me a long time before there were people bothering him. They wanted what he was doing and some of them threatened him. He once told me that if I ever say I'm gonna kill myself, don't you believe it one bit. I'll be needing help."

== See also ==
- Lists of solved missing person cases
