= Iron Butterfly =

American rock group

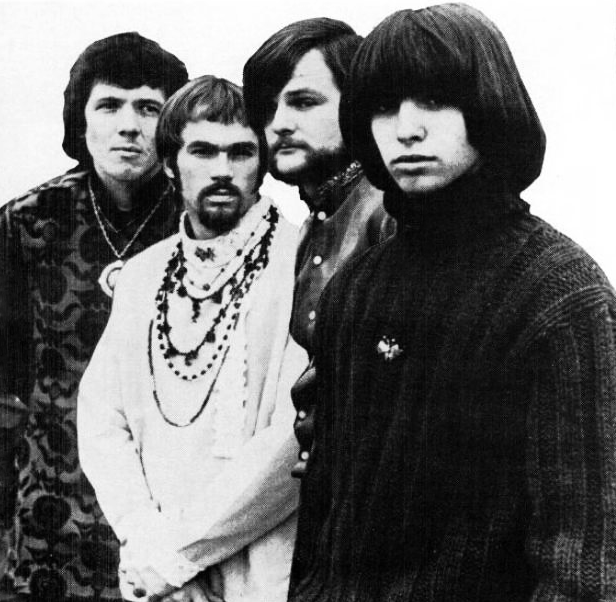
- Classic lineup of Iron Butterfly in 1969: from left to right Doug Ingle, Ron Bushy, Lee Dorman, Erik Brann

Background information
- Origin: San Diego, California, U.S.
- Genres: Acid rock; hard rock; psychedelic rock; progressive rock
- Years active: 1966–1971; 1974–1985; 1987–2012; 2015–2021; 2024
- Labels: Atco; MCA; Purple Pyramid
- Past members: See "Personnel"
- Website: ironbutterfly.com

Iron Butterfly is an American rock band formed in San Diego, California, in 1966. They are best known for the 1968 hit "In-A-Gadda-Da-Vida", providing a dramatic sound that led the way towards the development of hard rock and heavy metal music. Although their heyday was the late 1960s, the band has been reformed with various members with varying levels of success with no new recordings since 1975. Their second album, In-A-Gadda-Da-Vida (1968), remains a best-seller, and Iron Butterfly was the first group to receive an in-house platinum album award from Atlantic Records.

According to music critic Manish Agarwal of Time Out, "Iron Butterfly blended hard rock with ordinate, acid-friendly textures." Mark Deming of AllMusic stated that they were one of the first musical groups to fuse the two styles in this way, and described their sound as a "blend of trippy musical exploration and open-ended jams with a hard, distorted attack".

== History ==
=== Formation and Heavy (1966–1968) ===
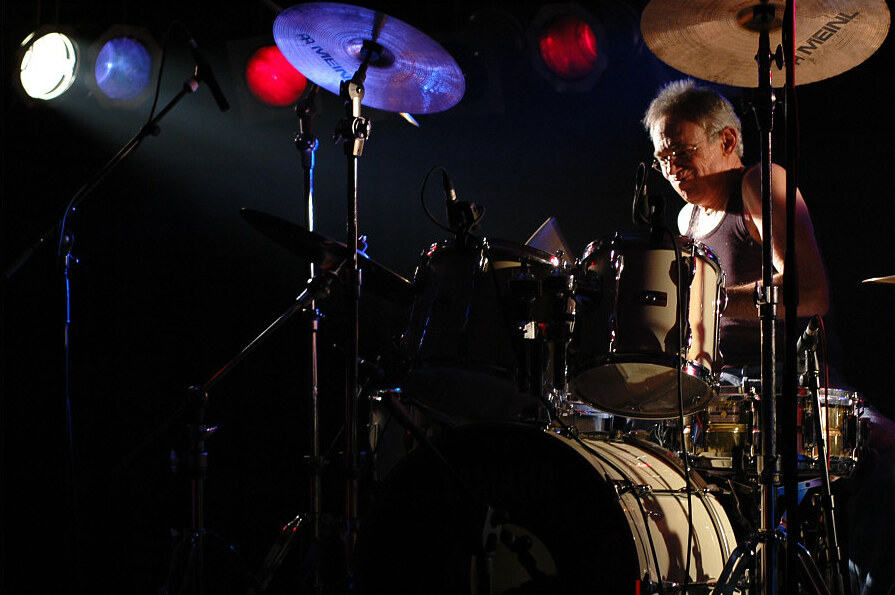
Ron Bushy, Iron Butterfly performing "In a Gadda da Vida", Germany, May 2005

The band formed in 1966 in San Diego. The original members were Doug Ingle (vocals, organ, formerly of Jeri and the Jeritones and Palace Pages, Iron Butterfly's forerunner), Jack Pinney (drums), Greg Willis (bass), and Danny Weis (guitar, also of Palace Pages). The group were soon joined by vocalist and tambourine player Darryl DeLoach. DeLoach's parents’ garage served as the site for their almost nightly rehearsals.

Jerry Penrod replaced Willis after the band relocated to Los Angeles in the summer of 1966. Pinney eventually left to return to school. Bruce Morse then replaced Pinney until Ron Bushy (from a group called the Voxmen) joined when Morse left due to a family emergency. A booking at Bido Lito's club in Hollywood soon led to regular appearances at the Galaxy Club and the Whisky a Go Go.

In early 1968, after the band signed a deal with Atco Records, an Atlantic Records subsidiary, the band's debut album Heavy was released. The group was signed and managed by Atlantic's Charles Greene and Brian Stone, who were co-producers of Heavy. All but Ingle and Bushy left the band after completing the album in the late summer of 1967. The two remaining musicians, faced with the possibility of the record not being released, quickly found replacements in bassist Lee Dorman and 17-year-old guitarist Erik Brann (also known as "Erik Braunn" and "Erik Braun") and resumed touring. In a 1986 interview with IB's fan club fanzine, The Butterfly Net, Brann stated that Jeff Beck, Neil Young, and Michael Monarch (who would go on to join Steppenwolf) had also expressed interest in joining the group to replace Weis.

After Brann was chosen, Penrod and DeLoach, uncomfortable with Brann's young age and frustrated with the time it was taking him to learn the band's repertoire, left the group after Weis did. Weis and Penrod went on to form the group Rhinoceros. In 1970 DeLoach formed Flintwhistle along with Jerry Penrod and Erik Brann. They performed live for about a year before breaking up.

=== Success with In-A-Gadda-Da-Vida and first breakup (1968–1971) ===
"In-A-Gadda-Da-Vida", the 17-minute title track of Iron Butterfly's second album of the same name, became a top-30 hit (edited down to 2:52 minutes) in the United States. The single was certified gold by the Recording Industry Association of America (RIAA) in December 1968 for shipments of 1 million units in the U.S. The album stayed on the Billboard charts for 140 weeks and has been certified 4× platinum by the RIAA for sales of 4 million copies in the U.S.

During this time, the band was represented by the William Morris Agency, which booked all their live concerts. Iron Butterfly played its first national tour in the summer of 1968 alongside Jefferson Airplane. By the end of 1968, the band was back in the studio at work on their next album. Iron Butterfly's third album, Ball, was released in January 1969 and went gold, reaching No. 3 on the Billboard 200 chart.

The band had been booked to play at Woodstock in August 1969 but got stuck at New York City's LaGuardia Airport. They explained their situation to the concert promoters and asked for patience. Their manager, however, sent a telegram demanding that Iron Butterfly be flown in by helicopter, whereupon they would "immediately" take the stage. After their set, they would be paid and flown back to the airport. According to drummer Bushy, "We went down to the Port Authority three times and waited for the helicopter, but it never showed up". Woodstock production coordinator John Morris claims he sent the manager a telegram reading: "For reasons I can't go into / Until you are here / Clarifying your situation / Knowing you are having problems / You will have to find / Other transportation / Unless you plan not to come." The acrostic formed by the first letter of each line in the telegram made it clear that the band was not welcome.

Erik Brann left the band after a final show in San Diego on December 13, 1969. Brann was frustrated with the band's unwillingness to move towards a harder rock sound. He was replaced in the line-up by two new musicians: guitarist/vocalist Mike Pinera (whose Blues Image had opened for Iron Butterfly's Vida tour) and guitarist Larry Reinhardt (from the Allman Brothers Band forerunner Second Coming). Both Pinera and Larry "Rhino" Reinhardt had been rehearsing secretly with the band since September 1969 after Brann had voiced his objections to continuing. In August 1970 Iron Butterfly released its fourth studio album Metamorphosis. The album managed to get into the Billboard top 20.

While Iron Butterfly was touring in Europe with Yes in early 1971, Doug Ingle announced his intention to leave the group. Ingle had grown tired of endless touring and wasn't totally on board with the band's new guitar-oriented blues and soul direction. The remaining four members cut the 45 rpm single, "Silly Sally" (with Bushy eventually being replaced on the record by a session drummer, at the producer's prompting). Putting forth a horn-based sound more characteristic of groups like Blood, Sweat & Tears, the single failed to chart and proved to be their last recording before their mid-1970s reformation.

The band, with Ingle in tow, decided to play one final tour, pairing with Black Oak Arkansas. Pinera's band-mate from Blues Image, drummer Manny Bertematti, filled in for Bushy for most of the tour dates because of the latter's shoulder injury. The group then broke up after playing the tour's final show at Central Oregon Community College in Bend, Oregon on May 23, 1971. Another reason for the band not continuing at this time, according to a later interview by Pinera, was the U.S. Internal Revenue Service's effort to collect unpaid taxes.

Dorman and Reinhardt subsequently founded Captain Beyond.

=== Reunions (1974–2011) ===
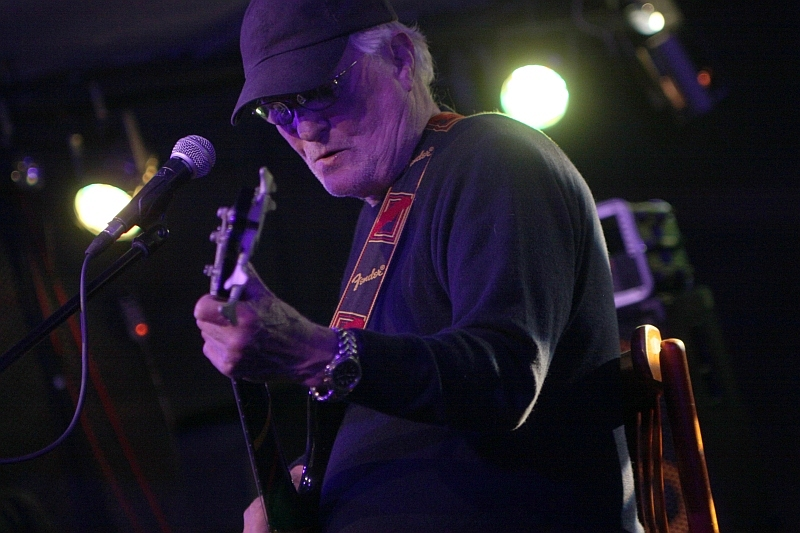
Bassist Lee Dorman in Prague on March 11, 2012

In 1974 Brann was contacted by a promoter about reforming Iron Butterfly, so he reunited with Ron Bushy to form a new version of the group, signing with MCA Records and joined by Bushy's friend, bassist Philip Taylor Kramer, and keyboardist Howard Reitzes, a friend of Brann's who worked in a music store. Brann, who had done occasional lead vocals during Iron Butterfly's original run, served as the band's main lead vocalist this time. Their first album for MCA, Scorching Beauty, was released in January 1975, and Reitzes was replaced by Bill DeMartines just after its release. The new lineup toured throughout the year and released Sun and Steel in October 1975 with DeMartines now on keyboards. Both albums were criticized for bearing little resemblance to the original tone of the group and sold poorly compared to their earlier releases.

In 1977 the Bushy/Brann/Kramer/DeMartines grouping wound down after being plagued with bad management and tour dates that had started off in theaters but ended up in bars and clubs. Bushy, Kramer and DeMartines formed Magic and Lee Dorman put together a new IB lineup with Rhino that contained British singer Jimi Henderson, Larry Kiernan on keyboards, David Love on guitar and Kevin Karamitros on drums. This grouping toured mostly in the South. By 1978 the lineup was Dorman, Karamitros, Pinera and John Leimseider on keyboards.

In the late fall of 1978, a German promoter made an offer for the band to tour. The Metamorphosis lineup (Ingle, Bushy, Dorman, Pinera and Rhino) made preparations, but just before they were to depart for Germany, Dorman's father took ill and another bassist, Keith Ellis (formerly of Boxer), was brought in to cover for Dorman in case he had to suddenly return to the US. During the tour, Ellis died in Darmstadt, Germany, on December 12, 1978.

After their return to the US, the Metamorphosis group played a few homecoming shows in early 1979, joined by Erik Brann for guest appearances. Later in 1979, Bushy returned to his other group, Gold, and the next IB lineup was: Mike Pinera, Lee Dorman, Doug Ingle, a returning John Leimseider and Dorman's Captain Beyond band-mate, drummer Bobby Caldwell. Still later that same year, Bobby Hasbrook, from Hawaii, joined the band as lead guitarist and lead vocals alongside Dorman, Pinera, Caldwell and Leimseider.

IB's lineup was in a constant state of flux from late 1979 on as exhibited in the following groupings: Brann, Dorman, Leimseider, Caldwell and Hasbrook (1979); Pinera, Brann, Dorman, Hasbrook, Caldwell and Nathan Pino – keyboards (1979); Dorman, Brann, Hasbrook, Tim Kislan – keyboards, Zam Johnson – drums and Starz Vanderlocket – vocals, percussion (1980); Dorman, Rhino, Leimseider, Randy Skirvin – guitar, Jimmy Rock – drums and Luke – vocals, percussion (1981–1982); Pinera, Dorman, Rhino, Guy Babylon – keyboards and Jan Uvena – drums (1982) plus Pinera, Dorman, Rhino, Babylon and Bushy (1982).

On July 31, 1982, the Pinera, Dorman, Rhino, Babylon and Bushy lineup went into Music Sound Connection Studio in Studio City, California, to record some material, none of which has ever been released.

At the tail end of 1982, Ingle returned to the fold once more as John Shearer (from Steve Hackett's band) came in on drums and percussionist Luke also rejoined since Bushy had taken a sales job outside of music for Makita Tools. Brann (who had guested at some shows during 1982) soon ended his association with the band as well. At one show on October 21, 1982, at Gazzarri's in West Hollywood, their support act was Spinal Tap, however Iron Butterfly ended up going on first as Dorman had a dental procedure earlier in the day and was not feeling well.

Pinera left again, as did Luke, in 1983 and IB worked on some more material in September of that year, with drummer Jerry Sommers playing on some tracks. But once again, nothing ever came of it.

Then Ingle, Dorman, Rhino and drummer Rick Rotante undertook the "Wings of Flight Tour" in early 1984, with Lenny Campanero (ex-Badfinger) replacing Rotante for more recording sessions at Salty Dog Studios in Van Nuys, California.

The "Legends Tour" took place in the fall of 1984 with Ingle, Dorman, Campanero and guitarist Steve Fister (later of Steppenwolf) and another Steppenwolf alumnus, bassist Kurtis Teel, took Dorman's spot for the "Phoenix Tour" in the fall of '85, which ended in late November, shortly after which, Teel suddenly died of a heart murmur on December 2. The group then disbanded once again due to managerial problems.

In the spring of 1987, Bushy and Pinera got back together to tour as Iron Butterfly for the "Wings of Flight 87" tour (Dorman was captaining a fishing boat, so was not available at this time) with Ace Baker (keyboards) and Kelly Reubens (bass). Tim Von Hoffman and Glen Rappold (guitar, bass) soon replaced Ace Baker and drummer Donny Vosburgh (who'd been in Thee Image with Pinera) guested at some of these 1987 shows and subbed for Bushy on others. But this was short-lived, as Bushy and then Brann both rehearsed different IB lineups in August and September of that year (see Lineups below) that never made it to the concert stage.

In December 1987 the "classic lineup" of Ingle, Brann, Dorman and Bushy got together at The Roxy Theatre to prepare for a thirty date tour of the East Coast in the winter and spring of 1988 that culminated with an appearance at Atlantic Records 40th Anniversary celebration at Madison Square Garden on May 14, 1988, alongside Led Zeppelin and many others.

After this, Brann and Dorman decided to continue on, bringing in Rhino, keyboardist Derek Hilland and drummer Sal Rodriguez (replaced by Kenny Suarez). They were joined by singer/frontman Steve "Mick" Feldman and backup singers JoAnne Kurman-Montana and Cecelia Noel also appeared with the band for a few shows in 1989, as well as another drummer, Doug Freedman, who subbed for Suarez in the fall of '89. The 1989 IB lineup of Brann, Dorman, Rhino, Hilland, Feldman and Suarez appeared at Woodstock '89, which took place in August 1989 twenty years to the day of and on the site of the original Woodstock concert of 1969 as a spontaneous celebration of the event's 20th anniversary.

In 1990 after Brann fell out with the others and left Iron Butterfly for good, Dorman, Rhino, Hilland and Suarez recorded an album with singer Robert Tepper that was meant to be an IB album called We Will Rise but instead was shelved and eventually reworked into Tepper's 1996 solo album, No Rest For The Wounded Heart.

After the Tepper-led lineup failed to break through, Tepper left to continue his solo career and Dorman, Rhino and Bushy went back on the road in early 1993 with keyboardist Burt Diaz. But after Rhino and Diaz decided to leave, Pinera was brought back, along with keyboardist Hilland. Pinera, by this time, had formed his own group, the Classic Rock All-Stars, so was not available for all of the Butterfly's shows. Guitarist Denny Artache (summer 1993), then Doug Bossey (1994), filled in until Pinera was dropped in 1994, with Bossey, then Eric Barnett finally taking over (in 1995).

Doug Ingle rejoined the band in July 1994. In the spring of 1997 the band did a tour of Europe with "classic era" members Ingle, Bushy and Dorman, along with Hilland and Barnett. A DVD of live performances from this tour was released in 2008. Hilland was dropped in 1997 and Ingle officially retired from performing in early 1999. Ingle died in May 2024. Singer/keysman Damian Bujanda had a brief tenure, but after leaving for personal reasons, Larry Rust joined the band as vocalist/keyboardist from 1999 to 2005.

In 2001, after Dorman took ill, one of the band's road crew, Oly Larios, sat in on bass.

Guitarist/vocalist Charlie Marinkovich joined the band in 2002. Originally from Seattle, Marinkovich had played with Randy Hansen and others.

Original vocalist Darryl DeLoach (born on September 12, 1947) died of liver cancer on October 2, 2002, at age 55.

On July 25, 2003, Erik Brann died of heart failure at the age of 52.

Derek Hilland returned to play keyboards for the group's 2003 dates when Larry Rust was not available.

Larry Rust parted ways with the band in 2005 and was replaced by German violinist, keyboardist, and composer Martin Gerschwitz, who had formerly worked with Lita Ford, Meat Loaf, Walter Trout, and most recently Eric Burdon and The Animals.

In early 2010, an announcement was made that Iron Butterfly would receive the Lifetime Achievement Award at the 20th Annual San Diego Music Awards, which took place on September 12, 2010. The award was presented by San Diego Mayor Jerry Sanders. Later the same year, Ray Weston (formerly of Wishbone Ash) came in to substitute on drums for Ron Bushy after he was sidelined by health issues.

In early 2012, Phil Parlapiano substituted for Martin Gerschwitz for a few shows when Gerschwitz was unable to play due to his own solo-tour schedule.

=== Deaths of Reinhardt and Dorman, and inactivity (2012–2014) ===
Former guitarist Larry "Rhino" Reinhardt died on January 2, 2012, at the age of 63, due to cirrhosis of the liver. Bassist Lee Dorman, who had a history of heart trouble, died on December 21, 2012, at the age of 70. Both Reinhardt and Dorman were also founding members of Captain Beyond.

Following Dorman's death, Iron Butterfly dissolved once more. Charlie Marinkovich revealed in 2013 that he had departed the band altogether and that Ron Bushy was very ill, shrouding the band's future in doubt. At times during his recovery in 2014, Ron Bushy entertained the idea of putting a new Iron Butterfly band together, possibly with Martin Gerschwitz returning on keyboards and lead vocals.

=== Third reunion/tribute band and deaths of Ron Bushy, Doug Ingle and Mike Pinera (2015–present) ===
In late 2014, reports surfaced of the band reforming, with a lineup consisting of Bushy, Mike Pinera, Doug Ingle Jr. on keyboards and an unnamed bassist. However, this reformation did not come to fruition and in 2015 the band unveiled a lineup consisting of Bushy and returning guitarist Eric Barnett, along with new members Mike Green (vocals, percussion), Dave Meros (bass), Phil Parlapiano (vocals, keyboards) and Ray Weston (drums). Meros, Parlapiano and Weston had all previously played with Iron Butterfly as substitute musicians; Meros for Dorman (in 2006) Parlapiano for Gerschwitz (in 2012) and Weston for Bushy (in 2010) respectively. Gerschwitz came back to replace Parlapiano on keyboards in 2018.

At that time, Ron Bushy was still involved with Iron Butterfly, but was retired from performing due to his health concerns. This left Weston as the only active drummer in the band at all appearances from the 2015 reunion through the end of 2019. In the summer of 2018, Bushy made a rare guest appearance with the band at a gig in California. This turned out to be his first performance on stage with Iron Butterfly since 2012 and his very last one with the band.

Former Butterfly keyboardist Larry Rust died peacefully at his home near Los Angeles on November 25, 2016, at the age of 63. Founding bassist Greg Willis died on November 11, 2016. A tribute concert was staged November 30 at Nicky Rottens in El Cajon.

On January 15, 2020 the Official Iron Butterfly website and their booking agent announced the lineup of the band for 2020: Eric Barnett (guitar, vocals), Dave Meros (bass, vocals), Bernie Pershey (drums, percussion), Martin Gerschwitz (keyboards, vocals), with occasional guests or fill in musicians being Ron Bushy (drums, percussion), Ray Weston (drums, percussion) and Michael Thomas Franklin (keyboards).

On August 29, 2021 Iron Butterfly issued a statement that Bushy had died that morning at the UCLA Medical Center in Santa Monica following a battle with esophageal cancer, at the age of 79. Shortly after his passing, the band disbanded.

Doug Ingle died on May 24, 2024, at the age of 78. He was the last surviving member of the classic Iron Butterfly lineup that performed on the In-A-Gadda-Da-Vida album.

Mike Pinera died on November 20, 2024, of liver cancer, aged 76. Pinera was the last surviving member of the Iron Butterfly lineup that performed on Metamorphosis.

On October 19, 2024 a reunited Iron Butterfly headlined the HRH Prog14 festival with a lineup that included Eric Barnett, Bernie Pershey, Jawn Star (keyboards, vocals, formerly with Player ) and Dave Wishton (bass, vocals). This was their first performance since 2021.

== Personnel ==
=== Classic lineup ===
- Doug Ingle – organ, vocals (1966–1971, 1978–1979, 1983–1985, 1987–1988, 1994–1999; died 2024)
- Ron Bushy – drums, percussion (1966–1977, 1978–1979, 1982, 1987–1988, 1993–2012; 2015–2021; his death)
- Erik Brann – guitar, vocals (1967–1969, 1974–1977, 1978–1979, 1979–1980, 1982, 1987, 1987–1989; died 2003)
- Lee Dorman – bass, backing vocals (1967–1971, 1977–1978, 1978–1985, 1987–2012; his death)

=== Current touring lineup ===
- Eric Barnett – guitar, vocals (1995–2002, 2015–2021, 2024–present)
- Bernie Pershey – drums (2020–2021, 2024–present)
- Dave Whiston – bass, vocals (2024–present)
- Jawn Star – keyboards, vocals (2024–present)

=== Other members ===
- Jack Pinney – drums, percussion (1966)
- Danny Weis – guitar (1966–1967)
- Greg Willis – bass (1966)
- Darryl DeLoach – tambourine, vocals (1966–1967; died 2002)
- Bruce Morse – drums, percussion (1966)
- Jerry Penrod – bass, backing vocals (1966–1967)
- Mike Pinera – guitar, vocals (1970–1972, 1978–1979, 1982, 1987, 1993; died 2024)
- Larry "Rhino" Reinhardt – guitar (1969–1971, 1977–1978, 1978–1979, 1981–1984, 1988–1993; died 2012)
- Philip Taylor Kramer – bass, keyboards, vocals (1974–1977; died 1995)
- Howard Reitzes – keyboards, vocals (1974–1975)
- Bill DeMartines – keyboards, vocals (1975–1977, 1987)
- Kevin Karamitros – drums (1977–1978)
- Jimi Henderson – vocals (1977–1978)
- Larry Kiernan – keyboards (1977–1978)
- David Love – guitar (1977–1978)
- John Leimseider – keyboards (1978, 1979, 1981–1982)
- Keith Ellis – bass (1978; his death)
- Bobby Caldwell – drums, percussion (1979, substitute 1984)
- Bobby Hasbrook – guitar, vocals (1979–1982)
- Nathan Pino – keyboards (1979)
- Zam Johnson – drums, percussion (1980)
- Tim Kislan – keyboards (1980)
- Starz Vanderlocket – percussion, vocals (1980)
- Luke – percussion, vocals (1981–1982, 1982–1983)
- Jimmy Rock – drums (1981–1982)
- Randy Skirvin – guitar, vocals (1981–1982)
- Guy Babylon – keyboards (1982–1983; died 2009)
- Jan Uvena – drums, percussion (1982)
- John Shearer – drums (1982–1983)
- Jerry Sommers – drums, percussion (1983)
- Rick Rotante – drums, percussion (1983–1984)
- Lenny Campanero – drums (1984–1985)
- Steve Fister – guitar, backing vocals (1984–1985)
- Kurtis Teel – bass (1985)
- Kelly Reubens – bass (1987)
- Tim Von Hoffman – keyboards (1987)
- Glen Rappold – guitar, bass, vocals (1987)
- Ace Baker – keyboards (1987)
- Sal Rodriguez – drums (1987, 1988)
- Jim Von Buelow – guitar (1987)
- Bob Birch – bass (1987; died 2012)
- Doug Jackson – guitar (1987)
- Lyle T. West – vocals (1987)
- Derek Hilland – keyboards, backing vocals (1988–1990, 1993–1997; substitute – 2003)
- Kenny Suarez – drums, percussion (1988–1992)
- Steve "Mick" Feldman – vocals (1988–1990)
- Robert Tepper – vocals (1990–1992)
- Burt Diaz – keyboards (1993)
- Denny Artache – guitar, vocals (1993)
- Doug Bossey – guitar (1994–1995)
- Damian Bujanda – keyboards, vocals (1999)
- Larry Rust – keyboards, vocals (1999–2005)
- Charlie Marinkovich – guitar, vocals (2002–2012)
- Martin Gerschwitz – keyboards, vocals (2005–2012, 2018–2021)
- Phil Parlapiano – keyboards, vocals (2015–2018, substitute – 2012)
- Michael Green – percussion, vocals (2015–2019)
- Michael Franklin – keys, vocals (2016–2017)
- Ray Weston – drums, percussion (2015–2020; substitute – 2010, 2020)
- Dave Meros – bass (2015–2021; substitute – 2006)
- Tim Franklin – bass, vocals (2016–2017)

Supporting musicians

- Manny Bertematti – drums, percussion (substitute – 1971)
- Donny Vosburgh – drums (guest – 1987)
- Doug Freedman – drums, percussion (substitute – 1989)
- JoAnne Kurman-Montana – backing vocals (live – 1989)
- Cecelia Noel – backing vocals (live – 1989)
- Oly Larios – bass (substitute – 2001)
- Ken Chalupnik – bass (substitute – 2006)

=== Lineups ===
1966	1966	1966	1966–1967
Doug Ingle – organ, vocals; Jack Pinney – drums, percussion; Danny Weis – guitar; Greg Willis – bass	Doug Ingle – organ, vocals; Jack Pinney – drums, percussion; Danny Weis – guitar; Greg Willis – bass; Darryl DeLoach – vocals	Doug Ingle – organ, vocals; Danny Weis – guitar; Darryl DeLoach – tambourine, vocals; Bruce Morse – drums, percussion; Jerry Penrod – bass, backing vocals	Doug Ingle – organ, vocals; Danny Weis – guitar; Darryl DeLoach – tambourine, vocals; Jerry Penrod – bass, backing vocals; Ron Bushy – drums, percussion
1967–1969 (Classic lineup)	1969–1971	1971–1974	1974–1975
Doug Ingle – organ, vocals; Ron Bushy – drums, percussion; Erik Brann – guitar, vocals; Lee Dorman – bass, vocals	Doug Ingle – organ, vocals; Ron Bushy – drums, percussion; Lee Dorman – bass, vocals; Mike Pinera – guitar, vocals; Larry Reinhardt – guitar; Supporting musicians: Manny Bertematti – drums, percussion (substitute – 1971)	Disbanded	Ron Bushy – drums, percussion; Erik Brann – guitar, vocals; Philip Taylor Kramer – bass, keyboards, vocals; Howard Reitzes – keyboards, vocals
1975–1977	1977–1978	1978	1978
Ron Bushy – drums, percussion; Erik Brann – vocals, guitar; Philip Taylor Kramer – bass, keyboards, vocals; Bill DeMartines – keyboards, vocals	Lee Dorman – bass, vocals; Jimi Henderson – vocals; Kevin Karamitros – drums; Larry Kiernan – keyboards; David Love – guitar; Larry "Rhino" Reinhardt – guitar	Lee Dorman – bass, vocals; Kevin Karamitros – drums, percussion; John Leimseider – keyboards; Mike Pinera – guitar, vocals	Mike Pinera – guitar, vocals; Ron Bushy – drums, percussion; Keith Ellis – bass; Doug Ingle – organ, vocals; Larry "Rhino" Reinhardt – guitar
1978	1978–1979	1979	1979
Mike Pinera – guitar, vocals; Ron Bushy – drums, percussion; Doug Ingle – organ, vocals; Larry "Rhino" Reinhardt – guitar; Lee Dorman – bass, vocals	Mike Pinera – guitar, vocals; Ron Bushy – drums, percussion; Doug Ingle – organ, vocals; Larry "Rhino" Reinhardt – guitar; Lee Dorman – bass, vocals; Erik Brann – guitar, vocals	Mike Pinera – guitar, vocals; Doug Ingle – organ, vocals; Lee Dorman – bass, vocals; Bobby Caldwell – drums, percussion; Bobby Hasbrook – guitars, vocals; John Leimseider – keyboards	Lee Dorman – bass, vocals; Bobby Caldwell – drums, percussion; Bobby Hasbrook – guitar, vocals; John Leimseider – keyboards; Erik Brann – guitar, vocals
1979	1980	1981–1982	1982
Lee Dorman – bass, vocals; Bobby Caldwell – drums, percussion; Bobby Hasbrook – guitar, vocals; Erik Brann – guitar, vocals; Mike Pinera – guitar, vocals; Nathan Pino – keyboards	Lee Dorman – bass, vocals; Bobby Hasbrook – guitar, vocals; Erik Brann – guitar, vocals; Zam Johnson – drums, percussion; Tim Kislan – keyboards; Starz Vanderlocket – percussion, vocals	Lee Dorman – bass, vocals; John Leimseider – keyboards; Larry "Rhino" Reinhardt – guitar, vocals; Jimmy Rock – drums; Randy Skirvin – guitar, vocals; Luke – percussion, vocals	Lee Dorman – bass, vocals; Larry "Rhino" Reinhardt – guitar; Guy Babylon – keyboards; Mike Pinera – guitar, vocals; Jan Uvena – drums, percussion
1982	1982	1982–1983	1983
Lee Dorman – bass, vocals; Larry "Rhino" Reinhardt – guitar; Guy Babylon – keyboards; Mike Pinera – guitar, vocals; Ron Bushy – drums, percussion	Lee Dorman – bass, vocals; Larry "Rhino" Reinhardt – guitar; Guy Babylon – keyboards; Mike Pinera – guitar, vocals; Erik Brann – guitar, vocals (guest appearances); Doug Ingle – organ, vocals; John Shearer – drums; Luke – percussion, vocals; Supporting musicians: Ron Bushy – drums (guest – 1982)	Lee Dorman – bass, vocals; Larry "Rhino" Reinhardt – guitar; Guy Babylon – keyboards; Mike Pinera – guitar, vocals; Doug Ingle – organ, vocals; John Shearer – drums; Luke – percussion, vocals	Lee Dorman – bass, vocals; Larry "Rhino" Reinhardt – guitar; Guy Babylon – keyboards; Doug Ingle – organ, vocals; John Shearer – drums, percussion; Luke – percussion, vocals
1983	1983–1984	1984	1984–1985
Lee Dorman – bass, vocals; Larry "Rhino" Reinhardt – guitar; Guy Babylon – keyboards; Doug Ingle – organ, vocals; John Shearer – drums, percussion; Jerry Sommers – drums, percussion	Lee Dorman – bass, vocals; Larry "Rhino" Reinhardt – guitar; Doug Ingle – organ, vocals; Rick Rotante – drums, percussion	Lee Dorman – bass, vocals; Larry "Rhino" Reinhardt – guitar; Doug Ingle – organ, vocals; Lenny Campanero – drums	Lee Dorman – bass, vocals; Doug Ingle – organ, vocals; Lenny Campanero – drums, percussion; Steve Fister – guitar, backing vocals
1985	1985–1987	1987	1987
Doug Ingle – organ, vocals; Lenny Campanero – drums, percussion; Steve Fister – guitar, backing vocals; Kurtis Teel – bass	Disbanded	Ron Bushy – drums, percussion; Ace Baker – keyboards; Mike Pinera – guitar, vocals; Kelly Reubens – bass	Ron Bushy – drums, percussion; Mike Pinera – guitar, vocals; Kelly Reubens – bass; Tim Von Hoffman – keyboards
1987	1987	1987	1987–1988
Ron Bushy – drums, percussion; Mike Pinera – guitar, vocals; Kelly Reubens – bass; Tim Von Hoffman – keyboards; Glen Rappold – guitar, bass, vocals; Supporting musicians: Donny Vosburgh – drums (guest – 1987)	Erik Brann – guitar, vocals; Jim Von Buelow – guitar; Sal Rodriguez – drums	Bob Birch – bass; Ron Bushy – drums, percussion; Bill DeMartines – keyboards, vocals; Doug Jackson – guitar; Lyle T. West – vocals	Ron Bushy – drums, percussion; Erik Brann – guitar, vocals; Lee Dorman – bass, vocals; Doug Ingle – organ, vocals
1988	1988–1989	1990	1990–1992
Erik Brann – guitar, vocals; Lee Dorman – bass, vocals; Larry "Rhino" Reinhardt – guitar; Sal Rodriguez – drums, percussion	Erik Brann – guitar, vocals; Lee Dorman – bass, vocals; Larry "Rhino" Reinhardt – guitar; Steve "Mick" Feldman – vocals; Derek Hilland – keyboards, backing vocals; Kenny Suarez – drums, percussion; Supporting musicians: Doug Freedman – drums, percussion (substitute – 1989); JoAnne Kurman-Montana – backing vocals (live – 1989); Cecelia Noel – backing vocals (live – 1989)	Lee Dorman – bass, vocals; Larry "Rhino" Reinhardt – guitar; Steve "Mick" Feldman – vocals; Derek Hilland – keyboards, backing vocals; Kenny Suarez – drums, percussion	Lee Dorman – bass, vocals; Larry "Rhino" Reinhardt – guitar; Derek Hilland – keyboards, backing vocals; Kenny Suarez – drums, percussion; Robert Tepper – vocals
1993	1993	1993	1993–1994
Lee Dorman – bass, vocals; Larry "Rhino" Reinhardt – guitar; Ron Bushy – drums, percussion; Burt Diaz – keyboards	Lee Dorman – bass, vocals; Ron Bushy – drums, percussion; Derek Hilland – keyboards, backing vocals; Mike Pinera – guitar, vocals	Lee Dorman – bass, vocals; Ron Bushy – drums, percussion; Derek Hilland – keyboards, backing vocals; Denny Artache – guitar, vocals	Lee Dorman – bass, vocals; Ron Bushy – drums, percussion; Derek Hilland – keyboards, backing vocals; Mike Pinera – guitar, vocals
1994	1994–1995	1995–1997	1997–1999
Lee Dorman – bass, vocals; Ron Bushy – drums, percussion; Derek Hilland – keyboards, backing vocals; Doug Bossey – guitar	Lee Dorman – bass, vocals; Ron Bushy – drums, percussion; Derek Hilland – keyboards, backing vocals; Doug Bossey – guitar; Doug Ingle – organ, vocals	Lee Dorman – bass, vocals; Ron Bushy – drums, percussion; Derek Hilland – keyboards, backing vocals; Doug Ingle – organ, vocals; Eric Barnett – guitar, vocals	Lee Dorman – bass, vocals; Ron Bushy – drums, percussion; Doug Ingle – organ, vocals; Eric Barnett – guitar, vocals
1999	1999–2002	2002–2005	2005–2012
Lee Dorman – bass, vocals; Ron Bushy – drums, percussion; Eric Barnett – guitar, vocals; Damian Bujanda – keyboards, vocals	Lee Dorman – bass, vocals; Ron Bushy – drums, percussion; Eric Barnett – guitar, vocals; Larry Rust – keyboards, vocals; Supporting musicians: Oly Larios – bass (substitute – 2001)	Lee Dorman – bass, vocals; Ron Bushy – drums, percussion; Larry Rust – keyboards, vocals; Charlie Marinkovich – guitar, vocals; Supporting musicians: Derek Hilland – keyboards, backing vocals (substitute – 2003)	Lee Dorman – bass, vocals; Ron Bushy – drums, percussion; Charlie Marinkovich – guitar, vocals; Martin Gerschwitz – keyboards, vocals; Supporting musicians: Ken Chalupnik – bass (substitute – 2006); Dave Meros – bass (substitute – 2006); Ray Weston – drums, percussion (substitute – 2010); Phil Parlapiano – keyboards (substitute – 2012); Larry Rust – Keyboards, Vocals (substitute Italy, Croatia, Austria – 2006)
2012–2015	2015–2018	2018–2019	2020–2021
Disbanded	Ron Bushy – drums, percussion; Eric Barnett – guitar, vocals; Michael Green – percussion, vocals; Dave Meros – bass, vocals; Ray Weston – drums, percussion; Phil Parlapiano – keyboards, vocals	Eric Barnett – guitar, vocals; Michael Green – percussion, vocals; Dave Meros – bass, vocals; Ray Weston – drums, percussion; Martin Gerschwitz – keyboards, vocals; Supporting musicians: Ron Bushy – drums, percussion (guest)	Eric Barnett – guitar, vocals; Bernie Pershey – drums, vocals; Dave Meros – bass, vocals; Martin Gerschwitz – keyboards, vocals; Supporting musicians: Ron Bushy – drums, percussion (guest); Ray Weston – drums, percussion; Michael Franklin – keyboards

== Discography ==
=== Studio albums ===
Year	Album	US	CAN	Certification
1968	Heavy	78	—	
1968	In-A-Gadda-Da-Vida	4	8	RIAA: 4× Platinum; BVMI: Platinum; ARIA: Platinum; FRA: Gold; CRIA: Gold; BPI: Silver
1969	Ball	3	4	RIAA: Gold
1970	Metamorphosis	16	31	
1975	Scorching Beauty	138	—	
1975	Sun and Steel	—	89	

=== Live albums ===
Year	Album	US
1970	Live	20
2011	Fillmore East 1968	—
2014	Live at the Galaxy 1967	—
2014	Live in Copenhagen 1971	—
2014	Live in Sweden 1971	—

=== Compilation albums ===
- Evolution: The Best of Iron Butterfly (1971)
- Star Collection (1973)
- Rare Flight (1988)
- Light & Heavy: The Best of Iron Butterfly (1993)

=== Box sets ===
- Unconscious Power: An Anthology 1967–1971 (2020)

=== EPs ===
- "Iron Butterfly Theme" b/w "Look for the Sun", "Possession"
- Radio EP: "Iron Butterfly Theme", "Possession" b/w "Get Out of My Life Woman", "Unconscious Power"
- "In-A-Gadda-Da-Vida", "Flowers and Beads" b/w "My Mirage"

=== Singles ===
Year	Name	US	CAN	Album
1967	"Don't Look Down on Me" b/w "Possession" (from Heavy)	—	—	Non-album track
1968	"Unconscious Power" b/w "Possession"	—	—	Heavy
1968	"In-A-Gadda-Da-Vida" b/w "Iron Butterfly Theme" (from Heavy)	30	43	In-A-Gadda-Da-Vida
1969	"Soul Experience" b/w "In the Crowds"	75	50	Ball
1969	"In the Time of Our Lives" b/w "It Must Be Love"	96	81	Ball
1969	"I Can't Help But Deceive You Little Girl" b/w "To Be Alone"	118	—	Non-album tracks
1970	"Possession" b/w "Evil Temptation"	—	—	Heavy
1970	"Easy Rider (Let the Wind Pay the Way)" b/w "Soldier in Our Town"	66	48	Metamorphosis
1971	"Silly Sally" b/w "Stone Believer" (from Metamorphosis)	—	—	Non-album track
1975	"Pearly Gates" b/w "Searchin' Circles"	—	—	Scorching Beauty
1975	"High on a Mountain Top" b/w "Before You Go"	—	—	Scorching Beauty
1975	"Beyond the Milky Way" b/w "Get It Out"	108	—	Sun and Steel
1975	"I'm Right, I'm Wrong" b/w "Scion"	—	—	Sun and Steel

== Videography ==
- In-A-Gadda-Da-Vida (Rhino Home Video, R3-2215) 1995

(Contained video performances of "Easy Rider" (3:21), "In-A-Gadda-Da-Vida" (17:03) and "Butterfly Bleu" (19:51))

- Rock 'N' Roll Greats In Concert! (Passport Video) 2004

(Contained video performances of the full concert at Itchycoo Park in 1999)

== General and cited references ==
- Buckley, Peter (2003). The Rough Guide to Rock. London: Rough Guides. ISBN 1-84353-105-4.
