= Larry Reinhardt =

Musical artist (1948-2012)

Larry "Rhino" Reinhardt

Background information
- Born: July 7, 1948; Florida
- Died: January 2, 2012 (aged 63)
- Genres: Rock
- Occupation: Musician
- Instrument: Guitar
- Years active: 1960s-2011

Larry "Rhino" Reinhardt (July 7, 1948 – January 2, 2012) was an American rock guitarist who played with Iron Butterfly and Captain Beyond. At one time Reinhardt was known by the nicknames "El Rhino" and "Ryno".

== Early history ==
Born in Florida, United States, Reinhardt started his musical career in the 1960s in the Bradenton-Sarasota, Florida area. He worked with several bands, the most well-known of which was The Thunderbeats. In 1969, Reinhardt, along with bassist Richard Price and drummer Ramone Sotolongo, formed a "power trio" called The Load. The band landed a house gig in Gainesville, at a club called Dubs. Sotolongo was replaced by Monty Young. The Load performed mostly original, psychedelic blues-rock. They were invited to move to Jacksonville to share a house with a group from Bradenton called The Second Coming (formerly the Blues Messengers). Reinhardt had previously been a member of this group, which also included guitarist Dickey Betts, singer/keyboardist Dale Betts (Dickey Betts' wife), bassist Berry Oakley, drummer John Meeks, and keyboardist Reese Wynans. After Betts and Oakley left to join what would become the Allman Brothers Band, Reinhardt, Wynans and Meeks briefly carried on and, in 1969, Reinhardt was guitarist for The Second Coming. Upon relocating to Macon, Georgia, Reinhardt heard that Iron Butterfly needed a replacement guitarist, whereupon he flew to Los Angeles for an audition.

== Iron Butterfly ==
Both Reinhardt and Blues Image guitarist/singer, Mike Pinera, from the Tampa area, replaced Iron Butterfly guitarist Erik Brann. In 1970, Iron Butterfly released an album that included Reinhardt and Pinera, titled Metamorphosis, which was officially credited to "Iron Butterfly With Pinera & Rhino".

== Captain Beyond ==
Reinhardt and Iron Butterfly bassist Lee Dorman formed Captain Beyond in 1971, recruiting former Johnny Winter/Rick Derringer drummer Bobby Caldwell, along with ex-Deep Purple vocalist Rod Evans. Captain Beyond released its debut album, Captain Beyond, on Capricorn Records a year later. The band recorded a live album in 1973, Far Beyond A Distant Sun - Live Arlington, Texas, which was not released until 2002. That same year, Marty Rodriguez replaced Caldwell on drums, and keyboardist Reese Wynans, former member of the Blues Messengers and the Second Coming, joined. This new line-up recorded and released Sufficiently Breathless. However, the band soon split up.

== Later career ==
Reinhardt guested on two songs by Bobby Womack, "Don't Let Me Down" and "I Don't Want To Get Hurt By Your Love Again" on Womack's 1974 album, Lookin' for a Love Again.

In 1976 Dorman, Reinhardt, and Caldwell reformed Captain Beyond with new vocalist Jason Cahune, who was soon replaced by Willy Daffern (Willy Dee). Captain Beyond recorded its third studio album, Dawn Explosion, in 1977. But the group soon broke up.

Reinhardt then formed The Ryno Band, which lasted until 1981. He later joined Mad Dancer with singer/guitarist Gary Graber, Joe Starkovich on drums, Ron "The Liar" Larsen on bass, and Perry Stronge on lead vocals. Mad Dancer released one album Lost Worlds, on which Reinhardt only performed on three songs: "Still A Boy," "Serious," and "Such A Feeling."

Reinhardt performed in various reunions of Iron Butterfly (1978, 1980, 1984, 1988, and in 1989). In 1991, he played on the Robert Tepper album No Rest For The Wounded Heart, which was not released until 1996.

Reinhardt retired from the music industry for a time. In 1998, he and Caldwell reformed Captain Beyond with Jimi Interval on lead vocals, Dan Frye on keyboards, and Jeff Artabasy on bass. This new lineup recorded a four-song EP that included "Don't Cry Over Me," "Gotta Move," "Be As You Were," and "Night Train Calling (Crystal Clear)," in 2000. Captain Beyond split up again in 2002.

He released his solo album, Rhino's Last Dance, in February 2009.

On January 2, 2012, Reinhardt died aged 63 of cirrhosis of the liver, not BPS as earlier reported.

== Bands ==
=== Bittersweet ===
1968 - Was the house band at a club in Sarasota, Florida called Club Torro. The members were Ramone Sotolongo(Drummer) and son of the club owners. Reese Wynans (Keyboards) who later was in The Second Coming, Boz Scaggs, Jerry Jeff Walker, Delbert McClinton, Stevie Ray Vaughan and many, many more. Larry Rhino Reinhardt (Guitar). Richard Hombre Price (Bass) later with The Load and The Second Coming,(In the Jacksonville Jams with Duane Allman, and all the rest of the guys). Vassar Clements, The Dave Perkins Band, James Talley, Lucinda Williams, Sue Foley, The North Mississippi Allstars, Kasey Chambers, Blue Swamp and many other Fla. bands. Ron Walshaw was the first bassist with Bittersweet until Richard Price was hired. The band was disbanded to form The Load, a 3-piece psychedelic rock band.

- No Albums

=== The Load ===
1969 - was a 3-piece power rock and psychedelic rock band. It started as a club band covering the music of the late 1960s. They were hired to be the house band at Dub's in Gainesville, Fl. Later Ramone Sotolongo(Drummer) left the band and Monty Young from Sarasota, Fl. was hired and the band became a loud, marshall stacks trio doing original music. They were recorded in some live venues and a rehearsal that is apparently lost. They later moved to Jacksonville Florida to live with and jam in the jams that created what is now called Southern Rock. When Dickey Betts and Berry Oakley left The Second Coming to form The Allman Brothers Band, The Load Teamed up with Reese Wynans, John Meeks of The Second Coming to form another version of that band with the same name.

- No Albums

=== The Second Coming ===
1968-1969

- One unreleased album. Richard Hombre Price has the masters. He was the bassist in the version of The Second Coming after Dickey Betts and Berry Oakley left. Also there was (one single on Steady Records) by the first version of the band.

The Second Coming (1st version members were, Dickey Betts, Berry Oakley, Dale Betts, John Meeks, Reese Wynans & Larry "Rhino" Reinhardt)

The Second Coming (2nd version members were, Larry Reinhardt, Richard Price, Reese Wynans, Monty Young, & John Meeks.

=== Iron Butterfly ===
1970-1971

- Metamorphosis, 1970
- "Silly Sally", single, 1971
- Evolution: The Best of Iron Butterfly, greatest-hits compilation, 1971
- Light & Heavy: The Best of Iron Butterfly, greatest-hits compilation, 1993

=== Captain Beyond ===
1971-1974,1976–1978,1998–2002

- Captain Beyond, 1972
- Far Beyond a Distant Sun – Live Arlington, Texas, 1973
- Sufficiently Breathless, 1973
- Dawn Explosion, 1977

=== Bobby Womack ===
1974

- Lookin' for a Love Again, 1974
  - Two songs: "Don't Let Me Down" / "I Don't Want To Get Hurt By Your Love Again"

=== The Ryno Band ===
1977-1981

- No albums.

=== Mad Dancer ===
1981

- Lost World
  - Reinhardt wrote three songs: "Still A Boy," "Serious," and "Such a Feeling."

=== Robert Tepper ===
1991

- No Rest For The Wounded Heart, 1996

=== Solo ===
- Rhino's Last Dance, 2009
- Rhino and the Posse, Back in the Day, 2011
- Blue Swamp, recorded in the mid-2000s to be released in 2014 by Richard Hombre Price(producer)
