= Scorching Beauty =

Album by Iron Butterfly

Studio album by Iron Butterfly
- Released: January 1975
- Recorded: 1974
- Genre: Hard rock
- Length: 36:18
- Label: MCA
- Producer: Denny Randell

Iron Butterfly chronology
Evolution: The Best of Iron Butterfly (1971)	Scorching Beauty (1975)	Sun and Steel (1975)

Scorching Beauty is the fifth studio album released by the American hard rock group Iron Butterfly. Released four years after their original breakup, it was recorded by a reformed lineup with only one member remaining from their previous album, drummer Ron Bushy. In addition to Bushy, this lineup includes Erik Brann (the guitarist from the classic lineup), Phil Kramer, and Howard Reitzes. The album cover was designed by Ernie Cefalu and illustrated by Drew Struzan. This album, along with Sun and Steel (released later in 1975), failed commercially. Tracks from this album tend to be ignored on Iron Butterfly compilations/greatest hit collections.

== Reception ==
Professional ratings
Review scores
Source	Rating
AllMusic	2/5 stars

AllMusic's Stephen Thomas Erlewine called the album "undistinguished" and said that it "fell between the group's heavy acid rock and mid-'70s arena rock conventions."

== Track listing ==
Side one
No.	Title	Writer(s)	Lead vocals	Length
1.	"1975 Overture"	Erik Brann, Ron Bushy, Philip Taylor Kramer, Howard Reitzes	Brann	4:19
2.	"Hard Miseree"	Brann	Brann	3:42
3.	"High on a Mountain Top"	Kramer	Kramer	4:01
4.	"Am I Down"	Brann	Brann	5:22

Side two
No.	Title	Writer(s)	Lead vocals	Length
5.	"People of the World"	Brann	Brann	3:23
6.	"Searchin' Circles"	Brann	Brann	4:38
7.	"Pearly Gates"	Jon Anderson, Bushy	Kramer	3:25
8.	"Lonely Hearts"	Brann	Brann	3:14
9.	"Before You Go"	Brann, Reitzes	Brann, Reitzes	5:34

== Charts ==
Chart (1975)	Peak position
Australia (Kent Music Report)	97

== Personnel ==
Iron Butterfly

- Erik Brann – guitars, lead and backing vocals
- Ron Bushy – drums, backing vocals
- Philip Taylor Kramer – bass guitar, vocals
- Howard Reitzes – keyboards, vocals

Guest musician

- Jon Anderson – backing vocals on "Pearly Gates"

== Singles ==
- "Searchin' Circles" (2:53 edit) b/w "Pearly Gates" (2:35 edit)
- "High on a Mountain Top" b/w "Before You Go"
