= Sun and Steel (album) =

Album by Iron Butterfly

Studio album by Iron Butterfly
- Released: October 1975
- Recorded: 1974–1975
- Genre: Hard rock
- Length: 35:05
- Label: MCA
- Producer: John Ryan

Iron Butterfly chronology
Scorching Beauty (1975)	Sun and Steel (1975)	Light & Heavy: The Best of Iron Butterfly (1993)

Sun and Steel is the sixth and final studio album released by Iron Butterfly in 1975. It explores a wider variety of styles than any other Iron Butterfly album, yet always remains within the contemporary conventions of hard rock. Tracks from this album are usually left out of Iron Butterfly compilations/greatest hit collections. It is also the band's only album to fail to chart on the Billboard 200. In Canada it made an appearance at number 89, December 27, 1975.

== Reception ==
Professional ratings
Review scores
Source	Rating
AllMusic	1/5 stars
Only Solitaire	11/15 stars

Allmusic's Stephen Thomas Erlewine delivered a negative review of Sun and Steel, rating it one out of five stars. He said it "was an outright disastrous attempt at reshaping the band's signature sound to '70s hard rock conventions, lacking even the curiosity value of Scorching Beauty."

George Starostin's Only Solitaire page gave a positive review of the album, rating it eleven out of fifteen. He said that "This is the best Iron Butterfly album I've heard so far" and that "as I'm not a fan of the 'heavy soul' genre, I have to admit the band worked some mini-wonders on here", singling out "Scorching Beauty" as the best track.

== Track listing ==
Side one
No.	Title	Writer(s)	Lead Vocals	Length
1.	"Sun and Steel"	Brann	Brann	4:01
2.	"Lightnin'"	Bill DeMartines, Philip Taylor Kramer	Kramer	3:02
3.	"Beyond the Milky Way"	Ron Bushy, DeMartines	DeMartines	3:38
4.	"Free"	Brann	Brann	2:41
5.	"Scion"	Brann	Brann	5:02

Side two
No.	Title	Writer(s)	Lead Vocals	Length
6.	"Get It Out"	Brann	Brann	2:53
7.	"I'm Right, I'm Wrong"	DeMartines, Kramer	Kramer	5:27
8.	"Watch the World Going By"	Brann	Brann	2:59
9.	"Scorching Beauty"	Brann	Brann	6:42

== Personnel ==
Iron Butterfly

- Erik Brann – guitars, lead and backing vocals
- Ron Bushy – drums
- Bill DeMartines – keyboards, vocals
- Philip Taylor Kramer – bass, vocals

Additional personnel

- David Richard Campbell – orchestration on "Beyond the Milky Way" and "I'm Right, I'm Wrong"
- Jerome Jumonville – horns on "Beyond the Milky Way" and "Free"
- Alex Quigley – Marimba on "Free"
- Julia Tillman, Maxine Willard, and June Deniece Williams – backing vocals on "Free"

== Singles ==
- "Beyond the Milky Way" b/w "Get It Out"
- "I'm Right, I'm Wrong" (3:50 edit) b/w "Scion" (3:40 edit)
