= Doug Ingle =

American musician (1945–2024)

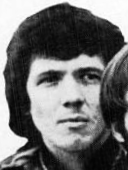
- Ingle as part of Iron Butterfly in 1969

Background information
- Born: Douglas Lloyd Ingle; September 9, 1945; Omaha, Nebraska, U.S.
- Origin: San Diego, California, U.S.
- Died: May 24, 2024 (aged 78)
- Genres: Psychedelic rock; acid rock; hard rock; instrumental
- Occupations: Musician; singer
- Instruments: Vocals; organ
- Years active: 1966–1971, 1978–1999
- Labels: Atco; Atlantic Records
- Formerly of: Iron Butterfly

Douglas Lloyd Ingle (September 9, 1945 – May 24, 2024) was an American musician, best known as the founder, organist, primary composer and lead vocalist for the band Iron Butterfly. He wrote the band's hit song "In-A-Gadda-Da-Vida", which was first released in 1968, and was the last surviving member of the band’s 1967–1969 lineup.

== Early life ==
Ingle was born in Omaha, Nebraska, on September 9, 1945. His father Lloyd, a church organist, introduced him to music at an early age. The Ingles moved within three months of his birth to the Rocky Mountains and later the family moved to San Diego.

== Career ==
Ingle founded Iron Butterfly in San Diego in 1966, remaining with the group when they relocated to Los Angeles later that year, and became part of the group's classic lineup, featuring Ingle, drummer Ron Bushy, guitarist Erik Brann and bassist Lee Dorman. His work is featured on the Iron Butterfly albums Heavy (1968), In-A-Gadda-Da-Vida (1968), Ball (1969) and Metamorphosis (1970). He also authored the band's biggest hit, also called "In-A-Gadda-Da-Vida". Though it was not recorded until their second album, it was written during Iron Butterfly's early days.

According to drummer Ron Bushy, organist-vocalist Doug Ingle wrote the song one evening while drinking a gallon of Red Mountain wine. When the inebriated Ingle then played the song for Bushy, who wrote down the lyrics for him, he was slurring his words so badly that what was supposed to be "in the Garden of Eden" was interpreted by Bushy as "In-A-Gadda-Da-Vida". He co-authored their remaining three hits ("Soul Experience", "In the Time of Our Lives", and "Easy Rider") with other members of the group. The song went to number thirty on the Billboard Hot 100, and charted highest in the Netherlands, where it went to number seven.

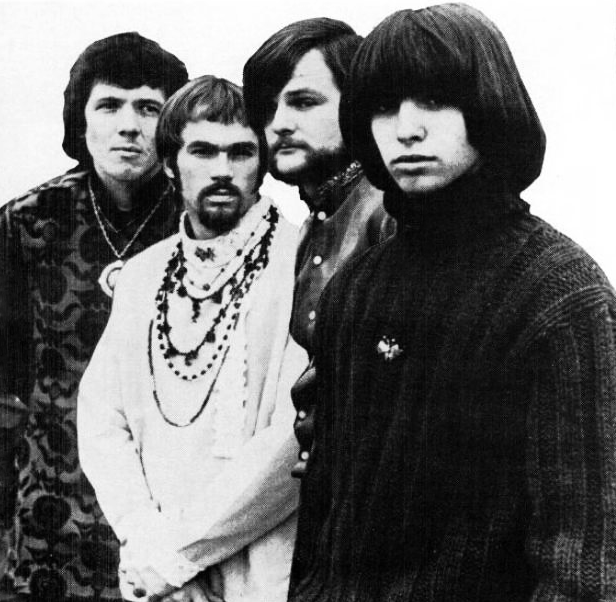
Ingle (on the left) with Iron Butterfly in 1969

Their music has found a significant impact on the international rock scenes, influencing numerous acts such as Black Sabbath, AC/DC, Rush, Alice Cooper, Mountain, Uriah Heep, Soundgarden, Stone Temple Pilots, Slayer, King Gizzard & the Lizard Wizard, and Queens of the Stone Age.

After Iron Butterfly broke up in 1971, Ingle toured occasionally with his former band members, but was not involved with either of Iron Butterfly's later two albums, Scorching Beauty and Sun and Steel, both from 1975.

Ingle had a short stint with the pop group Stark Naked and the Car Thieves in the early 1970s after he left Iron Butterfly.

== Personal life and death ==
Between 1974 and 1978, Ingle managed a recreational vehicle park in the Los Angeles National Forest. He spent time painting houses in Oregon, Washington and California.

Ingle died on May 24, 2024, at the age of 78. He was remembered by the San Diego Union Tribune as, "the lead singer and organist of Iron Butterfly, the San Diego-bred band that turned a purportedly misheard lyric into 'In-A-Gadda-Da-Vida,' the 17-minute magnum opus that propelled acid-rock into the outer reaches of excess in the late 1960s."

== Iron Butterfly discography ==
(See full discography at Iron Butterfly)

- Heavy (1968)
- In-A-Gadda-Da-Vida (1968)
- Ball (1969)
- Live (1970)
- Metamorphosis (1970)
