= Bobby Caldwell (drummer) =

American drummer

- Born: Robert E Caldwell; October 6, 1949 (age 77)
- Origin: Winter Park, Florida, U.S.
- Genres: Rock, blues
- Occupations: Drummer, songwriter, producer, arranger
- Years active: 1964–present
- Labels: A&M Records and others
- Website: theofficialbobbycaldwellsite.com

Bobby Caldwell (born 6 October 1949) is an American drummer, songwriter, producer and arranger who co-founded the rock bands Captain Beyond (with Rod Evans) and Armageddon (with Keith Relf) during the early 1970s. Prior to these projects he played on seminal Johnny Winter albums such as Live Johnny Winter And and Saints and Sinners. Caldwell was also the drummer on Rick Derringer's All American Boy, which produced the classic-rock radio staple "Rock and Roll, Hoochie Koo"; a song originally written by Derringer and recorded by the band, Johnny Winter And, with Derringer's brother, Randy Z on drums. He also played with John Lennon, Ringo Starr, The Allman Brothers Band, and Eric Clapton. Caldwell and Derringer recorded "Rock and Roll, Hoochie Koo" at Caribou Ranch in Colorado.

In the 1960s, he was a member of the New Englanders and Noah's Ark.

He is still active and living in Florida. In 1998, a reformed, new lineup of Captain Beyond created some new demo songs. The CD included original guitarist Larry "Rhino" Reinhardt. Caldwell has one daughter, Ashley Caldwell Kincheloe.
