= Darryl DeLoach =

- Born: September 12, 1947
- Died: October 3, 2002 (aged 55) San Diego, California, US
- Instruments: Vocals; tambourine
- Years active: 1966–2002
- Formerly of: Iron Butterfly

Darryl DeLoach (September 12, 1947 — October 3, 2002) was an American singer. He was the original lead singer for Iron Butterfly.

== Biography ==
DeLoach joined Iron Butterfly in 1966, and his parents gave permission to use their garage as the bands rehearsal room. DeLoach left a year later after recording their first album Heavy, which featured him on co-lead vocals on every track and as songwriter for 8/10 of the songs (including the entire B-side). After leaving the band, he left music and worked as a restauranter in San Diego. He returned to singing in the 1980s and sang in clubs around California.

DeLoach died of liver cancer on October 3, 2002 in San Diego. He was 55.
