= Danny Weis =

American guitarist (born 1948)

- Born: September 28, 1948 (age 77); Huntington Park, California, U.S.
- Occupations: Musician, songwriter
- Instruments: Guitar, bass, piano
- Formerly of: Iron Butterfly; Rhinoceros; The Rascals; Blackstone

Danny Weis (pronounced /wiːs/; born September 28, 1948) is an American guitarist, best known as a founding member of both Iron Butterfly and Rhinoceros, as well as co-writer of Rhinoceros's only charting single, "Apricot Brandy". Though he left Iron Butterfly after only one album due to internal tensions, his work was an influence in the band for most of their history, since his replacement Erik Brann made a conscious effort to imitate his playing. Weis later recounted "Erik Braunn replaced me in Iron Butterfly, and if I remember correctly, he bought a lot of my equipment, some of my clothes, they tried to clone me basically..."

Weis appeared on Iron Butterfly's first two singles, "Don't Look Down On Me" and "Possession", and their debut LP Heavy. In addition, the later album Live included a performance of "You Can't Win", a song from Heavy for which Weis wrote the music.

After leaving Iron Butterfly, Weis became a founding member of Rhinoceros and played on all three of their albums. "Apricot Brandy", an instrumental he co-wrote with Rhinoceros keyboardist Michael Fonfara, reached No. 46 on the Billboard Hot 100 and has been used as background music on a number of television shows.

After Rhinoceros disbanded in 1970, Weis briefly served as a member of The Rascals. He then reunited with several fellow members of Rhinoceros to form the band Blackstone, which broke up after one commercially unsuccessful album.

In 1974, Weis played lead guitar on Lou Reed's Sally Can't Dance album and on the subsequent world tour.

In 1979, Weis appeared as the band leader and guitarist of "The Rose Band" in the movie The Rose with Bette Midler.

In December 2006, his debut solo album, an instrumental smooth jazz effort titled Sweet Spot, was released on Marshmellow Records.
