= Jerry Penrod =

- Also known as: The Bear
- Born: September 25, 1946 (age 79); San Diego, California, U.S.
- Genres: Rock
- Occupation: Musician
- Instrument: Bass guitar
- Years active: 1966–1969
- Formerly of: Iron Butterfly, Rhinoceros

Jerry "The Bear" Penrod (born September 25, 1946) is an American bass player. He was a member of Iron Butterfly and Rhinoceros. He was nicknamed "The Bear" due to long hair and beard. He played on Iron Butterfly's first album, Heavy, which released after he left the band to form Rhinoceros, who he played on two albums with before leaving the band in 1969. After battling drug addiction he quit music and worked as a bus driver in San Diego.
