= Ron Bushy =

American drummer (1941–2021)

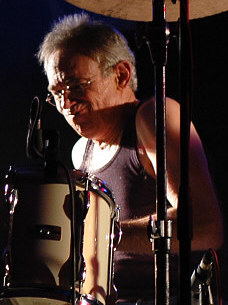
- Bushy performing in 2005

Background information
- Born: December 23, 1941; Washington, D.C., U.S.
- Died: August 29, 2021 (aged 79) Santa Monica, California, U.S.
- Genres: Psychedelic rock; acid rock; hard rock; instrumental
- Occupations: Musician; graphic artist
- Instrument: Drums
- Years active: 1966–2021
- Label: Atlantic ATCO
- Formerly of: Iron Butterfly

Ron Bushy (December 23, 1941 – August 29, 2021) was an American drummer best known as a member of the rock band Iron Butterfly and as the drum soloist on the band's iconic song "In-A-Gadda-Da-Vida", released in 1968 although performed in the band's earlier appearances. Bushy was the only member of the group to appear on all six of its studio albums.

== Career ==
=== Iron Butterfly ===
Previously playing in a band called the Voxmen, Bushy joined Iron Butterfly in 1966, following the band's relocation from San Diego to Los Angeles, replacing previous drummer Bruce Morse when he left due to a family emergency. Bushy became part of the group's classic lineup, along with vocalist and keyboardist Doug Ingle, guitarist Erik Brann, and bassist Lee Dorman.

They are best known for the 1968 hit "In-A-Gadda-Da-Vida", providing a dramatic sound that led the way towards the development of hard rock and heavy metal music. The song, originally written by Ingle as "In the Garden of Eden" but as a result of singing the first draft whilst intoxicated was misheard by Bushy as "In-A-Gadda-Da-Vida", went to number thirty on the Billboard Hot 100, and charted highest in the Netherlands, where it went to number seven.

After drumming on Iron Butterfly's first album Heavy in 1968, the band experienced substantial success with their song "In-A-Gadda-Da-Vida" from its second album, which shared the name, in which he played a lengthy and critically acclaimed drum solo. The internationally popular drummer Ringo Starr was inspired by this solo. Bushy continued to play with Iron Butterfly on its third and fourth albums, 1969's Ball and 1970's Metamorphosis, until its break-up in 1971. He rejoined the group when the band reformed in 1974, playing on its fifth and sixth albums, Scorching Beauty and Sun and Steel, both released in 1975. He departed the group in 1977, and rejoined the next year.

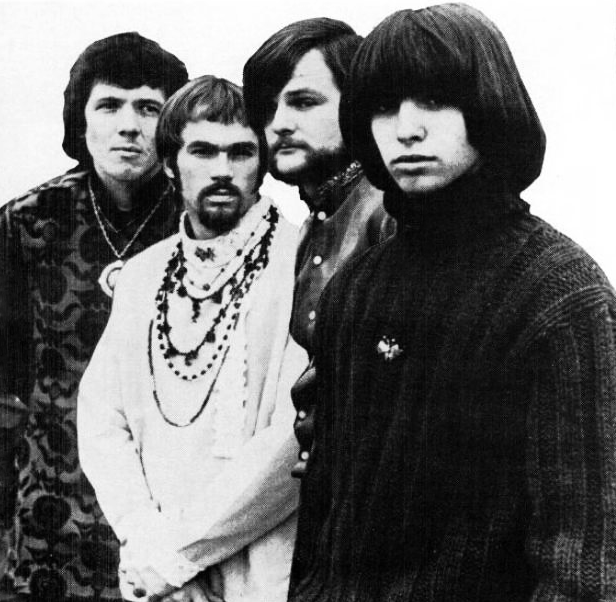
Bushy (second from left) with Iron Butterfly in 1969

Their music has found a significant impact on the international rock scenes, influencing numerous acts such as Black Sabbath, AC/DC, Rush, Alice Cooper, Mountain, Uriah Heep, Soundgarden, Stone Temple Pilots, Slayer, King Gizzard & the Lizard Wizard, and Queens of the Stone Age.

Bushy continued to drum for Iron Butterfly on-and-off until its second break-up, in 1985. From Iron Butterfly's second reunion in 1987, he continued to drum with the group on-and-off as the most consistent member throughout various other member changes and break-ups.

Bushy left Iron Butterfly permanently in 2012, but made occasional guest appearances from 2015 until his death.

=== Other bands ===
Magic (1977–1978): Bushy (drums) and Walter Kibbey (drums), Ron "Rocket" Ritchotte (guitar, vocals), former Iron Butterfly members Philip Taylor Kramer (bass, vocals) and Bill DeMartines (keyboards, vocals).

Gold (1978–1980): Bushy (drums), Ritchotte (guitar, vocals), whose spot was later filled by Stuart Young (guitar, vocals), John Koehring (guitar, lead vocals), and Kramer (bass, vocals). They recorded one album in the spring of 1979 that was never released.

== Death ==
On August 29, 2021, Iron Butterfly issued a statement that Bushy had died that morning at the UCLA Medical Center in Santa Monica of esophageal cancer, at the age of 79.

He was the third member of the In-A-Gadda-Da-Vida lineup to have died, being preceded by Erik Brann in 2003, Lee Dorman in 2012, and followed by Doug Ingle in 2024.

== Iron Butterfly discography ==
(See full discography at Iron Butterfly)

- In-A-Gadda-Da-Vida (1968)
- Ball (1969)
- Live (1970)
- Scorching Beauty (1975)
- Sun and Steel (1976)
