= In-A-Gadda-Da-Vida =

1968 single by Iron Butterfly

- Cover of the 1968 German single

Single by Iron Butterfly

from the album In-A-Gadda-Da-Vida
- B-side: "Iron Butterfly Theme"
- Released: July 31, 1968
- Recorded: May 27, 1968
- Studio: Ultrasonic Studios, Hempstead, New York, U.S.
- Genre: Acid rock; progressive rock; psychedelic rock; hard rock; occult rock
- Length: 17:05 (album version); 2:52 (single version)
- Label: Atco; Atlantic
- Songwriter: Doug Ingle
- Producer: Jim Hilton

Iron Butterfly singles chronology
| "Unconscious Power" (1968) | "In-A-Gadda-Da-Vida" (1968) | "Soul Experience" (1969) |

"In-A-Gadda-Da-Vida" (derived from "In the Garden of Eden") is a song recorded by Iron Butterfly, written by band member Doug Ingle and released on their 1968 album of the same name.

At slightly over 17 minutes, it occupies the entire second side of the album. The middle of the song features a two-and-a-half-minute Ron Bushy drum solo.

A 2-minute-52-second 45-rpm version of "In-A-Gadda-Da-Vida" was Iron Butterfly's only song to reach the top 40, reaching number 30, while the album itself reached number four on the album chart and has sold over 30 million copies. (Note: Attributed to multiple references:) An 8-minute-20-second edit of the song was included in the soundtrack to the 1986 film Manhunter. In 2009, it was named the 24th-greatest hard rock song of all time by VH1. It is also often regarded as an influence on heavy metal music and one of the first recordings of the genre.

== Background ==
Though it was not recorded until their second album, "In-A-Gadda-Da-Vida" was written during Iron Butterfly's early days. According to drummer Ron Bushy, organist-vocalist Doug Ingle wrote the song one evening while drinking an entire gallon of Red Mountain wine. When the inebriated Ingle then played the song for Bushy, who wrote down the lyrics for him, he was slurring his words so badly that what was supposed to be "in the Garden of Eden" was interpreted by Bushy as "In-A-Gadda-Da-Vida".

Even though nearly all of Iron Butterfly's songs were quite structured, the idea of turning the minute-and-a-half-long ballad into an extended jam emerged very early on. Jeff Beck claims that when he saw Iron Butterfly perform at the Galaxy Club on Sunset Boulevard in Los Angeles in April 1967, half a year before the band recorded their first album, their entire second set consisted of a 35-minute-long version of "In-A-Gadda-Da-Vida". The track was recorded at Ultrasonic Studios in Hempstead, Long Island, New York.

=== Musical references ===
The song contains a musical quotation of the Christmas hymn "God Rest Ye Merry Gentlemen", included by Ingle because he "wanted to touch the spiritual". The song's structure and drum solo refer to the Congolese Christian Missa Luba, which Erik Brann introduced to the group.

== Reception ==
Cash Box said that it was an "eerie blues work with a pounding rhythm backing and hypnotic chord structures".

== Track listing ==
1968 single

1. A. "In-A-Gadda-Da-Vida" – 2:52
2. B. "Iron Butterfly Theme" – 3:24

1971 single

1. A. "In-A-Gadda-Da-Vida (Part 1)" – 4:14
2. B. "In-A-Gadda-Da-Vida (Part 2)" – 3:53

1979 reissue

1. A. "In-A-Gadda-Da-Vida" – 3:10
2. B. "Easy Rider" – 3:06

== Charts ==
| Chart (1968–1972) | Peak position |
|---|---|
| Australia (Kent Music Report) | 92 |
| Belgium (Ultratop 50 Wallonia) | 49 |
| Canada Top Singles (RPM) | 43 |
| Netherlands (Single Top 100) | 7 |
| US Billboard Hot 100 | 30 |

== Other versions ==
The Incredible Bongo Band covered the song in 1973. The composer and percussionist David Van Tieghem released a version and two remixes in 1986. 16 BIT (a German dance project from 1986 to 1989 by Michael Münzing and Luca Anzilotti) recorded in 1987 a single "(Ina) Gadda-Da-Vida", also included in album Inaxycvgtgb. New Jersey psychedelic band 6 Feet Under recorded a version in the late 1960s. In 1987, Slayer recorded a cover version that appears on the Less than Zero soundtrack. Rapper Nas sampled the Incredible Bongo Band's cover version of the song on his singles "Thief's Theme" and "Hip Hop Is Dead".

== In popular culture ==
- Ron Bushy's drum solo was the inspiration for Ringo Starr's drum solo on "The End" from the Beatles’ 1969 album Abbey Road. It was the last song recorded collectively by all four Beatles.
- The song is prominently featured in the finale of the 1986 film Manhunter, in which serial killer Francis Dolarhyde plays the song (via an 8-track tape of its parent album) throughout the shootout.
- The song is featured in a 1995 episode of The Simpsons, "Bart Sells His Soul". Bart Simpson tricks the congregants of a Sunday mass at the First Church of Springfield into singing the song as an opening hymn titled "In the Garden of Eden" by "I. Ron Butterfly". Reverend Lovejoy describes the "hymn" as "sound[ing] like rock and/or roll" and punishes Bart for the prank by making him clean out the organ pipes, which he has "befouled with [his] popular music". Homer recalls when he and Marge "used to make out to this 'hymn'". Gertie, the elderly church organist, collapses after finishing the seventeen-minute long song.
- The song is a basis of 1970s Saturday Night Live sketches of hippies Chloe and Jason.

== See also ==
- List of 1960s one-hit wonders in the United States

== Sources ==
- MacDonald, Ian (2005). Revolution in the Head: The Beatles' Records and the Sixties (Second Revised ed.). London: Pimlico (Rand). ISBN 1-84413-828-3.
- Womack, Kenneth (2014). The Beatles Encyclopedia: Everything Fab Four. Santa Barbara, CA: ABC-CLIO. ISBN 978-0-313-39171-2.
